= List of Europeans first-class cricketers =

Cricketers who have played in first-class matches for Europeans teams based in India

This is a list in alphabetical order of cricketers who played in first-class matches for the Europeans teams which took part in various Indian tournaments from August 1892 until January 1948. The first match in 1892 was the Bombay Presidency Match between Europeans and Parsis on the Bombay Gymkhana. This tournament, always first-class, grew to include the Hindus, the Muslims, and The Rest. Besides the Bombay Gymkhana, matches were played at the Poona Gymkhana and the Deccan Gymkhana Ground, also in Poona. The last match was played in January 1946.

A second Europeans team was formed in Madras in 1908 and this also gained first-class status in 1915/16 when the annual Madras Presidency Match began. That fixture, played at the Chepauk Stadium until January 1948, was between the Europeans and the Indians. The last match was played five months after India gained Independence from the United Kingdom. The Lahore Tournament began in March 1923 and was played sporadically at the Lawrence Gardens ground in Lahore until January 1930. These matches were also first-class and involved the Europeans, the Hindus, the Muslims and the Sikhs. The Europeans played occasional matches against other teams, including Marylebone Cricket Club in 1926.

Other Europeans teams took part in the Sind, Central Provinces and Deccan Quadrangular Tournaments, but these did not have first-class status. In total, the Europeans played in 127 first-class matches.

The details are the player's usual name followed by the years in which he was active as a first-class player for Europeans teams, and then his name is given as it would appear on modern match scorecards. Note that many players represented other first-class teams besides the Europeans.

== A ==
- George Abell (1928/29–1929/30) : G. E. B. Abell
- William Adams (1936/37–1937/38) : W. J. M. Adams
- Jerry Ainsworth (1904/05) : J. L Ainsworth
- James Airy (1905/06–1908/09) : J. O. Airy
- Gilbert Alexander (1925/26) : G. W. A. Alexander
- Leigh Alexander (1922/23–1926/27) : L. A. Alexander
- Douglas Allday (1920/21–1923/24) : D. C. Allday
- E. J. Allen (Note: E. J. Allen played two first-class match for the team in 1928.) (1928/29)
- Henry Anderson (1892/93–1895/96) : H. L. Anderson
- William Anderson (1912/13) : W. H. Anderson
- Kenneth Anson (1938/39–1940/41) : K. G. Anson
- Rudolph Anstead (1921/22) : R. D. Anstead
- Robert Anstruther (1910/11) : R. A. Anstruther
- Edward Armitage (1929/30) : E. L. Armitage
- Hugo Armitage (1927/29) : H. E. Armitage
- Frederick Arnold (1935/36) : F. G. Arnold
- Arthur Arthur (1918/19–1919/20) : A. S. Arthur
- Richard Ashley (1939/40) : R. Ashley
- Gerald Aste (1921/22–1932/33) : G. Aste
- Arthur Aston (1904/05) : A. H. S. Aston

== B ==
- Edwin Bailey (1946/47) : E. R. Bailey
- Richard Bampfield (1928/29) : R. Bampfield
- Cyril Barlow (1926/27) : C. B. Barlow
- Arthur Barmby (1943/44) : A. G. Barmby
- Herbert Barritt (1940/41) : H. W. Barritt
- Charles Barton (1893/94) : C. G. Barton
- Terence Battersby (1923/24) : T. E. M. Battersby
- Joseph Beardsell (1947/48) : J. B. Beardsell
- Charles Beart (1921/22) : C. W. Beart
- Henry Beaumont (1905/06) : H. Beaumont
- Adrian Becher (1924/25–1925/26) : A. W. B. Becher
- Malcolm Beevers (1934/35) : M. S. Beevers
- F. C. Behrend (Note: F. C. Behrend played two first-class match for the team in 1928.) (1928/29)
- Stanley Behrend (1929/30–1941/42) : S. W. E. Behrend
- Geoffrey Betham (1917/18–1926/27) : G. L. Betham
- Guy Bignell (1923/24–1927/28) : G. N. Bignell
- Hugh Bignell (1901/02) : H. G. Bignell
- Ronald Binny (1940/41) : R. A. W. Binny
- Walter Black (1924/25) : W. G. Black
- George Blackmore (1944/45) : G. P. M. Blackmore
- Richard Blakeney (1926/27–1932/33) : S. R. S. Blakeney
- George Bland (Note: George Bland played one first-class match for the team in August 1898. He was born at Edgbaston in 1858 and died in Yorkshire in 1938; no other biographical details are known.) (1898/99) : G. B. Bland
- Leonard Blunt (1942/43) : L. Blunt
- Victor Bonavia (1925/26–1928/29) : V. J. Bonavia
- Henry Bond (1898/99–1900/01) : H. H. Bond
- Jocelyn Bonham-Carter (1927/28) : J. H. Bonham-Carter
- Bertrand Bosworth-Smith (1900/01) : B. N. Bosworth-Smith
- Francis Bowen (1895/96) : F. J. Bowen
- John Bowley (1932/33) : J. L. W. Bowley
- Bowman (Note: Bowman played two first-class match for the team in 1916.) (1916/17)
- John Boyd (1921/22) : J. H. Boyd
- Geoffrey Bozman (1925/26) : G. S. Bozman
- Ernest Bradfield (1906/07–1922/23) : E. W. C. Bradfield
- Walter Bradshaw (1936/37–1937/38) : W. H. Bradshaw
- B. A. Bragg (Note: B. A. Bragg played two first-class match for the team in 1923 and 1924.) (1922/23–1923/24)
- Peter Brayshay (1945/46) : P. B. Brayshay
- Alexander Brewer (1939/40) : A. N. Brewer
- Frederick Brewin (1930/31–1931/32) : F. J. Brewin
- Edmund Britten-Jones (1916/17–1917/18) : E. Britten-Jones
- Ernest Bromley (1936/37) : E. H. Bromley
- Francis Brooke (1910/11–1911/12) : F. R. R. Brooke
- Rainy Brown (1939/40–1945/46) : G. R. R. Brown
- Harry Browne (1895/96–1900/01) : H. E. Browne
- Reginald Bryan (1936/37) : R. C. P. Bryan
- William Buckland (1941/42) : W. P. Buckland
- Anthony Burke (1926/27) : A. O. L. Burke
- Gordon Burnham (1910/11) : G. L. Burnham
- Norman Burrell (1929/30) : N. S. J. Burrell
- Frederick Bustin (1929/30) : F. W. Bustin
- W. Buyford (Note: W. Buyford played his only first-class match for the team in 1913.) (1922/23–1923/24) (1913/14)

== C ==
- Edward Cadogan (1929/30) : E. H. Cadogan
- William Cadogan (1904/05) : W. G. S. Cadgan
- Gerald Campbell (1905/06) : G. V. Campbell
- Ion Campbell (1925/26) : I. P. F. Campbell
- Edward Campion (1903/04) : E. Campion
- Noel Carbutt (1926/27) : N. J. O. Carbutt
- Paul Carey (1944/45–1945/46) : P. A. H. Carey
- Charles Carnegy (1892/93–1902/03) : C. G. Carnegy
- Robert Carrick (1915/16–1933/34) : R. B. Carrick
- Brian Carroll (1903/04–1905/06) : B. M. Carroll
- Louis Carter (1923/24) : L. A. L. Carter
- James Cassels (1927/28) : A. J. H. Cassels
- Robert Cassels (1902/03) : R. A. Cassels
- Henry Catley (1919/20) : H. E. B. Catley
- Herbert Chaplin (1904/05–1906/07) : H. P. Chaplin
- H. E. Cheetham (1894/95–1914/15) : H. E. Cheetham
- George Chetwode (1938/39) : G. D. Chetwode
- Patrick Child (1941/42) : P. L. G. Child
- W. B. Chilton (Note: W. B. Chilton played his only first-class match for the team in 1923.) (1922/23)
- Ernest Christie (1909/10–1913/14) : E. E. Christie
- Frederick Clarke (1892/93–1893/94) : F. J. Clarke
- Ralph Clutton (1926/27–1928/29) : R. L. Cluttin
- Gordon Cockburn (1932/33–1946/47) : G. V. Cockburn
- John Cocks (1925/26–1926/27) : J. J. C. Cocks
- Toby Colbeck (1913/14) : L. G. Colbeck
- Frederick Coldwell (1938/39–1939/40) : F. F. Coldwell
- R. Coleman (Note: R. Coleman played his only first-class match for the team in 1941.) (1941/42)
- Ronald Coleridge (1926/27–1936/37) : R. H. Coleridge
- Denis Compton (1944/45–1945/46) : D. C. S. Compton
- Joseph Compton (1939/40) : J. N. Compton
- Ernest Coombs (1901/02-1918/19) : E. E. Coombs
- Gordon Cooper (1921/22) : G. S. Cooper
- Kenneth Cooper (1908/09–1922/23) : K. E. Cooper
- Percy Corrall (1944/45) : P. Corrall
- Ernest Cowdrey (1926/27) : E. A. Cowdrey
- Edward Cox (1892/93–1893/94) : E. H. Cox
- Harold Cox (1922/23) : H. R. Cox
- E. R. Coxon (Note: E. R. Coxon played one first-class match for the team in March 1924. No other biographical details are known.) (1923/24)
- Geoffrey Cradock-Watson (1937/38–1939/40) : G. G. Cradock-Watson
- George Craik (1935/36) : G. W. C. Craik
- Ralph Crake (1920/21) : R. H. Crake
- Peter Cranmer (1944/45) : P. Cranmer
- Alfred Craven (1928/29) : A. J. Craven
- Leslie Crockwell (1920/21) : L. H. W. Crockwell
- Stanley Crump (1906/07–1907/08) : S. T. Crump
- William Cullen (1922/23–1928/29) : W. J. Cullen
- Roualeyn Cumming (1921/22) : R. C. R. Cumming
- William Cummings (1921/22–1922/23) : W. H. Cummings

== D ==
- Alfred Dallas (1920/21) : A. S. Dallas
- Geoffrey Dallimore (1943/44) : G. C. Dallimore
- Davis (Note: Davis played his only first-class match for the team in 1919.) (1918/19)
- John Davy (1902/03) : J. D. W. Davy
- David Day (1940/41) : D. A. S. Day
- Hubert de Burgh (1905/06) : H. H. de Burgh
- Edward de Kretser (1942/43) : E. F. E. de Kretser
- Lionel Deas (1895/96–1906/07) : L. R. M. Deas
- Robert Denniston (1915/16–1925/26) : R. D. Denniston
- Robert Dewing (1907/08) : R. H. Dewing
- John Dickson (1943/44) : J. A. B. Dickson
- William Dobbie (1913/14) : W. G. S. Dobbie
- Archie Douglas (1898/99–1911/12) : A. P. Douglas
- Peter Dowson (1937/38–1938/39) : P. M. Dowson
- FitzAlan Drayson (1918/19) : F. G. Drayson
- William Drysdale (1900/01–1902/03) : W. Drysdale
- Howard Dunbar (1928/29–1929/30) : H. C. F. V. Dunbar
- Duncan (Note: Duncan played his only first-class match for the team in 1900.) (1900/01)

== E ==
- Frederick Eccleston (1945–46) : F. E. Eccleston
- Geoffrey Edge (1942–43) : G. B. Edge
- Arthur Edwards (1902–03) : A. C. Edwards
- Henry Ellison (Note: Ellison played one first-class match for the team in September 1896. Apart from being born in Bangalore in 1871, no other biographical details are known.) (1896–97) : H. J. Ellison
- William Enderby (1926–27) : W. Enderby

== F ==
- Robert Fairbairn (1944/45) : R. D. Fairbairn
- Bryan Fairfax (1897/98) : B. C. Fairfax
- William Faviell (1903/04–1909/10) : W. F. O. Faviell
- Arthur Fawcett ( 1917/18–1918/19) : A. H. Fawcett
- R. Fawkes (Note: R. Fawkes played his only first-class match for the team in 1919.) (1919/20)
- Hugh Fernyhough (1895/96–1898/99) : H. C. Fernyhough
- Charles Field (1902/03–1907/08) : C. W. Field
- William Findlay (1920/21) : W. H. Findlay
- Arthur Foster (1924/25–1925/26) : A. L. Foster
- Geoffrey Foster (1909/10) : G. N. Foster
- Charles Fraser (1927/28) : C. J. S. Fraser
- Edward Frederick (1907/08) : E. B. Frederick
- Ian Freeland (1937/38) : I. H. Freeland
- Harry Freeman (1910/11) : H. G. V. M. Freeman
- C. B. Fry (1921/22) : C. B. Fry
- O. L. Fullinfaw (Note: O. L. Fullinfaw played one first-class match for the team in January 1947; he later played a first-class match for the Services cricket team. No other biographical details are known.) (1946/47)
- Leonard Furber (1902/03) : L. D. Furber
- Ken Fyfe (1937/38) : K. C. Fyfe

== G ==
- B. Gaillard (Note: B. Gaillard played two first-class matches for the team in 1927. No other biographical details are known.) (1927/28)
- Jack Gannon (1917/18) : J. R. C. Gannon
- Frank Garnett (1917/18–1921/22) : F. M. Garnett
- Roger Williams (1923/24–1927/28) : R. F. Garnons-Williams
- William George (1892/93) : W. B. George
- Anthony Gifford (1941/42) : A. A. K. Gifford
- Leonard Gilbert (1934/35) : L. H. Gilbert
- John Gilhespy (1923/24) : J. W. E. Gilhespy
- E. Godfrey (1935/36–1936/37)
- Kenneth Goldie (1913/14–1920/21) : K. O. Goldie
- Ronald Gordon (1899/1900) : R. S. Gordon
- Eric Gore-Browne (1912/13) : E. A. R. Gore-Browne
- Gould (Note: B. Gaillard played one first-class match for the team in 1919. No other biographical details are known, except that he was a captain in the military; not the below player, as he was killed in the First World War.) (1918/19)
- Francis Gould (1913/14) : F. H. Gould
- Robert Gourlay (1935/36) : R. A. Gourlay
- Peter Gracey (1945/46) : P. B. K. Gracey
- Ogilvie Graham (1926/27) : O. B. Graham
- Edgar Grant (1927/28) : E. L. Grant
- Herbert Green (1903/04) : H. W. Green
- Michael Green (1922/23) : M. A. Green
- Reginald Green (1915/16–1920/21) : R. K .Green
- Paul Green-Armytage (1911/12–1913/14) : P. D. Green-Armytage
- Arthur Greenfield (1921/22–1928/29) : A. C. Greenfield
- Bernard Greer (1936/37–1939/40) : B. R. T. Greer
- Guy Gregson-Ellis (1925/26–1926/27) : G. S. L. Gregson-Ellis
- John Greig (1893/94–1920/21) : J. G. Greig
- Eric Grimley (1929/30) : E. H. D. Grimley
- Henry Groves (1926/27) : H. B. M. Groves
- John Guise (1927/28) : J. L. Guise
- John Gwynn (1908/09-1920/21) : J. T. Gwynn

== H ==
- Robert Hair (1895/96) : R. K. Hair
- Harold Hall (1940/41) : H. P. Hall
- John Hall (1897/98) : J. H. Hall
- Gordon Halland (1922/23) : G. H. R. Halland
- William Halliley (1911/12–1912/13) : W. S. Halliley
- Joe Hardstaff junior (1944/45) : J. Hardstaff
- Edwin Hardy (1915/16) : E. P. Hardy
- Herbert Harrington (1897/98) : H. E. Harrington
- David Harris (1943/44) : D. E. B. Harris
- Philip Harrison (1925/26–1928/29) : P. T. Harrison
- Godfrey Harvey (1922/23–1924/25) : G. T. B. Harvey
- Archibald Hastings (1916/17) : A. W. Hastings
- E. R. R. Hastings (1916/17)
- Edward Haughton (1912/13–1914/15) : E. J. H. Haughton
- John Heath (1918/19) : J. S. Heath
- Percy Heath (1901/02–1909/10) : P. M. Heath
- Arthur Herbert (1897/98) : A. J. Herbert
- Henry Herbert (1896/97) : H. C. Herbert
- Reginald Hewetson (1929/30) : R. H. Hewetson
- John Higgins (1922/23–1928/29) : J. B. Higgins
- Charles Hill-Wood (1935/36) : C. K. H. Hill-Wood
- Alan Hinde (1907/08) : A. Hinde
- George Hirst (1921/22) : G. H. Hirst
- Cedric Hitchen (1943/44–1947/48) : C. Hitchen
- Herbert Hoare (1906/07) : H. J. Hoare
- Anthony Hobson (1922/23) : A. W. F. Hobson
- Thomas Hollingworth (1932/33–1933/34) : T. V. Hollingworth
- Reginald Hopkins (1927/28–1937/38) : R. G. Hopkins
- Hugh Horton (1938/39–1939/40) : H. W. Horton
- William Horton (1929/30–1934/35) : W. H. F. K. Horton
- Alec Hosie (1921/22–1929/30) : A. L. Hosie
- W. S. Hosking (Note: W. S. Hosking played his only first-class match for the team in 1937.) (1936/37)
- Neil Hotchkin (1944/45) : N. S. Hotchkin
- Bernard Howlett (1925/26–1928/29) : B. Howlett
- Dick Howorth (1944/45) : R. Howarth
- Reginald Hudson (1926/27–1929/30) : R. E. H. Hudson
- Norton Hughes-Hallett (1925/26–1926/27) : N. M. Hughes-Hallett
- Charles Hurditch (1916/17) : C. P. Hurditch
- Douglas Hurlbatt (1915/16) : D. G. Hurlbatt
- Hyde (Note: Hyde played one first-class match for the team in January 1918. No other biographical details are known.) (1917/18)

== I ==
- Charles Inder (1938–39) : C. E. Inder
- Roland Ingram-Johnson (1925/26–1945–46) : R. E. S. Ingram-Johnson
- Tim Inskip (1926–27) : R. D. Inskip
- de Courcy Ireland (1897–98) : d. Ireland

== J ==
- Malcolm Jardine (1894/95–1902–03) : M. R. Jardine
- Henry John (1893/94–1903–04) : H. C. R. John
- Charles Johnson (1893–94) : C. D. Johnson
- P. Johnson (Note: P. Johnson played his only first-class match for the team in 1924.) (1924–25)
- Conrad Johnstone (1925/26–1947–48) : C. P. Johnstone
- Frank Joy (1908–09) : F. D. H. Joy
- Ronald Joy (1929–30) : R. C. G. Joy
- Peter Judge (1944/45–1945–46) : P. F. Jugde

== K ==
- Alexander Kearsey (1903/04–1905/06) : A. H. C. Kearsey
- Patrick Keen (1939/40) : P. J. Keen
- Reginald Keller (1928/29–1929/30) : R. C. Keller
- Wallscourt Kelly (1924/25-1927/28) : W. S. Kelly
- Kemp (Note: Kemp played one first-class match for the team in January 1931. No other biographical details are known.) (1930/31)
- Walter Kempster (1929/30) : W. F. H. Kempster
- Frank Kidd (1938/39) : F. C. Kidd
- John Kiddle (1905/06) : J. A. C. Kiddle
- Killick (Note: Killick played one first-class match for the team in January 1932. No other biographical details are known.) (1931/32)
- Roy Kilner (1922/23) : R. Kilner
- Charles Kindersley (1927/28) : C. H. L. Kindersley
- Horace King (1934/35) : H. D. King
- John King (1922/23) : J. P. King
- William Kington (1911/12) : W. M. Kington
- Thomas Kirkwood (1914/15–1916/17) : T. W. Kirkwood
- F. Knox (Note: F. Knox played one first-class match for the team in January 1924. No other biographical details are known.) (1923/24)

== L ==
- Algernon Langhorne (1903/04–1904/05) : A. P. Y. Langhorne
- James Langhorne (1904/05) : J. A. D. Langhorne
- Harold Larwood (1936/37) : H. Larwood
- George Laverton (1917/18–1918/19) : G. A. Laverton
- John Law (1940/41–1944/45) : J. A. G. C. Laverton
- Antony Legard (1943/44) : A. R. Legard
- Guy Le Marchand (1921/22–1933/34) : H. M. Lemarchand
- Pat Le Marchand (1929/30) : L. P. Lemarchand
- Hugh Lindley-Jones (1942/43) : H. M. Lindley-Jones
- Christopher Ling (1905/06) : C. G. Ling
- Kenelm Lister-Kaye (1920/21–1922/23) : K. A. Lister-Kaye
- Leslie Lloyd (1924/25) : L. S. Lloyd
- James Logan (Note: James Logan played one first-class match for the team in January 1918. Apart from being born in British India in 1882, no other biographical details are known.) (1917/18) : J. F. Logan
- Tom Longfield (1929/30–1936/37) : T. C. Longfield
- Lonsdale (Note: Lonsdale played his only first-class match for the team in 1936.) (1935/36)
- Harry Lowis (1892/93–1897/98) : H. E. Lowis
- Charles Luard (1894/95–1898/99) : C. C. Lunard
- Oswald Lumsden (1922/23) : O. F. Lumsden
- William Lumsden (1902/03) : W. F. Lumsden
- John Lunnon (1931/32) : J. D. K. Lunnon
- Bev Lyon (1924/25–1945/46) : B. H. Lyon

== M ==
- John Macartney-Filgate (1924/25) : J. V. O. Macartney
- John Macdonell (1923/24) : J. F. Macdonnell
- Kenneth Mackessack (1927/28) : K. Mackessack
- John Mackie (1930/31) : J. B. Mackie
- Malcolm Mackinnon (1927/28–1934/35) : M. Mackinnon
- Malcolm Maclagan (1935/36–1936/37) : M. D. Maclagan
- C. J. Maclaren (Note: C. J. Maclaren played one first-class match for the team in September 1913. No other biographical details are known.) (1913/14) : C. J. Maclaren
- Ernest Mallinson (1923/24–1938/39) : E. H. P. Mallinson
- Bruce Manson (1903/04) : B. E. A. Manson
- Fernley Marrison (1925/26) : F. Marrison
- Kenneth Marshall (1943/44) : K. W. Marshall
- Noel Mason-MacFarlane (1924/25) : F. N. Mason-MacFarlane
- Frederick Matthews (1926/27) : F. J. Matthews
- F. A. Matthews (Note: F. A. Matthews played two first-class matches for the team in March 1926. No other biographical details are known.) (1925/26)
- Herbert Maynard (1923/24) : H. A. V. Maynard
- Ralph McCall (1913/14) : R. L. McCall
- Kenelm McCloughin (1909/10) : K. R. McCloughlin
- James McDonogh (1903/04) : J. J. M. McDonogh
- Kenneth McCormack (1914/15–1916/17) : K. H. McCormack
- James McDougall (1924/25) : J. C. McDougall
- Hugh McHatton (1940/41) : H. B. McHatton
- J. G. McGlynn (Note: J. G. McGlynn played one first-class match for the team in January 1918. No other biographical details are known.) (1917/18)
- Robert McIntosh (1933/34) : R. I. F. McIntosh
- A. D. McIntyre (Note: A. D. McIntyre played one first-class match for the team in December 1944. No other biographical details are known.) (1944/45)
- John McIver (b. 1881) (1908/09–1918/19) : J. McIver
- John McIver (b. 1912) (1937/38–1938/39) : J. P. M. McIver
- Halley McKean (1917/18–1918/19) : H. McKean
- Frederick McLaren (1919/20) : F. A. McLaren
- Percy Mead (1895/96–1903/04) : P. J. Mead
- Caryl Mermagen (1935/36) : C. F. Mermagen
- Jack Meyer (1926/27–1934/35) : R. J. O. Meyer
- R. H. Meyer (Note: R. H. Meyer played one first-class match for the team in December 1944. No other biographical details are known.) (1944/45)
- Geoffrey Middlemass (1907/08) : G. D. H. Middlemass
- Harold Miles (1937/38) : H. P. Miles
- Arthur Miller (1910/11–1918/19) : A. C. Miller
- Patrick Miller (1929/30–1947/48) : P. N. Miller
- Lionel Milman (1901/02) : L. C. P. Milman
- John Milne (1907/08–1911/12) : J. S. W. Milne
- Norman Mischler (1941/42–1943/44) : N. M. Mischler
- John Monteath (1903/04) : J. Monteath
- Humphrey Moore (1919/20) : H. B. Moore
- Godfrey Morgan (1923/24–1929/30) : G. N. R. Morgan
- Archibald Morres (1925/26) : A. R. Morres
- Eric Morris (1928/29) : E. W. Morris
- Robert Moss (1937/38–1941/42) : R. F. Moss
- William Mosse (1908/09) : W. O. M. Mosse
- Charles Murray (1920/21) : C. S. Murray
- Henry Murray (1936/37–1938/39) : H. L. Murray
- Robert Mushet (1934/35-1939/40) : R. C. Mushet

== N ==
- Ren Nailer (1922/23–1944–45) : R. S. Nailer
- Guy Napier (1909–10) : G. G. Napier
- Arthur Newnham (1892/93–1898–99) : A. T. H. Newnham
- William Newsam (1915/16–1932/33) : W. O. Newsam

== O ==
- L. O'Callaghan (Note: L. O'Callaghan played one first-class match for the team in January 1941; he also stood as umpire in first-class matches in British India. No other biographical details are known.) (1940–41)
- S. Oliver (Note: S. Oliver played one first-class match for the team in January 1917. No other biographical details are known.) (1916–17)
- Gordon Orford (G. A. Orford) (1943–44)
- Montague Ormsby (1919–20) : M. H. Ormsby
- Charles Orton (1938–39) : C. T. Orton

== P ==
- Duncan Pailthorpe (1928/29) : D. W. Pailthorpe
- Charles Palmer (1945/46) : C. H. Palmer
- Philip Pank (1918/19) : P. E. D. Pank
- Thomas Parker (Note: Thomas Parker played five first-class matches for the team from November 1921 to December 1928; he took one five wicket haul. No other biographical details are known.) (1921/22–1928/29) : T. Parker
- Jack Parsons (1919/20–1921/22) : J. H. Parsons
- Percival Partridge (1908/09–1920/21) : P. W. Partridge
- Norman Patterson (1906/07) : N. Patterson
- Charles Pearson (1940/41) : C. L. Pearson
- Alexander Penfold (1924/25–1929/30) : A. G. Penfold
- Robert Phayre (1928/29) : R. A. Phayre
- Llewellyn Philbrick (1904/05–1907/08) : L. F. Philbrick
- Stanley Philips (1941/42) : S. I. Philips
- Gerald Phillips (1910/11–1926/27) : G. C. Phillips
- Robert Philpot-Brookes (1938/39) : R. F. H. Philpot-Brookes
- James Pigot (1925/26–1929/30) : J. P. M. Pigot
- H. Platt (Note: H. Platt played two first-class matches for the team in August 1912. No other biographical details are known.) (1912/13)
- Charles Plumer (1905/06–1916/17) : C. G. M. Plumer
- Basil Plummer (1945/46) : B. A. J. Plummer
- Joseph Pocock (1923/24–1924/25) : J. A. Pocock
- Philip Pocock (1896/97–1898/99) : P. F. Pocock
- Harold Pogson (1894/95) : H. Pogson
- Robert Poore (1892/93–1913/14) : R. M. Poore
- C. R. Potts (Note: C. R. Potts played one first-class match for the team in January 1937. No other biographical details are known.) (1936/37)
- Samuel Powell (1905/06–1907/08) : S. N. Powell
- Henry Power (1927/28) : H. R. Powell
- William Prichard (1927/28) : W. O. Prichard
- James Pridham (1929/30) : J. E. Pridham
- E. Priestley (Note: E. Priestley played three first-class matches for the team between September 1906 and September 1907. No other biographical details are known.) (1906/07–1907/08)
- Proctor (Note: Proctor played one first-class match for the team in September 1900. No other biographical details are known, except that he was a private in the army.) (1900/01)
- Charles Provis (1922/23) : C. G. Provis
- Frederick Puckle (1922/23–1928/29) : F. H. Puckle
- Vivian Purcell (1911/12) : V. E. Purcell
- Purser (Note: Purser played one first-class match for the team in March 1924. No other biographical details are known, except that he was a rifleman in the army.) (1923/24)

== R ==
- George Rae (1935/36–1937/38) : G. H. K. Rae
- Ernest Raikes (1892/93–1900/01) : E. B. Raikes
- Rowan Rait Kerr (1913/14–1920/21) : R. S. Rait Kerr
- Richard Ramsbotham (1917/18) : R. B. Ramsbotham
- Cyril Reed (1928/29-1947/48) : C. N. Reed
- George Reiner (1915/16) : G. V. Reiner
- Ernest Remnant (1916/17) : E. R. Remnant
- Harold Reynolds (1895/96) : H. Reynolds
- Frank Rhodes (1892/93) : F. W. Rhodes
- Wilfred Rhodes (1921/22–1922/23) : W. Rhodes
- B. A. Richardson (Note: B. A. Richardson played one first-class match for the team in December 1945. No other biographical details are known.) (1945/46)
- Frederick Richardson (1943/44–1944/45) : F. F. Richardson
- Daniel Richmond (1915/16–1927/28) : R. D. Richardson
- Edward Riley (1918/19) : E. C. Riley
- Geoffrey Rimbault (1934/35) : G. A. Rimbault
- Denys Rimmer (1939/40–1940/41) : D. J. Rimmer
- Kenneth Robathan (1920/21) : K. M. Robathan
- Clive Roberts (1936/37–1937/38) : C. L. C. Roberts
- Cecil Robertson (1922/23) : C. B. Robertson
- William Robins (1937/38–1940/41) : W. V. H. Robins
- Robinson (Note: Robinson played one first-class match for the team in January 1918; he took one five wicket haul. No other biographical details are known, except that he was a private in the army.) (1917/18)
- Maurice Robinson (1942/43–1944/45) : M. Robinson
- Francis Rogers (1924/25–1933/34) : F. G. Rogers
- Stuart Rogers (1946/47) : S. S. Rogers
- Hew Ross (1905/06–1907/08) : H. D. Ross
- Claude Rubie (1919/20–1931/32) : C. B. Rubie
- Arthur Rumboll (1901/02) : A. C. Rumboll
- Eustace Rutter (1905/06–1908/09) : E. F. Rutter

== S ==
- Ted Sale (1898/99–1903/04) : E. L. Sale
- Salmon (Note: Salmon played one first-class match for the team in January 1925. No other biographical details are known, except that he was a private in the army.) (1924/25)
- Malcolm Salter (1913/14–1925/26) : M. G. Salter
- Philip Sanderson (1905/06–1920/21) : P. M. Sanderson
- Alfred Sangster (1897/98) : A. B. Sangster
- Edmund Saulez (1894/95) : E. H. Saulez
- A. W. Saunders (Note: A. W. Saunders played one first-class match for the team in December 1944. No other biographical details are known.) (1944/45)
- John Scaife (1936/37) : J. W. Scaife
- John Scott (1914/15–1917/18) : J. G. C. Scott
- Valentine Sewell (1931/32-1932/33) : V. E. Sewell
- John Shadwell (1940/41) : J. R. Shadwell
- Ernest Shattock (1915/16–1926/27) : E. K. Shattock
- Arnold Shaw (1933/34–1935/36) : A. L. Shaw
- Frederick Shaw (1922/23) : F. R. S. Shaw
- Harry Sims (1909/10–1916/17) : H. L. Sims
- Alan Simpson (1922/23) : A. R. Simpson
- Reg Simpson (1944/45–1945/46) : R. T. Simpson
- Arthur Sims (1928/29–1929/30) : A. M. Sims
- Reginald Sinclair (1893/94–1903/04) : R. L. Sinclair
- Aubrey Sinden (1945/46) : A. M. Sinden
- Graham Skinner (1935/36–1943/44) : A. G. Skinner
- John Skinner (1926/27) : J. E. M. Skinner
- J. Skipp (Note: J. Skipp played two first-class matches for the team in March 1924 and November 1926. No other biographical details are known.) (1923/24–1926/27)
- Frank Smallwood (1893/94) : F. G. Smallwood
- Edward Smith (1903/04) : E. P. Smith
- Frederick Smith (1943/44) : F. S. W. Smith
- Sydney Smith (1893/94–1894/95) : S. C. U. Smith
- John Smyth (1922/23) : J. G. Smyth
- Sydenham Somers-Cox (1917/18) : S. J. Somers-Cox
- Archibald Southby (1935/36–1936/37) : A. R. C. Southby
- William Southey (1911/12) : W. M. Southey
- Archibald Spens (1929/30) : A. L. Spens
- Ralph Spitteler (1938/39–1940/41) : R. A. Spitteler
- Frederick Sprott (1892/93–1914/15) : F. L. Sprott
- Cecil Stack (1926/27) : C. Stack
- Hugh Stanger-Leathes (1905/06) : H. E. Stanger-Leathes
- Antony Stansfeld (1938/39–1947/48) : A. W. Stansfield
- John Steedman (1924/25) : J. F. D. Steedman
- Ernest Steel (1892/93) : E. E. Steel
- Berkeley Stephens (1895/96–1899/1900) : B. J. B. Stephens
- Frank Stephenson (1915/16) : F. H. A. Stephenson
- John Stephenson (1928/29–1930/31) : J. W. A. Stephenson
- Malcolm Stewart (1896/97) : M. M. Stewart
- Cyril Stileman (1905/06) : C. G. Stileman
- Frederic Stileman (1910/11–1921/22) : F. F. Stileman
- Edward Studd (1917/18) : E. B. T. Studd
- Thomas Sturgess (1940/41-–1943/44) : T. M. Sturgess
- Joseph Sullivan (1921/22–1924/25) : J. H. B. Sullivan
- Robert Summerhayes (1925/26-1938/39) : R. C. Summerhayes
- Stuart Sumner (1946/47) : S. J. Sumner
- Paul Sutton (1946/47) : P. R. G. Sutton
- Humphrey Sykes (1929/30) : H. H. Sykes

== T ==
- J. Taite (Note: J. Taite played one first-class match for the team in January 1948. No other biographical details are known.) (1947/48)
- Richard Taite (1938/39) : R. H. Taite
- Maurice Tandy (1900/01) : M. O. Tandy
- Frank Tarrant (1915/16–1936/37) : F. A. Tarrant
- Harry Tedder (1928/29) : H. J. Tedder
- Claude Tennant (1911/12) : C. A. M. Tennant
- John Tew (1928/29–1947/48) : J. E. Tew
- P. Thomas (Note: P. Thomas played two first-class matches for the team, with one match apiece in January 1936 and January 1938. No other biographical details are known.) (1935/36–1937/38)
- Elliot Tillard (1907/08–1922/23) : E. B. Tillard
- Cecil Timmins (1945/46) : C. M. J. B. Timmins
- Ernest Tomkins (1899/1900–1900/01) : E. L. Tomkins
- Frederick Tomlinson (1940/41–1943/44) : F. S. Tomlinson
- George Tottenham (1915/16) : G. R. F. Tottenham
- Francis Townend (1908/09) : F. W. Townend
- John Trask (1892/93–1894/95) : J. E. Trask
- Albert Travers (1912/13) : A. W. H. Travers
- Francis Travers (1920/21–1928/29) : F. G. Travers
- Tom Troman (1945/46) : V. T. W. Troman
- Hugh Troup (1893/94) : H. R. Troup
- W. H. Turnbull (Note: W. H. Turnbull played one first-class match for the team in January 1947. No other biographical details are known, although as a cricketer he was a right-handed batsman and a right-arm medium pace bowler.) (1946/47)
- Anthony Turner (1936/37) : A. J. D. Turner
- John Turner (1905/06–1908/09) : J. T. Turner
- Walter Turner (1910/11) : W. M. F. Turner
- Charles Twigg (1915/16–1916/17) : C. H. Twigg
- Edward Twiss (1913/14) : E. K. Twiss

== U ==
- Cecil U'ren (1941/42–1943/44) : C. W. E. U'Ren
- Thomas Usborne (1892/93–1899/1900) : T. M. Usborne

== V ==
- Paul van der Gucht (1935/36–1936–37) : P. I. van der Gucht
- William van Someren (1910–11) : W. W. van Someren
- George Vasey (1917/18–1918–19) : G. H. Vasey
- John Vesey-Brown (1939/40–1942–43)
- A. Vezey (Note: A. Vezey played two first-class matches for the team in November and December 1925. No other biographical details are known.) (1925–36)
- Walter Vezey (1925–26) : W. J. Vezey
- Raymond Vine (1945–46) : R. J. J. Vine
- Duncan Vines (1897/98–1908–09) : D. F. Vines

== W ==
- Sidney Wace (1926/27) : S. L. Wace
- W. S. Walcott (Note: W. S. Walcott played three first-class matches for the team between August 1902 and August 1903; he also played one first-class match for Bombay in November 1902. No other biographical details are known.) (1902/03–1903/04)
- Niel Walker (1923/24–1928/29) : N. A. M. Walker
- Thomas Wall (1922/23) : T. B. Wall
- Leslie Waller (1943/44) : L. O. Waller
- John Walters (1922/23–1940/41) : J. Walters
- Humphrey Ward (1921/22–1945/46) : H. P. Ward
- Lancelot Ward (1910/11) : L. B. Ward
- S. Ward (Note: S. Ward played one first-class match for the team in January 1934. No other biographical details are known.) (1933/34)
- Frank Warne (1934/35–1937/38) : F. B. Warne
- T. H. Watts (Note: T. H. Watts played three first-class matches for the team between September 1910 and September 1912. No other biographical details are known.) (1910/11–1912/13)
- John Weatherby (1901/02–1903/04) : J. H. Weatherby
- Harold Webster (1925/26–1926/27) : H. P. Webster
- Gerry Weigall (1917/18–1919/20) : G. J. V. Weigall
- Louis Weigall (1917/18–1919/20) : L. A. F. Weigall
- Victor Wells-Cole (1923/24) : V. H. Wells-Cole
- Albert Wensley (1938/39–1947/48) : A. F. Wensley
- Stewart West (1913/14–1929/30) : S. E. L. West
- Edward Weymouth (1924/43) : E. W. Weymouth
- Philip Whitcombe (1928/29–1930/31) : P. S. Whitcombe
- White (Note: White played one first-class match for the team in December 1920. No other biographical details are known, except that he was a private in the army.) (1920/21)
- Harry White (1930/31–1933/34) : H. A. White
- John White (1947/48) : J. H. White
- Reginald White (19147/48) : R. S. M. White
- Robert Whitehead (1945/46) : R. C. Whitehead
- Charles Wichers (1926/27–1927/28) : C. L. Wichers
- Clive Wigram (1906/07) : C. Wigram
- Kenneth Wigram (1896/97–1906/07) : K. Wigram
- Alfred Wilkins (1892/93–1898/99) : A. D. Wilkins
- Adderley Wilkinson (1920/21) : A. E. Wilkinson
- Patrick Williams (1940/41) : P. C. Williams
- Cecil Wilson (1912/13–1919/20) : C. H. E. Wilson
- Frank Wilson (1905/06) : F. O. Wilson
- Kenneth Wilson (1938/39) : K. S. H. Wilson
- Raymond Willmott (1926/27) : R. Willmott
- Anthony Wimbush (1932/33) : A. Wimbush
- Winterbottom (Note: Winterbottom played one first-class match for the team in September 1900. No other biographical details are known, except that he was a bombardier in the army.) (1900/01)
- Richard Wodehouse (1923/24–1924/25) : R. L. D. Wodehouse
- Maxmillian Wood (1897/98–1902/03) : M. D. F. Wood
- Vivian Woodiwiss (1919/20) : V. S. Woodiwiss
- Lovell Wooldridge (1926/27–1929/30) : L. W. Wooldridge
- D. R. Wright (Note: D. R. Wright played one first-class match for the team in January 1948. No other biographical details are known.) (1947/48)
- Richard Wright (1922/23) : R. G. Wright
- W. J. Wright (Note: W. J. Wright played two first-class matches for the team in December 1944 and 1945. No other biographical details are known.) (1944/45–1945/46)

== Y ==
- James Yates (1911/12–1923–24) : J. A. Yates
- Ronald Yeldham (1924/25–1927–28) : R. E. S. Yeldham
