= Robert Carrick (cricketer) =

Scottish cricketer

Personal information
- Full name: Robert Black Carrick
- Born: 9 June 1892; Troon, Ayrshire, Scotland
- Died: 4 September 1945 (aged 53); Ootacamund, Madras Presidency, British India
- Batting: Unknown
- Bowling: Unknown

Domestic team information
- Years: Team
- 1915/16–1933/34: Europeans
- 1926/27: Madras

Career statistics
Competition	First-class
Matches	18
Runs scored	711
Batting average	24.51
100s/50s	1/3
Top score	107
Balls bowled	958
Wickets	21
Bowling average	20.57
5 wickets in innings	–
10 wickets in match	–
Best bowling	4/41
Catches/stumpings	7/–
- Source: Cricinfo, 13 November 2022

Robert Black Carrick (9 June 1892 — 4 September 1945) was a Scottish first-class cricketer and an officer of the Indian Volunteers and Royal Artillery.

The son of John Carrick, was born at Troon in June 1892. He was educated at Winchester College, where he played for the college cricket team. After completing his education, he travelled to British India where he served in the Madras Artillery Volunteers during the First World War, being commissioned as a second lieutenant in June 1915. He was made a temporary lieutenant in February 1917, and a temporary captain in June 1918, at which point he was serving in the Royal Artillery. Following the war, in March 1919, he relinquished his commission upon the completion of his service, at which point he was granted the full rank of captain.

A member of the Madras Cricket Club, he played first-class cricket while in British India, making his debut for England against India at Bombay in December 1915. Later that month he made his debut for the Europeans cricket team and was a regular feature in the Europeans team for their Madras Presidency Matches against the Indians, making sixteen appearances for the team from 1915 to 1934. Described as the Jessop of the Madras cricket team, Carrick was a member of a Madras team which was described as the strongest ever and contained the likes of C. P. Johnstone, Alexander Penfold, and Humphrey Ward. He appeared once in first-class cricket for Madras against the Marylebone Cricket Club at Madras in 1927. An all-rounder, Carrick played in eighteen first-class matches, scoring 711 runs at an average of 24.51; he made century, a score of 107 against the Indians in 1926. As a bowler, he took 21 wickets at a bowling average of 20.57, with best figures of 4 for 41. Carrick later died in British India at Ootacamund in September 1945.
