= Alfred Dallas =

English cricketer and British Army officer

Personal information
- Full name: Alfred Stuart Dallas
- Born: 25 August 1895; Kasauli, Punjab, British India
- Died: 30 January 1921 (aged 25); Secunderabad, Hyderabad, British India
- Batting: Unknown
- Bowling: Unknown

Domestic team information
- Years: Team
- 1920/21: Europeans

Career statistics
Competition	First-class
Matches	1
Runs scored	97
Batting average	48.50
100s/50s	–/1
Top score	52
Balls bowled	72
Wickets	3
Bowling average	32.00
5 wickets in innings	–
10 wickets in match	–
Best bowling	3/96
Catches/stumpings	–/–
- Source: ESPNcricinfo, 21 November 2021

Alfred Stuart Dallas MC and Bar (25 August 1895 – 30 January 1921) was an English first-class cricketer and British Army officer.

The son of Charles Mowbray Dallas and his wife Catherine, he was born in British India at Kasauli in August 1895. He was educated at Charterhouse School, where he played for the cricket eleven. From Charterhouse he attended the Royal Military Academy at Woolwich, from where he graduated as a second lieutenant into the Royal Horse and Royal Field Artillery in November 1914, with the First World War having begun three and a half months previously. He was made a temporary lieutenant in July 1915, with him gaining the rank in full in December of the same year. Dallas was awarded the Military Cross in October 1916 for conspicuous gallantry while undertaking duties as a Forward Observation Officer, for which he was wounded twice. In January 1917, he was made an acting captain and in August 1917 he added a bar to his Military Cross when he was decorated for conspicuous gallantry and devotion to duty in leading horses to safety during intense shelling, before returning to an observation post at the front and doing valuable work for his battery. He relinquished the acting rank of captain following the end of the war.

Dallas was stationed in British India after the war, where he played a single first-class cricket match for the Europeans cricket team against the Indians at Madras in December 1920. In the Indians only innings of the match, Dallas took figures of 3 for 96 from 12 overs while opening the bowling with Kenneth Goldie. Batting twice in the match, he was dismissed for 52 by M. Venkataramanjulu, while following-on in their second innings he was dismissed for 45 runs by M. Baliah Naidu. He drowned at Secunderabad while duckshooting on 30 August 1921 and is buried there at the Trimulgherry Cantonment Cemetery.
