= Douglas Allday =

English cricketer and British Army officer

Personal information
- Full name: Douglas Charles Allday
- Born: 24 January 1895; Knowle, Warwickshire, England
- Died: 2 February 1945 (aged 50); Wolverhampton, Staffordshire, England
- Batting: Unknown

Domestic team information
- Years: Team
- 1920/21–1923/24: Europeans

Career statistics
Competition	First-class
Matches	2
Runs scored	13
Batting average	4.33
100s/50s	–/–
Top score	10
Catches/stumpings	1/–
- Source: ESPNcricinfo, 6 November 2021

Douglas Charles Allday (24 January 1895 – 2 February 1945) was an English first-class cricketer and British Army officer.

Born at Knowle in Warwickshire in January 1895, Allday was educated at Malvern College. The First World War began shortly after he finished his education at Malvern, with Allday being commissioned into the British Army as a temporary second lieutenant in September 1914. Serving in the war with the Royal Army Service Corps, he was promoted to the temporary rank of lieutenant in March 1915. He ended the war as a temporary captain, a rank he retained in full upon the completion of his service in August 1919. After the war he went to British India, where he played in two first-class cricket matches for the Europeans cricket team against the Indians in the Madras Presidency Matches of 1920 and 1924. He scored 13 runs across his two matches, with a highest score of 10. Allday died in England at Wolverhampton in February 1945.
