= William Prichard (cricketer) =

Welsh cricketer and soldier

Personal information
- Full name: William Oliver Prichard
- Born: 2 January 1879; Margam, Glamorgan, Wales
- Died: 3 April 1960 (aged 81); Brampton Bryan, Herefordshire, England
- Batting: Unknown
- Bowling: Unknown

Domestic team information
- Years: Team
- 1926/27: Europeans

Career statistics
Competition	First-class
Matches	1
Runs scored	11
Batting average	11.00
100s/50s	–/–
Top score	11*
Balls bowled	66
Wickets	0
Bowling average	–
5 wickets in innings	–
10 wickets in match	–
Best bowling	–
Catches/stumpings	1/–
- Source: Cricinfo, 3 December 2023

William Oliver Prichard JP (2 January 1879 – 3 April 1960) was a Welsh first-class cricketer and an officer in the British Army.

The son of R. K. Prichard, he was born in January 1879 at Margam, Glamorgan. He was educated at Sherborne School, where he played for the cricket and rugby teams. From there, he joined the Somerset Light Infantry as a second lieutenant, before transferring to the South Wales Borderers in January 1899. He served in the Second Boer War (1899–1902), during the course of which he was promoted to lieutenant in September 1901. He was mentioned in dispatches for his service in the war. He was promoted to captain in December 1907. Prichard served in the First World War and was mentioned in dispatches in the first months of the conflict. He was severely wounded in action in the opening months of the war; despite this, he remained in the army until his ill health necessitated his retirement in October 1915. In the interim, he was promoted to major in the month before his retirement.

Prichard later went to British India, where he played first-class cricket for the Europeans cricket team against the Indians at Madras in the 1926–27 Madras Presidency Match. Batting twice in the match from the tail, he ended the Europeans first innings unbeaten on 11, while in their second innings he was dismissed without scoring by M. J. Gopalan. With the ball, he bowled 11 wicketless overs. Prichard later served as the secretary of the St John Ambulance Association and was a justice of the peace for Herefordshire. During the Second World War, he was a section commander for the Special Constabulary. Prichard died in April 1960 at Brampton Bryan, Herefordshire.
