= Ralph Spitteler =

English cricketer and British Indian Army officer

Personal information
- Full name: Ralph Alexander Spitteler
- Born: 16 November 1915; Cannanore, Madras Presidency, British India
- Died: 14 March 1946 (aged 30); Djakarta, West Java, Dutch East Indies
- Batting: Left-handed
- Bowling: Right-arm fast-medium

Domestic team information
- Years: Team
- 1938/39–1940/41: Europeans
- 1938/39: Madras

Career statistics
Competition	First-class
Matches	4
Runs scored	24
Batting average	12.00
100s/50s	–/–
Top score	11*
Balls bowled	867
Wickets	19
Bowling average	21.42
5 wickets in innings	2
10 wickets in match	–
Best bowling	5/29
Catches/stumpings	5/–
- Source: Cricinfo, 15 December 2021

Ralph Alexander Spitteler (16 November 1915 – 14 March 1946) was an English first-class cricketer and British Indian Army officer.

The son of Charles and Daisy Spitteler, he was born in British India at Kannur in November 1915. He spent his youth living with his parents at the Yercaud hill station in Madras Presidency and later studied at the University of Madras. He played made his debut in first-class cricket for the Europeans cricket team against the Indians at Madras in January 1939 in the Madras Presidency Match, with him taking 9 wickets in the match, including a five wicket haul in the Indians second innings. A few weeks after this match, he played for the Madras cricket team in the Ranji Trophy against Bengal. He appeared in two further first-class matches for the Europeans against the Indians in January 1940 and 1941, with Spitteler again impressing in the 1940 fixture with another five wicket haul. With his right-arm fast-medium bowling across four first-class matches, he managed to take 19 wickets at an average of 21.42. With the Japanese declaration of war on the United States and the British Empire in December 1941, Spitteler played no further first-class matches as he undertook military duties in the British Indian Army with the 10th Gurkha Rifles. Initially serving as a non-commissioned officer, Spitteler was an emergency commission to the rank of lieutenant in February 1942. He saw action in the Burma campaign and was seriously wounded while fighting the Japanese at Scraggy Hill and Shenam Pass in 1944. He was subsequently captured by the Japanese and transported as a prisoner of war to Java in the Japanese-occupied Dutch East Indies, where he was to remain until the end of the war. He never recovered from his wounds, eventually succumbing to them six months after the end of the war in March 1946. He was the last first-class cricketer to die as a direct result of the war. Spitteler was buried at the Jakarta War Cemetery.
