= Arthur Barmby =

English cricketer and soldier (1909 – 1976)

Personal information
- Full name: Arthur Geoffrey Barmby
- Born: 24 June 1909; West Ham, Essex, England
- Died: 16 August 1976 (aged 67); Worthing, Sussex, England
- Batting: Left-handed
- Bowling: Left-arm medium

Domestic team information
- Years: Team
- 1943/44: Europeans

Career statistics
Competition	First-class
Matches	1
Runs scored	0
Batting average	0.00
100s/50s	–/–
Top score	0
Balls bowled	222
Wickets	1
Bowling average	64.00
5 wickets in innings	–
10 wickets in match	–
Best bowling	1/64
Catches/stumpings	–/–
- Source: Cricinfo, 4 January 2024

Arthur Geoffrey Barmby (24 June 1909 – 16 August 1976) was an English first-class cricketer and an officer in the British Army.

Barmby was born at West Ham in June 1909. He was educated at St Paul's School, where he played for the school cricket team. He later served in the Second World War, being commissioned as a second lieutenant into the Royal Artillery (RA) in September 1941. While serving in British India during the war, he made a single appearance in first-class cricket for the Europeans cricket team against the Indians cricket team at Madras in the 1943–44 Madras Presidency Match. Batting once in the match from the lower-order, he was dismissed without scoring by K. S. Kannan. With his left-arm medium pace bowling, he took the wicket of M. Swaminathan for the cost of 64 runs from 37 overs.

Barmby continued his service with the RA after the war in the Territorial Army (TA), for which he was decorated with the Territorial Decoration in March 1966, for twenty years' service in the TA. Having returned to England, Barmby lived in Chester with his wife and played club cricket for Chester Boughton Hall Cricket Club, in addition to playing rugby union for Chester Rugby Club. By profession, he was an official in the insurance industry. He died at Worthing in August 1976; he was survived by his second wife, with his first having died in 1969.
