= Ronald Coleridge =

English cricketer and tea planter

Personal information
- Full name: Ronald Hamilton Coleridge
- Born: 27 October 1905; Madanapalle, Bengal Presidency, British India
- Died: 1979 (aged 73/74); Wallingford, Berkshire, England

Domestic team information
- Years: Team
- 1926/27–1936/37: Europeans

Career statistics
Competition	First-class
Matches	2
Runs scored	38
Batting average	9.50
100s/50s	0/0
Top score	17
Balls bowled	54
Wickets	0
Bowling average	–
5 wickets in innings	–
10 wickets in match	–
Best bowling	–
Catches/stumpings	3/–
- Source: Cricinfo, 23 May 2023

Ronald Hamilton Coleridge (27 October 1905 – 1979) was an English first-class cricketer and tea planter in Colonial India.

The son of F. A. Coleridge, he was born in British India at Madanapalle. Coleridge was educated in England at Marlborough College, where he was involved with the cricket, rugby and field hockey teams, in addition to representing the college in racquets. Following the completion of his education, he returned to British India where he became a tea planter. In India, he made two appearances first-class cricket for the Europeans cricket team against the Indians in the Madras Presidency Matches of 1926–27 and 1936–37. He scored 38 runs in these two matches, with a highest score of 17. Coleridge served in the Second World War as a lieutenant with the Royal Indian Navy Volunteer Reserve. He later returned to England, where he died at Wallingford in 1979. He was married to Maud Coleridge, a cipher for the Special Operations Executive in the Far-East.
