= William Adams (cricketer, born 1905) =

Scottish cricketer

Personal information
- Full name: William John Mailer Adams
- Born: 22 June 1905; Edmonton, Middlesex, England
- Died: 6 November 1971 (aged 66); Watford, Hertfordshire, England
- Batting: Unknown
- Bowling: Unknown

Domestic team information
- Years: Team
- 1936/37–1937/38: Europeans
- 1936/37: Madras

Career statistics
Competition	First-class
Matches	3
Runs scored	15
Batting average	3.00
100s/50s	–/–
Top score	7
Balls bowled	557
Wickets	10
Bowling average	25.00
5 wickets in innings	1
10 wickets in match	–
Best bowling	6/35
Catches/stumpings	1/–
- Source: Cricinfo, 6 November 2021

William John Mailer Adams (22 June 1905 – 6 November 1971) was an English first-class cricketer.

Born at Edmonton in Middlesex in June 1905, Adams became a figure in Madras cricket in the 1930s. He played in three first-class cricket matches while in British India, playing twice for the Europeans against the Indians in 1937 and 1938, in addition to playing for Madras in the 1936–37 Ranji Trophy against Hyderabad. For the Europeans he took figures of 6 for 35 in the 1937 fixture, and overall he took 10 wickets in first-class cricket at an average of exactly 25. Adams died in England at Watford in November 1971.
