= Arthur Arthur =

English cricketer and British Army medical officer (1877–1930)

Personal information
- Full name: Arthur Samuel Arthur
- Born: 16 March 1877; Newcastle upon Tyne, Northumberland, England
- Died: 9 September 1930 (aged 53); Carlisle, Cumberland, England
- Batting: Unknown

Domestic team information
- Years: Team
- 1918/19–1919/20: Europeans

Career statistics
Competition	First-class
Matches	2
Runs scored	26
Batting average	13.00
100s/50s	–/–
Top score	21
Catches/stumpings	1/–
- Source: ESPNcricinfo, 15 May 2023

Arthur Samuel Arthur OBE (16 March 1877 — 9 September 1930) was an English first-class cricketer and British Army officer.

The son Samuel Arthur, he was born at Newcastle upon Tyne in March 1877. After completing his studies in medicine, Arthur was elected a fellow of the Royal College of Physicians of London in 1894. Arthur was commissioned into the Royal Army Medical Corps (RAMC) as a lieutenant in February 1904. He served in the First World War with the RAMC, holding the rank of captain at the start of the war. He was promoted to major in May 1915, before being temporarily appointed a lieutenant colonel whilst in command of field ambulances. Shortly after the conclusion of the war, Arthur served in British India, where he made two appearances in first-class cricket for the Europeans cricket team against the Indians at Madras in the 1918–19 and 1919–20 Madras Presidency Matches. He scored 26 runs in his two matches, with a highest score of 21. He was made an OBE in September 1921. He retired from active service in July 1922, at which point he was promoted to lieutenant colonel. Arthur died at Blackhall Woods near Carlisle in September 1930; it was noted by his obituary that he had previously acted as medical officer at the Border Regiment depot at Carlisle.
