= Thomas Hollingworth =

American-born English cricketer

Personal information
- Full name: Thomas Vernon Hollingworth
- Born: 27 July 1907; New York City, New York, United States
- Died: 2 October 1973 (aged 66); Topsham, Devon, England
- Batting: Right-handed
- Bowling: Unknown

Domestic team information
- Years: Team
- 1929: Hampshire
- 1932/33–1933/34: Europeans
- 1933–1946: Devon

Career statistics
Competition	First-class
Matches	4
Runs scored	58
Batting average	9.66
100s/50s	–/–
Top score	17
Balls bowled	252
Wickets	4
Bowling average	30.75
5 wickets in innings	–
10 wickets in match	–
Best bowling	4/92
Catches/stumpings	–/–
- Source: Cricinfo, 31 December 2009

Thomas Vernon Hollingworth (27 July 1907 — 2 October 1973) was an American-born English first-class cricketer.

Hollingsworth was born in the United States in New York City in July 1907, but came to England as a child, where he was educated at Bromsgrove School. He played first-class cricket for Hampshire in the 1929 County Championship, playing twice against Surrey at The Oval and Lancashire at Southampton. He later played first-class cricket in British India for the Europeans cricket team, making two appearances in the Madras Presidency Matches of January 1933 and 1934 against the Indians cricket team. In his four first-class matches, he scored 58 runs and took four wickets. Back in England, he represented his adopted home county of Devon in minor counties cricket between 1933 and 1946, making eight appearances in the Minor Counties Championship. Hollingworth died on 2 October 1973 in Topsham, Devon.
