= Norman Mischler =

Scottish cricketer

Personal information
- Full name: Norman Martin Mischler
- Born: 9 October 1920; Paddington, London, England
- Died: 10 September 2009 (aged 88); London, England
- Batting: Right-handed
- Role: Wicket-keeper

Domestic team information
- Years: Team
- 1941/42–1943/44: Europeans
- 1946–1947: Cambridge University

Career statistics
Competition	First-class
Matches	24
Runs scored	76
Batting average	15.35
100s/50s	–/2
Top score	76
Catches/stumpings	35/10
- Source: ESPNcricinfo, 4 June 2019

Norman Martin Mischler (9 October 1920 – 10 September 2009) was an English first-class cricketer and British Indian Army officer. Mischler served in the British Indian Army during the Second World War. While in British India he played first-class cricket for the Europeans cricket team, before returning to England where he played first-class cricket for Cambridge University and the Free Foresters. He was a leading figure in the chemical industry.

== Early life and military service ==
Mischler was born at Paddington in October 1920 to Martin Mischler and his wife, Martha Sarah Lambert. He was educated at St Paul's School. After leaving St Paul's he enlisted in the ranks of the British Army as a private. He was commissioned during the Second World War as a second lieutenant as of 17 August 1941 and joined the Royal Indian Army Service Corps. In December 1941, he made his debut in first-class cricket for the Europeans against the Parsees in the 1941–42 Bombay Quadrangular at Bombay. He made two further first-clas appearances for the Europeans, both against the Indians in the Madras Presidency Matches of 1942 and 1943. By the end of the war he had been mentioned in dispatches twice, once as a temporary captain in May 1946, and secondly as a temporary major in September 1946. Both were for service in Burma.

== Return to England ==
He returned to England in 1946, where he began studying at St Catharine's College, Cambridge. While studying at Cambridge he played first-class cricket for Cambridge University in the 1946 and 1947 seasons, making eighteen appearances. He scored 434 runs for Cambridge, at an average of 14.96, with a high score of 76. He made three further appearances in first-class cricket for the Free Foresters against Cambridge University in 1949, 1950 and 1951. Mischler played as a wicket-keeper during his first-class career, taking 35 catches and making 10 stumpings. After graduating from Cambridge, Mischler worked in the chemical industry, most notably for Hoechst. He was vice-chairman of the German Chamber of Industry and Commerce in London from 1974 to 1984, for which he was awarded the Order of Merit of the Federal Republic of Germany (Officer's Cross) in 1985. He died at London in September 2009.
