= Charles Provis =

English cricketer

Personal information
- Full name: Charles G. Provis
- Born: 1885; Camborne, Cornwall, England
- Died: Unknown

Domestic team information
- Years: Team
- 1906: Cornwall
- 1922/23: Europeans (India)

Career statistics
Competition	First-class
Matches	1
Runs scored	0
Batting average	0.00
100s/50s	0/0
Top score	0
Balls bowled	84
Wickets	2
Bowling average	16.00
5 wickets in innings	0
10 wickets in match	0
Best bowling	2/32
Catches/stumpings	0/–
- Source: ESPNcricinfo, 6 April 2012

Charles G. Provis (1885 – date of death unknown) was an English cricketer. Provis' batting and bowling styles are unknown. He was born at Camborne, Cornwall.

Provis made two appearances in the 1906 Minor Counties Championship for Cornwall against Dorset and Berkshire.

He later worked for the Kolar Gold Fields and made a single first-class appearance when in the British Raj for the Europeans against the Indians in 1923. The Europeans won the toss and elected to bat first, making 104 all out, during which Provis was dismissed for a duck by Rama Krishnappa. In the Indians first-innings of 161 all out, Provis took the wickets of M. Venkataramanjulu and T. Bangarababu to finish with figures of 2/32 from fourteen overs. The Europeans then made 67 all out in their second-innings, with Provis again dismissed for a duck, this time by C. R. Ganapathy. The Indians won the match by ten wickets.

He married Bertha Marks in 1923. She died in 1936 in Brazil, where he worked for a gold mining company.
