= Tom Troman =

English cricketer

Personal information
- Full name: Victor Thomas Wilfred Troman
- Born: 30 August 1914; Wednesbury, Staffordshire, England
- Died: 2 October 2000 (aged 86); Torquay, Devon, England
- Batting: Right-handed
- Bowling: Right-arm medium

International information
- National side: Nigeria

Domestic team information
- Years: Team
- 1949-1956: Devon
- 1945/46: Europeans (India)
- 1934-1938: Staffordshire

Career statistics
Competition	First-class
Matches	1
Runs scored	21
Batting average	10.50
100s/50s	–/–
Top score	20
Balls bowled	90
Wickets	1
Bowling average	55.00
5 wickets in innings	–
10 wickets in match	–
Best bowling	1/20
Catches/stumpings	–/–
- Source: Cricinfo, 2 March 2011

Victor Thomas 'Tom' Wilfred Troman (30 August 1914 – 2 October 2000) was an English cricketer. Troman was a right-handed batsman who bowled right-arm medium pace. He was born in Wednesbury, Staffordshire.

Troman made his debut for Staffordshire in the 1934 Minor Counties Championship against Denbighshire. This was to be his only appearance for the county in 1934 and his last until 1938, when he played his second and final Minor Counties fixture for Staffordshire against the Yorkshire Second XI.

In 1945, while in the British Raj, he made his only first-class appearance for the Europeans (India) against the Indians. In the Europeans first-innings he scored 20 runs before being dismissed by M.G. Venkataraman and in their second-innings he made a single run before being dismissed by A. G. Ram Singh. With the ball he claimed a single wicket, that of A. G. Ram Singh, ending with match figures of 1/55.

Following his return from the Raj, he moved to Devon where he made his debut for Devon in the 1949 Minor Counties Championship against the Surrey Second XI. From 1947 to 1956, he represented Devon in 20 Championship matches, the last of which came against the Somerset Second XI. Troman played two matches for Nigeria in 1955 and 1956 against Gold Coast.

He died in Torquay, Devon on 2 October 2000.
