= John McIver =

Scottish cricketer

Personal information
- Full name: John McIver
- Born: 27 May 1881; Glasgow, Lanarkshire, Scotland
- Died: 27 October 1950 (aged 69); Rawalpindi, Punjab, Pakistan
- Batting: Unknown
- Relatives: John McIver (son)

Domestic team information
- Years: Team
- 1918/19: Europeans

Career statistics
Competition	First-class
Matches	1
Runs scored	12
Batting average	6.00
100s/50s	–/–
Top score	12
Balls bowled	167
Wickets	4
Bowling average	17.00
5 wickets in innings	–
10 wickets in match	–
Best bowling	2/5
Catches/stumpings	1/–
- Source: ESPNcricinfo, 19 November 2022

John McIver (27 May 1881 — 27 October 1950) was a Scottish first-class cricketer.

The son of William Broadfoot McIver, he was born in Glasgow in May 1881. He was educated at Uppingham School, before matriculating to Trinity College, Cambridge. After graduating from Cambridge, he went to British India where he worked as a broker in Madras for Messrs Hudson, Tod & Co. While in India, he made a single appearance in first-class cricket for the Europeans cricket team against the Indians at Madras in the Madras Presidency Match of 1919. Batting twice in the match, he was dismissed without scoring by Cotah Ramaswami in the Europeans first innings, while in their second innings he was dismissed for 12 runs by C. K. Krishnaswamy. Across the match he took 4 wickets for the cost of 68 runs. McIver remained in India following the end of British rule there, and following the Partition of India he was resident at Rawalpindi in the newly formed state of Pakistan, where he died in October 1950. His son, also called John, was a first-class cricketer.
