= John Bowley (cricketer) =

English cricketer and soldier

Personal information
- Full name: John Lindsay William Bowley
- Born: 26 August 1910; Bickley, Kent, England
- Died: 15 February 1979 (aged 68); Lambeth, London, England
- Batting: Unknown

Domestic team information
- Years: Team
- 1932/33: Europeans

Career statistics
Competition	First-class
Matches	1
Runs scored	14
Batting average	7.00
100s/50s	–/–
Top score	13
Catches/stumpings	–/–
- Source: ESPNcricinfo, 4 November 2023

John Lindsay William Bowley (26 August 1910 — 15 February 1979) was an English first-class cricketer and British Army officer.

The son of A. W. Bowley, he was born in February 1910 at Bickley, Kent. He was educated at Marlborough College, where he played in the rugby union fifteen. From there, he matriculated to St John's College, Cambridge. After graduating from Cambridge, he went into business. Whilst in British India, he made a single appearance in first-class cricket for the Europeans cricket team against the Indians at Madras in the 1932–33 Madras Presidency. Batting twice in the match, he was run out for 13 runs in the Europeans first innings, whilst in their second innings he was dismissed for a single run by Shahabuddin. Bowley later served in the Second World War with the Royal Artillery, being commissioned as a second lieutenant in August 1940. He was captured by the Germans in 1942, and spent the remainder of the war as a prisoner of war. Bowley died Lambeth in February 1979.
