= John Macartney-Filgate =

Irish cricketer and British Army officer

Personal information
- Full name: John Victor Opynschae Macartney-Filgate
- Born: 20 May 1897; Dublin, Ireland
- Died: 23 July 1964 (aged 67); London, England
- Batting: Unknown
- Bowling: Unknown

Domestic team information
- Years: Team
- 1924/25: Europeans

Career statistics
Competition	First-class
Matches	1
Runs scored	11
Batting average	5.50
100s/50s	–/–
Top score	10
Balls bowled	24
Wickets	0
Bowling average	–
5 wickets in innings	–
10 wickets in match	–
Best bowling	–
Catches/stumpings	–/–
- Source: ESPNcricinfo, 6 June 2022

John Victor Opynschae Macartney-Filgate CBE MC (20 May 1897 — 23 July 1964) was an Irish first-class cricketer and British Indian Army officer.

The son of Edward Macartney-Filgate and Bertha Eugenie Lomax, he was born at Dublin in May 1897. He was educated in England at Rugby School, from where he joined the British Army to serve in the First World War. He was commissioned into the Royal Artillery as a second lieutenant on probation in July 1915, and was confirmed in that rank in May 1916. He was made an acting captain in May 1917, with promotion to lieutenant in July of the same year. Throughout the course of the war, Macartney-Filgate was twice wounded in action. In March 1918, he was awarded the Military Cross for conspicuous gallantry and devotion to duty when he helped to evacuate the wounded when his artillery battery was heavily shelled. For his service in the war, Macartney-Filgate was decorated by Belgium with the Croix de guerre.

Shortly after the conclusion of the war, he married Beatrice Helen Angela Nevill, the daughter of Sir Reginald Neville, 1st Baronet. Macartney-Filgate also matriculated to University College, Oxford following the war. After graduating from Oxford, he spent time in British India, where he played in a single first-class cricket match for the Europeans cricket team against the Indians at Madras in the 1924–25 Madras Presidency Match. Batting twice in the match, he was dismissed for a single run in the Europeans first innings by T. K. Sukumaran, while in their second innings he was dismissed for 10 runs by M. Venkataramanjulu. By profession he was a merchant banker and was a fellow of the Institute of Bankers.

During the Second World War, he served as a major in the Territorial Army, for which he was decorated with the Territorial Decoration in April 1950. He was appointed a Commander of the Order of the British Empire in 1964. In later life he lived at Danbury, Essex. Macartney-Filgate died in London in July 1964; he was survived by his wife and their three children.
