= William Findlay (cricketer, born 1896) =

English cricketer and soldier

Personal information
- Full name: William Harry Findlay
- Born: 1896; British Malta
- Died: 7 June 1951 (aged 54–55); Marylebone, London, England
- Batting: Unknown
- Bowling: Unknown

Domestic team information
- Years: Team
- 1920/21: Europeans

Career statistics
Competition	First-class
Matches	1
Runs scored	1
Batting average	0.50
100s/50s	–/–
Top score	1
Balls bowled	42
Wickets	1
Bowling average	30.00
5 wickets in innings	–
10 wickets in match	–
Best bowling	1/30
Catches/stumpings	–/–
- Source: Cricinfo, 23 December 2023

William Harry Findlay MC (1896 – 17 June 1951) was an English first-class cricketer and an officer in the British Army.

Findlay was born in British Malta in 1896. He was commissioned into the British Army during the First World War, joining the Cheshire Regiment as a temporary second lieutenant in June 1915. He was awarded the Military Cross in October 1916, for conspicuous gallantry and good work during operations; one example cited described how Findlay guided a party of stretcher bearers to wounded men while under heavy artillery fire. Just before the end of the war, he was appointed a temporary captain whilst commanding a service battalion. After the war, he served in British India, where he played one first-class cricket match for the Europeans cricket team against the Indians at Madras in the 1920–21 Madras Presidency Match. Batting twice in the match from the tail, he was dismissed without scoring in the Europeans first innings by T. Vasu, while in their second innings he was dismissed for a single run by C. R. Ganapathy. With the ball, he took one wicket, that of Vasu in the Indians first innings. He retired from active service in December 1920, retaining the rank of second lieutenant. Findlay later died at Marylebone in June 1951.
