= Cecil Timmins =

English cricketer and soldier (1926 – 2004)

Personal information
- Full name: Cecil Morley Joseph Barry Timmins
- Born: 6 May 1926; Falmouth, Cornwall, England
- Died: January 2004 (aged 77); Falmouth, Cornwall, England
- Batting: Right-handed
- Bowling: Right-arm medium

Domestic team information
- Years: Team
- 1945/46: Europeans
- 1952/53: Travancore-Cochin

Career statistics
| Competition | First-class |
|---|---|
| Matches | 2 |
| Runs scored | 12 |
| Batting average | 3.00 |
| 100s/50s | –/– |
| Top score | 5 |
| Balls bowled | 24 |
| Wickets | 0 |
| Bowling average | – |
| 5 wickets in innings | – |
| 10 wickets in match | – |
| Best bowling | – |
| Catches/stumpings | 3/– |
- Source: Cricinfo, 31 December 2023

Cecil Morley Joseph Barry Timmins (6 May 1926 – January 2004) was an English first-class cricketer and an officer in the British Indian Army.

Timmins was born at Falmouth in May 1926, one of nine children of Cecil Timmins senior and his wife, Violet. They were the proprietors of the Star and Garter public house in Falmouth. Timmins served in the latter stages of the Second World War as a private with the Queen's Royal Regiment, prior to gaining a commission as a second lieutenant in British Indian Army in August 1945, a month prior to the end of the war. Following the end of the war, Timmins played in a first-class cricket match in December 1945 for the Europeans cricket team against the Indians at Madras in the Madras Presidency Match. Following Indian Independence in 1947, Timmins remained in India. He made a second appearance in first-class cricket in the 1952–53 Ranji Trophy for Travancore-Cochin against Mysore at Trivandrum. Timmins struggled across both of his first-class matches, scoring 12 runs from four innings, with a highest score of 5. Timmins later returned to England, where he died at Falmouth in January 2004.
