= John Lunnon =

English cricketer and soldier

Personal information
- Full name: John David Kenyon Lunnon
- Born: 8 April 1897; Fulham, London, England
- Died: 1 February 1963 (aged 65); Littlehampton, Sussex, England
- Batting: Unknown

Domestic team information
- Years: Team
- 1931/32: Europeans

Career statistics
Competition	First-class
Matches	1
Runs scored	15
Batting average	15.00
100s/50s	–/–
Top score	15
Catches/stumpings	–/–
- Source: Cricinfo, 24 December 2023

John David Kenyon Lunnon (8 April 1897 – 1 February 1963) was an English first-class cricketer and an officer in both the British Army and the British Indian Army.

Lunnon was born at Fulham in April 1897. He was commissioned into the British Army in April 1915, nearly one year into the First World War. He was promoted to lieutenant in January 1918 whilst serving with the Essex Regiment, with his promotion antedated to April 1916. Lunnon was appointed to the British Indian Army Reserve of Officers in November 1917, whilst he was made an acting captain whilst commanding a company in August 1918. Following the end of the war, he was promoted to the full rank of captain in the Reserve in April 1919, prior to formally being appointed to the British Indian Army (BIA) in August 1919. Upon his formal appointment, he was made a captain in the BIA in January 1920. In India, he later made a single appearance in first-class cricket for the Europeans cricket team against the Indians at Madras in the 1931–32 Madras Presidency Match. Batting once in the match, he was dismissed for 15 runs in the Europeans first innings R. K. Rao.

In the BIA, he was promoted to major in January 1934, before being promoted to lieutenant colonel in June 1941, during the Second World War. He retired from active service in January 1948, two years and three months after the end of the war and six months after Indian Independence; the latter event resulting in his transfer to the special list of the British Army. Lunnon died at Littlehampton in February 1963.
