= Robert Denniston (cricketer) =

English cricketer and businessman

Sir Robert Denniston
Personal information
- Full name: Robert Dale Denniston
- Born: 3 January 1890; Croydon, Surrey, England
- Died: 19 November 1946 (aged 56); Hythe, Kent, England
- Batting: Unknown
- Bowling: Unknown-arm lob

Domestic team information
- Years: Team
- 1915/16–1925/26: Europeans

Career statistics
Competition	First-class
Matches	7
Runs scored	261
Batting average	20.07
100s/50s	–/3
Top score	84
Balls bowled	18
Wickets	0
Bowling average	–
5 wickets in innings	–
10 wickets in match	–
Best bowling	–
Catches/stumpings	5/–
- Source: Cricinfo, 12 December 2023

Sir Robert Dale Denniston (3 January 1890 – 19 November 1946) was an English first-class cricketer and businessman.

Denniston was born in January 1890 at Croydon. He was educated at both Bedford County School and Elstow School, before going to British India in 1911 to work as a junior assistant at the Madras-based firm Best & Co. There, he was heavily involved in cricket in the city, playing club cricket for the Madras Cricket Club, the Eccentrics Cricket Club, and for the lesser known Emmanuel Club. Four years after his arrival in India, Denniston made his debut in first-class cricket for the Europeans cricket team against the Indians in the 1915–16 Madras Presidency Match. He played first-class cricket for the Europeans until 1926, making seven appearances for the team, all against the Indians in the Madras Presidency Match. Playing as a batsman, he scored 261 runs at an average of 20.07; he made two half centuries, with a highest score of 84. During the First World War, Denniston was commissioned into the British Indian Army as a second lieutenant with the Indian Defence Force in June 1917. His military service ended in March 1919.

After his military service, Denniston resumed his business career with Best and Co., and by the Second World War he was its chairman and managing director. He also served as the chairman of the Madras Chamber of Commerce. It was for his services to business that he was Knighted in the 1942 Birthday Honours. During the Second World War, he was a Ministry of War Transport deputy-representative in Madras. Throughout the 1930s and during the war, he remained active within the cricket community of the Madras Presidency. In 1944, he was given the honour of bowling the first ball to Sir Arthur Hope at the opening of new cricket nets in Madras. At Denniston's suggestion, schoolboys were admitted free of charge to the Madras Cricket Club Ground after 4pm on the last day of Ranji Trophy matches. He commentated on both cricket and field hockey matches, being known for his slow speech and narrative, which drew critics. Denniston left India in 1946, vowing to return, stating "I was born an Englishman, but I was brought up a Madarassi". However, he died following a short illness soon after his return to England, dying at his residence in Hythe, Kent, in November 1946.
