= Gordon Orford =

English cricketer

Personal information
- Full name: Gordon Arthur Orford
- Born: 18 August 1917; Thornton Heath, Surrey, England
- Died: 19 October 2004 (aged 87); Truro, Cornwall, England
- Batting: Right-handed

Domestic team information
- Years: Team
- 1943/44: Europeans

Career statistics
Competition	First-class
Matches	1
Runs scored	4
Batting average	4.00
100s/50s	–/–
Top score	4
Catches/stumpings	–/–
- Source: ESPNcricinfo, 28 November 2022

Gordon Arthur Orford (18 August 1917 — 19 October 2004) was an English first-class cricketer.

Orford was born in August 1917 at Thornton Heath, Surrey. He was educated at Whitgift School, where he played for the school cricket eleven. During the Second World War, Orford was an emergency commission into the Royal Artillery as a second lieutenant in October 1941. While serving in British India during the war, he made a single appearance in first-class cricket for the Europeans cricket team against the Indians at Madras in the Madras Presidency Match of December 1943. Batting once in the match, he was dismissed for 4 runs in the Europeans first innings by A. G. Ram Singh. Orford died at Truro in October 2004.
