= Arthur Miller (cricketer) =

English cricketer and educator

Personal information
- Full name: Arthur Congreve Miller
- Born: 24 January 1877; Bisley, Gloucestershire, England
- Died: 10 March 1947 (aged 70); Milford on Sea, Hampshire, England
- Batting: Unknown
- Bowling: Unknown

Domestic team information
- Years: Team
- 1910/11–1918/19: Europeans

Career statistics
Competition	First-class
Matches	2
Runs scored	76
Batting average	25.33
100s/50s	–/–
Top score	45
Balls bowled	6
Wickets	0
Bowling average	–
5 wickets in innings	–
10 wickets in match	–
Best bowling	–
Catches/stumpings	2/–
- Source: ESPNcricinfo, 1 December 2022

Arthur Congreve Miller OBE JP (24 January 1877 – 10 March 1947) was an English first-class cricketer and educator.

The son of William Miller, he was born in January 1877 at Bisley, Gloucestershire. He was educated at St Edward's School, Oxford, before matriculating to Selwyn College, Cambridge. After graduating from Cambridge, he held a number of assistant master positions at educational establishments in England, Scotland, and South Africa, before joining the Indian Education Service in July 1911. While in British India, Miller played first-class cricket on two occasions for the Europeans cricket team; the first of these came against the Hindus in the final of the Bombay Triangular Tournament at Bombay in September 1910, with his second appearance coming against the Indians in the Madras Presidency match at Madras in January 1919. He scored 76 runs in his two matches, with a highest score of 45.

Miller was appointed an education inspector in 1922 and was made an OBE in the 1924 Birthday Honours. The following year, he was made deputy director of public instruction, before being appointed inspector of European schools in Bombay. Miller's final appointment in India was as headmaster of Rajkumar College, Rajkot. After retiring to England, he was resident at Halberton in Devon and was a justice of the peace for the county. In mid-1945, he moved to Milford on Sea in Hampshire, being appointed a justice of the peace for the county. Miller died at a nursing home in Milford on Sea in March 1947.
