= Howard Dunbar =

English cricketer and British Army officer (1904–1942)

Personal information
- Full name: Howard Cyril Frederick Vella Dunbar
- Born: 20 October 1904; Poona, Bombay Presidency, British India
- Died: 23 July 1942 (aged 37); Ruweisat Ridge, Egypt
- Batting: Right-handed

Domestic team information
- Years: Team
- 1928/29–1929/30: Europeans

Career statistics
Competition	First-class
Matches	3
Runs scored	64
Batting average	10.66
100s/50s	–/–
Top score	28
Catches/stumpings	–/–
- Source: ESPNcricinfo, 2 April 2021

Howard Cyril Frederick Vella Dunbar (20 October 1904 – 23 July 1942) was an English first-class cricketer and British Army officer.

The son of Colonel Benjamin Howard Vella Dunbar DSO and his wife Helen, he was born in British India at Poona. He moved to England at a young age with his parents, where he resided at Clapham Common. He was educated at Ampleforth College, where he played for the cricket XI. Deciding on a career in the British Army, Dunbar attended the Royal Military College, Sandhurst. He graduated into the Royal Tank Corps as a second lieutenant in August 1924, with promotion to lieutenant following in August 1926. He was posted to India in the final years of the 1920s, where he played first-class cricket. He made two appearances for the Europeans cricket team against the Muslims in 1929 and 1930 in the Lahore Tournament, in addition to playing for Punjab Governor's XI against the Muslims at Lahore in 1930. He scored 64 runs in his three first-class matches, with a highest score of 28.

Upon his return to England, he was appointed an assistant instructor at the Tank Driving and Maintenance School at Bovington Camp in June 1934. He was promoted to captain in March 1936, and the following year he relinquished his post at Bovington in May, returning to the establishment. Dunbar served with the now renamed Royal Tank Regiment in the Second World War, seeing promotion to major in August 1941. He saw action in the North African campaign with the 40th (The King's) Royal Tank Regiment. In the midst of the First Battle of El Alamein the British position was precarious, with Rommel's Afrika Korps stopped just short of Alexandria. Arriving in North Africa in July 1942, the 40th were immediately pushed into re-enforcing the British line. With the Axis forces holding the strategically important Ruweisat Ridge, this became a key objective for pushing back the Axis advance. On 23 July 1942, the 40th attacked the ridge, encountering heavy casualties due to Axis mines. Pushing on with the advance, C squadron were soon surrounded by German panzers of the 15th and 21st Panzer Division's, resulting in the loss of 93 of the 104 Valentine tanks which were involved in the assault. Among those killed in action was Dunbar. He was buried at the Alexandria (Hadra) War Memorial Cemetery.
