= Harold Reynolds (cricketer) =

English cricketer and banker (1865 – 1905)

Personal information
- Full name: Harold Reynolds
- Born: Q1 1865; Kensington, London, England
- Died: 8 August 1905 (aged 40); Lahore, Punjab Province, British India
- Batting: Unknown
- Bowling: Unknown

Domestic team information
- Years: Team
- 1895/96: Europeans

Career statistics
Competition	First-class
Matches	1
Runs scored	27
Batting average	27.00
100s/50s	–/–
Top score	27
Balls bowled	61
Wickets	3
Bowling average	9.33
5 wickets in innings	–
10 wickets in match	–
Best bowling	3/10
Catches/stumpings	–/–
- Source: Cricinfo, 30 December 2023

Harold Reynolds (Q1 1865 – 8 August 1905) was an English first-class cricketer.

== Career ==
Reynolds was born at Kensington in the first quarter of 1865. During the late 1880s, he was associated with Kensington Park Cricket Club. He was later employed in British India with the Commercial Bank of India, acting as branch manager in Madras, and latterly at Lahore. In India, Reynolds made a single appearance in first-class cricket for the Europeans cricket team against the Parsees in 1895–96 Bombay Presidency Match. Batting once in the match as an opener alongside Malcolm Jardine, he was dismissed for 27 runs by Nasarvanji Bapasola in the Europeans first innings. With the ball, he took the wickets of Bapasola, Dinshaw Writer, and Bamamji Billimoria in the Parsees second innings. These wickets helped contribute toward a nine wicket victory for the Europeans. Reynolds died from typhoid fever at Lahore in August 1905.
