= Richard Blakeney =

Irish cricketer

Personal information
- Full name: Stephen Richard St Leger Blakeney
- Born: 31 March 1897; Dublin, Ireland
- Died: 1984; Melbourne, Victoria, Australia

Domestic team information
- Years: Team
- 1934/35: Sind
- 1926–1927: Europeans (India)
- 1924–1927: Devon

Career statistics
Competition	First-class
Matches	2
Runs scored	22
Batting average	7.33
100s/50s	–/–
Top score	16
Balls bowled	42
Wickets	1
Bowling average	19.00
5 wickets in innings	–
10 wickets in match	–
Best bowling	1/19
Catches/stumpings	–/–
- Source: Cricinfo, 13 March 2011

Major Stephen Richard St Leger Blakeney (31 March 1897 – 1984) was an Irish cricketer who was born at Dublin.

During the First World War Blakeney served in the Indian Army and was commissioned on 30 January 1917 to the rank of 2nd Lieutenant from the Quetta Cadet College. Now attached to the 76th Punjabis he was admitted to the Indian Army on 10 February 1917, transferred to the 82nd Punjabis 5 September 1917 promoted to Lieutenant 30 January 1918 and to the rank of Captain 30 January 1921.

Returning to England at some point after 1917, he later played Minor Counties Championship cricket for Devon, making his debut for the county in 1924 against Cornwall. He represented Devon in five further matches in 1924 and 1924, the last of which came against Monmouthshire.

Returning to the Raj, Blakeney made his first-class debut for the Europeans (India) against the Marylebone Cricket Club in 1926. In the Marylebone Cricket Club's first-innings he took a single wicket, that of Jack Parsons. In the Europeans first-innings he scored 16 runs before being dismissed by Maurice Tate. He played his second first-class match in 1934 for Sind against Northern India. In the Sind first-innings he scored just a single run before being dismissed by Baqa Jilani, and in their second-innings he scored 5 runs, being dismissed by Khadim Hussain.

He was promoted Major 21 October 1935 and transferred to the Special Unemployed List on 1 June 1936.

At some point later he moved the Australia, where he died in Melbourne, Victoria in 1984, although the exact date isn't known.
