= Gerald Campbell (cricketer) =

English cricketer (1884–1950)

Gerald Victor Campbell (29 April 1884 – 26 March 1950) was an English first-class cricketer active 1905–12 who played for Surrey. He was born in Kensington; died in Lymington.
