= Kenneth McCormack =

English cricketer and British Army officer

Personal information
- Full name: Kenneth Hugh McCormack
- Born: 28 August 1887; Mazagaon, Bombay Presidency, British India
- Died: 25 September 1943 (aged 56); Bombay, Bombay Presidency, British India
- Batting: Unknown

Domestic team information
- Years: Team
- 1914/15–1916/17: Europeans

Career statistics
Competition	First-class
Matches	5
Runs scored	37
Batting average	12.33
100s/50s	–/–
Top score	22*
Catches/stumpings	–/–
- Source: ESPNcricinfo, 21 November 2022

Kenneth Hugh McCormack (28 August 1887 – 25 September 1943) was an English first-class cricketer.

McCormack was born in British India at Mazagaon in August 1887. He was educated in England at Dulwich College, where he played for the cricket eleven. Returning to India, he played first-class cricket for the Europeans cricket team on five occasions in the Bombay Quadrangular Tournament from 1914 to 1916. Playing as a batsman on the Europeans team, he scored 37 runs at an average of 12.33, with a highest score of 22 not out. He was employed in Bombay in the textile industry by Gaddum & Co. McCormack died at Bombay in September 1943.
