= William van Someren =

English cricketer and soldier (1876 – 1939)

Personal information
- Full name: William Weymouth van Someren
- Born: 17 September 1876; Madras, Madras Presidency, British India
- Died: 16 June 1939 (aged 62); British India
- Batting: Unknown

Domestic team information
- Years: Team
- 1910/11: Europeans

Career statistics
Competition	First-class
Matches	1
Runs scored	27
Batting average	27.00
100s/50s	–/–
Top score	27
Catches/stumpings	–/–
- Source: Cricinfo, 31 December 2023

William Weymouth van Someren DSO (17 September 1876 – 16 June 1939) was an English first-class cricketer and an officer in the British Indian Army.

The son of the barrister Godlieb van Someren, he was born in British India at Madras in September 1876. He was educated in England at Clifton College, before attending the Royal Military College at Sandhurst. He graduated from there in August 1896 as a second lieutenant, with a view to his appointment to the British Indian Army (BIA). Shortly after his appointment to the BIA with the 36th Sikhs, van Someren transferred to the 45th Rattray's Sikhs and served with them in the Tirah campaign, where he was present at several of the campaigns engagements. He was made a Companion to the Distinguished Service Order for his actions during the campaign. Following the campaign, he was promoted to lieutenant in July 1899, with promotion to captain following in August 1905.

Between 1903 and 1908, he was seconded to serve with the Burma Military Police. In September 1910, van Someren made a single appearance in first-class cricket for the Europeans cricket team against the Hindus at Bombay in the 1910–11 Bombay Triangular Tournament. Batting once in the match, he was dismissed for 27 runs in the Europeans first innings by Palwankar Baloo. van Someren served in the First World War with the 45th Sikhs, during which he was promoted to major in the opening weeks of the war. He was wounded during the war, and was placed on the half-pay list in December 1916. He would serve the remainder of the conflict with the War Office. van Someren died in India in June 1939.
