= Arthur Fawcett =

English cricketer and military officer

Personal information
- Full name: Arthur Henry Fawcett
- Born: 16 September 1880; Sculcoates, Yorkshire, England
- Died: 11 January 1957 (aged 76); Stannington, Northumberland, England
- Batting: Unknown
- Bowling: Wicket-keeper

Domestic team information
- Years: Team
- 1917/18–1918/19: Europeans

Career statistics
Competition	First-class
Matches	6
Runs scored	29
Batting average	5.80
100s/50s	–/–
Top score	9
Catches/stumpings	6/1
- Source: ESPNcricinfo, 23 June 2019

Arthur Henry Fawcett (16 September 1880 – 11 January 1957) was an English first-class cricketer and an officer in both the British Army and the British Indian Army.

Fawcett was born at Sculcoates near Kingston upon Hull in September 1880. He was commissioned into the King's Regiment in April 1914. He was promoted to the rank of lieutenant in June 1915. By February 1916, he was seconded to the British Indian Army, serving as a lieutenant and then an acting captain. He was promoted to the full rank of captain in June 1917, with precedence to June 1916. While serving in British India, he made his debut in first-class cricket for the Europeans in December 1917 against the Parsees at Bombay in the 1917–18 Bombay Quadrangular. He appeared days later for a combined Europeans and Parsees cricket team against a combined Hindus and Muslims cricket team at Bombay. He played two matches in the 1918–19 Bombay Quadrangular for the Europeans. He resigned from the British Indian Army in May 1922 and returned to England. He played first-class cricket shortly after his return, when he played for the Gentlemen in the 1922 Gentlemen v Players fixture at Scarborough, before appearing days later for C. I. Thornton's XI against the Marylebone Cricket Club South African Touring Team at the same venue. Across his six first-class matches, Fawcett scored 29 with a high score of 9. He died at Stannington in January 1957.
