= Charles Carnegy =

English cricketer and British Army officer

Personal information
- Full name: Charles Gilbert Carnegy
- Born: 29 June 1864; Kurrackel, British India
- Died: 23 April 1928 (aged 63); Stutton, Suffolk, England
- Batting: Unknown
- Bowling: Unknown

Domestic team information
- Years: Team
- 1892/93–1902/03: Europeans

Career statistics
Competition	First-class
Matches	7
Runs scored	72
Batting average	8.00
100s/50s	–/–
Top score	15
Balls bowled	20
Wickets	0
Bowling average	–
5 wickets in innings	–
10 wickets in match	–
Best bowling	–
Catches/stumpings	4/–
- Source: ESPNcricinfo, 22 November 2022

Charles Gilbert Carnegy MVO (29 June 1864 – 23 April 1928) was an English first-class cricketer and British Army officer.

The son of Major-General Alexander Carnegy CB, he was born in British India in June 1864. Carnegy was educated in England at Clifton College, before attending the Royal Military College, Sandhurst. He graduated from there into the Worcestershire Regiment as a lieutenant in August 1884. Soon after he was transferred to the East Yorkshire Regiment, followed by a further transfer to the Bombay Staff Corps in March 1886. He fought against the Burmese resistance movement from 1886 to 1888, in addition to being appointed aide-de-camp to his father in India in June 1887. He was later promoted to captain in August 1895.

While in India, he played first-class cricket for the Europeans cricket team on seven occasions in the Bombay Presidency Match between 1892 and 1902. Carnegy scored 75 runs in these seven matches, at an average of exactly 8 and a high score of 15. Having been previously promoted to major, he was later promoted to lieutenant colonel in February 1909, while serving as commandant with the 107th Pioneers. Carnegy was made a member of the Royal Victorian Order, 4th Class in December 1911. He later served during the First World War, being assigned to the East Surrey Regiment in November 1914, with him being placed in command of a battalion in September 1916. He was made a brevet colonel in January 1917, and commanded the 52nd Graduated Battalion, Rifle Brigade in the latter stages of the war. Carnegy died suddenly on 23 April 1928 at Stutton, Suffolk. He was a member of the wider Northesk family.
