= Reginald Hopkins =

English cricketer and British Indian Army officer

Personal information
- Full name: Reginald Gordon Hopkins
- Born: 6 June 1904; Southsea, Hampshire, England
- Died: 13 November 1982 (aged 78); Fuengirola, Andalusia, Spain
- Batting: Unknown

Domestic team information
- Years: Team
- 1935/36: Bombay
- 1927/28–1937/38: Europeans (India)

Career statistics
Competition	First-class
Matches	10
Runs scored	302
Batting average	17.76
100s/50s	–/1
Top score	53
Balls bowled	–
Wickets	–
Bowling average	–
5 wickets in innings	–
10 wickets in match	–
Best bowling	–
Catches/stumpings	6/–
- Source: Cricinfo, 2 October 2018

Reginald Gordon Hopkins (6 June 1904 – 13 November 1982) was an English first-class cricketer and British Indian Army officer.

Born at Southsea, Hampshire in June 1904, Hopkins was educated at Cheltenham College. He later served in the Army in India Reserve of Officers, holding the rank of lieutenant in 1928 and was promoted captain in 1933 but resigned his commission in January 1938. While living in India, Hopkins made his debut in first-class cricket for the Europeans against the Hindus at Bombay in 1927. Over the course of the next decade, he appeared in ten first-class matches in India, playing seven times for the Europeans, once for Bombay against the touring Australians in 1935, and twice for the Cricket Club of India. He scored 302 runs during his first-class career, averaging 17.76, with a high score of 53. He died at Fuengirola in Spain in November 1982.
