= Peter Brayshay =

English cricketer (1916–2004)

Peter Beldon Brayshay (14 October 1916 – 6 July 2004) was an English first-class cricketer, who played two games for Yorkshire County Cricket Club in 1952.

He was born in Headingley, Leeds, Yorkshire, England, and was a right-handed batsman, who scored 23 runs at 5.75, and a right arm fast bowler who took four wickets at 55.75. He made his Yorkshire debut against Glamorgan in Swansea in 1952, and played in the next game against Derbyshire, where he recorded both his highest score of 13, and his best bowling figures of 2 for 48.

He played on several occasions for Yorkshire's Second XI in the Minor Counties Championship from 1938 to 1951.

Brayshay died aged 87, in July 2004, in Leeds.
