= Malcolm Maclagan =

English cricketer and military engineer

Personal information
- Full name: Malcolm Duperier Maclagan
- Born: 22 May 1907; Murree, Punjab, British India
- Died: August 1997 (aged 90); Dorset, England
- Relatives: Myrtle Maclagan (sister)

Domestic team information
- Years: Team
- 1936–1937: Europeans

Career statistics
Competition	First-class
Matches	2
Runs scored	43
Batting average	10.75
100s/50s	0/0
Top score	21
Balls bowled	18
Wickets	0
Bowling average	–
5 wickets in innings	–
10 wickets in match	–
Best bowling	–
Catches/stumpings	1/–
- Source: ESPNcricinfo, 24 September 2017

Malcolm Duperier Maclagan (22 May 1907 – August 1997) was an English military engineer and first-class cricketer.

Maclagan was born in Murree, Punjab, India on 22 May 1907, the one of four children born to Robert Smeiton Maclagan and Beatrice Ethel (née Duperier). He followed his father into the Royal Engineers, graduating from the Royal Military Academy in 1927. He was promoted to lieutenant in 1930, to captain in 1938, to major in 1944 and to lieutenant colonel in 1950. He retired from the army on 21 May 1959.

During his service, he was posted to India, where he played two first-class cricket matches for the Europeans cricket team. In January 1936, he scored 16 and 4 during an innings loss to the Indians, while in the corresponding fixture the following year, he scored 2 and 21. His sister, Myrtle Maclagan, played fourteen times for the England women's cricket team, scoring over 1,000 runs and taking more than 50 wickets.
