= Henry John =

English cricketer

Henry Celestin Robert John (26 May 1862 – 24 June 1941) was an English cricketer active from 1881 to 1904 who played for Lancashire, the Europeans and Bombay. He was born in Agra and died in Oxford. He appeared in six first-class matches as a righthanded batsman who bowled right arm fast-medium pace. He scored 65 runs with a highest score of 15* and held eight catches. He took 19 wickets with a best analysis of five for 53.
