= Eric Grimley =

English cricketer and soldier

Personal information
- Full name: Eric Henry Donald Grimley
- Born: 25 February 1899; Barrackpore, Bengal Presidency, British India
- Died: 6 December 1969 (aged 70); Cheltenham, Gloucestershire, England
- Batting: Unknown
- Bowling: Unknown

Domestic team information
- Years: Team
- 1929/30: Europeans

Career statistics
Competition	First-class
Matches	1
Runs scored	5
Batting average	2.50
100s/50s	–/–
Top score	5
Balls bowled	12
Wickets	0
Bowling average	–
5 wickets in innings	–
10 wickets in match	–
Best bowling	–
Catches/stumpings	–/–
- Source: ESPNcricinfo, 5 December 2023

Eric Henry Donald Grimley (25 February 1899 – 6 December 1969) was an English first-class cricketer and an officer in the British Army.

The son of W. M. Grimley, he was born in British India at Barrackpore in February 1899. He was educated at Wellington College, where he played for the cricket and rugby teams. From there, he attended the Royal Military College at Sandhurst and graduated into the Northumberland Fusiliers in October 1916. His first two years of service coincided with the last two years of the First World War, with his first promotion to lieutenant coming in April 1918. Following the war, Grimley later served in India, where he made a single appearance in first-class cricket for the Europeans cricket team against the Muslims at Lahore in the 1929–30 Lahore Tournament. Batting twice in the match, he was dismissed for 5 runs in the Europeans first innings by Abdus Salaam, whilst in their second innings he was dismissed without scoring by Jahangir Khan.

In the army, his next promotion to captain followed in November 1929. Grimley was seconded to the Colonial Office in September 1931, where he served with the Royal West African Frontier Force until September 1937. He was promoted to major in August 1938, prior to his secondment to the staff in May 1939. After serving in the Second World War, Grimley served as part of the British occupation force in Germany, where he was Kreis Resident Officer for Bentheim from 1946 to his retirement in February 1949. At this point he was granted the honorary rank of lieutenant colonel. Grimley died at Cheltenham in December 1969.
