= Ralph McCall =

Scottish cricketer

Personal information
- Full name: Ralph Leycester McCall
- Born: 10 April 1884; Stroud, Gloucestershire, England
- Died: 17 August 1945 (aged 61); Edinburgh, Midlothian, Scotland
- Batting: Unknown

Domestic team information
- Years: Team
- 1913/14: Europeans

Career statistics
Competition	First-class
Matches	1
Runs scored	4
Batting average	2.00
100s/50s	–/–
Top score	3
Catches/stumpings	1/–
- Source: Cricinfo, 19 November 2022

Ralph Leycester McCall DSO MC (10 April 1884 — 17 August 1945) was an English-born Scottish first-class cricketer and British Army officer.

The son of William Lockhart McCall, he was born at Stroud in April 1884. He was educated at Haileybury, after which he was commissioned as a second lieutenant into the Gordon Highlanders in June 1901. He served in the Second Boer War, gaining the Queen's South Africa Medal and three clasps. McCall transferred to the Queen's Own Cameron Highlanders in April 1903, and later served with the Highlands at the Beijing Legation Quarter in 2008. McCall was promoted to lieutenant in 1909. He later served in British India, where he made a single appearance in first-class cricket for the Europeans cricket team against Parsees at Poona in the Bombay Presidency Match of 1913. Batting twice in the match, he was dismissed for a single run by Hormasji Kanga in the Europeans first innings, while in their second innings he was dismissed for 3 runs by Jehangir Warden.

Serving in the First World War, McCall was promoted to captain in October 1914. In July 1915, he was awarded the Military Cross for gallantry and devotion to duty while serving as part of the British Expeditionary Force. His decoration came for actions at Hooge, where his company were forced to evacuate while under heavy shelling and gas attack. McCall, alongside a junior officer, rallied their men to mount three counterattacks to drive German troops from their trenches, despite himself being wounded. In November 1916, while a temporary major, he was decorated with the Distinguished Service Order for conspicuous gallantry and skill in an attack for taking command of his battalion following the wounding of his commanding officer, helping to organise the defence of their captured positions and repelling enemy counterattacks, killing five German soldiers himself in the process. McCall was appointed a brevet major in January 1918, before gaining the full rank the following month. In the 1918 Birthday Honours, he was made a brevet lieutenant colonel in recognition of his actions during the Salonika campaign.

McCall's promotion to the full rank of lieutenant colonel did not come until November 1929, at which point he was placed in command of the 2nd Cameron Highlanders. He was placed on the half-pay list in November 1933, and was subsequently transferred to the Territorial Army, being placed in command of the 154th (Argyll and Sutherland) Infantry Brigade, with the rank of colonel. McCall was made an aide-de-camp to George V in July 1934. He relinquished his command of the 154th and retired from active service in November 1937. McCall died at Edinburgh in August 1945.
