= Lovell Wooldridge =

English cricketer

Personal information
- Full name: Lovell William Wooldridge
- Born: 9 December 1901; Quetta, Balochistan, British Raj
- Died: 15 December 1983 (aged 82); Exeter, Devon, England

Domestic team information
- Years: Team
- 1926/27-1929/30: Europeans (India)
- 1926: Devon

Career statistics
Competition	First-class
Matches	3
Runs scored	20
Batting average	5.00
100s/50s	–/–
Top score	18
Balls bowled	354
Wickets	5
Bowling average	39.40
5 wickets in innings	–
10 wickets in match	–
Best bowling	3/69
Catches/stumpings	1/–
- Source: ESPNcricinfo, 1 March 2011

Lovell William Wooldridge (9 December 1901 – 15 December 1983) was an English cricketer. He was born in Quetta, Balochistan which was then in the British Raj. He was educated at Wellington College, Berkshire where he played for the college cricket team.

Wooldridge played for Devon in the 1926 Minor Counties Championship, making his debut against Monmouthshire. He played four further matches for Devon in 1926, playing his final Championship match against Monmouthshire. Later in 1926, Wooldridge returned to the British Raj, where he made his first-class debut for the Europeans (India) against the Marylebone Cricket Club. Four years later he played two further first-class matches, one for the Europeans, which came against the Muslims and the other for the Punjab Governor's XI against the Muslims. In his three first-class matches he scored 20 runs at a batting average of 5.00, with a high score of 18. With the ball he took 5 wickets at a bowling average of 39.40, with best figures of 3/69.

He died in Exeter, Devon on 15 December 1983.
