= Kenneth Robathan =

English cricketer, soldier and clergyman

Personal information
- Full name: Kenneth Minshull Robathan
- Born: 1 September 1889; Agra, North-Western Provinces, British India
- Died: 2 February 1965 (aged 75); Ringwood, Hampshire, England
- Batting: Unknown
- Bowling: Unknown

Domestic team information
- Years: Team
- 1920/21: Europeans

Career statistics
Competition	First-class
Matches	1
Runs scored	44
Batting average	22.00
100s/50s	–/–
Top score	40
Balls bowled	84
Wickets	4
Bowling average	6.50
5 wickets in innings	–
10 wickets in match	–
Best bowling	4/26
Catches/stumpings	1/–
- Source: ESPNcricinfo, 24 November 2023

Kenneth Minshull Robathan (1 September 1889 – 2 February 1965) was an English first-class cricketer, British Indian Army officer and clergyman.

The son of The Reverend Thomas Robathan, he was born in British India at Agra in September 1889. He was educated in England, firstly at the Church Missionary School in Limpsfield, before proceeding to Merchant Taylors' School; there he played for and captained the school cricket team. From there, matriculated to Caius College, Cambridge. After graduating from Cambridge, Robathan went to British India in 1912, where he was in business. He served in the First World War on the Western Front with the British Indian Army, being commissioned as a second lieutenant in the 2nd Gurkha Rifles in September 1915. Promotion to lieutenant followed in September 1916, before being made an acting captain in March 1918. Following the war, he made a single appearance in first-class cricket for the Europeans cricket team against the Parsees at Bombay in the 1920–21 Bombay Quadrangular. Batting twice in the match, he opened the batting and was dismissed for 40 runs in the Europeans first innings by P. H. Daruwala, while in their second innings he once again opened the batting and was dismissed for 4 runs by M. B. Vatcha. As a bowler, he took 4 wickets for the cost of 26 runs in the Parsees second innings.

Robathan later returned to England, where he followed in his father's footsteps by becoming a clergyman. He held ecclesiastical appointments at Dethick, Lea and Holloway in Derbyshire, Lee-on-the-Solent in Hampshire, and latterly at Potterne in Wiltshire. Robathan died in February 1965 at Ringwood, Hampshire.
