= Edwin Hardy =

English cricketer (1892–1968)

Personal information
- Full name: Edwin Pearce Hardy
- Born: 20 August 1892; Esholt, Yorkshire, England
- Died: 31 December 1968 (aged 76); Little Bookham, Surrey, England

Domestic team information
- Years: Team
- 1915/16: Europeans (India)

Career statistics
| Competition | First-class |
|---|---|
| Matches | 3 |
| Runs scored | 103 |
| Batting average | 51.50 |
| 100s/50s | 0/1 |
| Top score | 53 |
| Catches/stumpings | –/– |
- Source: ESPNcricinfo, 10 February 2022

Edwin Pearce Hardy (20 August 1892 – 31 December 1968) was an English first-class cricketer.

Born at Esholt, Hardy made two appearances for the Yorkshire 2nd XI in the 1910 Minor Counties Championship. He studied at Durham University, where he played for his college, Hatfield Hall, as well as the university side; he graduated with a Bachelor of Arts in 1914.

Hardy represented the Europeans cricket team during the 1915 Bombay Quadrangular. He had his first-class debut against the Muslims on 9 September, where he made 36 runs not out in his only innings. In the final played four days later against the Hindus he was bowled lbw after 14 runs by Palwankar Baloo.

He played his first and last match for England on 13 December 1915, facing India as part of a scratch team of cricketing soldiers and civil servants (among them the Governor of Bombay) and scored 53 runs in what was a comfortable "England" victory.
