= Reginald Sinclair =

English cricketer

Personal information
- Full name: Reginald Leahy Sinclair
- Born: 20 April 1874; Kolhapur, Bombay Presidency, British India
- Died: 23 March 1928 (aged 53); Ditchling, Sussex, England
- Batting: Unknown
- Bowling: Unknown

Domestic team information
- Years: Team
- 1893/94–1903/04: Europeans
- 1902/03: Bombay

Career statistics
Competition	First-class
Matches	14
Runs scored	88
Batting average	6.28
100s/50s	–/–
Top score	45
Balls bowled	1,945
Wickets	64
Bowling average	11.23
5 wickets in innings	7
10 wickets in match	1
Best bowling	6/34
Catches/stumpings	6/–
- Source: Cricinfo, 26 November 2022

Reginald Leahy Sinclair JP (20 April 1874 — 23 March 1928) was an English first-class cricketer and an officer in the Indian Civil Service.

The son of George Sinclair, a surgeon, he was born in British India at Kolhapur in April 1874. He was educated in England at Repton School, where he played for the school cricket team. After completing his education, he proceeded to India where he was an assistant collector of salt revenues and a justice of the peace. He was awarded the Kaisar-i-Hind Medal for work during the Indian famine of 1899–1900. While in India, Sinclair played first-class cricket from 1893 to 1903 on fourteen occasions, thirteen of which came for the Europeans cricket team in the Bombay Presidency Match, with a further appearance for Bombay against the touring Oxford University Authentics in 1902. A prolific wicket-taker, Sinclair took 64 wickets in first-class cricket at an average of 11.23, taking a five wicket haul on three occasions and took ten wickets in a match once. His best innings figures of 6 for 34 against the Parsees in August 1895, a match which saw him taking match figures of 11 for 77. Playing as a lower order batsman, he scored 88 runs at a batting average of 6.28. His highest score with the bat was 45, which came for Bombay; his next highest score was 14 for the Europeans. Sinclair later retired to England, where he died in March 1928 at Ditchling, Sussex.
