= Peter Dowson =

English cricketer and British Army officer

Personal information
- Full name: Peter Malcolm Dowson
- Born: 30 March 1915; Breamore, Hampshire, England
- Died: 25 June 2004 (aged 89); Somerset, England
- Batting: Right-handed
- Bowling: Right-arm fast-medium

Domestic team information
- Years: Team
- 1937/38–1938/39: Europeans
- 1937/38: Bombay

Career statistics
Competition	First-class
Matches	5
Runs scored	155
Batting average	15.50
100s/50s	–/1
Top score	50
Balls bowled	674
Wickets	9
Bowling average	35.11
5 wickets in innings	–
10 wickets in match	–
Best bowling	3/74
Catches/stumpings	3/–
- Source: Cricinfo, 5 June 2022

Peter Malcolm Dowson MC (30 March 1915 – 25 June 2004) was an English cricketer and British Indian Army officer.

Dowson was born in March 1915 at Breamore, Hampshire. He was educated at Rugby School, from where he went to British India. Dowson played first-class cricket in India, making his debut for the Europeans cricket team against the Cricket Club of India at Bombay in December 1937. Over the following eleven months, he played four further first-class matches; three for the Europeans, and one for Bombay in the Ranji Trophy against Nawanagar. In five first-class matches, Dowson scored 155 runs at an average of 15.50, with a highest score of 50. With his right-arm fast-medium bowling, he took 9 wickets with best figures of 3 for 74. Dowson served in the British Army during the Second World War, being commissioned into the Royal Artillery as a second lieutenant from an Officers' Training Corps unit in June 1940. Following the end of the war, at which point he was a temporary major, he was awarded the Military Cross for gallantry and distinguished service during the Burma Campaign; he was additionally mentioned in dispatches in May 1946 for his part in that campaign. After the war, Dowson emigrated to South Africa where was employed by Shell as an assistant general manager in 1958. He later returned to England, where he died in Somerset in June 2004.
