= Herbert Chaplin =

English cricketer

Personal information
- Full name: Herbert Percy Chaplin
- Born: 1 March 1883; Westminster, London, England
- Died: 6 March 1970 (aged 87); Deal, Kent, England

Herbert Percy Chaplin (1 March 1883 – 6 March 1970) was an English cricketer active from 1904 to 1914 who played for Sussex and was club captain from 1910 to 1914. He was born in Westminster and died in Deal, Kent. He appeared in 176 first-class matches as a righthanded batsman who bowled right arm medium pace. He scored 6,497 runs with a highest score of 213 not out among seven centuries and took eight wickets with a best performance of three for 47.

He was educated at Harrow School.
