= Hugo Armitage =

English cricketer and soldier (1895–1966)

Personal information
- Full name: Hugo Evans Armitage
- Born: 28 April 1895; Wallington, Surrey, England
- Died: 1966 (aged 70/71); Marlborough, Wiltshire, England
- Batting: Unknown
- Bowling: Unknown

Domestic team information
- Years: Team
- 1927/28: Europeans

Career statistics
Competition	First-class
Matches	1
Runs scored	6
Batting average	3.00
100s/50s	–/–
Top score	6
Balls bowled	30
Wickets	0
Bowling average	–
5 wickets in innings	–
10 wickets in match	–
Best bowling	–
Catches/stumpings	–/–
- Source: ESPNcricinfo, 15 May 2023

Hugo Evans Armitage (28 April 1895 — 1966) was an English first-class cricketer and an officer in both the British Army and the British Indian Army.

The son Ernest Armitage, he was born at Wallington in April 1895. Armitage began his career in the British Army prior to the First World War as a rifleman with the London Regiment. He gained a commission in the First World War as a temporary second lieutenant; initially with the Tank Corps and then with the Green Howards, before being appointed to the Army Cyclist Corps, appointments which all happened in August 1915. In August 1916, he was made a temporary lieutenant, before being made a temporary captain whilst serving with the Machine Gun Corps in December 1917. Armitage was transferred to the British Indian Army following the end of the war, where he was appointed as a temporary lieutenant in December 1918. Whilst commanding a company in the 33rd Punjabis, he was appointed a temporary captain in July 1919; he gained the full rank of captain in May 1920.

Whilst serving in British India, Armitage made a single appearance in first-class cricket for the Europeans cricket team against the Hindus at Lahore in the 1927–28 Lahore Tournament. Batting twice in the match, he was dismissed for 6 runs opening the batting by Gurdit Singh, whilst in their second innings he batted from the middle order and was dismissed without scoring by Jagan Mehta. He retired from active service in March 1933. He was recalled to active service during the Second World War, serving in the British Indian Army as a brevet major in November 1939. Armitage later died in England at Marlborough in 1966.
