= Francis Townend =

English cricketer and British Army officer

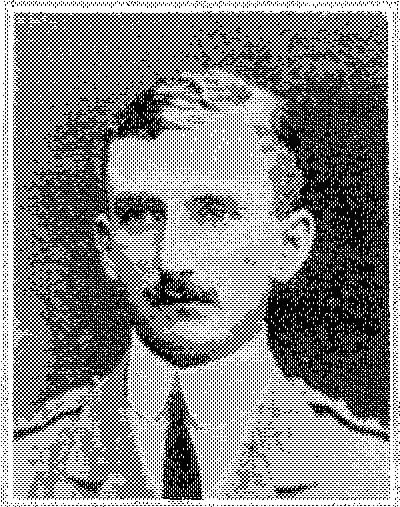

Personal information
- Full name: Francis Whitchurch Townend
- Born: 10 July 1885; Halifax, Nova Scotia, Canada
- Died: 29 March 1915 (aged 29); Béthune, Pas-de-Calais, France
- Batting: Unknown

Domestic team information
- Years: Team
- 1908/09: Europeans

Career statistics
Competition	First-class
Matches	3
Runs scored	95
Batting average	15.83
100s/50s	–/1
Top score	69
Catches/stumpings	1/–
- Source: ESPNcricinfo, 27 March 2021

Francis Whitchurch Townend (10 July 1885 – 29 March 1915) was an English first-class cricketer and British Army officer.

Townend was born at Halifax, Nova Scotia to The Reverend Alfred Townend, a former Army Chaplain, and his wife, Margaret. He was sent to England to be educated, where he was taught on the Isle of Wight at Appuldurcombe, before attending Camberley School. From there he attended Dulwich College. He left Dulwich in 1901 to attend the Royal Military Academy, Woolwich where he played cricket and football for the academy. Townend graduated into the Royal Engineers as a second lieutenant in February 1904. He spent a further two years at the Royal School of Military Engineering, before being promoted to lieutenant in September 1906. In the same year he was posted to British India, where he was attached to the 3rd Sappers and Miners. While serving in India, Townend played first-class cricket for the Europeans cricket team in 1908, making three appearances; two against the Parsees and one against the Hindus. Playing as a batsman, Townend scored 95 runs across his three matches, with a highest score of 69. Besides playing in first-class matches, he was a well known cricketer for the Royal Engineers and also played minor matches for the Free Foresters and the British Indian Army.

Townend served in the First World War, travelling with the Indian Expeditionary Force and arriving in France in October 1914. In the same month he was also promoted to captain. Upon his arrival in France, he was attached to the 35th Divisional Signals Company, followed by attachment to the Dehra Dun Brigade, serving with the latter in the Battle of Neuve Chapelle in March 1915. Later that month he was laying telephone lines at Béthune, when he was seriously wounded when a German shell exploded nearby. He was taken to hospital "conscious and perfectly collected", but succumbed to his wounds shortly after. Townend was buried at the Béthune Town Cemetery. He was posthumously mentioned in dispatches by Field Marshal Sir John French in June 1915.
