= William Horton (cricketer) =

English cricketer

William Henry Francis Kenneth Horton (Brentford, Middlesex 25 April 1906 – Hove, Sussex 31 October 1986) was an English cricketer.

William Horton was educated at Stonyhurst for whom he represented the 1st XI. As a right-handed batsman, he represented Middlesex in two matches in 1927 and the Europeans in India in two matches between 1929/1930 and 1934/1935.
