= Harry Lowis =

English cricketer and soldier

Personal information
- Full name: Harry Elliott Lowis
- Born: 9 September 1864; Calcutta, Bengal Presidency, British India
- Died: 13 February 1938 (aged 73); Marylebone, London, England
- Batting: Unknown
- Bowling: Unknown

Domestic team information
- Years: Team
- 1892/93–1897/98: Europeans
- 1902/03: Bombay

Career statistics
Competition	First-class
Matches	6
Runs scored	163
Batting average	18.11
100s/50s	–/1
Top score	72
Balls bowled	160
Wickets	4
Bowling average	22.50
5 wickets in innings	–
10 wickets in match	–
Best bowling	1/5
Catches/stumpings	2/–
- Source: ESPNcricinfo, 30 November 2023

Harry Elliott Lowis (9 September 1864 – 13 February 1938) was an English first-class cricketer and an officer in both the British Army and the British Indian Army.

The son of Edmund Elliot Lowis, he was born in British India at Calcutta in September 1864. He attended the Royal Military College at Sandhurst, graduating from there as a lieutenant into the 1st West India Regiment in May 1885. In April 1889, he transferred to the British Indian Army, with promotion to captain following in May 1896. In India, Lowis played first-class cricket, making his first-class debut for the Europeans cricket team against the Parsees at Bombay in the 1892–93 Bombay Presidency Match; this was the first cricket match played in India with first-class status. Between 1892 and 1897, he played in five first-class matches for the Europeans, in addition to playing for Bombay against the touring Oxford University Authentics in November 1902. In six first-class matches, he scored 163 runs at an average of 18.11; he made one half century, a score of 72. With the ball, he took 4 wickets at a bowling average of 22.50.

He continued to serve in the British Indian Army into the 1900s, gaining promotion to the rank of major in May 1903 and lieutenant colonel in January 1911. He spent time in British Hong Kong with the 119th Infantry from at least 1903 to 1906. Serving with the 10th Jats during the First World War, he was conferred the rank of brevet colonel in October 1915 as a reward for distinguished service in the field. In March 1916, he was mentioned in dispatches during Operations in the Tochi for commanding a frontal attack with great skill against a force of Khostwal tribesmen estimated at some 7–8,000. Lowis gained the full rank of colonel in January 1917, and was later made a temporary brigadier-general when he was appointed an inspector of depots in September 1917.

He retired from active service in April 1920, nearly two years after the conclusion of the First World War. Lowis returned to England, where he retired to Westward Ho! in Devon. He died while visiting Marylebone on 13 February 1938.
