= Harold Pogson =

English cricketer and colonial police officer

Personal information
- Full name: Harold Pogson
- Born: 24 August 1870; Kolhapur, Bombay Presidency, British India
- Died: 22 February 1906 (aged 35); Rajkot, Bombay Presidency, British India
- Batting: Unknown
- Bowling: Unknown

Domestic team information
- Years: Team
- 1894/95: Europeans

Career statistics
Competition	First-class
Matches	1
Runs scored	9
Batting average	4.50
100s/50s	–/–
Top score	9
Balls bowled	15
Wickets	0
Bowling average	–
5 wickets in innings	–
10 wickets in match	–
Best bowling	–
Catches/stumpings	2/–
- Source: ESPNcricinfo, 8 December 2023

Harold Pogson (24 August 1870 – 22 February 1906) was an English first-class cricketer and a colonial police officer in British India.

The son of the General John Pogson, he was born in British India at Kolhapur in August 1870. He later joined the Indian Imperial Police, where he would become the Superintendent of Police and Commandant of the Military Police for the Kathiawar Agency. In India, he made a single appearance in first-class cricket for the Europeans cricket team against the Parsees at Bombay in the 1894–95 Bombay Presidency Match. Batting twice in the match, he was dismissed for 9 runs in the Europeans first innings by Kekhashru Mistry, while in their second innings he was dismissed without scoring by Dinshaw Writer. He was a well known cricketer in Bombay and was a member of the Rajkot Cricket Club. Pogson died at Rajkot on 22 February 1906, from heat apoplexy leading to heart failure.
