= Malcolm Salter =

English cricketer

Personal information
- Born: 10 May 1887; Cheltenham, Gloucestershire
- Died: 15 June 1973 (aged 86); Chesham Bois, Buckinghamshire
- Batting: Right-handed

Domestic team information
- Years: Team
- 1907-1927: Gloucestershire
- Source: ESPNcricinfo, 30 March 2014

Malcolm Gurney Salter (10 May 1887 – 15 June 1973) was an English cricketer. He played for Gloucestershire between 1907 and 1927.
