= Leslie Lloyd =

English cricketer and soldier

Personal information
- Full name: Leslie Skipp Lloyd
- Born: 24 June 1891; Paddington, London, England
- Died: 30 April 1966 (aged 74); Basingstoke, Hampshire, England
- Batting: Unknown
- Bowling: Unknown

Domestic team information
- Years: Team
- 1924/25: Europeans

Career statistics
Competition	First-class
Matches	1
Runs scored	1
Batting average	1.00
100s/50s	–/–
Top score	1
Balls bowled	178
Wickets	6
Bowling average	20.50
5 wickets in innings	1
10 wickets in match	–
Best bowling	6/100
Catches/stumpings	–/–
- Source: ESPNcricinfo, 30 November 2023

Leslie Skipp Lloyd MC (24 June 1891 – 30 April 1966) was an English first-class cricketer and British Army officer. Lloyd served in the British Army with the Royal Hussars and the Dragoon Guards from 1913 to 1946, seeing action in both the First and the Second World Wars. At the point at which he retired, he held the rank of honorary brigadier. His military service took him to British India in the inter-war period, where he played first-class cricket for the Europeans cricket team.

== Early life and WWI service ==
The son of Francis Montagu Lloyd, he was born at Paddington in May 1876. He was educated at Clifton College, representing the college in boxing. From there, he matriculated to Christ Church, Oxford. He represented Oxford University against Cambridge University in the featherweight varsity boxing match of 1911. Whilst still at Oxford, Lloyd was commissioned into the British Army as a second lieutenant in the Territorial Force in March 1913. He was later appointed to the 18th Royal Hussars in August of that year, with his appointment being antedated to January 1912. Lloyd served in the First World War, gaining promotion to lieutenant around six months into the war. In February 1917, he was made a temporary captain, a rank he relinquished the following month. He had by this point been conferred the Military Cross. Lloyd was wounded in action on 9 August 1918, at the start of the Hundred Days Offensive.

== Later military career ==
Following the war, Lloyd was promoted to captain upon his appointment as an adjutant in June 1919. Whilst serving with the Hussars in British India, Lloyd made a single appearance in first-class cricket for the Europeans cricket team against the Hindus at Bombay in the 1924–25 Bombay Quadrangular. He had success in the match, taking figures of 6 for 100 in the Hindus first innings. In January 1925, he was seconded whilst a student at the Staff College. In July of the same year he transferred to the 3rd/6th Dragoon Guards, at which point he was made a major. He was appointed to the War Office in October 1927, before being made a brevet lieutenant colonel in January 1935, and gaining the rank in full in October that of year. He was promoted to colonel in January 1938, upon his appointment to quartermaster-general.

Lloyd served during the Second World War and was appointed military commander of the Samaria District in Mandatory Palestine in May 1941. He retired from military service in December 1946, by which time the war had come to an end, at which point he was made an honorary brigadier. Lloyd died at Basingstoke in April 1966, at the age of 74.
