= Philip Sanderson =

English cricketer

Personal information
- Full name: Philip MacDonnell Sanderson
- Born: 14 March 1884; Elstree, Hertfordshire, England
- Died: 7 September 1957 (aged 73); Tenterden, Kent, England
- Batting: Unknown
- Role: Wicket-keeper

Domestic team information
- Years: Team
- 1905/06–1920/21: Europeans

Career statistics
Competition	First-class
Matches	2
Runs scored	9
Batting average	9.00
100s/50s	–/–
Top score	5*
Catches/stumpings	4/–
- Source: Cricinfo, 30 November 2022

Philip MacDonnell Sanderson (14 March 1884 — 7 September 1957) was an English first-class cricketer and an officer in the British Army.

The eleventh of thirteen children of The Reverend Lancelot Sanderson and his wife, Katherine, he was born at Elstree in March 1884. Sanderson was educated at Malvern College, before matriculating to King's College, Cambridge. After graduating, he went to British India where he was a merchant. While in India, Sanderson played first-class cricket for the Europeans cricket team in the 1905–06 Bombay Presidency Match against the Hindus at Bombay. Sanderson served in the First World War, being commissioned as a lieutenant in September 1914 and later joining the Worcestershire Regiment. He sailed to take part in the Gallipoli campaign in July 1915, gaining the rank of captain during the campaign. Having survived the ill-fated allied campaign, Sanderson married Eileen Rendall in January 1917.

Following the war, he returned to British India as a merchant. There he played a further first-class match for the Europeans against the Parsees in the 1920–21 Bombay Quadrangular Tournament at Bombay. In his two first-class matches, he scored 9 runs with a highest score of 5 not out. Sanderson had returned to England by 1939, where he was resident at Brockley Hill at Hertfordshire, and was a wine merchant managing director. He died in September 1957 at Tenterden, Kent. He was survived by his wife, who died 22 years later.
