= Wallscourt Kelly =

Australian cricketer

Personal information
- Full name: Wallscourt Steen Kelly
- Born: 16 June 1895; Elsternwick, Victoria, Australia
- Died: 10 June 1952 (aged 56); Ivanhoe, Victoria, Australia
- Batting: Unknown
- Bowling: Unknown

Domestic team information
- Years: Team
- 1924/25–1927/28: Europeans

Career statistics
Competition	First-class
Matches	4
Runs scored	74
Batting average	9.25
100s/50s	–/–
Top score	32
Balls bowled	432
Wickets	24
Bowling average	13.58
5 wickets in innings	1
10 wickets in match	–
Best bowling	6/57
Catches/stumpings	–/–
- Source: Cricinfo, 17 November 2022

Lieutenant Colonel Wallscourt Steen Kelly (16 June 1895 – 10 June 1952) was an Australian first-class cricketer and British Indian Army officer.

The son of Alex Kelly, he was born in the Melbourne suburb of Elsternwick in June 1895. Kelly was educated at both Melbourne Grammar School and Geelong Grammar School. Kelly served in the First Australian Imperial Force during the First World War, seeing action on the Western Front as a lieutenant. He was wounded at the Polygon Wood during the Third Battle of Ypres in September 1917, before being appointed to the British Indian Army in March 1918 as a second lieutenant on probation, with his appointment being confirmed in March 1919. By November 1920, he was serving with the 41st Dogras with the rank of temporary captain, a rank to which he was appointed to permanently in September 1922.

While serving in British India, Kelly played first-class cricket on four occasions for the Europeans cricket team in the Lahore Tournament from 1925 to 1928. Playing as a bowler in the Europeans side, he took 24 wickets at an average of 13.58; he took one five wicket haul of 6 for 57 against the Muslims in 1925. In the 1938, he fought in the Waziristan campaign alongside native Indian troops against hostile tribesmen. Following his retirement from the British Indian Army on 22 February 1948 he returned to Australia where he died at his residence at Ivanhoe in Melbourne in June 1952.
