= Walter Vezey =

English cricketer and soldier

Personal information
- Full name: Walter John Vezey
- Born: 12 January 1901; Edmonton, London, England
- Died: 4 April 1926 (aged 25); Arawali, North-West Frontier Province, British India
- Batting: Unknown
- Bowling: Unknown

Domestic team information
- Years: Team
- 1925/26: Europeans

Career statistics
Competition	First-class
Matches	2
Runs scored	49
Batting average	16.33
100s/50s	–/–
Top score	21
Balls bowled	112
Wickets	3
Bowling average	19.33
5 wickets in innings	–
10 wickets in match	–
Best bowling	3/18
Catches/stumpings	4/–
- Source: Cricinfo, 31 December 2023

Walter John Vezey (12 January 1901 – 4 April 1926) was an English first-class cricketer and an officer in the British Indian Army.

The son of Peter Vezey and his wife, Lottie, he was born at Edmonton in January 1901. He was educated at Haileybury, before going up to the Royal Military Academy at Woolwich. From there, he graduated as a second lieutenant into the Royal Engineers and was later attached to the Royal Bombay Sappers in British India. He was promoted to lieutenant in July 1922. Whilst in India, Vezey made two appearances in first-class cricket for the Europeans cricket team against the Sikhs and the Muslims in the 1925–26 Lahore Tournament. He scored 49 runs in his two matches, with a highest score of 21, while with the ball, he took 3 wickets at an average of 19.33. While a passenger on 4 April 1926 aboard a DH.9A of No. 60 Squadron RAF flown by Pilot Officer David John Lloyd, Vezey was killed when the aircraft crashed in the North-West Frontier Province; the pilot was also killed in the crash.
