= John Cocks (cricketer) =

English cricketer and soldier

Personal information
- Full name: John James Crofts Cocks
- Born: 18 February 1895; Colchester, Essex, England
- Died: 26 May 1927 (aged 32) at sea, off the coast of Turkey
- Batting: Unknown
- Role: Wicket-keeper

Domestic team information
- Years: Team
- 1925/26–1926/27: Europeans
- 1926/27: Army
- 1926/27: Southern Punjab
- 1926/27: Northern India

Career statistics
Competition	First-class
Matches	8
Runs scored	97
Batting average	12.12
100s/50s	–/–
Top score	33
Catches/stumpings	6/2
- Source: ESPNcricinfo, 9 November 2023

John James Crofts Cocks (18 February 1895 – 27 May 1927) was an English first-class cricketer and an officer in the British Army, and later the Royal Air Force.

Cocks was born at Colchester in February 1895 and was educated at Haileybury. Cocks was commissioned into the Welch Regiment as a second lieutenant on probation in March 1914, with him being confirmed in the rank following his graduation from the Royal Military College in July 1915. He served in the First World War with the Welch Regiment, being promoted to lieutenant in July 1916.

After the war, Cocks was granted a short service commission in the Royal Air Force as a flying officer in March 1923. Whilst serving in British India, he made his debut in first-class cricket for the Europeans cricket team against the Sikhs at Lahore in the 1925–26 Lahore Tournament, before making two further appearances for the Europeans against the Parsees and the Hindus in the 1926–27 Bombay Quadrangular Tournament. He made a series of first-class appearances in November 1926 against the touring Marylebone Cricket Club, making an appearance each for the Europeans, the Indian Army, the Rawalpindi Sports Club, Southern Punjab, and Northern India. In eight first-class matches, he scored 97 runs at an average of 12.12, with a highest score of 33; as a wicket-keeper, he took six catches and made two stumpings.

Cocks was the owner of an Airco DH.9, which he had assembled from two different DH.9's. Whilst returning to England from India using his plane, Cocks and his passenger, L. A. C. Rowston, were killed when the plane crashed off the coast of Turkey, fifteen days into their journey home which had begun on 11 May 1927. A search was conducted by the Turkish authorities, but neither the plane nor their bodies were recovered.
