= Bruce Manson (cricketer) =

English cricketer and British Army officer (1878–1914)

Personal information
- Full name: Bruce Edward Alexander Manson
- Born: 7 December 1878; British India
- Died: 4 November 1914 (aged 35); Tanga, German East Africa
- Batting: Unknown
- Bowling: Unknown

Domestic team information
- Years: Team
- 1903/04: Europeans

Career statistics
Competition	First-class
Matches	1
Runs scored	8
Batting average	4.00
100s/50s	–/–
Top score	7
Balls bowled	132
Wickets	3
Bowling average	18.00
5 wickets in innings	–
10 wickets in match	–
Best bowling	3/54
Catches/stumpings	–/–
- Source: ESPNcricinfo, 25 March 2021

Bruce Edward Alexander Manson (7 December 1878 – 4 November 1914) was an English first-class cricketer and British Indian Army officer.

Manson was born in British India in December 1878 to F. B. Manson of the Imperial Forest Service and his wife, Emily. He joined the British Indian Army in July 1898 as an unattached second lieutenant, having graduated from the Royal Military College, Sandhurst. The following year, he was appointed to the Indian Staff Corps. He saw action in China in 1900 during the Boxer Rebellion, for which he was decorated by the United States with the Military Order of the Dragon. In October 1900, he was promoted to lieutenant. While serving in British India, he played in a first-class cricket match in 1903 for the Europeans cricket team against the Parsees at Poona in the Bombay Presidency Match. Batting twice in the match, he was dismissed for a single run in the Europeans' first innings by Maneksha Bulsara, while in their second innings, he was dismissed by the same bowler for 7 runs. As a bowler, he took 3 wickets in the Parsees' first innings. By 1907, Manson was serving with the 61st Pioneers and was promoted to captain in July of the same year. George V visited India in 1911, with Manson appointed as his aide-de-camp during the Delhi Durbar. He later served in the First World War and was part of the Indian Expeditionary Force tasked with capturing German East Africa. Landing ashore near Tanga on the evening of 3 November 1914, the following day the Expeditionary Force marched on the city proper. However, the advance quickly turned into a disaster, with the Expeditionary Force forced to withdraw following heavy casualties. Amongst them was Manson, killed in action during the fighting on 4 November.
