= Sydenham Somers-Cox =

South African cricketer and soldier

Personal information
- Full name: Sydenham John Somers-Cox
- Born: 18 July 1895; Johannesburg, South African Republic
- Died: 1972 (aged 76–77); Borrowdale, Rhodesia
- Batting: Unknown
- Bowling: Unknown

Domestic team information
- Years: Team
- 1917/18: Europeans

Career statistics
Competition	First-class
Matches	1
Runs scored	2
Batting average	2.00
100s/50s	–/–
Top score	1*
Balls bowled	42
Wickets	1
Bowling average	39.00
5 wickets in innings	–
10 wickets in match	–
Best bowling	1/39
Catches/stumpings	2/–
- Source: Cricinfo, 25 December 2023

Sydenham John Somers-Cox MC (18 July 1895 – 1972) was a South African first-class cricketer and an officer in both the British Army and the British Indian Army.

The son of Sydenham Easton Southall-Cox, he was born at Johannesburg in July 1895. Upon the outbreak of the First World War, he joined the British Army from the Royal Military College as a second lieutenant with the Worcestershire Regiment in May 1915. He was made a temporary captain in September 1915, prior to being appointed an adjutant and temporary lieutenant in November 1915; he gained the full rank of lieutenant in October 1916. Somers-Cox was awarded the Military Cross in November 1916, for conspicuous gallantry and devotion to duty when he organised the defence of his lines following the deaths of his commanding officer and senior ranked comrades, doing so with courage and fearlessness. In July 1918, he was appointed to the British Indian Army (BIA) as a lieutenant with the 97th Deccan Infantry. In India, he made a single appearance in first-class cricket for the Europeans against the Parsees at Bombay in 1917–18 Bombay Quadrangular. Batting twice in the match, he was dismissed for a single run in the Europeans first innings by M. B. Vatcha, while in their second innings he was unbeaten on a single run. Opening the bowling in the Parsees first innings, he took the wicket of Hormasji Kanga for the cost of 39 runs from seven overs.

Somers-Cox commanded a company in the 129th Baluchis until February 1919, by which point the war had ended. In May 1919, he was promoted to captain, followed by promotion to major in May 1933. Following a period as an instructor in the 1930s, he was promoted to lieutenant colonel in October 1937. After serving in the Second World War, he retired from the BIA in July 1946. Somers-Cox later retired to the Salisbury suburb of Borrowdale in Rhodesia, where he died in 1972.
