= William Halliley =

English cricketer

Personal information
- Full name: William Sydney Halliley
- Born: 7 February 1888; British Ceylon
- Died: 6 September 1963 (aged 75); Pembury, Kent, England
- Batting: Unknown
- Bowling: Unknown

Domestic team information
- Years: Team
- 1911/12–1912/13: Europeans

Career statistics
Competition	First-class
Matches	4
Runs scored	20
Batting average	3.33
100s/50s	–/–
Top score	7
Balls bowled	315
Wickets	7
Bowling average	18.71
5 wickets in innings	1
10 wickets in match	–
Best bowling	5/70
Catches/stumpings	4/–
- Source: Cricinfo, 20 November 2022

William Sydney Halliley MC (7 February 1888 — 6 September 1963) was an English first-class cricketer and an officer in both the British Army and British Indian Army.

Halliley was born in British Ceylon in February 1888 and was educated in England at Eastbourne College. From there he attended the Royal Military College, Sandhurst, graduating into the Royal Warwickshire Regiment as a second lieutenant in September 1908. He was promoted to lieutenant in April 1910, later resigning his commission in January 1913. While in British India, Halliley played first-class cricket for the Europeans cricket team on three occasions prior to the First World War, playing twice against the Parsees and once against the Muslims. He also made an additional first-class appearance for J. G. Greig's XI against the Hindus in 1912. Playing as a bowler, he took 7 wickets across his four first-class matches at an average of 18.71; he took one five wicket haul of 5 for 70 against the Parsees at Poona in August 1912.

Halliley returned to military service in the First World War, being commissioned into the Indian Army Reserve of Officers as a lieutenant in December 1914. He served with the 7th Rajput's and was awarded the Military Cross in October 1916. He was wounded in action in 1916, and taken a prisoner of war by the Ottoman Empire after the fall of Kut in April 1916. Toward the end of the war, he was promoted to captain in August 1918, antedated to September 1915. He was appointed to a regular Indian Army commission after the war, however retired from the Indian Army in August 1923. He later returned to service during the Second World War. Halliley died at Pembury in September 1963.
