= John Boyd (cricketer) =

English cricketer and soldier

Personal information
- Full name: John Hardy Boyd
- Born: 20 April 1899; Stockport, Cheshire, England
- Died: 7 December 1962 (aged 63); Salisbury, Wiltshire, England
- Batting: Unknown
- Bowling: Unknown

Domestic team information
- Years: Team
- 1921/22: Europeans

Career statistics
Competition	First-class
Matches	2
Runs scored	1
Batting average	1.00
100s/50s	–/–
Top score	1
Balls bowled	54
Wickets	0
Bowling average	–
5 wickets in innings	–
10 wickets in match	–
Best bowling	–
Catches/stumpings	3/–
- Source: Cricinfo, 17 December 2023

John Hardy Boyd OBE (20 April 1899 – 7 December 1962) was an English first-class cricketer and an officer in the British Army.

Boyd was born at Stockport in April 1899. He attended the Royal Military Academy at Woolwich, graduating from there during the latter stages of the First World War into the Royal Engineers as a second lieutenant. While serving in British India, Boyd made two appearances in first-class cricket for the Europeans cricket team against the Hindus and the Parsees at Bombay in the 1921–22 Bombay Quadrangular. He was appointed an adjutant in November 1926, by which point he held the rank of lieutenant. Promotion to captain followed in June 1929, prior to his appointment as an assistant instructor at the School of Anti-Aircraft Defence from October 1931 to January 1936. He was then appointed to be an instructor in searchlights with the 1st Anti-Aircraft Division in April 1936, with promotion to major following in June 1938.

Boyd served in the Second World War, during which he was promoted to lieutenant colonel in April 1944, with him also being made an OBE in March 1945 for gallant and distinguished service in the North-West Europe campaign of 1944–45. Following the war, he retired from active service in October 1949, at which point he was granted the honorary rank of brigadier. Boyd died at Salisbury in December 1962. To friends and colleagues in the Royal Engineers, he was better known as George Boyd.
