= Vivian Purcell =

English cricketer and soldier

Personal information
- Full name: Vivian Edward Purcell
- Born: 18 May 1882; Ipswich, Suffolk, England
- Died: 23 April 1954 (aged 71); Hove, Sussex, England
- Batting: Unknown

Domestic team information
- Years: Team
- 1911/12: Europeans

Career statistics
| Competition | First-class |
|---|---|
| Matches | 1 |
| Runs scored | 29 |
| Batting average | 29.00 |
| 100s/50s | –/– |
| Top score | 29* |
| Catches/stumpings | –/– |
- Source: Cricinfo, 8 December 2023

Vivian Edward Purcell (18 May 1882 – 23 April 1954) was an English first-class cricketer and an officer in the British Army.

The son of Colonel H. M. Purcell, he was born at Ipswich in May 1882. Purcell was educated at Wellington College, before attending the Royal Military Academy at Woolwich, from where he graduated into the Royal Engineers (RE) as a second lieutenant in July 1901. Promotion to lieutenant followed in April 1904, with a further promotion to captain coming in January 1912. While in serving in British India, Purcell made a single appearance in first-class cricket for the Europeans cricket team against the Parsees at Bombay in the 1911–12 Bombay Triangular Tournament. Batting twice in the match, he was dismissed without scoring by Maneksha Bulsara, while in their second innings he top-scored with an unbeaten 29 in the Europeans total of 85 all out.

Purcell served in the RE during the First World War, during which he gained promotion to major in November 1916. Eight years after the end of the war, he was placed on the half-pay list on account of ill-health, prior to retiring in October 1928. Purcell died at Hove in April 1954.
