= Patrick Williams (cricketer) =

English cricketer and British Army officer

Personal information
- Full name: Patrick Cyril Williams
- Born: 12 December 1912; Ningbo, Zhejiang, China
- Died: 9 December 1981 (aged 68); Helston, Cornwall, England
- Batting: Unknown
- Bowling: Unknown

Domestic team information
- Years: Team
- 1940/41: Europeans
- 1947: Wiltshire

Career statistics
Competition	First-class
Matches	1
Runs scored	14
Batting average	7.00
100s/50s	–/–
Top score	14
Balls bowled	172
Wickets	3
Bowling average	29.33
5 wickets in innings	1
10 wickets in match	–
Best bowling	3/88
Catches/stumpings	1/–
- Source: Cricinfo, 26 June 2019

Patrick Cyril Williams OBE (12 December 1912 – 9 December 1981) was both an English first-class cricketer and an officer in the British Army. Williams served in the Royal Corps of Signals from 1933 to 1964, during which time he was recognised for his contribution to the Malayan Emergency. He played first-class cricket while stationed in British India during the Second World War.

== Life and military career ==
Williams was born at Ningbo in the Republic of China in December 1912. He attended the Royal Military Academy, Woolwich in England, graduating in February 1933 and entering into the Royal Corps of Signals as a second lieutenant. He was promoted to the rank of lieutenant in February 1936. He served with the Royal Army Signal Corps during the Second World War, during which he was promoted to the rank of captain in February 1941. While stationed in British India in December 1940, Williams made a single appearance in first-class cricket for the Europeans against The Rest at Bombay. Batting twice in the match, he was dismissed for 14 runs in the Europeans first-innings by Grimley Richards, while in their second-innings he was dismissed without scoring by W. L. Mascarenhas. With the ball he took 3 wickets in The Rest's first-innings, taking figures of 3 for 88.

Just under a year after the conclusion of the war, he was promoted to the rank of major in July 1946. Williams played minor counties cricket for Wiltshire upon his return from duty, making a single appearance in the 1947 Minor Counties Championship. He was promoted to the rank of lieutenant colonel in April 1954. He was made an OBE in December 1957, in recognition of his service during the Malayan Emergency. He was promoted to the rank of colonel in November 1985. He retired from active service in July 1964. He died in December 1981 at Helston.
