= Edmund Saulez =

Irish cricketer and British Indian Army officer

Personal information
- Full name: Edmund Harrison Saulez
- Born: 23 February 1867; Seapoint, Ireland
- Died: 19 November 1948 (aged 81); Havant, Hampshire, England
- Batting: Unknown

Domestic team information
- Years: Team
- 1894/95: Europeans (India)

Career statistics
Competition	First-class
Matches	2
Runs scored	5
Batting average	1.66
100s/50s	–/–
Top score	5
Catches/stumpings	2/–
- Source: ESPNcricinfo, 1 December 2018

Edmund Harrison Saulez (23 February 1867 – 19 November 1948) was an Irish first-class cricketer and British Indian Army officer.

Saulez was born at Seapoint near Dublin. He later attended Queen's College, Oxford. After graduating from Queen's College, he joined the British Army as a second lieutenant in the Suffolk Regiment. He was gazetted lieutenant in April 1890. In August and September 1894, he featured in two first-class cricket matches for the Europeans against the Parsees at Bombay and Poona. He later gained the rank of captain in November 1898, followed by promotion to major in December 1905. He retired from the British Indian Army in 1912. He spent his final years living in Havant, Hampshire where he died in November 1948.
