= Samuel Powell (cricketer) =

English cricketer and soldier

Personal information
- Full name: Samuel Norman Powell
- Born: after 18 March 1878; Chelsea, Middlesex, England
- Died: 18 March 1931 (aged 53) at sea aboard the SS Margha, off the coast of Jersey
- Batting: Unknown
- Bowling: Unknown

Domestic team information
- Years: Team
- 1905/06–1907/08: Europeans

Umpiring information
- FC umpired: 1 (1907)

Career statistics
Competition	First-class
Matches	3
Runs scored	49
Batting average	9.80
100s/50s	–/–
Top score	32
Balls bowled	120
Wickets	1
Bowling average	64.00
5 wickets in innings	–
10 wickets in match	–
Best bowling	1/60
Catches/stumpings	1/–
- Source: Cricinfo, 12 November 2023

Samuel Norman Powell (after March 1878 – 18 March 1931) was an English first-class cricketer and umpire.

Powell was born in 1878 at Chelsea. He was employed in British India in a paper manufacturing business in Calcutta. He played first-class cricket in India for the Europeans cricket team, making his debut against the Parsees in the 1905–06 Bombay Presidency Match. Two further appearances followed against the same opposition in the 1907–08 Bombay Triangular and Bombay Presidency matches. In his three first-class matches, he scored 49 runs with a highest score of 32, in addition to taking a single wicket. He also stood as umpire in a first-class fixture between the Europeans and the Hindus in the 1906–07 Bombay Presidency Match. In June 1911, he undertook divorce proceedings against his wife, for her infidelity with his principal assistant Wilfred Kenyon Haley. Proceedings ended with Powell securing custody of his three children. Whilst returning home on the SS Margha in March 1931, Powell died suddenly aboard when the ship was off the coast of Jersey. Having remarried, his wife came to meet him at Plymouth, only to discover Powell's death; only days previously, he had written to her from Marseille informing her he was on his way home from India.
