= Francis Travers =

English cricketer

Personal information
- Full name: Francis Guy Travers
- Born: 7 November 1882; Birkenhead, Cheshire, England
- Died: 5 July 1950 (aged 67); Kensington, London, England
- Batting: Unknown
- Bowling: Unknown

Domestic team information
- Years: Team
- 1911: Cheshire
- 1920/21–1928/29: Europeans
- 1926/27: Bombay

Career statistics
Competition	First-class
Matches	17
Runs scored	835
Batting average	33.40
100s/50s	2/2
Top score	121*
Balls bowled	759
Wickets	6
Bowling average	67.16
5 wickets in innings	–
10 wickets in match	–
Best bowling	2/23
Catches/stumpings	28/–
- Source: ESPNcricinfo, 28 February 2019

Francis Guy Travers (7 November 1882 – 5 July 1950) was an English first-class cricketer.

Travers was born at Birkenhead. He played minor counties cricket for Cheshire from 1911, making a single appearance in the Minor Counties Championship against Staffordshire. He later lived in British India, where he served as a lieutenant with the Scind Rifles, part of the Indian Defence Force. While in British India, Travers made his debut in first-class cricket for the Europeans against the Parsees at Bombay in the 1921/22 Bombay Quadrangular. He played regularly for the Europeans during the 1920s, making fourteen appearances for them in first-class cricket. He also played two first-class matches for the combined Europeans and Parsees cricket team. The first of these came against the combined Hindus and Muslims cricket team in November 1922, while the second came against the Marylebone Cricket Club (MCC) in December 1926; in that same month he also played for Bombay against the MCC. Making seventeen appearances in first-class cricket while in British India, Travers scored 835 runs at an average of 33.40, with a high score of 121 not out. One of two centuries he made in first-class cricket, this score came against the Muslims in November 1925. He was also a competent fielding, taking 28 catches.

He married Emma Herman prior to 1917, with the couple having one daughter. He returned to England at somepoint after 1928, where he died at Kensington in July 1950.
