= Ernest Shattock =

English cricketer

Personal information
- Full name: Ernest Keith Shattock
- Born: 7 April 1887; Wandsworth, Surrey, England
- Died: 1 May 1962 (aged 75); Berkhamsted, Hertfordshire, England
- Batting: Unknown
- Role: Wicket-keeper

Domestic team information
- Years: Team
- 1915/16–1926/27: Europeans

Career statistics
Competition	First-class
Matches	11
Runs scored	321
Batting average	16.05
100s/50s	–/2
Top score	74
Catches/stumpings	8/7
- Source: ESPNcricinfo, 18 November 2022

Ernest Keith Shattock (7 April 1887 – 1 May 1962) was an English first-class cricketer.

The son of Arthur Foster Shattock, he was born at Wandsworth in April 1887 and was educated at Dulwich College. Travelling to British India, Shattock served in the British India Army Reserve with the 7th Hariana Lancers during the First World War, gaining the rank of second lieutenant in July 1918. In India, Shattock played first-class cricket for the Europeans cricket team on eleven occasions in the Madras Presidency Matches between 1915 and 1927. Playing as a wicket-keeper in the Europeans team, he scored 321 runs at an average of 16.05; he made two half centuries, with a highest score of 74. Behind the stumps he took 8 catches and made 7 stumpings. A resident in Madras, Shattock was employed as an assistant for the merchants Best and Co Ltd, Madras. Retiring to England, he died at Berkhamsted in May 1962. He was married to Elsa Maria Sanders, with the couple having one son.
