= Alexander Penfold =

English cricketer

Alexander George Penfold (14 May 1901 – 28 September 1982) was an English first-class cricketer active 1924–30 who played for Surrey. He was born in Kenley; died in Isfield.
