= Kenneth Goldie =

English cricketer

Kenneth Oswald Goldie (19 September 1882 – 14 January 1938) was an English cricketer active from 1900 to 1921 who played for Sussex and London County Cricket Club. He was born in Burma and died in Madras. He appeared in 86 first-class matches as a righthanded batsman who bowled right arm fast. He scored 3,114 runs with a highest score of 140 and took 65 wickets with a best performance of five for 80. An occasional wicketkeeper, he completed 89 catches and two stumpings.
