= Indians cricket team =

The Indians cricket team was an Indian first-class cricket team which took part in the annual Madras Presidency Matches against the Europeans cricket team, commencing in December 1915.

== Sources ==
- Vasant Raiji, India's Hambledon Men, Tyeby Press, 1986
- Mihir Bose, A History of Indian Cricket, Andre-Deutsch, 1990
- Ramachandra Guha, A Corner of a Foreign Field - An Indian History of a British Sport, Picador, 2001
