= Croome =

Croome may refer to:

== Places ==
- Croome, East Riding of Yorkshire, hamlet in the East Riding of Yorkshire, England
- Croome Court, an 18th century mansion at Croome D'Abitot, Worcestershire, England
- Croome D'Abitot, a village in Worcestershire, England
- Earl's Croome, a village in Worcestershire, England
- Hill Croome, a village and parish in Worcestershire, England

== People ==
- Arthur Croome (1866–1930), English cricketer
- Beric John Croome (1960–2019), South African lawyer and chartered accountant
- Helen Elizabeth Croome (born 1983), known as Gossling, Australian singer-songwriter
- Honor Croome (1908–1960), English writer
- Judy Croome (born 1958), Zimbabwe-born South African writer
- Randolph George Croome (1884–1956), Canadian railway conductor and politician
- Rodney Croome, Australian LGBT rights activist and academic
- Victor Croome (1899–1973), English cricketer
- William Croome (1790–1860), American illustrator and wood engraver
- William Iveson Croome (1891–1967), British archaeologist

== See also ==
- Croome collection, the archive of the Earls of Coventry
- HMS Croome, including
  - HMS Croome (L62), a Royal Navy ship
- Croom (disambiguation)
