= Richard Wodehouse =

English cricketer

Personal information
- Full name: Richard Lancelot Deane Wodehouse
- Born: 30 May 1892; Chippenham, Wiltshire, England
- Died: 20 May 1940 (aged 47); Cookham, Berkshire, England

Domestic team information
- Years: Team
- 1923–1924: Europeans (India)
- First-class debut: 3 December 1923 Europeans (India) v Parsees
- Last First-class: 1 December 1924 Europeans (India) v Hindus

Career statistics
Competition	First-class
Matches	3
Runs scored	84
Batting average	14.00
100s/50s	0/1
Top score	52
Balls bowled	298
Wickets	5
Bowling average	27.60
5 wickets in innings	0
10 wickets in match	0
Best bowling	2/25
Catches/stumpings	3/0
- Source: CricketArchive, 13 December 2007

Richard Lancelot Deane Wodehouse (30 May 1892 – 20 May 1940) was an English cricketer. Born in Chippenham, Wiltshire, his entire recorded cricket career took place in Asia. The youngest of four brothers, one of his older three brothers was the author P. G. Wodehouse. He was younger than any of his brothers by 11 years, and according to P.G. Wodehouse's biographer, "Dick" (as he was known to the family) did not spend significant time with his siblings at any point in their lives. Though he was born in and died in England, he lived most of his life in India and then China.

Wodehouse died in Cookham, Berkshire, in 1940, leaving a widow, Winifred Baker Wodehouse, and property valued at £1,920. His address at death was given as Woodlands, Cookham Dean.

== Career ==
In April 1919, Wodehouse made his debut for the Straits Settlements, playing against the Federated Malay States in Singapore. The following year, he played twice for Hong Kong; against Malaya and a combined Shanghai/Malaya team.

He returned to play two more matches for the Straits Settlements against the Federated Malay States in 1922 and 1923, before playing three first-class matches in the Bombay Quadrangular tournament in India for the Europeans.
