= Edward Barrett =

Edward Barrett may refer to:

- Edward Barrett, 1st Lord Barrett of Newburgh (1581–1645), English politician
- Edward Barrett (cricketer, born 1855) (1855–1922), English cricketer and brewer
- Edward Barrett (Medal of Honor) (1855–?), second class fireman serving in the United States Navy who received the Medal of Honor for bravery
- Edward Barrett (Irish sportsman) (1877–1932), track and field athlete, wrestler and hurler
- Edward Barrett (English sportsman) (1879–1950), English cricketer and rugby union international, soldier and Commissioner of Shanghai Municipal Police
- Edward J. Barrett (politician) (1900–1977), American politician in Illinois
- Edward W. Barrett (1910–1989), dean of Columbia School of Journalism
- Edward J. Barrett (born 1943), United States Coast Guard admiral
- Edward Gabriel André Barrett (1827–1880), United States Navy officer
- Edward Barrett (slave), former slave in the United States
- Ted Barrett (born 1965), baseball umpire
- Edward E. Barrett, a 19th-century pilot boat

== See also ==
- Edward Barrett-Lennard (1799–1878), English settler of Western Australia
- Ted Barratt (1844–1891), English cricketer
