= John Healing =

English cricketer

Personal information
- Full name: John Alfred Healing
- Born: 14 June 1873; Forthampton, Gloucestershire, England
- Died: 4 July 1933 (aged 60); Caister-on-Sea, Norfolk, England
- Batting: Left-handed
- Relatives: Percival Healing (brother)

Domestic team information
- Years: Team
- 1894: Cambridge University
- 1899–1906: Gloucestershire
- FC debut: 17 May 1894 Cambridge University v AJ Webbe's XI
- Last FC: 14 June 1906 Gloucestershire v Somerset

Career statistics
Competition	First-class
Matches	12
Runs scored	195
Batting average	9.75
100s/50s	0/0
Top score	37
Catches/stumpings	10/–
- Source: CricketArchive, 4 December 2007

John Alfred Healing (14 June 1873 – 4 July 1933) was an English cricketer. A left-handed batsman, he played first-class cricket for Gloucestershire County Cricket Club between 1899 and 1906.

== Career ==
Born at Forthampton near Tewkesbury in 1873, Healing was educated at Clifton College and Pembroke College, Cambridge. He made his first-class debut for Cambridge University in May 1894, playing against AJ Webbe's XI and Yorkshire. He played a match for Gloucestershire against Dublin University the following month, and played for the Straits Settlements against Hong Kong and Shanghai in November 1897.

He returned to play in England, playing sporadically for Gloucestershire between 1899 and 1906. In 1899, he played two County Championship matches against Nottinghamshire and Warwickshire, followed by five more county championship matches in 1901, his busiest season. He played against South Africa in 1904, and played his final two first-class matches, against Cambridge University and Somerset in June 1906.

Healing saved in the British Army during World War I. He was awarded the Military Cross in 1917. He was a member of the London Stock Exchange. He died at Caister-on-Sea in Norfolk in 1933 aged 60.
