= Financial secretary =

Financial secretary is an administrative and executive government position within the governance of a state, corporation, private or public organization, small group or other body with financial assets.

A financial secretary oversees policy concerning the flow of financial resources like money in and out of an organization. The officer sometimes determines policy concerning the purchase or sale of goods and services, collection of dues and employment. The officer implements policy with the cooperation of other executives.

== Use in British colonies and dependencies ==
The term financial secretary may refer to a cabinet member (often serving ex officio) in various former and present British dependencies, holding responsibilities similar to those of a finance minister. Held by civil servants, the title continues to be used in jurisdictions such as Hong Kong even after the handover to China, as well as in Montserrat and Saint Helena. It was formerly used in Singapore (for instance, Thomas Hart served as Singapore's final financial secretary from 1954 to 1959) and in Jamaica.

In the United Kingdom, the Financial Secretary to the Treasury is a junior ministerial position, although the office holder typically attends cabinet meetings. In some municipal and state government contexts, a financial secretary may be an appointed or elected official responsible for public financial administration.
