= John Dunn (cricketer) =

English cricketer (1862–1892)

Personal information
- Born: 8 June 1862; Hobart, Tasmania, Australia
- Died: 10 October 1892 (aged 30); Pescadores, Formosa
- Batting: Right-handed
- Role: Batsman

Domestic team information
- Years: Team
- 1881: Surrey
- 1882: MCC

Career statistics
Competition	First-class
Matches	7
Runs scored	95
Batting average	8.63
100s/50s	0/0
Top score	38*
Catches/stumpings	1/0
- Source: CricketArchive, 14 October 2021

John Dunn (8 June 1862 – 10 October 1892) was an English first-class cricketer who played with Surrey and the Marylebone Cricket Club (MCC). He also played cricket for Hong Kong later in his career.

Dunn was educated at Harrow School and played his cricket as an amateur. A right-handed batsman, he made four first-class appearances for Surrey in 1881 and two for the MCC the following year. Although he was used as a specialist batsman he struggled in his matches, except for an innings of 38 not out which he made when playing with Surrey against Kent at Mote Park. His only other first-class match was for the Gentlemen of England, whom he represented against I Zingari in 1889.

After serving as a cadet at the Royal Military College at Sandhurst, Dunn joined the Liverpool Regiment in 1882 and was promoted to the rank of captain seven years later. In 1889 he was posted to Hong Kong with the Army Service Corps and began playing cricket for the UK territory.

He represented the Hong Kong cricket team in Interport matches, during 1891 and 1892. In a match against Shanghai which Hong Kong hosted, Dunn scored 107 to help his team win by an innings and 123 runs. Later that year in October, Hong Kong played an away match against Shanghai and travelled home on the SS Bokhara, which sank in a typhoon off the coast of Formosa. Dunn was killed along with ten of his teammates.
