= Robert Braddell =

English cricketer

Personal information
- Full name: Robert Lyttleton Lee Braddell
- Born: 14 December 1888; Malacca, Straits Settlements
- Died: 17 March 1965 (aged 76); Sintra, Portugal
- Batting: Right-handed
- Bowling: Right-arm medium pace

Domestic team information
- Years: Team
- 1926: HDG Leveson-Gower's XI
- 1919: Gentlemen of England
- 1909-1911: Marylebone Cricket Club (MCC)
- 1908-1911: Oxford University
- First-class debut: 14 May 1908 Oxford University v Lancashire
- Last First-class: 19 May 1926 HDG Leveson-Gower's XI v Oxford University

Career statistics
Competition	First-class
Matches	20
Runs scored	650
Batting average	18.57
100s/50s	0/3
Top score	96
Balls bowled	425
Wickets	11
Bowling average	22.45
5 wickets in innings	0
10 wickets in match	0
Best bowling	2/1
Catches/stumpings	11/0
- Source: CricketArchive, 9 December 2007

Robert Lyttleton Lee Braddell (14 December 1888 – 17 March 1965) was an English cricketer. A right-handed batsman and right-arm medium pace bowler, he played 20 first-class cricket matches, mostly for Oxford University.

== Career ==
Braddell was educated at Charterhouse and Oriel College, Oxford. In May 1908 he made his first-class debut for the University cricket team, playing against Lancashire. His second first-class match the following year was against the university team, playing for the Marylebone Cricket Club (MCC). He also played for the university against Worcestershire the same year. In addition he played minor counties cricket for Suffolk during those two years.

In 1910, he played seven first-class matches for Oxford University, gaining his blue when he played against Cambridge University in July. He played seven more first-class matches for them the following year, including a game against India, also playing a second match for the MCC against Yorkshire that August. His highest score was 96 against Kent.

Bradell studied law and was called to the bar at the Inner Temple in 1911. He then moved to Singapore and was admitted to the local Bar in 1912. In that year he played his first match for the Straits Settlements, playing against the Federated Malay States in Singapore in April. However, he returned to England in the First World War and was commissioned in the Royal Garrison Artillery. After the war he played a first-class match for the Gentlemen of England against Oxford University in 1919, and for HDG Leveson-Gower's XI against the same opposition in 1926, fitting in a second match for the Straits Settlements against the Federated Malay States in 1923.

The remainder of his cricket career was spent in the Far East, playing for the Straits Settlements between 1927 and 1930, also playing for the combined Malaya cricket team against Hong Kong and Shanghai. He also played for Singapore in 1927.
