= Charles Congdon (cricketer) =

English cricketer

Personal information
- Full name: Charles Hector Congdon
- Born: 29 August 1891; Ireland Island, Sandys Parish, Bermuda
- Died: 11 January 1958 (aged 66); Boughton Street, Kent, England
- Batting: Right-handed
- Bowling: Not known
- Role: Batsman

Domestic team information
- Years: Team
- 1921–1929: Royal Navy
- First-class debut: 24 June 1921 Royal Navy v Army
- Last First-class: 31 July 1929 Royal Navy v Royal Air Force

Career statistics
Competition	First-class
Matches	9
Runs scored	652
Batting average	38.35
100s/50s	2/3
Top score	128
Balls bowled	84
Wickets	3
Bowling average	25.00
5 wickets in innings	0
10 wickets in match	0
Best bowling	2/11
Catches/stumpings	4/0
- Source: CricketArchive, 15 December 2007

Charles Hector Congdon (29 August 1891 in Ireland Island, Sandys Parish, Bermuda – 11 January 1958 in Boughton Street, Kent, England) was an English cricketer. A right-handed batsman, he played nine first-class matches for the Royal Navy between 1921 and 1929.

== Career ==
Charles Congdon made his first-class debut for the Royal Navy at Lord's in June 1921 against the Army. He played in the fixture again in 1922, 1923 and 1925. In 1926, he played for the Straits Settlements against the Federated Malay States, playing again in the fixture the following year, a year in which he also played for Malaya against Shanghai and Hong Kong.

Back in England, he played two first-class matches for the Royal Navy against the Army and the RAF in 1928, and played against those two teams and the Marylebone Cricket Club (MCC) in 1929. He played for the MCC against Ireland in Dublin in 1932.
