= Phayre =

Phayre is a surname. Notable people with the surname include:

- Arthur Purves Phayre (1812–1885), British Indian Army officer
- Robert Phayre (regicide), one of the three officers to whom the warrant for the execution of Charles I was addressed
- Robert Phayre (Indian Army officer) (1820–1897)
- Robert Phayre (cricketer) (1901–1993), British soldier and cricketer

== See also ==
- Phayer
