= Ernest Coxon =

English cricketer

Personal information
- Full name: Ernest James de Veuille Coxon
- Born: 10 December 1857; Bishop's Hull, Somerset, England
- Died: 8 April 1924 (aged 66); Neuilly-sur-Seine, Hauts-de-Seine, France
- Batting: Left-handed
- Bowling: Left-arm medium

Career statistics
Competition	First-class
Matches	1
Runs scored	31
Batting average	15.50
100s/50s	–/–
Top score	21
Balls bowled	15
Wickets	0
Bowling average	–
5 wickets in innings	–
10 wickets in match	–
Best bowling	–
Catches/stumpings	2/–
- Source: Cricinfo, 22 June 2019

Ernest James de Veuille Coxon (10 December 1857 – 8 April 1924) was an English first-class cricketer.

Coxon was born in December 1857 at Bishop's Hull, Somerset. He played minor matches for Hong Kong, playing in the interport matches against Shanghai and the Straits Settlements in October 1889 and January 1890. He returned to England shortly thereafter, where he made a single first-class appearance for the Gentlemen of England against Oxford University at Oxford in 1890. Batting twice in the match, he was dismissed in the Gentlemen of England's first-innings for 10 runs by Lionel Palairet, while in their second-innings he was dismissed for 21 runs by Percy Farrant. Having played for Hong Kong in the interport match against Shanghai in February 1892, he was unable to fulfil the return October fixture in Shanghai. His unavailability likely saved his life, as the SS Bokhara transporting the Hong Kong team to Shanghai sunk, resulting in the deaths of all but two members of the Hong Kong team. Coxon later died in France at Neuilly-sur-Seine in April 1924.
