= William Smith (cricketer, born 1902) =

Scottish cricketer

Personal information
- Full name: William Alexander Bremner Smith
- Born: 22 July 1902; Greenock, Renfrewshire, Scotland
- Died: 21 December 1937 (aged 35); Kuala Lumpur, Federated Malay States
- Batting: Right-handed
- Bowling: Right-arm fast-medium

Domestic team information
- Years: Team
- 1927: Scotland
- Source: CricketArchive, 4 January 2008

William Alexander Bremner Smith (22 July 1902 – 21 December 1937) was a Scottish cricketer. A right-handed batsman and right-arm fast-medium bowler, he played once for the Scotland national cricket team in 1927.

== Biography ==
Born in Greenock in 1902, he played club cricket for Greenock Cricket Club, taking 268 wickets at an average of 13.55. His first match against international opposition came for the West of Scotland Cricket Club against Australia in 1926. He played his only match for Scotland the following year, a first-class match against Ireland.

Soon after this, he moved to the Federated Malay States, and played twice for Malaya against Shanghai and Hong Kong in 1929. He played a match for the Federated Malay States against the Straits Settlements the following year, and played in the fixture a second time in 1934. He died in Kuala Lumpur in 1937.
