= Henry Nicoll (cricketer) =

Scottish cricketer

Personal information
- Full name: Henry Russell Nicoll
- Born: 27 February 1883; Mains, Angus, Scotland
- Died: 25 September 1948 (aged 65); Dundee, Scotland

Domestic team information
- Years: Team
- 1914: Scotland
- Source: CricketArchive, 31 December 2007

Henry Russell Nicoll (1883–1948) was a Scottish cricketer.

== Biography ==
Born in Angus on 27 February 1883 and educated at the Morgan Academy, Nicoll played once for the Scotland national cricket team, a first-class match against Ireland in July 1914. He took 7/64 in the second innings of the match.

In April 1919, he played for the Federated Malay States against the Straits Settlements in Singapore alongside fellow Scottish international William Cockburn. He died in Dundee on 25 September 1948.
