= Philip Stewart-Brown =

English cricketer

Personal information
- Full name: Philip Harman Stewart-Brown
- Born: 30 April 1904; Bromborough, Cheshire, England
- Died: 21 December 1960 (aged 56); London, England
- Batting: Right-handed
- Role: Batsman, occasional wicket-keeper

Domestic team information
- Years: Team
- 1927: HDG Leveson-Gower's XI
- 1927: Harlequins
- 1924-1926: Oxford University
- First-class debut: 7 May 1924 Oxford University v Lancashire
- Last First-class: 25 June 1927 HDG Leveson-Gower's XI v Oxford University

Career statistics
Competition	First-class
Matches	17
Runs scored	845
Batting average	28.16
100s/50s	0/5
Top score	99
Balls bowled	0
Wickets	-
Bowling average	-
5 wickets in innings	-
10 wickets in match	-
Best bowling	-
Catches/stumpings	9/0
- Source: CricketArchive, 15 December 2007

Philip Harman Stewart-Brown (30 April 1904 – 21 December 1960) was an English cricketer. A right-handed batsman and occasional wicket-keeper, he played first-class cricket between 1924 and 1927, mostly for Oxford University.

== Cricket career ==
Stewart-Brown made his first-class debut for Oxford University against Lancashire in May 1924. He also played against Kent the same month. He played six first-class matches for them the following year, gaining his blue when he played against Cambridge University at Lord's in July.

In 1926, he played his final seven first-class matches for Oxford University, including matches against Australia and Ireland. The following year, he played two first-class matches against Oxford University, for Harlequins and for HDG Leveson-Gower's XI. He later played four matches for the Straits Settlements against the Federated Malay States between 1928 and 1937.

Writing about Stewart-Brown's batting in 1926, Dudley Carew said he "never looks anything but graceful and debonair. He is splendidly firm on his feet, and, when he drives fast bowling, there is an admirable lack of effort or excitement about his stroke."

== Personal life ==
Stewart-Brown was educated at Harrow School before going up to Oriel College, Oxford. He served in the Second World War, gaining the rank of temporary major in the Royal Marines.

He married Mavis Tottenham in 1944. They had no children.
