= Arthur Perkins =

Arthur Perkins may refer to:

- Bertie Perkins (Arthur Lionel Bertie Perkins, 1905–1992), English cricketer
- Arthur Perkins (judge) (1864–1932), American lawyer and judge from Hartford, Connecticut
