= Ernest Dynes =

English cricketer and British Army officer (1903–1968)

Personal information
- Full name: Ernest Desmond Dynes
- Born: 30 March 1903; Bedford, England
- Died: 21 June 1968 (aged 65); Ipswich, Suffolk, England
- Batting: Right-handed
- Bowling: Leg spin

Domestic team information
- Years: Team
- 1928-1930: Minor Counties
- 1929-1931: Army
- FC debut: 16 June 1928 Minor Counties v West Indies
- Last FC: 15 August 1931 Army v MCC

Career statistics
Competition	First-class
Matches	9
Runs scored	410
Batting average	27.33
100s/50s	1/1
Top score	127
Balls bowled	1178
Wickets	34
Bowling average	15.02
5 wickets in innings	2
10 wickets in match	0
Best bowling	5/31
Catches/stumpings	7/–
- Source: CricketArchive, 26 December 2007

Ernest Desmond Dynes CBE (30 March 1903 – 21 June 1968) was an English cricketer in the 1920s and 1930s and later a Brigadier in the British Army and an Aide-de-Camp to Queen Elizabeth II.

A right-handed batsman and leg spin bowler, he played first-class cricket between 1928 and 1931.

== Biography ==
Born in Bedford in 1903, Ernest Dynes was educated at Bedford Modern School and the Royal Military College, Sandhurst. He began playing for his native Bedfordshire in the Minor Counties Championship in 1921. In 1924, he was selected for a combined Minor Counties North team to play against a combined Minor Counties South team.

He made his first-class debut for the combined Minor Counties team in June 1928, playing against the West Indies. The following year, he played for the Minor Counties against South Africa, and for the Army against the Royal Air Force and the Royal Navy. He scored 127 against the Royal Navy, his only first-class century.

In 1930, he played his last first-class match for the Minor Counties, against Wales, against whom he took 5/64, the only time he took five wickets in an innings in first-class cricket, and played for the Army against the Royal Air Force and the Marylebone Cricket Club (MCC). He played his last first-class matches in 1931, playing for the Army against the Royal Air Force and the MCC.

He carried on playing for Bedfordshire until 1938 and played twice for the Straits Settlements against the Federated Malay States in 1938 and 1940. He also played rugby for Bedford.

Later in life, he served as Aide-de-camp to Queen Elizabeth II between 1955 and 1957, for which he was awarded the CBE. He also served as honorary secretary of the Sussex County Golf Union. He died in 1968.
