= List of people from Cranbrook, Kent =

This is a list of people from Cranbrook, Kent, England.

== Born in Cranbrook ==
- William Addison (1883–1962), Army chaplain and Victoria Cross recipient
- John Boorman (c.1754–1807), cricketer
- Douglas Carr (1872–1950), cricketer.
- Jon Cleary (born 1962), musician.
- Nathaniel Courthope (1585–c.1620), merchant mariner.
- Phineas Fletcher (1582–1620), poet.
- William Huntington (1745–1813), preacher.
- Douglas Jerrold (1803–57), dramatist.
- John Neve (1902–76), cricketer.
- William Neve (1852–1942), architect.
- Arthur Tooth (1839–1931), priest.
- Peter West (1902–2003), sports commentator.^{†}

== Old Cranbrookians ==
These people attended Cranbrook School.

- John Akehurst (1930–2007), soldier.
- Antony Atkinson (born 19??), economist.
- John Barraclough (1918–2008), RAF officer.
- Emma Biggs (born 1956), artist
- Hugo Burnham (born 1956), musician
- John Collins (1905–1982), clergyman
- Barry Davies (born c.1937), sports commentator.
- Phil Edmonds (born 1951), cricketer.
- Harry Hill (born 1964), comedian and television presenter.
- Victor Horsley (1857–1916), scientist.
- Norman Hulbert (1903–1972), RAF officer and MP.
- Arthur Surridge Hunt (1871–1934), papyrologist.
- Hammond Innes (1913–1998), novelist.
- Kevin Lygo (born 19??), television executive.
- Richard Middleton (1882–1911), poet.
- Brian Moore (born 1932), sports commentator.
- Richard Pilbrow (born 1933), producer.
- Piers Sellers (born 1955), astronaut.
- Tim Smit (born 1954), businessman.
- Charles Wheeler (1923–2008), journalist and presenter.
- Wallace Wright (1875–1953), soldier and MP. Victoria Cross recipient.
- Rob Casserley (born 1975), doctor, 8 time Everest summiteer

== People connected with Cranbrook ==
These people have a connection with Cranbrook

- Robert Abbot (1558?–1662?), theologian, was vicar of Cranbrook 1616–43
- Dudley Fenner (c 1558–1587), puritan.
- Frederick Hardy (1827–1911), artist, was a member of the Cranbrook Colony of artists.
- Chris Langham, (born 1949), writer, actor and comedian, lives in Cranbrook.
- Douglas Lowe (1902–81) Olympic athlete and JP was residing in Cranbrook at the time of his death.

== Notes ==
† Also Old Cranbrookian.
