= Victor Croome =

English cricketer

Personal information
- Born: 30 November 1899; Westminster, London, England
- Died: 1 September 1973 (aged 73); Thaxted, Essex, England
- Batting: Right-handed
- Role: Wicket-keeper

Domestic team information
- Years: Team
- 1928–1930: Royal Air Force
- FC debut: 13 June 1928 RAF v Army
- Last FC: 5 July 1930 RAF v Army

Career statistics
Competition	First-class
Matches	5
Runs scored	124
Batting average	17.71
100s/50s	0/0
Top score	36
Catches/stumpings	6/4
- Source: CricketArchive, 19 December 2007

Victor Croome (30 November 1899 – 1 September 1973) was an English cricketer. A right-handed batsman and occasional wicket-keeper, he played first-class cricket for the Royal Air Force between 1928 and 1930.

== Biography ==
Born in Westminster, London in 1899, the son of Gloucestershire player Arthur Croome, Victor made his first-class debut for the RAF against the Army in 1928. He also played against the Royal Navy the same year. He played against the same opponents in 1929.

After a final match for the RAF against the Army in 1930, the remainder of his recorded cricket career took place in the Far East. He played for the Straits Settlements against the Federated Malay States in 1932 and 1933, and for Malaya against Hong Kong and Shanghai in Hong Kong in 1933. He died in Essex in 1973.
