= Norman Grenier =

New Zealand cricketer

Norman E Grenier (birth and death details unknown) was a cricketer from Malaya who played a single first-class match for Auckland in 1913.

From late 1912 until February 1913 Grenier took an extended holiday in New Zealand from his home in Malaya. An opening batsman, he captained the Parnell club in the Auckland competition for the season. After a slow start, by mid-season he had become one of the leading batsmen in the competition, and made some good scores in other non-first-class matches. He was selected to play for Auckland against Canterbury in a Plunket Shield match in January, but he was not successful, scoring 9 and 14, and Canterbury won easily. He returned home to Malaya late in the season on the SS Maheno.

Grenier was a regular player for the Federated Malay States cricket team in its annual match against the Straits Settlements cricket team between 1905 and 1929. He worked in the civil service in Malaya until his retirement in 1934. He married a New Zealander, Miss A. Gillet, a teacher at the Victoria Institution in Kuala Lumpur.
