= Percival Penman =

Australian sportsman (1885–1944)

Personal information
- Full name: Arthur Percival Penman
- Born: 23 January 1885; Ultimo, New South Wales, Australia
- Died: 11 September 1944 (aged 59); Wahroonga, New South Wales, Australia
- Batting: Right-handed
- Bowling: Right-arm fast
- Role: Bowler

Domestic team information
- Years: Team
- 1904/05–1905/06: New South Wales
- FC debut: 24 December 1904 New South Wales v Queensland
- Last FC: 12 January 1906 New South Wales v Australian XI

Career statistics
Competition	First-class
Matches	5
Runs scored	45
Batting average	15.00
100s/50s	0/0
Top score	15*
Balls bowled	819
Wickets	18
Bowling average	21.94
5 wickets in innings	1
10 wickets in match	0
Best bowling	5/48
Catches/stumpings	0/–
- Source: CricketArchive, 1 January 2008

Percival Penman
Rugby union career
- Position: fullback
International career
Years	Team	Apps	(Points)
1905	Australia	1	(0)

Arthur Percival Penman (23 January 1885 – 11 September 1944) was an Australian cricketer and Australian rugby union representative. A right-handed batsman and right-arm fast bowler, he played first-class cricket for New South Wales in the early 20th century.

== Cricket career ==
Born in New South Wales on 23 January 1885, Penman first played for the New South Wales cricket team in December 1904 in a first-class match against Queensland. He played further matches for New South Wales against Tasmania and Queensland in the same season. The following season he played his last two first-class matches against Queensland and an Australian XI. He never played a match in the Sheffield Shield.

In the mid-1920s, Penman played three matches for the Federated Malay States, two against the Straits Settlements and one against Hong Kong. He died in New South Wales on 11 September 1944.

== Rugby union career ==
Penman was also a rugby union international for Australia, being capped for his country as a fullback in a friendly against New Zealand, at Dunedin, on 2 September 1905.
