= Reginald Thoy =

English cricketer

Personal information
- Full name: Reginald Ernest Thoy
- Born: 12 May 1921; Singapore
- Died: 2 December 1993 (aged 72); Maidstone, Kent, England
- Batting: Right-handed

Domestic team information
- Years: Team
- 1955–1957: DR Jardine's XI
- FC debut: 29 June 1955 DR Jardine's XI v Oxford University
- Last FC: 3 July 1957 DR Jardine's XI v Oxford University

Career statistics
| Competition | First-class |
|---|---|
| Matches | 2 |
| Runs scored | 24 |
| Batting average | 8.00 |
| 100s/50s | 0/0 |
| Top score | 13 |
| Catches/stumpings | 3/0 |
- Source: CricketArchive, 29 December 2007

Reginald Ernest Thoy (12 May 1921 – 2 December 1993) was an English cricketer. A right-handed batsman, he played two first-class matches in the 1950s.

== Biography ==
Born in Singapore in 1921, Thoy's first recorded cricket was two matches for the Straits Settlements against the Federated Malay States in 1939 and 1940.

In England after the war, he played a Minor Counties Championship match for the Kent Second XI against the Surrey Second XI in 1948, though he never played for the first team. He later played two first-class matches for DR Jardine's XI against Oxford University in 1955 and 1957.

He died in Maidstone, Kent in 1993, though his obituary in the Wisden Cricketers' Almanack incorrectly gives his year of death as 1994.
