= John Mayhew (cricketer) =

English cricketer

Personal information
- Full name: John Francis Nicholas Mayhew
- Born: 6 December 1909; India
- Died: 31 January 1999 (aged 89); Brandon, Manitoba, Canada
- Batting: Right-handed
- Role: Wicket-keeper

Domestic team information
- Years: Team
- 1929–1931: Oxford University
- First-class debut: 15 June 1929 Oxford University v Derbyshire
- Last First-class: 9 May 1931 Oxford University v Kent

Career statistics
Competition	First-class
Matches	14
Runs scored	115
Batting average	9.58
100s/50s	0/0
Top score	26*
Balls bowled	0
Wickets	-
Bowling average	-
5 wickets in innings	-
10 wickets in match	-
Best bowling	-
Catches/stumpings	8/4
- Source: CricketArchive, 4 December 2007

John Francis Nicholas Mayhew (6 December 1909 in India – 31 January 1999 in Brandon, Manitoba, Canada) was an English cricketer. A right-handed batsman and wicket-keeper, he played first-class cricket for Oxford University between 1929 and 1931.

== Career ==
=== First-class cricket ===
Mayhew made his first-class debut for Oxford University in 1929 against Derbyshire, the only match he played that year. He played eleven matches for them in 1930, including a match against Australia, gaining his blue against Cambridge University in July. He played twice for them in 1931, against Yorkshire and Kent.

=== Other cricket ===
In November 1933, Mayhew played for Shanghai in a three-day match against Malaya played in Hong Kong. He also played minor counties cricket for Buckinghamshire in 1947 and 1948.
