= Rattan Jaidka =

English cricketer

Personal information
- Full name: Rattan Chand Jaidka
- Born: 23 November 1900; Nakodar, Punjab Province, British India
- Died: 25 December 1985 (aged 85); Chandigarh, India
- Batting: Right-handed
- Bowling: Right-arm off-spin

Domestic team information
- Years: Team
- 1927: Gloucestershire
- FC debut: 11 June 1927 Gloucestershire v Cambridge University
- Last FC: 15 June 1927 Gloucestershire v Essex

Career statistics
Competition	First-class
Matches	2
Runs scored	5
Batting average	5.00
100s/50s	0/0
Top score	5
Balls bowled	264
Wickets	2
Bowling average	80.00
5 wickets in innings	0
10 wickets in match	0
Best bowling	1/57
Catches/stumpings	1/–
- Source: CricketArchive, 31 December 2007

Rattan Chand Jaidka (23 November 1900 – 25 December 1985) played first-class cricket for Gloucestershire in 1927. He later lectured in engineering colleges in Burma and India.

== Life and career ==
Born in Nakodar, Punjab Province, Jaidka studied engineering in Delhi and went to work in Malaya. He played twice for the Federated Malay States against the Straits Settlements in 1923 and 1924.

He studied Engineering at the University of Bristol between 1924 and 1927. In June 1927, he played two first-class matches for Gloucestershire, making his debut against Cambridge University before playing a County Championship match against Essex.

After completing his studies he took up a post as a lecturer at the Burmah Oil Company's engineering school in Rangoon, where he worked from 1930 to 1957, apart from a period during World War II when he taught at the Maclagan Engineering College in Lahore, where he coached the future Pakistan Test cricketer Fazal Mahmood. He returned to Burma after the war and became president of the Burma Cricket Club, organizing a tour by the Pakistan team.

He returned to India when the political climate in Burma changed, working first at Gwalior Engineering College then at Thapar Institute of Engineering and Technology in Patiala from 1959, where he was principal when he retired in 1970. He moved to Chandigarh, where was a member of the Punjab Cricket Association and encouraged the development of coaching.

He and his wife Sita Walia married in the 1930s and had eight children.
