= Interport matches =

Cricket matches

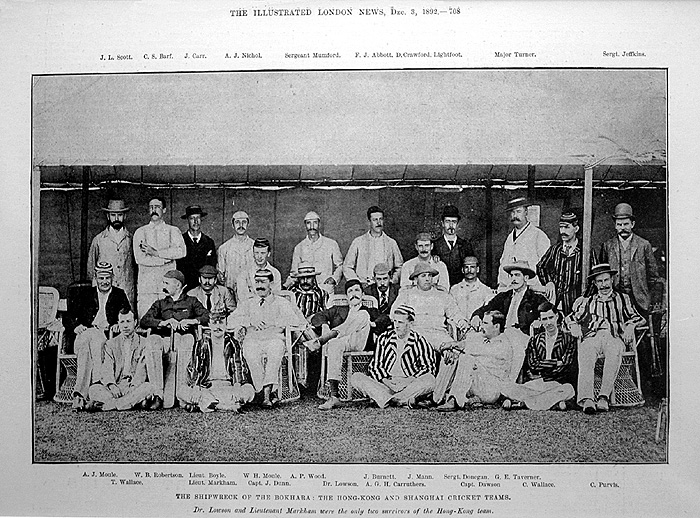
The Hong Kong and Shanghai teams from October 1892

Interport matches refer to a series of cricket matches which took place in Asia from 1866 to 1987, between Ceylon, the Federated Malay States, Hong Kong, Malaya, Malaysia, Shanghai, Singapore and the Straits Settlements.

In February 2020, the Hong Kong team played a five-match Twenty20 International (T20I) series against Malaysia. All the matches were played at the Kinrara Academy Oval, Kuala Lumpur. The series marked the return of Interport matches after a gap of 33 years. The series was originally scheduled to be played at the Mission Road Ground in Mong Kok, Hong Kong, but was cancelled in early February due to the coronavirus pandemic in China.

== History ==
Hong Kong were returning home on the SS Bokhara from their 1892 Interport match in Shanghai when it sank in a typhoon, killing eleven Hong Kong cricketers. As a result of this tragedy the Interport matches, which had been regular fixtures since 1889, didn't return for five years.

For matches in Shanghai, it was usually only Hong Kong who made the journey but when Hong Kong were Interport hosts, a third of fourth team would often join Shanghai for a series of matches.

No series or match was played from 1936 until 1947 due to the Pacific War. Shanghai stopped participating in Interport cricket after 1948, when the Communist Party took over China.

== Statistics ==
=== Team results summary ===
Result of some Interport matches are unknown so in the table below the combined wins, draws and losses may not add up to the total matches played by the team.

Team	Matches	Wins	Draws	Losses
Ceylon	3	1	1	1
Federated Malay States	2	1	1	0
Hong Kong	79	32	14	28
Malaya	16	8	0	8
Malaysia	7	0	5	0
Shanghai	48	20	2	24
Singapore	13	1	7	4
Straits Settlements	12	8	1	3

=== Record performances ===
The accuracy of some of the scorecards given for Interport matches have been disputed. The table below shows the leading team and individual performances over the years.

Record type	Record holder
Highest team score	Shanghai 479 all out
Highest individual score	Nigel Stearns (Hong Kong) 169
Best innings bowling figures	Alfred Hill (Malaya) 9/10
Best match bowling figures	VH Lanning (Shanghai) 13/44

== Matches played ==
List of Interport matches
No.	Date	Venue	Teams	Result	Ref.
1	15 February 1866	HKCC Ground	Hong Kong vs Shanghai	Hong Kong won by an innings and 264 runs	
2	18 May 1867	Shanghai CC	Shanghai vs Hong Kong	Shanghai won by 81 runs	
3	30 October 1889	Shanghai CC	Shanghai vs Hong Kong	Shanghai won by 3 wickets	
4	22 January 1890	HKCC Ground	Hong Kong vs Straits Settlements	Hong Kong won by an innings and 147 runs	
5	24 January 1890	HKCC Ground	Hong Kong vs Straits Settlements	Hong Kong won by 8 wickets	
6	31 December 1890	The Padang	Federated Malay States vs Ceylon	Match drawn	
7	3 January 1891	The Padang	Straits Settlements vs Hong Kong	Straits Settlements won by 166 runs	
8	5 January 1891	The Padang	Ceylon vs Hong Kong	Ceylon won by 10 wickets	
9	7 January 1891	The Padang	Straits Settlements vs Ceylon	Straits Settlements won by an innings and 18 runs	
10	9 January 1891	The Padang	Singapore Cricket Club vs Hong Kong	Hong Kong won by an innings and 5 runs	
11	10 January 1891	The Padang	Straits Settlements vs Ceylon and Hong Kong	Match drawn	
12	21 September 1891	Shanghai CC	Shanghai vs Hong Kong	Match drawn	
13	4 February 1892	HKCC Ground	Hong Kong vs Shanghai	Hong Kong won by an innings and 123 runs	
14	3 October 1892	Shanghai CC	Shanghai vs Hong Kong	Shanghai won by 157 runs	
15	8 November 1897	HKCC Ground	Hong Kong vs Straits Settlements	Straits Settlements won by an innings and 79 runs	
16	10 November 1897	HKCC Ground	Shanghai vs Straits Settlements	Straits Settlements won by an innings and 11 runs	
17	11 November 1897	HKCC Ground	Hong Kong vs Shanghai	Hong Kong won by 1 wicket	
18	14 November 1897	HKCC Ground	Hong Kong and Shanghai vs Straits Settlements	Straits Settlements won by an innings and 231 runs	
19	September ?, 1898	Shanghai CC	Shanghai vs Hong Kong	Hong Kong won by 28 runs	
20	11 November 1901	HKCC Ground	Hong Kong vs Straits Settlements	Hong Kong won by 129 runs	
21	14 November 1901	HKCC Ground	Shanghai vs Straits Settlements	Shanghai won by 1 run	
22	18 November 1901	HKCC Ground	Hong Kong vs Shanghai	Shanghai won by 7 wickets	
23	13 October 1903	Shanghai CC	Shanghai vs Hong Kong	Hong Kong won by an innings and 23 runs	
24	11 November 1904	HKCC Ground	Hong Kong vs Shanghai	Hong Kong won by 4 wickets	
25	15 November 1904	HKCC Ground	Shanghai vs Straits Settlements	Straits Settlements won by 52 runs	
26	17 November 1904	HKCC Ground	Hong Kong vs Straits Settlements	Straits Settlements won by 95 runs	
27	2 October 1906	Shanghai CC	Shanghai vs Hong Kong	Shanghai won by 139 runs	
28	16 November 1907	HKCC Ground	Hong Kong vs Shanghai	Hong Kong won by 4 wickets	
29	22 October 1908	Shanghai CC	Shanghai vs Hong Kong	Shanghai won by 10 wickets	
30	22 November 1909	HKCC Ground	Hong Kong vs Shanghai	Hong Kong won by an innings and 224 runs	
31	24 November 1909	HKCC Ground	Hong Kong vs Straits Settlements	Hong Kong won by 9 wickets	
32	26 November 1909	HKCC Ground	Shanghai vs Straits Settlements	Straits Settlements won by 4 wickets	
33	29 November 1909	HKCC Ground	Hong Kong vs Shanghai and Straits Settlements	Shanghai and SS won by 21 runs	
34	31 May 1911	Shanghai CC	Shanghai vs Hong Kong	Shanghai won by an innings and 26 runs	
35	11 November 1912	HKCC Ground	Hong Kong vs Shanghai	Hong Kong won by an innings and 36 runs	
36	26 May 1914	Shanghai CC	Shanghai vs Hong Kong	Shanghai won by 116 runs	
37	7 November 1920	HKCC Ground	Hong Kong vs Shanghai	Hong Kong won by 6 wickets	
38	9 November 1920	HKCC Ground	Hong Kong vs Malaya	Malaya won by 35 runs	
39	12 November 1920	HKCC Ground	Malaya vs Shanghai	Shanghai won by an innings and 140 runs	
40	14 November 1920	HKCC Ground	Hong Kong vs Shanghai and Malaya	Hong Kong won by 5 wickets	
41	17 May 1921	Shanghai CC	Shanghai vs Hong Kong	Shanghai won by an innings and 160 runs	
42	11 November 1922	HKCC Ground	Hong Kong vs Shanghai	Shanghai won by 2 wickets	
43	16 May 1923	Shanghai CC	Shanghai vs Hong Kong	Hong Kong won by 3 wickets	
44	13 November 1924	HKCC Ground	Hong Kong vs Shanghai	Hong Kong won by an innings and 5 runs	
45	16 November 1924	HKCC Ground	Malaya vs Shanghai	Shanghai won by 89 runs	
46	18 November 1924	HKCC Ground	Hong Kong vs Malaya	Hong Kong won by 2 wickets	
47	16 May 1925	Shanghai CC	Shanghai vs Hong Kong	Hong Kong won by 7 runs	
48	28 May 1926	The Padang	Malaya vs Hong Kong	Malaya won by an innings and 112 runs	
49	30 May 1926	Padang, Kuala Lumpur	Federated Malay States vs Hong Kong	FMS won by an innings and 107 runs	
50	16 November 1926	HKCC Ground	Hong Kong vs Shanghai	Shanghai won by 1 wicket	
51	19 November 1927	HKCC Ground	Hong Kong vs Shanghai	Hong Kong won by 3 wickets	
52	23 November 1927	HKCC Ground	Malaya vs Shanghai	Shanghai won by an innings and 45 runs	
53	27 November 1927	HKCC Ground	Hong Kong vs Malaya	Hong Kong won by an innings and 25 runs	
54	26 May 1928	Shanghai CC	Shanghai vs Hong Kong	Shanghai won by 120 runs	
55	5 November 1929	HKCC Ground	Malaya vs Shanghai	Shanghai won by 1 wicket	
56	10 November 1929	HKCC Ground	Hong Kong vs Shanghai	Hong Kong won by 82 runs	
57	13 November 1929	HKCC Ground	Hong Kong vs Malaya	Hong Kong won by 4 wickets	
58	19 May 1930	Shanghai CC	Shanghai vs Hong Kong	Match drawn	
59	14 November 1931	HKCC Ground	Hong Kong vs Shanghai	Shanghai won by 7 wickets	
60	21 May 1932	Shanghai CC	Shanghai vs Hong Kong	Hong Kong won by 42 runs	
61	6 November 1933	HKCC Ground	Hong Kong vs Malaya	Malaya won by 14 runs	
62	11 November 1933	HKCC Ground	Hong Kong vs Shanghai	Hong Kong won by 117 runs	
63	15 November 1933	HKCC Ground	Malaya vs Shanghai	Malaya won by 50 runs	
64	10 October 1934	Shanghai CC	Shanghai vs Hong Kong	Shanghai won by 270 runs	
65	9 November 1935	HKCC Ground	Hong Kong vs Shanghai	Hong Kong won by 31 runs	
66	6 October 1936	Shanghai CC	Shanghai vs Hong Kong	Shanghai won by 217 runs	
67	8 November 1947	HKCC Ground	Hong Kong vs Shanghai	Hong Kong won by 165 runs	
68	October 1948	Shanghai CC	Shanghai vs Hong Kong	Unknown	
69	27 November 1955	HKCC Ground	Hong Kong vs Malaya	Malaya won by 10 wickets	
70	17 May 1957	Padang, Kuala Lumpur	Malaya vs Hong Kong	Malaya won by 27 runs	
71	12 December 1959	HKCC Ground	Hong Kong vs Malaya	Malaya won by 1 wicket	
72	27 May 1961	Padang, Kuala Lumpur	Malaya vs Hong Kong	Malaya won 7 wickets	
73	23 November 1963	HKCC Ground	Hong Kong vs Malaya	Hong Kong won by 7 wickets	
74	21 May 1965	Padang, Kuala Lumpur	Malaysia vs Hong Kong	Match drawn	
75	10 May 1968	Padang, Kuala Lumpur	Malaysia vs Hong Kong	Match drawn	
76	18 May 1968	The Padang	Singapore vs Hong Kong	Match drawn	
77	7 November 1969	HKCC Ground	Hong Kong vs Singapore	Hong Kong won by 5 wickets	
78	2 April 1971	The Padang	Singapore vs Hong Kong	Singapore won by 96 runs	
79	12 November 1971	HKCC Ground	Hong Kong vs Malaysia	Match drawn	
80	24 November 1972	HKCC Ground	Hong Kong vs Singapore	Hong Kong won by 6 wickets	
81	26 April 1974	The Padang	Singapore vs Hong Kong	Match drawn	
82	4 May 1974	Padang, Kuala Lumpur	Malaysia vs Hong Kong	Match drawn	
83	1975	Penang Sports Club	Malaysia vs Hong Kong	Unknown	
84	28 November 1975	Kowloon CC	Hong Kong vs Singapore	Match drawn	
85	13 May 1977	The Padang	Singapore vs Hong Kong	Match drawn	
86	10 November 1978	HKCC Ground	Hong Kong vs Singapore	Match drawn	
87	9 May 1980	Tenaga NSC	Malaysia vs Hong Kong	Match drawn	
88	16 May 1980	The Padang	Singapore vs Hong Kong	Match drawn	
89	11 November 1981	HKCC Ground	Hong Kong vs Singapore	Match drawn	
90	1983	Padang, Kuala Lumpur	Malaysia vs Hong Kong	Unknown	
91	1983	Recreation Ground	Singapore vs Hong Kong	Unknown	
92	30 November 1984	HKCC Ground	Hong Kong vs Singapore	Hong Kong won by 98 runs	
93	15 May 1987	The Padang	Singapore vs Hong Kong	Hong Kong won by 149 runs	

== Series played ==
List of Interport series
No.	Date(s)	Venue(s)	Teams	Result	Ref.
1	20–26 February 2020	Kinrara Academy Oval	Malaysia and Hong Kong	Malaysia won the 5-match series 5–0	2020 Interport T20I Series
