= Archibald Spooner =

English cricketer

Personal information
- Full name: Archibald Franklin Spooner
- Born: 21 May 1886; Litherland, Lancashire, England
- Died: 11 January 1965 (aged 78); Dartmouth, Devon, England
- Batting: Right-handed

Domestic team information
- Years: Team
- 1906–1909: Lancashire
- FC debut: 16 July 1906 Lancashire v Somerset
- Last FC: 27 May 1909 Lancashire v Essex

Career statistics
Competition	First-class
Matches	18
Runs scored	500
Batting average	15.62
100s/50s	0/1
Top score	83
Catches/stumpings	8/0
- Source: CricketArchive, 29 December 2007

Archibald Franklin Spooner (1886–1965) was an English cricketer. A right-handed batsman, he played for Lancashire between 1906 and 1909. His brother Reginald played Test cricket for England.

== Biography ==
Born on 21 May 1886 in Litherland, near Liverpool, Lancashire in 1886, Spooner played twice for the Lancashire Second XI in 1902, and twice for Liverpool and District in 1904, against Cambridge University and South Africa. After a second match for Liverpool and District against Cambridge University in July 1906, he played two County Championship matches for Lancashire that month, against Somerset and Sussex.

He did not play for Lancashire in 1907, but played a fuller season in 1908, playing 15 County Championship matches. He played a final time for Lancashire in 1909, against Essex. He played for the Federated Malay States against the Straits Settlements in 1911. He died in Devon on 11 January 1965.
