= SS Bokhara =

British ocean liner (1872–1892)

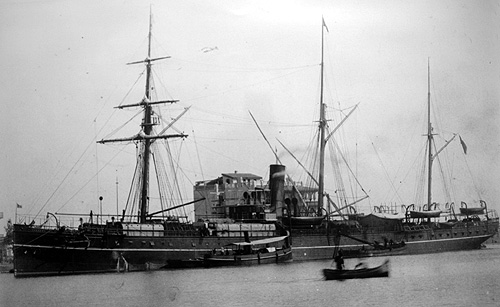

History

United Kingdom
- Owner: P&O
- Port of registry: London (1872-75); Greenock (1875-92)
- Builder: Caird & Company, Greenock, Scotland
- Launched: 18 December 1872
- Fate: Sank in a typhoon on 10 October 1892, killing 125 people

General characteristics
- Tonnage: 2,948 net
- Length: 365 ft (111.25 m)
- Beam: 39 ft (11.89 m)
- Draught: 22 ft (6.71 m)
- Depth: 29 feet (moulded)
- Speed: 13 knots max
- Crew: 143

The SS Bokhara was a P&O steamship which sank in a typhoon on 10 October 1892, off the coast of Sand Island in the Pescadores, Formosa. Of the 150 people who perished, eleven were members of the Hong Kong cricket team.

Hong Kong's cricket team had played an Interport cricket match against Shanghai at the Shanghai Cricket Club on 3 October 1892 and were returning home on the SS Bokhara.

== Ship history ==
Built by Caird & Company of Greenock, Scotland, and launched on 18 December 1872, the SS Bokhara had a two-cylinder compound inverted steam engine and was registered in London. The passenger liner travelled mainly to India and the Far East and in 1875 had its registry transferred to Greenock. On the ship's maiden voyage, in 1873, it was stranded on an uncharted rock off Hong Kong and after eventually refloating, it had to be docked at Kowloon for repairs. In 1884 the ship was used as a transport vessel for soldiers in the Mahdist War.

== Sinking ==
The ship set off from Shanghai on 8 October, due to arrive at Hong Kong on the 11th and was then bound for Colombo and Bombay. On board were 173 people, as well as silk, tea and general cargo to the weight of 1500 tons.

An unforecast typhoon struck on 9 October and after various early manoeuvres the ship lay a-hull in the hope of drifting down the centre of the Taiwan Strait until the storm - which the captain thought would cross the strait and land near Xiamen - had passed. Unluckily the storm was recurving and passing up the west coast of Taiwan. The expected drift in a generally south west direction was actually between south and south south west straight towards the Penghu Islands. The winds worsened on the 10th and as the ship rolled violently the ships boats were smashed and the deckhouse damaged. At ten o'clock on the night of the 10 October three huge waves boarded the ship, smashed the engine and boiler room skylights and, folding below, doused the boilers, filling the machinery spaces with steam.

The engineers tried in vain get the boiler going again to raise steam, but at around eleven forty the watch on the bridge saw land only a few hundred yards away directly to leeward. The captain went below to warn the passengers and get them on deck, but it was too late. At about eleven forty-five the ship struck the reef twice, with the second strike causing the starboard side to be ripped wide open and within two minutes the Bokhara had sunk.

== Rescue ==
The survivors, who lay injured on the beach, were found by local Chinese fishermen who brandished axes and knives. After salvaging bits and pieces from the wreckage, the fishermen then took the survivors to Peihou Island followed by Makung, where they were looked after by the locals. They were then picked up by the Douglas Steamer Thales, who transferred the survivors to HMS Porpoise which was heading to Hong Kong.

== Victims and survivors ==
There is residual uncertainty about exactly how many people were aboard the ship. The best estimate is 173, but it could have been more since at least one child, whose body was identified is not amongst those normally listed as being aboard. Equally it could have been as few as 140, the major uncertainty being how many lascar (Indian) seafarers were working in the engine and boiler rooms. Confusion was also caused by the total loss of the two-year-old Norwegian cargo steamer Normand, Car. Michelsen Co. (Captain Jonsson), which had been lost 28 hours earlier, at 1050 p.m. the previous day, the 9th, on Tortoise Rock, which is about 3.1 nautical miles south west of where the Bokhara went down. Of the 26 crew of the Normand all survived the immediate wreck, but all but two were swept away when the mizzen mast, to which everyone was clinging, collapsed. There were almost no lifejackets aboard. The two crew who survived, 2nd Engineer John Nistad and Ordinary Seaman Thomas Herness, were washed ashore on Wang An Island some 20 miles south of the wreck site, and only about a mile apart, after some seventeen hours in the water. Initially they were taken to be Bokhara survivors, adding to the uncertainties.

Only two Hong Kong cricketers survived, Dr James Lowson and Lieutenant Markham. Lowson had to have a lung removed but continued to play cricket for Hong Kong until 1898. First-class cricketer Ernest Coxon and former Hampshire player Horatio Dumbleton both played in Hong Kong's interport match against Shanghai earlier that year but were, fortunately for them, were unable to play in the October fixture and did not travel with the team.

A further 21 people were saved from the water, including the Chief Officer, Third and Fourth Officers and two European Quartermasters. The other 16 survivors were the lascar crew, though one of them died of his injuries in Anping on Taiwan shortly after the Thales' arrival.

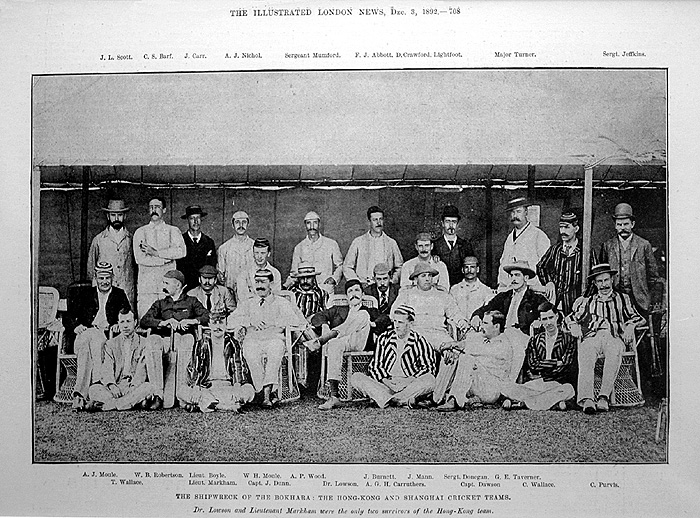
Hong Kong and Shanghai's cricket teams pose for a photograph.

The eleven Hong Kong cricketers to die were -

- Lieutenant C.G. Boyle
- Lieutenant Burnett
- Captain Dawson
- Sergeant Donegan
- Captain John Dunn
- Quartermaster-Sergeant Jeffkins
- Sergeant Mumford
- G.S. Purvis, Esq.
- G.E. Taverner, Esq.
- Major Turner
- C. Wallace, Esq.

Famous Colorado artist Helen Henderson Chain and her husband also died on this voyage.

== Aftermath ==
A Marine Board of Inquiry was launched but after only two days of testimony found that accident was not caused by the wrongful act or default of any Certified Officer and commended the crew on their efforts to avoid the tragedy.

With the Hong Kong cricket community in mourning, the Interport series did not resume until 1897.

Sand Island in the Pescadores, where the ship sank, was until recently within a Taiwanese military firing range. However it is now open to tourists and accessible at high tide, and the monument to the Bokhara has been restored.
