= Cyril Simpson =

English cricketer

Personal information
- Full name: Cyril Charles Simpson
- Born: 19 April 1874; Erpingham, Norfolk, England
- Died: 5 June 1953 (aged 79); Hove, Sussex, England

Domestic team information
- Years: Team
- 1908: Northamptonshire
- Source: CricketArchive, 13 December 2007

Cyril Charles Simpson (19 April 1874 – 5 June 1953) was an English cricketer. He played one first-class match for Northamptonshire against Essex in 1908. He later played three matches for the Straits Settlements against the Federated Malay States between 1919 and 1922.
