= Alfred Hill (cricketer, born 1887) =

English cricketer

Personal information
- Full name: Alfred John Bostock Hill
- Born: 8 April 1887; Olton, Solihull, Warwickshire, England
- Died: 20 August 1959 (aged 72); Okehampton, Devon, England
- Bowling: Right-arm

Domestic team information
- Years: Team
- 1920: Warwickshire
- Source: CricketArchive, 1 January 2008

Alfred John Bostock Hill, also known as Alfred John Bostock-Hill (1887–1959) was an English cricketer. A right-arm bowler, he played one first-class match for Warwickshire in 1920. The nephew of Warwickshire players Henry Hill and John Hill, he later had a more successful cricket career in the Far East.

== Biography ==
Born in Solihull on 8 April 1887, Hill played for the Warwickshire Second XI against the Worcestershire Second XI in 1910, but did not play for the first team until 1920, when he played a County Championship match against Surrey, his only first-class match.

At some point in the early 1920s, he moved to the Federated Malay States and first played for the Federated Malay States cricket team in 1924 in a match against the Straits Settlements in Kuala Lumpur. In May 1926, he represented the combined Malaya cricket team against Hong Kong in Singapore, followed by matches in Kuala Lumpur for the Federated Malay States against Hong Kong and the Straits Settlements. He played for the Federated Malay States against the Straits Settlements again in 1927.

In 1929, he played for the Federated Malay States against the Straits Settlements, and for Malaya against Hong Kong and Shanghai in Hong Kong. He played three times for the Federated Malay States against the Straits Settlements in the 1930s before moving back to England. He died in Devon on 20 August 1959.
