= Edward Baker (cricketer, born 1892) =

English cricketer (1892–1969)

Personal information
- Full name: Edward Conrad Baker
- Born: 7 January 1892; Carmarthen, Wales
- Died: 8 April 1969 (aged 77); Maidenhead, Berkshire, England
- Batting: Right-handed
- Bowling: Right-arm fast bowling
- Role: Bowler

Domestic team information
- Years: Team
- 1912–1914: Cambridge University
- 1912–1919: Sussex
- 1921: Somerset
- First-class debut: 10 June 1912 Cambridge University v Free Foresters
- Last First-class: 21 May 1921 Somerset v Cambridge University

Career statistics
| Competition | First-class |
|---|---|
| Matches | 21 |
| Runs scored | 334 |
| Batting average | 11.51 |
| 100s/50s | 0/1 |
| Top score | 63* |
| Balls bowled | 3592 |
| Wickets | 69 |
| Bowling average | 26.30 |
| 5 wickets in innings | 2 |
| 10 wickets in match | 0 |
| Best bowling | 5/18 |
| Catches/stumpings | 5/0 |
- Source: CricketArchive, 15 December 2007

Edward Conrad Baker (7 January 1892 in Carmarthen, Wales – 8 April 1969 in Maidenhead, Berkshire, England) was an English cricketer. A right-handed batsman and right-arm fast-medium bowler, he played first-class cricket between 1912 and 1921.

== Career ==
Baker made his first-class debut for Cambridge University against the Free Foresters in June 1912. Later the same month, he played against Cambridge University for Sussex. The following month, he played for Cambridge University against the Marylebone Cricket Club (MCC) at Lord's, following which he gained his blue when he played against Oxford University at the same ground.

Baker played three first-class matches for Cambridge University in 1913 and played ten for them in 1914. He played his first County Championship match for Sussex that year against Middlesex.

In the first season of cricket after the First World War, Baker played six matches for Sussex. In 1921 he played a match for Somerset against Cambridge University. In 1923, he played for the Straits Settlements against the Federated Malay States.
