= Walter Parsons =

Walter Parsons may refer to:

- Walter Parsons (cricketer) (1861–1939), English cricketer
- Walter Parsons (politician) (1881–1955), Australian politician
