= Robert Phayre =

Robert Phayre may refer to:

- Robert Phayre (regicide) (1619?–1682), officer in the Irish Protestant and then the New Model armies, regicide of Charles I of England
- Robert Phayre (Indian Army officer) (1820–1897)
- Robert Phayre (cricketer) (1901–1993), British soldier and cricketer
