= Gerald Aste =

English cricketer based in India

Personal information
- Born: 30 July 1900; Beckenham, South London, England
- Died: 17 September 1961 (aged 61); Salisbury, Wiltshire, England
- Role: Bowler

Domestic team information
- Years: Team
- 1936: Delhi
- 1936: Cricket Club of India
- 1933: Sind
- 1922–1927: Europeans (India)
- FC debut: 8 January 1922 Europeans (India) v Indians
- Last FC: 15 February 1936 Delhi v Northern India

Career statistics
Competition	First-class
Matches	11
Runs scored	164
Batting average	9.11
100s/50s	0/0
Top score	33
Balls bowled	1,214
Wickets	19
Bowling average	27.05
5 wickets in innings	1
10 wickets in match	0
Best bowling	5/90
Catches/stumpings	15/–
- Source: CricketArchive, 12 November 2023

Gerald Aste (30 July 1900 – 17 September 1961) was an English cricketer based in India for many years, whose first-class career spanned the 1921/22 to 1935/36 Indian seasons. He played for various teams but mainly the Europeans. In that respect, he was unusual as he played for them in both the Madras Presidency Match and the Bombay Quadrangular.

== Career ==
Born in Beckenham, Kent, Aste was educated at Felsted School near Great Dunmow, in Essex. He played for his school team several times in 1915 and 1916. On 22 August 1917, he played at Lord's Cricket Ground, in St John's Wood, for a Public Schools team against one representing the Grenadier Guards. This was a one-day single-innings match which the Guards won by 34 runs after scoring 245/4 declared and bowling out Schools for 211. Aste did not take any wickets and he scored 13 runs, batting no. 6 for the Schools.

Aste was 18 soon after leaving school in July 1918. He enlisted in the Royal Air Force under service number 180867. This was only three months before the end of the First World War. Aste was demobilised in 1919 and became a bank clerk.

By the end of 1921, Aste had relocated to India where he made his first-class debut in January 1922, playing for the Europeans against the Indians in the annual Madras Presidency Match at Chepauk Stadium. He made five successive appearances in the match to January 1926, and was twice on the winning team. His best performances in the fixture were in 1925 and 1926. In the first of those matches, he took six wickets and two catches, helping the Europeans to win by 125 runs. In 1926, he opened the bowling and achieved his career-best figures of 5/90. He also took two catches as Indians were dismissed for 250 in answer to Europeans' score of 379. Europeans were bowled out for only 88 in their second innings but still won the match by 66 runs after Indians scored 151. Aste took 2/68 in the second innings while Alexander Penfold, who later played for Surrey, took 8/43.

In September 1926, Aste played for the Europeans in the Bombay Quadrangular for the first time. He played in the final of that tournament in 1927. Aste moved to Malaya, where he played twice for the Straits Settlements against the Federated Malay States in 1929 and 1931. He then returned to India and played for Sind against Marylebone Cricket Club in 1933. In 1936, he played for the Cricket Club of India against Australia and, in his final match, for Delhi in the Ranji Trophy.
