= Henry Nicoll =

Henry Nicoll may refer to:

- Henry Nicoll (politician) (1812–1879), United States Representative from New York
- Henry Nicoll (cricketer) (1883–1948), Scottish cricketer
- Henry Nicoll (equestrian) (1908–1999), British equestrian
