= Francis Mugliston =

English cricketer

Personal information
- Full name: Francis Hugh Mugliston
- Born: 7 June 1886; Singapore, Straits Settlements
- Died: 3 October 1932 (aged 46); Mayfair, Westminster, London, England
- Batting: Right-handed
- Bowling: Right-arm slow-medium
- Role: Batsman

Domestic team information
- Years: Team
- 1905–1908: Cambridge University
- 1906–1908: Lancashire
- 1909–1911: HDG Leveson-Gower's XI
- 1910: MCC
- First-class debut: 18 May 1905 Cambridge University v Warwickshire
- Last First-class: 29 June 1911 HDG Leveson-Gower's XI v Oxford University

Career statistics
Competition	First-class
Matches	33
Runs scored	874
Batting average	16.18
100s/50s	1/2
Top score	109
Balls bowled	518
Wickets	4
Bowling average	75.25
5 wickets in innings	0
10 wickets in match	0
Best bowling	3/32
Catches/stumpings	16/–
- Source: CricketArchive, 15 August 2022

Francis Hugh Mugliston OBE (7 June 1886 – 3 October 1932) was an English cricketer. A right-handed batsman and right-arm slow-medium bowler, he played first-class cricket for various teams between 1905 and 1911, mainly for Cambridge University. He was an all-round sportsman at Cambridge University where he won Blues for cricket, Association football and golf.

== Career ==
Born 7 June 1886 in Singapore, Mugliston was educated at Rossall School and at Pembroke College, Cambridge. He was captain of the Cambridge football team and also played soccer for Corinthian F.C., the amateur club, including a tour of South Africa with the team in 1907.

Mugliston's first recorded cricket match was for the Straits Settlements against the Federated Malay States in February 1905. The same year, he made his first-class debut, playing for Cambridge University against Warwickshire and Gloucestershire, also playing three matches for the Lancashire Second XI that year.

He played twice more for Cambridge University in 1906, also playing two County Championship matches for Lancashire against Somerset and Sussex that year. He played several first-class matches for the university side in 1907 and 1908, gaining his blue in both years. He also represented the university at golf and football.

He played his final five matches for Lancashire in 1908, following which he played first-class cricket sporadically between 1909 and 1911, including one match for the Marylebone Cricket Club (MCC).

== After cricket ==
After leaving Cambridge, he studied law and was called as a barrister to the Inner Temple in 1911; instead of practising law, however, he joined the Sudan civil service, though he was soon invalided home after catching dysentery. He joined the Duke of Cornwall's Light Infantry in September 1914 and was severely wounded at Ypres the following year. Discharged from the army, he joined the Aliens branch of the Home Office and was deputy chief inspector of the Aliens department at the time of his death. He died 3 October 1932 in Mayfair, London.

=== Rescue during World War I ===
Francis Mugliston was severely injured at Hooge (Ypres) on 27/28 June 1915. He was rescued by Private Jones (6 / DCLI). Under heavy rifle and shell fire Jones rescued two men who had been completely buried. He then proceeded to dress Mugliston, carrying him (still under heavy fire) to a dressing station two miles away. For these acts of "conspicuous gallantry" Private Jones was awarded the DCM – the first in Kitchener's New Army. A picture confirming this was published in the Daily Mirror. He was Gazetted on 6 September 1915.

As an act of gratitude Lieutenant Mugliston presented Jones with a silver cigarette case inscribed with his initials and 'From F.H. Mugliston, Hooge 1915'. Private Jones was transferred into the Machine Gun Corps and subsequently listed as 'Missing presumed K.I.A'. His body was never found and he is recorded on the Thiepval Memorial, Pier and Face 5C and 12C.
