= Helen Henderson =

Helen Henderson may refer to:

- Helen Timmons Henderson (1877–1925), American schoolteacher and politician from Virginia
- Helen Ruth Henderson (1898–1982), her daughter, Virginia schoolteacher and politician
- Helen Anne Henderson (1946–2015), Canadian disability rights activist and journalist
- Helen Henderson Chain (1849–1892), née Henderson, American artist and mountaineer
