= John Hill (English cricketer) =

English cricketer (1867–1963)

Personal information
- Full name: John Ernest Hill
- Born: 27 September 1867; Handsworth, Warwickshire, England
- Died: 2 December 1963 (aged 96); Smethwick, Staffordshire, England
- Batting: Right-handed
- Bowling: Left-arm medium
- Relatives: Henry Hill (brother); Alfred Hill (nephew)

Domestic team information
- Years: Team
- 1894–1898: Warwickshire

Career statistics
| Competition | First-class |
|---|---|
| Matches | 27 |
| Runs scored | 737 |
| Batting average | 23.77 |
| 100s/50s | 1/1 |
| Top score | 139* |
| Balls bowled | 15 |
| Wickets | – |
| Bowling average | – |
| 5 wickets in innings | – |
| 10 wickets in match | – |
| Best bowling | – |
| Catches/stumpings | 20/– |
- Source: Cricinfo, 15 July 2012

John Ernest Hill (27 September 1867 – 2 December 1963) was an English cricketer. He was a right-handed batsman who bowled left-arm medium pace. He was born at Handsworth, Warwickshire.

Hill made his first-class debut for Warwickshire against Nottinghamshire in 1894 at Trent Bridge. He made 24 further first-class appearances for the county, the last of which came against Leicestershire at Edgbaston in the 1898 County Championship. In his 25 first-class matches for the county, he scored 665 runs at an average of 22.16, with a high score of 139 not out. This score, which was his only century, came against Nottinghamshire in his debut match. He also made a single first-class appearance each for the South against the North in 1894 and for Midland Counties against the touring Australians in 1896.

He died at Smethwick, Staffordshire, on 2 December 1963. His brother, Henry, played first-class cricket, as did his nephew Alfred Hill.
