= Bishop's Hull =

Village and civil parish in Somerset, England

Coordinates: 51.01522°N 3.13897°W

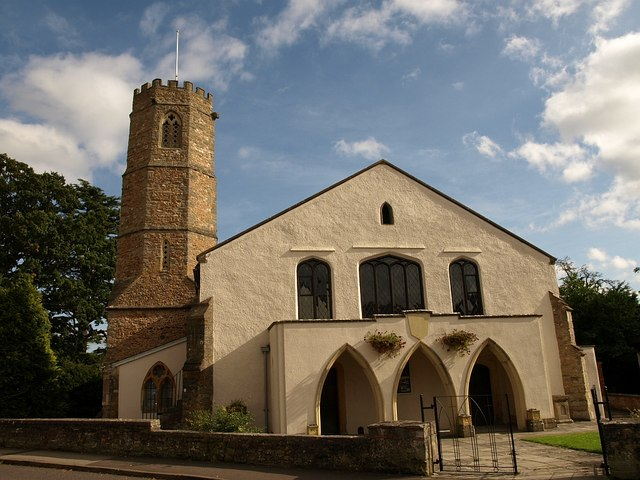
- St Peter and St Paul's Church

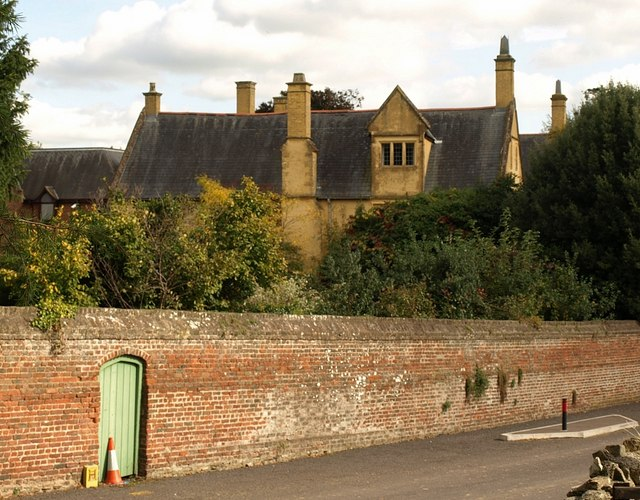
- Manor House, Bishop's Hull

- Location within Somerset
- Population: 2,075
- OS grid reference: ST202246
- Unitary authority: Somerset Council
- Ceremonial county: Somerset
- Region: South West
- Country: England
- Sovereign state: United Kingdom
- Post town: TAUNTON
- Postcode district: TA1
- Dialling code: 01823
- Police: Avon and Somerset
- Fire: Devon and Somerset
- Ambulance: South Western
- UK Parliament: Taunton and Wellington

Bishop's Hull is a village and civil parish in Somerset, England, in the western suburbs of Taunton. It includes the areas of Rumwell, Rumwell Park, Roughmoor and Longaller and is close to the River Tone. The parish, which includes the hamlet of Netherclay, has a population of 2,975 in total.

The A38 and the A3065 pass through it.

== History ==
The parish of Hull-Bishop's was part of the Taunton Deane Hundred.

Historically the parish included the castle precincts in the centre of Taunton. In 1885 the parish was divided into two: Bishop's Hull Within and Bishop's Hull Without. Bishop's Hull Within contained a relatively small area of 109 acres (44 ha) on the urbanising fringe of Taunton, but with a population 594 in 1891. Bishop's Hull Without contained the rural remainder of the parish, with 1,441 acres (583 ha) and a population 1,097 in 1891. In 1921, Bishop's Hull Within parish was abolished and the area taken into the expanding municipal borough of Taunton; today it is part of Taunton parish. In 1976, Bishop's Hull Without parish was renamed to Bishop's Hull.

In June 2008, the village celebrated the 400th anniversary of the church bells with a week of events.

== Governance ==
The parish council has responsibility for local issues, including setting an annual precept (local rate) to cover the council's operating costs and producing annual accounts for public scrutiny. The parish council evaluates local planning applications and works with the local police, district council officers, and neighbourhood watch groups on matters of crime, security, and traffic. The parish council's role also includes initiating projects for the maintenance and repair of parish facilities, as well as consulting with the district council on the maintenance, repair, and improvement of highways, drainage, footpaths, public transport, and street cleaning. Conservation matters (including trees and listed buildings) and environmental issues are also the responsibility of the council.

For local government purposes, since 1 April 2023, the village comes under the unitary authority of Somerset Council. Prior to this, it was part of the non-metropolitan district of Somerset West and Taunton (formed on 1 April 2019) and, before this, the district of Taunton Deane (established under the Local Government Act 1972). Bishop's Hull was part of Taunton Rural District before that.

It is also part of the Taunton and Wellington county constituency represented in the House of Commons of the Parliament of the United Kingdom. It elects one Member of Parliament (MP) by the first past the post system of election, and was part of the South West England constituency of the European Parliament prior to Britain leaving the European Union in January 2020, which elected seven MEPs using the d'Hondt method of party-list proportional representation.

== Geography ==
Netherclay Community Woodland is a woodland with oak, ash, black poplar, dogwood and hazel. It is a local nature reserve.

== Landmarks ==
The manor house dates from 1586, with a mid-19th century addition and internal alterations, and further restoration in 1901.

=== Rumwell Park ===
Rumwell Park house is a Grade II listed rococo mansion dating from 1857. It is located on Stonegallows, between Bishop's Hull and Galmington.

=== Rumwell Hall ===
Rumwell Hall is an historic manor house now a business centre. A new house on the site was built for Sir Edward Seymour in 1733. The current house was built for William Cadbury and completed about 1815. It was altered in the early 20th century for Charles Leslie Fox J.P. and restored in the late 20th century as an hotel.

=== Hospice ===
Bishop's Hull is home to St Margaret's Somerset Hospice, which provides palliative care to cancer patients from across the area.

=== Frank Bond Centre ===
The Frank Bond Centre, established in 1983, is named after its benefactor, a local builder who had two hobbies: collecting theatre organs and keeping exotic birds. He opened his garden once a year to the general public and all money that was raised went to charity. On his death he left his house and garden (now the centre) and land to the community. The land was used for development, some for housing and some for the building of St Margaret's Hospice.

== Religious sites ==
The St Peter and St Paul's Church, on Bishop's Hull Hill, which is a Grade II* listed building dating from the 13th century, and has an octagonal tower.

Until March 2005 Taunton United Reformed Church had a church on Bishop's Hull Road, the church was built in 1718 and the building is a Grade II* listed building. After the United Reformed Church in Bishop's Hull closed, services were moved to St Peter and St Paul's Church until 2013 when the United Reformed Church minister retired.

== Notable people ==
- Ernest Coxon (1857–1924), cricketer
