= Robert Phayre (cricketer) =

British soldier and cricketer

Personal information
- Full name: Robert Arthur Phayre
- Born: 4 January 1901; Maidenhead, Berkshire, England
- Died: 31 December 1993 (aged 92); Camberley, Surrey, England
- Source: CricketArchive, 15 December 2007

Brigadier Robert Arthur Phayre DSO (4 January 1901 – 31 December 1993) was a British soldier and cricketer.

== Biography ==
After playing Minor counties cricket for Oxfordshire in 1922 and 1923 he began to serve in the Army, playing cricket whilst stationed overseas. In 1924, he played for the Straits Settlements against the Federated Malay States and for Malaya against Shanghai and Hong Kong, and in 1929, played two first-class matches in India.

His cricket career ended in 1930 with two final matches for Oxfordshire and he served in World War II, during which he was awarded the Distinguished Service Order for his part in the D-Day landings.

In 1973, he was appointed a Knight of the order of the Hospital of Saint John of Jerusalem

== Family ==
He was the son of Major-General Sir Arthur Phayre (1856–1940), a nephew of Lt-General Arthur Purves Phayre - and Catherine Mary née Anderson (1868–1917).
