= Phayer =

Phayer or Phaer is a surname. Notable people with the surname include:

- Michael Phayer (born 1935), American historian
- Thomas Phaer (alternate spelling Phayer, c. 1510–1560), English lawyer, pediatrician, and author

== See also ==
- Fayer
