= Henry Hill (Warwickshire cricketer) =

English cricketer

Personal information
- Full name: Henry Barratt Grosvenor Hill
- Born: 23 July 1861; Birmingham, Warwickshire, England
- Died: 4 June 1913 (aged 51); Birmingham, Warwickshire, England
- Batting: Right-handed
- Bowling: Slow left-arm orthodox
- Relatives: John Hill (brother); John Hill (nephew)

Domestic team information
- Years: Team
- 1894–1900: Warwickshire

Career statistics
Competition	First-class
Matches	5
Runs scored	41
Batting average	6.83
100s/50s	–/–
Top score	13
Balls bowled	438
Wickets	5
Bowling average	49.60
5 wickets in innings	–
10 wickets in match	–
Best bowling	3/15
Catches/stumpings	3/–
- Source: Cricinfo, 23 January 2013

Henry Barratt Grosvenor Hill (23 July 1861 – 4 June 1913) was an English cricketer. Hill was a right-handed batsman who bowled slow left-arm orthodox. He was born at Birmingham, Warwickshire.

Hill made his first-class debut in Warwickshire's inaugural first-class match against Nottinghamshire at Trent Bridge in 1894. He made two further first-class appearances in that year against Surrey and Gloucestershire, while the following year he made a single first-class appearance against Yorkshire in the County Championship at Park Avenue, Bradford. Five years later he made a final first-class appearance for Warwickshire against London County. In five first-class matches, Hill scored 41 runs at an average of 6.83, with a high score of 13. With the ball, he took 5 wickets at a bowling average of 49.60, with best figures of 3/15.

He died at the city of his birth on 4 June 1913. His brother John Hill and nephew Alfred Hill both played first-class cricket.
