= William Cockburn (banker) =

Scottish banker and cricketer (1891–1957)

Sir William Cockburn
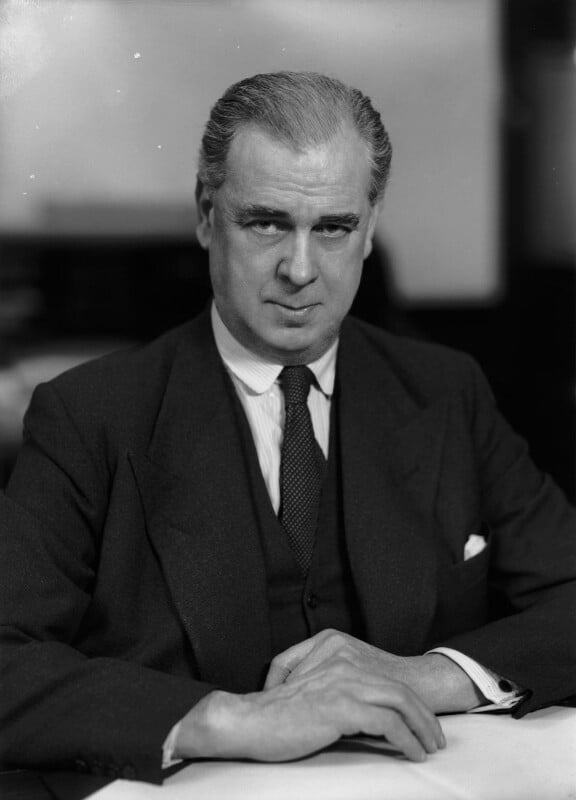
- Cockburn in 1953

Personal information
- Full name: William Robert Marshall Cockburn
- Born: 26 April 1891; Paisley, Renfrewshire, Scotland
- Died: 1 September 1957 (aged 66); Winchester, Hampshire, England

Domestic team information
- Years: Team
- 1921: Scotland
- Source: CricketArchive, 31 December 2007

Sir William Robert Marshall Cockburn (26 April 1891 – 1 September 1957) was a Scottish banker who spent most of his career with the Chartered Bank of India, Australia and China. He became the bank's managing director from 1940 to 1955.

Cockburn also had a brief career as a cricketer. He played once for the Scotland national cricket team in 1921.

== Early life ==
Cockburn was born on 26 April 1891 in Paisley, where his father George Cockburn was a schoolmaster. He was educated at Paisley Grammar School and at the Glasgow High School.

In 1908, aged 16, he became an apprentice at the Union Bank of Scotland, before joining the Chartered Bank in 1911.

== Career ==
Cockburn's career with the bank took him overseas, firstly as a cadet in the banks branches on the coast of China.

He then held various posts across Southeast Asia and the East Asia, serving with the bank in Indo-China, Malaya, Japan and China. In 1934 he became manager of the bank's branch in Shanghai.

He returned to the United Kingdom in 1936 or 1937, when he became assistant general manager of the Chartered Bank. He was promoted in 1940 to become chief general manager, and held that post for until 1955, when he retired to become a director of the bank.

The 15 years of Cockburn's tenure as general manager included both World War II and the subsequent reconstruction of the Far East. In a few months at the end of 1941 and early 1942, two thirds of bank's eastern branches fell to the Japanese conquest of Asia, and were sequestrated.

Cockburn was recognised as an expert on the economies of Asia, especially of China. He served as Chairman of the Eastern Exchange Banks Association and the British Overseas Banks Association, as vice-president of the British Bankers' Association and as president of the Manchester and District Institute of Bankers.

Cockburn was knighted in the 1955 New Year Honours list. The title was conferred 18 March 1955.

== Cricket ==
Cockburn played three times for the Federated Malay States against the Straits Settlements between 1919 and 1921, before playing his only match for Scotland, a first-class match against Ireland in August 1921. He died in Winchester on 1 September 1957.

== Death ==
Cockburn, who lived at Twyford in Hampshire, had a succession of serious illnesses in the last 20 years of his life. He died aged 66 on 1 September 1957, and was survived by his wife and a daughter. His funeral was held at St Johns crematorium in Woking.
