= John Neve =

English cricketer

Personal information
- Full name: John Tanner Neve
- Source: CricketArchive, 15 December 2007

John Tanner Neve (2 October 1902 – 7 July 1976) was an English cricketer. A right-handed batsman and right-arm medium pace bowler, he played one first-class match for the Marylebone Cricket Club in 1936.

== Career ==
In 1926, Neve played for the Straits Settlements against the Federated Malay States in Kuala Lumpur. Nine years later, in 1935, he played for the MCC against Ireland at Lord's.

In 1936, he played his only first-class game, for the MCC against Ireland in Dublin. The following year he played for the MCC on a tour of Canada. In 1938, he played for the MCC against Ireland in Dublin, and for the Minor Counties against Sir J Cahn's XI.
