= Percy Farrant =

Welsh cricketer

Personal information
- Full name: Percy Robert Farrant
- Born: 25 April 1868; Llandudno, Caernarvonshire, Wales
- Died: 4 September 1921 (aged 53) at sea aboard SS Ortega, off the Maldives
- Batting: Right-handed
- Bowling: Right-arm fast

Domestic team information
- Years: Team
- 1890: Oxford University

Career statistics
Competition	First-class
Matches	2
Runs scored	12
Batting average	4.00
100s/50s	–/–
Top score	5*
Balls bowled	30
Wickets	1
Bowling average	30.00
5 wickets in innings	–
10 wickets in match	–
Best bowling	1/20
Catches/stumpings	1/–
- Source: Cricinfo, 3 May 2020

Percy Robert Farrant (25 April 1868 – 4 September 1921) was a Welsh first-class cricketer and educator.

The son of Robert Farrant, he was born at Llandudno in April 1868. He was educated at Repton School, before going up to New College, Oxford. While studying at Oxford, he made two appearances in first-class cricket for Oxford University in 1890, against the touring Australians and the Gentlemen of England, though without much success in either match, with Farrant taking one wicket, that of the Gentlemen of England's Ernest Coxon, in addition to scoring 12 runs.

After graduating from Oxford, Farrant was commissioned as a second lieutenant in the Worcestershire and Warwickshire Volunteer Artillery in July 1892, with promotion to lieutenant coming in November 1893. He resigned his commission in February 1894. After leaving the Volunteer Artillery, Farrant became an assistant master at Malvern College. He died aboard SS Ortega off the coast of the Maldives in September 1921.
