= Charles Higginbotham =

English cricketer and British Army officer (1866–1915)

Personal information
- Full name: Charles Ernest Higginbotham
- Born: 4 July 1866; Charing Cross, Glasgow, Scotland
- Died: 11 March 1915 (aged 48); Neuve Chapelle, France
- Batting: Right-handed
- Role: Batsman

Domestic team information
- Years: Team
- 1906: South African Army
- 1912: British Army
- FC debut: 12 January 1906 South Africa Army v MCC
- Last FC: 30 May 1912 Army v Royal Navy

Career statistics
Competition	First-class
Matches	2
Runs scored	45
Batting average	15.00
100s/50s	0/0
Top score	40*
Catches/stumpings	1/–
- Source: CricketArchive, 4 December 2007

Charles Ernest Higginbotham (4 July 1866 – 11 March 1915) was a British soldier who also had a notable cricket career.

== Biography ==
After attending Rugby School and the Royal Military College, Sandhurst, Higginbotham was commissioned a second lieutenant in the Northamptonshire Regiment on 5 February 1887.

He was promoted to lieutenant on 16 April 1890, and stationed in the Far East, where he played cricket for the Straits Settlements, playing three matches against Hong Kong between 1890 and 1891.

Following promotion to captain on 2 January 1899, he served during the Second Boer War in South Africa, and was superintendent of gymnasia until July 1902, when he returned to his regiment. He took part in some Minor Counties cricket for Devon in the first years of the 20th century.

Whilst stationed in South Africa after the end of the war, he made his first-class debut in January 1906, playing for the South African Army against the touring Marylebone Cricket Club (MCC) team, who were in fact the touring England cricket team.

He played one further first-class match, playing for the Army against the Royal Navy at Lord's in May 1912.

He was killed in action while on active service during the First World War at the Battle of Neuve Chapelle in March 1915.
