= Thomas Hart (civil servant) =

Scotland dual-international rugby union player & cricketer

Personal information
- Full name: Thomas Mure Hart
- Born: 1 March 1909; Glasgow, Lanarkshire, Scotland
- Died: 16 January 2001 (aged 91); Hampshire, England
- Batting: Right-handed
- Bowling: Right-arm fast-medium
- Role: All-rounder

Domestic team information
- Years: Team
- 1931–1932: Oxford University
- FC debut: 20 June 1931 Oxford University v Army
- Last FC: 27 July 1934 Scotland v Australia

Career statistics
| Competition | First-class |
|---|---|
| Matches | 12 |
| Runs scored | 318 |
| Batting average | 19.87 |
| 100s/50s | 0/1 |
| Top score | 57 |
| Balls bowled | 1160 |
| Wickets | 9 |
| Bowling average | 51.66 |
| 5 wickets in innings | 0 |
| 10 wickets in match | 0 |
| Best bowling | 3/26 |
| Catches/stumpings | 5/– |
- Source: CricketArchive, 4 December 2008

Thomas Mure Hart, CMG (1 March 1909 – 16 January 2001) was a Scottish cricketer and rugby union player. He played twice for the Scotland national rugby union team and twice for the Scotland national cricket team as a right-handed batsman and right-arm fast-medium bowler. Hart was also a civil servant who served as the Financial Secretary of Singapore between 1954 and 1959.

== Biography ==
Born in Glasgow in 1909, Hart was educated at Glasgow Academy, Strathallan School, Glasgow University and Brasenose College, Oxford. In 1930, he played twice for Scotland in the Five Nations against Wales and Ireland at centre. Scotland beating Wales 12–9 at Murrayfield on 1 February and losing 14–11 to Ireland at Murrayfield on 22 February. In 1931 he played two games for Leicester Tigers.

Whilst attending Oxford University, Hart played for the university cricket team, playing ten first-class matches in 1931 and 1932, gaining his blue in both years. He made his debut for Scotland in 1933, playing against Ireland. He played a second match against Australia the following year. Both matches were first-class.

=== Civil service ===
Hart entered the Colonial Service in 1933 and was seconded to the Colonial Office between 1933 and 1936. He subsequently joined the Malayan Civil Service in 1936. Hart represented the Malaya cricket team in two matches, drawing against Sir Julien Cahn's XI in 1937 and losing to the Ceylonese cricket team in 1938. He also appeared in three matches for the Federated Malay States against the Straits Settlements between 1937 and 1939. During World War II, he was captured by the Japanese in Malaya and interned as a civilian detainee for the duration of the conflict.

Following the war, he was appointed Director of Commerce and Industry in Singapore in 1953, and the following year became the Financial Secretary to Singapore, serving under the cabinets of David Marshall from 1955 and subsequently Lim Yew Hock. The office of Financial Secretary was abolished after the 1959 Singaporean general election, when Singapore attained full internal self-government. It was replaced by the office of Minister of Finance, with Goh Keng Swee as his successor.

== Awards ==
Appointed a Companion of St Michael and St George, 1957.

== See also ==
- List of Scottish cricket and rugby union players
- 1930 Five Nations Championship
