= Bertie Perkins =

Welsh cricketer

Personal information
- Full name: Arthur Lionel Bertie Perkins
- Born: 19 October 1905; Swansea, Glamorgan, Wales
- Died: 6 May 1992 (aged 86); Durban, Natal, South Africa
- Batting: Right-handed
- Role: Batsman

Domestic team information
- Years: Team
- 1925–1933: Glamorgan
- FC debut: 1 August 1925 Glamorgan v HDG Leveson-Gower's XI
- Last FC: 21 June 1933 Glamorgan v Lancashire

Career statistics
Competition	First-class
Matches	6
Runs scored	102
Batting average	14.57
100s/50s	0/0
Top score	26*
Catches/stumpings	4/0
- Source: CricketArchive, 19 December 2007

Arthur Lionel Bertie Perkins (19 October 1905 – 6 May 1992), known as Bertie Perkins, was a Welsh cricketer. A right-handed batsman, he played first-class cricket for Glamorgan.

== Biography ==
Born in Swansea, after a good record in club cricket there, Bertie Perkins played two first-class matches for Glamorgan in 1925 against HDG Leveson-Gower's XI and Warwickshire. He then emigrated to Malaya where he went into business.

Whilst in Malaya, he played for the Straits Settlements against the Federated Malay States in Kuala Lumpur in 1932. Returning to Wales on a brief holiday in May/June 1933, he played four further first-class matches for Glamorgan, his last coming against Lancashire. He died in Durban, South Africa in 1992.
