= Fayer =

Fayer is a surname. Notable people with the surname include:

- Elsa Fayer (born 1974), French radio and television presenter
- Jane Fayer (born 1958), Puerto Rican swimmer
- Michael D. Fayer (born 1947), American chemical physicist
- Yuri Fayer (1890–1971), Soviet Jewish conductor

Fayer is occasionally used as a first name for both men and women.

== See also ==
- Fayed
