= James David Maxwell Smith =

British colonial administrator (1895–1969)

James David Maxwell Smith CMG
- Born: 25 January 1895; Scotland
- Died: 5 March 1969 (aged 74)
- Education: University of Aberdeen
- Occupation: Colonial administrator
- Children: 2

James David Maxwell Smith (25 January 1895 – 5 March 1969) was a British colonial administrator who was the Financial Secretary of Singapore from 1947 to 1951.

== Early life and education ==
Smith was born in Scotland on 25 January 1895, the son of James Smith, a clergyman. He was educated at Robert Gordon’s College, Aberdeen and University of Aberdeen where he received his MA in 1920. He served in the First World War in the Army and Royal Marines from 1914 until 1919.

== Career ==
Smith joined the Malay Civil Service in 1920 as a cadet and served in various posts in almost all parts of Malaya. In 1937, he was appointed Assistant Treasurer, Federated Malay States and State Treasurer of Selangor. In 1941, he served as Deputy Financial Secretary of the Straits Settlements while also holding the position of chairman of the War Insurance Board. In 1940, he was appointed Financial Commissioner to Johore. During the Second World War he was interned by the Japanese.

In 1947, he was appointed Financial Secretary of Singapore, serving in office until 1951. He prepared and presented to the Legislative Council for approval each year the budget of the colony. He was credited with the successful linkage of the financial operations of Malaya and Singapore when it was believed such coordination between the governments on economic and financial policies was essential to both their future development. He established the Joint Finance Committee and the Malayan Board of Income Tax. He was instrumental in returning financial stability to Singapore in the post-War period with one member stating in a tribute on his last day in the Legislative Council: "It is due to Mr. Smith's Aberdonial sagacity that our finances are in such a healthy state as to make us the envy of our neighbours". In 1950, he served as acting Colonial Secretary. He left office in 1951 upon reaching the retirement age of 55.

After leaving Malaya, Smith served as Salaries Commissioner, Mauritius (1951), and then with the U.N. Technical Assistance Administration in Nicaragua (1953–1955); Chile (1956–57); Brazil (1957–58), and Venezuela (1959–1961).

== Personal life and death ==
Smith married Katharine Miller in 1937 and they had a son and a daughter.

Smith died on 5 March 1969.

== Honours ==
Smith was appointed Companion of the Order of St Michael and St George (CMG) in the 1949 New Year Honours.
