= Charles Partridge Adams =

American painter (1858–1942)

Charles Partridge Adams (January 12, 1858 – October 14, 1942) was a largely self-taught American landscape artist who painted primarily in Colorado, and secondarily in California. Some paintings were also made in other Rocky Mountain states, the Pacific Northwest, and Canada, and a few in Louisiana, the East Coast, and Europe.

== Biography ==
Adams was born in Franklin, Massachusetts; his family moved to Denver in 1876. In 1877 he began worked as an engraver in Denver, and received lessons from Helen Henderson Chain, an artist who had studied with George Inness. In 1885 he traveled to the East Coast and visited the studios of George Inness and Worthington Whittredge, and in 1888 he traveled to California and visited the studios of William Keith and Thomas Hill. He traveled to Louisiana in 1890, and to Europe in the summer of 1914. He spent the winter of 1916 in California, and moved to Los Angeles in 1920, and built a second home in Laguna Beach in 1926. He died in Los Angeles.

== Art ==
Adams is known for his views of snowy mountain peaks in early morning or sunset light, or wreathed in storm clouds, and for his luminous sunset and twilight paintings of the river bottoms near Denver.

Most of Adams paintings are enhanced by the use of stronger colors than one would find in a photograph. The evening shadows are bluer, the spring grass is greener, the sunsets more strikingly yellow or orange. He sometimes used very small areas of intense blue and red to enliven a dark shadowed area such as the heart of a clump of willows or the dark base of an aspen tree. He also made the mountains look about twice as tall as they actually look, as if seen through a telephoto lens.

Some of his earlier paintings include animals or human figures, but later paintings do not include them.

Roughly half of Adams paintings are oils and half are watercolors, which he began painting in the early 1890s. Over 950 paintings have been documented.

== Selected works ==
- Mount Sopris - Watercolor c.1896
- Platte River Near Denver - Watercolor c.1900
- Early Morning in Autumn, Needle Mountains, Colorado - Oil on Board c.1920
- Pines and Boulders - Oil on Board c.1920
- Spanish Peaks Sunrise - Watercolor c.1920

== Bibliography ==
- Dines, Dorothy, Leonard, Stephen J., and Cuba, Stanley L. The Art of Charles Partridge Adams Fulcrum Publishing Co, Golden CO. Three substantial essays about Adams' life and work are illustrated with 92 full color plates. 146 pp.
