= Cyril Reed =

Indian cricketer (1906–1991)

Personal information
- Full name: Cyril Norman Reed
- Born: 10 July 1906; Poona, British India
- Died: 6 July 1991 (aged 84); Horsham, Sussex, England
- Role: Batsman

Domestic team information
- Years: Team
- 1928–1948: Europeans
- 1938: Madras
- FC debut: 4 December 1928 Europeans v Muslim
- Last FC: 11 January 1948 Europeans v Indians

Career statistics
Competition	First-class
Matches	10
Runs scored	555
Batting average	32.64
100s/50s	1/2
Top score	111*
Catches/stumpings	4/0
- Source: CricketArchive, 19 December 2007

Cyril Norman Reed (10 July 1906 – 6 July 1991) was an Indian born cricketer who in addition to playing ten first-class matches in India between 1928 and 1948, also played Minor counties cricket for Bedfordshire and international cricket for the Federated Malay States and the Straits Settlements.

== Biography ==
Born in Poona (now Pune), India, Cyril Reed's cricket career began in England, when he attended Bedford School and played for Bedfordshire in the Minor Counties Cricket Championship between 1924 and 1927. He also played for Bedfordshire against New Zealand in 1927.

In December 1928, he made his first-class debut when he played for the Europeans in the Bombay Quadrangular tournament. He played some more minor counties cricket for Bedfordshire in 1932, and played for the Federated Malay States against the Straits Settlements in 1933, scoring 218 in the first innings of the match, the highest score in the history of the fixture, which continues to this day as the Saudara Cup match between Malaysia and Singapore. In 1934 and 1935, he played for the Straits Settlements against the Federated Malay States.

He played one final season of minor counties cricket for Bedfordshire in 1936, before resuming his first-class career in India. He played in his first Madras Presidency Match in 1938, a year in which he also played for Madras cricket team against Lord Tennyson's XI. He played in the Madras Presidency match again in the following three years, as well as 1943, 1947, 1948, 1951 and 1952. The 1948 match was his final first-class appearance. He died in Horsham, Sussex, England in 1991.
