= Leslie Crockwell =

English cricketer

Personal information
- Full name: Leslie Horace William Crockwell
- Born: 1887; Newton Abbot, Devon, England
- Died: 29 April 1961 (aged 73–74); Williton, Somerset, England

Domestic team information
- Years: Team
- 1920/21: Europeans (India)
- 1908–1914: Devon

Career statistics
Competition	First-class
Matches	1
Runs scored	19
Batting average	9.50
100s/50s	–/–
Top score	19
Balls bowled	–
Wickets	–
Bowling average	–
5 wickets in innings	–
10 wickets in match	–
Best bowling	–
Catches/stumpings	–/–
- Source: ESPNcricinfo, 13 February 2011

Leslie Horace William Crockwell (1887 – 29 April 1961) was an English cricketer. He was born in Newton Abbot, Devon to auctioneer George and Louisa Crockwell.

Crockwell first played for Devon in the 1908 Minor Counties Championship against Carmarthenshire. From 1908 to 1914, he played infrequently for Devon, representing them in just 5 Championship matches. He played his final Championship match against Monmouthshire. Crockwell later made a single first-class appearance for the Europeans (India) against the Parsees in 1920. In the Europeans first-innings he scored 19 runs before being dismissed by M.B. Vatcha and in their second-innings he was dismissed for a duck by P.H. Daruwala.

He also played cricket for the Shanghai Cricket Club, playing two matches against Hong Kong in 1911 and 1912. Neither matches held first-class status.
