= Church of St Peter and St Paul, Bishop's Hull =

Church in Somerset, England

Church of St Peter and St Paul
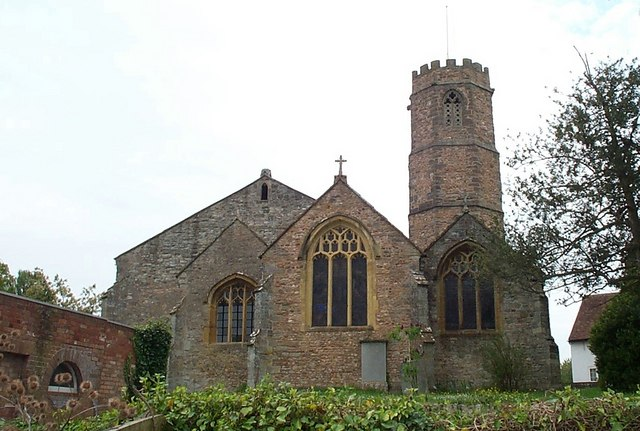

- Location within Somerset
- 51.0166°N 3.1350°W
- Location: Bishop's Hull, Somerset, England

History
- Built: 13th century

Listed Building – Grade II*
- Official name: Church of St Peter and St Paul
- Designated: 25 February 1955
- Reference no.: 1060537

The Church of St Peter and St Paul in Bishop's Hull, Somerset, England was built in the 13th century. It is a Grade II* listed building.

== History ==
Parts of the fabric of the current church including the lower stage of the tower remain from a 13th-century building. The higher parts of the tower are from the 14th century. The chancel and chapel were built in the 1530s. In 1827 and 1828 the nave was enlarged by Richard Carver. Galleries were added in the 19th century of which only the west gallery remains. Major rebuilding work was needed in the 1950s and 1960s due to subsidence.

The parish and benefice of Bishop's Hull is within the Diocese of Bath and Wells. The usual Sunday attendance is between 60 and 100 people.

== Architecture ==
The building is of Blue Lias and red sandstone with slate and asbestos roofs. The chancel and chapel are supported by diagonal buttresses. The four-stage tower is square at the base and octagonal above. The tower contains six bells, the earliest of which was cast around 1550 in Ash Priors.

Inside the church are monuments to the Farewell family and other notable parishioners from the 17th century.

== See also ==
- List of ecclesiastical parishes in the Diocese of Bath and Wells
