= Croom (disambiguation) =

Croom may refer to:

== Places ==
- Croom, County Limerick, a village in the Republic of Ireland
- Croom, Maryland, an unincorporated place in the United States of America
- Croom, New South Wales, a rural locality of Wollongong in Australia.

== People ==
- Croom (name)

== See also ==
- Croome (disambiguation)
