= Henry Talbot (cricketer) =

English cricketer

Personal information
- Full name: Henry Lynch Talbot
- Born: 2 October 1863; Greenwich, London, England
- Died: 1911; Perak, Federated Malay States
- Batting: Right-handed

Domestic team information
- Years: Team
- 1895: Marylebone Cricket Club (MCC)

Career statistics
Competition	First-class
Matches	1
Runs scored	9
Batting average	4.50
100s/50s	0/0
Top score	7
Balls bowled	0
Wickets	–
Bowling average	–
5 wickets in innings	–
10 wickets in match	–
Best bowling	–
Catches/stumpings	1/0
- Source: CricketArchive, 4 December 2007

Henry Lynch Talbot (2 October 1863 in Greenwich, London, UK – 1911 in Perak, Federated Malay States) was an English cricketer. A right-handed batsman, he played one first-class match for the Marylebone Cricket Club (MCC) in 1895, he also played for the Straits Settlements between 1891 and 1904, and for the Federated Malay States between 1906 and 1908.

Talbot was an officer in the Royal Marine Artillery, where he was a major in 1903.
