= HMS Croome =

HMS Croome refers to one of two Royal Navy ships named after the Croome fox-hunt. Croome is a hamlet in East Riding, Yorkshire.

- HMS Croome (1917) was a Hunt-class minesweeper launched in 1917 and sold in 1922.
- HMS Croome (L62) was a Hunt-class destroyer launched in 1941 and scrapped in 1957.
