= Edward Barrett (cricketer, born 1855) =

English cricketer

Personal information
- Full name: Edward Barrett
- Born: 1855; Farnham, Surrey, England
- Died: 19 January 1922 (aged 66–67); Bagshot, Surrey, England
- Batting: Unknown
- Bowling: Unknown
- Relatives: Edward Barrett junior (son)

Domestic team information
- Years: Team
- 1885: Hampshire

Career statistics
Competition	First-class
Matches	2
Runs scored	22
Batting average	11.00
100s/50s	–/–
Top score	13*
Balls bowled	48
Wickets	0
Bowling average	–
5 wickets in innings	–
10 wickets in match	–
Best bowling	–
Catches/stumpings	1/–
- Source: Cricinfo, 2 March 2010

Edward Barrett VD (1855 – 19 January 1922) was an English first-class cricketer, volunteer soldier, and brewer.

== Life ==
The son of the brewer Robert Barrett, he was born in Farnham in 1855. Barrett was commissioned as a sub-lieutenant in the 18th Surrey Volunteer Rifle Corps on 8 December 1875, with his promotion to lieutenant in March 1878 being antedated to the date he received his commission. By August 1882, he was volunteering in the 4th Surrey, gaining the rank of captain. Two years later he was volunteering with the 2nd Surrey, with Barrett gaining the rank of major in April 1888 and being appointed an aide-de-camp in September of the same year. In December 1895, he was granted the honorary rank of lieutenant colonel; the following month he was decorated with the Volunteer Officers' Decoration. He would command a local volunteer company and during the First World War he would volunteer as a transport officer, supervising the transit of troops to the Western Front.

In his youth, Barrett partook in both athletics and cricket in Farnham. A member of the Farnham United Cricket Club, he made two appearances in first-class cricket for Hampshire in 1885 against Surrey at The Oval, and Sussex at Hove. In these, he scored 22 runs with a highest score of 13 not out, while going wicketless with the ball.

Like his father, Barrett was also involved in brewing. In later life, he was the chairman of Farnham United Breweries. In his final years, he would reside in Sandbanks, Dorset. On 2 December 1921, Barrett was seriously injured when the vehicle he was travelling in collided with another near Bagshot. His wife, Ella, and their chauffeur were uninjured, however Barrett received a fractured skull, amongst other injuries. Despite an operation, he succumbed to his injuries at The Duchess of Connaught Memorial Nursing Home in Bagshot on 19 January 1922. He was cremated two days later at Farnham Cemetery. Aside from being survived by his wife, he was also survived by a son, Edward junior, who played first-class cricket and rugby union at international level.
