= William Iveson Croome =

Ecclesiastical archaeologist

William Iveson Croome, CBE, FSA, MA (1891-1967) was an archaeologist. A man of strong faith, he devoted much of his time and expertise to the care and conservation of ecclesiastical buildings.

== Early life ==
Croome was born on 23 November 1891 in North Cerney, Gloucestershire to parents Thomas Lancelot Croome and Mary Stewart Croome. His baptism took place a month later on 21 December 1891. William's father had been Rector at the nearby parish of Rendcomb. The family lived at Cerney House, a residence that had come into the Croome family in 1814. The property was inherited by William Iveson Croome, at the time a young child, on the death of his father in 1895. The property was eventually sold in 1930.

Croome served as Registrar of Wounded at the Second Southern General Hospital in the First World War. When the war ended Croome went to Oxford University, graduating with a Master of Arts.

== Work and interests ==
Croome trained as an archaeologist. He used his professional training and knowledge of ancient buildings to oversee the care of ecclesiastical buildings particularly in his home county of Gloucestershire. In his parish church, All Saints' at North Cerney, as well as holding the posts of churchwarden, altar server and sacristan, Croome took an active and professional interest in the maintenance of the church. Croome was a President of the Bristol and Gloucestershire Archaeological Society and was President of the Archaeological & Historical Society in Cirencester. The Croome Lectures, named in his honour, are an annual event in Cirencester and guest speakers have included Sir Nikolaus Pevsner and Sir Simon Jenkins.

Croome's wide interests led to a number of appointments to various ecclesiastical organisations. These included serving on diocesan advisory committees, local and national. He was a Vice Chair of the Council for the Care of Churches and Chair of the Cathedral Advisory Committee, a post he held until his death in 1967. Croome was active in the local community through his work as a magistrate. He served on the Cirencester Bench for 40 years and was its Chair Person for 20 years.

Photographs attributed to Croome are held in the Conway Library at The Courtauld Institute of Art, London. This collection comprises mostly architectural and sculptural images both ecclesiastical and secular. As part of the Courtauld Connects project this collection of images is currently being digitised.

Croome was chairman of Barnwood House Hospital from 1937 until his death in 1967. It was said in the Hospital's annual report of 19667 that 'his ability and energy were remarkable. There was exceptional activity during his twenty-nine years as chairman which included those of the second world war and the changes following it. This time was considered to be “the most difficult in the history of Barnwood House.'

Croome died in 1967; his death registered in April of that year in Cirencester. Probate records note that he lived at Barton Mill House, Cirencester at the time of his death.

== Honours ==
William Iveson Croome was awarded a CBE for public services in Gloucestershire in the 1957 New Year Honours.

== Publications ==
- John Stuart Sinclair and William Iveson Croome, The Story of Cirencester Parish Church, 1969, British Publishing Company. ISBN 9780714000695
