= Honor Croome =

English writer (1908-1960)

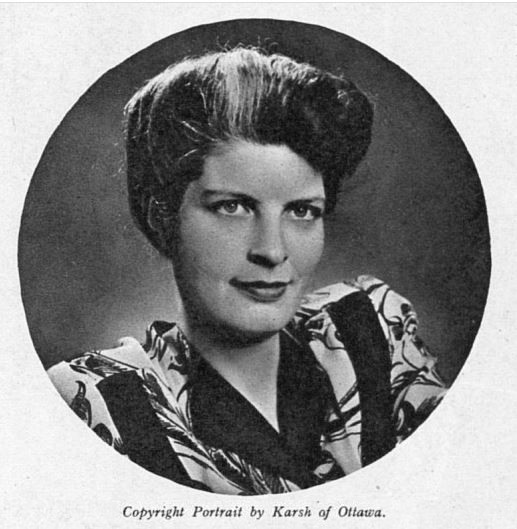
- Portrait of Croome by Yousuf Karsh
- Born: Honoria Renée Minturn Scott; July 6, 1908; Sevenoaks, Kent, England
- Died: September 29, 1960 (aged 52); London, England
- Occupation: Writer
- Spouse: John Lewis Croome (1907-2008)
- Parent(s): Arthur Hugh Scott; Mildred Minturn Scott

Honor Renée Minturn Croome (6 July 1908 – 29 September 1960) was an English writer, novelist and author of The Economy of Britain: A History.

== Life ==
Honor Croome was born on 6 July 1908 as Honoria Renée Minturn Scott in Sevenoaks, Kent. Her father, Arthur Hugh Scott, was a schoolmaster and her mother, Mildred Minturn Scott, was a graduate of Bryn Mawr College, where she became a close friend of Frances Fincke, later wife of the famed judge Learned Hand. Mildred Minturn's translation of Jean Jaurès' Studies in Socialism was published shortly before she married Arthur Scott in 1906.

Croome began her schooling at l’École de l’Île-de-France, a French boarding school run on the model of an English public school at which her father taught. She attended a girls' school in Switzerland (an experience she used as the basis for her novel, The Mountain and the Molehill), the Hayes Court School in Kent, Bryn Mawr College, the Sorbonne in Paris, and finally the London School of Economics (LSE). While at the LSE, she studied under Lionel Robbins and became acquainted with the work of Friedrich Hayek.

After graduating from the LSE, Croome wrote her first book, The Approach to Economics and assisted Nicholas Kaldor in the translation of Hayek's Monetary Theory and the Trade Cycle into English. She then worked at the New Fabian Research Bureau, an organization involved in statistics and planning – probably the inspiration for the Housing Plan organization she later described in her second novel You’ve Gone Astray.

In 1930 she was sent to Egypt by her father "to forget about Lewis", this being John Lewis Croome (1907–2008), known as 'Lewis' and who had been a year ahead of her at the LSE. Despite her father's efforts they married in 1931, and in 1933, the couple purchased land in Claygate, Surrey, on which they built their home, known as Pearmain. In 1935, Honor Croome became the political secretary to Lady Astor, then Conservative MP for Plymouth Sutton. She wrote in the Bryn Mawr Alumnae Bulletin that the job was “tremendous fun” but also tiring: “I am rapidly going grey and can hear imaginary typewriters and telephones in my dreams.” A year later, she wrote that she left the post “owing to (a) nervous exhaustion and (b) incompetence” and “returned to the fleshpots and to society of son [John Croome] and heir aged 2½.” “Very nice, too,” she added.

Croome wrote articles and reviews for The New Statesman and Nation until 1937, when she became a regular contributor to The Spectator. She gave birth to a daughter, Ursula, in 1936 and wrote her classmates at Bryn Mawr that she was busy with a family “to cook for, a job to hold down, and a book to see through the press.” The book she referred to was The Economy of Britain: A History, published in 1938.

In July 1940, Croome sailed with son John and daughter Ursula to Canada. She gave birth to her son Gilbert soon after arrival. She and the children spent a year living as refugees in Westwood, Massachusetts, outside Boston. In 1941, Lewis Croome was appointed as head of the British Food Mission to Canada and the family settled in Ottawa, where they remained until 1946. While in Ottawa, Honor Croome wrote her first two novels, O Western Wind and You've Gone Astray, and gave birth to two more sons, David and Geoffrey.

The Croomes returned to England in April 1946 and Honor resumed her work as an economist and journalist while continuing to write and raise her children. She resumed her work as a reviewer and opinion writer for The Spectator, published her third novel, The Faithless Mirror in 1946 and began publishing articles on domestic matters in magazines such as Homes & Garden. She published two more novels in the 1950s: The Mountain and the Molehill (1955) and The Forgotten Place (1957). She also published three economics texts: The Candidate's Companion (1947); The Livelihood of Man (with Gordon King) (1953); and Introduction to Money (1956).

Croome did not believe that feminism was incompatible with domesticity. "A woman should have a proper appreciation of the extent to which family life was in itself a career," she once wrote. She also argued, however, that men should also take a hand in housekeeping: "Just possibly the compulsory Jill-of-all-trades, coming as best she can to terms with the feminist dilemma, may be learning an attitude to life which the masculine half of society could also, mutatis mutandis, adopt with profit."

When Croome died in 1960, The Economist made an exception of its practice of being “anonymous by conviction as well as by tradition” and printed a black-boxed notice of her death. “To those who knew her,” the editors wrote, “every piece she wrote could only be hers; to those who did not, her reviews were no less identifiable, running like a strong shining thread through these pages. The style was the woman.” In The Economics Journal, she was described as "an indefatigable writer and reviewer" with "a firmly established place in the economic thinking of her generation."

== Work ==
Croome's first book The Approach to Economics was credited to H. M. Scott in its first edition. In his introduction to the book, Sir Josiah Stamp not only applauded its clarity but hinted that it "might well be read on the sly by many business men and others in high places, with advantage to the community." Intended as a text for grammar school students, it was reprinted numerous times, becoming, in the words of The Economic Journal, "for many generations of students their first elementary introduction to the subject."

The Economy of Britain: A History (1938), a collaboration with the historian Richard James Hammond, was designed as an introductory text. Hammond wrote the chapters covering the period through the Victorian age and Croome dealt with modern developments. Reviewing the book for The Spectator, M. M. Postan wrote that it "successfully manages to pake the whole of English economic history into one small and attractive volume." Dorothy Marshall called it "a stimulating narrative, clearly and even excitingly presented" and "a very happy example" of what the cooperation of economist and economic historian can achieve.

Croome's first two novels drew heavily from her own experiences. In O Western Wind (1943), she followed four women and their children from their departure as refugees from Liverpool through the challenges of their first year in the United States. Elizabeth Bowen judged it "a brilliantly-told story": "What she touches, lives. When she writes about ships, I feel seasick...." Her only book to be published in the US, it received mixed reviews in American magazines. Writing in the New York Times, Nona Balakian found it "unusually well-constructed" but "photographically conceived, written without grace or much imaginative penetration."

You've Gone Astray (1944) follows two friends from the early 1930s into the first year of the war. Kitty is a lively and attractive writer of romantic novels, while Linda is closer to Croome herself, working for a social reform organization while caring for a daughter and keeping a house. Croome captured the hectic strain of such commitments: “She had to turn dislocating psychological somersaults, morning and evening, Saturday and Monday, switching from the role of expert and organizer to that of suburban housewife and back again.” Elizabeth Bowen found the book "wise and lively: it also contains a message for the innumerable Lindas of this world." Writing in The Sketch, L. P. Hartley was impressed with the novelist's skill in characterization and narrative. The story, he said, had "a denouement that satisfies one's aesthetic sense: yet it is not inevitable. We are left with the feeling that so great is Mrs. Croome's cleverness, so sure her touch on the strings, as well as the heart-strings, of the story, that she could have made it end any way she liked."

Her third novel, The Faithless Mirror (1946), was set in Canada and told the story of the complicated relationship between a brother and sister. Reviewing the book for The Spectator, Kate O'Brien wrote that "Mrs. Croome knows her ground here, and gives life to this story of wartime Ottawa and of her heroine's struggle to find her rightful place in it. The book is living, straightforward and true."

Croome's fourth novel, The Mountain and the Molehill (1955), told of the success and failure of a girls' school in Switzerland and its charismatic founder. Reviewer Kenneth Young found it "a finely constructed, well written story of a strong and fascinating head mistress, Marie Bossier, whose school finally collapses through the very strength and praise-worthiness of the ideas behind it." In The New Statesman & Nation, Walter Allen was, like Hartley, impressed by Croome's ability: "Mrs. Croome handles her plot with great skill, but what most impresses is her sense of fairness to her characters: all are seen in the round and with fidelity and freshness. She is truly compassionate. If only she would write novels more often!" And in The Observer, John Davenport wrote, "How refreshing it is to read a novel that radiates intelligence."

In her last novel, The Forgotten Place (1957), a woman returns to her late mother's country house in search of the source of her unhappy childhood and finds it cut up into a communal system of flats. In The Sphere, Vernon Fane wrote that the story would be "thoroughly depressing if — and it is an essential 'if' — it were not for the creativeness of the author's talent, and the tenderness with which she very obviously regards human beings."

Croome wrote three more introductory books on economics in the 1950s. The Candidate's Companion was intended for use by examinees in elementary economics. Professor Bill Miller later said that the book "got more people through exams on economics than Mill, Marshall, and Keynes put together." The Livelihood of Man was designed for grammar school readers and those new to economics. Economica's reviewer wrote that "there is much to commend the book as a complement to the teaching in the spheres for which it is designed." The Economist's reviewer found that Introduction to Money combined "some of the best qualities of both teaching and journalism. She has the teacher's instinct for what must come first in the understanding of a subject; and she combines it with the journalist's ability to spell out the essentials as slowly as need be, yet keeping the argument moving by lively illustration and colloquial phrase."

== Books ==
=== Economics ===
- The Approach to Economics (1931)
- The Economy of Britain: A History (with Richard James Hammond ) (1938; revised as An Economic History of Britain in 1947)
- The Candidate's Companion: A Guidebook for Examiners in Elementary Economics (1947)
- The Livelihood of Man: Economics in Theory and Practice (with Gordon King) (1953)
- Introduction to Money (1956; revised by John M. Croome in 1962)

=== Novels ===
- O Western Wind (1943)
- You've Gone Astray (1944)
- The Faithless Mirror (1946)
- The Mountain and the Molehill (1955)
- The Forgotten Place (1957)
