= Percival Healing =

English cricketer

Percival Healing (16 July 1878 – 1 February 1915) was an English cricketer. He was a right-handed batsman who played for Gloucestershire. He was born in Tewkesbury and died in Marylebone.

Healing made a single first-class appearance, during the 1911 season, against the touring Indians. Batting in the lower order, he scored 30 runs in the first innings in which he batted, and 8 runs in the second.
