= Arthur Croome =

English cricketer

Personal information
- Born: 21 February 1866; Stroud, Gloucestershire
- Died: 11 September 1930 (aged 64); Taplow, Berkshire
- Batting: Right-handed

Domestic team information
- Years: Team
- 1885–1892: Gloucestershire
- 1887–1889: Oxford University
- Source: Cricinfo, 1 April 2014

Arthur Capel Molyneux Croome (21 February 1866 – 11 September 1930) was an English cricketer. He was educated at Wellington College and Magdalen College, Oxford. He played cricket for Gloucestershire between 1885 and 1892. He became a schoolteacher and taught at Radley College 1889–1910. He was Tutor of F Social from 1902-1910.

Croome was also a hurdler and ran for Oxford for four years. He was one of the pioneers of the "straight-lead-leg" hurdling technique. Croome was an all-round sportsman winning 4 "blues". While teaching at Radley he took up golf and was one of the founders of the Oxford and Cambridge Golfing Society. He wrote weekly articles on golf for the Evening Standard and the Morning Post. After leaving Radley he moved to London and wrote on cricket for The Times. Croome was also employed at the Daily Telegraph after leaving Radley.

His son Victor played cricket for the Royal Air Force cricket team.

Croome's cricket career was interrupted owing to serious injury according to his Wisden obituary: whilst fielding for Gloucestershire against Lancashire at Manchester in 1887, he impaled himself on the railings; one of the points entered his neck, and for some time his life hung in the balance, but after a severe illness he regained his health.

Croome was the first Secretary of the newly formed Oxford and Cambridge Golf Society (1898). His nickname was "Crumbo". Croome was a member of the Royal North Devon Golf Club and represented the club when competing for the Amateur Championship, at his home course in 1912, reaching the fifth round. Croome became a partner in the golf course architect firm, Fowler, Abercrombie, Simpson and Croome. Croome was also a member of Rye Golf Club, becoming Captain of the club. In 1922, Croome was invited to design the course for the Liphook Golf Club, the only course he was to design.
