= Helen Henderson Chain =

American artist and mountaineer (1849–1892)

- Born: July 31, 1849; Indianapolis, Indiana
- Died: October 10, 1892 (aged 43)
- Known for: Artist, mountaineer, humanitarian

Helen Henderson Chain (July 31, 1849 – October 10, 1892) was an American artist and mountaineer. The majority of her work focused on landscapes in the American West. She has been called the first resident female artist in Colorado.

== Early life ==
Helen Henderson was born to George Henry Porter and Sarah Maria (Bacon) Henderson in Indianapolis, Indiana in 1849. The family moved to Antioch, California, when Helen was young. When Helen's mother died in 1862, she moved back to Indianapolis to reside with an aunt. Helen stayed in the Midwest through her formal education, attending Methodist College and graduating from Illinois Female College (present-day MacMurry College) in 1869. She received some formal art training as a part of her education. She married James Albert Chain in 1871, and the couple moved to Colorado.

== Life in Colorado ==
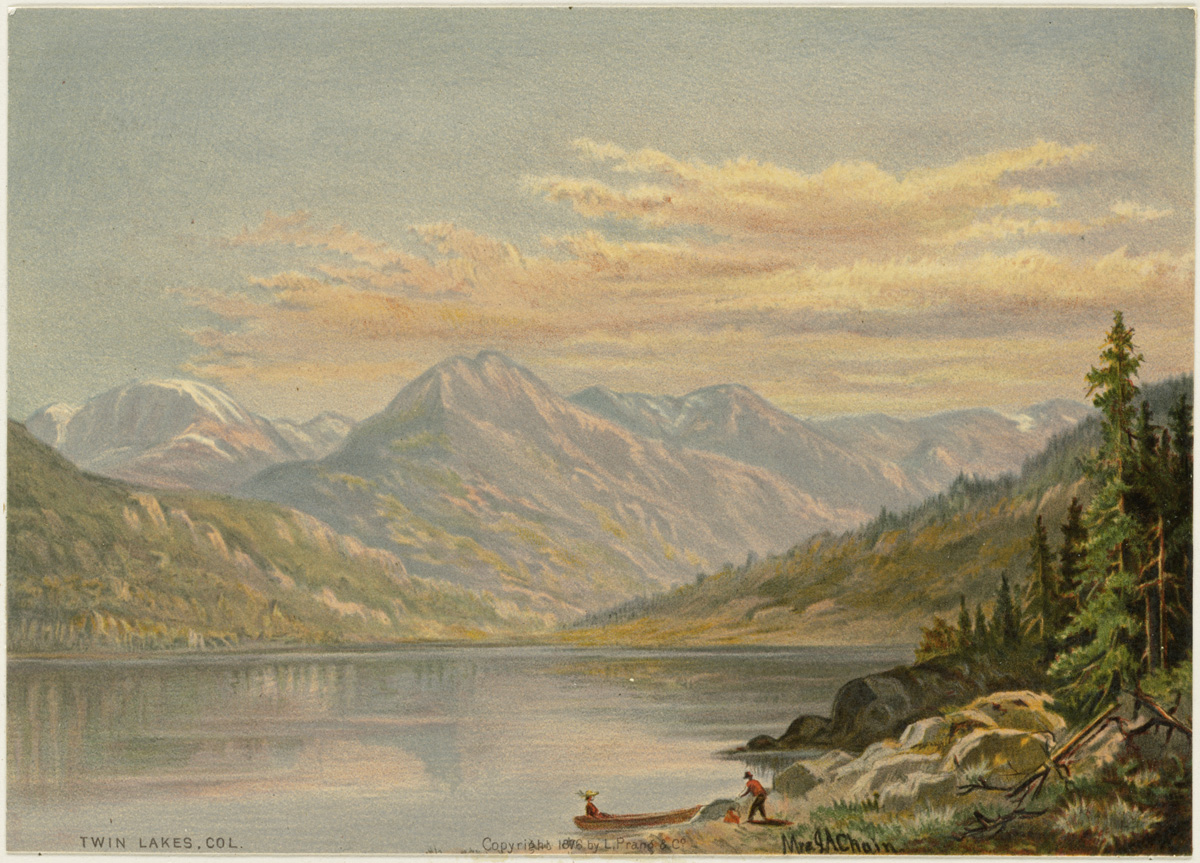
Twin Lakes, Colorado, By Helen Chain

In Denver, James Chain established a book and stationery store that also sold art supplies. Helen used part of the space as her studio and also taught art students, including famous Rocky Mountain landscape painter Charles Partridge Adams. She continued to study art as well. Among her mentors were Hamilton Hamilton and Hudson River School painter George Inness. Chain was inspired by the outdoors and preferred to do her sketches on location, which often meant climbing mountains, such as Pikes Peak, Grey's Peak, and Long's Peak. She was the first woman to climb the Mount of the Holy Cross, which she did in 1877.

The Chains traveled throughout the West, including trips to Arizona, New Mexico, and California and famous landmarks like the Grand Canyon, Yosemite, and Yellowstone. Chain is reported to be the first woman to have painted the Grand Canyon. On these trips they were accompanied by famous artists such as Thomas Moran and William Henry Jackson. Chain was the first woman to exhibit at New York's National Academy of Design, where two of her paintings of New Mexico Pueblos were shown in 1882. Margaret Tobin Brown owned one of her works, which can be seen at the Molly Brown House Museum today.

Chain was also noted for being a humanitarian. After anti-Chinese riots in Denver in 1880, she began to use the storefront of the Chains' bookstore to teach English to Chinese immigrants.

== Death ==
The Chains embarked on a global tour in March 1892. While in Japan, Chain sent home art in Japanese style back to the Denver Fortnightly Club. On October 10, 1892, they were crossing the South China Sea between Shanghai and Hong Kong when their steamship sank during a typhoon. The Chains both drowned, along with the other passengers on board their ship, SS Bokhara.

== Works ==
=== Select paintings ===
The following paintings are listed in Kovinick and Yoshiki-Kovinick:

- Burros on the Trail
- Pikes Peak
- Twin Lakes near Leadville
- Royal Gorge on the Arkansas River
- Sierra Blanca
- Source of the Platte
- Rapid Transit
- New Mexico
- Struck It Rich
- Camping in the Rocky Mountains
- Santa Clara Plaza
- Pueblo de Taos
- Morning in the Pueblo Indian Village
- Mount of the Holy Cross (1879)

=== Other works ===
- Snow-Shoe Itinerant by John L. Dyer (1891), (illustrator)

=== Exhibitions ===
- National Mining Exhibition (1883) - Denver, CO
- National Academy of Design (1882) - New York City, NY
- Denver Paint and Clay Show (1889) - Denver, CO
- Denver Art League (1892) - Denver, CO
- Minneapolis Industrial Exposition (1892) - Minneapolis, MN
