= Walter Parsons (cricketer) =

English cricketer

Personal information
- Full name: Walter Dyett Parsons
- Born: 26 June 1861; Southampton, Hampshire, England
- Died: 24 December 1939 (aged 78); East Wellow, Hampshire, England

Domestic team information
- Years: Team
- 1882: Hampshire

Career statistics
Competition	First-class
Matches	2
Runs scored	31
Batting average	15.50
100s/50s	0/0
Top score	12*
Balls bowled	124
Wickets	1
Bowling average	72.00
5 wickets in innings	0
10 wickets in match	0
Best bowling	1/23
Catches/stumpings	1/–
- Source: Cricinfo, 4 December 2007

Walter Dyett Parsons (26 June 1861 – 24 December 1939) was an English first-class cricketer.

Parsons was born in Southampton in June 1861. He made two appearances in first-class cricket for Hampshire in 1882, against Sussex at Hove and Somerset at Taunton. In these, he scored 31 runs and took and a single wicket. He later played minor cricket matches in the Far East for the Straits Settlements against Hong Kong in November 1904. Parsons died on Christmas Eve in 1939 at East Wellow, Hampshire.
