= Edward Barrett (English sportsman) =

English sportsman and soldier (1879–1950)

Personal information
- Full name: Edward Ivo Medhurst Barrett
- Born: 22 June 1879; Churt, Surrey, England
- Died: 10 July 1950 (aged 71); Boscombe, Hampshire, England
- Batting: Right-handed
- Bowling: Unknown
- Relatives: Edward Barrett senior (father)

Domestic team information
- Years: Team
- 1896–1925: Hampshire
- 1903–1920: Marylebone Cricket Club

Career statistics
Competition	First-class
Matches	86
Runs scored	3,804
Batting average	32.23
100s/50s	6/20
Top score	215
Balls bowled	32
Wickets	0
Bowling average	–
5 wickets in innings	–
10 wickets in match	–
Best bowling	–
Catches/stumpings	36/–
- Source: Edward Barrett at Cricinfo; 4 December 2007

Rugby union career
- Position: Centre
Senior career
Years	Team	Apps	(Points)
	Lennox FC	?	(?)
International career
Years	Team	Apps	(Points)
1903	England	1	(0)

Edward Ivo Medhurst Barrett CIE (22 June 1879 – 10 July 1950) was an English first-class cricketer, rugby union international, British Army officer, and colonial police officer.

His military career began in 1899 with the Lancashire Fusiliers, with Barrett serving in the Second Boer War. He later transferred to the colonial police in British Malaya, before joining the Shanghai Municipal Police. He rose to become its commissioner between 1925 and 1929. As a sportsman, he played first-class cricket, mainly for Hampshire between 1896 and 1912, with additional matches in 1920 and 1925. In rugby union, he was capped at Test level by England in 1903, while in golf he was the Japanese amateur champion in 1917.

== Early life and service career ==
The son of the cricketer Edward Barrett senior, he was born at Churt in June 1879. He was educated at Cheltenham College, where he played for and captained the college cricket team, having moderate success in inter-school matches. From there, he attended the Royal Military College at Sandhurst, graduating into the Lancashire Fusiliers as a second lieutenant in February 1899. Shortly after gaining his commission, he served in South Africa in the Second Boer War, including as part of the Ladysmith Relief Force, and was slightly wounded at the engagement at Venters Spruit on 20 January 1900, when he had to take the responsibility as lieutenant, promotion to which was later antedated to the same day. For his participation in the conflict, he gained the King's South Africa Medal.

The battalion stayed in South Africa throughout the war, which formally ended in June 1902 after the Peace of Vereeniging. Barrett joined other officers and men of the battalion who left Cape Town on the SS Britannic in October that year, and was stationed at Aldershot upon his return. He was promoted to captain in May 1903, and was seconded as a wing officer to the Malay States Guides the following month. Barrett joined the Shanghai Municipal Police in 1907, which was responsible for policing the Shanghai International Settlement and headed the Sikh Branch for many years. He was made a CIE in the 1919 Birthday Honours. He replaced K.J. McEuen as commissioner of police in Shanghai in 1925, with McEuen having been held partly responsible for The Nanjing Road Incident of May 1925, which resulted in the deaths of protesters and subsequently led to civil unrest.

Barrett was himself forced to resign on 1 October 1929, after disputes about police effectiveness and reform. He was later added to the Special List during the Second World War.

== Sporting career ==
=== Cricket ===
Barrett made his debut in first-class cricket for Hampshire against Warwickshire at Southampton in the 1896 County Championship, with him playing in two further matches against Essex and Leicestershire that season. He made a further five appearances in the 1897 County Championship, followed by seven appearances in the 1898 County Championship. While attending Sandhurst, he established himself in the college team, but his form was disappointing. The Second Boer War would interfere with his first-class cricket commitments, with Barrett not appearing again for Hampshire until the 1901 County Championship, when he made six appearances and scored his maiden century (111) against Sussex. He did not feature for Hampshire in 1902, but did return to play two matches in the 1903 County Championship, alongside a first-class appearance for the Marylebone Cricket Club that season against Kent at Lord's.

By this point, his career with the colonial police force was beginning to affect his availability for Hampshire, even more so when he was posted in the Far East, where he played cricket for the Straits Settlements and Federated Malay States, and later fourteen matches for the Shanghai cricket team, the last coming as late as 1927. Despite his commitments in the colonial police in British Malaya, he still managed to play for Hampshire in the 1906 County Championship, making six appearances. A gap of six years passed before he next appeared in first-class cricket, playing a full season in 1912 when he made 32 appearances, which included appearances for the MCC against Yorkshire, the South against the touring Australians, the Gentlemen of England against the touring South Africans, and for The Rest of England against Yorkshire. In 1912, he passed 1,000 runs in a season for the first time, with 1,381 runs at an average of 40.61; he made three of his six career centuries in 1912.

Barrett did not play for Hampshire until after the First World War, when he appeared in nineteen matches for Hampshire in the 1920 County Championship, alongside one match for the MCC against Nottinghamshire. He again passed 1,000 runs for the season, with 1,054 runs at an average of 28.24; he made two centuries, including a double-century (215) against Gloucestershire at Southampton, when he shared in a partnership of 321 for the second wicket with George Brown. He made one further first-class appearance for Hampshire, in the 1925 County Championship against Worcestershire at Bournemouth. In eighty first-class appearances for Hampshire, he scored 3,518 runs at an average of 32.57, making seventeen half centuries alongside his six centuries. He was considered one of the finest and hardest hitters of his day, exhibiting a sound defence and good timing.

=== Rugby union ===
Despite being injured during the Second Boer War, Barrett returned from the war and played rugby union for the England in the 1903 Home Nations Championship, playing one Test match against Scotland at Richmond. He played his club rugby for Lennox.

=== Golf ===
A keen golfer, Barrett won the Japan Amateur Golf Championship in 1917.

== Death ==
Barrett died as a result of a bicycling accident on 10 July 1950, at Boscombe, Hampshire. He was predeceased by his first wife, Winifred, with whom he had two children. Following her death, he married Katherine Craven in 1928, with her surviving him.
