= Fayed =

Fayed (Arabic: فايد), or Al-Fayed with the definite article al- (Arabic: الفايد), is a surname. Notable people with the surname include:

- Mohamed Al-Fayed (1929–2023), Egyptian business magnate
  - Dodi Fayed (1955–1997), his son, died with Diana, Princess of Wales
- Guillermo Fayed (born 1985), French World Cup alpine ski racer and soldier
- Omar Fayed, environmentalist and publisher

Places with this name include:

- Fayed, a city in Egypt
