= Malaya cricket team =

The Malaya cricket team represented the combined territories of the Federated Malay States and the Straits Settlements in cricket matches between 1906 and 1961.

== History ==
=== Early days ===
Cricket has been played in Peninsular Malaysia since at least the 1850s. The first match between the Federated Malay States and Straits Settlements was played in 1905 and the combined Malaya team first played the following year, against Burma in Yangon, though the result is not known. Two matches were played against Australia in 1909.

Beginning in 1920, Malaya replaced the Straits Settlements in a regular series of Interport matches against Hong Kong. In November of that year, they traveled to Hong Kong, playing matches against Hong Kong and Shanghai. They beat Hong Kong by 35 runs, but lost to Shanghai by an innings and 140 runs. Following these two matches, they joined forces with the Shanghai team but lost to Hong Kong by five wickets. The visit was repeated in November 1924, with Malaya losing to Shanghai by 89 runs and to Hong Kong by 2 wickets. They played Hong Kong at home in 1926, beating them by an innings and 112 runs on the Padang in Singapore.

In June 1927, Australia, captained by Bert Oldfield, visited Malaya, and the Malayan side won the first match by 39 runs, their only win against a Test-playing nation. A third visit to Hong Kong was made in November that year, with Malaya losing by an innings to Shanghai and Hong Kong. In 1929, they lost to Shanghai by 1 wicket, and to Hong Kong by four wickets. The final visit in 1933 saw Malaya beat Hong Kong by 14 runs, before gaining their first win over Shanghai by beating them by 50 runs.

=== Later matches ===
Little is known of Malaya's matches after World War II. The two results that are known are that Malaya beat Hong Kong by 1 wicket in a fixture in December 1959, and drew with the MCC in March 1961.

== Players ==
The following players played for Malaya and also played first-class cricket:

- Gerald Livock - played for Middlesex from 1925 to 1927.
- Robert Phayre - played for the Europeans in India in 1928/29.
- Alfred Hill - played for Warwickshire in 1920.
- Edward Armitage - played for Hampshire between 1919 and 1925.
- Neville Foster - played for Worcestershire between 1914 and 1923.
- Charles Congdon - played for the Royal Navy between 1921 and 1929.
- Robert Braddell - played for Oxford University and the MCC between 1908 and 1911.
- Herbert Hopkins - played for Worcestershire between 1921 and 1931.
- Lall Singh - played Test cricket for India in 1932.
- William Smith - played for Scotland in 1927.
- Victor Croome - played for the Royal Air Force from 1928 to 1930.
- Thomas Hart - played for Oxford University and Scotland between 1931 and 1934. Hart also played twice for the Scotland rugby union team in 1930.

== See also ==
- Federated Malay States cricket team
- Straits Settlements cricket team
- Malaysia national cricket team
- Singapore national cricket team
