= Shanghai Cricket Club =

The Shanghai Cricket Club is a cricket club based in Shanghai, China. The club dates back to 1858 when the first recorded cricket match was played between a team of British naval officers and a Shanghai XI. The original Shanghai Cricket Club ceased activities in 1948.

Following a 45-year dormancy after the founding of the People's Republic of China in 1949, a new Shanghai Cricket Club (with a different Chinese name) was established in 1994 by expatriates living in the city and has since grown to over 300 members.

== History ==
=== Before 1949 ===
Shanghai Cricket Club
- Traditional Chinese: 上海拍球總會
- Simplified Chinese: 上海拍球总会
Transcriptions
Standard Mandarin
- Hanyu Pinyin: Shànghǎi Pāiqiú Zǒnghuì

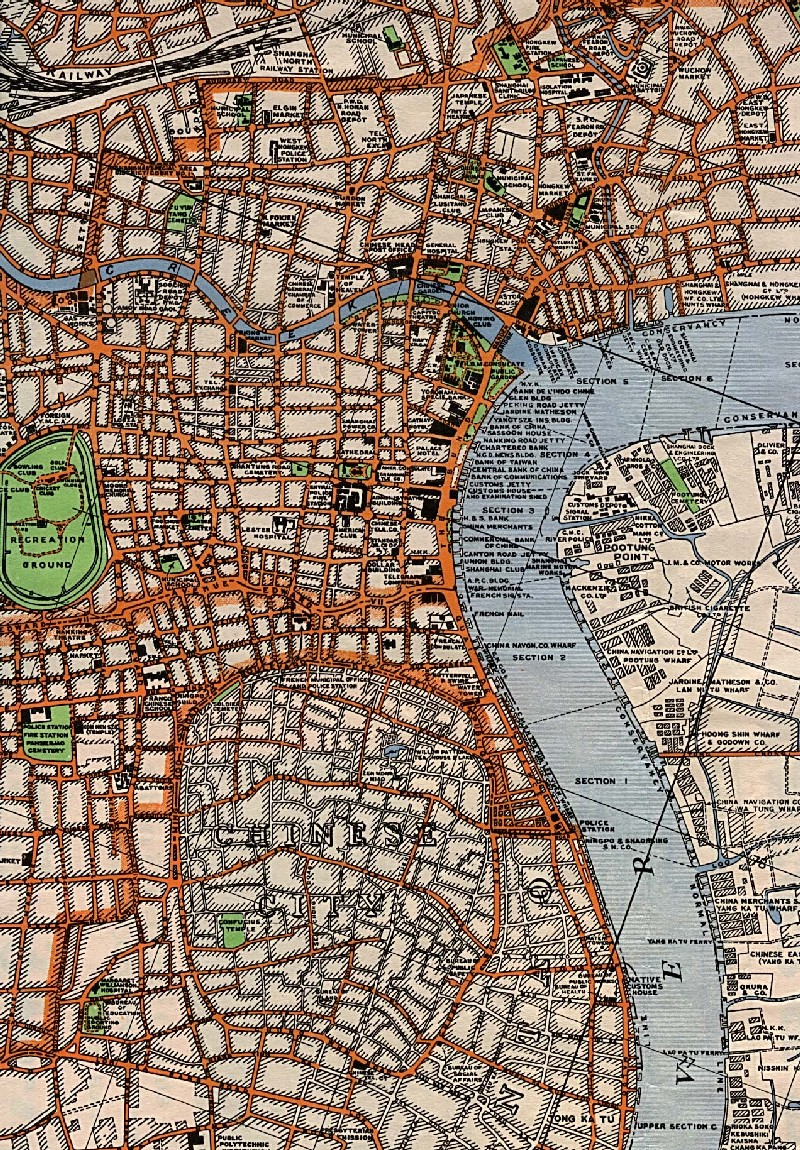
Shanghai map from 1933, the ground in the racecourse is shown on the left in green.

The first recorded cricket match in Shanghai was played somewhere in Hongkou on April 22, 1858, between a team of officers from HMS Highflyer and a Shanghai XI in 1858. Since then cricket has had a home in Shanghai.

In 1863, the first true cricket ground was bought by the Shanghai Recreation Fund from the Race Club. The ground was located inside the Shanghai Race Club racecourse, located in present-day People's Square and People's Park on the corner of Nanjing Road and Jiangxi Road.

Interport matches with the Hong Kong Cricket Club and the Singapore Cricket Club began in 1866 as a series of home-and-away fixtures which continued up until 1948, just prior to the PLA takeover of Shanghai. It was after the conclusion of one of these series that the Hong Kong team, returning from Shanghai was struck by tragedy as the SS Bokhara, the ship that was transporting them back to Hong Kong, sank on October 10, 1892, off the coast of Formosa. Of the 13 Hong Kong cricketers on board, only two survived. The clubs continued to play Interport matches and today, the winner of a series is given the Bokhara Bell Memorial Trophy.

=== Reincarnation ===
Shanghai Cricket Club
- Traditional Chinese: 上海板球俱樂部
- Simplified Chinese: 上海板球俱乐部
Transcriptions
Standard Mandarin
- Hanyu Pinyin: Shànghǎi Bǎnqiú Jùlèbù

The Shanghai Cricket Club was reestablished in 1994, under the same English name as the original club but a different Chinese name. In 2004, an inter-club league was established by the four SCC member clubs: Bashers CC, DPR Hot Dogs, Maharajas (now Daredevils) and Pudong CC. The club hosted the Shanghai International Sixes from 1997 through 2009. During this time, a women's side (currently defunct) also existed called the Pearls.

The club has two representative teams, the Dragons and the Pirates. Drawn from the best cricket players in the city, the Dragons regularly tour throughout Asia and host international teams in Shanghai. The Dragons have also participated in most of the major tournaments on the Asian Cricket Sixes Tour, winning in Hong Kong, Manila and Phuket. The Pirates were created in 2005 for the Hong Kong Cricket Sixes Festival, and are composed of representatives of all seven member clubs and associate teams in Shanghai. They regularly join the Dragons on tours throughout Asia, focusing heavily on social activities and touring.

The Shanghai Cricket Club plays regular matches with the Hong Kong Cricket Club, Kowloon Cricket Club, Lamma Cricket Club, and the Beijing Cricket Club. In addition, the club plays semi-regular fixtures against Centaurs Cricket Club, Singapore Cricket Club, and Kai Tak Cricket Club and has hosted many international touring sides including Marylebone Cricket Club. The Shanghai Cricket Club was also the first club to play organized cricket in North Korea, competing for the Pyongyang Friendship Trophy in 2008.

The SCC currently plays at grounds in Waigaoqiao, Pudong, and at Wellington College International.

== SCC League ==
=== League Structure ===
The Shanghai Cricket Club runs a three division league. The league is made up of the four foundation clubs (Bashers CC, Daredevils CC, DPR Hot Dogs, Pudong CC) as well as four associate teams: K2 CCC, China Zalmi CC, Dulwich Knights and Charminar Cheetahs CC. League matches are played on Sundays from April through September and feature limited overs cricket. Division 1: 40 overs; Division 2: 30 overs; Division 3: 25 overs.

=== Clubs and Associate Teams ===
- Bashers Cricket Club
- Daredevils Cricket Club
- DPR Hot Dogs Cricket Club
- Pudong Cricket Club
- Dulwich Knights (International School Associate Club)
- K2 China Cricket Club
- China Zalmi Cricket Club (Formerly Leopards CC)
