= Shanghai cricket team =

Cricket team

The Shanghai cricket team was a cricket team that played various international matches between 1866 and 1948. The team was organised by the Shanghai Cricket Club. With cricket in the rest of China almost non-existent, for that period they were the de facto Chinese national side.

== History ==
The first recorded match in Shanghai took place in April 1858. The Shanghai team travelled to Hong Kong in 1866 to play against the Hong Kong cricket team, the first in a series of Interport matches that lasted until 1948. In 1893, occasional matches against Kobe, Yokohama and Hangzhou began.

Home matches were played on the grounds encircled by the racecourse of the Shanghai Race Club (today People's Square and People's Park). In addition to the matches mentioned in the previous paragraph, regular matches were also played against the Straits Settlements and Malaya.

Following the last match against Hong Kong in 1948, political unrest meant that the cricket playing community dwindled, and cricket disappeared for around thirty years.

The government has invested in the sport since China became, in 2004, an affiliate member of the International Cricket Council (ICC), and in 2017 an associate member. Today, the reformed Shanghai Cricket Club hosts the Shanghai International Cricket Sixes, a Sixes tournament involving teams from around the world.

== Players ==
The following players played for Shanghai and also played first-class cricket:

- Howard Parkes - played for Warwickshire in 1898 and for London County in 1900.
- Edward Barrett - played for Hampshire between 1896 and 1925
- John Mayhew - played for Oxford University between 1929 and 1931
- Robert Melsome - played for Gloucestershire between 1925 and 1934
- Livingstone Walker - played for London County and Surrey between 1900 and 1904
- Leslie Crockwell - played for the Europeans in India in 1920

== See also ==
- Shanghai Cricket Club
- China national cricket team
