= Straits Settlements cricket team =

Cricket team that represented Straits Settlements (1890–1940)

The Straits Settlements cricket team was the team that represented the Straits Settlements in international cricket matches between 1890 and 1940.

== History ==
Between 1890 and 1909, the Straits Settlements played regular Interport matches against Hong Kong, Ceylon and Shanghai. After 1909 they formed the combined Malaya cricket team along with the Federated Malay States for these matches, but continued to play international matches against the Federated Malay States.

== Players ==
The following players played for the Straits Settlements and also played first-class cricket:

- Charles Higginbotham - played for the South African Army in 1906 and the British Army in 1912
- Henry Talbot - played for the MCC in 1895
- Theodore Hubback - played for Lancashire in 1892
- John Healing - played for Cambridge University and Gloucestershire between 1894 and 1906
- Edward Barrett - played for Hampshire between 1896 and 1925
- Walter Parsons - played for Hampshire in 1882
- Francis Mugliston - played for Lancashire between 1906 and 1908
- Bruce Eddis - played for a combined Army/Navy team in 1919
- William Goodman - played for the Gentlemen of Philadelphia in 1899
- Sydney Maartensz - played for Hampshire in 1919
- John Chamberlain - played for Western Australia in 1907
- Robert Braddell - played for Oxford University and the MCC between 1908 and 1911
- Cyril Simpson - played for Northamptonshire in 1908
- Richard Wodehouse - played for the Europeans in India in 1923 and 1924
- Trevor Spring - played for Somerset in 1909 and 1910
- Edward Baker - played for Sussex between 1912 and 1919 and for Somerset in 1921
- Gerald Livock - played for Middlesex between 1925 and 1927
- Robert Phayre - played first-class cricket in India in 1925
- Edward Armitage - played for Hampshire between 1919 and 1925
- Billy King - played for Dublin University in 1922
- Charles Congdon - played for the Royal Navy between 1921 and 1929
- John Neve - played for the MCC in 1936
- Philip Stewart-Brown - played for Oxford University between 1924 and 1926
- Gerald Aste - played for various teams in India between 1922 and 1936
- Herbert Hopkins - played for Worcestershire between 1921 and 1931
- Godfrey Bryan - played for Kent between 1920 and 1933
- Cecil Wigglesworth - played for the Royal Air Force in 1927
- Denys Hill - played for Worcestershire between 1927 and 1929
- Bertie Perkins - played for Glamorgan between 1925 and 1933
- Victor Croome - played for the Royal Air Force between 1928 and 1930
- Cyril Reed - played ten first class matches in India between 1928 and 1948
- Frank Simpson - played for the Army in 1931
- Ernest Dynes - played for the Minor Counties between 1928 and 1930
- Laddie Outschoorn - played for Worcestershire between 1946 and 1959
- Reginald Thoy - played two first-class matches in England in 1955 and 1957
- Francis Hugonin - played for Essex in 1927 and 1928
