= Federated Malay States cricket team =

The Federated Malay States cricket team was a team that represented the Federated Malay States in international cricket matches between 1905 and 1940. Cricket has been played in Peninsular Malaysia since the 1880s, and the Federated Malay States usually combined with the Straits Settlements cricket team to form the Malaya cricket team. Indeed, of their 37 recorded matches, only one was not against the Straits Settlements.

== History ==
The Federated Malay States played against the Straits Settlements 36 times between 1905 and 1940, winning 20 matches. The Straits Settlements won eight times, and eight matches were drawn. They also played one match against Hong Kong in May 1926, winning by an innings. The highlights of their series against the Straits Settlements were 408/9 declared that they scored in 1937, their highest score in the series, and the 218 scored by Cyril Reed in 1933, the highest score in the series.

== Players ==
The following players played for the Federated Malay States and also played first-class cricket:

- Edward Barrett – played for Hampshire and the MCC between 1896 and 1925.
- Henry Talbot – played for the MCC in 1895.
- Sydney Maartensz – played for Hampshire in 1919.
- Maurice Foster – played for Worcestershire and the MCC between 1908 and 1936.
- Claude Bancroft – played for the West Indies on their 1906 tour of England.
- Archibald Spooner – played for Lancashire between 1906 and 1909.
- Neville Foster – played for Worcestershire between 1914 and 1923.
- Leslie Prentice – played for Middlesex between 1920 and 1923.
- Bert Pratten – played for New South Wales from 1913 to 1915.
- William Cockburn – played for Scotland in 1921.
- Henry Nicoll – played for Scotland in 1914.
- Rattan Jaidka – played for Gloucestershire in 1927.
- Alfred Hill – played for Warwickshire in 1920.
- Percival Penman – played for New South Wales from 1914 to 1916.
- Lall Singh – played Test cricket for India in 1932.
- Herbert Hopkins – played for Worcestershire between 1921 and 1931.
- Christopher Foster – played for Worcestershire in 1927.
- William Smith – played for Scotland in 1927.
- T. K. Sukumaran – played for Indians in the Malay Presidency Match in 1924 and 1925.
- Cyril Reed – played ten first-class matches in India between 1928 and 1948.
- Thomas Hart – played for Oxford University in 1931 and 1932, and for Scotland in 1933 and 1934.
- Norman Grenier – played one first-class match for Auckland in 1913.
