= J. G. Greig =

English cricketer

Personal information
- Full name: John Glennie Greig
- Born: 24 October 1871; Mhow, Bombay Presidency, British India
- Died: 24 May 1958 (aged 86); Milford on Sea, Hampshire, England
- Nickname: Junglee
- Batting: Right-handed
- Bowling: Right-arm slow

Domestic team information
- Years: Team
- 1893/94–1920/21: Europeans
- 1898–1910: Marylebone Cricket Club
- 1901–1922: Hampshire
- 1902/03: Bombay

Career statistics
Competition	First-class
Matches	125
Runs scored	7,348
Batting average	36.37
100s/50s	15/32
Top score	249*
Balls bowled	6,550
Wickets	138
Bowling average	23.46
5 wickets in innings	8
10 wickets in match	2
Best bowling	7/35
Catches/stumpings	102/–
- Source: Cricinfo, 11 September 2020

John Glennie Greig CIE (24 October 1871 — 24 May 1958) was an English first-class cricketer and cricket administrator, British Army officer, racquets and tennis player, and Roman Catholic priest.

Greig's military career spanned from 1892 to 1921, beginning with his commissioning into the Loyal North Lancashire Regiment and eventual transfer to the British Indian Army. In British India, he held the appointments of aide-de-camp and military secretary to the Governor of Bombay. He would later serve with the 107th Pioneers during the First World War.

As a cricketer, his first-class career spanned from 1893 to 1922, with Greig predominantly playing for the Europeans cricket team in India and Hampshire in England. In 125 first-class matches, he scored over 6,500 runs and took nearly 140 wickets. He was considered the leading "white" player of the time in India, and in 1898 he made the first double-century to be scored in first-class cricket on Indian soil. Greig was head of the committee which selected the Indian team which toured England in 1911, the first by an All-Indian team. During his time in India, he was also credited with discovering Palwankar Baloo while he was engaged with the Poona Gymkhana. The cricket historian Vasant Raiji likened Greig's contribution to Indian cricket to that of Ranjitsinhji's to English cricket. He would later serve Hampshire in an administrative capacity as its secretary from 1921 to 1930 and its president in 1945 and 1946.

Greig was also a competent racquets and tennis player, who won the Western India Tennis Championships. Later in his life, he would be ordained as a Roman Catholic priest and was appointed to be the first resident priest in Ringwood, Hampshire.

== Early life and military career ==
Greig was born in British India at Mhow in October 1871. He was educated in England at Downside School, before proceeding to the Catholic seminary Ushaw College. However, he did not at this stage enter into ecclesiastical duties, instead attending the Royal Military College at Sandhurst. He graduated from there into the Loyal North Lancashire Regiment as a second lieutenant in November 1892, with promotion to lieutenant following in December 1894.

Greig transferred to the British Indian Army in October 1895, where he was attached to the Indian Staff Corps. He was appointed aide-de-camp to the Governor of Bombay in February 1902, and was shortly thereafter promoted to captain in November 1901. He vacated his aide-de-camp appointment in December 1902, but was reappointed in June 1904. In October 1907, Greig was appointed military secretary to the incumbent Governor of Bombay, Sir George Clarke. He was promoted to major in November 1910, and was made a Companion to the Order of the Indian Empire in the 1911 Delhi Durbar Honours. He would serve Clarke's successor, Lord Willingdon, as his military secretary. Prior to the First World War, he spent time serving on the North-West Frontier Province. Greig served during the First World War with the 107th Pioneers, acting as a temporary lieutenant colonel from August to October 1918 whilst commanding a battalion. Following the end of the war, he was promoted to lieutenant colonel in July 1919, and retired from active service in November 1921.

== First-class cricket career ==
=== Early career in India and England ===
Greig is credited with discovering Palwankar Baloo (pictured) during his membership of the Poona Gymkhana

Greig's cricket began while at Downside and Ushaw College's. While serving in the Loyal North Lancashire Regiment in British India in 1893, he made his debut in first-class cricket for the Europeans cricket team against the Parsees at Bombay in the 1893–94 Bombay Presidency Match. He featured regularly for the Europeans up to September 1896, with Greig having a particularly successful 1896–97 season, in which he scored 259 runs in his two Bombay Presidency Matches, making three half centuries and a highest score of 98. From the early 1890s, Greig was a leading member of the Poona Gymkhana, where he was affectionately known as "Junglee" (a play on his first, middle and last names). He is credited with discovering Palwankar Baloo during his time at the Gymkhana. Greig would often turn up an hour before other members and accompany Baloo in the nets, where Baloo would bowl at Greig, with him encouraging Baloo by reputedly paying him eight annas each time he dismissed him. Greig sought to overcome the caste system which held Baloo back, with the leading Hindu club in Poona (whose membership was formed of conservative, higher-caste Hindus) reluctant to allow Baloo, who was lower-caste chamar, to play for them. Greig intervened, suggesting to the press that the Hindus would be foolish to deprive themselves of Baloo's bowling talents.

Greig made two first-class appearances upon his return to England in 1898, playing for the Marylebone Cricket Club (MCC) against Oxford University, and for A. J. Webbe's personal eleven against Cambridge University. He returned to India later in 1898, where he resumed playing for the Europeans in the Bombay Presidency Matches. Against the Parsees in the 1898–99 Bombay Presidency Match, he claimed his first five wicket hauls with his right-arm slow bowling, taking figures of 6 for 22 and 7 for 36 in the match. In the 1899-1900 Bombay Presidency Match against the Parsees, he recorded his maiden first-class century, making 184 runs opening the batting alongside Archie Douglas; this was the highest individual score made in India to that point.

Returning to England on leave in 1901, Greig began playing for Hampshire in the County Championship. His reputation in India was such that Ranjitsinhji wrote a letter of introduction for him to Hampshire, writing "Greig is a better batsman than I am, and is an excellent bowler as well". His first season for Hampshire was a success, with Greig scoring 1,277 runs at an average of 41.19; he made five centuries, including a maiden double-century (249 not out) against Lancashire at Liverpool. Alongside his eighteen appearances for Hampshire in 1901, he also played for the MCC and for the Gentlemen in the Gentlemen v Players fixture. The 1901 season was, in terms of the number of wickets taken, his most successful with the ball, with Greig taking 27 wickets at a bowling average of 25.62.

Returning to India following the end of the 1901 season, Greig played two matches against the Parsees in the 1902–03 Bombay Presidency Matches, becoming the first player to make 1,000 runs in the Presidency Matches, in addition to playing for Bombay against a touring Oxford University Authentics team at Bombay in November 1902, scoring 204 in Bombay's second innings; this was the first double-century in first-class cricket to made on Indian soil. He returned to England on leave in 1905 and made nine appearances in the County Championship and played against the touring Australians. He again performed well for Hampshire, averaging over 50 with the bat. He made three centuries in the season, all against Worcestershire; at Worcester in his first match of the season, Greig made scores of 115 and 130, and later in season he made an unbeaten 187 at Bournemouth. Returning to India for the winter, he made two appearances in the 1905–06 Presidency Matches, before returning to England on leave in the summer of 1906, where he made sixteen appearances in the County Championship and one appearance for the MCC; he did not manage to make a century during the 1906 season, scoring 867 runs at an average of 26.27.

=== Later career and administrative duties ===
Over the coming seasons, Greig remained in India in his capacity as military secretary to the Governor of Bombay, playing for the Europeans with some success in the 1907–08 and 1908–09 seasons. Returning to England in 1910, he made twelve County Championship appearances, alongside playing once for the MCC. Upon his return to India, Greig was appointed to head the committee to select the Indian team which toured England in 1911, the first by an All-Indian team. The composition of the committee reflected the changing balance of power in Bombay, with representatives from the Hindu, Muslim, and Parsis communities. Despite his great knowledge of Indian cricket, Greig's appointment as committee head was seen more as a political move designed to circumvent any selection deadlocks which might emerge between the different communities represented on the committee. Greig's first-class cricket was solely played in India between 1911 and 1913, predominantly for the Europeans, though he did also feature for his own personal eleven against the Hindus at the Poona Gymkhana. When on leave in England, Greig made nine appearances in the 1914 County Championship, before it was curtailed by the outbreak of the First World War. His last season before the war saw him score 489 runs and making a single century.

Although first-class cricket had been suspended in England, this was not the case in India, where first-class cricket was played throughout the entirety of the war. He played for the Europeans in the Bombay Quadrangular Tournament during the war, while also playing for a team termed "England" against India at Bombay in December 1915, a match arranged to raise money for the Bombay Presidency War and Relief Fund; he made a double-century (216) which helped "England" to an innings and 263 runs victory. Despite playing a large part of his first-class cricket in India, Greig was described as "no lover of Indian cricket" by the political scientist and author Ronojoy Sen. This was exemplified in a match between the Europeans and the Hindus in the 1916–17 Bombay Quadrangular Tournament, when he was adjudged out stumped by native umpire Mukundrao Pai. Greig disagreed with his decision, and was ordered from the field by Pai for quarrelling and disagreeing with his decision. Upon his return to the pavilion, Greig's protests against the decision continued and led to the game being delayed for thirty minutes. The subsequent controversy, which was covered by extensively by the press in India, resulted in the Hindus impressing on the British authorities the need for neutral umpires, with subsequent games having a member of the Muslims or Parsees teams officiating when the Hindus and Europeans played.

Following the war, Greig returned home to England in 1920, where he made four appearances for Hampshire in the County Championship. Returning to India following the 1920 season, he made his final appearance for the Europeans in the 1920–21 Bombay Quadrangular Tournament. Following his retirement from the military in 1921, he returned home to England and made six appearances in the 1921 County Championship, before making a final appearance for Hampshire against Somerset in the 1922 County Championship. Greig was elected to replace George Harvey Muir as Hampshire secretary in 1921, a post he would hold until 1930. He later served as Hampshire president in 1945 and 1946.

=== Legacy and statistics ===
Greig was considered by Sen to be a "prolific batsman", who was for many years considered the best "white" batsman in India. Of short stature, he was derogatorily remarked by D. B. Deodhar as a "white pygmy", while the cricket historian Vasant Raiji wrote "though slight of physique he possessed strong wrists and uncommonly keen vision, which enabled him to employ several attractive strokes all round the wicket". Wisden noted that his most attractive stroke was the cut, which had rarely been seen in India. His thirst for run-scoring was likened to that of Don Bradman and Sunil Gavaskar. His bowling was described by Deodhar as "brainy and artful", while noting that his fielding was "as good as his batting".

Greig played 39 first-class matches for the Europeans, scoring 2,300 runs at an average of 37.70, making three centuries and fourteen half centuries. As a bowler, he took 72 wickets for the Europeans at a bowling average of 14.47, taking four five wicket hauls and ten wickets in a match twice. In the field, he took 44 catches for the Europeans. Making 77 first-class appearances for Hampshire, he scored 4,375 runs at an average of 34.17, making ten centuries and seventeen half centuries. He found less successful bowling in English conditions, but nonetheless he took 64 wickets for Hampshire at an average of 32.03, taking five wickets in an innings on four occasions. In the field, he took 52 catches for Hampshire. His overall career first-class record was 7,348 runs at an average of 36.37, from 125 matches, while with the ball he took 138 wickets at an average of 23.46. In the field, he took a total of 102 catches.

Raiji considered his contributions to Indian cricket as of a same class as that of Ranjitsinhji to English cricket.

== Racquets and tennis ==
In addition to playing cricket in India, Greig also partook in racquets and tennis tournaments. He won the Open Singles Racquets Cup on ten occasions and competed with success in the Western India Tennis Championships; he was runner-up to Herbert Cheetham in the 1897 Championship, before defeating Cheetham in the final of the 1898 Championship.

== Ecclesiastical duties and death ==
Greig studied to become a Roman Catholic priest in 1934 at Beda College in Rome. He was ordained as a priest in 1935, and in 1937 he was appointed the first resident priest in Ringwood, Hampshire. In 1947, he was made an honorary canon of the Roman Catholic Diocese of Portsmouth. Greig died at Milford on Sea in May 1958.

== Works cited ==
- Mukherji, Raju (2020). Cricket India: Tales Untold: Controversies and Contributions. Chennai: Notion Press. ISBN 9781636337869.
- Kidambi, Prashant (2019). Cricket Country: An Indian Odyssey in the Age of Empire. Oxford University Press. ISBN 9780198843139.
- Sen, Ronojoy (2015). Nation at Play: A History of Sport in India. New York City: Columbia University Press. ISBN 9780231539937.
- Menon, Dilip M. (2006). Cultural History of Modern India. New Delhi: Social Science Press. ISBN 9788187358251.
- Raiji, Vasant (1986). India's Hambledon Men. Bombay: Tyeby Press.
