= Kilvidi Seshachari =

Indian cricketer (1875–1917)

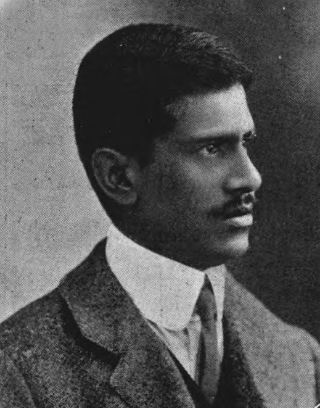

Personal information
- Born: 2 January 1875; Madras, British India
- Died: 25 January 1917 (aged 42); Calcutta, British India
- Batting: Right-handed
- Role: Wicket-keeper

Domestic team information
- Years: Team
- 1902/03–1912/13: Hindus

Career statistics
Competition	First-class
Matches	19
Runs scored	138
Batting average	5.75
100s/50s	0/0
Top score	29
Catches/stumpings	20/16
- Source: ESPNcricinfo, 29 November 2021

Kilvidi Seshachari (2 January 1875 – 25 January 1917) was an Indian cricketer and a member of the first Indian cricket team to tour England in 1911. He played for the Hindus team as a wicket-keeper in the Bombay Quadrangular tournaments between 1902 and 1912. He was considered the best wicket-keeper in India in reports from the period. In addition to the Hindus cricket team in Bombay and the Indian team that toured England, Seshachari played for the Ootacamund Civilians and the Maharaja of Natore's cricket teams.

== Biography ==
Seshachari was born on 2 January 1875 (Note: There is some confusion about Seshachari's date of birth, with some reports indicating that it was 2 January 1876. The Wisden Cricketers' Almanack of 1913 indicates that it was 2 January 1875.) in Madras, in what was then British India. He took up playing cricket in his teens and soon became a well known wicket-keeper. He played during this period as a member of various minor clubs before being elected a member of the "Premier Hindu Club of Southern India". Some of the records of the period have Seshachari listed as an alumnus of Dulwich College in London, England.

In the early 1900s, Seshachari moved to Ootacamund, in Southern India, to work. There he was formally trained as a cricketer by Europeans who played the game, including the missionary and cricketer, Charles Studd who was a pastor in the local church. It was here that Seshachari practised his wicket-keeping skills with balls being thrown at him indiscriminately, improving his reflexes. Records from the period called him the best stumper in India. During this time, he helped the United Hindus draw a game against the visiting Oxford Authentics in 1902. He continued to travel to Bombay to play for the Hindus cricket team in the annual Bombay Presidency cricket tournament. A report in the 1903 Indian Sporting Times about his performance for United Hindus against the Parsees said, "Seshachari is a stumper of the highest order, and has no equal in India." Building on strong performances in the tournament he was picked for the 1904 tour of the team to England, which was later aborted. He was recruited in 1906 by the Maharaja of Natore in Bengal in a successful attempt to defeat the all-European Calcutta Cricket Club. He continued to play for the team through the early 1910s. In this same period, work in the plantations kept him busy, although he played regularly for the Hindus in Bombay, Ootacamund Civilians, and for the Maharaja of Natore's teams.

Seshachari was a member of the Indian cricket team that toured England in 1911, under the captaincy of the 19-year-old Bhupinder Singh of Patiala. He was one of the three Hindu Brahmin men on the team; the other two being Bangalore Jayaram and Mukundrao Pai from Bombay. In addition to Hindus, the team had representation from the Parsee and Muslims cricket teams, making it the first all-Indian team to tour the British Isles. In the tour, Seshachari, as the wicket-keeper, made for a formidable pair with spinner Palwankar Baloo. Despite his personal success behind the stumps, the team's collective performance was considered sub-par, winning only 2 of the 23 games that they played.

Seshachari played his last match in the Bombay Quadrangular in 1912. After this, he played only occasionally for the Maharaja of Natore's team. He returned to London in 1913, with a report in the July 1913 edition of the Cricket magazine calling him one among the "two best wicket-keepers who have ever represented overseas teams in England", with the other one being the South African wicket-keeper Ernest Halliwell. He remained associated with the game as an umpire, including officiating the finals of the 1913/14 edition of the Bombay Quadrangular in which the Hindus drew against the Muslims.

Seshachari died from pneumonia on 25 January 1917 at Calcutta Medical College. He was aged 42.
