= Roland Ingram-Johnson =

English cricketer and soldier

Personal information
- Full name: Roland Edward Sydney Ingram-Johnson
- Born: 28 March 1899; Lanchester, County Durham, England
- Died: 17 June 1967 (aged 68); Norwich, Norfolk, England
- Batting: Unknown
- Role: Wicket-keeper

Domestic team information
- Years: Team
- 1925/26–1945/46: Europeans

Career statistics
Competition	First-class
Matches	5
Runs scored	53
Batting average	7.57
100s/50s	–/–
Top score	19
Catches/stumpings	4/2
- Source: Cricinfo, 11 November 2023

Roland Edward Sydney Ingram-Johnson (28 March 1899 – 17 June 1967) was an English first-class cricketer and an officer in the British Indian Army.

Ingram-Johnson was born in March 1899 at Lanchester, County Durham. He was educated at Rossall School, where he played for the school cricket team. Ingram-Johnson was commissioned into the British Indian Army as a second lieutenant in September 1918, with promotion to lieutenant following in August 1919. Serving with the 151st Punjabi Rifles, he was made an acting captain in December 1919 whilst commanding a company. Whilst in British India, Ingram-Johnson made his debut in first-class cricket for the Europeans cricket team against the Muslims at Lahore in the 1925–26 Lahore Tournament. Two further first-class appearances followed in March 1928, for the Europeans against the Muslims in the 1927–28 Lahore Tournament, and for the Punjab Governor's XI against Northern India. He played club cricket in Northern India, and alongside Norman Burrell, he was the only club cricketer to pass 1,000 runs for the season in 1927.

Having been promoted to the full rank of captain, he was later promoted to major in August 1936. Ingram-Johnson served with the British Indian Army during the Second World War, during the course of which he was promoted to lieutenant colonel in August 1944. Later in 1944, following a sixteen-year gap, he returned to first-class cricket when he played for a Services XI against the Bengal Governor's XI at Calcutta. Following the war, he made a final first-class appearance for the Europeans against the Hindus in the 1946–47 Bombay Pentangular, which was the final edition of that tournament. In five first-class matches, he scored 53 runs with a highest score of 19; as a wicket-keeper, he took four catches and made two stumpings. He retired from active service in June 1947, and returned home, where he played club cricket in the Durham Senior Cricket League. Ingram-Johnson died at Norwich in June 1967.
