= A Corner of a Foreign Field =

2002 book by Ramachandra Guha

- Book cover, first edition
- Author: Ramachandra Guha
- Language: English
- Publisher: Macmillan Publishers
- Publication date: 2002
- ISBN: 978-0330491167

A Corner of a Foreign Field: The Indian History of a British Sport is a 2002 book by Indian historian Ramachandra Guha that offers a historical account of cricket in the Indian subcontinent. Some critics have called it one of the finest books on cricket.

== Background ==
The book was initially conceived as a biography of left-arm spinner Palwankar Baloo. Baloo was a Dalit, a community that has historically been subjected to untouchability under the Indian caste system. Belonging to chamar (cobbler) community, Guha writes how the four Palwankar brother, Baloo, Palwankar Shivram, Vithal Palwankar and Palwankar Ganpat, took a different take at leather. His cricketing feats, however, enabled him to overcome contemporary Indian social barriers associated with being a Dalit. As Guha explored Baloo's story further, the book expanded to become a social history of cricket in India. On the subject of the book, Guha has written, "The making of modern India is its theme, with cricket serving merely as a vehicle, as my chief source of illustrative example." As historian, Guha also covers the Indian independence movement through a different angle and how the society adapted to the newly formed nations. Mahatma Gandhi opposed the sport for the reason that the inter-country matches were organized between teams based on religion.

== Reception ==
An early edition cover featured a picture of author R. K. Narayan playing cricket with his nephews and niece.

The book won the 2002 Book of the Year Award from The Cricket Society and Marylebone Cricket Club.
