= Indian cricket team in England in 1911 =

The Indian cricket team touring England and the British Isles in the summer of 1911 was the first all-Indian team to tour the country. The team was led by the then 19-year old Maharaja of Patiala Bhupinder Singh and had representation from the Parsees, Hindus, and the Muslims. The team had limited success winning only six amongst the 23 matches that they played on the tour.

== Background ==
The early 1900s were marked with violence between young Indians and British officials in India. It was then decided that a pan-national team touring England would generate goodwill and portray a positive image of the British empire. The first all-Indian team to tour the British Isles was in 1911, which had representation from the Parsees, the Hindus, and the Muslims. The team was captained by the then Maharaja of Patiala, Bhupinder Singh, who was then aged 19.

== Indian squad ==
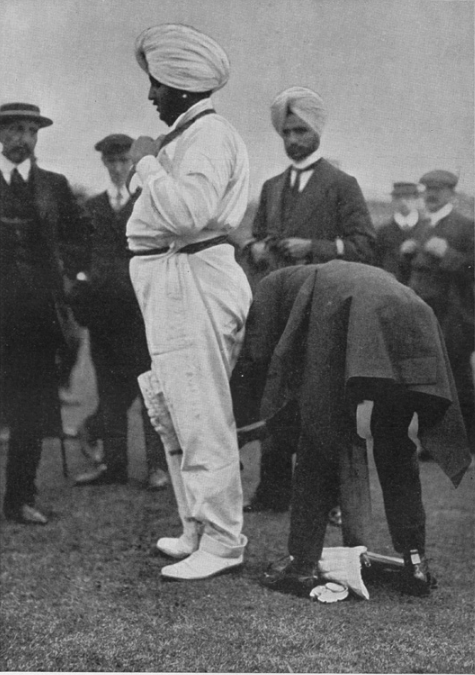
Maharajah Bhupinder Singh of Patiala (1911) having his pads adjusted before going in to bat.

In the 19th century, two representative teams of the Parsees had toured England in 1886 and 1888 with limited success. However, these teams were limited by representation and were not an all-Indian team.

When the organizers of the tour were putting together the team, their first choice of a captain was Ranjitsinhji, the Jam Sahib, who by the time had been instated as the ruler of Nawanagar in 1907. However, Ranji was keeping away from organized cricket in British India, having been called out for his administrative lapses in tackling the plague and subsequent drought that had afflicted his state. Ranji declined the invitation and sent across a note offering his 'cordial sympathy' and instead offered Rupees 1,000 toward the guarantee fund. Two other cricketing royals who were already in Britain, Rajkumar Shivaji Rao of Baroda and Rajkumar Hitendara Narayan of Cooch Behar, who were both pursuing their studies, were not considered for captaincy. Rao was the son of Maharaja Sayajirao Gaekwad III of Baroda, and was studying at Christ Church, Oxford, while Narayan was the son of Nripendra Narayan and was at Eton College and later at Cambridge. With this, the organizers landed on the Maharaja of Patiala, Bhupinder Singh, as the captain of the team. Some reports, including a statement from one of the selectors said that another factor for this choice was to get the services of the Maharajah's private secretary Kekhashru Mistry.

The eventual Indian squad of 1911, captained by Maharajah Bhupinder Singh of Patiala, also had his aide-de-camp and Parsee cricketer Major Kekhashru Mistry, and had representation by way of six Parsis, five Hindus, and three Muslims. The team also had two Dalits, then considered as 'untouchables', Palwankar Baloo and his brother Palwankar Shivram. Shivram was hurriedly called into the team after two players, Maneck Chand and Noor Elahi, withdrew from the tour in the days prior to the tour, due per some accounts to their employer, the Maharajah of Kashmir, rescinding permission to have them take part in the tour.

- Maharaja of Patiala
- Kekhashru Mistry
- Mukundrao Pai
- HF Mulla
- RP Meherhomji
- Bangalore Jayaram
- Hormasji Kanga
- JS Warden
- Palwankar Shivram
- Salamuddin
- Palwankar Baloo
- Shafqat Hussain
- Kilvidi Seshachari (wicket-keeper)

== Summary ==
The all-Indian team played 23 games in the British Isles between 1 June 1911 and 26 August 1911. The team did not have much success winning only two of the games. Wisden Cricketers' Almanack called the tournament a "complete disappointment".

=== Reception ===
The Indian team departed Bombay on 6 May 1911 from Ballard Pier, seen off by a large crowd, and reached Marseille two weeks later. They covered the further journey to London by train. While the captain, the Maharaja of Patiala, covered the trip in a deluxe train and got off at Charing Cross, the rest of the team members covered this journey in a regular train. There was significant attention on the Maharaja, with the Daily Express writing, "His Highness's gorgeous costume of rich flowered silk of bright hue attracted much attention as he strode the platform wearing about his neck a garland of roses." The Maharaja was received at the Buckingham Palace by George V, whose coronation was a few weeks away. He addressed the media from his a private villa that had been rented for him on Addison Road in Kensington and told the Sporting Life, "This tour marks an epoch in Indian history. It is the first occasion in the annals of our country that the great Indian communities have been banded together in one team. Association in the sports field, the bringing together in one common object all classes of our race, and the meeting with the best class of English sportsmen, can only strengthen the bonds of union and good-fellowship." While the Maharaja stayed at the private villa, the rest of the Indian team continued to the Victoria station and stayed at the Imperial Hotel. The manager of the team, J. M. Divecha, viewed the tour as an educational trip and told the Sporting Life, "We know that we cannot claim to be great cricketers but we hope to be much better for our experiences, and we will carry back to India and assimilate the knowledge we have gained here."

=== Tour summary ===
The Indian team started the tour by playing against three of the stronger teams, Oxford University, Marylebone Cricket Club, and the Cambridge University. In these three games, the team was beaten comprehensively, twice by an innings and once by eight wickets. During this time, the team was plagued by the captain, the Maharaja, being away for societal events and other responsibilities. He spent much of his time socializing with the London elite, attending parties and the various coronation-related events. He even had a private audience with the King, George V, and was a guest of his in the royal pavilion at Ascot. In July, after the coronation of the king, the Maharaja had a surgery for tonsillitis and suffered a hemorrhage. With these events, the Maharaja shortened his stay with the team and returned to India after three games. He took his aide-de-camp and batsman K. M. Mistry, the team's best batsman, back along with him significantly weakening the team's capabilities.

After the Maharaja's departure, the team was captained by Parsee, Hormasji Kanga. Kanga had earlier represented Hampstead Cricket Club in a prior season, and had also played for the MCC after completing his medical studies earlier in England.

=== Select match summaries ===
==== First-class: India versus Oxford University Cricket Club ====
2 June 1911
Scorecard

India	v	Oxford University Cricket Club
193 (71.1 overs); Maharaja of Patiala 47; A. J. Evans 4/17		242 (69.5 overs); I. P. F. Campbell 106; M. D. Bulsara 5/87
97 (44.3 overs); B. P. Baloo 27; A. J. Evans 5/32		49/2 (8 overs); R. O. Lagden 29; J. S. Warden 1/4

Oxford University won by 8 wickets
Christ Church College Ground, Oxford
Umpires: H. B. Daft and G. Quelch

==== First-class: India versus Marylebone Cricket Club ====
9 June 1911
Scorecard

India	v	Marylebone Cricket Club
204 (64 overs); K. M. Mistry 78; J. T. Hearne 5/47		468 (104.1 overs); E. H. D. Sewell 129; Salamuddin 5/128
96 (28.3 overs); B. Jayaram 23; F. A. Tarrant 4/29

Marylebone Cricket Club won by an innings and 168 runs
Lord's Cricket Ground
Umpires: C. E. Richardson and J. P. Whiteside

==== First-class: India versus Cambridge University ====
14 June 1911
Scorecard

Cambridge University	v	India
434 (88.5 overs); H. G. H. Mulholland 153; B. P. Baloo 8/103		183 (67.2 overs); K. M. Mistry 53; J. H. Bruce-Lockhart 6/55
		180 (66.4 overs); K. M. Mistry 39; M. Falcon 5/50

Cambridge University won by an innings and 71 runs
F. P. Fenner's Ground, Cambridge
Umpires: A. F. Bannister and J. Blake

=== Return to India ===
The return of the team back to India found a lot of coverage in the Indian media. The Hindu wrote, "It must be regretfully acknowledged that judging by the performances of the team, the best cricket in India is only second class". The Indian Spectator, wrote, "Our national cricket team has returned from England with the confession that it had to learn much and teach little." Some of the European owned newspapers were more appreciative of the team's performance, with the Bombay Gazette writing, "The Indian cricketers' tour has come to an end and they can look back upon their record with justifiable pride'.
