= International cricket in 1943–44 =

International cricket season

The 1943–44 international cricket season was from September 1943 to April 1944. No international tournaments were held during this season due to Second World War.

== Season overview ==
Major tournaments
Start date	Tournament	Winners
23 November 1943	(India) Bombay Pentangular Tournament	Hindus

== November ==
=== 1943–44 Bombay Pentangular Tournament ===
Group stage
No.	Date	Team 1	Captain 1	Team 2	Captain 2	Venue	Result
Match 1	23–25 November	Parsees	Minocher Mobed	Muslims	Not mentioned	Brabourne Stadium, Bombay	Match drawn (Muslims won on 1st innings)
Match 2	26–28 November	Hindus	Vijay Merchant	Europeans	Not mentioned	Brabourne Stadium, Bombay	Hindus by an innings and 209 runs
Match 3	29 Nov–1 December	Rest	Pierre D'Avoine	Muslims	Not mentioned	Brabourne Stadium, Bombay	Match drawn (Rest won on 1st innings)
Final
No.	Date	Team 1	Captain 1	Team 2	Captain 2	Venue	Result
Match 4	3–6 December	Hindus	Vijay Merchant	Rest	Pierre D'Avoine	Brabourne Stadium, Bombay	Hindus by an innings and 61 runs
