= Mukundrao Pai =

Indian cricketer

Mukundrao Damodar Pai
Personal information
- Born: 21 June 1883; Bombay, British India
- Died: 5 August 1948 (aged 65); Bombay, India
- Batting: Right-handed

Domestic team information
- Years: Team
- 1906/07–1920/21: Hindus

Career statistics
| Competition | First-class |
|---|---|
| Matches | 22 |
| Runs scored | 640 |
| Batting average | 18.82 |
| 100s/50s | 1/1 |
| Top score | 107 |
| Catches/stumpings | 14/– |
- Source: ESPNcricinfo, 29 November 2021

Mukundrao Damodar Pai (21 June 1883 – 5 August 1948) was an Indian cricketer and a member of the first Indian team that toured England in 1911 under the captaincy of Bhupinder Singh of Patiala. Pai was the first Indian cricketer to score a century on his first-class debut, playing for the Hindus against the Europeans in the Bombay Presidency game in 1906.

In a career spanning 15 years, he played a total of 22 first-class matches scoring 640 runs before retiring as captain of the Hindus cricket team in 1920.

== Biography ==
Pai was born on 21 June 1883 in Bombay, in what was then British India into a Gaud Saraswat Brahmin family.

He made his first-class cricket debut in the Bombay Presidency game between Hindus and Europeans at the Bombay Gymkhana in 1906. He scored a century on debut, scoring 107 runs in the first innings before being bowled by British army officer William Faviell. In scoring the century, Pai became the first Indian to score a century on his first-class debut. He followed it up with a score of 44 in the second innings before being bowled by another British army officer John Turner. The Hindus went on to win the game by 238 runs. The Europeans were captained by J.G. Greig, while the Hindus were captained by C.V. Mehta.

Pai was a member of the Indian cricket team that toured England in 1911 under the captaincy of Bhupinder Singh of Patiala, a tour that is recognised as the first official tour of an Indian team to England. As the youngest member of the touring team, he did not have a very successful tour, playing four of the 14 first-class matches on the tour, and scoring a total of 51 runs, including a highest score of 24. He played in the matches against Oxford University, Leicestershire, Northamptonshire, and Warwickshire. He was employed in Bombay as a manager with the trading company E.D. Sassoon & Co., which was run at that time by the city's prominent Baghdadi Jews.

Pai was elevated to the captaincy of the Hindus during the 1912–13 season, with some reports indicating that the decision might have been motivated by his Brahmanical caste. In a speech while receiving an honour from the Gaud Saraswat Brahmin Mitra Mandal, he acknowledged that the captaincy title had to belong to Palwankar Baloo, who was much more experienced and senior than he was. After his debut century, Pai's next score of more than 50 in a first-class game came in the 1917–18 Bombay Quadrangular match against the Parsees where he scored 75 runs in the first innings before being bowled by H. J. Vajifdar. The game ended in a draw. He played his last first-class game, captaining the Hindus against the Parsees, in the finals of the 1920–21 Bombay Quadrangular. The game ended in a draw. The game was also Baloo's last first-class game; Pai had to spend some time off the field during the game due to ill-health, allowing for Baloo to captain the team for periods of play. In a career spanning 15 years, Pai played a total of 22 first-class matches scoring 640 runs. After his retirement, Pai retained his linkage with the Hindus cricket team in an advisory capacity.

During his playing times in the Bombay Quadrangular, he also officiated as an umpire. In an incident during the 1916 tournament game between the Hindus and the Europeans, he ordered J. G. Greig, an army major also known as 'Jungly' Greig, off the field for quarrelling and not accepting the umpire's decision, after Greig had been given out stumped off the bowling of C. K. Nayudu. The Europeans lodged a protest, with Greig writing a letter to the Bombay Gymkhana calling Pai's propriety into question. The Gymkhana sided with Pai, calling the army major's attack "entirely opposed to the interests of sport and ... calculated to create general unpleasantness". The Gymkhana went on to note that a player had "no right to challenge the decision" and that "an umpire's decision must in all cases be held to be final". The controversy resulted in the Hindus impressing on the British the need for neutral umpires, with subsequent games having a member of the Muslims or Parsees teams officiating when the Hindus and Europeans played.

Pai died on 5 August 1948 in the Chikalwadi neighbourhood of Bombay. He was aged 65.
