= Gandhi (TV series) =

Indian Television series

- Genre: Historical drama
- Created by: Hansal Mehta; Sameer Nair
- Based on: Gandhi Before India and Gandhi: The Years That Changed the World by Ramachandra Guha
- Screenplay by: Vaibhav Vishal; Karan Vyas; Felix von Stumm; Yashna Malhotra; Hema Gopinathan; Sehaj Kaur Maini
- Directed by: Hansal Mehta
- Starring: Pratik Gandhi; Bhamini Oza Gandhi; Tom Felton; Kabir Bedi
- Music by: A. R. Rahman
- Country of origin: India
- Original languages: Gujarati; Hindi; English

Production
- Executive producers: Priya Jhavar; Prasoon Garg; Adam Berkowitz
- Producers: Sameer Nair; Siddharth Khaitan; Deepak Segal
- Cinematography: Pratham Mehta
- Editor: Amitesh Mukherjee
- Production company: Applause Entertainment

Gandhi is an Indian biographical historical drama television series created and directed by Hansal Mehta. Produced by Applause Entertainment, the series depicts the life of Mahatma Gandhi, based on the books Gandhi Before India and Gandhi: The Years That Changed the World by Ramachandra Guha. The series is planned to span three seasons. The shooting for the first season set between 1888 to 1915 was completed in August 2024.

Season one of the show follows Gandhi’s early life, starting in colonial India as a curious teenager, then as a shy law student in London, and finally as a young lawyer who spends 23 life-changing years in South Africa. The series had its world premiere in the 'Primetime Programme' of the 2025 Toronto International Film Festival on 17 September 2025.

== Premise ==
The series is expected to cover significant aspects of Gandhi's life, including his early work in South Africa to his role as the Father of the Nation in India's independence movement.

== Cast ==
- Pratik Gandhi as Mahatma Gandhi
- Bhamini Oza as Kasturba Gandhi
- Tom Felton as Josiah Oldfield
- Amar Upadhyay
- Adinath Kothare as Gopal Krishna Gokhale
- Aseem Hattangady as Dada Abdullah
- Libby Mai
- Harry Mckeown
- Judd Berg as Hermann Kallenbach
- Joe Evans (Constable Rowling)
- R Badree
- Molly Wright
- Ralph Adeniyi
- James Murray
- Lindon Alexander
- Joseph Steyne
- Ramdas (Priyansh Bajaj)
- Jonno Davies
- Simon Lennon
- Jaival Pathak as young Harilal Gandhi
- Leon Cole as Police Officer
- Harry Baker / Agent Provocateur / Gandhi protester (uncredited)
- John Todd as Boer guerilla fighter (uncredited)
- Salvatore Pulvirenti as chestnut seller (uncredited)
- Greg Macdonald as CF Andrews (Uncredited)

== Production ==
=== Development ===
In May 2022, Applause Entertainment were reported to be working on a biographic multi-series television series on Mahatma Gandhi, with a working title of Gandhi, dubbed "India's The Crown after they acquired the rights to the Ramachandra Guha biographies Gandhi Before India and Gandhi: The Years That Changed the World.

In July 2022, Hansal Mehta, was named director and showrunner with Siddhartha Basu named as historical consultant, factual advisor and creative consultant. The series is written by Vaibhav Vishal, Hema Gopinathan, Sehaj Maini, Karan Vyas, Felix Von Stumm and Yashna Malhotra. Guha, Basu and ScriptUp Studio serve as script advisers. Mukesh Chhabra serves as casting director in India and Shakyra Dowling is an international casting director. Shashank Tere heads production design. Pia Benegal has designed the costumes. Pratham Mehta is a head cinematographer. A. R. Rahman will compose the music for series.

The series is expected to be produced with a worldwide audience in mind. Filming is expected to take place in Gujarati, Hindi and English for authenticity.

The first season will have eight episodes with 60 minute each. It will cover first 45 years of Gandhi's life including him as a law student in London and as a lawyer and activist in South Africa.The next two seasons will cover the rest of his life.

=== Casting ===
In May 2022, Pratik Gandhi was cast in the lead role. He has previously played Gandhi in Manoj Shah’s Gujarati play Mohan No Masalo. Speaking about his casting, he was quoted as saying it was “important” and “one of the biggest of my life”, adding that he was “I am very inspired by…his simplicity. I have seen people around me adapt to simplicity and I am most inspired by that.” Pratik Gandhi's wife Bhamini Oza plays Kasturba, wife of Mahatma Gandhi in the series. In 2024, Tom Felton joined the series. Libby Mai, Molly Wright, Jaival Pathak is playing young Harilal Gandhi, Ralph Adeniyi, James Murray, Lindon Alexander, Jonno Davies Simon Lennon, and Priyansh Bajaj joined the cast in April 2024.

=== Filming ===
The series entered production in India in January 2024. Filming locations include Dover UK doubling as South Africa and Whitby in the UK. It was shot at locations in Gujarat. The shooting of season 1 was completed by August 2024.

== Release ==
The series premiered at the 50th Toronto International Film Festival on 17 September, the first Indian series to do so.
