= Norman Burrell =

English cricketer and soldier

Personal information
- Full name: Norman Sidney John Burrell
- Born: 17 September 1900; Chelmsford, Essex, England
- Died: 7 November 1986 (aged 86); Havering, Essex, England
- Batting: Unknown
- Bowling: Unknown

Domestic team information
- Years: Team
- 1929/30: Europeans

Career statistics
| Competition | First-class |
|---|---|
| Matches | 2 |
| Runs scored | 7 |
| Batting average | 3.50 |
| 100s/50s | –/– |
| Top score | 7 |
| Balls bowled | 48 |
| Wickets | 0 |
| Bowling average | – |
| 5 wickets in innings | – |
| 10 wickets in match | – |
| Best bowling | – |
| Catches/stumpings | 1/– |
- Source: ESPNcricinfo, 5 November 2023

Norman Sidney John Burrell (17 September 1900 — 7 November 1986) was an English first-class cricketer and an important figure in colonial cricket in Lahore.

Burrell was born at Chelmsford in September 1900 and was educated at Brentwood School. He served as a non-commissioned officer in the nascent Royal Air Force in the closing stages of the First World War. Following the war, he worked as a clerk in the insurance industry. His career took him to British India, where he resided at Lahore. Burrell was an important figure in the Lahore Gymkhana Club, becoming its cricket secretary in 1927. Whilst in Lahore, he featured twice in first-class cricket, firstly for the Punjab Governor's XI against Northern India in March 1928, and later for the Europeans cricket team against the Muslims in the 1929–30 Lahore Tournament. In these matches, he scored 7 runs and went wicketless. Burrell played club cricket in Northern India, and alongside Roland Ingram-Johnson, he was the only club cricketer to pass 1,000 runs for the season in 1927. He married Mary Gillert in April 1934 at All Saints Church, Srinagar.

Following the Partition of India, he played a role alongside George Abell in getting the newly-formed Pakistan national cricket team recognised by the Imperial Cricket Conference, with their elevation to Test status coming in 1952. Having left Lahore in 1946, Burrell returned to Essex, where he became bursar at Brentwood School until his retirement in 1968. He died at Havering in November 1986.
