= The Indian Ideology =

2012 book by Perry Anderson

- First edition
- Author: Perry Anderson
- Subject: Politics, history
- Published: 2012 (Three Essays Collective)
- Publication place: India
- Pages: vi, 184
- ISBN: 978-81-88789-90-0; 978-81-88789-92-4

The Indian Ideology is a 2012 book by the British Marxist historian Perry Anderson, published by Three Essays Collective. A near-polemical critique of the modern Indian nation-building project, the book consists of three essays originally published in the London Review of Books (LRB) in July–August 2012.

== Description ==
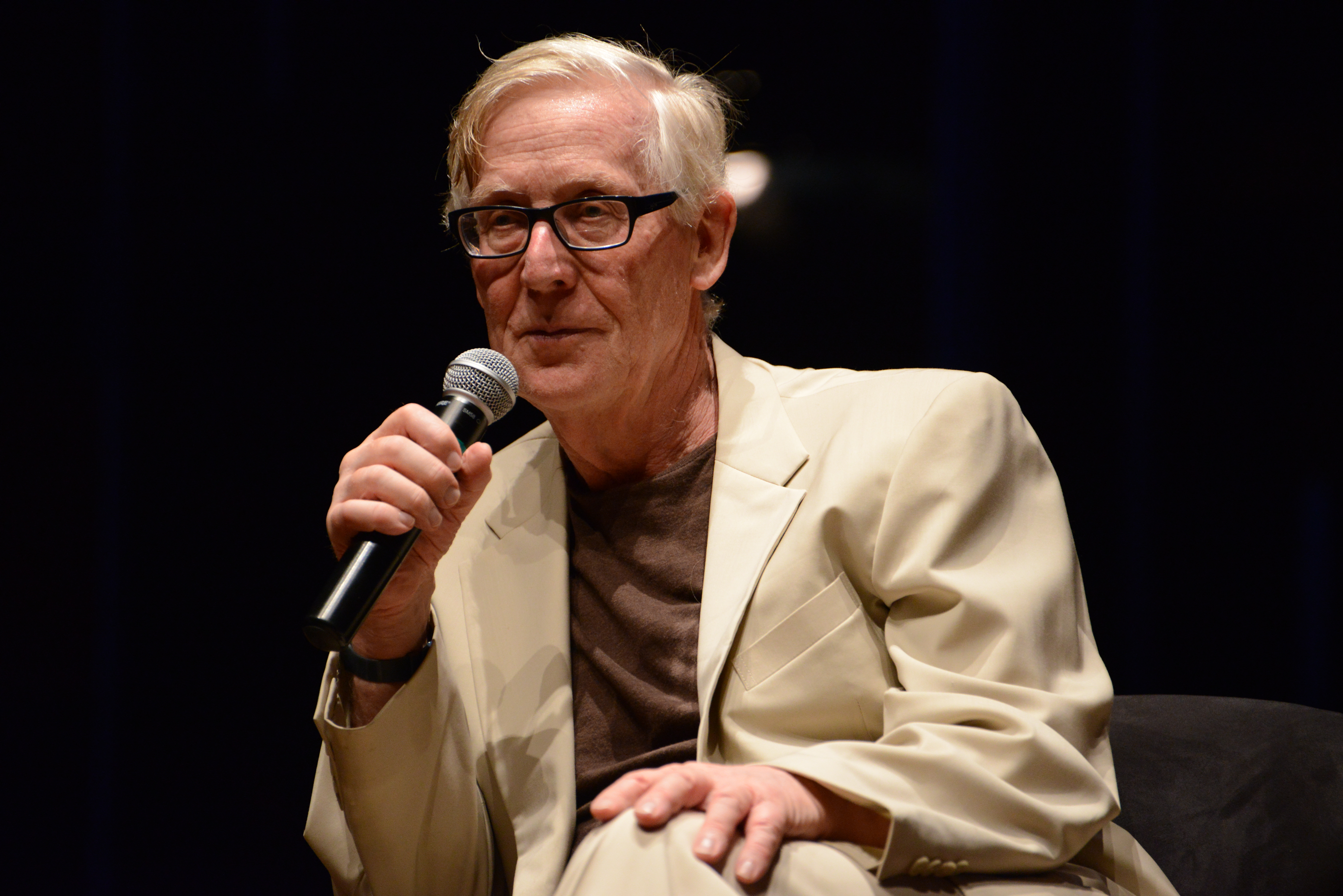
Anderson in 2012

In the first essay, "Independence", Anderson criticises M. K. Gandhi's role in the Indian independence movement, specifically his injection of religion into it to mobilise the masses. In "Partition", Anderson places the blame for the bloody Partition of India on the Hindu-dominated Indian National Congress, arguing that its claim to be the sole representative for all Indians led to the inevitable rise of the Muslim League and the two-nation theory. "Republic", the third and final essay, criticises independent India's first prime minister, Jawaharlal Nehru, and his legacy—a deeply unequal republic dominated by his descendants, where caste and religion remain entrenched in civic life.

Asked by Praful Bidwai in an interview to sum up The Indian Ideology, Anderson said the book "advances five main arguments that run counter to conventional wisdom in India today":

Firstly, that the idea of a subcontinental unity stretching back six thousand years is a myth. Secondly, that Gandhi’s injection of religion into the national movement was ultimately a disaster for it. Thirdly, that primary responsibility for Partition lay not with the Raj, but Congress. Fourthly, that Nehru’s legacy to Republic was far more ambiguous than his admirers will admit. Lastly, that Indian democracy is not contradicted by caste inequality, but rather enabled by it.

Gandhi: A Political and Spiritual Life by Kathryn Tidrick became the centre of a controversy since Perry Anderson called it the most important biography in The Indian Ideology. Anderson's book criticises the statist idea of India created by Indian historians which has made Gandhi into a saint who cannot be criticised. He said in the interview given to The Outlook magazine

"Tidrick’s biography of Gandhi is an extraordinarily careful, calm and courageous work. Not just I, but any serious student of this historical figure, would have more to learn about his outlook from her work than from any other extant study of him —the vast majority of Gandhiana being, to one degree or another, hagiographic. "

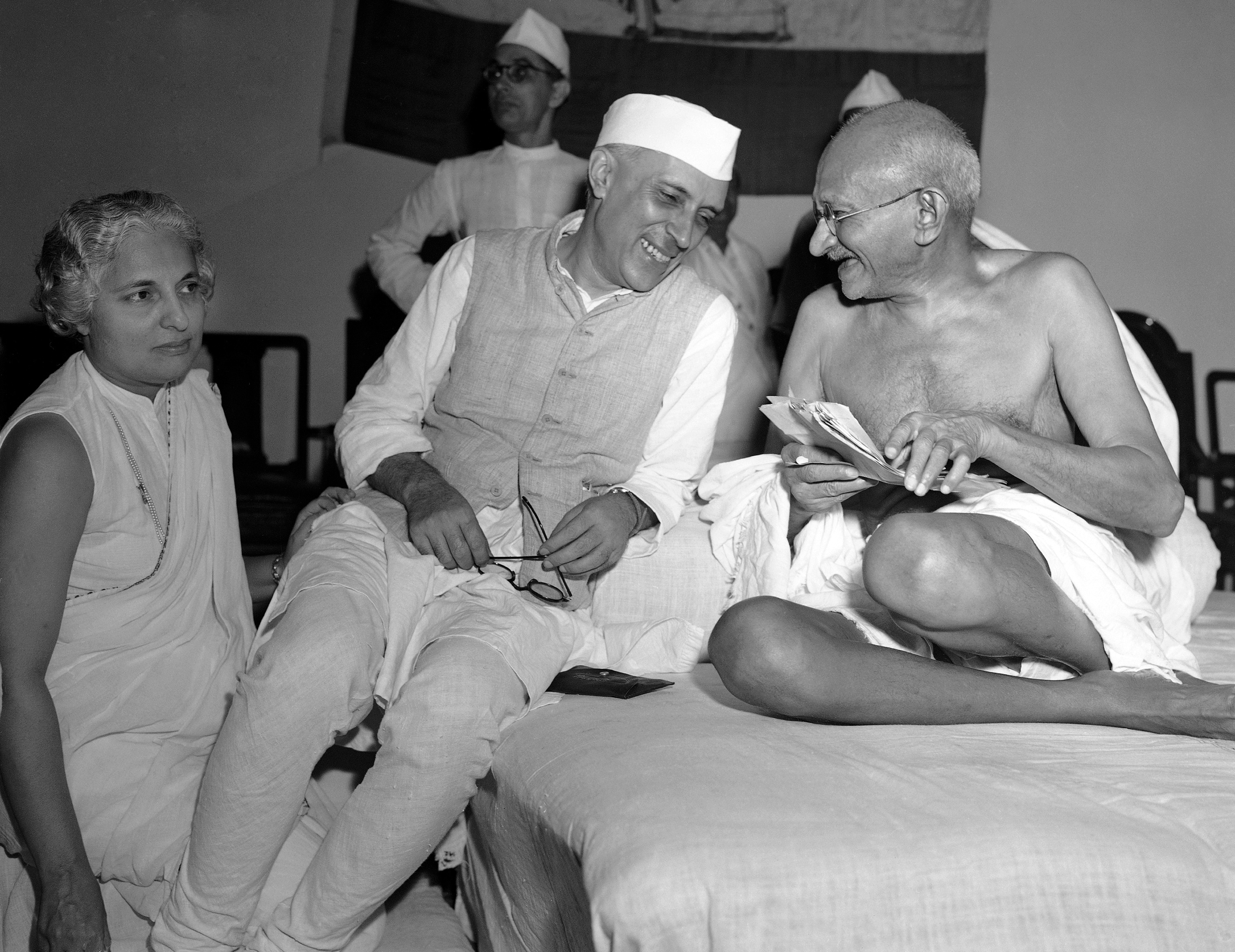
Jawaharlal Nehru and Mahatma Gandhi, seen here in 1942, who come in for severe criticism in The Indian Ideology.

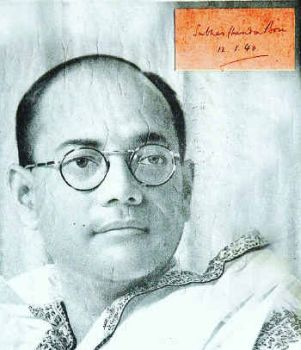
For Anderson, Subhas Chandra Bose was "the only leader Congress ever produced who united Hindus, Muslims and Sikhs in a common secular struggle".

== Reception ==
Following the essays' original publication, the LRB received several letters of praise as well as criticism from scholars in India and abroad. When they were collected in book form as The Indian Ideology by Three Essays Collective, a small Gurgaon-based publisher of scholarly material, the work received several reviews in the print and digital media.

=== Positive ===
Pankaj Mishra affirms that Anderson has found self-delusion in the Indian claims of uniqueness. While Anderson's critics accuse him of "quasi-imperialist condescension, Orientalist caricature and ignorance" Mishra believes that these accusation are confuted because he has expended even more criticism on the British ruling class. Mishra states that it is difficult to argue with Anderson's findings and is at times unanswerable on the Indian military occupation of Kashmir, leaves readers struck by the evidence of the role of the upper-caste Hindus in Indian politics and displays awkward facts about the roles of Nehru and Gandhi in the Partition of India to their admirers.

=== Mixed ===
Ravi Palat reviewed of the work as a "sure-footed" survey of the Indian independence movement and modern India, wherein Anderson debunked many liberal myths around the personalities of Gandhi and Nehru and also those around Indian democracy and unity. Palat found Anderson's insights to be incisive and praised his attention to detail. At the same time Palat faults Anderson for his recourse to the "great man" theory and eurocentric prejudices.

=== Negative ===
Associate Professor Kavita Philips from the University of California writes in Social History that Anderson's presentation is a polemical survey of modern India. Anderson collects a "dismal record" for India and attributes India's failings to ideological nationalism upheld by both Indian politicians and Indian scholars. Philips observes that many Indian scholars, both right-wing and left-wing, "turned away" from the book and even before its publication the preceding LRB essays received a "storm of criticism" from Indian scholars.

Indian historian Irfan Habib criticised the essays for its selective presentation of facts and even distortion of them, a neglect of the colonial context in which the independence movement was waged, and the bypassing of the role of Muslim League in India's partition. He regards Perry Anderson following in the footsteps of the Cambridge School historians such as Anil Seal, for example, in regarding the nationalist movement as the movement of the elites (or higher castes), ignoring its mobilisation of the peasantry and workers, its attack on untouchability, and the fundamental rights resolution adopted by Congress in 1931 in Karachi. Regarding partition, he writes, "even before the 1946 elections, the Congress had agreed to parity with the Muslim League in ministerial positions at the Centre... what more could the Congress do?" He states that the Hindu Code enacted in 1955–1956 effectively overturned two millennia of dharmashastra ideals in two years, hardly a mark of buttressing Hindu elitism as alleged by Anderson.

Nivedita Menon penned a stinging critique of the work, and was of the opinion that it should not have even passed the peer-review stage. Sudipta Kaviraj echoed similar views and deemed it to be laden with colonial bias. Partha Chaterjee found the work to be essentially childish and ignorant of developments in Indian historiography. Historian Ananya Vajpeyi had earlier critiqued Anderson's essays as a project resembling a "neo-imperial" venture, which she claimed produced a caricature of India's past.

== See also ==
- The German Ideology, the Karl Marx work whose title inspired The Indian Ideology

The following books were criticised by Anderson for "shar[ing] with the rhetoric of the state itself ... the centrality of four tropes in the official and intellectual imaginary of India":

- The Rediscovery of India by Meghnad Desai
- India after Gandhi and Makers of Modern India by Ramachandra Guha
- The Burden of Democracy by Pratap Bhanu Mehta
- The Argumentative Indian by Amartya Sen
- The Idea of India by Sunil Khilnani
