= Lahore Tournament =

Indian cricket competition (1923–1930)

The Lahore Tournament was an Indian cricket competition, nominally annual, that was held in each of the seasons from 1922/23 to 1929/30, apart from 1926/27. A total of 18 matches were played, all first-class and all at the Lawrence Gardens ground in Lahore. The format was similar to the Bombay Quadrangular and the Madras Presidency Match as the competing teams were the Europeans, the Hindus, the Muslims and the Sikhs. The Sikhs were unique to the Lahore Tournament and their team withdrew after the 1925/26 edition.

There was not a Parsis team in Lahore where, unlike in Bombay and Karachi, their community was too small. Ramachandra Guha has commented on the "fluidity" of communities in that the Sikhs in Bombay were willing to play for the Hindus team there, but not in Lahore which had been their capital until 1840.

The 1922/23 tournament was won by the Europeans, whose team included Wilfred Rhodes. In the final, they defeated the Muslims by 169 runs, although Rhodes scored only 14 runs (8 and 6). He did take five wickets in the match (3 for 31 and 2 for 36) but the Europeans' match-winner was fast-medium bowler Frederick Shaw, a British Army officer, who took fourteen wickets (7 for 30 and 7 for 53). Rhodes spent six winter seasons in India during the 1920s, his patron being Bhupinder Singh of Patiala, later the founder of the Ranji Trophy.

The Muslims reached the final again in 1923/24 and this time were successful as they defeated the Hindus by 4 wickets. Their best player was Abdus Salaam, who took 6 for 69 and 6 for 81. The Muslims won again in 1924/25, defeating Patiala's Sikhs by 6 wickets. They tried for a hat-trick of victories in 1925/26, but the final against the Europeans ended in a draw after the second day was lost to rain. Their all-rounder Syed Nazir Ali, who later played Test cricket for India, had an outstanding match nonetheless. He took 7 for 93 in the first innings, when the Europeans were all out for 292. He then scored 105 as the Muslims made 272. The Europeans struggled to 83 for 6 as time ran out and Nazir Ali took 2 for 27.

There was no tournament in 1926/27 and, when it returned in 1927/28, the Sikhs had withdrawn so that it became a triangular event. The Hindus (328 and 20/0) won in 1927/28, convincingly defeating the Muslims (177 and 167) by 10 wickets. The 1928/29 final was the most one-sided of all as the Muslims thrashed the Europeans by an innings and 74 runs. The Europeans won the toss and decided to bat first, but they were bowled out for 105, Mohammad Jahangir Khan, still only 19 years old, taking 6 for 49. The Muslims then amassed 389/2 declared after an unbroken third wicket partnership of 246 by Syed Wazir Ali (153 not out) and Feroz-ud-din (140 not out). The Europeans did better in their second innings and doubled their previous total by scoring 210 all out, Jahangir Khan taking 4 for 48 for a match return of 10 for 97. In the last-ever tournament, 1929/30, the Muslims (183 and 96/7) retained their title with a hard-fought three-wicket victory over the Hindus (100 and 178).
