= The Rest (Bombay) cricket team =

Former Indian cricket team that played in the Bombay Pentangular

The Rest was an Indian first-class cricket team which took part in the annual Bombay Pentangular from 1937–38 to 1945–46. It comprised those players who did not fit into any of the teams that took part in the Quadrangular, including Catholics, Jews and mixed-race Anglo-Indians. Several leading players from Ceylon also took part. The team reached the final of the Pentangular twice, in 1940–41 and 1943–44. In the 1943–44 final Vijay Hazare scored 309 out of the team's total of 387.

The Rest also played two first-class matches in the one-off Amritsar Tournament, competing against the Hindus and Muslims, in 1940–41.

In all, The Rest played 12 first-class matches, losing six and drawing six.

The Rest also competed in the five-team Sind Tournament in Karachi from 1919–20 to 1946–47, but these matches are not considered first-class. The Rest were unsuccessful in this tournament except in the last season, when they beat Parsees by two wickets in the final.

== Other teams called "The Rest" ==
Also in India, the annual Irani Cup fixture features Rest of India which plays against the current Ranji Trophy champions.

The appellation "The Rest" has been applied on an ad hoc basis to teams in other countries:

- In England, it is generally understood that teams which represent "the rest of England", usually assembled to play against a particular county club team, are called "England" or "England" or "The Rest". They are in fact Rest of England cricket teams and such teams have been organised since the 1730s. A team specifically called "The Rest" took part in a single wicket "fives" match on Monday, 6 June 1748, playing against Addington at the Artillery Ground; this appears to be the first instance of the name. A team called "The Rest" played a combined Nottinghamshire and Yorkshire team in 1883. Between then and 1997, "The Rest" teams played irregular first-class matches. At the end of most seasons from 1901 to 1960, "The Rest" played the winner of the County Championship in a first-class match.
- In Australia, a team called The Rest played irregular first-class matches, usually against an Australian XI, between 1872–73 and 1939–40.
- In New Zealand, a team called "The Rest" played six first-class matches against a New Zealand XI between 1927–28 and 1981–82.
- In Pakistan, a team called "The Rest" played four first-class matches against a Pakistan XI between 1952–53 and 1969–70. In 2009–10 a team called "The Rest" competed in the RBS Pentangular Cup, finishing third.
- Teams called "The Rest" have also played first-class matches in the West Indies (two matches) and South Africa (one match).

== Sources ==
- Vasant Raiji, India's Hambledon Men, Tyeby Press, 1986
- Mihir Bose, A History of Indian Cricket, Andre-Deutsch, 1990
- Ramachandra Guha, A Corner of a Foreign Field - An Indian History of a British Sport, Picador, 2001
