= Palwankar Ganpat =

Indian cricketer

Palwankar Ganpat was an Indian first-class cricketer. He was the brother of the notable cricketers Palwankar Baloo, Palwankar Shivram and Palwankar Vithal. Like his brothers, Ganpat played for several clubs, including the Hindus team in the Bombay Quadrangular competition. The brothers' family name, Palwankar, comes from their native place 'Palwani' in Ratnagiri, Maharashtra. Ganpat died at the age of 27, succumbing to tuberculosis.
