= George Laverton =

English cricketer and British Army officer

Personal information
- Full name: George Aylmer Laverton
- Born: 29 December 1888; Westbury, Wiltshire, England
- Died: 8 February 1954 (aged 65); Wallingford, Berkshire, England
- Batting: Unknown
- Bowling: Unknown

Domestic team information
- Years: Team
- 1917/18–1918/19: Europeans

Career statistics
Competition	First-class
Matches	6
Runs scored	202
Batting average	18.36
100s/50s	–/1
Top score	51
Balls bowled	289
Wickets	2
Bowling average	83.00
5 wickets in innings	–
10 wickets in match	–
Best bowling	1/1
Catches/stumpings	6/–
- Source: ESPNcricinfo, 25 November 2022

George Aylmer Laverton (29 December 1888 – 8 February 1954) was an English first-class cricketer and British Army officer.

A member of the Laverton milling family of Westbury, Wiltshire, he was the son of William Henry Laverton. He was educated at Harrow School, where he played for the school cricket team. Laverton was commissioned into the British Army as a second lieutenant in February 1906, but later resigned his commission in December 1912. He played minor counties cricket for Wiltshire in 1911, making two appearances in the Minor Counties Championship. He served in the First World War with the Wiltshire Regiment, being appointed to the regiment in December 1914 with the temporary rank of lieutenant. He relinquished this temporary rank in April 1917, but was granted the rank in full the following month.

Serving with the Regiment in British India, he was appointed aide-de-camp to Lord Willingdon, the Governor of Bombay in February 1917. Laverton played first-class cricket whilst serving in India, making six appearances in 1917 and 1918; two of these came for the Europeans in the Bombay Quadrangular, with a further two coming for the Lord Willingdon's XI. He additionally made an appearance each for a combined Europeans and Parsees team, and for England against India. In his six first-class matches, he scored 202 runs at an average of 18.36; he made one half century, a score of 51 on his first-class debut for the Europeans against the Parsees in 1917. Laverton relinquished his commission in the Wiltshire Regiment in December 1921. Besides playing cricket, he was a keen naturalist. Laverton died in February 1954 at Wallingford, Berkshire.
