= Jagadindra Nath Roy =

Zamindar of Natore

Maharaja Jagadindra Nath Roy Bahadur (Moitra) (20 October 1868 – 5 January 1925) known as the Maharaja of Natore was a noted zamindar of Natore from Bengal. He was also noted for his contribution to the game of cricket in British India.

== Family ==
He was the adopted son of Govind Chandra Nath Ray (Moitra), the Zamindar of Natore, a member of the Rajshahi Raj family, who died childless and Brajasundari, his widow adopted Jagadindranath at age of fifteen. The personal title of Maharaja was bestowed upon him in 1877. He later made Calcutta his home. Natore Rajbari, the Natore Raj family's ancestral home since the time of Rani Bhabani is now a protected monument of Bangladesh.

== Career and patronage ==
He was a patron of art and sports including the Town Club of Calcutta and the Bengal Gymkhana. He was editor of a monthly journal titled Manasi o Marmabani and earned a reputation as a journalist.

=== Cricket ===
He was a great cricket enthusiast and one of the active committee members of the Calcutta Cricket Club. In 1890, he promoted his own cricket team known as Natore. He was a great nationalist and his team consisted of Indian members. He promoted the Natore Stadium, a large cricket venue in his hometown of Natore and a sprawling cricket stadium, called Natore Garden in Calcutta at Ballygunge, which rivaled the Eden Gardens Stadium also in Calcutta. He also roped in prominent Indian players of his time, like Mehta, Baloo, Shivram, Yeshwant, Ganpat Palwankar, Vithal Palwankar, Sheshacari, K. N. Mistry, Warden, H.L. Semper, Saradaranjan and his brothers, Muktidaranjan, Kuladaranjan, and Pramodaranjan. Moni Das, another noted cricket player of the era from Bengal, was also patronized by the Maharaja. Although the Maharaja had only one eye, he would bat and field himself and was a good cricket player. His son, Kumar Jogindra Nath was also a good cricket player. The Natore team boasted a nationalist spirit and the team included many noted Dalit cricketers of the era. He adopted Srishchandra, a young but poor cricket talent and saved the life of an aspiring talent of Bengal. The Natore team promoted by him rivaled the team of Cooch Behar which was promoted by Maharaja Sir Nripendra Narayan Bhup Bahadur of Cooch Behar in Bengal. The Natore team lasted until 1945, patronized by his son after his death.

=== Politics ===
In 1901, he was made Chairman of the Congress Reception Committee at Calcutta and gave a noted lecture on India's state of political affairs and industries. He was elected as a member of the Bengal Legislative Council in 1913.

== Death ==
He died in 1925 survived by his son, Raja Joladhi Nath Roy, who succeeded him as Natore Raj.
