= Ramesan Mullassery =

- Born: Piravom, Kerala, India
- Occupations: Writer, short story writer, novelist
- Writing career
- Notable works: Gobaraha; Shootout; Mudiyett- Oru Padanam
- Notable awards: Vettoor Raman Nair Katha Sammanam (2023); M. P. Paul Short story Special Jury Prize (2025)

Ramesan Mullassery is an Indian writer, short story writer and novelist who writes in Malayalam language. He has written a number of books, covering children's literature, mythological and biblical stories, sports -based novels and studies in ancient art forms and culture. He received the Vettoor Raman Nair Katha Sammanam in 2023. He is also a recipient of the 2025 M. P. Paul Short story Special Jury Prize.

Mullassery, born in Piravom, in Ernakulam district of the south Indian state of Kerala, served in Kerala Government service and superannuated from service as Tehsildar. His first book, Injury Time was published in 2017, a novel with football as background which was followed by Arjuna Kathakal, published the next year, which is a compilation of stories from Mahabharata for children. Barbareekam, a novel based on a character of Mahabharata, named Barbareekan, Kalamboor Republic, a novel on the pre-independent Kerala, Shootout, another novel with football as the background, Gobaraha, inspired by the life of Palwankar Baloo, the legendary cricketer and political activist, Namaan, Sandehiyude Suvisesham a novel fashioned out of the Old Testament story of Namaan, and another novel by name, Bhoopadathil Illathe Poyavar, based on nomadic lives, Charvakanmar Undakunnathu, a short story anthology are his other works. He has also written a book, Mudiyett - Oru Padanam, which is a study on an ancient Kerala artform of the same name and published by Kerala Sahithya Akademi. Mullassery, who lives in Piravom, has also written several short stories and articles in contemporary periodicals.

== Bibliography ==
Title	Year	Genre
Injury Time	2017	Novel
Arjuna Kathakal	2018	Children's literature
Barbareekam	2018	Short story anthology
Kalamboor Republic	2018	Novel
Charvakanmar Undakunnathu	2022	Short story anthology
Shootout	2022	Novel
Namaan, Sandehiyude Suvisesham	2022	Novel
Gobaraha	2023	Novel
Bhoopadathil Illathe Poyavar	2023	Novel
Mudiyett	2025	Classical study

== See also ==
- Karunakaran (Malayalam writer)
- Palwankar Baloo
