= Kekhashru Mistry =

Indian cricketer

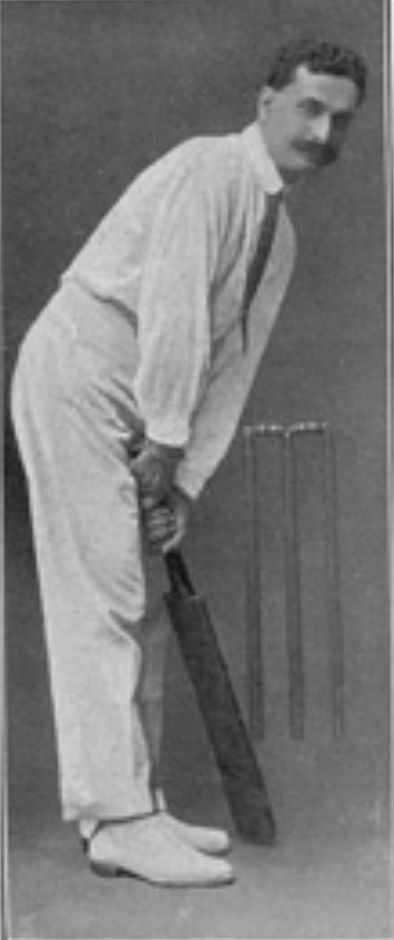

Personal information
- Full name: Kekhashru Maneksha Mistry
- Born: 7 November 1874; Bombay, British India
- Died: 22 July 1959 (aged 84); Bombay, India
- Batting: Left-handed
- Bowling: Left-arm medium
- Role: All-rounder

Domestic team information
- Years: Team
- 1893/94–1927/28: Parsees

Career statistics
| Competition | First-class |
|---|---|
| Matches | 39 |
| Runs scored | 1,600 |
| Batting average | 23.52 |
| 100s/50s | 0/10 |
| Top score | 95 |
| Balls bowled | 4003 |
| Wickets | 104 |
| Bowling average | 13.17 |
| 5 wickets in innings | 6 |
| 10 wickets in match | 2 |
| Best bowling | 8/70 |
| Catches/stumpings | 34/– |
- Source: ESPNcricinfo, 30 November 2021

Colonel Kekhashru Maneksha Mistry (7 November 1874 – 22 July 1959) (Note: Mistry's name has also been referenced as Keki Manikji Mistri, Keki M. Mistri, and K. M. Mistri in reports from the period.) was an Indian cricketer who was a member of the first all-Indian cricket team to tour England in 1911. A left-handed batsman and a left-arm bowler, he was considered one of India's first all-rounders. Mistry was a member of the Parsees cricket team in the Bombay Presidency tournaments and also played for the Maharaja of Patiala's team.

Mistry was an aide to the maharaja, Bhupinder Singh of Patiala, an association that continued until the maharaja's death, and was referred to as the 'grand old man of Indian cricket'.

== Biography ==
Mistry was born on 7 November 1874 in Bombay, then in British India, into a Parsee family.

Mistry toured England with the first all-Indian team led by the 19-year-old Maharaja Bhupinder Singh of Patiala in 1911. He was the maharaja's aide-de-camp during the tour and was forced to return to India with him mid-way after the maharaja's surgery for tonsillitis. He only played in three of the tour matches, scoring 78 runs in an innings against the Marylebone Cricket Club (MCC) at Lord's. In the Wisden report on the tour the almanack wrote that "a better result might have been obtained if Mistry – unquestionably a high-class batsman – had been able to play right through the summer."

Mistry had served the previous Maharaja of Patiala, Rajinder Singh. Following the maharaja's death, the British government in India acted quickly and took charge of the succession of the nine-year-old Bhupinder Singh. Major James Dunlop Smith was appointed to manage the affairs of the young maharaja and removed all of the previous maharajah's appointees except Mistry, who had been the guardian of Bhupinder Singh. Mistry stayed on in this position after being deemed trustworthy and of 'sound' disposition by the British officials. The young prince also took a liking to Mistry and the association would continue into the maharajah's playing years.

In addition to representing the all-Indian cricket team, Mistry was a member of the Parsees cricket team in the Bombay Presidency tournament and played for the Maharaja of Patiala's team. He scored at least one double century for Patiala, though the matches did not enjoy first-class status. His highest score was 255 runs, scored in 1898 against Ambala, an innings which included a 376-run partnership with Ranjitsinhji. He was a left-handed batsman and a left-arm bowler, and was considered one of India's first all-rounders.

Mistry continued playing into his fifties, including captaining the second all-India team against the visiting MCC team led by Arthur Gilligan in 1926. Mistry scored a half-century with his innings being described by The Times of India as 'great and courageous'. His eighth-wicket partnership with D. B. Deodhar helped the team draw the game. He played his last Bombay Quadrangular tournament game in 1927/28 captaining the Parsees against the Muslims and scored 36 runs in his last innings.

After his retirement, he was an umpire, and chairman of the Indian selection committee. He remained a close aide to the Maharaja of Patiala until Singh's death in 1938. Mistry was referred to as the 'grand old man of Indian cricket' and as the 'Clem Hill of Indian cricket', a reference to the Australian cricketer Clem Hill, a name that was given to him by Ranjitsinhji. In his book Stray Thoughts on Indian Cricket, J. M. Framjee Patel quoted English cricketers J. T. Hearne and Bill Brockwell as having compared his play to that of Ranji, going on to say "he seems to attain the maximum of power with the minimum of exertion".

Mistry died on 22 July 1959 in Bombay. He was aged 84.
