= B. Jayaram =

Indian cricketer

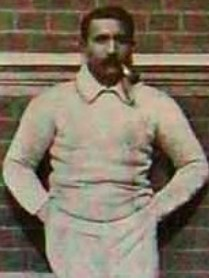

Personal information
- Full name: Bangalore Jayaram
- Born: 23 April 1872; Bangalore, Kingdom of Mysore, British India
- Died: 4 December 1936 (aged 64); Bangalore, Kingdom of Mysore, British India
- Batting: Right-handed
- Bowling: Right-arm slow

Domestic team information
- Years: Team
- 1903–1904: London County

Career statistics
Competition	First-class
Matches	12
Runs scored	340
Batting average	14.78
100s/50s	0/2
Top score	57
Balls bowled	42
Wickets	0
Bowling average	–
5 wickets in innings	–
10 wickets in match	–
Best bowling	–
Catches/stumpings	5/–
- Source: ESPNcricinfo, 30 November 2021

Bangalore Jayaram (23 April 1872 – 4 December 1936) was an Indian cricketer who had represented the London County Cricket Club in the early 1900s, and was also a part of the All-Indian cricket team in England in 1911.

== Early life ==
Jayaram was born on 23 April 1872 in Bangalore in the then princely state of Kingdom of Mysore in the southern region of modern-day India. He studied geology at Central College and obtained his Bachelor of Arts degree. At the college, he was a contemporary of C. Rajagopalachari, who would later go on to become India's Governor-General. Rajagopalachari would describe Jayaram as his boyhood hero owing to his cricketing prowess.

During his time at Central College he had developed as a right handed all-rounder. He famously scored 185 runs against the Yorkshire Regiment in 1891 and led his team to an unlikely win over the visitors. The game, however, was not granted first-class status. Jayaram was the first Indian member of the Bangalore Gymkhana Cricket Club.

Historian Ramachandra Guha notes of a quote from Jayaram's British principal from the time, recognizing his talent saying, "Had he the same opportunities as WG Grace he would have been as great, for he had an eye as quick and a wrist as supple as the Doctor’s." British cricketing magazine Wisden, noted his playing style in the 1890s wrote that he had "acquired the reputation of being about the best batsman in Southern India, who never played any bowler from behind the batting crease." During the same period, an article in Cricket magazine's 1898 edition wrote, "There were occasions when Indian batsmen of the 1890s such as B Jayaram of Bangalore were seen in England as ‘plucky’ on account of their playing without protective equipment. Jayaram's role in the defeat of an English team was noted with admiration by cricket writers in England."

== Career ==
=== First-class Cricket ===
Jayaram started his career with the Mysore Civil Service after finishing his college in 1895 working for the state's geological department. He was sent to London to study at the Royal School of Mines. During his time in London, he met English cricketer W. G. Grace and made an impression with his cricketing prowess. The press reports from the period compared him to Indian prince Ranjitsinhji.

Jayaram played for London County Cricket Club and was a regular at the club's nets. He made his first-class debut for the club in 1903 playing against Surrey at The Oval. He was selected on the back of a 118 run innings that he had for the club, the previous week, in a minor match that was famously watched by Ranjitsinhji. Jayaram did not have a memorable debut scoring just 5 and 3 in the two innings. The match itself, scheduled by W. G. Grace, was interrupted by adverse weather conditions including snow, owing to an mid-April start. London county lost the match by eight wickets. In 1904, when the visiting South African team played London County, at the Crystal Palace, he scored 14 and 5, with the team losing by 10 wickets. Jayaram played four matches for the county scoring a total of 57 runs at an average of 8.14.

Jayaram returned to England as a part of the All-Indian cricket team in 1911, where he scored highest for the visitors in a game against Lancashire at Old Trafford. He scored 23 and 36, while the team was dismissed for 85 and 94, losing the test by 9 wickets. The visiting team went on to play against Surrey and Yorkshire, losing both matches. Jayaram scored 57 at The Oval and followed it with a 53 at the Hull cricket ground. During the same tour he scored 11 and 22 in the game against Warwickshire at Birmingham, while the team lost by 10 wickets. He had a successful run during the team's matches in Scotland and Ireland, where he scored 30 and 81 against Scottish Universities at Perth, 78 against Woodbrook Cricket Club at Bray, and 57 against Ulster at Belfast. However, these matches were not granted first-class status. At the end of the tour his first-class record had him scoring 283 runs at an average of 17.68, and non first-class games he had scored 324 at an average of 27 runs per innings.

His first-class career ended with a total of 340 runs scored at an average of 14.78.

=== Mashie Lodge ===
Jayaram was also the owner of the Mashie Lodge, an iconic and "quaint" building on Bangalore's Lalbagh Road. The building was built to English design on land over one and half acres and was built by Kolar Gold Fields contractor, Ooragam Bianna. The house was named after his favourite golf club, the Mashie Niblick. The lodge's gardens won the first prize at the Bangalore Horticulture shows. The lodge itself drew praise for its architecture, with the Yuvaraja (transl. Prince) of Mysore sending his acquaintances to study the building's design while he was building his own house. The lodge was also noted as "the best maintained and decorated premises" for the visit of Prince of Wales in 1921. Dance and dinner parties at the lodge brought the ultra-westernized elite of the city including the English, the Iyengars, Coorgis, and the Bengalis, together with couples dancing the waltz. Dinners included champagne, imported wines, and liqueurs, and was followed by ballroom dancing. Catering for these parties would be handled by Spencer and Co, with food including canned products from Heinz, and other items including chicken biryani, fish, prawns and pickles, served on banana leaves on white linen covered tables.

The building was later renovated and converted into the Chennamma Memorial School.

In 1916, Jayaram was appointed the director of the Mysore Geological Department. He retired from the geological department in 1927. After his retirement, he set up a farm around 16 miles from Bangalore on the way to Nandi Hills. In the orchard he had apples imported from Australia, and planted.

== Personal life ==
Jayaram was married to Lakshmidevi. Having spent time in Bangalore and in England, he was noted to have been westernized to being referred to as a British Sahib in India. Contrary to orthodox Indian Hindu traditions, he was known to eat from a can of bully beef at lunch, with a dedicated chef serving him western food in a separate dining room at his lodge. He was also an accomplished violinist. He bought a pair of violins from Italy which were over a hundred years old on his return from the British Isles in 1923.

Jayaram died on 4 December 1936 at his farm in Bangalore. He was aged 64.
