= Gandhi Before India =

Biographical book by Ramachandra Guha

- First edition cover
- Author: Ramachandra Guha
- Subject: Biography
- Published: 2 October 2013 (Penguin India)
- Publication place: India
- Pages: 688
- ISBN: 9780670083879
- Followed by: Gandhi: The Years That Changed the World

Gandhi Before India is a 2013 book by the Indian historian Ramachandra Guha, the first part of a two-volume biography of Mohandas Karamchand Gandhi. The book deals with Gandhi's life up to his return to India following a 21-year period as a lawyer and civil-rights activist in South Africa. During this period in South Africa, Gandhi experienced discrimination that all coloured people there faced, including the Indian community he became a part of. In response to the government's policies he developed Satyagraha, a form of protest that translates loosely to "truth force".

Gandhi Before India was first published by Penguin India on 2 October 2013, Gandhi's birth anniversary. The book's title alludes to Guha's India After Gandhi (2007). Gandhi Before India was mostly well received by critics, both in the mainstream media and in scholarly journals.

== Translations ==
Gandhi Indiaku munp (literally meaning Gandhi Before India) is the Malayalam translation of this book. The Malayalam translation has been released by DC Books. ISBN 9789353902520

== See also ==
- Gandhi: The Years That Changed the World, Guha's 2018 sequel
