= Vithal Palwankar =

Indian cricketer (1884–1971)

Personal information
- Born: 1884 or 1886; India
- Died: 26 November 1971; Bombay, India
- Role: Batsman
- Relatives: Palwankar Baloo (brother); Palwankar Shivram (brother); Palwankar Ganpat (brother); Yeshwant Palwankar (nephew)

Domestic team information
- Years: Team
- 1910–11 to 1928–29: Hindus

Career statistics
Competition	First-class
Matches	44
Runs scored	2404
Batting average	35.35
100s/50s	5/11
Top score	149
Balls bowled	12
Wickets	0
Bowling average	–
5 wickets in innings	–
10 wickets in match	–
Best bowling	–
Catches/stumpings	16/–
- Source: CricketArchive, 1 July 2016

Vithal Palwankar (1884 or 1886 – 26 November 1971) was an Indian cricketer and a captain of the Hindus team. Vithal led the team to victories over the Mohammedan and European teams, where his captaincy and personal performance were praised. His four-year tenure (1923 to 1926) as captain was filled with similar successes and culminated with the Hindus winning the Quadrangular trophy.[1] He was the younger brother of the Indian spin bowler and activist Palwankar Baloo; his other brothers Palwankar Shivram and Palwankar Ganpat were also cricketers.

== Early years ==
Vithal was introduced to cricket by his brother Baloo, who later sent him to attend the Elphinstone College High School in Mumbai (then Bombay), where he began playing cricket seriously. He is credited with being the first Chamar castecaptain of the Hindus cricket team in the Bombay Quadrangular cricket competition.

== Prominence as a cricketer ==
In the following years, Vithal rose in the ranks of Indian cricketers as a stylish and skilled batsman, even as his elder brother Baloo enjoyed legendary status as a successful spin bowler. Despite the controversy over Baloo being passed over for the captaincy of the Hindu team, which was attributed by many to politics and caste discrimination, Vithal's career continued to progress. With his elder brothers ageing and approaching retirement, Vithal emerged as the future of the Palwankar family in cricket as well as one of the best talents in Indian cricket. In 1920, he and several other players protested the appointment of a Brahmin, D. B. Deodhar, as captain following the illness of the incumbent, M. D. Pai; with Baloo being dropped, most considered Shivram and Vithal to be the most senior players and leading candidates for the job. Critics attributed Deodhar's appointment to caste discrimination, and both Palwankar brothers, along with other rank-and-file cricketers withdrew from the team after publishing a letter making their protest public and criticising the selection committee for the "unsportsmanlike" decision. Supporters, rallied by the ongoing campaign against untouchability led by Mahatma Gandhi and other political leaders, raised money for the Palwankar brothers and petitioned for their inclusion in the team. When the recovered Pai returned to captaincy, both brothers were reinstated and Baloo selected to join the team as well. The brothers protested again when they were by-passed for the captaincy for the 1922 competition that was held in Pune.

== Captaincy ==
With the campaign against caste discrimination gaining nationwide support, the selection committee for the 1923 Quadrangular made history by appointing Vithal as the captain of the Hindus team, making him the first lower-caste Hindu to lead the team. Vithal led the team to thrilling victories over the Mohammedan and European teams, where his captaincy and personal performance were praised. His four-year tenure (1923 to 1926) as captain was filled with similar successes and culminated with the Hindus winning the Quadrangular trophy.

Being dropped in favour of younger players in 1929, Vithal continued playing for clubs before retiring from first-class cricket in 1932; his nephew Y. B. Palwankar also played first-class cricket. He left the Hindus two years before the formation of the first Indian national cricket team. After his retirement he continued with his job at the Great Indian Peninsular Railway, which he had joined after leaving school, while his eldest brother, Palwankar Baloo rose in Indian politics. Vithal died in Bombay on 26 November 1971.

== Vijay Merchant's views ==
Ramchandra Guha writes that Vijay Merchant, as a young boy, considered Vithal as his "hero and role model". He quotes Merchant writing:

Vithal': a slim, alert personality with that well-known green tweed hat on his head and a gracefully held bat in his hand that would swing easily when he reached the wicket ... From thousands of cricket lovers there would come the spontaneous cry: 'there comes Vithal'." "'Vithal': the moment one heard the name ... spectators would visualise all the grace and charm of Indian batsmanship ... With supple wrists, keen vision, perfect judgement of flight and agile footwork, Vithal had mastered the art of [batting]. He used to play his strokes with ease whether in front of the wicket or behind it. But one superb stroke of his that I cannot forget is the cover drive. Nowadays a lot of effort and power goes into this stroke because of the off-side cordon. But due to his timing Vithal used to score more runs on this side of the wicket, effortlessly, through perfect coordination of wrist and leg movements ... He used to score fast because of his art of placing the balls in the gap.

On his death Merchant wrote to the Palwankar's son; "Very few of his generation, with the handicap that he suffered from (so called "low-caste"), would have risen to such heights but for great determination and outstanding talent."
