= Kathryn Tidrick =

- Education: London University
- Occupation: Historian

Kathryn Tidrick is an English historian, psychologist and writer. She is a specialist in British colonial history and the history of political institutions in Asia. Her works have received praises from other historians. William Dalrymple called her "the author of two witty studies of British orientalism" in the Financial Times.

Tidrick was born and grew up in Britain. She studied psychology at university, not history, pursuing research. She obtained her doctoral degree from the University of London

She has written articles for the London Review of Books, and for the New York Times

== Gandhi - A Political and Spiritual Life ==
Tidrick's work on Mohandas Karamchand Gandhi's life has received much attention. In her book Tidrick argues that Gandhi's student life in London was his decisive and formative period where he acquired the ideas which would be put to use until his death. This point of view differs from more conventional understandings of Gandhi's intellectual inheritance that locates his ideas in Ancient India.

William Dalrymple called her work "Brilliant" and remarked that her research brought certain unexplored dimensions of Gandhi's intellectual life to light such as the influence of occultists of London "she locates the roots of Gandhi’s thought in the lunatic spiritualist fringe of late-Victorian England, among the occultists, high fibre-ists and mediums who flourished in late 19th-century London". Francis Robinson, Professor of the History of South Asia at the University of London, remarked that her study brought to the front the experimental aspects of Gandhi's life in its milieu which was Victorian.

Gandhi: A Political and Spiritual Life became the centre of a controversy since Perry Anderson called it the most important biography of M. K. Gandhi in his book The Indian Ideology. Anderson's book criticises the nationalist idea of India created by Indian historians which has made Gandhi into a saint who cannot be criticised. He said in an interview given to Outlook magazine

"Tidrick’s biography of Gandhi is an extraordinarily careful, calm and courageous work. Not just I, but any serious student of this historical figure, would have more to learn about his outlook from her work than from any other extant study of him —the vast majority of Gandhiana being, to one degree or another, hagiographic."

== Selected works ==
- Heart Beguiling Araby - The English Romance with Arabia ISBN 978-1-84885-146-7
- Empire and the English Character ISBN 978-1-84511-700-9
- Gandhi - A Political and Spiritual Life ISBN 978-1-84511-166-3
- ‘The Masai and Their Masters: A Psychological Study of District Administration’, African Studies Review, Vol. 23, No. 1 (Apr. 1980), pp. 15–31.
