= Palwankar Shivram =

Indian cricketer (1878–1941)

Babaji Palwankar Shivram (6 March 1878 – 28 December 1941) was an Indian cricketer who was one of the most successful players for the Hindus cricket team in the Bombay Quadrangular competition.

== Early years ==
Babaji Palwankar Shivram was born on 6 March 1878 in the city of Bhuj, in the modern Indian state of Gujarat. Completing his schooling in Mumbai (then Bombay), Shivram obtained employment with the Greater Indian Peninsular Railways. He was the brother of cricketer and social activist Palwankar Baloo and Palwankar Vithal, who was appointed a captain of the Hindus team.

== Cricket career ==
Shivram joined his elder brother Palwankar Baloo in playing first-class cricket in 1905, soon becoming one of the most famous sportsmen of the time, breaking caste barriers to excel in what was considered a sport of the upper classes and the British. He became one of the few so-called lower caste persons ever chosen to play for the Hindus team in the Bombay Quadrangular competition, the most prominent and popular cricket contest in India at the time. Mainly an off-break spin bowler, Shivram also developed as a valuable batsman, becoming an all rounder and was chosen along with Baloo to play for the All-India cricket team slated to tour England in 1911.

After his elder brother's retirement, Shivram and his younger brother Vithal became the most senior players in the Hindus team. In 1920, Shivram, Vithal and several other players protested the appointment of a Brahmin, D. B. Deodhar, as captain following the illness of the incumbent, M. D. Pai; with Baloo being dropped, most considered Shivram and Vithal to be the most senior players and leading candidates for the job. Critics attributed Deodhar's appointment to caste discrimination, and both Palwankar brothers, along with other rank-and-file cricketers withdrew from the team after publishing a letter making their protest public and criticising the selection committee for the "unsportsmanlike" decision. Supporters, rallied by the ongoing campaign against untouchability led by Mahatma Gandhi and other political leaders, raised money for the Palwankar brothers and petitioned for their inclusion in the team. When the recovered Pai returned to captaincy, both brothers were reinstated and Baloo selected to join the team as well. The brothers protested again when they were by-passed for the captaincy for the 1922 competition that was held in Pune.

Despite advancing age, Shivram continued to play for the Hindus under his younger brother Vithal, who had made history in 1923 by becoming a captain of the Hindus. Shivram finally retired at the end of the 1924–25 season. He died in Bombay on 28 December 1941.

== Statistics ==
- First-Class Career Batting and Fielding (1904/05-1924/25)

- Matches: 39 - Innings: 67 - Not Out: 7 - Runs: 1130 - Highest Score: 113* - Batting Average: 18.83 - 100s: 1 - 50s: 4 - Catches: 18

- First-Class Career Bowling (1908/09-1924/25)

- Balls: 2687 - Maiden overs: 85 - Runs: 1090 - Wickets: 53 - Best Bowling Figures: 4-31 - Bowling Average: 20.56 - Strike rate: 50.69 - Economy rate: 2.43
