= Gymkhana Ground, Bengaluru =

Multi purpose ground in Bengaluru, Karnataka, India

Gymkhana Ground
- Full name: Gymkhana Ground
- Former names: Rajendrasinhji Stadium
- Location: Bengaluru, Karnataka
- Owner: Bruhat Bengaluru Mahanagara Palike
- Operator: Bruhat Bengaluru Mahanagara Palike
- Capacity: 5,000

Construction
- Groundbreaking: 1888
- Opened: 1888

Website
- ESPNcricinfo

Gymkhana Ground is a multi purpose ground in Bengaluru, Karnataka. The ground is mainly used for organizing matches of football, cricket and other sports. The ground is one of the oldest cricket venues in Bengaluru and India. Previously, the ground is known as Rajendrasinhji Stadium. The ground hosted its match when Bangalore cricket team played against Madras cricket team.

The stadium has hosted eight Ranji Trophy matches from 1935 when Mysore cricket team played against Madras cricket team until 1952 but since then the stadium has hosted non-first-class matches.
