= Makers of Modern India =

Book by Ramachandra Guha

- First edition
- Author: Ramachandra Guha
- Language: English
- Published: 2010
- Publisher: Penguin India
- Publication place: India
- ISBN: 9780143419242

Makers of Modern India is a non-fiction book written by Indian historian-scholar Ramachandra Guha and published by Penguin India in 2010. The book features profiles of selected personalities that laid the foundation of modern India: Ram Mohan Roy, Syed Ahmad Khan, Jotirao Phule, Gopal Krishna Gokhale, Bal Gangadhar Tilak, Tarabai Shinde, Mahatma Gandhi, Rabindranath Tagore, B. R. Ambedkar, Mohammad Ali Jinnah, Periyar, Kamala Devi Chattopadhyay, Jawaharlal Nehru, M. S. Golwalkar, Rammanohar Lohia, Jayaprakash Narayan, C. Rajagopalachari, Verrier Elwin, and Hamid Dalwai.

The book has met with generally positive reviews.
