= Ion Campbell =

English cricketer

Ion Percy FitzGerald Campbell OBE (25 November 1890 – 25 December 1963) was an English first-class cricketer active 1910–34 who played for Surrey. He was born in Palampur, Punjab, and died in Redgorton, Perthshire. He was educated at Repton School and Hertford College, Oxford. During World War I he was an officer in the Hampshire Regiment and was mentioned in despatches. He was appointed an officer of the Order of the British Empire in 1919 "for valuable services rendered in connection with military operations in Siberia."
