= Ronojoy Sen =

Indian Political Scientist

Dr. Ronojoy Sen (born 1969) is an Indian political scientist and author. He is a Senior Research Fellow at the Institute of South Asian Studies and faculty at the South Asian Studies Programme, National University of Singapore. Sen formerly served as an editor at The Times of India for several years. He has additionally held visiting fellowships or positions at Cornell University, Wilson Center, National Endowment for Democracy, Washington, D.C the East-West Center Washington and the International Olympic Museum,Lausanne, Switzerland.

Sen's analysis has appeared in The Hindu, Times of India, Outlook, Foreign Policy and in interviews on Channel NewsAsia, BBC.

The Wall Street Journal describes Sen's second book Nation at Play: A History of Sport in India as an ambitious one that "examines Indian sports in a largely chronological manner and does not duck the more awkward questions, such as the perceived athletic limitations of Indians. The narrative has an attractive sweep to it, starting with the place of sports and martial competition in Hindu epics such as the Ramayana and Mahabharata.

Sen's most recent book was launched by Shashi Tharoor in December 2022 and discusses the Indian parliament, the Frontline refers to House of the People as '"a ringside view of democracy against the backdrop of larger social, political and policy changes". According to The Hindu, it "depicts in rich detail, the transformation this body has gone through in the last 17 Lok Sabhas" The Indian Express calls the book "rich in data and history...a wide ranging, nuanced view of the centrality of Parliament in India's socio political life"

In January 2023, Sen was a speaker at the Jaipur Literature Festival.

== Early life and education ==
In an interview, Sen said he was born and raised in Calcutta and he read history at Presidency College, Kolkata. Sen completed his Ph.D. in political science from University of Chicago.

== Books ==
- Baxi, Upendra; Sen, Ronojoy (2007). Legalizing Religion: The Indian Supreme Court and Secularism. Washington, DC: East-West Center Washington. ISBN 978-1-932728-56-9.
- Jeffrey, Robin; Sen, Ronojoy; Singh, Pratima (2012). More Than Maoism: Politics, Policies and Insurgencies in South Asia. New Delhi: ISAS, Institute of South Asian Studies. ISBN 978-81-7304-933-0.
- Sen, Ronojoy (31 January 2013). Articles of Faith: Religion, Secularism, and the Indian Supreme Court. OUP India. ISBN 978-0-19-808535-5.
- Sen, Ronojoy (2015). Nation at Play : A History of Sport in India. New York: Columbia University Press. ISBN 978-0-231-16490-0.
- Sen, Ronojoy (2022). House of the People : Parliament and the Making of Indian Democracy. Cambridge, United Kingdom: Cambridge University Press. ISBN 9781009180252.
