= Vettoor Raman Nair =

Malayalam language writer

- Born: Raman Nair; 5 July 1919; Pala, Kottayam district, Kerala
- Died: 11 August 2003 (aged 84)
- Occupation: Writer
- Spouse: Meenakshi Amma
- Children: 4
- Writing career
- Genres: Short story, Novel
- Notable works: Jeevikkan Marannupoya Sthre; Puzha
- Notable awards: Kerala Sahitya Akademi Award, Kerala Sahitya Akademi Award for Overall Contributions

Vettoor Raman Nair (5 July 1919 – 11 August 2003) was a Malayalam language writer from Kerala, India. He was the founding editor of humor magazine Pakkanar and founding chairman of the Pala Sahrudaya Samiti. He has received Kerala Sahitya Akademi Award for his short story collection Puzha and Kerala Sahitya Akademi Award for Overall Contributions in the field of Malayalam literature.

== Biography ==
Raman Nair was born on 5 July 1919 at Mutholi near Pala, Kottayam district to Kavanal Sankara Pillai and Paryath Narayaniamma. He did his schooling at Puliyannur, Kuruvinal, Kidangoor NSS high school. In 1938, he took part in the State Congress agitation. Since the beginning of Kerala Granthashala Sangam (Kerala Library Association), he was an active member of it for 25 years. He was a member of the Library Advisory Board formed by the Kerala government in 1956. He was the founding editor of humor magazine Pakkanar and founding chairman of the Pala Sahrudaya Samiti. He also worked as the editor of the newspaper Deenabandhu.

Since 1951, for 12 years he served on the Executive Committee and the Publication Committee of the Sahithyapravarthaka Sahakarana Sangam (Co-operative Society for Literary Publication). In 1962, he became the manager of India Press, and later became Publication Manager and General Manager. For a few years he served as the editor of Bharat Chandrika Weekly. He also served as the Managing Director of Sahrudaya books publishing company. He was a member of the Executive Committee of the Kerala Sahitya Akademi for 6 years and member of its General Council for 3 years. He was the Vice President of the Kerala Sahitya Parishad and in 1979 became a member of the Executive Committee of the Kerala Film Chamber.

He died on 11 August 2003 at the age of 84.

== Family ==
He and his wife Meenakshi Amma have four children.

== Literary contributions ==
=== Novels ===
- Jeevikkan Marannupoya Sthree, 1952 (Meaning: The Woman Who Forgot to Live, ISBN 9788126426508): This novel was translated into Kannada language. This novel later made into a Malayalam movie in 1974 directed by K. S. Sethumadhavan.
- Oru Verum Premakatha, 1987 (Meaning:Just a love story)

=== Travelogue ===
- Puri muthal Nasik vare, 1996 (Meaning:From Puri to Nashik,ISBN 8171306349)

=== Short story collection ===
- Puzha (Meaning:River)
- Thiranjedutha kathakal, 1966 (selected short stories)
- Asasthreeyamaya oru sneham,1958 (Meaning: One unscientific love)
- Eliyumpoochayum njanum, 1965 (Meaning: Mouse cat and me)
- Vishappum dahavum, 1950 (Meaning: Hunger and thirst)
- Randu divasam, 1949 (Meaning: two days)
- Thazvarakal, 1945 (Meaning: Valleys)
- Bodhanam, 1954
- Devadasi, 1959
- Antharangam 1947

== Awards and honours ==
- 1987 Kerala Sahitya Akademi Award (Puzha)
- Kerala Sahitya Akademi Award for Outstanding Contribution to Malayalam Literature
