= Gandhi: The Years That Changed the World, 1914–1948 =

2018 book by Ramachandra Guha

Gandhi: The Years That Changed the World, 1914-1948
- Author: Ramachandra Guha
- Language: English
- Genre: Biography
- Published: 11 September 2018
- Publisher: Penguin Allen Lane
- Publication place: India
- ISBN: 978-0-307-47479-7

Gandhi: The Years That Changed the World, 1914-1948 is a non-fiction book by Indian historian Ramachandra Guha (born 1958) published by Penguin Random House in September 2018. One of the most extensive biography on the sole icon of the Indian independence movement Mahatma Gandhi, it has garnered wide recognition and accolades. The book runs in excess of 1100 pages.
