= India After Gandhi =

Non-fictional book by Ramachandra Guha

India after Gandhi
- Cover of 10th anniversary edition
- Author: Ramachandra Guha
- Translator: Sushant Jha (Hindi)
- Language: English
- Subject: History of India
- Genre: Non-fiction
- Publisher: Ecco Press (HarperCollins) in the US, Picador in India
- Publication date: 24 July 2007
- Publication place: India
- Media type: Print (hardcover and paperback)
- Pages: 898 pp (First Edition), 919 pp (Revised and Updated Edition)
- ISBN: 978-0-330-50554-3

India After Gandhi: The History of the World's Largest Democracy is a non-fiction book by Indian historian Ramachandra Guha. First published by HarperCollins in August 2007.

The book covers the history of the India after it gained independence from the British in 1947. A revised and expanded edition was published in 2017.

== Background ==
In November 1997, Peter Straus, then head of Picador, met Ramachandra Guha and suggested that he write a history of independent India. Straus had read an article by Guha in the Oxford journal Past and Present. He suggested that since Indian historians typically stopped their narratives with Indian independence in 1947, a scholarly analysis of modern Indian history post-independence would be of interest. Guha signed a contract in March 1998, with a delivery date for the book specified for March 2002.

In writing the book, Guha consulted the private papers of several important Indian personalities, as well as newspaper records, housed at the Nehru Memorial Museum and Library, New Delhi. The private papers of Indian independence activist and politician C Rajagopalachari and P N Haksar, Indira Gandhi's principal secretary 1967 and 1973, were especially useful to Guha's research. Guha sent across his final draft to Straus in 2006, and the book was published in 2007.

=== Expanded edition ===
Guha re-organized Part Five chronologically (in the earlier edition this section followed a thematic approach), removed a chapter (A People's Entertainments), added two chapters based entirely on new material (Progress and its Discontents & The Rise of the BJP Systems), and rewrote the epilogue (A 50–50 Democracy) for the 10th anniversary edition.

== Contents ==
- Prologue: Unnatural Nation
- Part One: Picking up the Pieces

Freedom and Parricide—The Logic of Division—Apples in the Basket—A Valley Bloody and Beautiful—Refugees and the Republic—Ideas of India

- Part Two: Nehru's India

The Biggest Gamble in History—Home and the World—Redrawing the Map—The Conquest of Nature—The Law and the Prophets—Securing Kashmir—Tribal Trouble

- Part Three: Shaking the Centre

The Southern Challenge—The Experience of Defeat—Peace in Our Time—Minding the Minorities

- Part Four: The Rise of Populism

War and Succession—Leftward Turns—The Elixir of Victory—The Rivals—Autumn of the Matriarch—Life Without the Congress—Democracy in Disarray—This Son also Rises

- Part Five: A History of Events

Rights and Riots—A Multi-polar Polity—Rulers and Riches—Progress and its Discontents—The Rise of the BJP Systems

- Epilogue: A 50–50 Democracy

== Publication history ==
- First edition – 2007/2008
- 10th anniversary edition (2016/2017) – revised, expanded and updated (first updated edition)

=== Translations ===
India After Gandhi was translated into Hindi as Bharat Gandhi Ke Baad by India Today journalist Sushant Jha New Delhi. This book has been translated into Hindi in two volumes as Bharat: Gandhi Ke Baad and Bharat: Nehru Ke Baad and published by Penguin. The Tamil version of the book is published in the name Indhiya varalaaru Gandhikku pin - Part 1 & 2 by Kizhakku and translated by R. P. Sarathy. The Bengali version of the book is published in the name "গাঁধী-উত্তর ভারতবর্ষ" by Ananda Publishers Private Limited and translated by Ashish Lahiri.

== Reception ==
India after Gandhi was chosen Book of the Year by The Economist, The Wall Street Journal and Outlook Magazine, among others.

The book was one of the best non-fiction books of the decade (2010–2019) as per The Hindu.

The book won the 2011 Sahitya Akademi Award for English.
