= Palwankar Baloo =

Indian cricketer (1876–1955)

Personal information
- Full name: Palwankar Baloo
- Born: 19 March 1876; Dharwad, Bombay Presidency, British India
- Died: 4 July 1955 (aged 79); Bombay, Bombay State, India
- Bowling: Slow left-arm orthodox
- Role: Bowler
- Relatives: P Shivram (brother); P Ganpat (brother); P Vithal (brother)

Domestic team information
- Years: Team
- 1905–1921: Hindus
- FC debut: 8 February 1906 Hindus v Europeans
- Last FC: 8 December 1920 Hindus v Parsees

Career statistics
Competition	First-class
Matches	33
Runs scored	753
Batting average	13.69
100s/50s	0/3
Top score	75
Balls bowled	6,431
Wickets	179
Bowling average	15.21
5 wickets in innings	17
10 wickets in match	4
Best bowling	8/103
Catches/stumpings	12/–
- Source: ESPNcricinfo, 27 January 2009

Palwankar Baloo (19 March 1876 – 4 July 1955) was an Indian cricketer and political activist. In 1896, he was selected by Parmanandas Jivandas Hindu Gymkhana and played in the Bombay Quadrangular tournaments. He was employed by the Bombay Berar and Central Indian Railways, and also played for the latter's corporate cricket team. He played in the all-Indian team led by the Maharaja of Patiala during their tour of England in 1911 where Baloo's outstanding performance was praised.

== Early life ==
Palwankar Baloo was born in Dharwad, Bombay Presidency, British India on 19 March 1876 to a chambhar (chamar) family. Palwankar's family name comes from his native place 'Palwani' in Ratnagiri, Maharashtra. His father was a sepoy in the 112th Infantry Regiment of British Indian Army. Baloo played cricket with equipment left behind by officers stationed in Pune.

Baloo had three brothers, Palwankar Shivram, Vithal Palwankar and Palwankar Ganpat, who also became first-class cricketers.

== Cricket career ==
He started working as a groundsman maintaining the pitch for the Parsis in Pune and later at the British Poona Gymkhana where he occasionally bowled to J. G. Greig, an English batsman. He learned spin bowling.and because of Greig's influence he began to play for the Pune Hindu club.

In 1896, he moved to Bombay and was selected by Parmanandas Jivandas Hindu Gymkhana and played both Bombay Quadrangular tournaments.

He was employed by the Bombay Berar and Central Indian Railways, and also played for the latter's corporate cricket team.

He played in the all-Indian team led by the Maharaja of Patiala during their tour of England in 1911. The tour was a failure, but Baloo's outstanding performance was well praised. A left-handed spin bowler he took 114 wickets during the tour. He was known as the Rhodes of India.

Throughout his career in cricket, Baloo was not perceived as equal due to his lower caste background. He faced much discrimination because of this. Whilst he played at Pune, during the tea interval at matches his tea was brought outside to him in a disposable cup. He could not drink it in the pavilion. His lunch was served at a separate table. If he wanted to wash his face a fellow so-called lower caste attendant would bring him water in a corner. Things seem to have improved when he moved to Bombay and afterward but he was denied the captaincy of the Hindu team in the Quadrangular Tournament.

He is considered to be one of the greatest cricketers in Indian cricket history. His life has been documented in a book in Malayalam written by Ramesan Mullassery, titled Gobaraha.

== Politics ==
He was greatly influenced by Gandhian ideology and worked to bring Home Rule to India.

In the 1910s, Palwankar Baloo met B.R. Ambedkar and became his close friend. They admired each other and worked to improve the oppressed communities. However, in 1932, Baloo opposed Ambedkar's demand for separate electorates for the depressed classes. Later, he also signed the "Rajah-Moonje Pact" in opposition. He described the conversion of oppressed communities to other religions as 'suicidal' when Ambedkar expressed his intention to convert to Buddhism.

In 1933, Baloo unsuccessfully contested the Bombay Municipality constituency on the Hindu Mahasabha ticket. Four years later he joined Congress and contested the Bombay Legislative Assembly elections against Ambedkar, but lost.

He died in 1955. His funeral was attended by many national leaders as well as cricketers.

== See also ==
- Jim Thorpe
- Johnny Mullagh
- Jackie Robinson
