= Muslims cricket team =

Indian cricket team (1912–1946)

The Muslims cricket team was an Indian first-class cricket team which took part in the annual Bombay tournament. The team was founded by members of the Muslim community in Bombay.

The Muslims – known as the Mohamedans at the time – joined the Bombay tournament in 1912, when they accepted an invitation from the Europeans, Hindus and Parsees to expand the competition, which was renamed the Bombay Quadrangular.

The Muslims shared the title after a drawn match with the Hindus in 1913–14, won outright for first time in 1924–25 when they beat the Hindus, and had a strong team during the last decade or so of the tournament's existence, winning the title six times between 1934–35 and 1944–45.

In the 1934–35 final, when the Muslims beat the Hindus, the Test fast bowler Mohammad Nissar took 10 wickets. In the 1940–41 final, when they beat The Rest, the Test leg-spinner Amir Elahi took seven wickets in each innings, for match figures of 57.5–7–192–14. In the 1944–45 final they beat the Hindus by one wicket, K. C. Ibrahim scoring 52 and 137 not out, and Amir Elahi taking match figures of 89–22–223–9.

== Sources ==
- Vasant Raiji, India's Hambledon Men, Tyeby Press, 1986
- Mihir Bose, A History of Indian Cricket, Andre-Deutsch, 1990
- Ramachandra Guha, A Corner of a Foreign Field – An Indian History of a British Sport, Picador, 2001
