= Europeans cricket team =

Indian first-class cricket team founded by members of the European community in Bombay

The Europeans cricket team was an Indian first-class cricket team which took part in the annual Bombay Tournament and Lahore Tournament. The team was founded by members of the European community in Bombay who played cricket at the Bombay Gymkhana.

The Europeans were involved in the Bombay tournament from its outset in 1877, when they accepted a challenge from the Parsis cricket team to a two-day match. At this time, the competition was known as the Presidency Match. They played first-class matches from 1892 to 1948.

There was also a European team composed of European cricketers from Madras Presidency who played in the Madras Presidency Matches.

== Players ==
- See: List of Europeans cricketers (India)

== Sources ==
- Vasant Raiji, India's Hambledon Men, Tyeby Press, 1986
- Mihir Bose, A History of Indian Cricket, Andre Deutsch, 1990
- Ramachandra Guha, A Corner of a Foreign Field - An Indian History of a British Sport, Picador, 2001
