= Ramachandra Guha =

Indian historian and writer (born 1958)

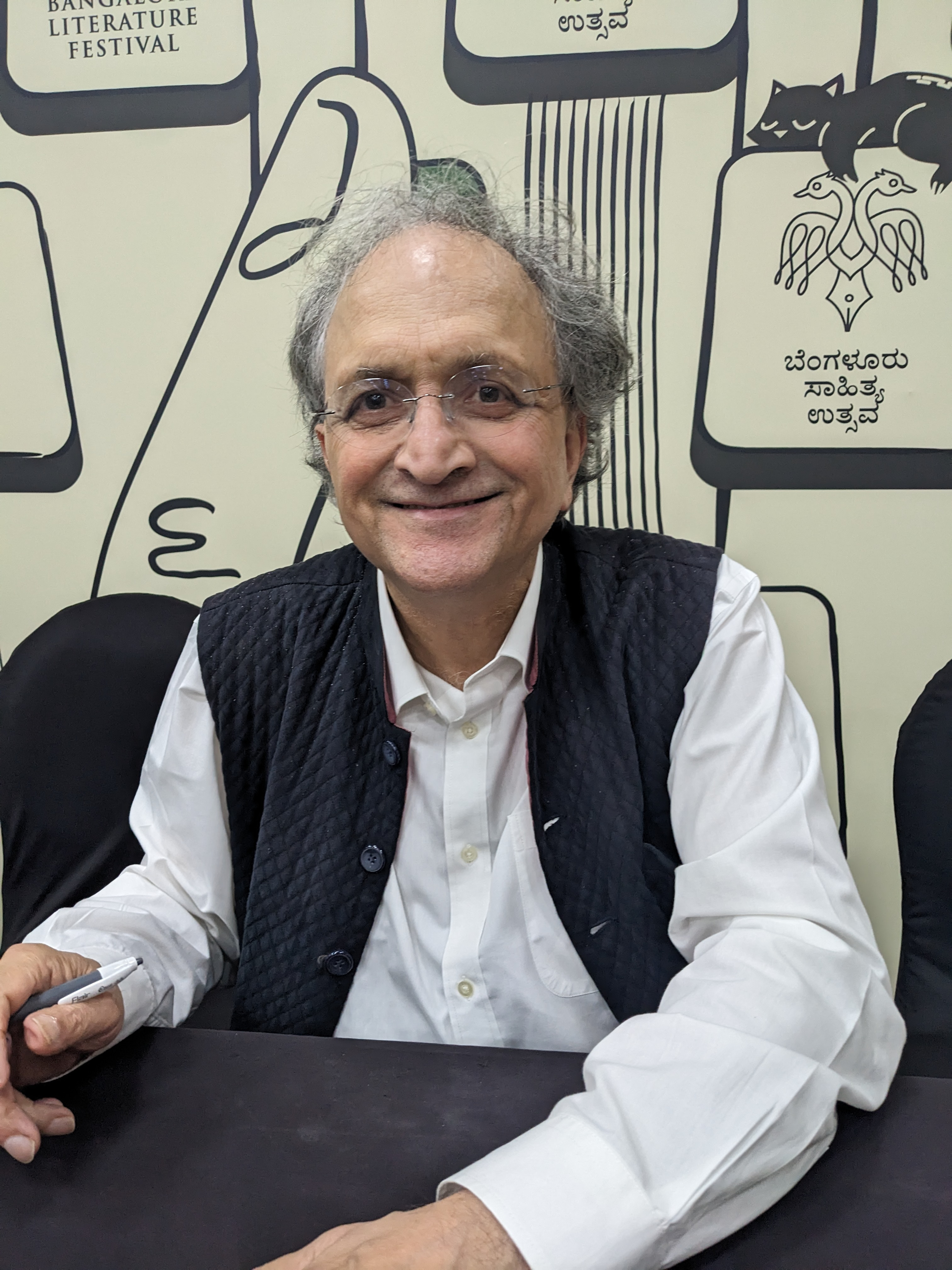
- Guha at the Bangalore Literature Festival, 2024
- Born: 29 April 1958 (age 68); Dehradun, India
- Education: University of Delhi (BA, MA); IIM Calcutta (PhD)
- Occupations: Historian, author, public intellectual, distinguished University professor at Krea University
- Notable work: India After Gandhi; Gandhi Before India; Gandhi: The Years That Changed the World
- Spouse: Sujata Keshavan
- Website: ramachandraguha.in

Signature
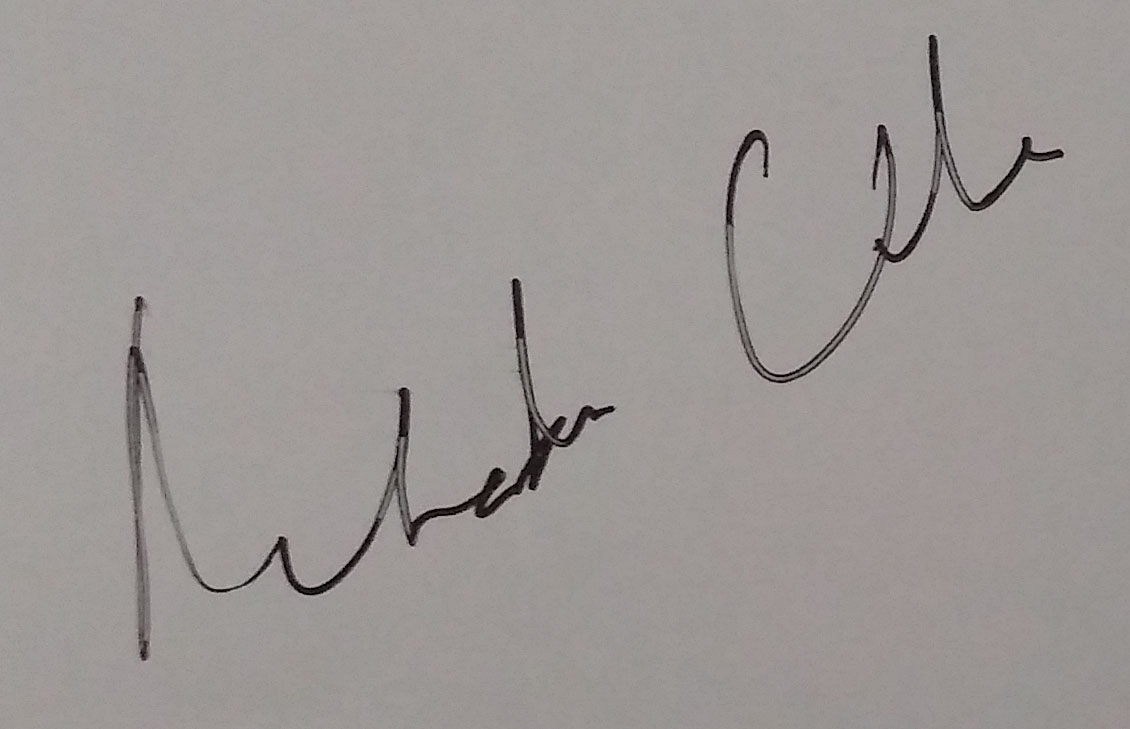

Ramachandra "Ram" Guha (Note: Major news outlets calling the subject Ram Guha—) (born 29 April 1958) is an Indian historian, environmentalist, writer and public intellectual whose research interests include social, political, contemporary, environmental and cricket history. He is an important authority on the history of modern India. The American Historical Association (AHA) has conferred its Honorary Foreign Member prize for the year 2019 on Ramchandra Guha. He is the third Indian historian to be recognised by the association.

Covering a wide range of subjects, Guha has produced three major books of modern India's socio-political history. Among them, Gandhi Before India (2013) and Gandhi: The Years That Changed the World (2018), are the two volumes of biography of Mahatma Gandhi, an icon of the Indian independence movement. The other being India After Gandhi (2007), an account of the history of India from 1947 to 2007, which received commercial and critical success.

He was appointed to BCCI's panel of administrators by the Supreme Court of India in January 2017 but stepped down from his position citing personal reasons five months later. A regular contributor to various academic journals, Guha has also written for The Caravan and Outlook magazines. His book India After Gandhi is read by aspirants of the Indian civil services examination. Guha was listed among the 100 most powerful Indians in 2022 by The Indian Express.

== Early life ==
Guha was born on 29 April 1958 in Dehradun (now in Uttarakhand) into a Tamil Brahmin family. He was raised in Dehradun, where his father Subramaniam Ramdas Guha worked at the Forest Research Institute, and his mother was a high-school teacher. While he should have been named Subramaniam Ramachandra in keeping with Tamil name-keeping norms, his teachers at school, presumably while registering his name during admission, were not familiar with these norms, and he came to be known as Ramachandra Guha. He grew up in Dehradun, on the Forest Research Institute campus.

Guha studied at Cambrian Hall and The Doon School. At Doon, he was a contributor to the school newspaper The Doon School Weekly, and edited a publication called History Times along with Amitav Ghosh, who later became a noted writer. He graduated from St. Stephen's College, Delhi with a bachelor's degree in economics in 1977, and completed his master's in economics from the Delhi School of Economics. He then enrolled at the Indian Institute of Management Calcutta, where he earned a Ph.D. in sociology, focusing on history and prehistory of the Chipko movement. It was later published as The Unquiet Woods: Ecological Change and Peasant Resistance in the Himalaya.

== Career ==
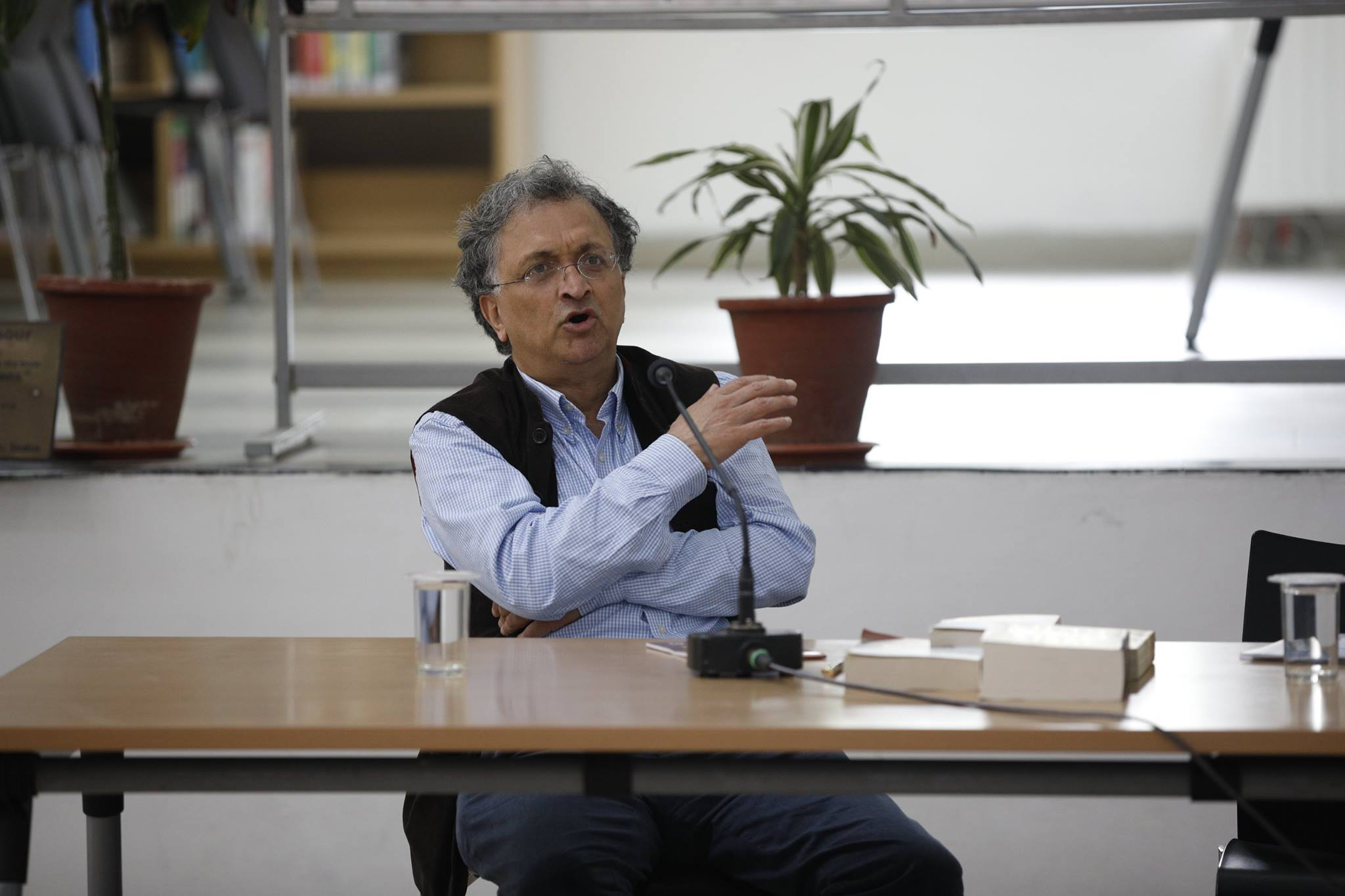
Guha delivering a talk at The Doon School's Kilachand Library in 2017

Guha has authored books on a diverse range of subjects including cricket, the environment, politics, and history. Guha was a visiting professor at the Indian Institute of Science for a year beginning in July 2019. He is the trustee of the New India Foundation fellowship programme, which he himself conceptualised in 2004. He has taught at the following universities: Krea, Stanford, Yale, Berlin Institute for Advanced Study, Indian Institute of Science, and University of California at Berkeley. He held the Arné Naess Chair at the University of Oslo, the Indo-American Community Chair at the University of California at Berkeley, and the Philipe Roman Chair in History and International Affairs at the London School of Economics.

=== History of Modern India ===
Guha is the author of India after Gandhi, published by Macmillan and Ecco in 2007. The book was an instant hit and is considered an essential literature in space of modern Indian history. It was chosen Book of the Year by The Economist, The Wall Street Journal and Outlook Magazine. The book was one of the best non-fiction books of the decade (2010–2019) as per The Hindu. The book won the 2011 Sahitya Akademi Award for English for 'narrative history'.

In 2010, Guha wrote the introduction for and edited Makers of Modern India, which profiles 19 Indians who helped in forming and shaping India. The book contains excerpts of their speeches and essays, and covers topics such as religion, caste, colonialism, and nationalism.

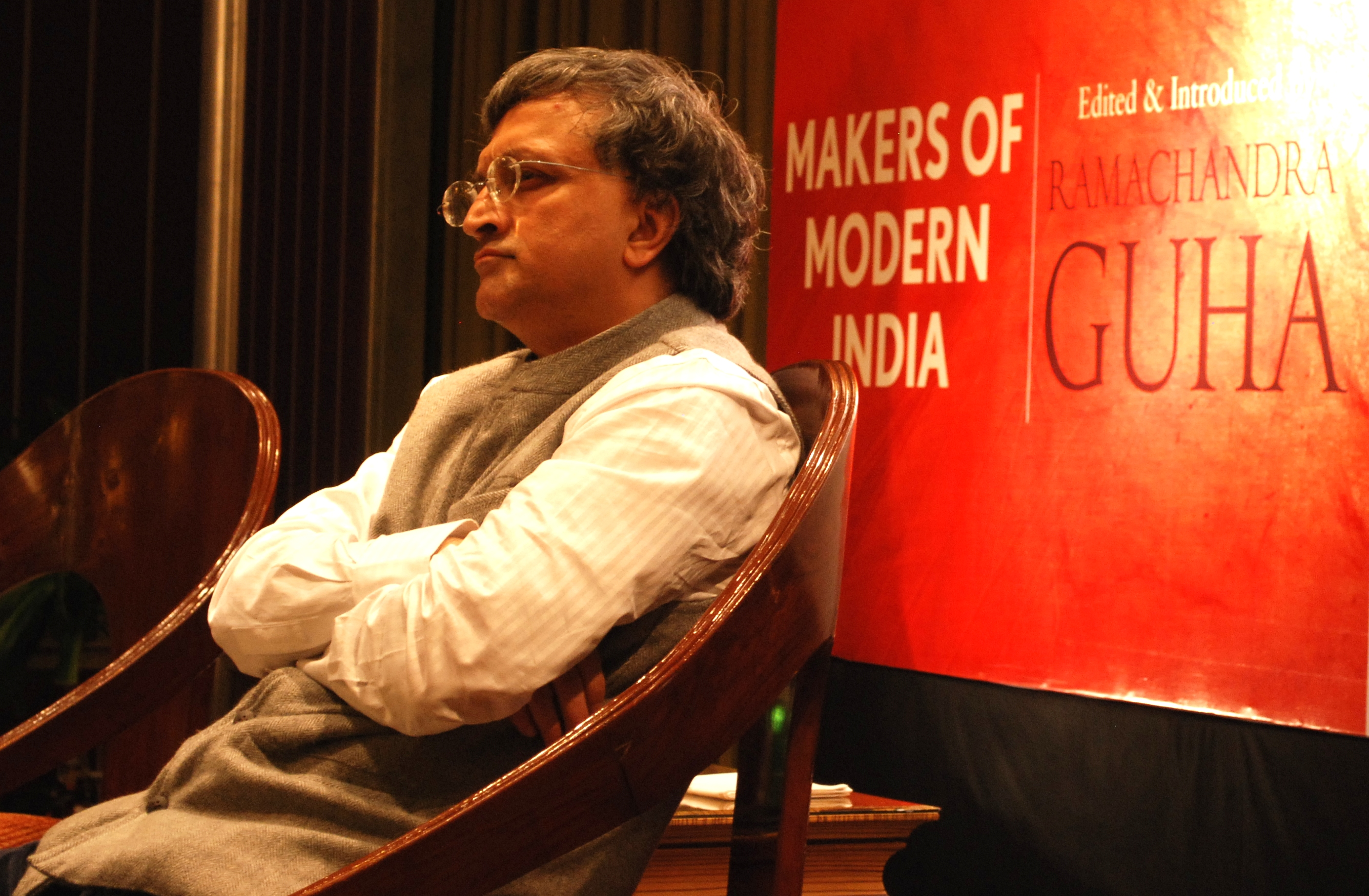
Guha at his book Makers of Modern India's event

In October 2013, he authored Gandhi Before India, the first part of a two-volume biography of Mahatma Gandhi. The biography documents his life from 1869 to 1914, covering events from his childhood to the two decades he spent in South Africa. In 2018, he authored the standalone sequel Gandhi: The Years That Changed the World, 1914-1948, which covers events from when Gandhi returned to India in 1914 to his death in 1948. The book subsumes a lot of new archival material that was discovered only in the 21st century. It has an epilogue which discusses the role of Gandhi in contemporary world politics.

In 2022, Guha authored Rebels Against the Raj, which tells the story of 7 Westerners who came to, lived in, and served India in its quest for independence from the British Raj.

His books are amongst the most sought after by history students and civil service aspirants in India.

Guha has published a collection of essays, two of them being Patriots and Partisans (2012) and Democrats and Dissenters (2016). In 1999, he was offered to write a biography of Atal Bihari Vajpayee which he declined.

=== Environment ===
Guha earned a PhD on the social history of forestry in Uttarakhand, focusing on the Chipko movement. He produced a biography of the anthropologist Verrier Elwin in 1999, and in the same year wrote a book on environmentalism called Environmentalism: A Global History. In 2006, he authored How Much Should a Person Consume?.

=== Cricket ===
Guha has written extensively on cricket as a journalist and as a historian. His research into the social history of Indian cricket culminated in his work A Corner of a Foreign Field: The Indian History of a British Sport, which was released in 2002. The book charts the development of cricket in India from its inception during the British Raj to its position in contemporary India as the nation's favourite pastime.

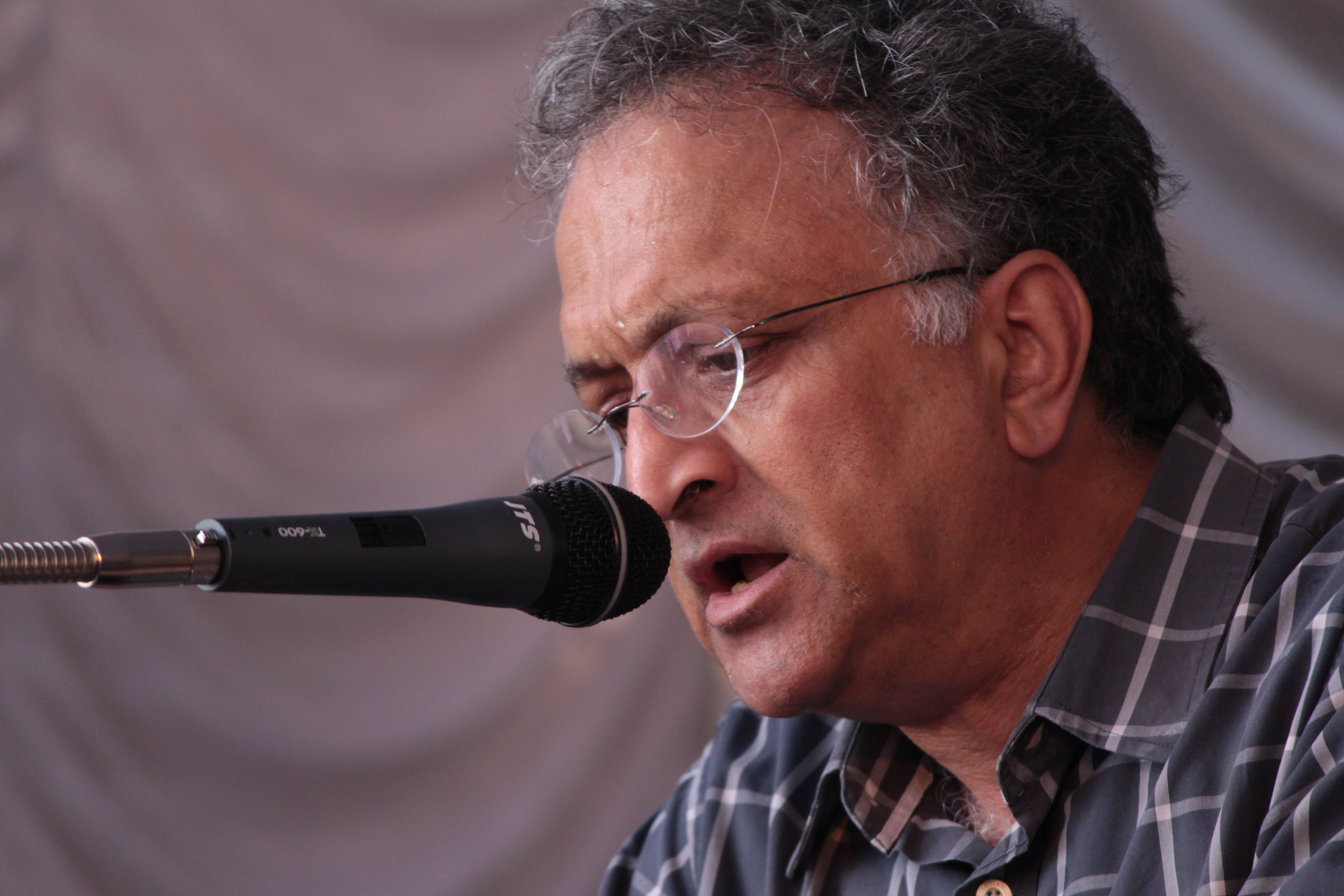
Guha in 2017

He was appointed to BCCI's panel of administrators by the Supreme Court of India on 30 January 2017, as part of the Lodha Committee reforms, only to resign in July of the same year.

In November 2020, he published The Commonwealth of Cricket: A Lifelong Love Affair with the Most Subtle and Sophisticated Game Known to Humankind, a personal account of the transformation of cricket in India across all levels at which the game is played. It presents vivid portraits of local heroes, provincial icons, and international stars through the 50 years he has been following the game. The book blends between memoir, anecdote, reportage, and political critique.

== Personal life ==
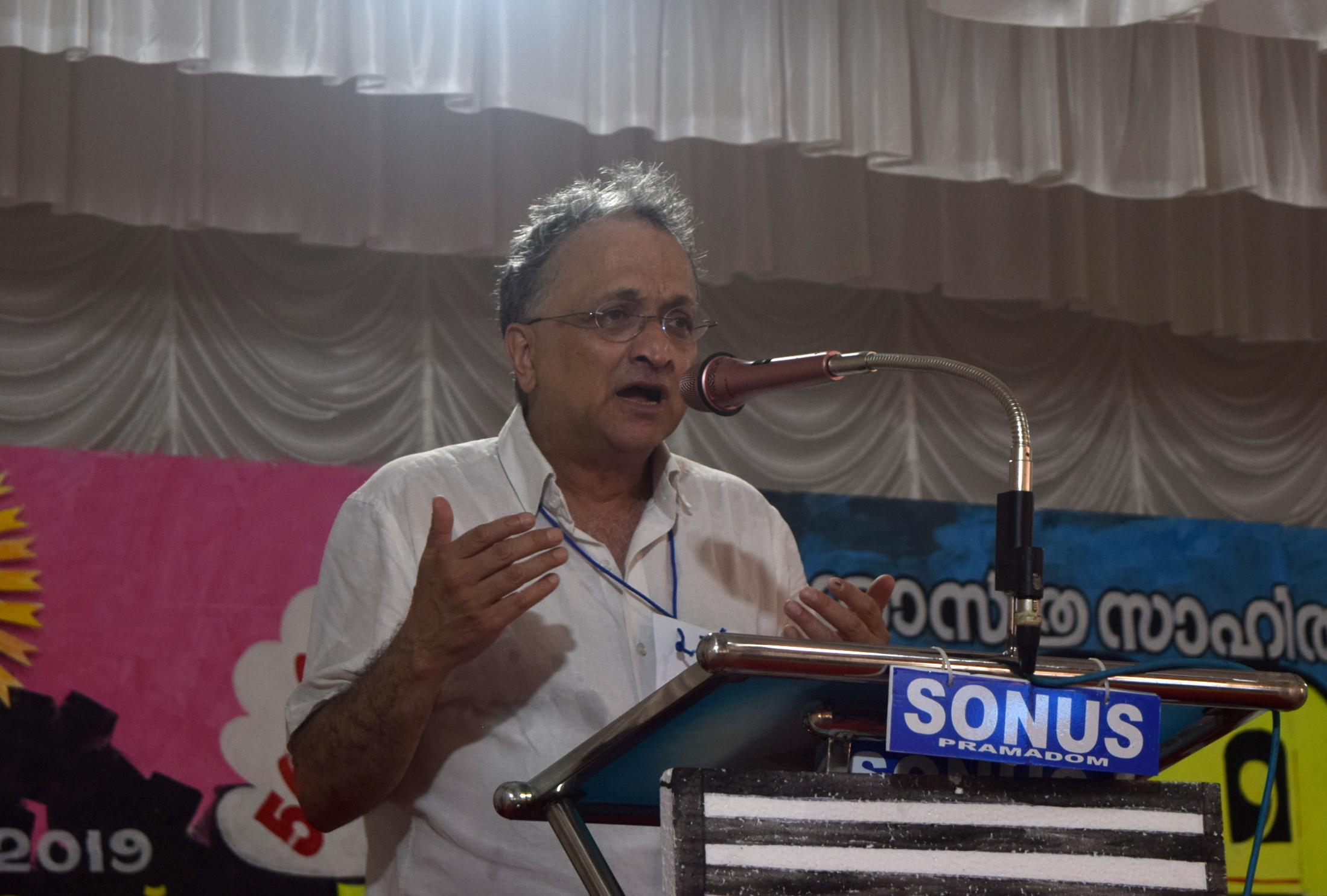
Ramachandra Guha at Kerala Sasthra Sahithya Parishad State Conference 2019, Pramadam, Pathanamthitta, Kerala, India

Guha lives in the city of Bengaluru. He is married to Sujata Keshavan, a graphic designer, and they have two children together. Their son, Keshava Guha, is a novelist, who announced the release of his first novel, Accidental Magic, at the 2019 Bangalore Literature Festival. He competed in the first UK series of the quiz show Jeopardy!

Guha is a nephew of the distinguished organic chemist Krishnaswami Venkataraman, the husband of Guha's paternal aunt Shakuntala and the first Indian director of the National Chemical Laboratory (NCL). Venkataraman's only child, the late economic historian Dharma Kumar, was a first cousin of Guha, and her daughter, the feminist and academic Radha Kumar, is Guha's first cousin once removed. According to Guha, he was close to Venkataraman, who expected his nephew would also become a chemist; although he ultimately decided upon sociology, he credited his uncle as being one of the two people "from whom I learnt that to do something well, one had to do it thoroughly."

Guha doesn't drink alcohol. He lists books, cricket, Hindustani classical music and the iconic eatery of Koshy's in Bangalore as his favorites.

He also writes a column called "Boothavum Varthamanavum"("Past and Present") in the weekly magazine, Mathrubhumi Azhchappathippu.

== Awards and recognition ==
- His essay, "Prehistory of Community Forestry in India", was awarded the Leopold-Hidy Prize of the American Society for Environmental History for 2001.
- A Corner of a Foreign Field was awarded the Daily Telegraph Cricket Society Book of the Year prize for 2002.
- He won the R. K. Narayan Prize at the Chennai Book Fair in 2003.
- The US magazine Foreign Policy named him as one of the top 100 public intellectuals in the world in May 2008. In the poll that followed, Guha was placed 44th.
- Padma Bhushan in 2009, India's third highest civilian award.
- 2011 Sahitya Akademi Award for India after Gandhi.
- In 2014, Guha was awarded an honorary Doctor of Humanities by Yale University
- Fukuoka Asian Culture Prize, 2015
- The American Historical Association (AHA) has conferred its Honorary Foreign Member prize for the year 2019 on Ramchandra Guha.

== Bibliography ==
- Guha, Ramachandra (1989). The Unquiet Woods: Ecological Change and Peasant Resistance in the Himalaya. Berkeley; Oxford University Press (OUP): University of California Press. ISBN 978-0-520-22235-9.
- Guha, Ramachandra (1992). Wickets in the East. India: Oxford University Press. ISBN 978-0-19-562809-8.
- Guha, Ramachandra; Gadgil, Madhav (1993). This Fissured Land: An Ecological History of India. Berkeley; Oxford University Press (OUP): University of California Press. ISBN 978-0-520-08296-0.
- Guha, Ramachandra; Vaidyanathan, T.G. (1994). An Indian Cricket Omnibus. India: Oxford University Press. ISBN 978-0-19-563427-3.
- Guha, Ramachandra; Gadgil, Madhav (1995). Ecology and Equity: The Use and Abuse of Nature in Contemporary India. India: Penguin India. ISBN 978-0-415-12524-6.
- Guha, Ramachandra; Alier, Joan Martinez (1997). Varieties of Environmentalism: Essays North and South. India: Penguin India. ISBN 978-1-85383-329-8.
- Guha, Ramachandra (1998). Social Ecology. India: Oxford University Press. ISBN 978-0-19-564454-8.
- Guha, Ramachandra; Arnold, David (1998). Nature, Culture, Imperialism: Essays on the Environmental History of South Asia. Oxford University Press. ISBN 978-0-19-564075-5.
- Guha, Ramachandra (1999). Savaging the Civilized: Verrier Elwin, his tribals and India. Berkeley; Oxford University Press (OUP): University of California Press. ISBN 978-0-19-564781-5.
- Guha, Ramachandra (2000). Spin and Other Turns. India: Penguin India. ISBN 978-0-14-024720-6.
- Guha, Ramachandra (2000). An Anthropologist Among the Marxists, and other essays. New Delhi, India: Orient Blackswan. ISBN 978-81-7824-001-5.
- Guha, Ramachandra (2001). The Picador Book of Cricket. India: Pan Macmillan. ISBN 978-0-330-39613-4.
- Guha, Ramachandra; Krishnan, M (2001). Nature's Spokesman: M. Krishnan and Indian Wildlife. Picador. ISBN 978-0-19-565911-5.
- Guha, Ramachandra (2004). A Corner of a Foreign Field: An Indian history of a British sport. Picador. ISBN 978-0-330-49117-4.
- Guha, Ramachandra (2004). The Last Liberal and Other Essays. Permanent Black. ISBN 978-81-7824-073-2.
- Guha, Ramachandra (2005). The States of Indian Cricket: Anecdotal Histories. Permanent Black. ISBN 978-81-7824-108-1.
- Guha, Ramachandra (2006). How Much Should a Person Consume?: Thinking Through the Environment. Berkeley; Oxford University Press (OUP): University of California Press. ISBN 978-93-5009-259-0.
- Guha, Ramachandra (2007). India after Gandhi: The history of the world's largest democracy. Picador. ISBN 978-0-330-50554-3.
- Guha, Ramachandra; Parry, Jonathan P (2011). Institutions and Inequalities: Essays in Honour of Andre Beteille. Oxford University Press. ISBN 978-0-19-807552-3.
- Guha, Ramachandra (2012). Makers of Modern India. India: Penguin India. ISBN 978-0-14-341924-2.
- Guha, Ramachandra (2012). Patriots & Partisans. Penguin. ISBN 978-0-670-08386-2.
- Guha, Ramachandra (2013). Gandhi Before India. Penguin. ISBN 978-0-670-08387-9.
- Guha, Ramachandra (2014). Environmentalism: A Global History. United Kingdom: Penguin UK. ISBN 978-0-321-01169-5.
- Guha, Ramachandra (2016). Democrats and Dissenters. India: Penguin India. ISBN 978-0670089369.
- Guha, Ramachandra (2018). Gandhi: The Years that Changed the World, 1914-1948. Knopf. ISBN 978-0-385-53231-0.
- Guha, Ramachandra (2020). The Commonwealth of Cricket: A Lifelong Love Affair with the Most Subtle and Sophisticated Game Known to Humankind. Harper Collins. ISBN 978-93-90327-28-7.
- Guha, Ramachandra (2022). Rebels Against the Raj: Western Fighters for India's Freedom. Harper Collins. ISBN 978-0-008-49876-4.
- Guha, Ramachandra (2024). Speaking with Nature: The Origins of Indian Environmentalism. Fourth Estate India. ISBN 978-9362134905.
- Guha, Ramachandra (2024). The Cooking of Books: A Literary Memoir. Juggernaut. ISBN 978-9353457099.

== Other works ==
- Mukherjee, Sujit (2012). An Indian Cricket Century. India: Orient Blackswan. ISBN 978-8125047971. (Editor)

== See also ==
- List of Indian writers
