= Hindus cricket team =

Former first-class cricket team in India

The Hindus cricket team, run by the Hindu Gymkhana in Bombay, was a first-class team which took part in the annual Bombay Tournament from 1905/06 until its final edition in 1945/46. They won the tournament eleven times. One of their players was Palwankar Baloo, who is generally regarded as India's first great spin bowler.

The Hindus joined the Bombay Tournament in February 1906 when they challenged the Europeans to a match on the Bombay Gymkhana Ground. Batting first, the Hindus scored 242 all out and then dismissed the Europeans for 194 to take first innings lead. The Hindus scored 160 in their second innings. Needing 209 to win, the Europeans were bowled out for 102 in just 33 overs. Baloo took eight wickets in the match with 3/41 and 5/37, but the best bowler was P. A. Erasha who took 6/77 and 4/49.

== See also ==
- Parsis cricket team

== Sources ==
- Raiji, Vasant (1986), India's Hambledon Men, Tyeby Press
- Bose, Mihir (1990), A History of Indian Cricket, Andre Deutsch
- Guha, Ramachandra (2001), A Corner of a Foreign Field – An Indian History of a British Sport, Picador
