= Bombay Tournament (cricket) =

Indian cricket competition (1892–1946)

The Bombay Tournament was an annual cricket competition held in British India between 1892 and 1946. Until 1936, matches were played on either the Gymkhana Ground in Bombay or the Deccan Gymkhana Ground in Poona, and then at the Brabourne Stadium in Bombay until the tournament was terminated in 1946. The tournament was known variously as the Bombay Presidency Match, Bombay Triangular, Bombay Quadrangular, and Bombay Pentangular, depending on the number of competing teams.

== Presidency Match ==
The tournament had its origins in an annual match played between the European members of the Bombay Gymkhana and the Parsis of the Zoroastrian Cricket Club. The first such game was played in 1877, when the Bombay Gymkhana accepted a request for a two-day match from the Parsis. The game was played in good spirit, with the Parsis surprising the Europeans by taking a first innings lead. The Gymkhana recovered, but the match was drawn with the sides evenly poised. The challenge was played again in 1878 and looked set to become an annual event, but racial discontent intervened. From 1879 to 1883, the Parsis and Hindus of Bombay were locked in a struggle against the governing Europeans over the use of the playing fields known as the Bombay Maidan. Gymkhana members would play polo on the field, rendering much of it useless for cricket because of the large divots left by the horses, while sparing their own European-only cricket ground. With this dispute settled in favour of the natives, the Europeans versus Parsis matches resumed in 1884.

The 1889 game was memorable as a thrilling victory to the Parsis, with the Gymkhana being set a target of 53 to win: Parsi captain M.E. Pavri bowled well to help dismiss the Europeans for 50, giving the Parsis a two-run victory. Matches from 1892–93 are given first-class status: the match that began at Bombay Gymkhana on 26 August 1892 is considered the earliest first-class match in India.

By 1900, the Presidency Match – as the Europeans versus Parsis game had come to be called – was the highlight of the Bombay cricket season. In the 19 matches to this year, the teams had won eight each and drawn three.

== Bombay Triangular ==
While the Europeans and Parsis were regularly playing against each other, the Hindu Gymkhana had been amassing its own quality players. In 1906, the Hindus challenged the Parsis to a match, but the communal differences between the clubs led the Parsis to decline. The Bombay Gymkhana stepped in and accepted the challenge, leading to the first Europeans versus Hindus match, played that February. The Hindu side ended up recording a stunning 110-run victory over the Europeans. The Hindus boasted Palwankar Baloo, who is regarded as India's first great spin bowler, and perhaps the first person from the Chamar caste to make an impact in an Indian sporting arena. He was not allowed the captaincy of the team because of his caste, but his younger brother Palwankar Vithal, a batsman, would go on to captain the Hindus in 1923, following a campaign to accord recognition to the Palwankar brothers in the wake of the anti-casteism advocated during the Indian Independence Movement.

The next year, 1907, saw the first Triangular tournament featuring teams from the Bombay and Hindu Gymkhanas as well as the Zoroastrian Cricket Club. From 1907 to 1911 the tournament was played in September, with the Parsis winning three times and the Europeans twice.

== Bombay Quadrangular ==
In 1912, the Muslims of the Mohammedan Gymkhana were invited to the now famous Bombay tournament, making it a Quadrangular. The tournament was held throughout World War I, but poor weather at the end of the monsoon season rained out four of the six finals played up until 1916. In 1917, the Quadrangular was moved to November/December to avoid such problems. Another change for the 1917 tournament was the use of neutral umpires for the first time. Up to this season, a European umpire appointed by the Bombay Gymkhana had always officiated, but from now on the umpires for any match would be supplied by the non-competing teams. This was one of the first uses of neutral umpires in world cricket.

The Quadrangular became more popular than its predecessor, and for many years formed the highlight of the Bombay year. This was against the backdrop of Mohandas K. Gandhi's campaigns for the Indian home rule. Gandhi and his followers were critical of the Quadrangular, seeing the tournament as having the effect of quelling opposition to British colonial rule by ensuring continued support toward Britain's presence and cultural influence on the Indian subcontinent. Gandhi, who had himself played cricket as a schoolboy, was not against having a cricket tournament, but was opposed to having teams formed on the basis of their religion. In 1940 he is known to have asked the "sporting public of Bombay to revise their sporting code and to erase from it communal matches."

The 1921 tournament attracted particular attention, as the Prince of Wales visited Bombay during it. His arrival sparked three days of political rioting in Bombay, but did not disrupt the tournament. After the riots had ended, he attended the first day of the final, accepting cheers from a pro-European crowd, who eventually witnessed the Parsis prevail over the Bombay Gymkhana.

By the 1920s, the Gymkhanas were recruiting players from all over the Indian subcontinent, making the Bombay Quadrangular the biggest and most influential cricket tournament in India. It also inspired other local competitions, including a Triangular in Lahore and Quadrangulars in Nagpur and Karachi, that led to the rapid development of cricket throughout the region. Although the Quadrangular partly quelled discrimination on racial or caste lines, the question of religion came up in 1924. The Hindu Gymkhana initially extended an invitation to P. A. Kanickam of Bangalore to play for them. Later they discovered that the player was not a Hindu, but a Christian, and withdrew their invitation. With the Europeans not accepting Indians, and the Hindus not accepting Christians, Kanickam had no way of playing in the tournament.

In 1930, Gandhi's campaign reached a climax with the Salt Satyagraha, provoking civil disobedience and the arrests of 60,000 Indians. Amidst this political turmoil, the Quadrangular tournament was cancelled. It was not held again until 1934, when the cricket-starved public enthusiastically supported its reinstatement. In 1935, the sports editor of the nationalist Bombay Chronicle, J. C. Maitra, suggested the Quadrangular be replaced with a geographic-zone-based tournament, to remove the racial and religious overtones. A newspaper correspondent argued an opposite case, for expansion into a Pentangular, with a team for Indian Christians. The public however clamoured for the traditional format and these suggestions were ignored.

== Bombay Pentangular ==
Finally, in 1937, a fifth team, called The Rest, was admitted to the tournament. It comprised Buddhists, Jews, and Indian Christians. On the odd occasion, players from Ceylon appeared for them including at least one Hindu. The first Pentangular, however, was played between just four teams, as the Hindus withdrew in protest over not being allocated what they considered a fair share of seats in the new Brabourne Stadium.

From 1938, the Pentangular attracted growing criticism as being divisive because of the communalism implicit in the makeup of the teams. This was exacerbated by the growing political movement for Indian independence, which wished to foster unity amongst Indians as opposed to competition. Eventually, amidst a backdrop of rioting and political unrest across India, the newly formed Board of Control for Cricket in India announced in 1946 that the Pentangular tournament was being abandoned, and being replaced by a zonal competition. The Ranji Trophy, in which regional teams from all over India compete, became the pre-eminent Indian cricket competition.

== Tournament winners ==
=== Bombay Presidency winners ===
- 1892-93 – Parsees
- 1893-94 – Europeans
- 1894-95 – Europeans shared with Parsees
- 1895-96 – Europeans shared with Parsees
- 1896-97 – Europeans
- 1897-98 – Parsees
- 1898-99 – Europeans
- 1899-1900 – Europeans shared with Parsees
- 1900-01 – Parsees
- 1901-02 – Europeans shared with Parsees
- 1902-03 – Europeans shared with Parsees
- 1903-04 – Parsees
- 1904-05 – Parsees
- 1905-06 – Hindus shared with Parsees
- 1906-07 – Hindus

=== Bombay Triangular winners ===
- 1907-08 – Hindus
- 1908-09 – Hindus
- 1909-10 – Hindus
- 1910-11 – Hindus
- 1911-12 – Hindus

=== Bombay Quadrangular winners ===
- 1912-13 – Parsees
- 1913-14 – Hindus shared with Muslims
- 1914-15 – Hindus shared with Parsees
- 1915-16 – Europeans
- 1916-17 – Europeans shared with Parsees
- 1917-18 – Hindus shared with Parsees
- 1918-19 – Europeans
- 1919-20 – Hindus
- 1920-21 – Hindus and Parsees shared
- 1921-22 – Europeans
- 1922-23 – Parsees
- 1923-24 – Hindus
- 1924-25 – Muslims
- 1925-26 – Hindus
- 1926-27 – Hindus
- 1927-28 – Europeans
- 1928-29 – Parsees
- 1929-30 – Hindus
- 1930-31 – not contested
- 1931-32 – not contested
- 1932-33 – not contested
- 1933-34 – not contested
- 1934-35 – Muslims
- 1935-36 – Muslims
- 1936-37 – Hindus

=== Bombay Pentangular winners ===
- 1937-38 – Muslims
- 1938-39 – Muslims
- 1939-40 – Hindus
- 1940-41 – Muslims
- 1941-42 – Hindus
- 1942-43 – not contested
- 1943-44 – Hindus
- 1944-45 – Muslims
- 1945-46 – Hindus
