= List of Old Alleynians =

The following is a list of notable Old Alleynians, former pupils of Dulwich College, in south London, England.

Years of birth and death (when listed) are given in full. Years at the college are given last, using two digits if unambiguous. All entries are placed in alphabetical order by surname, paying particular attention to any double-barrelled surnames, in which the letters of the first surname take priority.

== Arts and entertainment ==
=== Art and photography ===
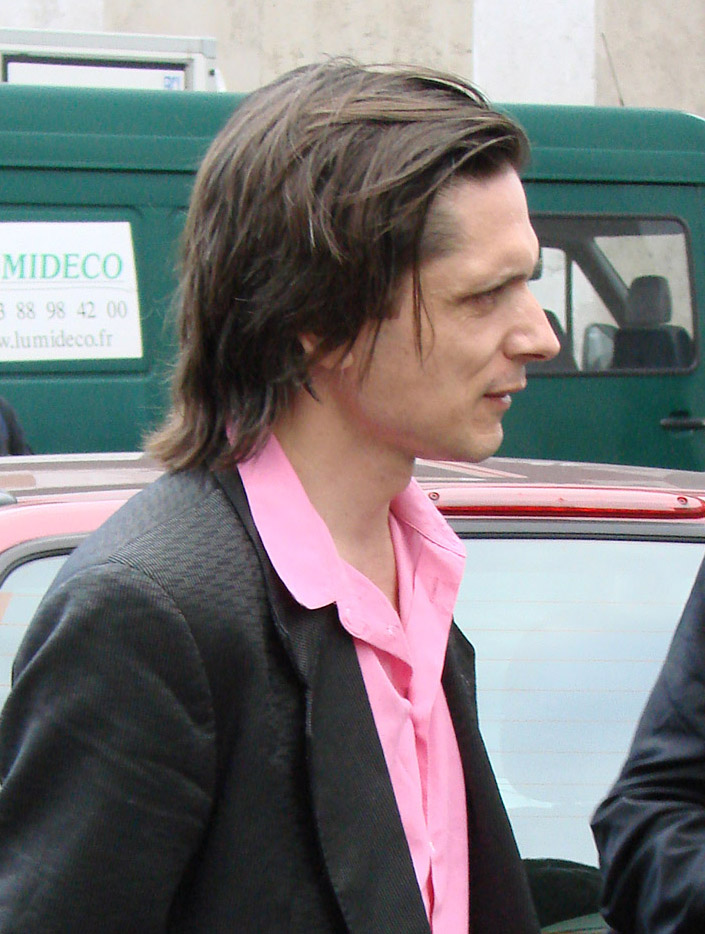
Jeremy Deller

- Jeremy Deller, artist
- Gabriele Finaldi (born 1965), art historian and curator, director of the National Gallery
- Stephen Finer, artist
- Stanhope Forbes (1857–1947), artist and member of the once influential Newlyn school of painters
- Stephen Gardiner, OBE (1924–2007), British architect, teacher and writer
- Walter Hodges (1909–2004), English illustrator and author
- James Jarvis, graphic artist
- Anthony F. Kersting (1916–2008), photographer
- Henry Herbert La Thangue RA (1857–1929), artist
- Gavin Stamp (1948 – 2017), writer and architectural historian
- C. F. A. Voysey (1857–1941), English architect and furniture designer (FRIBA, RDI)

=== Drama ===
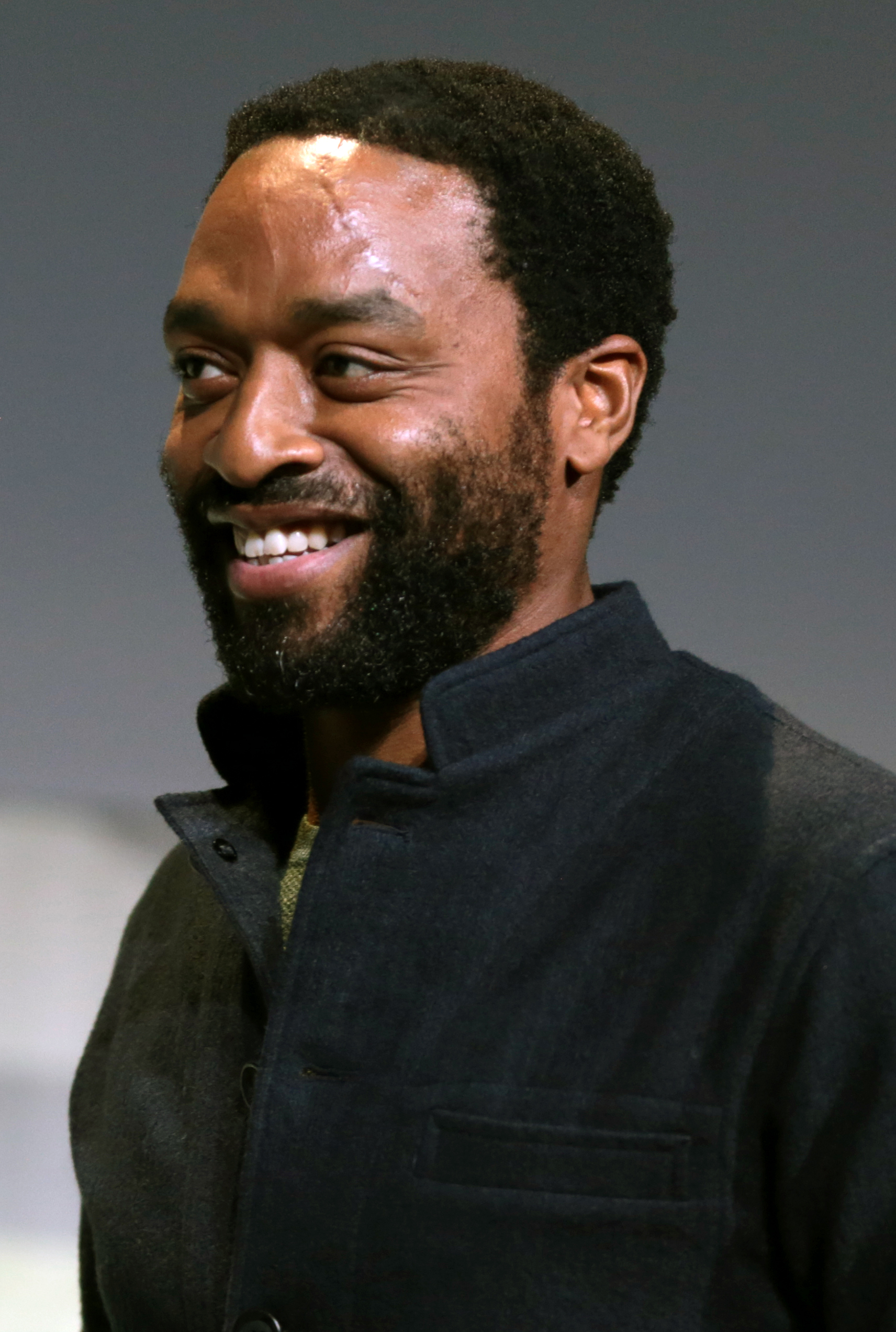
Chiwetel Ejiofor

- Clive Brook (1887–1974), actor
- Richard Caldicot (1908–1995), actor
- Chiwetel Ejiofor (born 1976), film actor: 1990–1995
- Nicholas Galitzine (born 1994), actor
- Nigel Harman (born 1973), actor
- Jeremy Howe, BBC Radio 4 Drama Commissioning Editor, editor of The Archers
- Angus Imrie (born 1994), television, radio and stage actor: 2001–2012 (and son of the actress Celia Imrie)
- Raza Jaffrey (born 1975), actor
- Jamie Thomas King (born 1981), actor
- John Francis Lane (1928–2018), actor
- Rupert Penry-Jones (born 1970), actor: 1982–1989
- Michael Powell (1905–1990), film director
- Mel Raido (born 1977), actor: 1989–1994
- Ben Turner (born 1980), actor
- Derek Waring (1927–2007), actor
- Arthur Wimperis (1874–1953), script and screenplay writer; won Academy Award (Oscar) in 1942 for Best Screenplay for the film Mrs. Miniver
- Ekow Quartey (2001-2008), actor

=== Entertainment & media ===
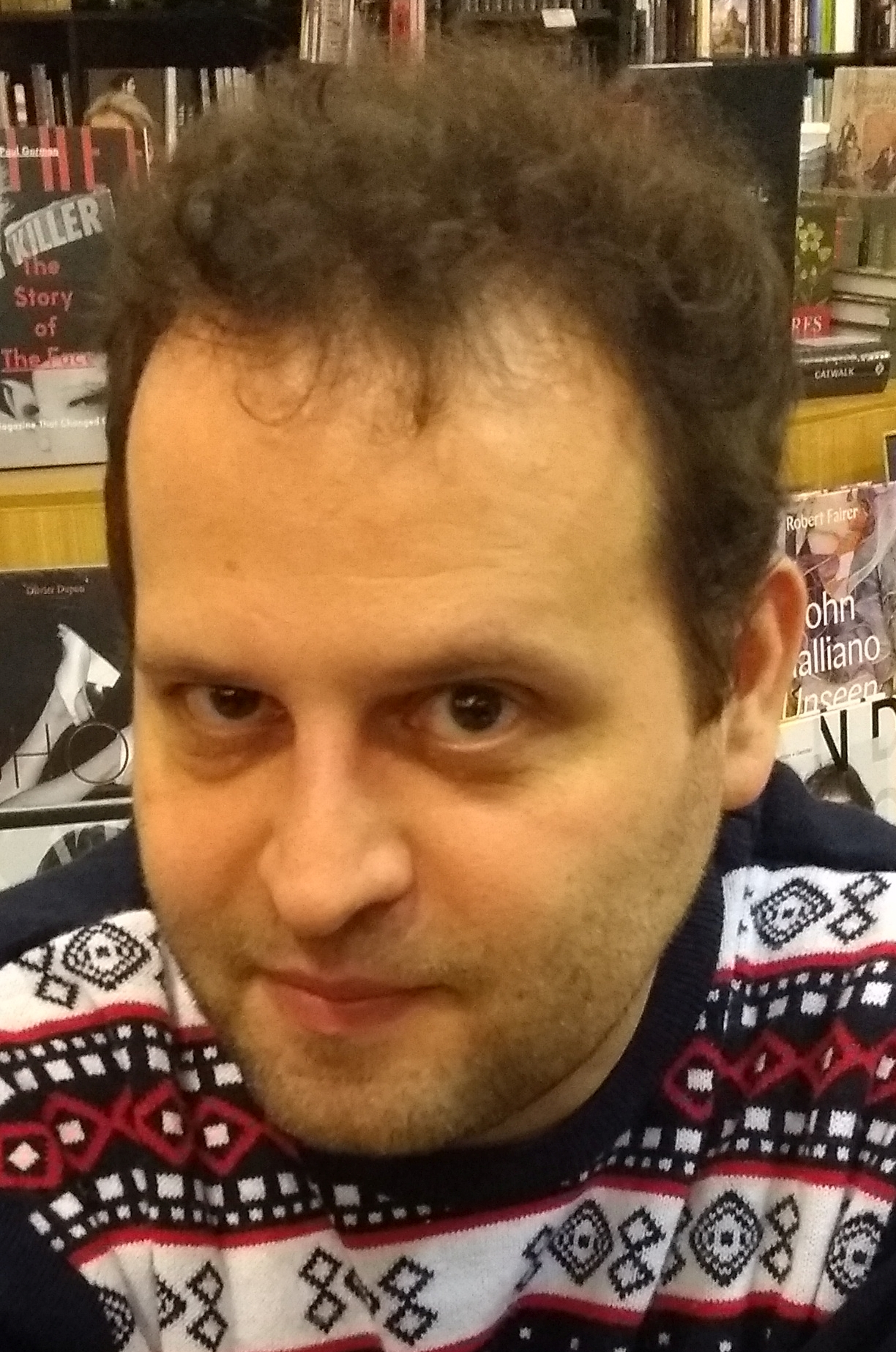
Adam Kay

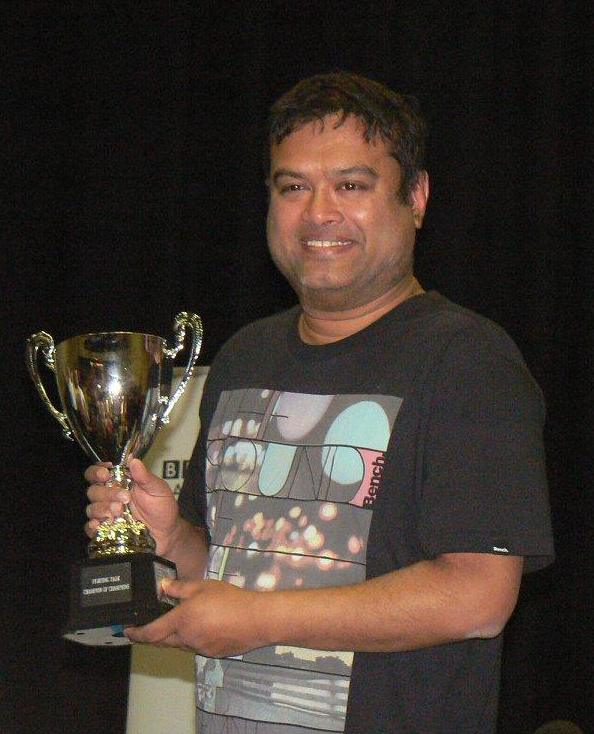
Paul Sinha

- Rowan Ayers (1922–2008), television producer
- Lionel Barber, Financial Times editor
- Godfrey Barker, journalist and author
- Peter Bazalgette, television producer: 64–71
- Rob Bonnet, TV sports journalist: 64–71
- Clive Bull (born 1959), broadcaster, narrator: 1970–1977
- Gordon Burns (born 1942), British journalist and television presenter; host of Granada TV's popular game show The Krypton Factor
- Nat Coombs, television presenter, comedian and comedy writer
- Peter Dimmock, sports broadcaster
- Peter Ettedgui, film maker
- Denis Gifford (1927–2000), film historian, comics historian, cartoonist: 1939–41
- Jonathan Head, BBC South Asia correspondent: 74–78
- David Heycock, television producer
- Adam Kay (born 1980), writer and comedian
- Bob Monkhouse (1928–2003), comedian: 42–45 (expelled)
- Adam Shaheen, president, executive producer, Cuppa Coffee Studios
- Paul Sinha, comedian
- David Thomson, film critic
- Peter Warren (born 1939), Canadian investigative journalist, private investigator, former talk radio host and member of the Canadian Association of Broadcasters' Hall of Fame
- Martin Young, TV reporter and media trainer

=== Literature ===
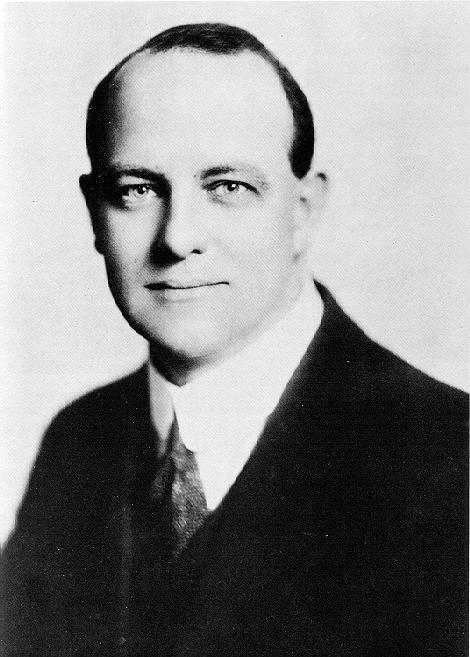
Sir P. G. Wodehouse

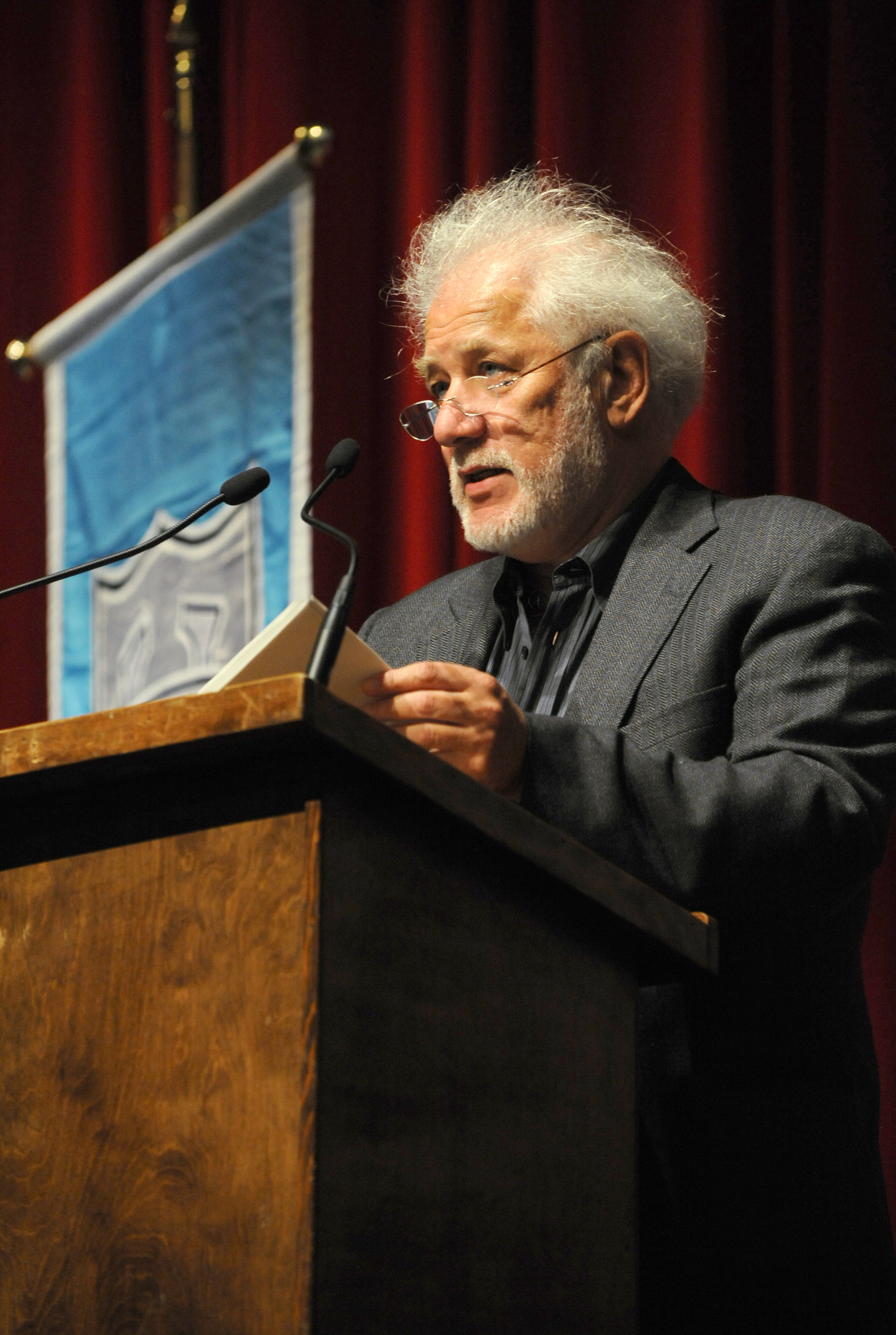
Michael Ondaatje

- George Bedborough (1868–1940), English bookseller, journalist and writer
- Simon Brett (born 1945), writer
- Raymond Chandler (1888–1959), writer: 1900–1905
- Hugh de Selincourt (1878–1951), English author and journalist, chiefly remembered today for his tale of village cricket, The Cricket Match (1924)
- C. S. Forester (1899–1966), writer: 15–16
- Denis Goodwin, script writer: 41(?)-44(?)
- Hamish Henderson (1919–2002), Scottish poet, songwriter, socialist, humanist, soldier, and intellectual
- Nigel Hinton (born 1941), writer
- Claude Houghton (1889–1961), writer
- G. Wilson Knight (1897–1985), English literary critic and academic
- Andrew George Lehmann, English art and literary critic
- Ian MacCormick (aka Ian MacDonald) (1948–2003), author (Revolution in the Head, The New Shostakovich)
- A. E. W. Mason (1865–1948), writer
- Tom McCarthy (born 1969), writer short-listed for the Booker Prize
- Michael Ondaatje (born 1943), writer winner, of Booker Prize
- Jon Silkin (1930–1997), poet
- Thomas Sturge Moore (1870–1944), poet and artist
- Graham Swift (born 1949), writer
- Alexander Turnbull (1868-1918), bibliophile
- Dennis Wheatley, occultist writer
- P. G. Wodehouse (1881–1975), writer: 1894–1900

=== Music ===
- John Amis, broadcaster and critic (at Dulwich 1936–1939)
- Peter Branscombe (1929–2008), musicologist
- Harold Fraser-Simson (1872–1944), British composer, famous for The Maid of the Mountains
- Alan Ray Hacker, OBE (born 1938)
- Gordon Jacob (1895–1984), composer
- Rupert Jarvis, bassist for The Maccabees (expelled after one term, 1999)
- Bill MacCormick, musician (Quiet Sun, Random Hold, 801)
- Phil Manzanera (P. G. Targett-Adams) (born 1951), musician with Roxy Music (at Dulwich 1960–1969)
- Ray Noble, bandleader and composer
- Anthony Payne (1936–2021), composer, elaborated the sketches of Elgar's Third Symphony
- David Rhodes, musician, member of 1970s band Random Hold, long-serving collaborator with Peter Gabriel
- Max Sedgley, music producer, drummer, DJ
- Ed Simons, one half of the Chemical Brothers (at Dulwich 1986–1991)
- Neil Thomson, conductor at Philharmonic Orchestra of Goiás

== Exploration ==
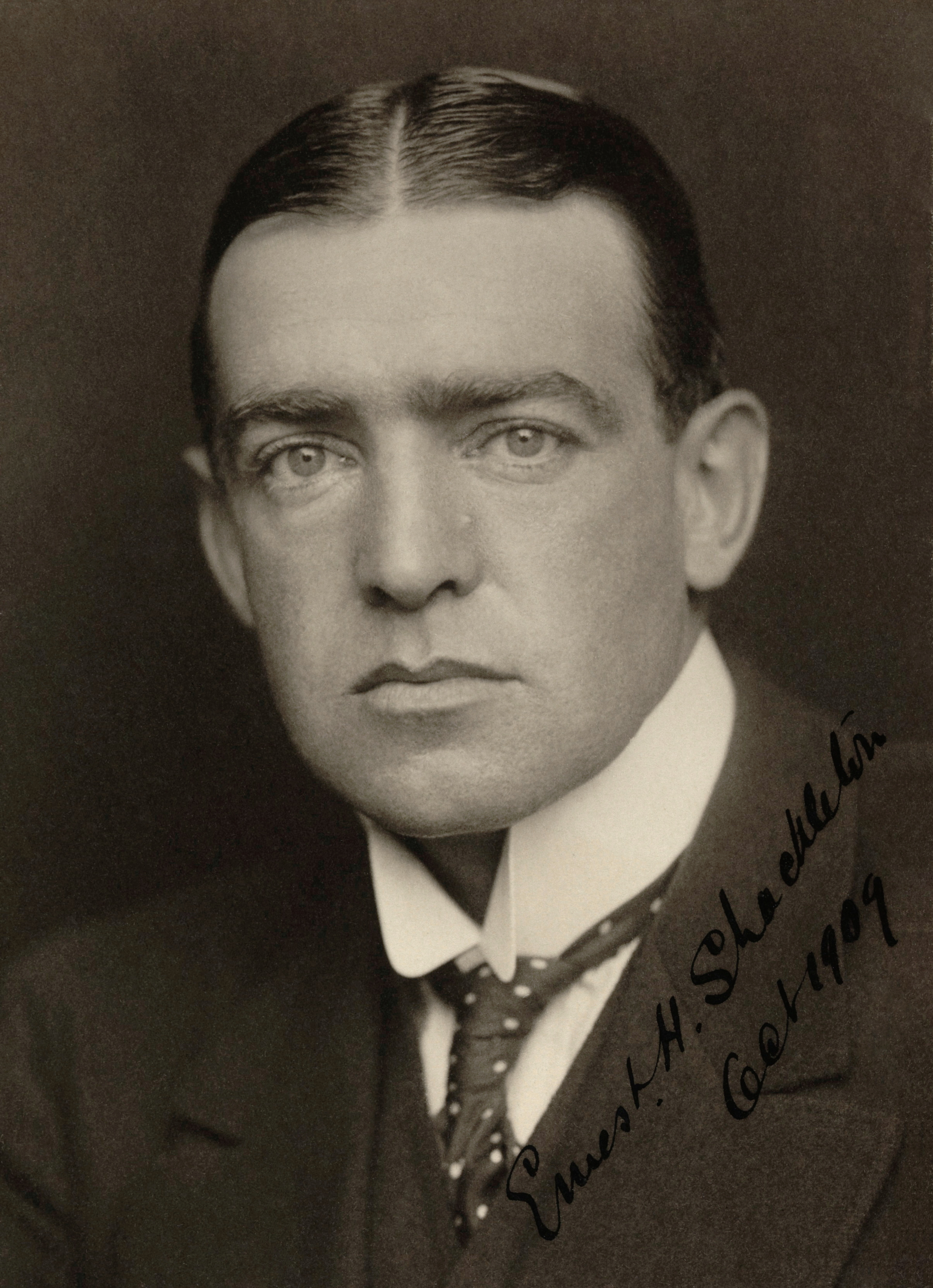
Ernest Shackleton

- Stanley Portal Hyatt (1877–1914) 1885–92 #3817 African explorer and war correspondent
- Sir Ernest Henry Shackleton CVO, OBE (1874–1922) 1887–90 was a British Antarctic explorer who led three British expeditions to the Antarctic. He was one of the principal figures of the period known as the Heroic Age of Antarctic Exploration. During the Nimrod expedition of 1907–1909, he and three companions established a new record Farthest South latitude at 88°S, only 97 geographical miles (112 statute miles or 180 kilometres) from the South Pole, the largest advance to the pole in exploration history. Also, members of his team climbed Mount Erebus, the most active Antarctic volcano. For these achievements, Shackleton was knighted by King Edward VII on his return home.

== Military ==
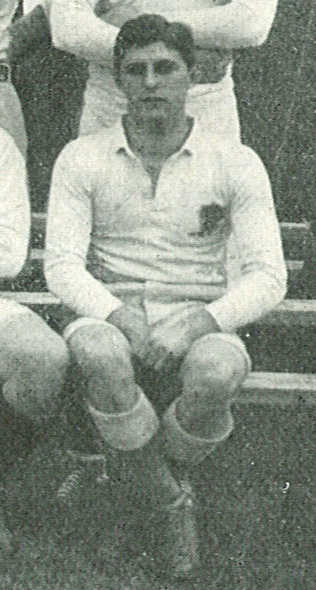
Cyril Lowe

- Rear Admiral Martin Alabaster, Flag Officer, Scotland, Northern England and Northern Ireland
- Wing Commander Frank Arthur Brock (1884–1918), OBE inventor of the smoke-screen at Zeebrugge in 1918
- Wing Commander Hugh Eliot, a flying ace with the Royal Air Force during the Second World War
- General Sir Webb Gillman KCB KCMG DSO, former chief of staff in Mesopotamia
- Lieutenant General Eric Goddard, Indian Army, GOC-in-C Southern Command India
- Air Vice-Marshal F. C. Halahan CMG CBE DSO MVO
- Berthold Wells Key (1895–1986), CB DSO MC ADC, Major General during Second World War
- Group Captain Cyril Nelson "Kit" Lowe (1891–1983), MC DFC RAF, English rugby union footballer, First World War flying ace, and supposedly the inspiration for W. E. Johns' character "Biggles".
- Brigadier Geoffrey Rimbault CBE DSO MC DL (1908–1991), British Army officer
- Rear Admiral Arthur Skey (1873–1942), recipient of the Order of Saints Maurice and Lazarus in the First World War
- Wing Commander G. H. Stainforth (1899–1942), AFC RAF, British Royal Air Force pilot and the first man in the world to exceed 400 mph in an aircraft
- Air Commodore Owen Truelove, first man to fly from England to New Zealand in a glider
- Brigadier James Whitehead (1880–1955), CB, CMG, CBE, DSO, OStJ, ADC, British Indian Army officer who later became a senior officer in the London Metropolitan Police
- Air Chief Marshal Sir John Willis GBE KCB FRAeS, Vice Chief of the Defence Staff

=== Victoria Cross and George Cross holders ===
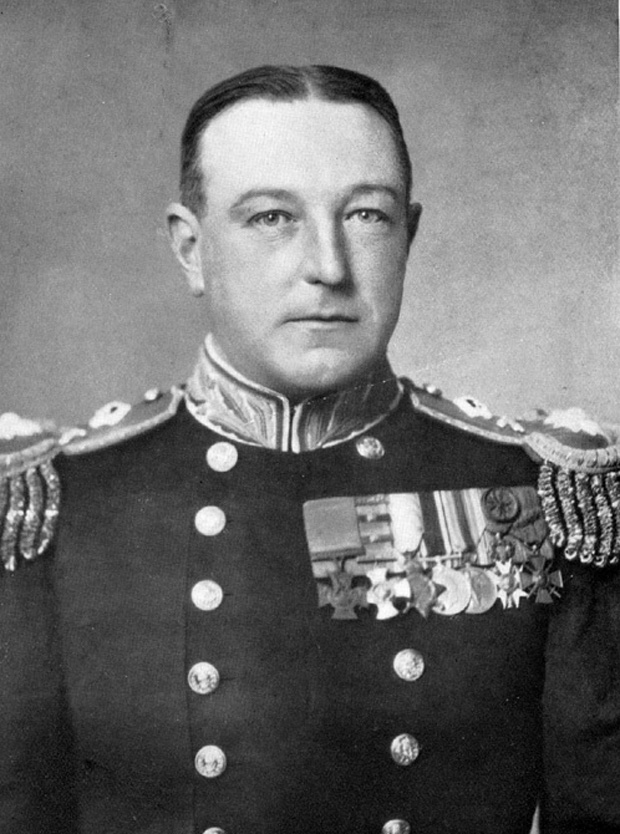
Vice Admiral Gordon Campbell

Seven Old Alleynians have won the Victoria Cross, five in the First World War, 1914–18 (of whom four were killed in action) and two in the Second World War, 1939–45. In the Second World War one OA won the George Cross.

- Victoria Cross
  - First World War
    - Vice-Admiral Gordon Campbell (1886–1953), VC, DSO
    - Lieutenant Richard Basil Brandram Jones (1897–1916), VC
    - Major Alexander Malins Lafone (1870–1917), VC
    - Major Stewart Walter Loudoun-Shand (1879–1916), VC
    - Lieutenant Cecil Harold Sewell (1895–1918), VC
  - Second World War
    - Lieutenant-Colonel Lorne McLaine Campbell (1902–1991), VC, DSO, TD, MA (later achieved the rank of brigadier and was awarded the OBE)
    - Captain Philip John Gardner (1914–2003), VC, MC
- George Cross
  - Second World War
    - Major Herbert John Leslie Barefoot (1887–1958), GC, ARIBA

== Philosophy and academia ==
- C. D. Broad (1887–1971), epistemologist, historian of philosophy, and philosopher
- Gareth Evans (1946–1980), philosopher
- Robert Gildea, author and Professor of History at the University of Oxford
- Hugh Gusterson, author and Professor of Anthropology and International Affairs at the George Washington University; president of American Ethnological Society, 2015–17
- William Keith Chambers Guthrie (1906–1981), Scottish classical scholar, best known for his History of Greek Philosophy, in six volumes
- Sir Charles Hilary Jenkinson (1882–1961), archivist; founder and definer of modern archival theory and practice
- John Lewis (1889–1976), philosopher
- K. B. McFarlane (1903–1966), historian
- George Edward Moore (1873–1958), one of the founders of the Analytic tradition in philosophy
- Arthur Lindsay Sadler (1882–1970), was Professor of Oriental Studies at the University of Sydney
- Dominic Shellard, disgraced vice chancellor of De Montfort University (at the school 1977–1984)
- Sir John Sheppard (1881–1968), classical scholar, the first non-Etonian to become provost of King's College, Cambridge, and openly gay
- Alic Halford Smith, former vice-chancellor of Oxford University
- John Steane (born 1931), former headmaster, archaeologist, and author
- John Wells (1947–99), economist.
- Michael Winterbottom, classics scholar, Oxford University

== Politics, law and business ==
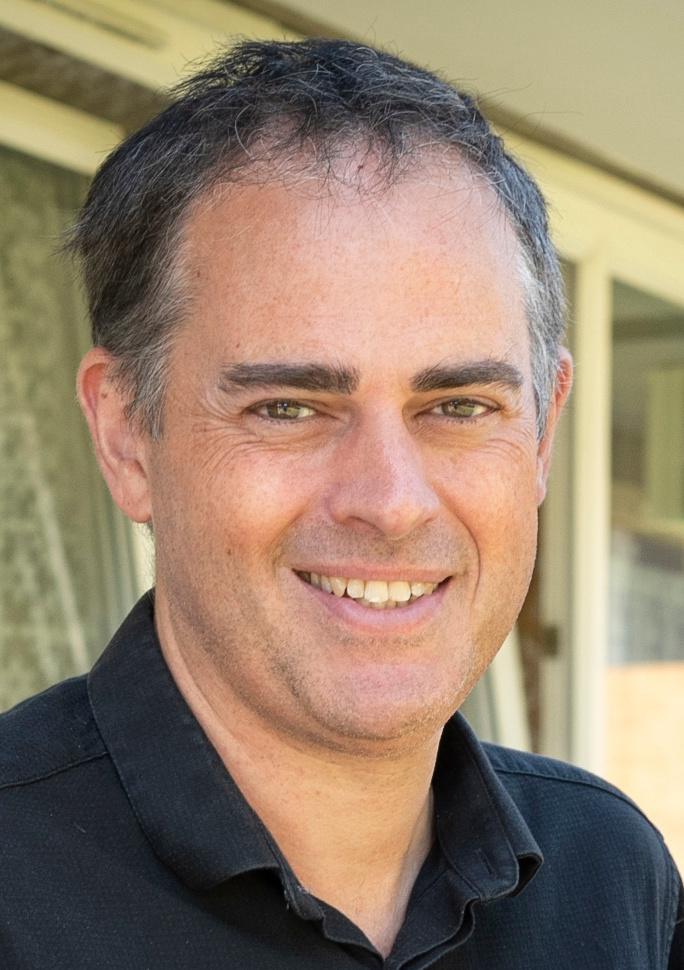
Co-Leader Green Party Jonathan Bartley

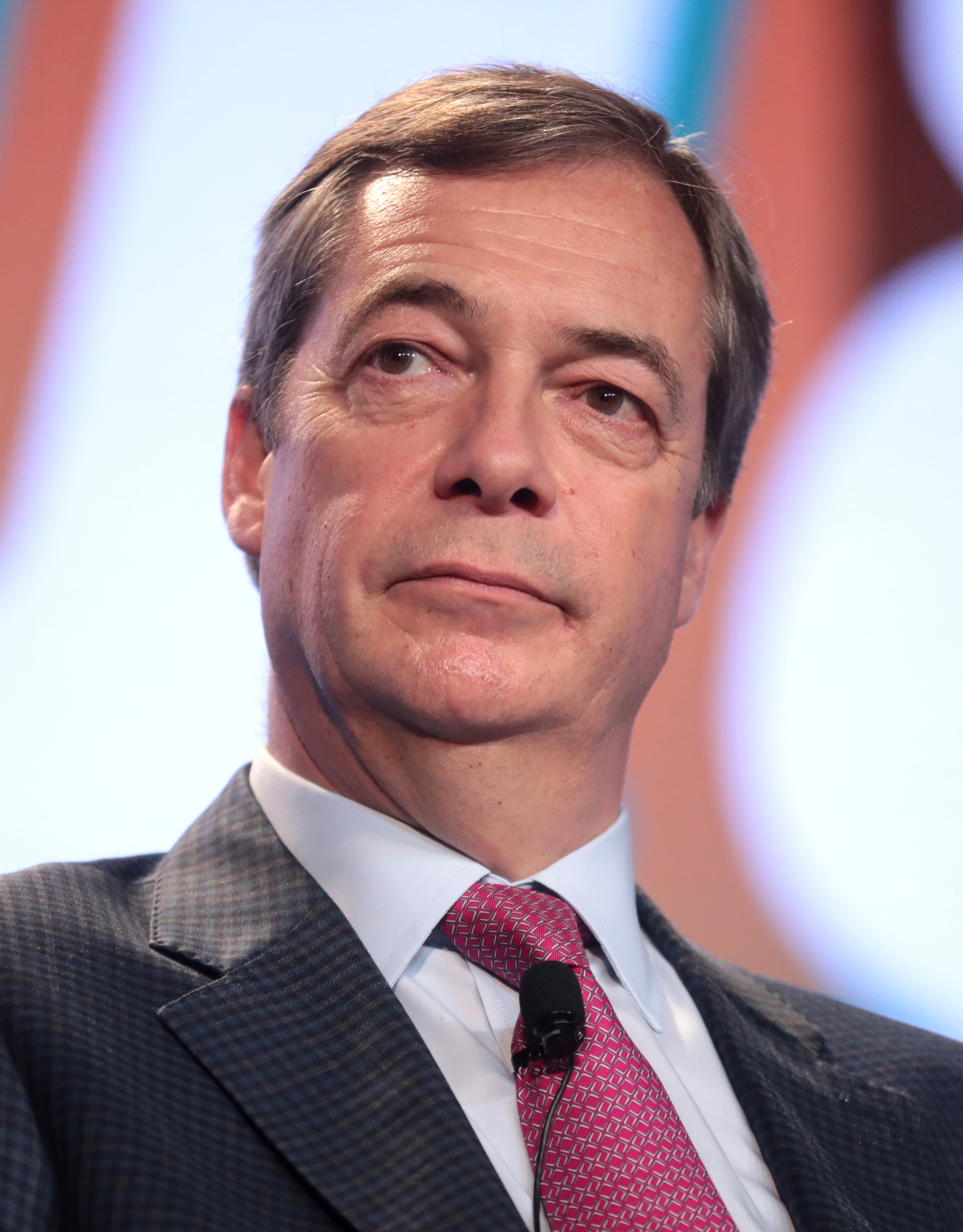
Reform UK leader Nigel Farage

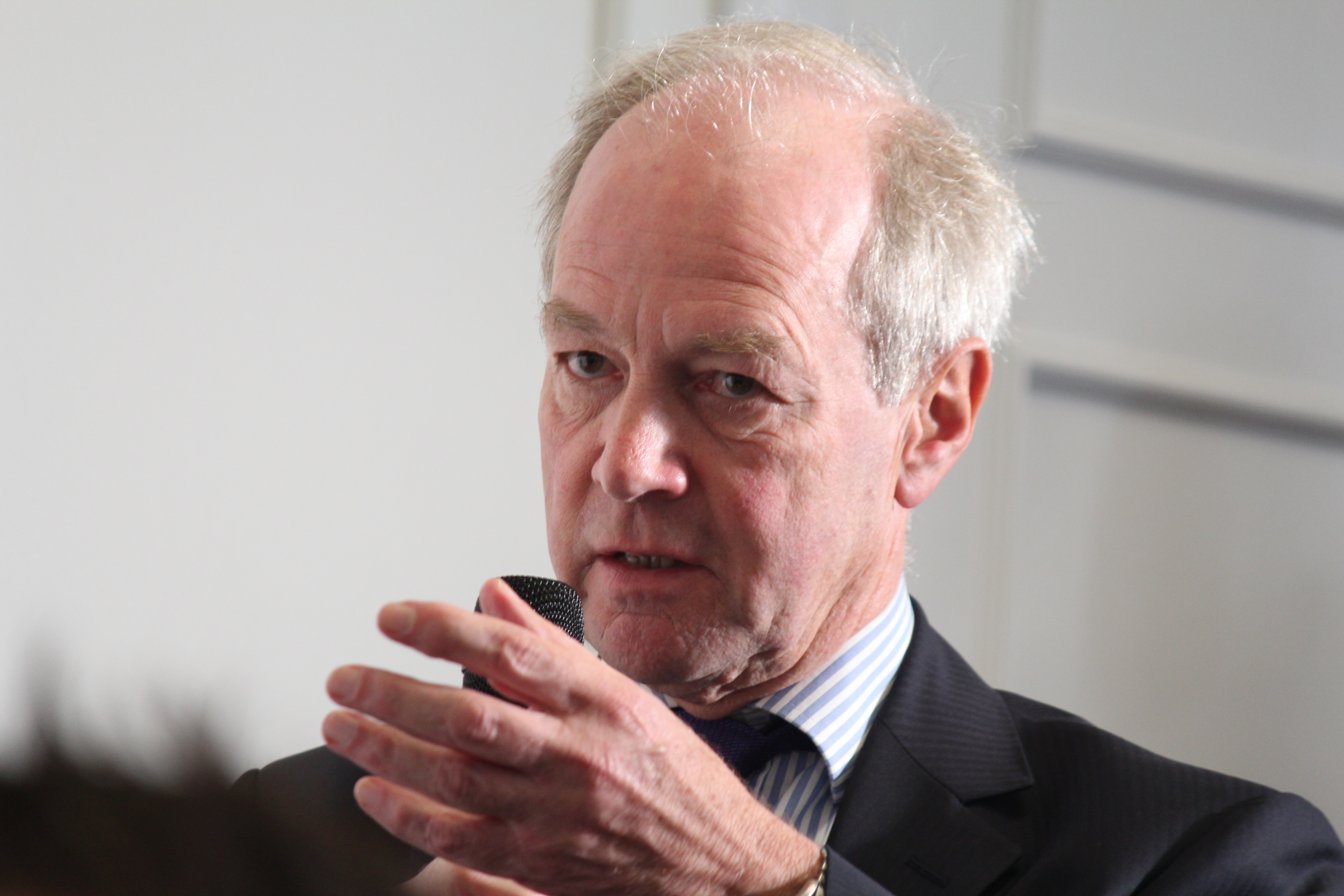
The Lord Peter Lilley of Offa

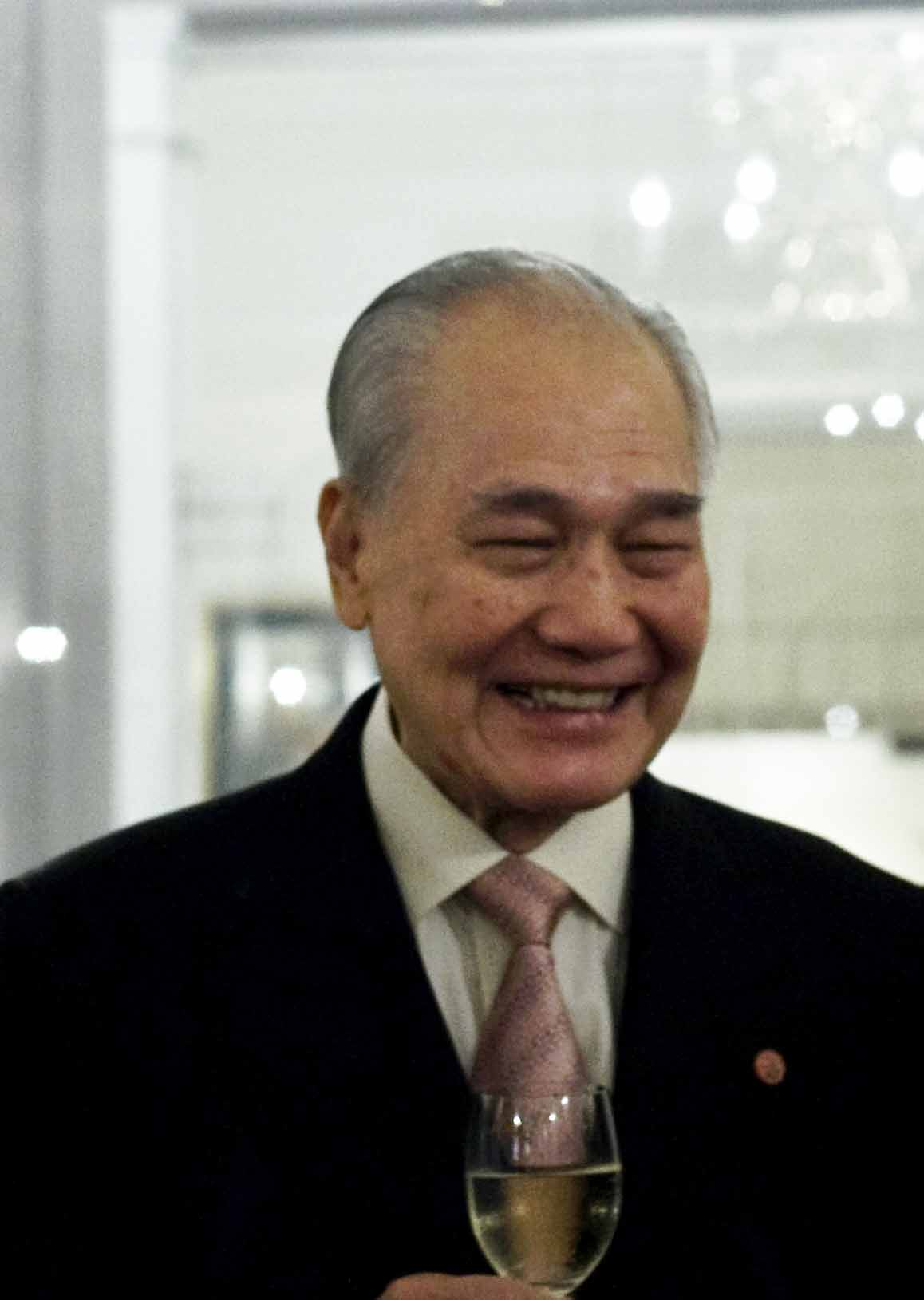
Thailand Prime Minister Anand Panyarachun

- Kweku Etrew Amua-Sekyi (1933-2007), former Justice of the Supreme Court of Ghana and Justice of the Supreme Court of the Gambia
- Jonathan Bartley (born 1971), Co-Leader of the Green Party of England and Wales and Leader of the Opposition on Lambeth Council (at Dulwich 1980–1989)
- Jon Benjamin (born 1964), former chief executive, Board of Deputies of British Jews (at Dulwich 1974–1983)
- Eric Arthur Cleugh (1894–1964), diplomat and former ambassador to Panama (at Dulwich 1907–1913)
- Sir Alexander Colin Cole (1922–2001), KCB, KCVO, long serving officer of arms at the College of Arms in London and Garter Principal King of Arms, the highest heraldic office in England
- Mark Coombs, billionaire and CEO, Ashmore Group
- William Leslie Comyn (1877– ), shipbuilder and shipowner, built first concrete ship in California, US
- Sir Horatio Davies (1842–1912), KCMG, Victorian London businessman and Lord Mayor of London
- Ian Hay Davison, first chief executive of Lloyd's of London
- Nigel Farage (born 1964), Leader of Reform UK and Member of Parliament (at Dulwich 1975–1982)
- Sir George Vandeleur Fiddes, former Permanent Under Secretary for the Colonies (1916–1921)
- David Ford, Leader of the Alliance Party of Northern Ireland and Minister of Justice for Northern Ireland
- Edward 'Eddie' George (1938–2009), Governor of the Bank of England: 49–57
- Sir Edward Harding, former Permanent Under-Secretary of State for the Dominions and High Commissioner in South Africa
- Sir Clement Hindley KCIE, former chairman of the Race-course Betting Control Board and Chief Commissioner of Railways in India
- Sir Arthur Hirtzel (1870–1937), GCB, Permanent Secretary of State for India
- Sir William Searle Holdsworth (1871–1944), OM, KC, DCL, HON LL.D, FBA, legal historian and Vinerian Professor of English Law at Oxford University, author of the 12 volume History of English Law
- Philip Hollobone, Member of Parliament: 1976–1983
- Sir John Leonard Hunt (born 1929), British Conservative Party politician
- Derek Hurlock (1920–1992), managing director and chairman of AC Cars
- Sir Gavin Lightman (1939–2020), barrister, Queen's Counsel, formerly High Court Judge of England and Wales (Chancery Division)
- Peter Lilley (born 1943), Member of Parliament 1983–2017, Life Peer
- Lord Luke of Pavenham KBE JP, businessman and did much for the British Charities Association
- Alistair Macdonald, British Labour Party politician
- Horace Brooks Marshall, 1st Baron Marshall of Chipstead, Lord Mayor of London 1918–1919
- Chris Mole, Member of Parliament for Ipswich
- Sir Ronald Norman OBE DL, businessman and author, honoured for services to urban regeneration in Newcastle and services to Teesside
- Sam Owens, CEO, Petit Tinqueur Holdings
- His Excellency Anand Panyarachun (born 1932), Prime Minister of Thailand
- Mr Justice Sir A F Peterson, Judge of the Chancery Division
- Peter Prescott (born 1943), barrister, Queen's Counsel and Deputy High Court Judge of England and Wales
- Raj Rajaratnam (born 1957), chief executive and fund manager of New York-based Galleon Group, convicted of insider trading
- Sir Colin Rimer (born 1944), Lord Justice of Appeal
- Sir John Ritblat FRICS FSVA (born 1935), property tycoon, principal donor to the John Ritblat Gallery of the British Library
- Philip Rutnam, Permanent Secretary to the Department for Transport
- Hartley Shawcross (1902–2003), lawyer and Labour politician, lead British prosecutor at the Nuremberg Trials
- John Silkin (1923–1987), Member of Parliament, brother of Samuel Silkin
- Samuel Silkin, Baron Silkin of Dulwich (1918–1988), Member of Parliament
- John Spellar (born 1947), Member of Parliament for Warley
- Sir Melford Stevenson, High Court judge
- Tin Tut, first High Commissioner for Burma in London
- Iain Vallance, Baron Vallance of Tummel, British businessman and a Liberal Democrat politician
- Sir Nicholas Wall, President of the Family Division, judge in England and Wales (at Dulwich 1956–1963)
- Roger Westbrook, British diplomat
- Cecil Whiteley (1875–1942), Common Serjeant of London; Judge at Mayor's and City of London Court

== Religion ==
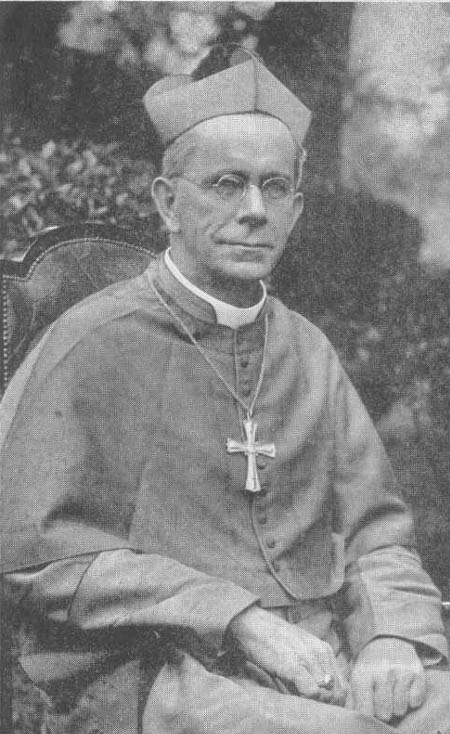
Frank Weston

- The Very Reverend Arthur Wesley Carr (born 1941), KCVO, dean of Westminster 1997–2006, Anglican divine
- The Very Reverend John Chester Hughes (born 1923)
- Right Reverend Reginald Herbert Owen, former Archbishop of New Zealand
- Rev. Canon Thomas Benjamin Watkins (1856–1933) Anglican priest.
- Frank Weston, Missionary Bishop of Zanzibar

== Science and medicine ==
Sidney Gilchrist Thomas

- Dr Alec Coppen (1923–2019), MD DSc FRCP FRCPsych
- Professor Richard Gaitskell (born 1965), Leading scientist in the search for particle dark matter at Brown University
- Sir Richard Tetley Glazebrook KCB, KCVO FRS (1854 to 1935), physicist
- Professor Clive Handler, BSc, MD, FRCP, FESC, FACC (born 1953), Consultant Cardiologist, Honorary Clinical Professor of Medicine, UCL, Author and educator.
- Harold Hartley (1878–1972)
- Colin Leslie Hewett FRSE (1909–1976), biochemist
- Professor John McKay (born 1939), mathematician
- Professor Ali Mobasheri (born 1968), president-elect, Osteoarthritis Research Society; International Professor of Musculoskeletal Physiology
- Sir Reginald Murley, KBE, TD, MS, FRCS (1916–1997)
- Robert Neal Rudmose-Brown (1879–1957)
- Tony Sale (1931–2011), British electronic engineer, computer programmer, computer hardware engineer, and historian of computing
- Professor Karol Sikora, MA, PhD, MB BChir (born 1948)
- Sidney Gilchrist Thomas (1850–1885), inventor of the process of eliminating phosphorus from iron by means of the Bessemer converter
- Colin Tudge (born 1943), British science writer
- Peter Twinn (1916–2004), mathematician and cryptographer
- Sir Cecil Wakeley, 1st Baronet KBE CB (1892–1979), president of the Royal College of Surgeons

== Sport ==
=== Athletics ===
- Emeka Udechuku, Olympic discus thrower (left 1997)
- R S Woods, twice represented Great Britain in the Olympics (in 1924 and 1928) in the shot-put

=== Cricket ===
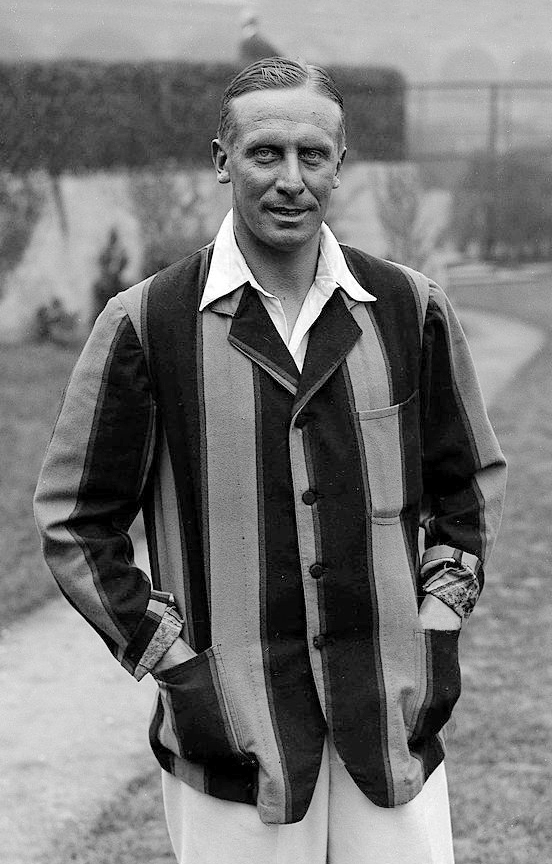
Arthur Gilligan

- Trevor Bailey (1923–2011), Essex and England cricketer: 37–42
- Hugh Tryon Bartlett (1914–1988), England Cricketer (left-handed batsman who played for Sussex and England)
- Monty Bowden (1865–1892), England cricket captain
- Ruel Brathwaite (born 1985), played first-class cricket
- Jim Dewes (born 1957), played first-class cricket for Cambridge University
- Arthur Dorman (1862–1914), played first-class cricket for Cambridge University
- James Douglas (1870–1958), England cricketer (Cambridge University (three blues) and Middlesex)
- Robert Noel Douglas (1868–1957), England cricketer (represented Cambridge University (three blues), Surrey and Middlesex as a right-handed batsman)
- Arthur Gilligan (1894–1976), England cricket captain: 06-14
- Frank William Gilligan, OBE, MA (1906–1913), cricketer
- Harold Gilligan (1896–1978), England cricket captain
- Billy Griffith (Stewart Cathie Griffith), CBE, DFC, TD (1914–1993), English cricketer and cricket administrator
- Chris Jordan (born 1988), Barbados born cricket all-rounder playing for Surrey County Cricket Club, Sussex County Cricket Club and England
- John Kiddle (1885–1954), played first-class cricket for the Europeans
- Frank King (1911–1996), represented Cambridge University and Dorset
- Roger Knight (born 1946), Surrey, Sussex and Gloucestershire cricketer and Secretary of the Marylebone Cricket Club
- Neville Knox (1884–1935), England cricketer (fast bowler)
- Vikram Kumar (born 1981), cricketer for Cambridge University and Cambridge UCCE
- Will MacVicar (born 1992), cricketer for Loughborough MCCU
- Kenelm McCloughin (1884–1915), first-class cricketer and British Army officer
- Kenneth McCormack (1887–1943), played first-class cricket for the Europeans
- Bill Mitchell (1929–2005), cricketer for Oxford University
- Eoin Morgan (born 1986), England cricketer, ODI captain and World Cup winner, plays for Middlesex; also played international cricket for Ireland
- Karl Nunes (1894–1958), West Indian cricketer who played in West Indies' first Test in their inaugural Test tour of England as wicketkeeper and captain
- Alex Rackow (born 1996), cricketer for Oxford University
- Geoffrey Rimbault CBE DSO MC DL (1908–1991), first-class cricketer
- Ernest Shattock (1887–1962), played first-class cricket for the Europeans
- W.V. Sherlock, Cricket International for Demerara (first represented Demerara in 1909) and British Guyana
- Arthur Skey (1873–1942), played first-class cricket for the Royal Navy
- Bill Thomas (1921–2000), played first-class cricket for Cambridge University
- Francis Townend (1885–1915), played first-class cricket for the Europeans

=== Hockey ===
- E.G.S.Hose, Hockey International for England (first represented England in 1897)
- P. M. Rees, Hockey International for England (first represented England in 1905) and went on to win gold at the 1908 Olympics
- Frank Solbé, Hockey International for England (first represented England in 1897)

=== Rugby union ===
See also Old Alleynian Football Club.

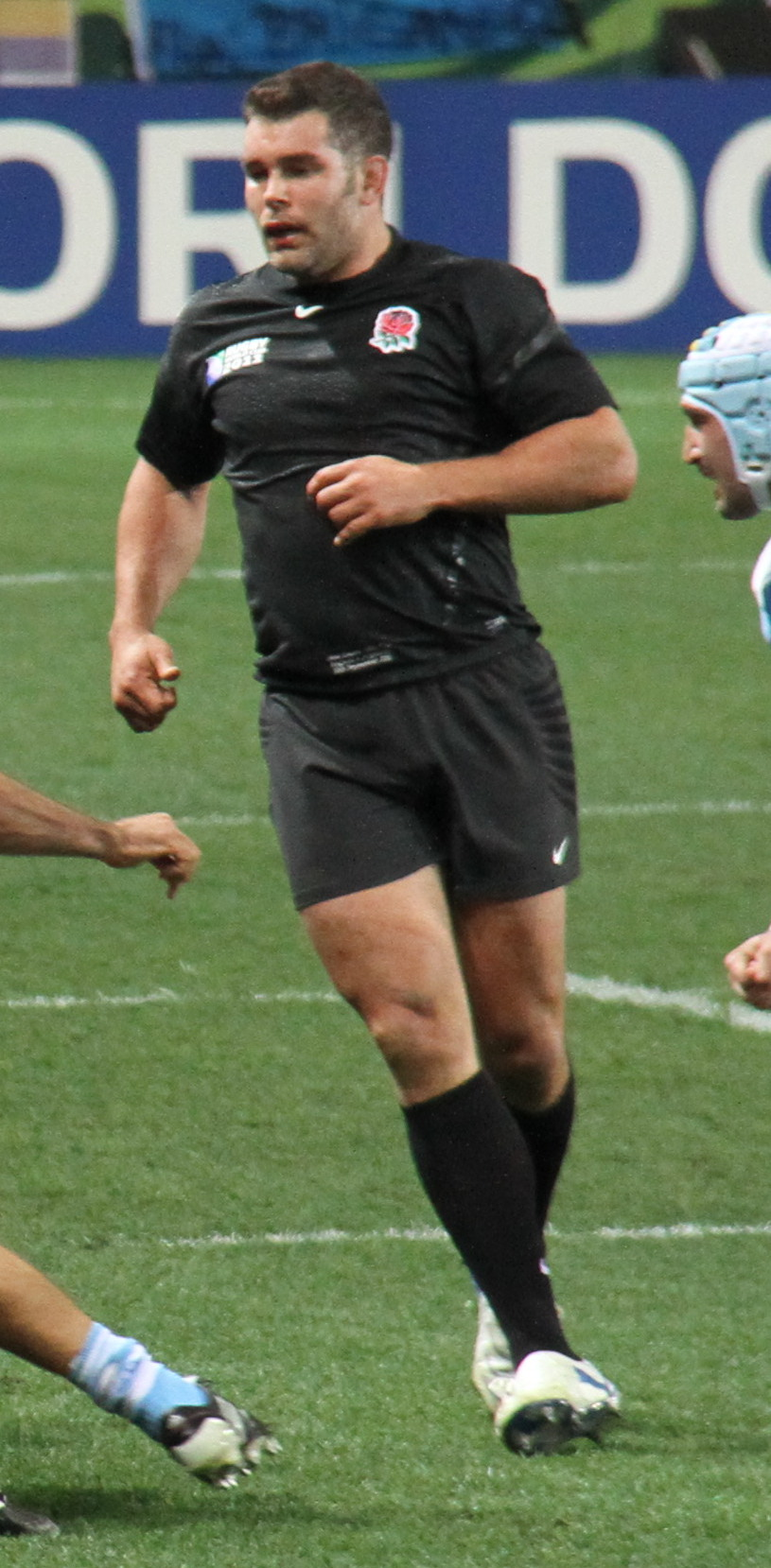
Nick Easter

- Henry Braddon, rugby union international for New Zealand All Black, represented Argentina in 1911
- E. A. Cleugh, rugby union international for Uruguay (first represented Uruguay in 1922)
- Ian Coutts (1928-1997), Scotland international (first capped 1951)
- William David Doherty, rugby union international for Ireland (first represented Ireland in 1921), later captained Ireland
- Grahame Donald, rugby union international for Scotland (first represented Scotland in 1914)
- Mark Easter (born 1982), rugby union footballer (position No. 8 or flanker), plays for Northampton Saints
- Nick Easter (born 1978), professional rugby union footballer for Harlequins and England
- S. Ellis, rugby union international for England (first represented England in 1880)
- David Flatman, prop for the England national rugby union team
- H.T.S. Gedge, rugby union international for Scotland (first represented Scotland in 1894)
- John Eric Greenwood, rugby union international for England (first represented England in 1912), later captained England
- Jock Hartley, rugby union international for England (first represented England in 1902)
- N.F. Henderson, rugby union international for Scotland (first represented Scotland in 1892)
- G. A. M. Isherwood, rugby union international for Great Britain (first represented Great Britain in 1910)
- William Leake, rugby union international for England (first represented England in 1891)
- Nick Lloyd (born 1976), rugby union player with Saracens; selected for Scotland in 2006 but had to withdraw due to injury
- E.G. Loudoun-Shand, rugby union international for Scotland (first represented Scotland in 1913)
- Group Captain Cyril Nelson "Kit" Lowe MC DFC RAF (1891–1983), English rugby union footballer representing England in 25 consecutive matches, First World War flying ace, and supposedly the inspiration for W. E. Johns' character "Biggles"
- Tom Mercey, rugby footballer, England Under 21s, club Saracens
- C.T. Mold, rugby union international for Argentina (first represented Argentina in 1911)
- JEC 'Birdie' Partridge (1879–1965), Welsh born rugby international, capped for South Africa; founded Army Rugby Union
- Andrew Sheridan (born 1979), rugby footballer for Sale Sharks and England: 90–98
- Kendrick Stark (1904–1988), England international (first capped 1927)
- David Trail (1875–1935), represented a forerunner of the British and Irish Lions, known as the Anglo-Welsh on their tour of Australasia in 1904
- A.L Wade, rugby union international for Scotland (first represented Scotland in 1908)
- Cyril Mowbray Wells (1871–1963), played rugby union for England as well as being a first-class cricketer (represented Cambridge University, Surrey and Middlesex as a right-handed batsman and bowler)
- Eric Cyprian Perry Whiteley (1904–1973), England international (first capped 1931)
Old Alleynian international rugby players

Name	Country	Caps	First capped	Last capped	Notes
Kendrick Stark (1904–1988)	England	9	15 Jan 1927	17 Mar 1928	
Eric Cyprian Perry Whiteley (1904–1973)	England	2	21 Mar 1931	6 Apr 1931	
Ian Coutts (born 1928)	Scotland	2	13 Jan 1951	15 Mar 1952	
Nick Easter (born 1978) 91–96	England	47	10 Feb 2007	10 Oct 2015	Professional club NEC Harlequins
Andrew Sheridan (born 1979) 90–98	England (United Kingdom) British and Irish Lions	40; 2	13 Nov 2004	10 Sep 2011	Professional club Sale Sharks
David Flatman (born 1980)	England	8	17 Jun 2000	22 Jun 2002	
Andy Mullins	England	1	1989	1989	
C. H. Scott	Argentina	1	1922	1922	
E. A. Cleugh	Uruguay	1	1922	1922	
C. T. Mold	Argentina	1	1910	1910	
Cyril Mowbray Wells (1871–1963)	England	6	4 Mar 1893	13 Mar 1897	Also a first-class cricketer (represented Cambridge University, Surrey and Middlesex as a right-handed batsman and bowler)
Cyril Nelson "Kit" Lowe MC DFC RAF (1891–1983)	England	25	4 Jan 1913	2 Apr 1923	Represented England in 25 consecutive matches, First World War flying ace, and supposedly the inspiration for W. E. Johns' character "Biggles"
Sidney Ellis (1859–1937)	England	1	30 Jan 1880	30 Jan 1880	
Henry Braddon (1863–1955)	New Zealand	3	31 May 1884	14 July 1884	The first New Zealand team was selected in 1884, for a tour to New South Wales. The team played its first match at home, against a Wellington XV, before recording eight wins in eight matches in Australia.
William David Doherty (1893–1966)	Ireland	7	14 Feb 1920	9 Apr 1921	Later captained Ireland
David Grahame Donald (1891–1976)	Scotland	2	7 Feb 1914	28 Feb 1914	
William Leake (1865–1942)	England	3	3 Jan 1891	7 Mar 1891	
Nelson Henderson (1865–1943)	Scotland	1	20 Feb 1892	20 Feb 1892	
Albert Wade (1884–1917)	Scotland	1	21 Mar 1908	21 Mar 1908	
G. A. M. Isherwood (1889–1974)	(United Kingdom) British Isles	3	6 Aug 1910	3 Sep 1910	
Eric Loudoun-Shand (1893–1972)	Scotland	1	15 Mar 1913	15 Mar 1913	
J. E. "Jenny" Greenwood (1891–1975)	England	13	8 Apr 1912	20 Mar 1920	Later captained England
Jock Hartley (1879–1960)	England	2	9 Mar 1901	15 Mar 1902	
Henry Gedge (1870–1943)	Scotland	6	3 Feb 1894	11 Mar 1899	
JEC Partridge (1879–1965)	South Africa	1	26 Aug 1903	26 Aug 1903	Born in Wales, "Birdie" Partridge was a lieutenant in the Welsh Regiment in the Boer War and joined Pretoria Harlequins then the Transvaal and was capped by the Springboks against the British Team of 1903. He played 18 times for the Barbarians between 1905–15 and was in their first international match (vs Wales). He also founded the Army Rugby Union.
David Trail (1875–1935)	(United Kingdom) Anglo-Welsh	4	2 Jul 1904	13 Aug 1904	

=== Other ===
- A. F. Engelbach, Badminton International for England (first represented England in 1921)
- Raymond Dennis Keene, OBE (born 1948), Chess Grandmaster: 59–66
- Oliver Lam-Watson (born 1991), Paralympic fencer, won silver and bronze at the 2020 Summer Paralympics
- Kieran West MBE (born 1977), Olympic champion oarsman: 86–95
- John Jayne, (born 1997), Olympic judoka, Paris 2024
