= Old Alleynian F.C. =

English rugby union club, based in London

(England) Old Alleynians
- Full name: Old Alleynian Football Club
- Union: Kent RFU
- Nickname: OAs
- Founded: 1898; 128 years ago
- Location: Dulwich, Southwark, London, England
- Ground: Dulwich Common
- Chairman: (England) Phil Kent
- Coach(es): (England) Ned Barker, (England) Charlie Thompson, (England) Laurence Boyle, (England) Josh Winduss
- Captain: (England) Gill Crouch
- League: Regional 1 South Central
- 2025–26: 4th
| 1st kit | 2nd kit |

Official website
- www.oarfc.rfu.club

The Old Alleynian Football Club is an open rugby union club founded as a team for the old boys of Dulwich College, themselves known as Old Alleynians. Founded in 1898, it is one of the oldest clubs in London and was the last of London's old boys clubs to become a fully open club. It is notable not only for its longevity, but also for the prominence it once attained on the club circuit and for the number of eminent players that have been members of the club, some of whom gained their international caps whilst at the club.

The club runs four senior sides and have a flourishing junior set up with many players going onto to play 1st team rugby. After winning London 3 South West in 2011–12 the 1st XV had been competing at Level 7 until 2022–23 when they finished champions of Counties 1 Kent, promoting them to Level 6 Regional 2 South East where they won consecutive league championships in the 2023–24 season for the first time in their history, promoting them to Level 5 Regional 1 South Central for the 2024–25 season. As part of a league structure revamp the RFU allowed 2nd and 3rd teams compete in the leagues from the 2022–23 season onwards. OA's entered a 2nd XV at level 9 Counties 3 Kent, and won promotion to Counties 2 Kent during the 2023–24 season for finishing runner- up. The 3rd team were successful in winning Kent Metropolitan League A during the 2023–24 season and entered the league system at Level 11 Counties 5 Kent for the 2024–25 season. The 4th XV play in the Kent Metropolitan Leagues, winning the league in 2022–23 and finishing runner-up in 2023–24.

== History ==
Dulwich College had been playing football using Rugby School rules since 1858 and the school had been playing against scratch sides of old boys since the 1890s. In October 1897 a former pupil of Dulwich College wrote to the school magazine (The Alleynian) bemoaning the fact that despite the school having an old boy representative "in almost all the first-class football clubs" the fact that it did not have an old schoolboy team, "such as Old Merchant Taylors, Old Leysians, Old Carthusians, Marlborough Nomads", meant that it was missing out on "the greater athletic reputation [it] would otherwise have obtained." Within a few months R.M. Everett, a member of the school's first XV, and William Leake, an Assistant Master at the school and former Cambridge rugger Blue, had joined forces to promote the formation of the club. In June 1898 Leake published an invitation in "The Alleynian" to "all OAs desirous of joining". In September 1898, the club played its first match, drawing with Croydon 3rds (Croydon FC being the name by which Old Whitgiftians were known at the time). On 8 October 1898, the club's first general meeting was held, rules approved, officers elected and the dark blue, light blue and black hooped jerseys were decided upon.

The club was regarded as one of the best in London by 1913 and in that year five of its players, who had all played together in the school's 1st XV, were selected to play in the Varsity Match. The five were J. E. Greenwood, Cyril Lowe, Eric Loudoun-Shand, Graham Donald and W. D. Doherty. They were known at the school as the "famous five", having played in an unbeaten school side, all going on to play in the Varsity Match and all going on to represent their countries, two as captain.

In World War I the club lost 76 members but Leake, "Slacker" Christison and Major Everett revived the club by 1919 and the club (and therefore the school to which it was affiliated) produced the captains of both Oxford and Cambridge in the Varsity Match. This was the first and only team this had happened. The 1920s saw the clubs strength grow and it produced its first international cap (to be won by a player playing for the club) in 1927 in the person of Kendrick Stark. In 1931 Eric Whiteley repeated the distinction. The club had over 600 members and was beating clubs like Rosslyn Park.

The Second World War took a heavy toll on the members, with 49 losing their lives. So weakened was the club that it merged with its oldest of rivals, Old Whitgiftians, for a year in 1945. A modest resurgence took place at the turn of the decade, with Ian Coutts gaining his Scottish caps, and the likes of London Irish, London Welsh and Wasps falling to the OAs. However, by the late 1960s the OAs played strong local opposition rather than "1st class" clubs. In the 1980s the club continued to be strong, arguably the strongest of all Old Boys clubs in London, with the topping of the Combined London Old Boys Merit Table in 1988 as testament to this. In 1987 the league system introduction led to the club being placed in the Courage League London South 2. In 1989 the club were promoted to London One, won the Surrey Rugby Union Cup, topped the Combined London Old Boys Merit Table once again and qualified for the Middlesex Sevens Finals.

A second Surrey Cup win in 1992 was followed by a three year slide, seeing the club drop three divisions to London 3 South West. In 1995 the Old Alleynians became the last of the Old Boys clubs to become fully open membership.

The 1999–00 season was to see another slide down the leagues with three successive relegations to level 10 playing in Surrey 2.

The 2002–03 season saw the start of a resurgence and stability under the captaincy of James Franklin and Tim Sandars, when Old Alleynians beat Shipston upon Stour 16–10 in the final of the Powergen Junior Vase, held at Twickenham, with future Nothampton and Sale Number 8, Mark Easter starting in the match. From 2003 the coaching position was held by old Dulwich schoolmaster Rick Wilson, and under his guidance OA's gained two runner-up promotions from Surrey 2 during the 2005–06 season and from Surrey 1 during the 2007–08 season. Four years at level 8 London 3 South West were to follow, when under the captaincy of ex-Cambridge blue Johnathan Wright OA's were crowned champions in the 2011–12 season and promoted to level 7 London 2 South West for 2012–13.

After staving off relegation on the final day of the 2012–13 season with a 26–24 victory away at Portsmouth, OA's began to establish themselves as level 7 side. During a ten year stay at this level there were notable appearances from future Bristol and Ospreys winger Toby Fricker (2013–14 season), and Saracens and England Hooker Theo Dan (2018–19 season).

The 2022–23 season, under captains turned coaches James Knox and Charlie Thompson, saw OA's win their first league and national cup double. OA's secured the league championship of Counties 1 Kent in February of that season, with a club record 90–7 win against Charlton Park gaining promotion to level 6 Regional 2 South East for the first time since the 1993–94 season. In May 2023, Twickenham Stadium would once again play host to a successful national cup run, gained with victories over Grasshoppers RFC (44–42), Wimborne (29–17), Dagenham (44–27) and Chobham (29–17) culminating in a 34–7 victory over Harlow in the inaugural Papa Johns Community Cup.

The 2023–24 season saw OA's success continue, as back to back promotions were secured with a 29–13 victory, and 10th consecutive win, at Medway on the final day of the season gaining promotion to Regional 1 South Central. The 2024–25 season saw OA's compete at level 5 for the first time since a four season stint between 1989–93.

In April 2024, Fiona McIntosh became the first Old Alleynian woman to earn an international cap when she was selected for Scotland against the country of her birth, England.

== Ground ==
The club played on the Norwood club's ground in Norwood Park between 1899 and 1901. A semi-nomadic existence then ensued as the club moved on a yearly basis from Elm Grive, Sydenham to Cavendish Road, Merton to Horn Park Farm, Lee. Then in 1905 the Dulwich Estate allowed the club to settle at Dulwich Common where they play to this day. In 2003 a fire saw the club lose half of its clubhouse, which was rebuilt shortly afterwards.

== Notable former players ==
=== Notable chiefly as rugby players ===
==== International caps whilst playing for OAs ====
- - Kendrick Stark (1904–1988), England international (first capped 1927)
- - Eric Cyprian Perry Whiteley (1904–1973), England international (first capped 1931)
- - Ian Coutts (1928–1997), Scotland international (first capped 1951)

=== Internationals and first class players ===
==== Professional era ====
- Theo Dan (Hooker) (b. 2000), professional rugby union player for Saracens and England (12 Caps).
- Fiona McIntosh (Second Row) (b. 1999), professional rugby union player for Richmond, Saracens, Edinburgh and Scotland (1 Cap)
- Toby Fricker (Wing) (b. 1995), professional rugby union player for Bristol and Ospreys.
- Beno Obano (Prop) (b. 1994), professional rugby union player for Bath and England (4 Caps)
- Tom O'Flaherty (rugby union) (Wing) (b. 1994), professional rugby union player for Ospreys, Exeter Chiefs and Sale.
- Tom Mercey (Prop) (b. 1987), ex-professional rugby union player for Northampton Saints and England U20's.
- Mark Easter (No. 8 or Flanker) (b. 1982), ex-professional rugby union player for Northampton Saints and Sale Sharks.
- David Flatman (Prop) (b. 1980), ex-professional rugby union player for Saracens, Bath and England (8 Caps).
- Andrew Sheridan (Prop) (b. 1979), ex-professional rugby union player for Sale Sharks, England (40 Caps) and British & Irish Lions (2005) & (2009).
- Nick Easter (No. 8) (b. 1978), ex-professional rugby union player for NEC Harlequins and England (54 Caps).
- Sam Blythe (Hooker) (b. 1976) ex-professional rugby union player for Exeter Chiefs.
- Nick Lloyd (Prop) (b. 1976) ex-professional rugby union player for Saracens; selected for Scotland in 2006 but had to withdraw due to injury.

==== Amateur era ====
- Argentina - C. H. Scott Rugby Union International for Argentina (first represented Argentina in 1922)
- Argentina - C. T. Mold (b. 1885) Rugby union international for Argentina (first represented Argentina in 1911)
- Argentina - K. G. Drysdale Rugby union international for Argentina (first represented Argentina in 1911)
- Argentina - W. H. Bridger Rugby union international for Argentina (first represented Argentina in 1911)
- British & Irish Lions - George Isherwood (1889–1974) Rugby union international for Great Britain (first represented Great Britain in 1910)
- British & Irish Lions - David Trail (1875–1935), represented a forerunner of the British & Irish Lions, known as the Anglo-Welsh on their tour of Australasia in 1904.
- England - Cyril Mowbray Wells (1871–1963) – Played Rugby Union for England as well as being a first-class cricketer (represented Cambridge University, Surrey and Middlesex as a Right-handed and bowler.)
- England - Group Captain Cyril Nelson "Kit" Lowe MC DFC RAF (1891–1983) English rugby union footballer representing England in 25 consecutive matches, First World War flying ace, and supposedly the inspiration for W. E. Johns' character "Biggles".
- England - Jock Hartley (1879–1960) Rugby union international for England (first represented England in 1902)
- England - J. E. Greenwood (1891–1975) Rugby union international for England (first represented England in 1912) Later captained England.
- Ireland - W. D. Doherty (1893–1966) Rugby union international for Ireland (first represented Ireland in 1921) Later captained Ireland
- Scotland - E. G. Loudoun-Shand (1893–1972) Rugby union international for Scotland (first represented Scotland in 1913)
- Scotland - Grahame Donald (1891–1976) Rugby union international for Scotland (first represented Scotland in 1914)
- Scotland - A. L. Wade (1884–1917) Rugby union international for Scotland (first represented Scotland in 1908)
- Uruguay - E. A. Cleugh (1894–1964) – Rugby Union International for Uruguay (first represented Uruguay in 1922)
- Uruguay - C. E. Cat Rugby Union International for Uruguay (first represented Uruguay in 1922)
- Uruguay - J. M. Cat – Rugby Union International for Uruguay (first represented Uruguay in 1922)
- Uruguay - L. P. Bridal – Rugby Union International for Uruguay (first represented Uruguay in 1922)

=== Notable chiefly in other fields ===
- Edward Dolman
- Edward George, Baron George
- Roger Knight

== Honours ==
- London 2 South, Regional 2 South East Champions (2):
  - 1988–89, 2023–24
- Counties 1 Kent Champions:
  - 2022–23
- London 3 South West Champions:
  - 2011–12
- Papa Johns Community Cup Winners:
  - 2022–23
- RFU Junior Vase Winners:
  - 2002–03
- Surrey Cup Winners (2):
  - 1989, 1992

== See also ==
- Category:People educated at Dulwich College
- Dulwich College
