= Alex Rackow =

English cricketer

Personal information
- Full name: Alexander Joseph William Rackow
- Born: 25 December 1996 (age 29); Wandsworth, London, England
- Batting: Right-handed
- Bowling: Right-arm off break

Domestic team information
- Years: Team
- 2017–2019: Oxford University
- 2017-2019: Oxford MCCU

Career statistics
Competition	First-class
Matches	4
Runs scored	218
Batting average	54.50
100s/50s	–/2
Top score	95
Catches/stumpings	2/–
- Source: Cricinfo, 22 June 2020

Alexander Joseph William Rackow (born 25 December 1996) is an English former first-class cricketer. He made 4 First Class appearances between 2017 and 2019.

== Early life and career ==
Rackow was born at Wandsworth in December 1996. He was educated at Dulwich College (2010–15), before going up to St Hilda's College, Oxford (2016–19). While studying at Oxford, Rackow made three appearances in first-class cricket for Oxford University against Cambridge University in The University Matches of 2017, 2018 and 2019. He scored 218 runs in his three matches, averaging 54.50. He made two half centuries, with a high score of 95. He gained three cricketing blues, captaining the blues in his final year and was the first Old Alleynian since Bill Mitchell to gain an Oxford blue in cricket. In addition to playing for Oxford University, Rackow also made a single first-class appearance for Oxford MCCU against Kent in 2018 at Canterbury. (Note: Oxford MCCU differed from Oxford University Cricket Club in that it was open to students at Oxford Brookes University, whereas Oxford University Cricket Club is exclusively for students of the constituent colleges of the University of Oxford.)

Rackow is currently training to become a solicitor.
