= Ali Mobasheri =

Physiologist

- Born: Tehran, Iran
- Education: Imperial College London, University of Toronto, University of Oxford
- Scientific career
- Fields: Biochemistry, Physiology
- Workplaces: University of Oulu

Ali Mobasheri (Persian: علی مباشری) is a professor of Musculoskeletal Physiology at University of Oulu in Finland. He was educated at Dulwich College an independent school for boys in Dulwich, southeast London and is included on the List of Old Alleynians. He obtained his BSc from Imperial College London, his MSc from the University of Toronto and his DPhil from Wolfson College, Oxford at the University of Oxford. He has published more than 250 papers in leading scientific journals.

== Selected bibliography ==
- Facilitative Glucose Transporters in Articular Chondrocytes (2008)
- Diverse Roles of Integrin Receptors in Articular Cartilage (2008)
- Potassium ion channels in articular chondrocytes. Putative roles in mechanotransduction, metabolic regulation and cell proliferation. In: Mechanosensitive Ion Channels (2008)
- Applications of tissue microarrays in renal physiology and pathology. In: Renal and Urinary Proteomics: Methods and Protocols (2010)
- Nutraceuticals: from Research to Legal and Regulatory Affairs. In: Nonpharmacological Therapies in the Management of Osteoarthritis (2011)
- From Multipotent Cells to Fully Differentiated Connective Tissue Cells for Regenerative Medicine: Emerging Applications of Mesenchymal Stem Cells. In: Regenerative Medicine and Tissue Engineering: Cells and Biomaterials (2011)
- Three-Dimensional, High-Density and Tissue Engineered Culture Models of Articular Cartilage. In: Replacing animal models: a practical guide to creating and using biomimetic alternatives (2012)
