= Edward Dolman =

Art business executive

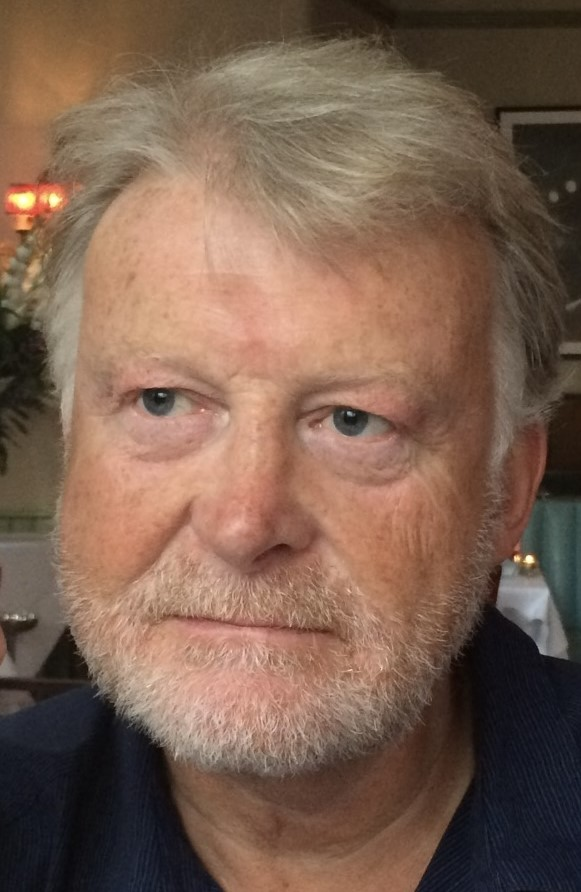
- Born: Edward James Dolman; 24 February 1960 (age 66); London, UK
- Education: University of Southampton
- Occupations: Art business executive and advisor
- Known for: Former CEO of Christie's and Phillips
- Title: Co-founder, Dolman Partners and New Perspectives Art Partners
- Children: 2

Edward James Dolman (born 24 February 1960) is a British art business executive and advisor. The former longtime CEO and Chairman of Christie's International PLC and Phillips Auctioneers is principal in Dolman Partners with his son Alex Dolman. In June 2025, with three other leading art market figures - Brett Gorvy, Phillip Hoffman and Patti Wong - they announced the launch of New Perspectives Art Partners, a consulting firm that advises art collectors and institutions.

== Early life ==
Dolman was born in 1960 in Wimbledon, London to James William Dolman, Esq., Senior Partner, Bircham & Co., and Jean Dolman, a special education teacher. As a secondary-school pupil he played rugby, and soon led his school's team as captain. He continued his rugby career in university and well into his early adult years, when he captained the Old Alleynian Football Club from 1982 to 1985.

== Education ==
Dolman was educated at Dulwich College and the University of Southampton.

== Career ==
From 2014 to 2025, Dolman served as Executive Chairman and chief executive officer of Phillips.

From 2011 to 2014, he was Director of the office of Her Excellency Sheikha Al-Mayassa bint Hamad bin Khalifa Al-Thani, Chairperson of the Qatar Museums Authority. He was later additionally appointed Acting Chief Executive Officer of the Qatar Museums. Dolman managed the development of Qatar's ambitious program for the cultural sector, including museums. He also led the cultural exchange partnership, the "Year of Culture," where he oversaw the Qatar and United Kingdom exchange with Charles, Prince of Wales as the ambassador.

Preceding his time in the Middle East, Dolman had a 27-year career at Christie's, where he rose to chairman of the Board of Christie's International. In 1999, at the age of 39, he was appointed chief executive officer, a position he held for 11 years. Dolman joined Christie's in 1984 as a porter, quickly rising to specialist in English Furniture. Later roles included managing director of Christie's Amsterdam, Commercial Director of Christie's Europe and managing director, Christie's Americas. Following Dolman's late-1999 appointment as CEO, he led the company through the settlement and aftermath of a U.S. Department of Justice antitrust investigation. Rebuilding the company's reputation, he oversaw several groundbreaking auctions, including 2001's Gaffé Collection, sold on behalf of UNICEF and representing its single largest donation; the 2006 sale of five works by Gustav Klimt restituted by the Austrian State to Maria Altmann and her family; and the Yves Saint Laurent sale in 2009. During Dolman's tenure as CEO he expanded the company's global growth, developing the market in China, gaining market share and achieving significant sales growth.

== Awards ==
Officier of the Legion of Honour 2011

Chevalier of the Legion of Honour 2007

== Board memberships ==
Board memberships have included the International Advisory Board of Qatar Museums, the Governing Board of the Courtauld Institute of Art, the Seoul International Business Advisory Council, and the environmental charity Sailors for the Sea.

== Personal life ==
Dolman is married and has two adult children. He is a seasoned sailor and the owner of a Swan 68.
