= Nelson Henderson =

Scotland international rugby union player

- Born: Nelson Faviell Henderson; 24 September 1865 London, England
- Died: 16 June 1943 (aged 77) Blewbury, Berkshire, England
- School: Dulwich College

Rugby union career
- Position: Forward
Amateur team(s)
Years	Team	Apps	(Points)
- Oxford University
–	London Scottish		
Provincial / State sides
Years	Team	Apps	(Points)
1892	West of Scotland District		
International career
Years	Team	Apps	(Points)
1892	Scotland	1	(0)

Nelson Faviell Henderson (24 September 1865 – 16 June 1943) was a Scotland international rugby union player.

== Rugby Union career ==
=== Amateur career ===
He attended Dulwich College, Fettes College and Magdalen College.

At Oxford University he played for the varsity fifteen and obtained his blue in 1887. In the early 1890s he played for London Scottish.

=== Provincial career ===
He played for West of Scotland District in 1892, while with London Scottish.

=== International career ===
Henderson made his international debut on 20 February 1892 at Edinburgh in the Scotland versus Ireland match, which was won by Scotland.

== Business career ==
Nelson Henderson became involved in his father's publishing business, James Henderson & Sons, and became its chairman after his father's retirement in 1900. The business went into liquidation in 1920.

== Family ==
Nelson Henderson was the son of the publisher James Henderson.
