= Geoffrey Rimbault =

English first class cricketer

Personal information
- Full name: Geoffrey Acworth Rimbault
- Born: 17 April 1908; Streatham, Surrey, England
- Died: 20 October 1991 (aged 83); Bovey Tracey, Devon, England
- Batting: Right-handed

Domestic team information
- Years: Team
- 1934/35: Europeans

Career statistics
| Competition | First-class |
|---|---|
| Matches | 2 |
| Runs scored | 31 |
| Batting average | 10.33 |
| 100s/50s | –/– |
| Top score | 16 |
| Catches/stumpings | 3/– |
- Source: ESPNcricinfo, 25 April 2019

Geoffrey Acworth Rimbault CBE DSO MC DL (17 April 1908 – 20 October 1991) was an English first-class cricketer and British Army officer. Starting his military career as a non-commissioned officer, he was later commissioned in June 1928. He spent the majority of his military career with the Loyal Regiment (North Lancashire), serving in the Second World War during which he was awarded the Distinguished Service Order. He retired from active service in 1961, but served as the Loyal Regiment's final regimental colonel until 1970. During his military career he played first-class cricket in British India for the Europeans cricket team, as well as appearing in England for the British Army cricket team. In later life, he served as a deputy lieutenant of Surrey.

== Life and military career ==
The son of Arthur Henry Rimbault, he was born at Streatham and educated at Dulwich College. From Dulwich he served as a non-commissioned officer in the Territorial Army with the cavalry squadron in both the Inns of Court Regiment and the 12th London Regiment (The Rangers). He became a commissioned officer when he was made a second lieutenant in The Rangers in June 1928. He transferred to the Loyal Regiment (North Lancashire) in February 1930. with promotion to the rank of lieutenant coming in February 1933. While serving in British India, Rimbault made his debut in first-class cricket for the Europeans against the Hindus at Bombay in the 1934–35 Bombay Quadrangular. He was appointed as a staff captain to British Troops in Palestine and Transjordan in September 1936, and was awarded the Military Cross in November of the same year. Returning to England, he was appointed as an instructor at the Small Arms School at Hythe, Kent in May 1938. He made a second appearance in first-class cricket in the same year, appearing for the British Army cricket team against Cambridge University at Fenner's. He was promoted to rank of captain in August 1938.

== World War II and later life ==
Rimbault served with the Loyal Regiment (North Lancashire) during the Second World War, seeing action in North Africa, Anzio, Italy and Palestine. He held several commands during the course of the war, including as commanding officer of the 1st Battalion The Loyal Regiment. He was awarded the Distinguished Service Order in the 1945 Birthday Honours for gallant and distinguished service during the Italian campaign. He was promoted to the rank of major after the war in July 1946. He was made a brevet lieutenant colonel in July 1951, with him obtaining the full rank in August 1952. He was made a CBE in the 1954 Birthday Honours. He was promoted to the rank of colonel in December 1954, with promotion to the rank of brigadier coming in June 1958. In February in 1959, he was made the regimental colonel of the Loyal Regiment, a ceremonial position he would hold until 1970.

He retired from active in July 1961, at which point he was placed on the Reserve of Officers list. He joined the Mercers' Company in 1961, the same year in which he took up the position of director of the Army Sport Control Board. He exceeded the age for recall in April 1966, upon which he was removed from the list. He relinquished his ceremonial position as regimental colonel of the Loyal Regiment in March 1970, at which point the regiment was amalgamated with The Lancashire Regiment (Prince of Wales's Volunteers) to form the Queen's Lancashire Regiment. In the same year he was made a deputy lieutenant of Surrey. He was a master of the Mercers' Company in 1970–71, and relinquished his position as director of the Army Sport Control Board in 1973. He was a life vice-president of Surrey County Cricket Club and served as its president in 1982–83. He died at Bovey Tracey in October 1991, at the age of 83.
