= John Eric Greenwood =

England international rugby union player

Jenny Greenwood
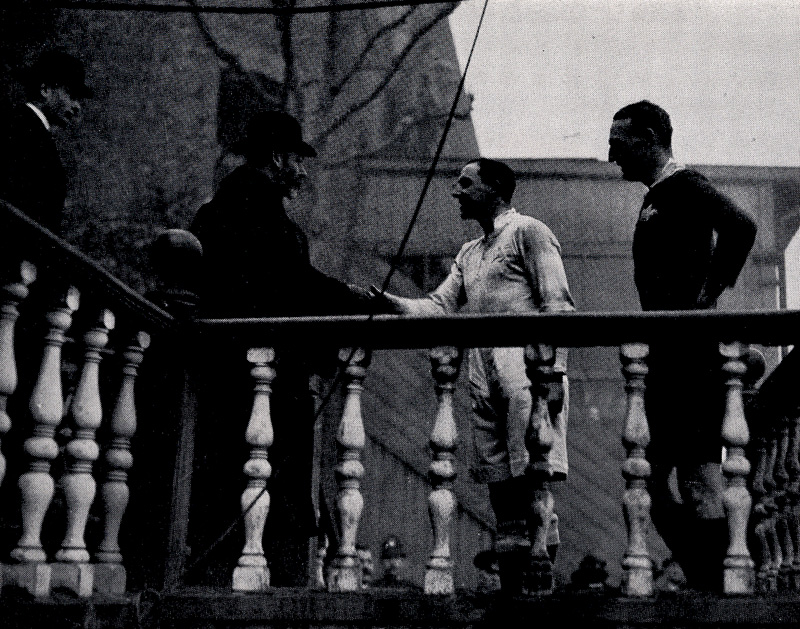
- Loudoun-Shand (Oxford) and JE Greenwood (Cambridge) meeting King George V at the 1919 Varsity match
- Born: John Eric Greenwood; 23 July 1891 Lewisham, England
- Died: 23 July 1975 (aged 84) (registered in) Poole, Dorset
- School: Dulwich College
- University: Cambridge University

Rugby union career
- Position: Forward
Amateur team(s)
Years	Team	Apps	(Points)
–	Cambridge University		
–	Harlequins		
–	Old Alleynians		
–	Barbarian F.C.		
International career
Years	Team	Apps	(Points)
1912–1920	England	13	(Pts:30;)

John Eric Greenwood (known as Jenny Greenwood) (23 July 1891 – 3 July 1975) was an England rugby union international, businessman and rugby administrator. He won 13 caps for England between 1912 and 1920 and captained both Cambridge University and England. Outside rugby he spent much of his career with the Nottingham-based pharmaceutical retailer Boots Pure Drug Company, becoming a director in 1920 and later joint vice-chairman of the company. He also served as President of the Rugby Football Union in the mid-1930s and held a number of public appointments in Britain.

== Early life and family ==
Greenwood was born on 23 July 1891 in Lewisham, Kent, the son of Thomas Greenwood, a Baptist minister, and Harriet Greenwood (née Summersell). His father was a prominent figure in the Baptist community of south London and served as pastor of the Norbury Baptist Church.

Greenwood grew up in a large family and had several siblings, including Thomas Greenwood, Herbert S. Greenwood, Harry Dealey Greenwood, Winifred P. Greenwood and Leonard Montague Greenwood. His brother Leonard Montague Greenwood later served as an officer in the Durham Light Infantry during the First World War and died in 1919 following illness contracted during military service. The family lived at White Lodge on Streatham Common in south London.

Greenwood was educated at Dulwich College, where he developed into a leading rugby player before continuing his education at King's College, Cambridge.

== Rugby union career ==
Greenwood learnt his rugby at Dulwich College, before which he had been a keen soccer player. Whilst there he played in an unbeaten first XV in 1909 which contained five future internationals dubbed the 'Famous Five'. These five would all go on to play in the 1913 Varsity match, (and also produced the captains of both Oxford and Cambridge in 1919), and all served in the First World War. They were Eric Loudoun-Shand and Grahame Donald who both went on to play for Scotland, William David Doherty who went on to play for and captain Ireland, Greenwood himself who went on to play for and captain England and the record-breaking Cyril Lowe.

From Dulwich College, Greenwood went to Cambridge University. He was selected to play as a Centre in the 1912 varsity match, and also made his international debut on 8 April 1912 at Parc des Princes in the France vs England match. He was again selected for the 1913 varsity match and again played for England. On his team were two of his former school teammates, CN Lowe and George Doherty, on the opposing side were Eric Loudoun-Shand and Graham Donald also from Dulwich. His international career was then interrupted by the outbreak of the First World War.

He did return to international rugby, and also made a return for Cambridge University in 1919. He captained the side and his opposing captain was his former school teammate Loudoun-Shand. It was due to a chance encounter with Eric Loudoun-Shand that Greenwood was allowed to captain the Cambridge side that year. It was within the prerogative of the Oxford captain to deny Cambridge the chance to field Greenwood, who had left the University just prior to the war. However, the long association proved to be to Greenwood's good fortune. Eric Loudoun-Shand played that match with a severely injured arm, an injury from the Great War. So bad was this injury that he later had to have the arm amputated.

Of the 13 matches Greenwood played for his national side he was on the winning side on 11 occasions. He played his final match for England on 20 March 1920 at Twickenham in the England vs Scotland match.

Greenwood also played club rugby for Harlequins, Old Alleynians and the Barbarian F.C., appearing in 13 matches for the Barbarians. In 1920 he captained England and helped guide the team to a share of the Five Nations Championship.

== Military service ==
During the First World War Greenwood served in the British Army. He served in the East Surrey Regiment and later held the rank of captain in the Grenadier Guards. He was mentioned in dispatches during the war and was wounded in action. After the war he returned briefly to Cambridge and resumed rugby before beginning his professional career.

== Business career ==
Greenwood spent most of his working life with the Nottingham-based pharmaceutical company Boots Pure Drug Company, commonly known as Boots. The company had been founded by Jesse Boot, 1st Baron Trent, whose family remained closely involved in the management of the firm during Greenwood’s early career.

Greenwood joined Boots as a chartered accountant and quickly rose through the administrative ranks. He became a director of Boots Pure Drug Company in June 1920. During his early period with the firm Greenwood became closely acquainted with the Boot family and at one stage lived with the founder’s family, reflecting his close personal relationship with Jesse Boot and his successors within the company.

By the 1920s and 1930s he served as director of a number of related companies within the Boots organisation, including Boots Cash Chemists (Eastern), Boots Cash Chemists (Lancashire) and Boots Cash Chemists (Northern). In 1939 he was the financial director and expense controller of Boots.

In October 1951 Greenwood was appointed joint vice-chairman of Boots, remaining on the board until his retirement in 1953.

== Public service ==
Greenwood also undertook a number of public and governmental roles. He served on the Civil Service Arbitration Tribunal from 1936 to 1949. During the Second World War he was appointed to the Catering Wages Commission, which examined wage regulation in the hospitality sector. In 1950 he was appointed a member of the Royal Commission on the Taxation of Profits and Income, chaired by Lord Justice Cohen.

He also served as a Justice of the Peace for Nottingham from 1947 to 1953.

== Personal and later life ==
In September 1921 Greenwood married Doris Mary Radford, daughter of Nottingham lace manufacturer Alfred Charles Radford. The couple lived for many years in Nottingham, including at Lenton Mount in the Lenton district.

Greenwood later retired to Wareham, Dorset where his wife Doris, died in 1973. Greenwood died on 3 July 1975 at Wareham, Dorset, aged 84.

Sporting positions
Preceded by Ronald Poulton	English National Rugby Union Captain; 1920	Succeeded by Dave Davies
Preceded by J Milnes	Rugby Football Union President; 1935-37	Succeeded by B A Hill
