= Nick Easter =

England international rugby union player

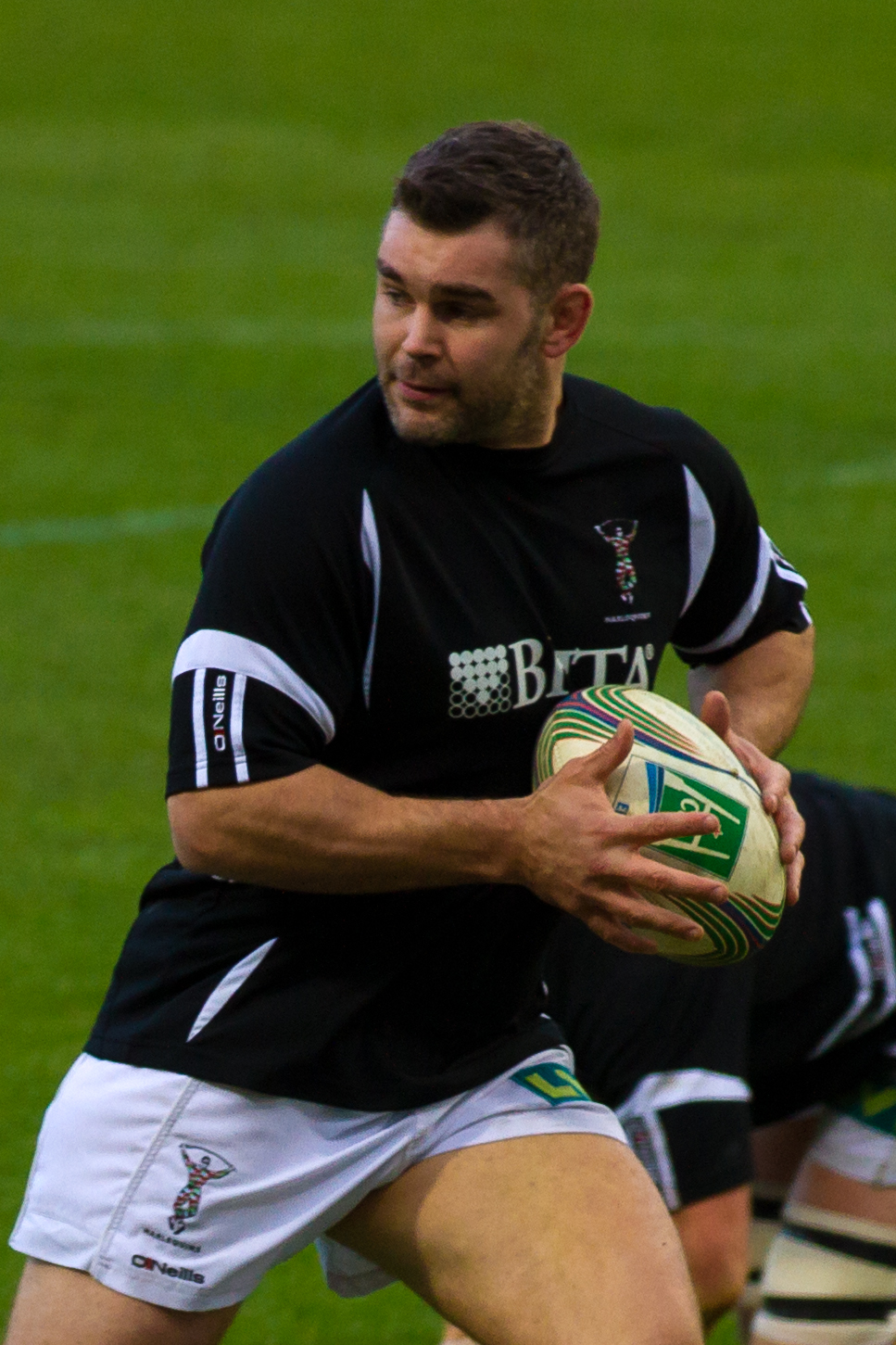
- Born: Nicholas James Easter; 15 August 1978 (age 48) Epsom, Surrey, England
- Height: 1.93 m (6 ft 4 in)
- Weight: 115 kg (18 st 2 lb; 254 lb)

Rugby union career
- Position(s): Number 8, Second Row
Youth career
- Old Alleynian
- Villagers Club
Senior career
| Years | Team | Apps | (Points) |
| 2001–2004 | Orrell | 75 | (150) |
| 2004–2016 | Harlequins | 281 | (265) |
International career
| Years | Team | Apps | (Points) |
| 2007–2016 | England | 54 | (45) |
- Correct as of 10 October 2015
Coaching career
- Years: Team
- 2016-2018: Harlequins (Defence Coach)
- 2018-2019: Natal Sharks South Africa (Forwards & Defence Coach)
- 2020-2022: Newcastle Falcons (Defence & Breakdown Coach)
- 2022: Worcester Warriors (Forwards & Defence Coach)
- 2022-: Chinnor RFC (Director of Rugby)
- 2023-: USA (Forwards & Defence Coach)

Nicholas James Easter (born 15 August 1978) is an English rugby union coach and former player. He played as a Number 8 for Orrell, Harlequins and the England national team.

He began his career in 2001, playing for Orrell, before moving to Harlequins three years later. He began playing for the England national team in 2007, playing in the 2007, 2011 and 2015 Rugby World Cups, as well as the annual Six Nations Championships. Aged 38, he retired in 2016.

== Early life ==
Easter is the elder brother of Sale Sharks player Mark Easter and the nephew of author Anne Easter Smith. His father, John, played squash professionally and reached No. 1 in Britain and No. 9 in the world. His great grandfather, Pieter Le Roux, played for the Springboks. He attended the South London public school Dulwich College and Nottingham Trent University.

== Club career ==
After a period working in London, Easter moved to Rosslyn Park F.C. before moving onto Orrell. In 2004, Easter signed for Harlequins.

Easter has won the Harlequins Player of the year award four times in 2004–05, 2005–06, 2012–13 and 2014–15 season at the age of 36. He was voted Aviva Premiership forward of the year in 2013 & 2014.

In the penultimate game of the 2013–14 season, against Bath, Nick became the most capped Harlequin in the professional era with 233 appearances.

During this period he won the 2012 Premiership, 2011 Amlin Cup and 2013 LV Cup. His final game was the European Challenge Cup final loss to Montpellier in May 2016.

=== Retirement ===
After 15 seasons, 54 international appearances and a record 281 appearances for Harlequins, Easter announced his retirement on 29 July 2016.

== International career ==
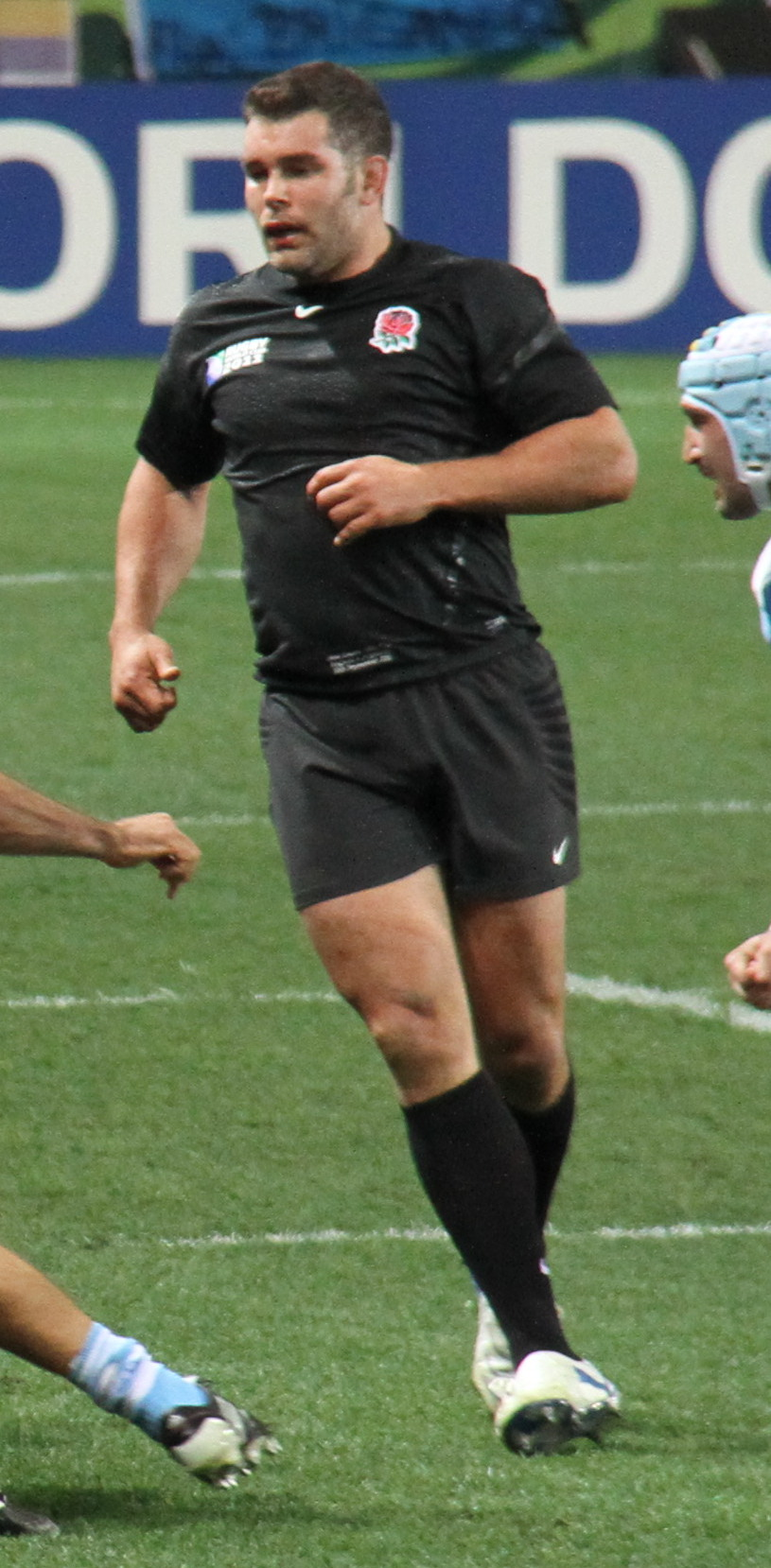
Easter playing for England in the 2011 World Cup

A skilful and powerful No 8, Easter a late comer to professional rugby made his England debut in their Six Nations victory over Italy on 10 February 2007. On 4 August 2007, Easter scored four tries as England defeated Wales by a record 62–5 at Twickenham Stadium, in a World Cup warm-up fixture, which made Easter the first ever number 8 to score four tries for England. He started six matches of the 2007 Rugby World Cup, where he was a key influence in England's route to the final, where they suffered a 6–15 defeat to South Africa in the final.

During the 2008 Six Nations, he was named man of the match in England's 24–13 success over France. In their following campaign, Easter started in all five of England's matches. During England's tour to Australia in 2010, he was named man of the match in their second test victory, 21–20 over Australia, helping secure England's first win over The Wallabies since their World Cup success on Australian soil in 2003. Later that year, he captained his country during the autumn internationals, where they defeated Samoa 26–13.

Easter was part of the England squad that won the 2011 Six Nations, despite defeat to Ireland 24–8, which resulted in them missing out on the grand slam. He lifted the Six Nations trophy as England captain, their first trophy win since the 2003 World Cup. He was also part of England's squad in the World Cup, and was reported to be the player to have reacted to England's quarter-final defeat to France in Auckland, by saying "There's £35k just gone down the toilet."

Between 2012 and 2014 he found his road into the England squad blocked, before being recalled to the squad for their 2015 Six Nations campaign. In their opening game, he came on as a substitute in their 21–16 success over Wales at the Millennium Stadium. In their following fixture, he scored a try against Italy, becoming the oldest player ever to score for England, before winning his fiftieth cap away to Ireland.

After being overlooked for the initial 31-man England squad for the 2015 Rugby World Cup, Easter was called up as injury replacement for Billy Vunipola. He put in a man of the match performance in England's final fixture against Uruguay, scoring a hat trick of tries.

=== International Tries ===
| Try | Opposing team | Location | Venue | Competition | Date | Result | Score |
|---|---|---|---|---|---|---|---|
| 1 | Wales | London, England | Twickenham Stadium | 2007 Rugby World Cup Warm-Up | 4 August 2007 | Win | 62 – 5 |
| 2 | Wales | London, England | Twickenham Stadium | 2007 Rugby World Cup Warm-Up | 4 August 2007 | Win | 62 – 5 |
| 3 | Wales | London, England | Twickenham Stadium | 2007 Rugby World Cup Warm-Up | 4 August 2007 | Win | 62 – 5 |
| 4 | Wales | London, England | Twickenham Stadium | 2007 Rugby World Cup Warm-Up | 4 August 2007 | Win | 62 – 5 |
| 5 | Australia | London, England | Twickenham Stadium | 2008 end-of-year rugby union internationals | 15 November 2008 | Loss | 14 – 28 |
| 6 | Italy | London, England | Twickenham Stadium | 2015 Six Nations Championship | 14 February 2015 | Win | 47 – 17 |
| 7 | Uruguay | Manchester, England | City of Manchester Stadium | 2015 Rugby World Cup | 10 October 2015 | Win | 60 – 3 |
| 8 | Uruguay | Manchester, England | City of Manchester Stadium | 2015 Rugby World Cup | 10 October 2015 | Win | 60 – 3 |
| 9 | Uruguay | Manchester, England | City of Manchester Stadium | 2015 Rugby World Cup | 10 October 2015 | Win | 60 – 3 |

== Coaching career ==
In 2016, immediately after confirming his retirement as a player, Easter became Harlequins' defence coach. He left his position in July 2018, following a change of management, ending his fourteen-year association with the club. He then joined the Natal Sharks in South Africa as forwards and attack coach for the Currie Cup campaign in 2018 which they won beating Western Province in the final 17–12. He re-signed with the Sharks for Super Rugby & Currie Cup 2019 as forwards and defence coach.

After his stint overseas Nick returned to England and signed for Premiership club Newcastle Falcons as defence and breakdown coach in 2020. He left in 2022 for rival Premiership club Worcester Warriors as forwards and defence coach under new Director of Rugby Steve Diamond, sadly the club went into administration soon after joining.

Nick soon joined up with Chinnor RFC in National League One as Director or Rugby in December 2022, the club were 2 wins from 11 and second from bottom but Easter steered them to 8th place with 11 wins from the remaining 15 games well clear of the drop zone. The following season Chinnor RFC won the league and got promoted to the RFU Championship for the first time in their history beating Birmingham Moseley away 52-0 with a game to spare. Since July 2023 Easter has also been coaching the USA Eagles as forwards and defence coach.

== Outside rugby ==
Easter has appeared in three episodes of BBC One programme A Question of Sport between 2008 and 2010. In 2016, he appeared in an episode of Pointless Celebrities, partnered with former rugby union and rugby league footballer; Martin Offiah.

In 2020 he launched a podcast with World Cup winner Kyran Bracken called Ruck It!
