= Ian Coutts (sportsman) =

Scotland international rugby union player & cricketer

- Born: Ian Douglas Freeman Coutts; 27 April 1928 Herne Hill
- Died: 3 May 1997 (aged 69) Kettering, Northamptonshire, England
- School: Dulwich College
- University: University of Oxford

Rugby union career
- Position: Centre
Senior career
Years	Team	Apps	(Points)
- Northampton
- Old Alleynians
- Oxford University RFC
- East Midlands RFC
International career
Years	Team	Apps	(Points)
1951-1952	Scotland	2	

Ian Douglas Freeman Coutts (27 April 1928 – 3 May 1997) was a Scottish sportsman from England who played cricket at first-class level and who represented Scotland in rugby union from 1951 to 1952.

== Early life ==
Ian Coutts was born on 27 April 1928 in Herne Hill, south London and attended Dulwich College. He played both rugby and cricket for the school's first teams. He went up to Lincoln College, Oxford, after a break due to National Service. Coutts was selected for the 1950 Oxford University A side and in 1951 and 1952 won blues for cricket. He also won a rugby blue.

== Rugby union career ==
After university Coutts played his club rugby for Northampton and was also a regular in his schools old boys side, the Old Alleynians. He made his international debut for Scotland whilst still at Oxford, on 13 January 1951 at Colombes against France. Scotland lost this game, and Coutts was also on the losing side when he won his second cap on 15 March 1952, this time against England.

== Cricket ==
Coutts played first-class cricket for Oxford University, as a right-arm medium-fast bowler. From 15 matches, he took 33 wickets at an average of 35.75. He later played minor cricket for a number of sides, including the Harlequins cricket team and the Free Foresters in 1953, the Cryptics and the Old Alleynians.
