= Arthur Skey =

English cricketer and Royal Navy officer

Surgeon Rear-Admiral Arthur Skey
- Born: 13 February 1873; Lucknow, North-Western Provinces, British India
- Died: 13 July 1942 (aged 69); Gosport, Hampshire, England
- Cricket career

Cricket information
- Batting: Right-handed
- Bowling: Slow left-arm orthodox

Career statistics
Competition	First-class
Matches	1
Runs scored	4
Batting average	4.00
100s/50s	–/–
Top score	4
Balls bowled	234
Wickets	6
Bowling average	19.50
5 wickets in innings	1
10 wickets in match	–
Best bowling	5/27
Catches/stumpings	–/–
- Source: Cricinfo, 21 June 2019

Arthur Richard Harrie Skey (13 February 1873 – 13 July 1942) was Royal Navy officer and English first-class cricketer. Skey served as a surgeon in the Royal Navy from 1896, rising to the rank of surgeon rear-admiral. He also played first-class cricket for the Royal Navy.

== Life and naval career ==
Skey was born at Lucknow in British India, before being educated in England at Dulwich College. From there he trained to be a surgeon at St Bartholomew's Hospital. After qualifying he joined the Royal Navy, where he was appointed as a surgeon in November 1896. He was promoted to the rank of staff surgeon in November 1904. Skey appeared in a single first-class cricket match for the Royal Navy against the British Army cricket team at Lord's in 1912. In the Army's first-innings, he took figures of 5 for 27, while in their second-innings he took figures of 1 for 90. Batting twice in the match, he was dismissed for 4 runs in the Royal Navy's first-innings by Francis Wyatt, while in their second-innings he was unbeaten without scoring.

He served in the navy during the First World War, where he was mentioned in dispatches for actions during the Battle of Jutland. He was awarded the Order of Saints Maurice and Lazarus by Italy in August 1917. By July 1927, he held the rank of surgeon captain. It was in July 1927 that he was promoted to the rank of surgeon rear-admiral. He died at Royal Hospital Haslar at Gosport in July 1942.
