= Kendrick Stark =

England international rugby union player

- Born: Kendrick James Stark; 18 August 1904 Edmonton, London
- Died: 27 March 1988 (aged 83) (registered in) Horsham
- School: Dulwich College

Rugby union career
- Position: Prop
International career
Years	Team	Apps	(Points)
1927–1928	England	9	(Pts:5; Tries:0; Conv:1; Pens:1; Drop:0)

Kendrick Stark (1904–1988) was a rugby union international who represented England from 1927 to 1928.

== Early life ==
Kendrick Stark was born on 18 August 1904 in Edmonton.

== Rugby football ==
Stark made his international debut on 15 January 1927 at Twickenham in the England vs Wales match. Of the 9 matches he played for his national side he was on the winning side on 7 occasions. He played his final match for England on 17 March 1928 at Twickenham in the England vs Scotland match.
