= William David Doherty =

Ireland international rugby union footballer

W. D. Doherty
- Born: William David Doherty; 17 July 1893 Wandsworth, England
- Died: 31 March 1966 (aged 72)
- School: Dulwich College
- University: Cambridge University
- Occupation: Surgeon

Rugby union career
- Position: Lock
Senior career
Years	Team	Apps	(Points)
1913	Cambridge University		
1919–1922	Guy's Hospital RC		
1921	United Hospitals		
–	Surrey		
International career
Years	Team	Apps	(Points)
1920–1921	Ireland	7	

William David Doherty, M.A., M.Ch., F.R.C.S., known as George Doherty, was a medical superintendent of Guy's Hospital, London, and a former captain of the Ireland national rugby union team.

== Early life ==
William David Doherty was born on 17 July 1893, in south London. He attended Dulwich College where he played rugby and for three years represented his school at the Public Schools boxing championships. He proceeded to King's College, Cambridge, to study medicine. Having broken his education to serve in the First World War, he graduated B.A. in 1917. He immediately entered Guy's Hospital Medical School, qualifying with the Conjoint diploma in 1920.

== Military service ==
At the outbreak of the First World War, Doherty interrupted his medical studies at Cambridge to volunteer for active service. He served in France with the Royal Army Service Corps (R.A.S.C.), attaining the rank of captain. Owing to a shortage of qualified doctors, he was later recalled to Britain to resume his medical training.

== Rugby career ==
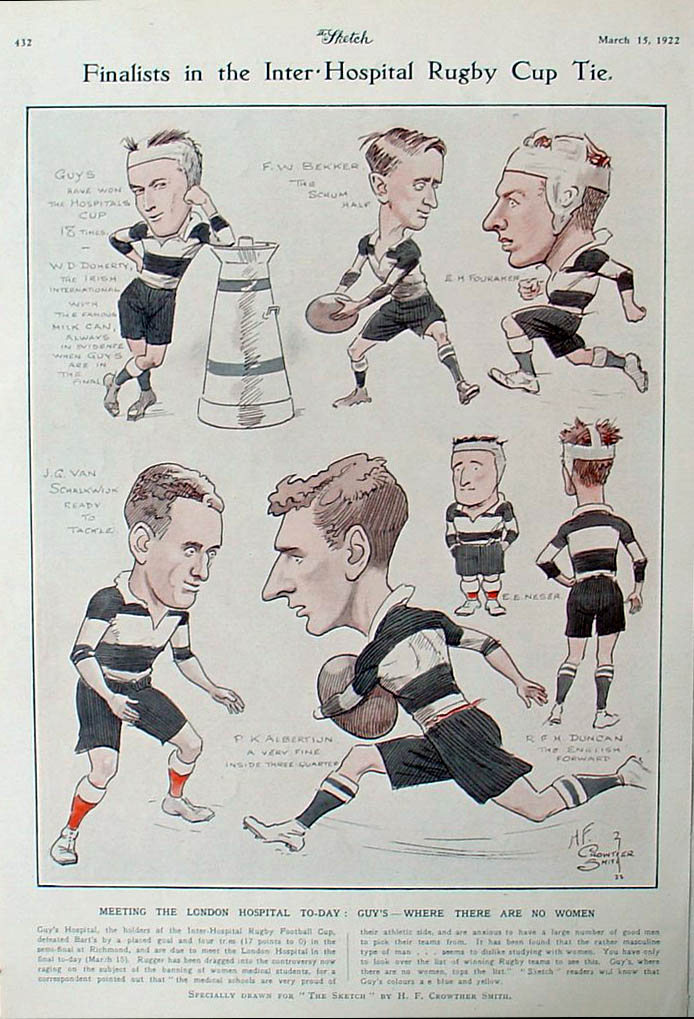
Caricature from The Sketch magazine in 1922. Doherty in top left.

By the time George Doherty entered Guy's his reputation as a rugby forward was already well established. Whilst at Dulwich College he played in an unbeaten first XV in 1909 which contained five future internationals dubbed the 'Famous Five'. These five would all go on to play in the 1913 Varsity Match, (and also produced the captains of both Oxford and Cambridge in 1919), and all served in the First World War. They were Eric Loudoun-Shand and Grahame Donald who both went on to play for Scotland, Doherty himself who went on to play for and captain Ireland, Jenny Greenwood who went on to play for and captain England and the record-breaking Cyril Lowe.

From Dulwich College, Doherty went to Cambridge University. He was selected for the 1913 varsity match. On his team were two of his former school teammates, CN Lowe and JE Greenwood, on the opposing side were Eric Loudoun-Shand and Graham Donald also from Dulwich. After the First World War, Doherty was selected to play for Ireland. In addition, at Cambridge he was also awarded a half-Blue for water polo.

Guy's benefited from having Doherty in their side, but he was not the lone international playing for the side. The Guy's side that he captained for three years, played in the post-war years in which Guy's was regarded as the amongst the finest, if not the finest, club side in the country. It also included many famous players from South Africa (at one point there were 14 South Africans and himself.) and Wales. Doherty's former school friend and fellow international, Eric Loudoun-Shand, said that Doherty was "the lightest and toughest forward, a player who was always on the ball, and a magnificent leader." This view was born out by the fact whilst captain of Guy's Doherty was also capped seven times for Ireland and captained them in 1921. In 1921 he was also the captain of the United Hospitals RFC. In one season, he captained Ireland, United Hospitals, Surrey and Guy's.

After his playing days were over, Doherty maintained a strong relationship with Guy's Hospital Rugby and served as President from 1943 to 1951.

== Medical career ==
After qualifying, Doherty pursued a distinguished medical career at Guy's Hospital. He took the degree of M.A. and passed the Fellowship of the Royal College of Surgeons (F.R.C.S.) in 1923, followed by the Cambridge M.Ch. in 1925. His early appointments included those of assistant house-surgeon to E. C. Hughes and house-surgeon to Sir Alfred Fripp, after which he served as a demonstrator in anatomy.

From 1923 to 1931 he was surgical registrar and tutor at Guy's Hospital, a formative period during which he gained a reputation as an able clinical teacher, noted for emphasising careful history-taking and physical examination. In 1931 he was appointed assistant surgeon. Although initially practising general surgery, he later specialised in genito-urinary surgery.

In 1936 Doherty succeeded A. R. Thompson as genito-urinary surgeon at Guy's Hospital, taking charge of a department established in 1916. He developed the specialty into a flourishing service with the cooperation of his colleagues, work which continued until the Second World War, when in-patient services were transferred to Orpington Hospital. During the war he remained closely involved with hospital life, frequently sleeping at Guy's while helping to organise emergency surgical services during air raids. He also served as sub-dean of the medical school during this period.

In 1948 Doherty was appointed Medical Superintendent of Guy's Hospital. In this role he was heavily involved in the post-war repair and redevelopment of the hospital, including the salvage of bomb-damaged wards and the expansion and re-equipment of departments such as radiology and radiotherapy. He also played a significant role in planning the hospital's future under the National Health Service, including the development of the New Surgical Block, completed shortly after his retirement in 1958.

Following his retirement, Doherty continued to serve Guy's Hospital as a governor, an appointment he received in 1961. He also served as chairman of the Nursing and Nurses' Education Committee, and was a governor of Guy's Hospital Medical School and of Alleyn's College of God's Gift. In total, he was actively associated with Guy's Hospital for 49 years.

== Personal and later life ==
In 1922 George Doherty married Annie Ruth Margaret Barber and they had two sons and a daughter. He was also a member of a number of medical dining clubs, one of which, the Cambridge Medical Graduates Club, he was president. After his retirement he was also an active mason and regularly visited South Africa.

He died suddenly on 31 March 1966 a week after an operation on his hip.

Sporting positions
Preceded by Dickie Lloyd; Dickie Lloyd	Ireland Rugby Union Captain; Feb 1920; 1921	Succeeded by Thomas Wallace; William Collopy
