= Bernard Charles Hartley =

England international rugby union player

Jock Hartley
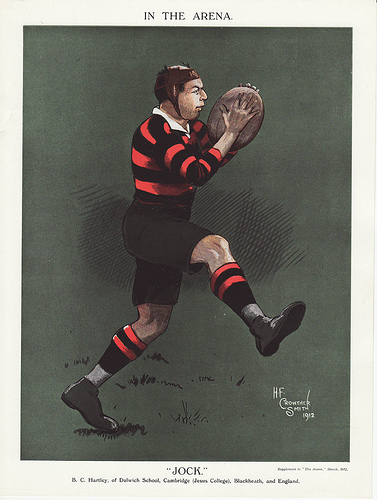
- Born: Bernard Charles Hartley; 16 March 1879 Woodford, London
- Died: 24 April 1960 (aged 81) Chichester
- School: Dulwich College
- University: Jesus College, Cambridge

Rugby union career
- Position: Forward
Senior career
Years	Team	Apps	(Points)
- Cambridge University R.U.F.C.
–	Blackheath F.C.		
–	Barbarian F.C.		
–	Kent		
International career
Years	Team	Apps	(Points)
1901–1902	England	2	(0)

Major Bernard Charles "Jock" Hartley OBE (16 March 1879 – 24 April 1960) was a rugby union international player who represented England from 1901 to 1902. At club level he represented Cambridge University and Blackheath. In 1938 he was given the role of team manager of the British Isles team on their tour of South Africa.

== Life history ==
Hartley was born on 16 March 1879 in Woodford, London to Charles Rowley Hartley. He attended Dulwich College, matriculating to Jesus College, Cambridge in 1897. At Cambridge he won three sporting "Blues" as a student, one in rugby and two in athletics for the hammer. He served in the British Army during World War I, as a lieutenant in the Hertfordshire Regiment. Wounded in action, Hartley was employed by the War Office and rose to the rank of Major. In 1927 he was awarded the Civil Division of the Order of the British Empire and in 1947 he was awarded the Military Division of the same award.

== Rugby union career ==
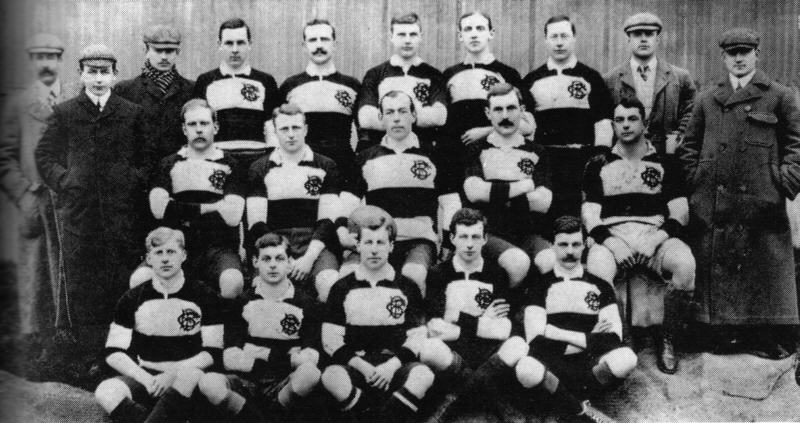
Bernard Hartley captaining the 1904 Barbarians, seated centre of middle row

Hartley first came to note as a rugby player when he represented Cambridge University. He played in one Varsity Match in 1900, winning a sporting "Blue". By the time Hartley made his international debut on 9 March 1901, he was representing Blackheath, despite still being at Cambridge. His first cap for England was at Blackheath in the 1901 Home Nations Championship encounter with Scotland. England lost the match 18–3, but Hartley finished his international career with a win when he played his second and final match for England on 15 March 1902 at Inverleith, a victory over Scotland.

Although his international career was behind him, Hartley has a long relationship with the game of rugby throughout his life. In 1900 he was offered a place in the invitational touring team, Barbarian F.C., scoring the only Barbarian try in their 3–9 loss to Newport in the 1901 Easter tour. In the 1903-1904 Barbarian tours he was made team captain and would later become Honorary Secretary of the club.

In 1907 he became Cambridge University RUFC's representative on the Rugby Football Union, and in 1923-24 he was on the committee of National Selectors for the England national team. In 1938, Hartley was given the role of manager of the British Isles team on their 1938 tour of South Africa, the tourist lost the series 2–1.

== Bibliography ==
- Starmer-Smith, Nigel (1977). The Barbarians. Macdonald & Jane's Publishers. ISBN 0-86007-552-4.
