= Cyril Wells =

English rugby union footballer, cricketer, and schoolmaster

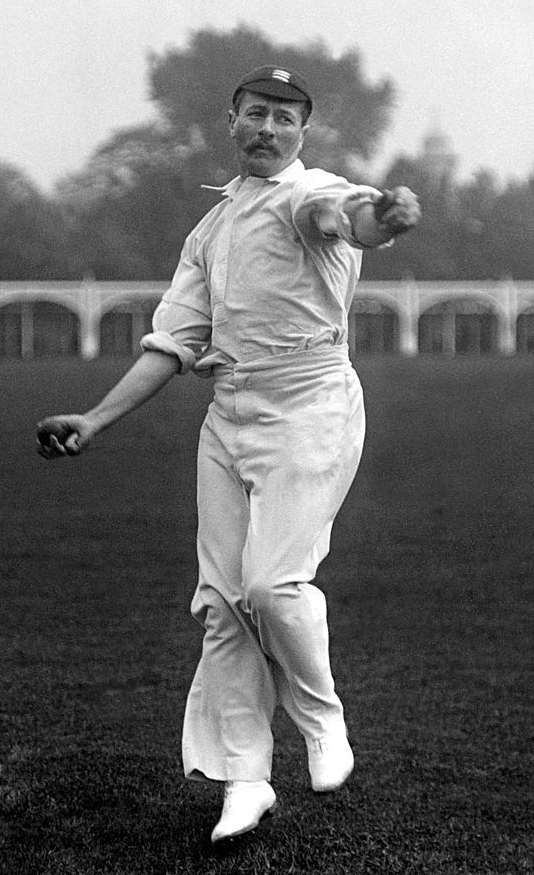
- Wells in about 1905

Personal information
- Born: 21 March 1871; St Pancras, London
- Died: 22 August 1963 (aged 92); St John's Wood, London

Domestic team information
- Years: Team
- 1891–1893: Cambridge University
- 1892–1893: Surrey
- 1895–1909: Middlesex

Career statistics
Competition	First-class
Matches	143
Runs scored	4,229
Batting average	22.02
100s/50s	4/17
Top score	244
Balls bowled	9,235
Wickets	465
Bowling average	19.86
5 wickets in innings	27
10 wickets in match	3
Best bowling	8/35
Catches/stumpings	122/–
- Source: Cricinfo, 16 April 2019

Cyril Mowbray Wells (21 March 1871 – 22 August 1963) was an English cricketer, rugby footballer and schoolmaster.

Educated at Dulwich College and Trinity College, Cambridge, Wells played first-class cricket for Cambridge University, Surrey and Middlesex and was a top class rugby player. He was also a housemaster and cricket coach at Eton College, becoming the first Honorary Member of the Eton Ramblers Cricket Club.

Wells was a notable rugby player. He played for Cambridge University R.U.F.C. in the Varsity Match in 1891 and 1892, and in six matches for the England national rugby union team from 1893 to 1897. His also played at club level for Harlequins and county level for Middlesex.
