= David Flatman =

England international rugby union player

- Born: David Luke Flatman; 21 January 1980 (age 46) Ashford, Kent, England
- Height: 1.83 m (6 ft 0 in)
- Weight: 120 kg (18 st 13 lb)
- School: Maidstone Grammar School; Dulwich College; The Maplesden Noakes School

Rugby union career
- Position: Prop
Senior career
Years	Team	Apps	(Points)
1998–2003	Saracens	109	(25)
2003–2012	Bath	156	(5)
International career
Years	Team	Apps	(Points)
2000–2002	England	8	(0)

David Luke Flatman (born 21 January 1980) is an English sports pundit and former rugby union player who played prop. Flatman represented England eight times between 2000 and 2002, playing club rugby for Saracens and Bath. Flatman is routinely referred to by his nickname Flats.

== Career ==
=== Early life ===
Born in Maidstone he started playing rugby union at the age of eight at his local club, Maidstone FC, inspired by his father, who was a prop. A product of Maidstone Grammar School, he then transferred to Dulwich College, subsequently appearing in the same England Schools (18-group) squad as Steve Borthwick, Andrew Sheridan (also of Dulwich College), Alex Sanderson, Mike Tindall and Jonny Wilkinson.

Flatman toured Australia with England Schools in 1997 and the following year went to Argentina with England Colts. He represented London & South-West and England Under-21s against South Africa in the autumn of 1998.

=== Senior career ===
His senior club rugby began with Saracens in 1998. He won his first cap for England as a replacement against South Africa on 17 June 2000, England lost 18–13; he also appeared in the tour matches against North-West Leopards and Gauteng Falcons.

He made a second tour with the England side to North America in the summer of 2001, appearing as a replacement for Graham Rowntree in the Burnaby and San Francisco Tests against Canada and the United States respectively. He was a regular in the England A side since making his debut against France in Blagnac in 2000. He had a sequence of seven England A team games before being recalled to the senior squad for the final test of the 2000–1 season against France at Twickenham.

He moved to Bath in 2003.

Flatman announced his retirement from rugby in June 2012. In all he won eight England Caps

== Media career ==
Following the end of his playing career, he was Head of Communications at Bath Rugby for two years; he left this role in 2014.

Since 2016, Flatman has co-presented the humorous and informative podcast Flats and Shanks with his former Saracens flatmate, Tom Shanklin.

Flatman now works as a pundit for ITV, BT Sport and Amazon Prime often alongside Laurence Dallaglio, Austin Healey, Ben Kay and Chris Ashton. In 2016 the Daily Telegraph named him as the fifth best sports pundit on British TV.
