= Bill Mitchell (cricketer) =

English cricketer

Personal information
- Full name: William MacFarlane Mitchell
- Born: 15 August 1929; Lewisham, Kent, England
- Died: 6 November 2005 (aged 76); Westminster, London, England
- Batting: Right-handed
- Bowling: Leg break googly

Domestic team information
- Years: Team
- 1951–1953: Oxford University

Career statistics
Competition	First-class
Matches	26
Runs scored	480
Batting average	15.00
100s/50s	–/–
Top score	48
Balls bowled	3,285
Wickets	36
Bowling average	55.50
5 wickets in innings	1
10 wickets in match	–
Best bowling	5/107
Catches/stumpings	12/–
- Source: Cricinfo, 16 June 2020

William 'Bill' MacFarlane Mitchell (15 August 1929 – 6 November 2005) was an English first-class cricketer.

== Life ==
Mitchell was born at Lewisham in August 1929. He was educated at Dulwich College, before going up to Merton College, Oxford. While studying at Oxford, Mitchell played first-class cricket for Oxford University. He made his debut against Middlesex in 1951, taking what was to be his only career five wicket haul when he took 5 for 107. He made ten appearances in his debut season, including an appearance in The University Match against Cambridge University. He featured in a further ten matches in 1952, though struggled to take wickets with his leg break googly bowling. The emergence of younger spinners and the pressure of his examinations limited him to six appearances in 1953. His 26 first-class matches yielded him 36 wickets at an average of 55.50. As a middle order batsman, he scored 480 runs with a high score of 45.

Mitchell died on 6 November 2005 after collapsing while acting as an usher at the memorial service to Edward Heath at Westminster Abbey.
