= Eric Whiteley =

England international rugby union player

- Born: Eric Cyprian Perry Whiteley; 20 July 1904 Croydon, London
- Died: 16 March 1973 (aged 68) (registered in) Surrey
- School: Dulwich College

Rugby union career
- Position: Fullback
International career
Years	Team	Apps	(Points)
1931–1931	England	2	(Pts:0; Tries:0; Conv:0; Pens:0; Drop:0)

Eric Whiteley was a rugby union international who represented England in 1931.

== Early life ==
Whiteley was born on 20 July 1904, in Croydon.

== Rugby union career ==
Whiteley made his international debut on 21 March 1931 at Murrayfield in the Scotland vs England match. Of the two matches he played for his national side, he was on the winning side on neither occasion. He played his final match for England on 6 April 1931 at Colombes in the France vs England match.
