= C. H. Scott =

American politician

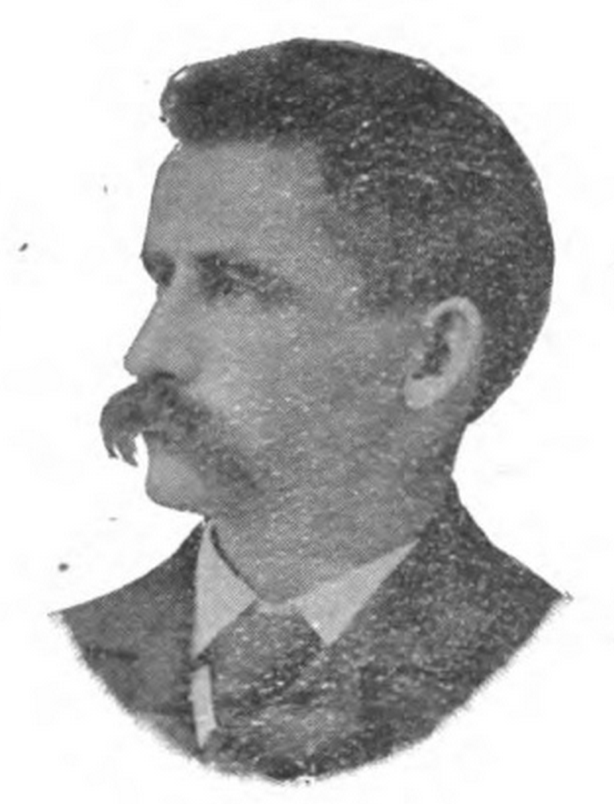
- Scott in 1895

Member of the Washington House of Representatives for the 30th district
- In office 1893–1897

Personal details
- Born: October 18, 1860 Arrow Rock, Missouri, United States
- Party: Populist

Charles H. Scott (October 18, 1860 – ?) was an American politician in the state of Washington. He served in the Washington House of Representatives.
