= Albert Luvian Wade =

Scotland international rugby union player

Albert Wade
- Born: Albert Luvian Wade; 20 September 1884 Glasgow, Scotland
- Died: 28 April 1917 (aged 32) Oppy Wood, Arras, France
- School: Dulwich College

Rugby union career
- Position: Scrum-half
Senior career
Years	Team	Apps	(Points)
- London Scottish F.C.
–	Barbarian F.C.		
International career
Years	Team	Apps	(Points)
1908	Scotland	1	(0)

Lt. Albert Luvian Wade (20 September 1884 – 28 April 1917) was a Scottish rugby union player. He was killed in World War I.

== Early life ==
Wade, known as Bertie, was born in Glasgow. He attended Dulwich College, where he captained the First XV.

== Rugby union career ==
He played for London Scottish FC and was capped for Scotland on 21 March 1908, at Inverleith in the Scotland vs England match which was won by Scotland.

== Military service ==
Wade was killed at Oppy Wood, near Arras on 28 April 1917, whilst serving as a Lieutenant in 17th Battalion, The Middlesex Regiment, on temporary attachment to a trench mortar battery. He was 32 years of age and has no known grave, being commemorated on the Arras Memorial.
