= Mark Easter =

Rugby player from Swaziland (born 1982)

- Born: October 19, 1982 (age 44) Mbabane, Swaziland
- Height: 1.88 m (6 ft 2 in)
- Weight: 104 kg (16 st 5 lb)
- School: Dulwich College

Rugby union career
- Position: Flanker
- Current team: Sale Sharks
Senior career
Years	Team	Apps	(Points)
–2005	Nottingham		
2005–2011	Northampton	60	(15)
2011–	Sale Sharks	80	(30)
- Correct as of 29 August 2015

Mark Easter (born 19 October 1982 in Mbabane, Swaziland) is a retired rugby union footballer who played at No. 8 or Flanker for Sale Sharks and Northampton Saints. He is the younger brother of former Harlequins and England player Nick Easter.

Mark is a former pupil of Dulwich College and a member of the winning Old Alleynian 2003 team.

On 8 March 2011, Sale Sharks announced that he had signed a two-year contract to play for them from the 2011–12 season.
