= Carlos Mold =

Argentine rugby union footballer and cricketer

- Born: Charles Trevor Mold
- School: Dulwich College

Rugby union career
- Position: Fly-half
Senior career
Years	Team	Apps	(Points)
- Buenos Aires Cricket & Rugby Club
International career
Years	Team	Apps	(Points)
1910	Argentina	1	(Pts:0; Tries:0; Conv:0; Pens:0; Drop:0)

Carlos Mold was a rugby union international and cricket international who represented Argentina's rugby side in 1910 and the Argentina cricket team from 1920 to 1922.

== Early life ==
Charles Trevor Mold was born on 20 July 1885 in Argentina. His father, Charles Mold, was a broker who had emigrated to Argentina from England with his wife Elizabeth. Charles had a younger sister, Alice. He attended Dulwich College in England and there excelled at sport playing in the school cricket (1901–1902) and rugby sides.

== Rugby union career ==
Mold played his club rugby for Buenos Aires Cricket & Rugby Club and was selected to play the touring Combined British in their 1910 tour of Argentina. This was Argentina's first recognised test and although they lost to the tourists it was a great boon to rugby in the country.

== Military ==
During World War I, Mold was enrolled in the Inns of Court OTC, registration 14279 His occupation at this time was a rancher.

== Cricket ==
As a cricketer he played for his school side, which in itself was a distinction given Dulwich College's reputation for cricket at the turn of the twentieth century. He played a number of matches for the South of Argentina vs the North of Argentina, from 21 February 1909 to 2 March 1924 and after the First World War also played in international matches for Argentina against both Chile and Brazil, opening the batting on more than one occasion.
