= George Isherwood =

British Lions international rugby union player

G. A. M. Isherwood
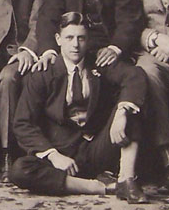
- Born: George Aldwyn Methuen Isherwood; 3 February 1889 Barton upon Irwell, Lancashire, England
- Died: 1 February 1974 (aged 84) St Albans district
- School: Ramsey Grammar School; Dulwich College

Rugby union career
- Position: scrum-half
Amateur team(s)
Years	Team	Apps	(Points)
c.1909	Sale		
1909	Cheshire RFC		
International career
Years	Team	Apps	(Points)
1910	British Isles	3	(0)

George Aldwyn Methuen Isherwood (1889-1974) was a rugby union international who was part of the first official British and Irish Lions team that toured South Africa in 1910.

== Early life ==
George Aldwyn Methuen Isherwood was born on 3 February 1889 in Barton upon Irwell, Lancashire, England. He was the son of the stone and builder's merchant, Samuel G Isherwood and Annie Methuen (daughter of Scottish chemist Richard Methuen). He also had a younger sister Dorothy. For a time he lived on the Isle of Man whilst boarding at Ramsey Grammar School, but went on to attend Dulwich College in south London where he played both rugby and cricket for the school.

== Rugby career ==
Isherwood went on to play for Cheshire and played regularly for that county side in the 1909 season. Isherwood also played for Sale and was part of the 50th anniversary team that swept to an unprecedented season record of P 26, W 24, D 2. Although P.H. Davies is counted as Sale's first international (having been picked to play for England in 1927), it was Isherwood who was Sale's first representative in an international Test match, when he played in all three tests of the 1910 British tour to South Africa at scrum-half. Isherwood was selected for this first official tour (in that it was sanctioned and selected by the four Home Nations official governing bodies) and took part in twenty out of the twenty four matches played, including all three ‘Tests'. He was said to have played a useful and consistent game at half. Despite playing for the British team, he was never selected for England.

== First World War ==
Isherwood fought in the Royal Field Artillery in the first world war, rising to the rank of captain. Amongst the theatres of wars in which he served were Egypt, in September 1914 and in Gallipoli in May 1915.
