= Eric Loudoun-Shand =

Scotland international rugby union player

- Born: Eric Gordon Loudoun-Shand; 31 March 1893 Edinburgh, Scotland
- Died: August 1972 Oxford
- School: Dulwich College
- University: Oxford University

Rugby union career
- Position: Centre
Senior career
Years	Team	Apps	(Points)
1911–1919	Oxford University		
International career
Years	Team	Apps	(Points)
1913	Scotland	1	

Eric Gordon Loudoun-Shand MC TD (born Eric Gordon Shand; 31 March 1893) was a Rugby Union international who played for Scotland and captained Oxford University's Rugby side in the 1919 Varsity Match. During what would have been the prime of his playing career he fought in the First World War.

== Biography ==
Eric Gordon Shand was born on 31 March 1893 in Edinburgh, Scotland. He was one of the ten children of John Loudoun Shand and his wife Lucy, and was the youngest of the five brothers. His father, who originated from Scotland, adopted his middle name Loudoun as the first part of a double-barrelled surname, and all members of the family followed suit. His father, John Loudoun Loudoun-Shand (died 2 February 1932 at Craigellie, Alleyn Park, Dulwich. Aged 86 years) was a prominent plantation owner in what was then called Ceylon. Arriving in the Island in 1864 Mr. Loudoun-Shand did a lot of planting chiefly in the Dimbula and Dickoya districts and in 1879 and 1880 was elected Chairman of the Planters' Association of Ceylon in what was a difficult period. Known as "Silver-tongued Shand" due to his oratory prowess, in 1882 and 1884 he was Planting Member of the Legislative Council. He was also an Honorary Life Member of the Ceylon Association in London. His mother died in September 1930 in Ceylon. She had travelled there in 1872 to be married.

Along with his four brothers, Eric attended Dulwich College. His eldest brother, William, followed his father into the planting business. The second of the brothers Stewart was a recipient of the Victoria Cross. Alexander, the third brother, became a Commander in the Royal Australian Navy and was the head of the Royal Australian Naval College. The fifth of the five brothers was C. B. Loudoun-Shand who resided Delta, Pussellawa for a while. He was known as 'Bosun' Loudoun-Shand and was the Colonel of the volunteer force 'Ceylon Planters' Rifle Corps' .

== Rugby career ==
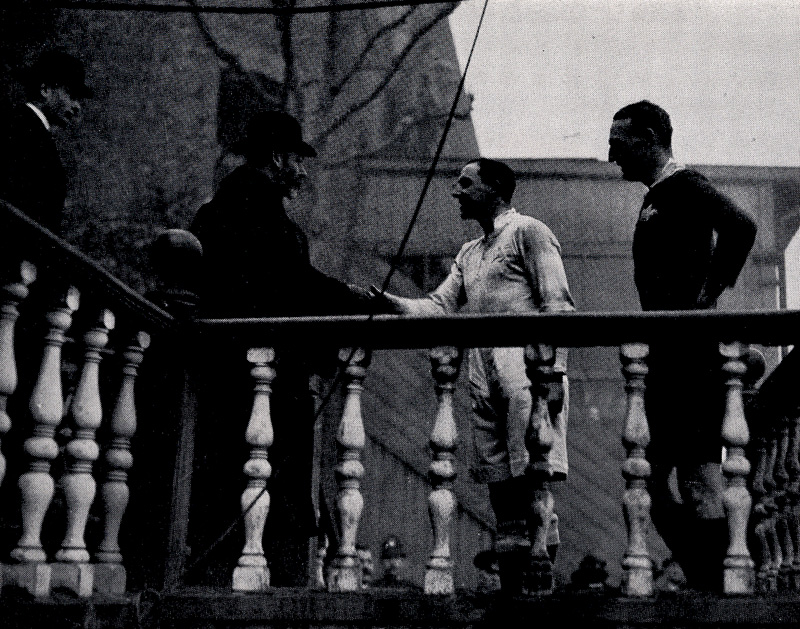
Loudoun-Shand (Oxford) and JE Greenwood (Cambridge) meeting King George V at the 1919 Varsity match

Eric learnt his rugby at Dulwich College. Whilst there he played in an unbeaten first XV in 1909 which contained five future internationals dubbed the 'Famous Five'. These five would all go on to play in the 1913 Varsity Match, (and also produced the captains of both Oxford and Cambridge in 1919), and all served in the First World War. They were Eric Loudoun-Shand himself and Grahame Donald who both went on to play for Scotland, William David Doherty who went on to play for and captain Ireland, Jenny Greenwood who went on to play for and captain England and the record-breaking Cyril Lowe.

From Dulwich College, Eric went to Oxford University. He was selected to play as a Centre in the 1913 varsity match against Cambridge University. In that same year he was selected to play for Scotland against England at Twickenham on 15 March. In that match, which Scotland lost by 3-point to nil due to LG Brown's try, he wore the number 4 shirt. On the opposing side were two of his former school teammates, CN Lowe and JE Greenwood. His international career was then interrupted by the outbreak of the First World War. He joined the King's Royal Rifle Corps and during the war rose to the rank of Major and received the Military Cross. He was also a holder of the Territorial Decoration.

He did not return to international rugby, but he did make a return for Oxford University in 1919. He captained the side and his opposing captain was his former school teammate J. E. Greenwood. It was due to a chance encounter with Eric Loudoun-Shand that Greenwood was allowed to captain the Cambridge side that year. It was within the prerogative of the Oxford captain to deny Cambridge the chance to field Greenwood, who had left the university just prior to the war. However, the long association proved to be to Greenwood's good fortune. Eric Loudoun-Shand played that match with a severely injured arm, an injury from the Great War. So bad was this injury that he later had to have the arm amputated.

== Personal life ==
In 1923 Eric married Dorothy Feldtmann with whom he had a son Keith born in 1927.
