= List of PSG College of Technology people =

PSG University Staff and Students

Coordinates: 11.0247°N 77.00298°E

This list of PSG College of Technology people is a selected list of notable past staff and students of the PSG College of Technology.

== Academics ==
- G. V. Loganathan, former professor, Virginia Tech
- A. G. Ramakrishnan, professor, Indian Institute of Science
- Ragunathan Rajkumar, George Westinghouse Professor, Carnegie Mellon University
- Siva Umapathy, Shanti Swarup Bhatnagar laureate
- Kalidhindi B. R. Varma, Vice-chancellor, Sri Sathya Sai Institute of Higher Learning
- Madhu Bhaskaran, engineer and Professor at RMIT University
- Navin Ramankutty, Professor of Global Food Security and Sustainability at the University of British Columbia

== Business ==
- Shiv Nadar, chairman and CSO of HCL Technologies
- C Vijayakumar, CEO, HCL Technologies
- Sundar Raman, CEO of Reliance Sports and cricket administrator
- Sundaram Karivardhan, industrialist and motorsport pioneer
- Lakshmi Narayanan, former Vice Chairman and CEO of Cognizant, and Chairman of ICT Academy
- Madhusudhan Rao Lagadapati, executive chairman of Lanco Infratech

== Government, Politics and Public Services ==
- K. Annamalai, ex-IPS officer and former President of BJP Tamil Nadu
- Y. S. Chowdary, former Minister of State for Science and Technology & Earth Sciences, Government of India
- Jose K. Mani, Member of Parliament in the Rajya Sabha
- Kishore Kumar Rajaram, President, Sivananda Saraswathi Sevashram
- K. Pandiarajan, businessman and politician from AIADMK
- Singai G. Ramachandran, former secretary of AIADMK (IT Wing)

== Arts and Entertainment ==
- Cottalango Leon, winner of an Academy Award
- Mahesh Muthuswami, cinematographer
- Aparna B Marar, classical dancer

== Scientists ==
- Mylswamy Annadurai, director of Chandrayaan-1 and Chandrayaan-2, ISRO
- R. M. Vasagam, space scientist and former Project Director, Ariane Passenger Payload Experiment
