= PSG College of Technology =

Engineering college in Coimbatore, India

Coordinates: 11.0247°N 77.00298°E

- பி எஸ் ஜி தொழில்நுட்பக் கல்லூரி
- Crest of PSG Tech
- Motto: Knowledge and Power
- Type: Government-aided, autonomous, private college
- Established: 1951; 75 years ago
- Affiliations: Anna University
- Principal: Dr. P. R. Thyla
- Undergraduates: 8518
- Postgraduates: 505
- Location: Coimbatore, Tamil Nadu, India
- Campus: 45 acres (18 ha); Urban
- Website: www.psgtech.edu

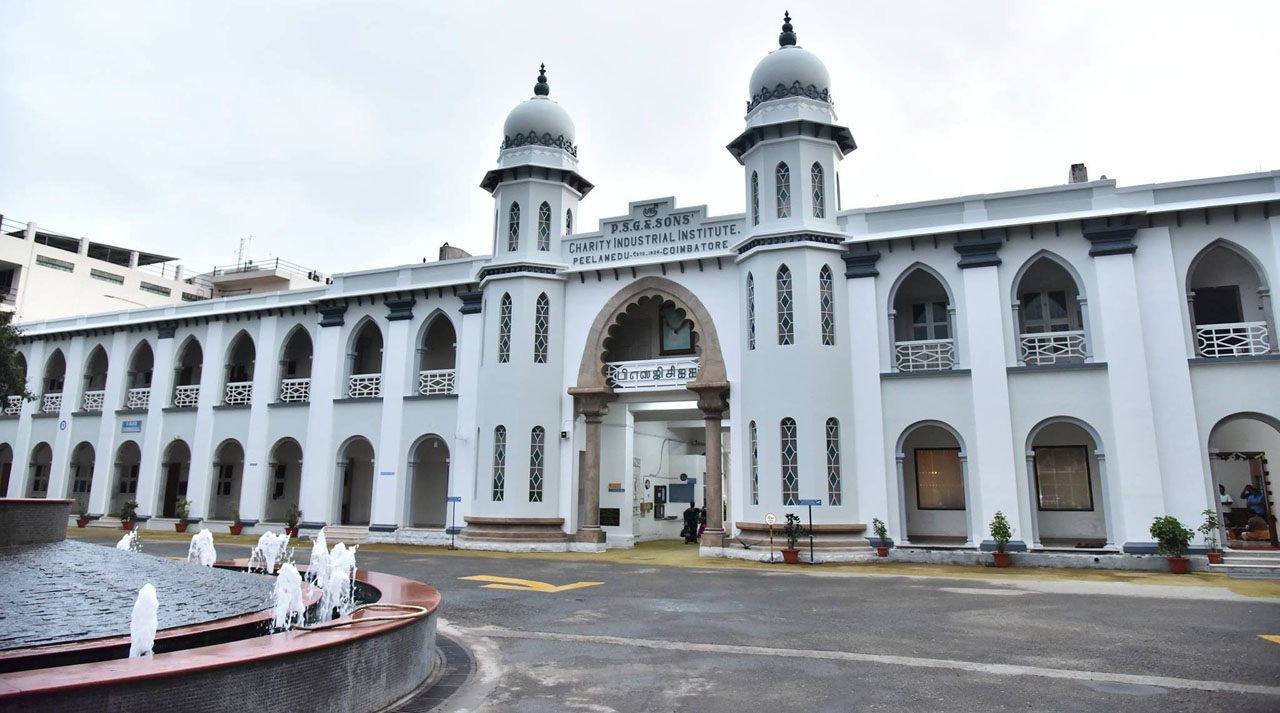
PSG Tech Front View

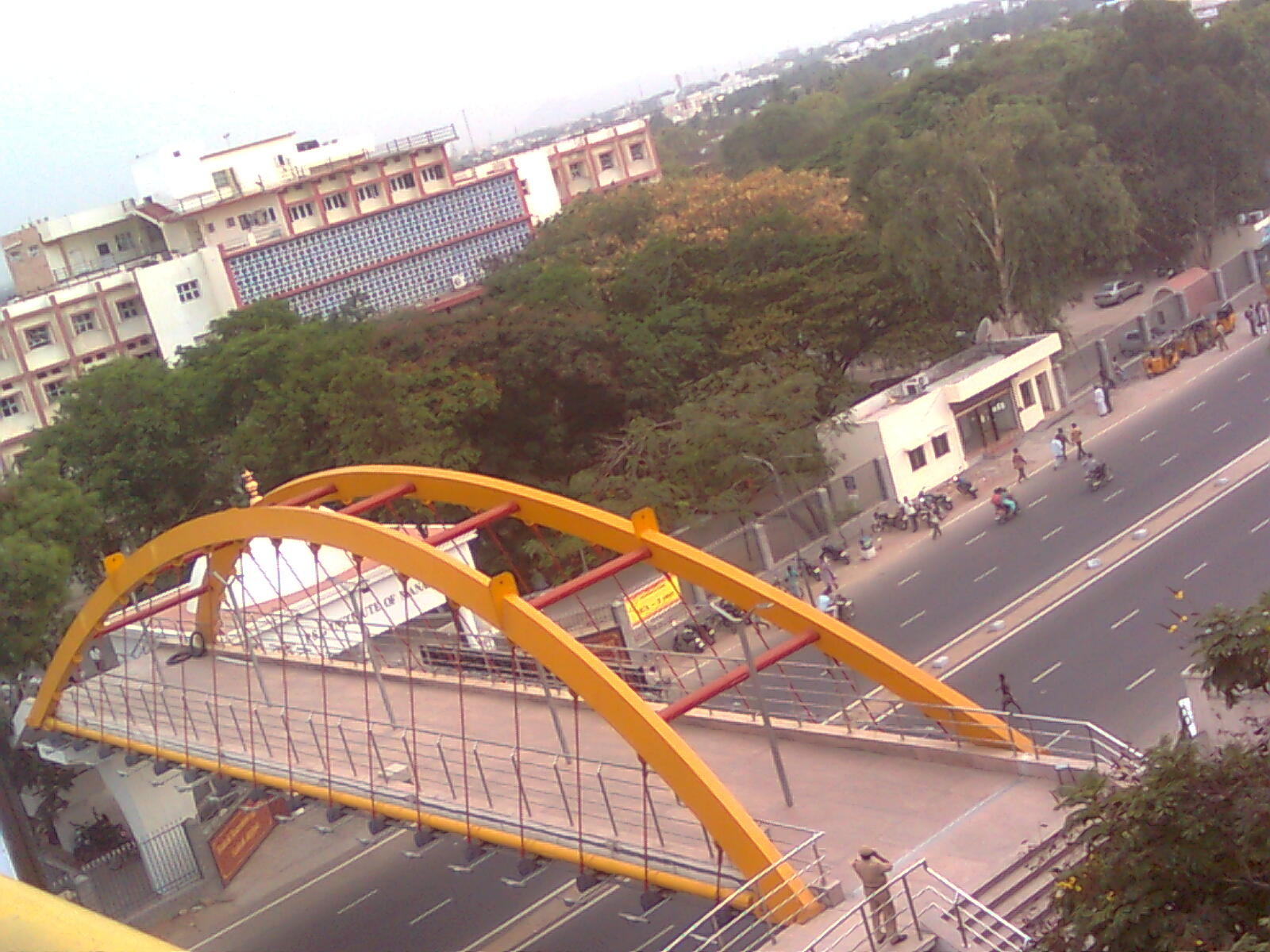
PSG tech overbridge

PSG College of Technology (often abbreviated as PSG Tech) is an autonomous, government aided, private engineering college in Coimbatore, India. It is affiliated with Anna University. It is an initiative of the PSG and Sons Charities Trust.

== History ==
PSG College of Technology was established as PSG Industrial Institute in the year 1926 by PSG and Sons Charities in Peelamedu, Coimbatore. The engineering college was started on the institute campus in 1951 by G. R. Damodaran, who became its first principal. The college was conferred autonomous status by University of Madras in 1978, This status was continued by the Bharathiar University and subsequently by Anna University since 2001.

The college offers approximately 50 full-time and part-time programs in science, engineering, and management at undergraduate and postgraduate levels. These programs are offered by the 11 departments, including engineering and technology, computer applications, management sciences, basic sciences, and humanities. The institute offers three five-year integrated sandwich engineering courses which combine classroom coaching with industrial training, one of the few in the country to offer such a course. Among the undergraduate and postgraduate programmes offered Lokesh NK[1]by the college, many are accredited by the National Board of Accreditation of the All India Council of Technical Education (AICTE). Being autonomous, the college frames its own curricula, updates syllabus, introduces new courses and is empowered to administer its own evaluation.

== Campus ==
The hostels of the college are located on the opposite side of the college campus and so after a failed bid to create a concrete skywalk connecting the two, a steel arch skywalk over the busy Avinashi Road was designed and executed by the civil engineering students at PSG College of Technology in 2007.

=== Sports Facilities ===
The Department of Physical Education maintains the sports infrastructure of the college. The outdoor facilities consist of a football field, hockey field, cricket ground aided with cricket practice wickets, two handball courts, a kho-kho court, four volleyball courts, two badminton courts, two sepak takraw courts, 3 synthetic tennis courts, a throwball court and a non-standard athletic track.

Two basketball courts: synthetic and wood, a wooden-floored badminton court, 4 table tennis boards and 100 chess boards make up the indoor sports facility at PSG Tech.

A stadium is located in the center of the men's hostel that was commissioned and constructed by the faculty and students in 1971. It can currently hold spectators on both sides including a balcony gate and a VIP lounge totaling about 500 spectators.

=== Library ===
Named after the inaugural principal of the college, the Dr. GRD Memorial Library has over 260,000 books, 13,000 CDs/DVDs and 200 printed journals to cater to students, research scholars and faculty members. There is an exclusive digital library with 60 computers connected to highspeed internet.

== Rankings ==
College rankings

Engineering – India
- NIRF (2024): 67
- India Today (2022): 30
- Private colleges
- Outlook India (2022): 8

Business/Management – India
- NIRF (2024): 80

The National Institutional Ranking Framework (NIRF) ranked it 67th among engineering institutes in 2024. NIRF also ranked it 80th in the management ranking. Among top private engineering colleges in India, PSG College of Technology was ranked 8th among engineering colleges by Outlook India in 2022.

== Student life ==
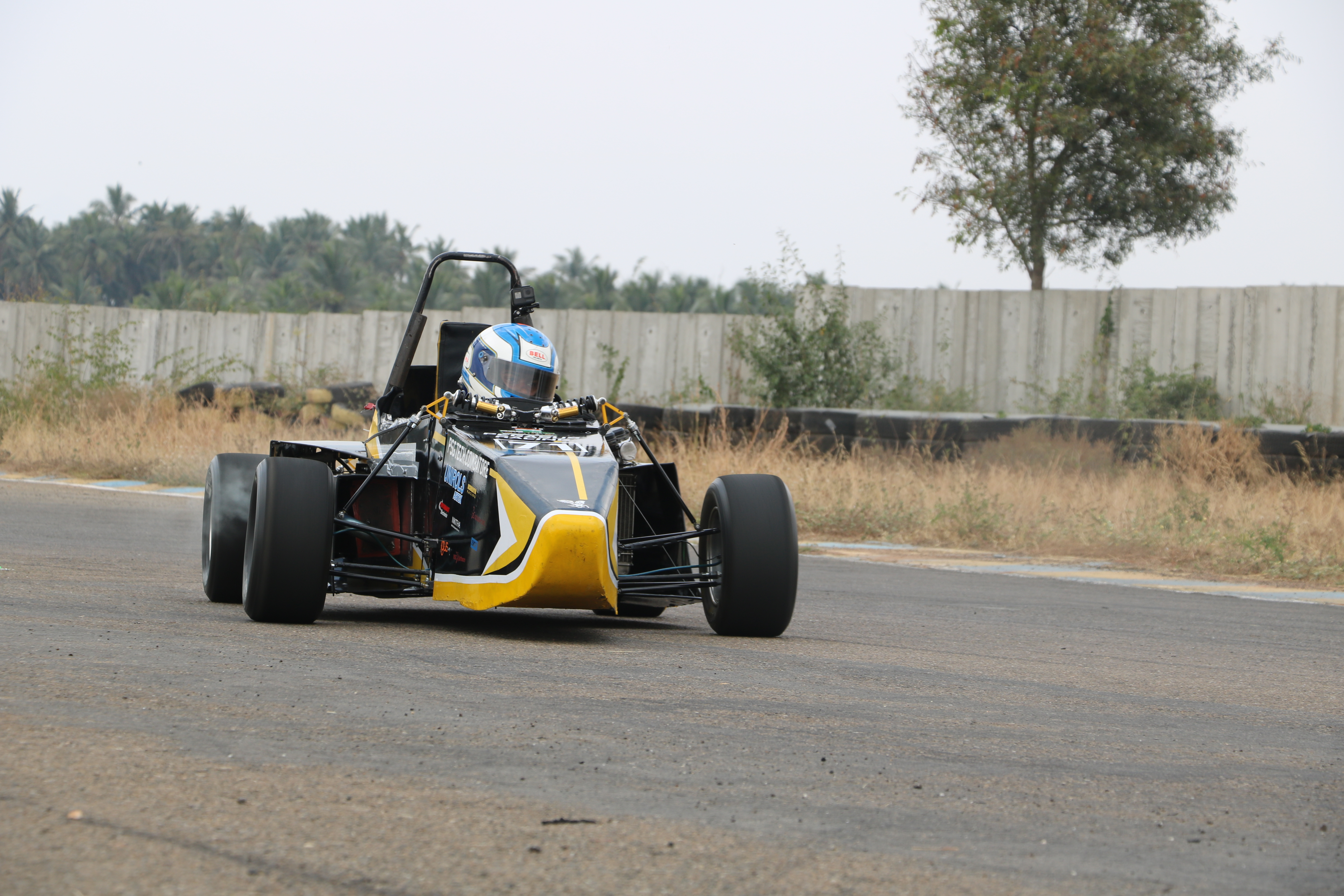
PSG tech Pegasus Racing Formula Student car at 2019 Formula Bharat

=== Clubs ===
The Students' Union is the apex body which controls all the aspects of student life including associations, clubs and societies.

Clubs: Computer Science Engineering Association, Youth Red Cross society, Global Leaders' Forum, Tech Music, Drawing and Painting Club, Book Readers' Club, Entrepreneurs Club, Photography Club, Dramatics Club, IIIE association, IEEE association, Radio Hub,

Planning Forum etc...

Apart from these clubs, The college also has a Formula student team - Pegasus Racing, a Baja team and student wings of NCC and NSS.

=== Hostel ===
PSG Tech hostel was established on 27 February 1958. The hostels accommodate about 4300 students in 14 blocks named from A to N of which 5 blocks dedicated to women. There are five student dining halls, an auditorium, a library, a gym, a computer center and a guest house attached to the hostels.

=== Symposiums ===
Since 2005, the college conducts an international techno-management festival called Kriya. Every year in February, PSG also plays host to Renaissance, a two-day inter-collegiate cultural festival. Intrams is the intra-college cultural festival which is conducted in September.

== Notable alumni ==
- K. Annamalai, ex-IPS officer and former state president of BJP Tamil Nadu unit
- Aparna B Marar, classical dancer
- Y. S. Chowdary, former Minister of State, Science and Technology & Earth Sciences, Government of India
- Cottalango Leon, winner of Academy Award
- Jose K. Mani, Member of Parliament in the Rajya Sabha
- Kalidhindi B. R. Varma, Vice-chancellor, Sri Sathya Sai Institute of Higher Learning
- Kishore Kumar Rajaram, President, Sivananda Saraswathi Sevashram
- Lakshmi Narayanan, ex-vice chairman and ex-CEO of Cognizant and Chairman of ICT Academy
- G. V. Loganathan, former professor, Virginia Tech
- Madhu Bhaskaran, engineer and Professor at RMIT University
- Madhusudhan Rao Lagadapati, executive chairman of Lanco Infratech
- Mahesh Muthuswami, cinematographer
- Mylswamy Annadurai, director of Chandrayaan-1 and Chandrayaan-2, ISRO
- Navin Ramankutty, Professor of Global Food Security and Sustainability at the University of British Columbia
- K. Pandiarajan, businessman and politician
- Ragunathan Rajkumar, George Westinghouse Professor, Carnegie Mellon University
- A. G. Ramakrishnan, professor, Indian Institute of Science
- Shiv Nadar, Founder and Chairman of HCL Technologies
- Singai G. Ramachandran, former secretary of ADMK (IT Wing)
- Siva Umapathy, Shanti Swarup Bhatnagar laureate
- Sundar Raman, CEO of Reliance Sports and Cricket Administrator
- Sundaram Karivardhan, industrialist and motorsport pioneer
- R. M. Vasagam, space scientist and former Project Director, Ariane Passenger Payload Experiment
- C Vijayakumar, CEO, HCL Technologies
