= Mirabeau =

Mirabeau may refer to:

== People ==
- André Boniface Louis Riqueti de Mirabeau (1754–1792), also known as Barrel Mirabeau, brother of Honoré
- Honoré Gabriel Riqueti, comte de Mirabeau (1749–1791), renowned orator, a figure in the French Revolution and son of Victor
- Victor de Riqueti, marquis de Mirabeau (1715–1789), French physiocrat
- Mirabeau B. Lamar (1798–1859), second president of the Republic of Texas
- Mirabeau Lamar Looney (1871–1935), American politician, first female member of the Oklahoma Senate

== Places ==
- Mirabeau, Alpes-de-Haute-Provence, France, a commune
- Mirabeau, Vaucluse, France, a commune
- 8169 Mirabeau, a minor planet

== Other uses ==
- Le Mirabeau, a high-rise building in Monaco
- Mirabeau (company), a Dutch company
- Mirabeau station, a Paris Metro station in Paris, France
- Pont Mirabeau, a bridge spanning the Seine River in Paris
- French battleship Mirabeau (1910s)
- Mirabeau restaurant, Dublin, operated 1972–1984 by Seán Kinsella
- Mirabeau, a sector on the north side of the Circuit de Monaco
- Mirabeau, a sports car by Leblanc
- Mirabeau a 1790s French slave ship captured by Hope
- Jean-Pierre Mirabeau, a Mobile Fighter G Gundam character

== See also ==
- Sibylle Riqueti de Mirabeau, comtesse de Martel de Janville (1849–1932), French writer
- Cours Mirabeau, a street in Aix-en-Provence, France
- Mirebeau, a commune in Vienne, Poitou-Charentes, France
