= Francisco D'Souza =

Indian-American businessman (born 1968)

- Born: 23 August 1968 (age 58); Nairobi, Kenya
- Education: University of Macau; Carnegie Mellon University
- Occupations: Former CEO & Vice Chairman, Cognizant

Francisco D'Souza (born 23 August 1968) is an Indian-American entrepreneur and businessman, who is the former CEO and Vice Chairman of Cognizant — a Fortune 200 global professional services company – co-founded the NASDAQ-100 company in 1994. He succeeded Lakshmi Narayanan as the CEO in 2007 and in 2018 was appointed Vice Chairman, while continuing his role as the CEO till 1 April 2019.

== Biography ==
Francisco D'Souza was born in Nairobi, Kenya, the son of Placido D'Souza, an Indian Foreign Services officer and diplomat who grew up in Pune— and Sushila. His roots are in Anjuna Goa where he would spend part of his childhood in 11 countries. He completed a BBA at the University of East Asia Macau and an MBA at Carnegie Mellon University (CMU).

== Career ==
Following his time at the CMU Tepper School of Business, D'Souza joined Dun & Bradstreet as a management associate in 1992. Cognizant began in 1994 as an in-house project of Dun & Bradstreet, led by D'Souza. From 1996, he held various leadership roles at Cognizant. He was elevated to CEO and joined the Cognizant Board of Directors in January 2007, and promoted to Vice Chairman of the Board in June 2018.

In 2013, D'Souza joined the board of General Electric as its then youngest director. He also served on the Board of Trustees of CMU and as co-chairman of the Board of Trustees of the New York Hall of Science.

D'Souza is a member of the World Economic Forum and the 2019 Chairman of the World Economic Forum's IT Governors Steering Committee. He sits on the Board of Directors of The National Medal of Honor Museum.

In November 2019, MongoDB appointed D'Souza to its board of directors.

In July 2020, Banco Santander appointed D'Souza to a top-tier executive position in support of its digital transformation strategy.

== Awards and honors ==
- 2005 - The Economic Times Entrepreneur Award
- 2009 - named among "America's Best CEOs" by Institutional Investor magazine
- 2013 - named among "100 CEO Leaders in STEM" by STEMconnector
- 2013 - Recognized as the Best CEO, Forbes India
- 2014 - "Newsmaker of the Year" by The Financial Express
- 2017 - #10 on Fortune Businessperson of the Year
