= Acupuncture & Electro-Therapeutics Research =

- Discipline: Alternative medicine
- Language: English
- Edited by: Yoshaiki Omura

Publication details
- History: 1976-present
- Publisher: Cognizant Communication Corporation
- Frequency: Quarterly
- Impact factor: 0.778 (2015)

Standard abbreviations
- ISO 4: Acupunct. Electro-Ther. Res.

Indexing
- CODEN: AEREDS
- ISSN: 0360-1293 (print); 2167-9010 (web)
- LCCN: 76646387
- OCLC no.: 60626286

Links
- Journal homepage; Online archive

Acupuncture & Electro-Therapeutics Research is a quarterly peer-reviewed medical journal covering acupuncture, electrotherapy, and related subjects. It was established in 1976 and is published by Cognizant Communication Corporation. The editor-in-chief is Yoshaiki Omura (New York Medical College). The aim of the journal is "to make acupuncture and electro-therapeutics a universally acceptable branch of medicine."

== Abstracting and indexing ==
The journal is abstracted and indexed in:

- Current Contents/Clinical Medicine
- Excerpta Medica
- Index Medicus/MEDLINE/PubMed
- Index Veterinarius
- CINAHL
- Biological Abstracts
- Chemical Abstracts
- Psychological Abstracts
- Bioengineering Abstracts
- Engineering Index
- Science Citation Index Expanded
- PsycINFO
- Compendex

According to the Journal Citation Reports, the journal has a 2015 impact factor of 0.778.
