= Dr. G.R. Damodaran College of Science =

College in Tamil Nadu, India

Dr. G.R. Damodaran College of Science (Autonomy)
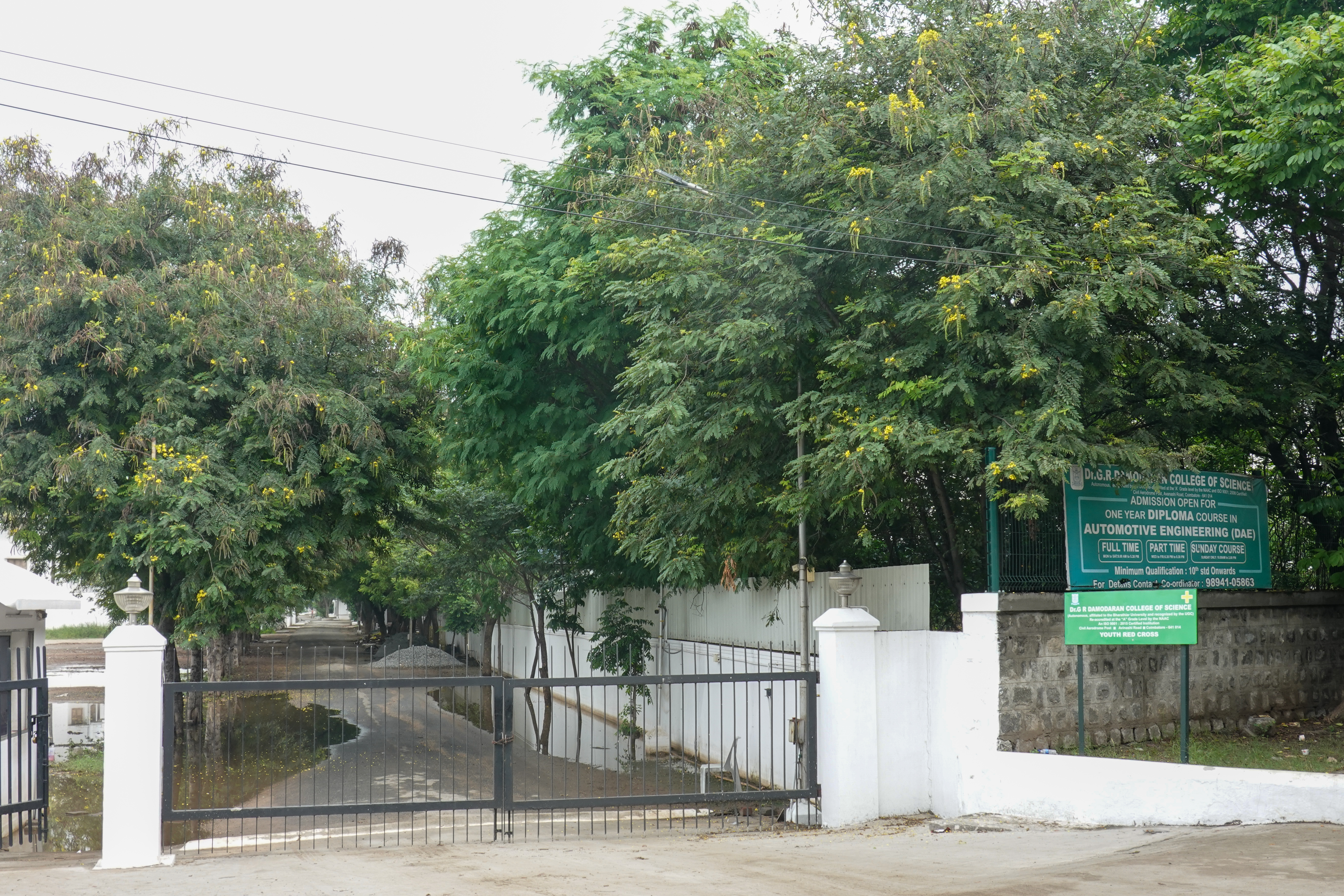
- Main entrance on Avinashi Road
- Other name: GRDCS
- Motto: In Quest of Knowledge
- Type: Autonomous
- Established: 1988; 38 years ago
- Academic affiliations: Bharathiar University, Coimbatore
- Location: Civil Aerodrome Post, Coimbatore, Tamil Nadu, India; 11°2′3″N 77°1′47″E
- Website: www.grd.org/grdcs

Dr. G.R. Damodaran College of Science, also known as GRD College, is an ISO 9001:2015 certified institution in Coimbatore, Tamil Nadu, India.

== History ==
The college was started in 1988. It was granted autonomy by the UGC in 2004. It was re-accredited by NAAC with A Grade in 2009. The academicians follow a mentor-steward spectrum of pedagogical engagement.

== Courses ==
The college offers 15 undergraduate courses including arts and science courses, and 16 postgraduate courses.

== GRD School of Commerce and International Business (GRDSCIB) ==
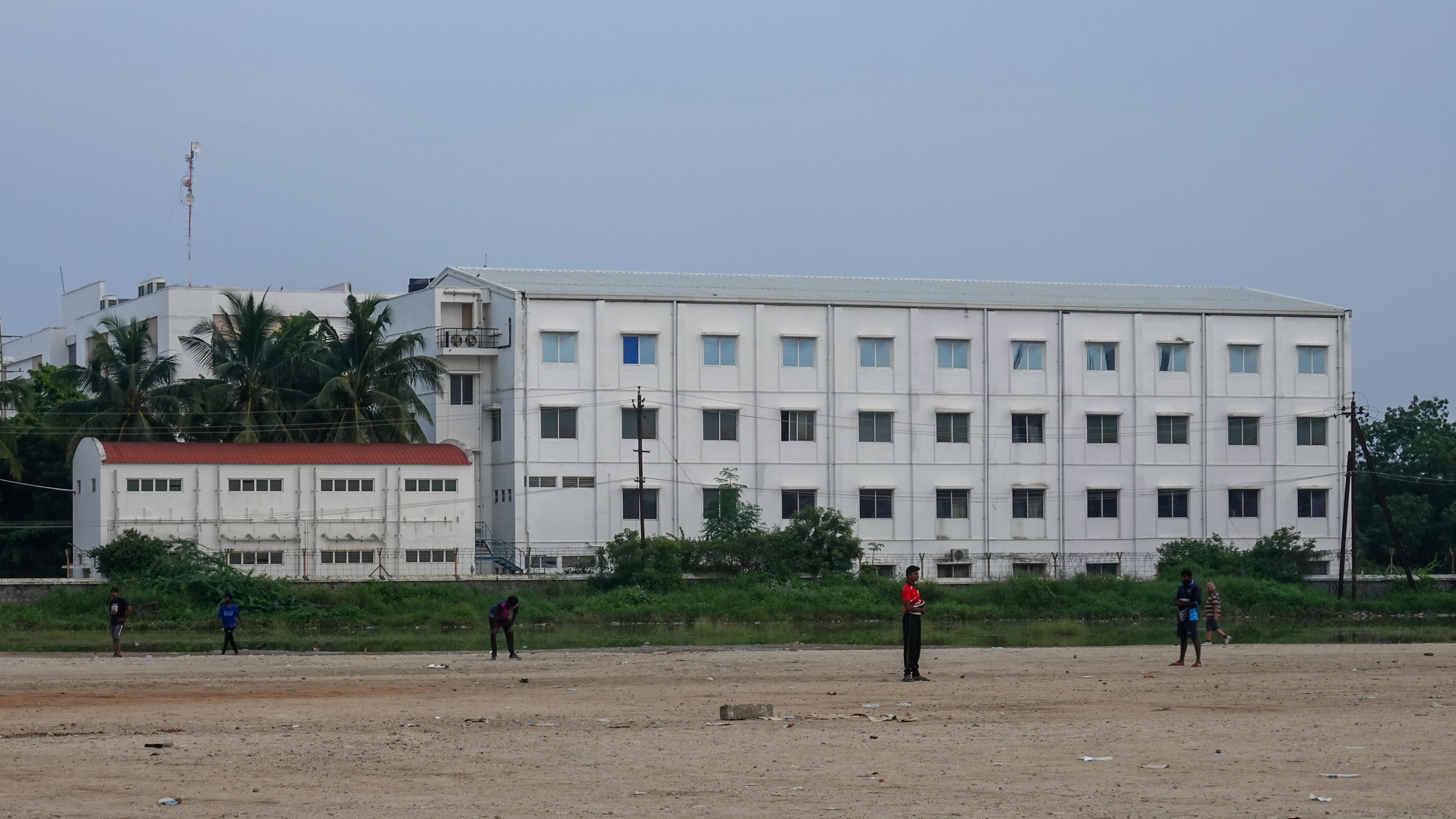
Commerce & Social Work block, view from west

The school offers a two-year MIB programme. The program is designed with the objective to provide training that suits to industry demands. The department also offers an advanced one-year PG diploma program in Project Management/Program and Portfolio Management, Human Resource Management, Enterprise Resource Planning, and International Business.

MIB students can procure one of these PG diploma programmes during their Masters program for advanced standing.

=== Activities ===
Activities include student-directed personality development programs, panel discussions, webinars, industrial visits, outstation seminars, boot camps, seminars, workshops, paper presentations, guest lectures, organizing annual function day, short-term ICT courses, and other relevant certificate programs.

== GRD Institute of Management (GRDIM) ==
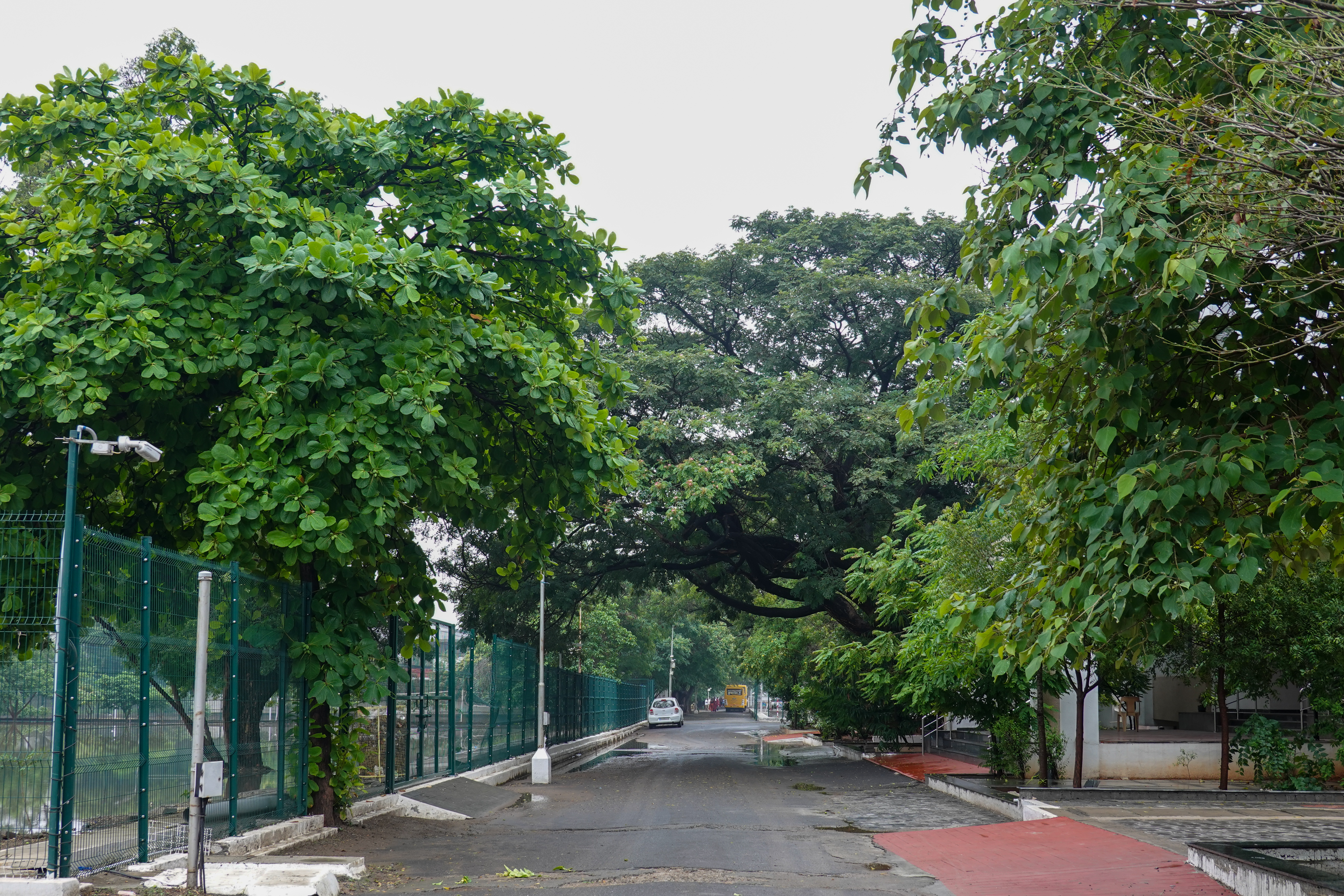
Tree-lined avenue in front of GRDIM

GRDIM commenced in 1992. The institution offers MBA (full- and part-time), M.Phil. (full- and part-time) and Ph.D. (full- and part-time). The institute offers advanced one-year PG diploma programmes in Finance, Business Analytics, and IT Management.

The institution is AICTE approved and graded ‘A’ by CRISIL at National Level. GRDIM was awarded with ‘B-School Leadership Award’ for Best Management Institute in India, by World Education Congress in the ‘Global Awards’ 2012. The course is designed with the objective to mould the students to future managers and entrepreneurs who understands corporate attitudes, challenges and cross-cultural conduct.

The management library has a collection of 30,000 books and subscribes to 60 journals. It has EBSCO online, J-gate and other e-journal facility providing access to new information.

=== Activities ===
GRDIM provides management development programmes like qualitative and quantitative research, short-term courses, ICT courses, language lab, face-to-face with CEOs, guest lectures by renowned professors of foreign universities, webinars, personal branding workshops, industrial visits, outstation seminars, boot camps, national level seminars and workshops, paper presentations, industry exposure, OJT, consultancy projects, etc.

== GRD School of Social Work (GRDSSW) ==
The school started in 1989 from G R Damodaran's second part of the vision "Education as the better means for securing the nation's economic future and social well-being" and since then offers two-year MSW programmes in Medical and Psychiatry, Human Resource Management, and Community Development; M.Phil. and Ph.D. programmes with field work components and professional exposures.

The school offers advanced one-year PG diploma programmes in Professional Skills in Clinical and Counselling Psychology,/Health Services Management; Human Resource Development, and Emergency Management. Students can choose one of these PG diploma program during the two-year PG programme — this is inclusive in the programme structure.

The program and courses aim to prepare students to work effectively in social, economic and political scenarios. Students prepare to keep pace with the changing face of Social Work and the requirements of growing societal needs. The course curriculum has been designed keeping in view the emerging trends as well as contemporary and futuristic human resource requirements.

=== Activities ===
Capacity building programmes such as Qualitative and Quantitative Research with Computational statistics, Workshops, Seminars, Outreach Programmes, Guest lectures (e.g., Human Factors), Case Studies with Role Play (OSCE), Colloquiums, Positive psychology, Leadership and Life Skills training through Boot camps, Certificate structured programmes of evidence based therapies like DBT, CBT - CAT and Integrative psychotherapy with psychodynamic and systemic principles from NIMHANS and other organisations, Association monthly meetings with minutes, Rural Camp, Fieldwork Reviews, Moot Sessions - Social Policy Analysis and HRM Issues, Language Lab for Academic writing (APA & MLA styles) and Professional development (IELTS & TOFEL format) are an integrated part of the curricular and extracurricular activities. Sensitization and promotion of Social Policy, Social Responsibility and Living Healthy is a part of the social work, campus decorum.

== GRD School of Computer Science (GRDSCS) ==
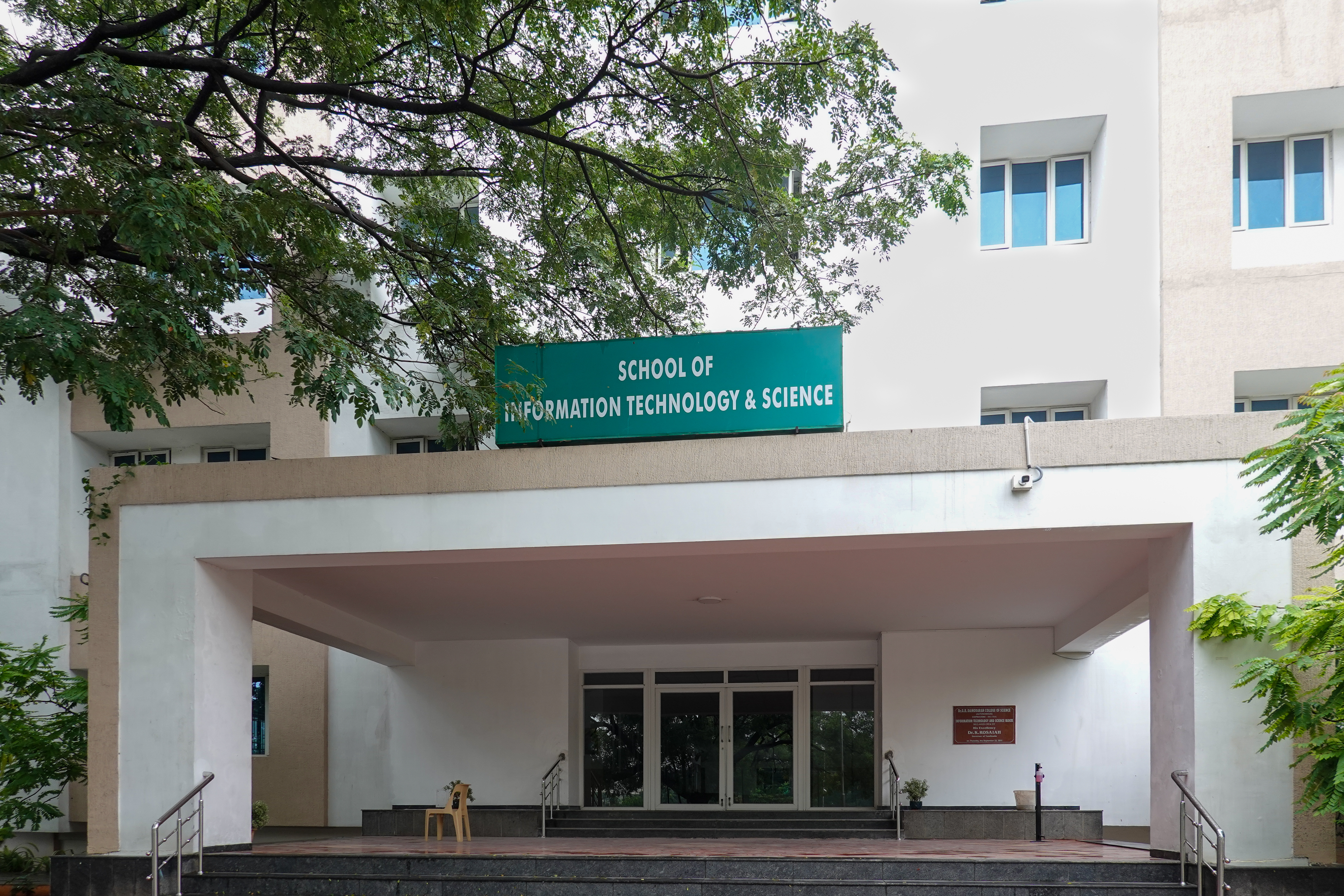
Department of Computer Science block

The aim of the school is to transmit conversant knowledge and competent skills required in the field of computer science. The school offers bachelor's degrees in computer science, information technology and computer applications. For advanced studies the school provides postgraduate degrees like M.Sc. Computer Science with P.G. Diploma in VLSI Design and Embedded Systems; M.Sc. Information Technology with PG Diploma in Cloud Computing and Master of Computer Applications (M.C.A). The Department of Computer Science is also an approved center of Bharathiar University for providing M.Phil. and Ph.D. in Computer Science.

== Campus life ==
Associations include National Service Scheme (NSS), Youth Red Cross, Geo-Computing Club, Placement Cell. The college has sporting activities, with facilities and trainers for basketball, badminton, table tennis, Cricket, Football and volleyball. An IGNOU Study Centre is also present.

== Alumni ==
Alumni associations are spread across the Americas, Europe, Australia and the Middle East. Many of the alumni members hold top positions at various organisations around the world. Kartiki Gonsalves has won the academy awards for the best short documentary at the 95th Academy Awards.

== Notable alumni ==
- Abinandhan Ramanujam - Indian cinematographer / Filmmaker
- Roby Varghese Raj - Indian cinematographer and director
- George Thengummoottil - Filmmaker / Film Editor
- Sandra Thomas, Malayalam film producer and actor
- Sivaram Mony - Filmmaker
- Varun Aditya - Indian Photographer
- Harish Uthaman - Actor
- Kartiki Gonsalves - Academy Award Winning Filmmaker
- C Prem Kumar - Filmmaker

== See also ==
- Bharathiar University
- G R Damodaran
