= Lagadapati =

Lagadapati is a Telugu surname. Notable people with the surname include:

- Madhusudhan Rao Lagadapati (born 1966), businessman
- Lagadapati Rajagopal, Member of Parliament of India
- Lagadapati Sridhar, vice-chairman of Lanco Infratech
- Gopichand Lagadapati, actor, writer, director and producer
