= Kumar Mahadeva =

Sri Lankan businessman

- Born: Sri Lanka
- Education: Harvard Business School, 1978
- Employer: Cognizant
- Office: Chief Executive Officer
- Term: 1994–2003
- Successor: Lakshmi Narayanan

Wijeyaraj Kumar Mahadeva (Tamil: குமார் மகாதேவா) is a Sri Lankan American businessman. He is the founding chairman and chief executive officer of Cognizant Technology Solutions. He was the CEO of Cognizant from 1994 to 2003 and was succeeded by Lakshmi Narayanan. Kumar held senior positions at the BBC, McKinsey, AT&T, and Dun & Bradstreet. He is a member of the Sri Lankan Tamil Ponnambalam-Coomaraswamy family, the son of Deshamanya Baku Mahadeva, a Sri Lankan civil servant who served as chairman of various banks, companies, commissions, and boards.

== See also ==
- Cognizant Technology Solutions
- List of Tamils of Sri Lanka
