= G. R. Damodaran =

Indian educator (1914–1986)

Vice-chancellor of Madras University
- In office 1978–1981

Chairman of Special Committee on the Reorganisation of Polytechnic Education
- In office 1969–1970

Member of the Tamil Nadu Legislative Council
- In office 1974–1978

Member of the Madras Legislative Council
- In office 1958–1970

Member of Parliament, Lok Sabha
- In office 1952–1957
- Preceded by: Constituency established
- Succeeded by: P. R. Ramakrishnan
- Constituency: Pollachi

PSG College of Technology Principal
- In office 1951–1970

Member, Syndicate, Madras University
- In office 1948–1981

PSG Industrial Institute
- In office 1943–1986

Personal details
- Born: 20 February 1914 Coimbatore, Tamil Nadu, India

G. R. Damodaran (20 February 1914 – 1986) was an educationist, an administrator, and founder of The GRD Trust in Coimbatore. He was the founder of PSG College of Technology and founder principal of PSG College of Arts and Science. Dr. G R Damodaran held positions of leadership and served education in a wide range of field and sectors. He was the chairman of the Southern Regional Committee of the AICTE and chairman of the Govt. of India's High Power Committee on the Reorganisation of Polytechnic Education (1969–1970). He was the vice-chancellor of the Madras University. He served as a Member of Parliament and of the Legislative Council of Tamil Nadu.

== Early life and education ==
G. R. Damodaran was born to Divan Bahadur P S G Rangaswamy Naidu and Krishnammal on 20 February 1914. His schooling began in an elementary school in Peelamedu; he continued his education at Sarvajana High School, established by the PSG Charity Trust. His intermediate studies were at Government Arts College, Coimbatore in Mathematics. He completed a B.Sc. (Electrical Engineering) and B.Sc. (Mechanical Engineering) in King's College, New Castle on Tyne, United Kingdom.

== Career ==
In 1943, G. R. Damodaran joined the PSG Industrial Institute. In 1948, he started a Tamil monthly magazine Kalaikathir, devoted to science and technology. It installed a Heidelberg printing machine and computerized photo typesetting machine. He was the founder of PSG College of Technology and founder principal of PSG College of Arts and Science.

He served UNESCO International Committee on training abroad policies, the All India Council for Technical Education, National Council for Vocational Trades and the All India Board of Technicians Education.

He was a member of the Syndicate of the Madras University for 33 years. There he introduced far-reaching changes in the engineering curriculum.

His unswerving commitment to the cause of the rural and urban masses through the NSS and Social Service League which he founded was laudable.

In 1952, he served as a Member of Parliament in Pollachi, Lok Sabha constituency. He was elected to the Legislative Council of Tamil Nadu from the Teachers Constituency and once from the Graduate Constituency. In 1955, he organized adult literacy workshop at Coimbatore.

His stint in politics brought him close to stalwarts like K. Kamaraj, C. Subramanian, R. Venkataraman, Dr. V K R V Rao, Prof. N G Ranga, T T Krishnamachari, Dr. Triguna Sen and others.

== Vision ==
Gayathri Malaikannan, believed education as the better means for securing the nation's economic future and social well-being, He often defined and addressed education as:

"Education deals with the human growth in mind, spirit, character and effective behavior. The habits and attitudes a student acquires, the interest that cultivates, the ideals that is learned to practice - All these becomes the basic for an individual's future growth and the basics to the prosperity of our Nation."

It is taken as the guiding principle of Dr G R Damodaran College of Science, a college posthumously established in 1988 to honour Dr. G. R. Damodaran.

== Contributions ==
- The English books titled The Teacher in You and Evaluation and Grading were written by him.
- He wrote a Tamil book titled Electron.
- His speeches were published in a book titled Listen to a Leader in Education.
- He contributed to a dictionary of technical terms, Kalaichol Agarathi, that was translated from English to Tamil.

== See also ==
- Dr. G.R. Damodaran College of Science
- PSG College of Technology
- PSG College of Arts and Science
