= Kothavadi =

Kodhavadi
- Rural
- Location in Tamil Nadu, India Kodhavadi (India)
- Coordinates: 10.8066°N 77.0503°E
- Country: India
- State: Tamil Nadu
- District: Coimbatore

Languages
  - Official: Tamil
- Time zone: UTC+5:30 (IST)
- Postal code: 641***
- Telephone code: +91-422
- Vehicle registration: TN 38

Kothavadi is a village in Kinathukadavu Taluk, Coimbatore district in the Indian state of Tamil Nadu. Kothavadi is the birthplace of Indian space scientist Mylswamy Annadurai.

== Transport ==
Direct Bus from Coimbatore33C To Kothavadi Direct Bus from Pollachi46 To [Kothavadi] Buses from Kinathukadavu 46, K3 To Kothavadi Available Buses from negamam To Kinathukadavu Available.
