= Brian Humphries (Irish businessman) =

Irish businessman

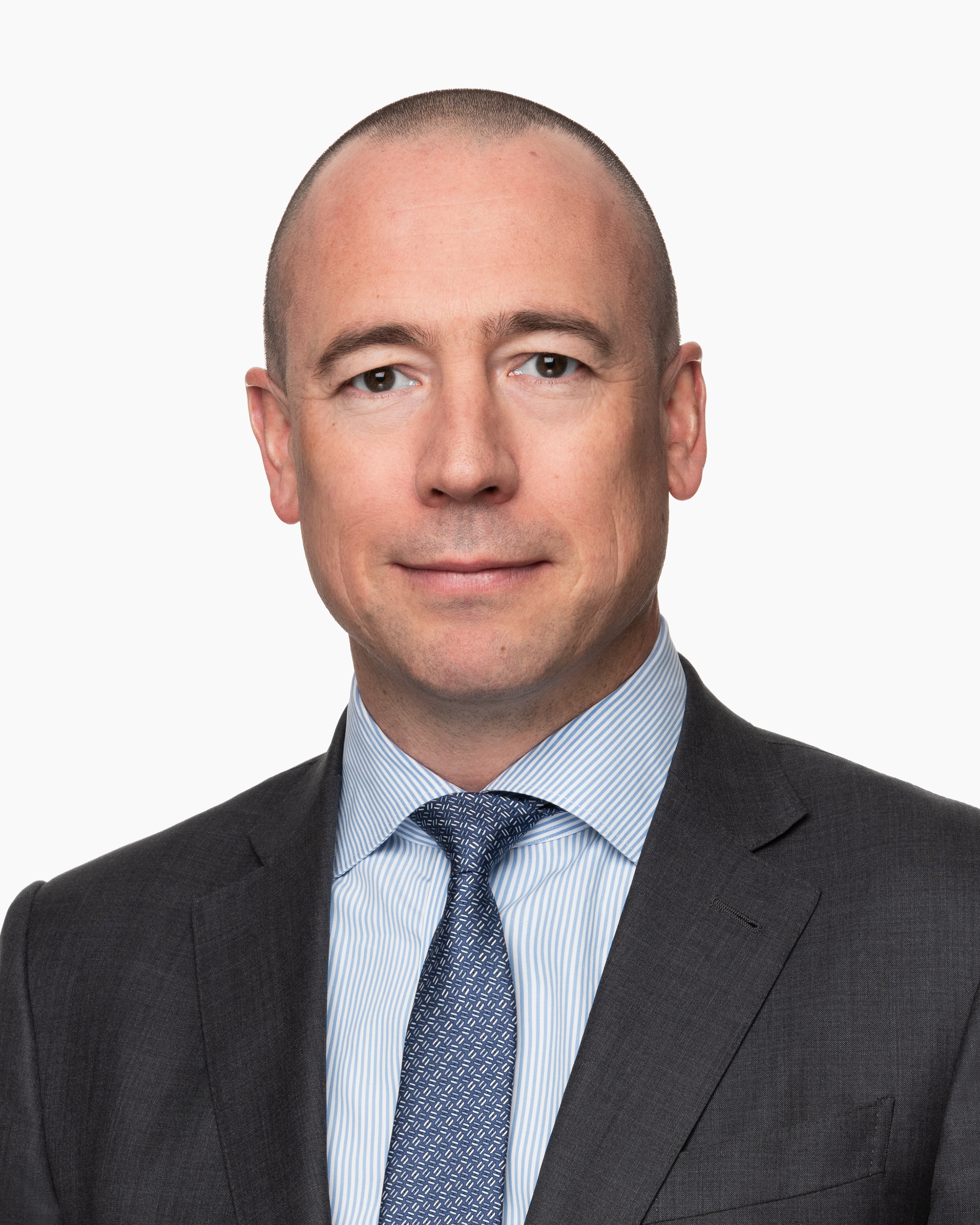
- Born: 1972 or 1973 (age 52–53); County Wicklow, Ireland
- Education: University of Ulster
- Occupation: Former CEO of Cognizant

Brian Humphries (born 1972 or 1973) is an Irish businessman who served as chief executive officer (CEO) of Cognizant from April 2019 to January 2023.

== Education ==
Brian Humphries was born in the County Wicklow, Ireland. He received his Bachelors of Business Administration with Honors, from the University of Ulster in 1996.

== Career ==
He began his career with Compaq and Digital Equipment Corporation. He had various posts at Hewlett-Packard from August 2003 to 2013. He joined Hewlett-Packard in August 2003 as Director of Financial Communications and was raised to Vice President of Growth Markets Organization/Emerging Markets. He also was the President of Enterprise Solutions at Dell EMC from 2013 to 2017. Brian joined Vodafone in December 2016 and was CEO of Vodafone Business from February 1, 2017 to March 2019.

He took over as the CEO of Cognizant in April 2019. In the third quarter of 2021, Cognizant reported annualized voluntary employee attrition of 33 percent and total employee attrition of 37 percent.

On 12 January 2023, Cognizant replaced Humphries with Ravi Kumar S as CEO. Humphries remained with the company as a special advisor until 15 March 2023. The company classified his departure as an involuntary termination without cause under his employment agreement. The board stated that the leadership change was intended to accelerate commercial momentum and revenue growth. Reporting by Mint also linked the decision to high employee attrition, underperformance and a weak growth outlook.

In November 2024, Version 1 appointed Humphries as interim CEO while it searched for a successor, replacing Tom O’Connor. On 11 June 2025, Roop Singh was appointed CEO, and Humphries returned to his role as chairman of the board.
