= Idea Couture =

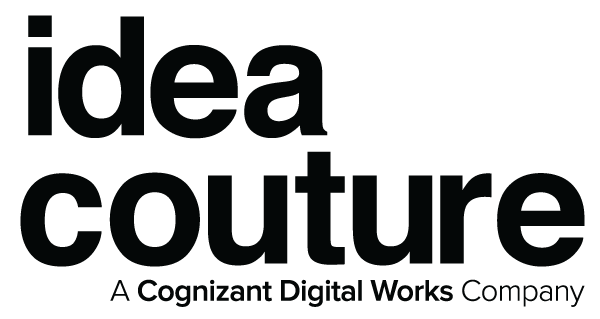
- Type: Subsidiary
- Industry: Consulting firm, Design firm
- Founded: 2007
- Founders: Idris Mootee, Scott Friedmann, Cheesan Chew
- Key people: Idris Mootee, CEO; Scott Friedmann; Cheesan Chew; Patrick Glinkski; Richard Palmer
- Website: www.ideacouture.com

Idea Couture, Inc. was a global strategic innovation and experience design firm founded in 2007 and was based in San Francisco and Toronto. The company had additional offices in London, Mexico, Shanghai and São Paulo while operating globally.

Idea Couture worked with companies in industries including: consumer products, mobile technologies, healthcare and financial services. The company has worked with established companies such as Samsung, HTC, FedEx, Pepsi, Aviva, P&G, MIT and Campbells.

The firm employed over 120 people in a number of disciplines including business strategy, anthropology, behavioral science, data science, communication design, design research, strategic foresight, electrical engineering, healthcare services, brand design, industrial design, interaction design, mechanical engineering, organizational design, and software engineering.

The company was acquired by Cognizant in July 2016 and was subsequently shuttered, and absorbed into Cognizant Moment.

== D-School + B-School ==
The company trademarked the term "D-School + B-School" which is a design thinking methodology for a widely multidisciplinary team combining the capabilities of design schools (D-School) plus business schools (B-School) in its approach. The design side is meant to "humanize" the approach and satisfy the consumers, while the business side derives value and satisfies the companies.

== M/I/S/C/ Magazine ==
M/I/S/C was a magazine on design thinking published by Idea Couture. MISC stood for Movement, Intuition, Structure, Complexity. The content was focused on business through a design lens, navigating the blurred boundaries of business, technology and design. The magazine was released on a seasonal basis. The last issue of the magazine was published in 2018.
