= Ravi Kumar Singisetti =

Indian businessperson

- Born: 1971 or 1972 (age 53–54); Berhampur, India
- Education: Shivaji University; Xavier Institute of Management, Bhubaneswar
- Occupation: CEO of Cognizant
- Board member of: Cognizant; Digimarc; Infosys; International Tennis Hall of Fame; New York Academy of Sciences; TransUnion; United States Chamber of Commerce

Ravi Kumar Singisetti, also known as Ravi Kumar S and S Ravi Kumar, is the chief executive officer of the U.S.-based multinational information technology services company Cognizant. Previously, he was the president of the Indian company Infosys, and earlier in his career, he was a nuclear scientist at the Bhabha Atomic Research Centre and worked for Cambridge Technology Partners, Oracle, PricewaterhouseCoopers, and Publicis Sapient.

== Early life and education ==
Ravi Kumar was born in a Telugu family in Berhampur, Odisha, India. He earned an engineering degree at Shivaji University in Maharashtra and a Master of Business Administration degree at the Xavier Institute of Management, Bhubaneswar.

== Career ==
Early in his career, Ravi Kumar was a nuclear scientist for approximately three years, working on reactors at the Bhabha Atomic Research Centre in Mumbai starting in 1991. He became a senior consultant for PricewaterhouseCoopers and was an associate director at Cambridge Technology Partners. He worked at Oracle from 2000 to 2002 and has also worked for Publicis Sapient.

Ravi Kumar worked at the Indian information technology (IT) company Infosys for approximately twenty years, starting in 2002. He served as the company's president from January 2016 to October 2022 and was named deputy chief operating officer in 2017. He also served on the board of directors. During his tenure, Ravi Kumar oversaw business operations in India, China, Japan, and Latin America; services related to consulting, digital transformation, engineering, and technology; and cloud and infrastructure, data and analytics, and "enterprise package applications service lines."

Ravi Kumar became the chief executive officer of the U.S.-based IT company Cognizant in January 2023. Later that year, Kumar directed a $1 billion dollar investment toward the development of Cognizant’s artificial intelligence infrastructure.

Ravi Kumar also serves on the company's board and has been described as the highest paid Indian executive in the IT sector.

In addition to Infosys and Cognizant, Ravi Kumar has served on the boards of Digimarc, the International Tennis Hall of Fame, the New York Academy of Sciences, TransUnion, and the United States Chamber of Commerce. He became a board member of the U.S.–India Strategic Partnership Forum in 2024. Ravi Kumar has also been a member of the Skills Consortium of the World Economic Forum and the Manhattan chapter of the Young Presidents' Organization.

In 2025 and 2026, Kumar was named to Time Magazine’s TIME100 list of the most influential people in artificial intelligence.

== Personal life ==
Ravi Kumar was based in Hyderabad when he joined Infosys in 2002. He has lived in Manhattan since 2014.
