= Mylswamy Annadurai =

Indian scientist (born 1958)

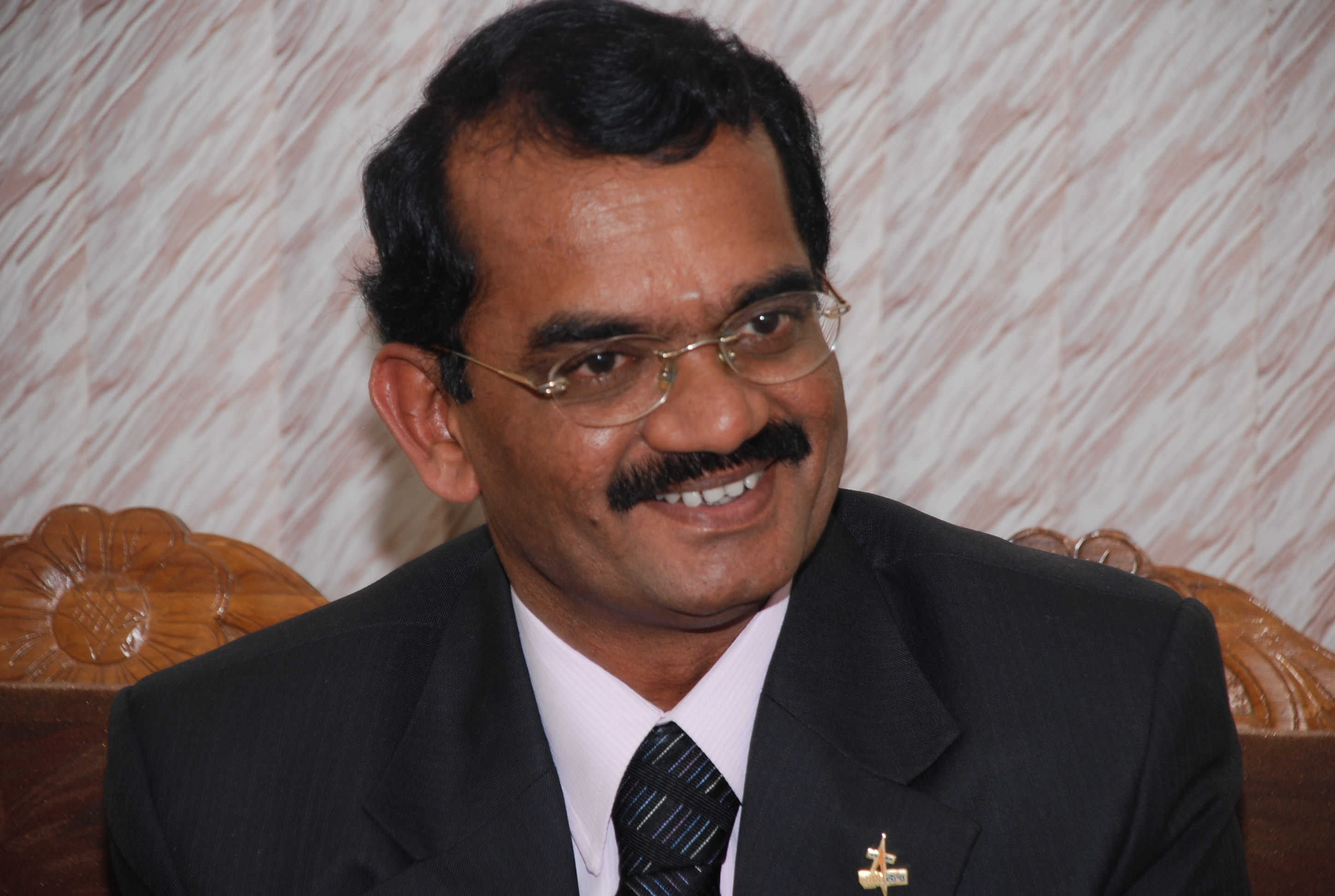
- Born: Mylswamy Annadurai; 2 July 1958 (age 68); Kothavadi, Coimbatore district, Madras State (now Tamil Nadu), India
- Citizenship: Indian
- Education: Anna University, PSG College of Technology, Government College of Technology, Coimbatore (B.E., M.E., PhD)
- Known for: Chandrayaan I, Chandrayaan-2, Mangalyaan, Indian space program
- Political party: Independent
- Spouse: Vasanthi
- Awards: Padmashri
- Scientific career
- Fields: Aerospace engineering
- Workplaces: Indian Space Research Organisation
- Website: https://www.mylswamyannadurai.in

Notes
- Program Director, Chandrayaan-1, Chandrayaan-2 and Mangalyaan

Mylswamy Annadurai (born 2 July 1958) is a prominent Indian scientist serving as vice president for as Tamil Nadu State Council for Science and Technology, Chairman, Board of Governors, National Design and Research Forum. He is often dubbed the "Moon Man of India".

Before taking this assignment he was with Indian Space Research Organisation and served as director of the Indian Space Research Organisation Satellite Centre. During his 36 years of service in the Indian Space Research Organisation, he had some of the major contributions, including two of the major missions of ISRO, namely Chandrayaan-1 and Mangalyaan. Annadurai has been listed among the 100 Global thinkers of 2014 and topped the innovators list. His works are mentioned in textbooks of Tamil Nadu Board of Secondary Education.

== Early life and education ==
He was born on 2 July 1958, in Kothavadi in the Coimbatore district, Tamil Nadu state of India. Annadurai had his schooling in his native village Kodhavady and nearby town Pollachi. He obtained a bachelor's degree in engineering (Electronics and Communication) in 1980 from Government College of Technology, Coimbatore, Tamil Nadu, India, and completed his master's degree in engineering during 1982 from PSG College of Technology, Coimbatore and PhD from Anna University of Technology, Coimbatore, Tamil Nadu in India. He joined ISRO in 1982. As the mission director of INSAT missions, he made some of the original contributions to the INSAT systems maintenance.

== Mars Orbiter Mission ==
India's first mission to Mars, the Mars Orbiter Mission, or Mangalyaan, reached the planet on 24 September 2014 completing its 300-day journey. While ISRO has been researching a Mars mission for many years, the project was only approved by the government in August 2012. ISRO took over a year to work on the spacecraft and bring the project to implementation stage. The Mars Orbiter Mission was launched on 5 November 2013 from the Satish Dhawan Space Centre in Sriharikota, Andhra Pradesh, on the country's east coast. After travelling 670 million kilometres, Mangalyaan is now set to study the surface features, morphology, mineralogy and Martian atmosphere to better understand the climate, geology, origin, evolution and sustainability of life on the planet. It is the most cost effective of all the missions sent to the planet by any other country costing India about $74 million.

== Chandrayaan I & II ==
Chandrayaan-1 was India's first mission to the Moon launched by India's national space agency, the Indian Space Research Organisation (ISRO). The uncrewed lunar exploration mission included a lunar orbiter and an impactor. India launched the spacecraft by a modified version of the PSLV C11 on 22 October 2008 from Satish Dhawan Space Centre, Sriharikota, Nellore District, Andhra Pradesh about 80 km north of Chennai at 06:22 IST (00:52 UTC). The mission was a major boost to India's space program, and India joined a band of Asian nations (China and Japan) in exploring the Moon. The vehicle was successfully inserted into lunar orbit on 8 November 2008.

Image of the spacecraft.

During the period 2004–2008, as the project director for Chandrayaan I, he led a team of engineers and scientists that designed and developed the project to carry instrumentation from ISRO and from NASA, ESA, and Bulgaria to accomplish simultaneous chemical, mineralogical, resource and topographic mapping of the entire lunar surface at high spatial and spectral resolutions. The project was realised within the time frame stipulated and the budget granted. He has paved the way for the future of Indian planetary missions and set an example for international cooperation bringing international organisations like NASA, ESA, and JAXA to work under the leadership of ISRO. Chandrayaan I has received many national and international awards including, the Space Pioneers award for science and engineering at the 28th International conference on Space development, in Florida USA in 2009.

== Director, ISRO Satellite Centre ==
From 2015 to 2018 Annadurai was heading ISRO Satellite Centre, Bangalore as director. The centre is responsible for building satellites for communication, remote sensing, navigation, space science and interplanetary missions. In his tenure as Director of the centre he has overseen making, launching and operationalisation of 30 state of the art satellites.

== Post retirement from ISRO ==
In 2019 Mylswamy Annadurai was appointed as vice president for Tamil Nadu State Council for Science and Technology. In the same year, he was also nominated as chairman, of the Board of Governors, National Design and Research Forum (NDRF) He uses both positions effectively for the development of science and technology both at the state and national level, starting from science outreach at school level to guiding some high-end collaborative research of social relevance by bringing together research labs, academia, industry and policymakers.

== Films ==
- In the movie Mission Mangal based on India's Mars mission, the character of Akshay Kumar is inspired from Annadurai
- In the feature film Chandrayaan based on India's first Moon mission Chandrayaan-1 directed and produced by Santhosh George Kulangara, his and his family members' roles were enacted by south Indian cine artists.

== Previous assignments ==
During his 36 years of service in ISRO Dr Annadurai held various responsibilities. Prior to becoming the Centre Director, he served as programme director for IRS&SSS (Indian Remote Sensing & Small, Science and Student Satellites) that include Chandrayaan-1, Chandrayaan-2, ASTROSAT, Aditya-L1, Mars Orbiter Mission and many Indian Remote Sensing missions. He also contributed to India's National Communication satellite (INSAT) missions as the Mission Director. He was the member secretary of the task team that prepared Chandrayaan I project report. He is the author of several research papers in his specialization.

Annadurai's career profile is as follows,

- 1982 : Joined ISRO
- 1985-88 : Team leader to develop S/W satellite Simulator
- 1988-92 : Spacecraft operations manager, IRS-1A
- 1992-96 : Spacecraft operations manager, INSAT-2A
- 1993-96 : Spacecraft operations manager, INSAT-2B
- 1994-96 : Deputy project director, INSAT-2C
- 1996-01 : Mission director, INSAT-2C
- 1997-98 : Mission director, INSAT-2D
- 1999-12 : Mission director, INSAT-2E
- 2000-10 : Mission director, INSAT-3B
- 2001-02 : Mission director, GSAT-1
- 2003-11 : Mission director, INSAT-3E
- 2003-05 : Associate project director, EDUSAT
- 2004-09 : Project director, Chandrayaan-1
- 2008-13 : Project director, Chandrayaan-2
- 2011-15 : Programme director, IRS & SSS (Indian Remote Sensing & Small, Science and Student Satellites)
- 2015-18 : Director, ISRO Satellite Centre, Bangalore
- 2019 - : Vice president, Tamil Nadu State Council for Science and Technology
- 2019 - : Chairman, board of governors, National Research and Design Forum

During his holidays, Annadurai tours across the country to meet and interact with the students to encourage them to study science.

== Awards and achievements ==
Annadurai has received more than a hundred awards, including,

=== Awards from government ===
- Padma Shri, 2016, one of the highest civilian awards in India.
- The Government of Karnataka awarded him the Rajyotsava Prashasti for Science (2008).
- The Government of Tamilnadu awarded a special citation and a cash award of Rs 2.5 millions for the contribution of Space Science and Technology in India on 2 Oct 2023.

=== Awards from universities and academia ===
- Doctor of Science, DSc (Honoris Causa) conferred by Pondicherry University(2009)
- Doctor of Science, DSc (Honoris Causa) conferred by Anna University, Chennai(2009)
- Doctor of Science, DSc (Honoris Causa) conferred by University of Madras, Chennai (2009)
- Doctor of Science, DSc (Honoris Causa) conferred by MGR University, Chennai (2008)
- Eminent Scientist Award from 76th Indian Science Congress – Madurai Kamaraj University Endowment.
- Distinguished Alumni Award, PSG College of Technology, 2009.
- Sir CV Raman Award-2010 from Periyar University, Salem
- Jewel of GCT(Government College of Technology, Coimbatore) by GCT Alumni
- Personality of the year Awarded by St. Johns International School, Chennai
- Hikal Chemcon Distinguished Speaker Award 2010, the 63rd Annual Session of Indian Institute of Chemical Engineers, Annamalai University.
- National Science and Technology Award, 2011, Sathyabama University, Chennai.
- Distinguished Scientist Award, KC College, Mumbai, Diamond Jubilee Award

=== Awards from ISRO ===
- Annadurai is the recipient of the Hariom Ashram pretit Vikram Sarabhai Research Award for his outstanding Contributions to Systems analysis and Space systems management(2004).
- He is also the recipient of a citation from ISRO for his contribution to the INSAT systems Mission management(2003)
- Team Excellence award for his contribution to the Indian Space Program (2007).
- ISRO Merit Award 2009
- Team Excellence Award 2010 as team leader of Chandrayaan-1 team
- ISRO Outstanding Achievement award, 2014

=== National and international awards from professional bodies ===
- Laurels for Team Achievement Chandrayaan-1, International Academy of Astronautics,2013, Beijing China
- Certificate of Appreciation from Boeing Asian – American professional Association, Houston, USA
- Space Systems award, 2009 from American Institute of Aeronautics and Astronautics, US.
- National Aeronautical Award-2008 from Aeronautical Society of India in recognition of his contributions in the field of satellites/spacecraft
- Fellow, International Academy of Astronautics
- Fellow, Institution of Engineers, India(FIE)
- Fellow, Institution of Electronics and Telecommunication Engineering, India (IETE)
- Fellow, Indian Society for Remote Sensing (ISRS)
- Fellow, Society for shock wave research, Dept. of Aerospace Eng, Indian Institute of Science (IISC), Bangalore
- Fellow, Chennai Science Academy(Formerly Tamil Nadu Science Academy)
- NIQR Bajaj Award for "Outstanding Quality Man 2009"
- H K Firodia awards, 2009 for Science and Technology
- IEI-IEEE Engineering Excellence award 2016 for Contributions and Leadership in Space Technology in service of Humanity
- BHASKARA Award 2016 for his outstanding Scientific Leadership
- SIES (South Indian Education Society) Sri Chandrasekharendra Saraswati National Eminence Award, 2009 for Science and Technology
- "Lifetime Contribution Award" AISYWC-18
- Listed in the TNIE-Uninor Achiever of the year 2009,
- Listed in the Dinamalar-Uninor Achiever of the year 2009,
- Pearl Ratna,2020 by Pearl Education Foundation
- Best Conference paper in the Innovations and Entrepreneurship, Annual Intl Conference by Industry Studies Association, USA, 3-4 Jun 2021 that carried US$500 cash prize and an award plaque
- Dr APJ Abdulkalam memorial Science and technology Achievement award,2023 by Indian Science Forum Oman at National University for Science and Technology, Oman
- Life Time Achievement award 2024-25 for the contribution to Aero Space, University of California, Los Angeles, USA
- Award of Commendation for the outstanding contribution for Space science and Technology by Franklin Township Council, Somerset County, State of New Jersey, USA, 30 Sep 2024

=== Awards from social and public forums ===
- Vivekananda Award for Human Excellence by Rama Krishna Mission
- Kongu Achiever Award 2009 From NIA Trust, Pollachi.
- Best Tamil Scientist Award, Makkal Viruthu, Makkal TV, 2009
- Amara Bharathi National Eminence Award for Science and Technology, 2010
- Karmaveerar Kamaraj Award,2010 from Chennai Mhahajana sabha
- Dr Rajah Sir Muthiah Chettiar Birthday Commemoration Award for 2012.
- "Listed among 100 Global thinkers of 2014 and topped the innovators list "
- Lifetime achievement award, 2015, SRV Schools, Trichy
- Tamilan Award 2016, for Science and Technology by Puthiya Thalaimurai TV
- Global Indian for Science, 2017 awarded by ICICI and Times Group
- Life Time Achievement Award in the field of science and technology by Union Bank of India
- C.Pa.Aditanar Literary Award 2013
- Poorna Chandra award from Rotary Club, Coimbatore.
- Tamil Ma-mani award, from Tirupur Tamil Sangam.
- Tamil Achiever Award,2011 by Bharathi Tamil Sangam, Kolkata.
- Example to Youth Award.
- Kalingarayar Award -2016, by Kongu Charitable Trust, Tamil Nadu
- Citizen Extraordinary Award-2014, by Rotary Club Bangalore
- Lifetime Achievement – Muthamizh Award-2108, Muthamizh Peravai
- "Mars Man", by Front liners- 2018, Kuwait,
- Lifetime Achievement Award, 2019, Rotary International Pollachi
- Life Time Achievement Award, 2019, by Govt Higher Secondary School Alumni, Velandampalayam, Tamil Nadu
- Mahatma Gandhi Award, 2019, Gandhi World Foundation,
- Lifetime Achievement award, 2019, Muscat Tamil Sangam,
- Sri Adhi Sankara Award, 2019, Shri Adhi Sankara Peravai,
- Sony YAY award,2020,
- Senthamiz Award, 2021, Gandhi World Peace Foundation
- Manavai Mustafa Memorial Award for Science, 2021
- Lifetime Achievement Award for contributions to Space Science, Weekend Leader an online portal and Ethiraj College Chennai, 2024
- Pride of Tamil Nadu - Icon of Scientific Excellence 2025, Award by Galatta Media

Annadurai's publications and works are being widely referred by satellite operators, one of his works has been referred in a US patent.

He has written eight books in Tamil namely,

- 1.Kaiyaruke Nila
- 2.Siragai virikkum Mangalyaan
- 3.Valarum Ariviyal
- 4.Ariviyal Kalanjiyam and
- 5.Vinnum Mannum.
- 6. India-75
- 7. Periyarum Ariviyalum
- 8. Ariviyalum Maanudamum

The Book" Kaiyaruke Nila" has won S. P. Adithanar Literary award for the year 2013. The book, " Vinnum Mannum" has won Manvai Mustafa Memorial Science Award for the year 2021 The book Siragai virikkum Mangalyaan has been translated in Kannada language.
