= Navin Ramankutty =

Navin Ramankutty (1970) is an agricultural geographer. As of 2015 he is a professor of Global Food Security and Sustainability at the University of British Columbia Ramankutty studies changes in land use and agricultural practices, and the effect on global food production.

== Early life and education ==
Ramankutty earned a B.Sc. in Mechanical Engineering at the PSG College of Technology in India in 1991. He received a Master of Science in atmospheric science from the University of Illinois in 1994, with the thesis An Empirical Estimate of Climate sensitivity. He then earned a Ph.D. in land resources at the University of Wisconsin-Madison in 2000.

== Career ==
After graduation Ramankutty worked as an assistant research scientist on a project at the Nelson Institute Center for Sustainability and the Global Environment, University of Wisconsin-Madison, on the development of the first worldwide land use maps. Information from these studies was used in the National Geographic Atlas of the World, 8th edition.

In 2006 he became an assistant professor in the McGill University geography department, and in 2014 moved to the University of British Columbia as a professor of global food security and sustainability.

== Publications ==
Ramankutty has published more than 100 articles on various topics about land use and food security.
