= Kalidhindi B. R. Varma =

Indian materials scientist (born 1950)

kalidindi B R Varma
- Born: 1 June 1950 (age 76); Andhra Pradesh, India
- Education: PSG College of Technology
- Scientific career
- Fields: Materials Science
- Workplaces: Vice Chancellor, Sri Sathya Sai Institute of Higher Learning

Kalidindi Varma (born 1 June 1950 in Andhra Pradesh) is an Indian materials scientist. He received a PhD degree in Physics from Madras University, Chennai, India in 1981. He was a postdoctoral researcher with the Dept. of Pure and Applied Chemistry, Strathclyde University, Glasgow, United Kingdom. He then joined the Indian Institute of Science, where he was a professor with the Materials Research Centre. Currently, he is the Vice Chancellor of Sri Sathya Sai Institute of Higher Learning. His research interests include dielectrics, ferroelectrics (including relaxors), non-linear optics and electro-optics. The focus has been on functional ceramics, glass nanocrystal composites, single crystals etc. He has authored or co-authored over 200 papers in various international journals.
