= Mirabeau (company) =

- Company type: Private
- Industry: Digital agency
- Founded: Amsterdam (January 2001)
- Headquarters: Amsterdam, Netherlands
- Key people: Adjan Kodde; Erik Hamoen; Godfried Bogaerts; Heini Withagen
- Parent: Cognizant
- Website: www.mirabeau.nl

Mirabeau B.V. is a digital agency headquartered in Amsterdam, Netherlands. Mirabeau has offices also in Eindhoven, and Rotterdam — both in the Netherlands — Paris, and Guangzhou. It employs about 300 people. The company was acquired by Cognizant in 2016.

== History ==
In 2001, the founders Adjan Kodde, Erik Hamoen, Godfried Bogaerts and Heini Withagen started the company in Amsterdam. Mirabeau's first set of clients — Funda, Aegon, ING — have helped to boost the company's growth since its early days. In 2004, Mirabeau won its first Usability Award for its work, Funda's website. In 2005, they opened an office in Eindhoven, followed in 2006 by another one in Rotterdam. In 2010, Mirabeau won the Dutch Interactive Award for KLM website and in 2012, for its work with Jumbo Supermarkten. Mirabeau is classified by Deloitte as a "Best Managed Company".
