= R. M. Vasagam =

Indian space scientist (1943–2025)

Ramaswamy Manicka Vasagam (1943 – 14 February 2025) was an Indian space scientist and a specialist in space systems including satellites and launch vehicles. In his career spanning close to three decades in the Indian Space Research Organisation, he held responsibilities including the Project Director for Ariane Passenger Payload Experiment— India's first indigenous geostationary communication satellite project, and later the Director of the Advanced Technology and Planning at the ISRO Headquarters. He was later the Vice Chancellor of Anna University and was until his death the Chancellor of Dr. M.G.R. Educational and Research Institute.

Vasagam was also the Project Director for India's first low-earth orbit earth observation satellite Bhaskara.

== Background ==
Vasagam was born in 1943. After graduating from PSG College of Technology in 1963, he completed his Master of Engineering in Electrical Engineering from Indian Institute of Technology Madras in 1965.

Vasagam died on 14 February 2025.

== Career ==
Vasagam joined India's space programme in 1965 while it was still Indian National Committee for Space Research. While at ISRO, he worked across functions including launch, planning and evaluation group, control systems, satellite centre and advanced technology and planning. He was the Project Director for India's first indigenous geostationary communication satellite project, APPLE during 1977–1983. In 1994, he took over as the Director, Directorate of Advanced Technology and Planning, ISRO Headquarters, Bangalore.

During 1996–1999, he was the Vice Chancellor of Anna University, Chennai. He was later the Chairman of Tamil Nadu Institute of Information Technology Chennai (June 1999 – October 2001), and Director (IT) at Karunya Institute of Technology and Sciences, Coimbatore. He also held the post of Vice Chancellor (June 2003 – April 2006) and Pro-Chancellor (April 2006 – September 2008) at Dr. M.G.R. Educational and Research Institute. Vasagam was the Chancellor, Dr. M.G.R. Educational and Research Institute, Chennai.

His other areas of interest included self-reliance in space systems, reusable launch vehicles and serviceable satellites.

== Awards ==
- Hari Om Ashram Prerit Vikram Sarabhai Research Award, 1981, by PRL, Department of Space, Govt. of India.
- Padma Shri, 1982 by the Govt. of India.
- IEEE Centennial Medal, Bangalore Section, 1984 IEEE.
