= Cottalango Leon =

Indian scientist (born 1971)

- Born: 1971 (age 54–55); Thoothukudi, Tamil Nadu, India
- Education: PSG College of Technology, Arizona State University
- Occupation: Computer graphics technician
- Years active: 1996–present
- Known for: 2016 Academy Award
- Notable work: Sony Pictures Imageworks itView technology
- Spouse: Roopa
- Children: 1

Cottalango Leon (born 1971) is an Indian-American computer graphics technician who won the Academy Award for scientific and technical achievement jointly with Sam Richards and J. Robert Ray in 2016.

Leon won the Academy Award for "the design, engineering and continuous development" (Note: As per the Academy's official notification.) of Sony Pictures Imageworks itView technology, a digital 3D film review software. Leon worked on the itView technology for eight years as the chief contributor.

Schooled in India, Leon is an Arizona State University alumnus. He has worked at Sony Pictures Imageworks since 1996, and has contributed to the making of several commercially successful films, including the Spider-Man film series and the Men In Black film series.

== Early life and family ==
Leon was born at his mother's family residence in Thoothukudi, Tamil Nadu in 1971. Both his parents – mother Rajam Mariasingam and father Loorthu – were primary school teachers. When Leon was young, his parents moved from the south of Tamil Nadu to Coimbatore. Leon's early years were spent in this city – a place he still visits every two years.

Leon attended the Government High School at Kallapalayam, a village in the Sultanpet Block of Coimbatore. After studying here till grade VII, he studied from grade VIII to grade XII at Kadri Mills High School in Coimbatore. During his childhood, Leon became interested in the subjects of mathematics and science, and also developed, as per him, a keen interest in "the visual aspect of movies". Subsequently, Leon attended college at the PSG College of Technology from 1988 till 1992, completing his Bachelor of Engineering degree in computer science. He completed his M.S. in computer science from Arizona State University in 1996, specialising in computer graphics.

Leon married Roopa in 2001. Roopa also belongs to southern Tamil Nadu, having lived there till her marriage to Leon. The couple have a daughter Shruthi and live in Culver City.

== Career ==
After graduating, Leon joined the New Delhi firm Softek LLC and worked with them for two years till 1994. As per Leon, during this time, he became inspired by Jurassic Park after watching the film and decided to pursue his career in the technologies used in its making. After completing the master's degree at Arizona State University in 1996, Leon worked for a short time as a video game programmer with DreamWorks Interactive, before joining Sony Pictures Imageworks in 1996, where he continues working to date, currently holding the position of Principal Software Engineer.

At Imageworks, as per Leon, he was asked to develop an improved digital film review software as an alternative to a then existing software. Leon released the initial version within two months of having been assigned the job; after receiving positive feedback from the artists using the software, Leon kept updating various functionalities of the software over the years. This digital 3D film review software, itView, led Leon to get an Academy Award in 2016. Leon mentions working alone on the project for many years, and that he was over time given a team when the project achieved significant growth. In a 2016 media interview, Leon says that he worked on the itView technology for eight years as the chief contributor.

To date, Leon has worked on several commercially successful films, including Stuart Little, the Spider-Man film series, the Men In Black film series, Cloudy with a Chance of Meatballs, The Smurfs, Hotel Transylvania, and Open Season.

== 2016 Academy Award ==
Leon, at the age of 44, won the 2016 Academy Award for scientific and technical achievement for "the design, engineering and continuous development" of Sony Pictures Imageworks itView technology. In a ceremony held on 13 February 2016 at Beverly Wilshire Hotel in Beverly Hills, California, Leon received the Academy Award jointly with Sam Richards and J. Robert Ray. As per the Academy, these set of awards are bestowed upon individuals who have contributed significantly over time – and not necessarily in the past year – to the motion picture industry.

Richard Edlund, Chair of the Scientific and Technical Awards Committee at the Academy of Motion Picture Arts and Sciences praised the "outstanding, innovative work" of awardees, adding that their contributions "have further expanded filmmakers’ creative opportunities ..." The Academy's award citation praised itView's API plugin and varied functionalities, mentioning that "itView provides an intuitive and flexible creative review environment that can be deployed globally for highly efficient collaboration." Leon said that "the award was not totally unexpected" but that it felt "good to be recognised by the Academy and the wider industry."

== See also ==
- List of Indian winners and nominees of the Academy Awards
