= Pilot Software =

- Industry: Software Development
- Founded: 1986; 39 years ago
- Fate: acquired
- Parent: SAP AG

Pilot Software, Inc. is a long-time United States business intelligence vendor that now focuses on operational performance management. SAP AG acquired Pilot Software in February 2007 and Pilot Software's product, PilotWorks, has been rebranded SAP Strategy Management.

== History ==
In 1986, Pilot built the first client/server EIS system. The next year, the company's technologies were adapted by Analog Devices to form the first “Balanced scorecard” implementation. Pilot has garnered the largest deployments of performance management in both commercial organizations and in the United States federal market.

From its founding in the 1980s until 1994, Pilot was an independent software company. In 1994 Pilot was acquired by Dun & Bradstreet corporation. Over time D&B began to break itself apart, and as part of that reorganization Pilot was sold in 1997 to Platinum Equity Holdings. In 2000 Pilot was again sold, this time to Accrue Software. Accrue later went through significant business challenges, and in 2002 the assets of Pilot were purchased by Pilot management and Pilot again became an independent software company.

On February 20, 2007, Pilot announced that it was being acquired by SAP AG. The deal price was not disclosed.
