= Aparna B. Marar =

Indian dancer and engineer

Aparna B Marar
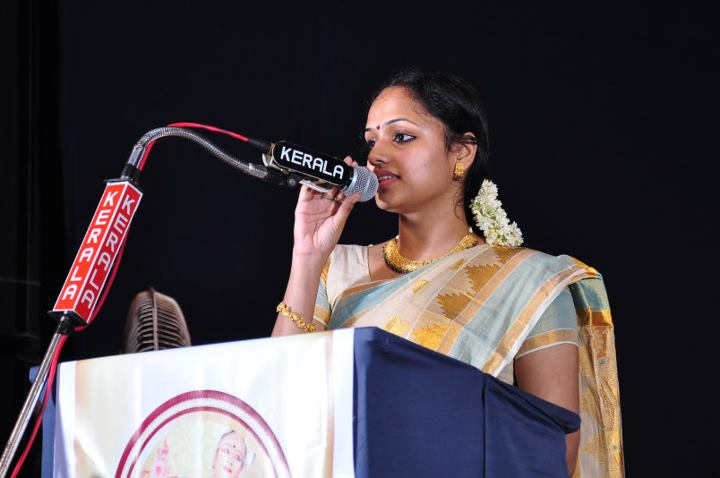
- Marar giving a talk at the Kerala Sangeetha Nataka Akademi
- Born: Aparna Balram Marar; Guruvayoor, Kerala, India
- Occupations: Dancer, educator, organiser, singer
- Career
- Dances: Mohiniyattom, Kuchipudi, Bharathanatyam

Aparna B. Marar is an Indian classical dancer, organiser, art educator, choreographer and singer. She is also an engineer with a postgraduate degree in wireless communication engineering from PSG College of Technology. She has received numerous honours including the Kerala Sangeetha Nataka Academy's Yuva Prathibha Award, Calicut University's Kalathilakam Award, and a national scholarship by Ministry of Culture.

She is an empanelled artist of Indian Council for Cultural Relations, and a member of the American Dance Therapy Association. She is the director of the Kalabharathi Foundation for Indian Culture and Heritage, a non-profitable cultural organization, regularly organising festivals, workshops and welfare programmes.

Marar takes part in art appreciation programmes for the common people and students.

== Professional life and career ==
She is a student of Kalamandalam Kshemavathy in Mohiniyattom. She trained under Isaimani R. Vaidyanatha Bhagavathar in Carnatic music.

Under the banner of the Kalabharathi Foundation for Indian Culture and Heritage, Marar organises festivals for the promotion of youth in Indian classical arts.

== Awards and honours ==
- Yuva Prathibha Award by Kerala Sangeetha Nataka Akademi in 2010 in Mohiniyattom
- Kalathilakam awards by Calicut University in 2009 and 2010
- Secured first prize in Mohiniyattom, Bharathantyam in Calicut University interzone arts festival 2009 and 2010
- Received the scholarship to young artists by Ministry of Culture, Government of India in Mohiniyattom- 2009
- Winner in Inter-university national youth festival 2010 held at Thirupathy, in classical dance
- Empanelled artist of Indian Council for Cultural Relations
- Graded artist of Doordarshan, India
- Associate member of American Dance Therapy Association, 2014
- Member of Student Grievance Redressal Cell, University of Calicut in 2010
- Member of International Dance Council – UNESCO, 2011
