= Madhu Bhaskaran =

Indian engineer

- Born: Chennai, India
- Education: PSG College of Technology; RMIT University (M.E., Ph.D.)
- Known for: "electronic skin"
- Spouse: Sharath Sriram
- Scientific career
- Fields: Electronic materials engineering
- Workplaces: RMIT University

Madhu Bhaskaran is an Indian engineer and Professor at RMIT University. She co-leads the Functional Materials and Microsystems Research Group at RMIT University She won the APEC Aspire prize in 2018 for her development of "electronic skin".

== Early life and education ==
Madhu Bhaskaran was born and grew up in Chennai in India. After high school she went on to study Electronics and Communications Engineering at PSG College of Technology in Coimbatore from 2000 to 2004, where she met her partner Sharath Sriram. After moving to Australia, Bhaskaran completed a Masters in Microelectronics Engineering at RMIT University in 2005, and graduated with a Ph.D. in Electronic Materials Engineering four years later.

== Career ==
After completing her PhD in 2009, Madhu Bhaskaran won a competitive Australian Postdoctoral Fellowship to investigate piezoelectric thin films. Bhaskaran's group measured the potential of piezoelectric nano-films to provide energy for small electronic devices. Bhaskaran's research interests include functional oxide thin films, wearable technologies and stretchable electronics which can be applied in monitoring health and in communications.

Bhaskaran's work on combining functional oxide materials processed at high temperatures with elastic and plastic materials has led to stretchable electronics and sensors, that can be worn as electronic skin. Bhaskaran is a member of the Australian Nanotechnology Network and her team focuses on the characterisation of semiconductor interfaces (metal-silicide and silicide-silicon), characterisation of piezoelectric thin films, and micro-scale semiconductor and microsystem fabrication. Bhaskaran's research use a material called polydimethylsiloxane (PDMS) in the design of their devices. PDMS is stretchable, transparent and non-toxic, and it has been used in contact lenses, and skin and hair products. Her publications (December 2005 – August 2018) include one edited book, six book chapters, 106 journal articles, 36 conference proceedings – totalling 152 publications and five patents.

Bhaskaran has obtained over $5 million in competitive research funding for projects and equipment, and in an industry partnership, Bhaskaran's research team and Sleeptite were awarded $1.7 million in a Cooperative Research Centre Projects (CRC-P) grant from the Federal Government in July, 2018. These funds will be used to develop a silicon fabric with sensors to monitor sleep. As part of the 23rd Australian Institute of Physics Congress, Professor Bhaskaran is serving on the COMMAD Scientific Advisory Committee

=== Board service ===
An advocate for young researchers and women in science, Bhaskaran is a co-founder of the Women Researchers’ Network at RMIT University and Board member of Women in STEMM Australia. Bhaskaran was one of six women in science recently featured in "Just some of the Australian women killing it in science leadership right now" published by Women's Agenda in 2018. Professor Bhaskaran says, "What gives me happiness is that I have managed to do many things beyond research in my career so far – this includes mentoring PhD students and postdocs, holding leadership positions in the Higher Degrees by Research space (and that has helped enhance the research environment at my workplace) as well as contributing to the gender diversity space." Bhaskaran currently serves with the Expert Advisory Group to the Australian Government's Decadal Plan for Women in STEM and recently attended an APEC Women in STEM workshop 'Making the Case for APEC Women in STEM‑Partnership and Impact’.

== Awards and honours ==
Professor Madhu Bhaskaran has received the following honours and awards for her research:

- International Postgraduate Scholarship 2006-2009
- Australian Research Council Postdoctoral Fellowship 2010-2014
- Research Media Star Award 2011
- Victoria Fellowship Physical Sciences 2015
- Australian Research Council DECRA Fellowship 2016–present
- Named one of Top 10 Innovators under 35 for Asia, MIT Technology Review, 2016
- Australian inventors on MIT's top 10 'Innovators Under 35' list
- Eureka Prize for Outstanding Early Career Researcher 2017
- Named one of Australia's Most Innovative Engineers by Engineers Australia 2017
- Batterham Medallist, Australian Academy of Technological Sciences and Engineering, 2018
- Fellow of the Australian Academy of Technological Sciences and Engineering, 2022

In 2018 she won the Australian Academy of Technological Sciences and Engineering's Batterham Medal and the Victorian QuickFire Challenge: Driving Device Innovation. Nominated by Australian Academy of Science, Bhaskaran also won the APEC Science Prize for Innovation, Research and Education (ASPIRE). ASPIRE recognises young scientists from Asia–Pacific Economic Cooperation (APEC) member economies who have demonstrated a commitment to excellence in innovation, research and education.
