= Siva Umapathy =

Indian chemist and professor

- Born: 10 June 1959 (age 67); Tanjavur, Tamil Nadu, India
- Education: University of Madras; PSG College of Technology; University of Otago; Rutherford Appleton Laboratory; University of York; University of Nottingham
- Known for: Studies of molecular dynamics
- Awards: 1989 UoSC Young Investigator Award; 2003 Sir C. V. Raman Young Scientist Award; 2004 Shanti Swarup Bhatnagar Prize; 2004 CRSI Bronze Medal Medal; 2012 Raman-Mishishuma Award
- Scientific career
- Fields: Photothermal microspectroscopy; Laser spectroscopy
- Workplaces: Indian Institute of Science; Kanagawa Academy of Science and Technology; University of Groningen; Institute of Molecular Science; University of Tokyo; Imperial College of Science and Technology; Indian Institute of Science Education and Research, Bhopal

Siva Umapathy (born 10 June 1959) has been appointed as Honorary Professor of the Department of Inorganic and Physical Chemistry and also at the department of Instrumentation and Applied Physics by the Indian Institute of Science after his formal retirement in 2024. He was the Director (September 2018 to August 2023) of the Indian Institute of Science Education and Research, Bhopal (IISER). He is known for his studies of molecular dynamics using Raman spectroscopy. He is a fellow of the Royal Society of Chemistry and an elected fellow of the Indian National Science Academy (Indian National Science Academy), Indian Academy of Sciences and also The National Academy of Science of India. The Council of Scientific and Industrial Research, the apex agency of the Government of India for scientific research, awarded him the Shanti Swarup Bhatnagar Prize for Science and Technology, one of the highest Indian science awards, in 2004, for his contributions to chemical sciences.

== Biography ==
Umapathy, born on 10 June 1959 in Tanjavur in the south Indian state of Tamil Nadu, graduated in chemistry from the Kongunadu Arts and Science College of the University of Madras. He joined the PSG College of Technology from where he passed MSc in applied science in 1981. Subsequently, he moved to New Zealand for his doctoral studies and secured a PhD in physical chemistry from the University of Otago. Obtaining a research fellowship from Science and Engineering Research Board, he did his post-doctoral studies at the Rutherford Appleton Laboratory and the University of York. On his return to India, he joined the Indian Institute of Science where he served as Professor of the Department of Instrumentation and Applied Physics and the chair of the Department of Inorganic and Physical Chemistry. He headed the Laser Spectroscopy Group at the IISc where he hosts a number of doctoral and post-doctoral scholars. He has also served as a visiting faculty or fellow at various institutions such as the Kanagawa Academy of Science and Technology, University of Groningen, Institute of Molecular Science, University of Tokyo, Imperial College of Science and Technology and University of Nottingham. He also served as Director (September 2018 to August 2023) of the Indian Institute of Science Education and Research, Bhopal (IISER).

== Legacy ==
Umapathy's research is centered on Laser spectroscopy and he has carried out extensive work on molecular dynamics using Raman spectroscopy. His group also utilizes other spectroscopic techniques like infra red and is involved in the examination of the molecular structure of cells and tissues. Using Raman spectroscopic techniques, he has developed a method to identify biomarkers in cells which is estimated to assist in early cancer detection. He has published several peer-reviewed articles; ResearchGate, an online repository of science articles, has listed 164 of them.

== Awards and honors ==
Umapathy has been a holder of the Swarna Jayanthi Fellowship (2000) and the J. C. Bose National Fellowship of the Department of Science and Technology from 2010 to 2020 and again from Nov 2023 until 2027. He received the Young Investigator Award for the ICORS Conference at the University of South Carolina in 1989 and the Sir C. V. Raman Young Scientist Award from the Government of Karnataka in 2003. The Council of Scientific and Industrial Research awarded him the Shanti Swarup Bhatnagar Prize, one of the highest Indian science awards, in 2004. The same year, he received the Bronze Medal Medal of the Chemical Research Society of India. He is also a recipient of the Raman-Mishishuma Award of the India-Japan Science Promotion Council which he received in 2012. He is a fellow of the Royal Society of Chemistry and became an elected fellow of the Indian Academy of Sciences in 2003. He has delivered several award orations including the Subbarao Memorial Lecture at the Osmania University (1993) and many invited and plenary lectures.
