= Varun Aditya =

Indian wildlife photographer (born 1991)

- Born: 19 January 1991 (age 35); Coimbatore, Tamil Nadu, India
- Education: Coventry University
- Occupation: Wildlife photographer
- Known for: Assignments to National Geographic magazine
- Spouse: Sindhu (m. 2021)
- Website: birdspedia.org

Varun Aditya (Tamil language: வருண் ஆதித்தியா, born 19 January 1991) is an Indian wildlife photographer and environmentalist. He won the National Geographic Nature Photographer of the Year award in 2016. In addition to his photographic accomplishments, Varun Aditya engages in research about animals and nature through his photography.

== Career ==
Aditya received the opportunity to travel with American popular landscape photographer Michael Melford to Costa Rica and Panama after winning a National Geographic competition in 2013. In 2016, he won the first prize at the National Geographic Photographer of the Year in the Animal Portraits category for his photograph of a green vine snake, also called the Asian Vine Snake.

On 19 August 2019, coinciding with World Photography Day, Apple CEO Tim Cook posted an image on Twitter, captured by Aditya, of elephants with a double rainbow in the background.

== Awards and recognition ==
- National Geographic Nature Photographer of the Year award in 2016
