= Cognizant =

American information technology company

Cognizant Technology Solutions Corporation
- Type: Public
- Traded as: Nasdaq: CTSH (Class A); S&P 500 component
- ISIN: US1924461023
- Industry: Information technology; Consulting; Outsourcing
- Predecessor: Dun & Bradstreet
- Founded: 26 January 1994; 32 years ago in Chennai, Tamil Nadu, India
- Founders: Kumar Mahadeva
- Headquarters: Teaneck, New Jersey, U.S.
- Area served: Worldwide
- Key people: Ravi Kumar Singisetti (CEO)
- Revenue: ▲US$21.108 billion (2025)
- Operating income: ▲US$3.389 billion (2025)
- Net income: ▲US$2.230 billion (2025)
- Total assets: ▲US$20.692 billion (2025)
- Total equity: ▲US$15.015 billion (2025)
- Number of employees: 349,800 (September 2025)
- Website: cognizant.com

Cognizant Technology Solutions Corporation is an American domiciled Indian multinational information technology services and outsourcing company, headquartered in Teaneck, New Jersey. It was originally founded in Chennai, India, as an in-house technology unit of Dun & Bradstreet in 1994. After a series of corporate restructurings, the company went public in 1998.

Ravi Kumar Singisetti has been the CEO of the company since January 2023, replacing Brian Humphries.

== History ==
Cognizant was established in 1994 in Chennai, India, as Dun & Bradstreet Satyam Software (DBSS), a 76:24 joint venture between Dun & Bradstreet and Satyam Computers, with Kumar Mahadeva, and Srini Raju as the founding CEOs and MDs. It began with 50 employees in Chennai as Dun & Bradstreet's in-house technology unit focused on implementing large-scale IT projects for Dun & Bradstreet businesses. In 1996, the company started pursuing customers beyond Dun & Bradstreet.

In 1996, Dun & Bradstreet spun off several of its subsidiaries, including Erisco, IMS International, Nielsen Media Research, Pilot Software, Strategic Technologies and DBSS, to form a new company called Cognizant Corporation, headquartered in Chennai, India. Three months later, in 1997, DBSS renamed itself Cognizant Technology Solutions. In July 1997, Dun & Bradstreet bought Satyam's 24% stake in DBSS for $3.4 million. Headquarters were moved to the United States, and in March 1998, Kumar Mahadeva was named CEO. Operating as a division of the Cognizant Corporation, the company focused on Y2K-related projects and web development. In 1998, the parent company, Cognizant Corporation, split into two companies: IMS Health and Nielsen Media Research. After this restructuring, Cognizant Technology Solutions became a public subsidiary of IMS Health. In June 1998, IMS Health partially spun off the company, conducting an initial public offering of the Cognizant stock.

Cognizant's old logo

Cognizant's logo from 2018 until March 2022

In 2003, IMS Health sold its entire 56% stake in Cognizant, which instituted a poison pill provision to prevent hostile takeover attempts. Kumar Mahadeva resigned as the CEO in 2003, and was replaced by Lakshmi Narayanan. Gradually, the company's services portfolio expanded across the IT services landscape and into business process outsourcing (BPO) and business consulting. Lakshmi Narayanan was succeeded by Francisco D'Souza in 2006. In September 2014, Cognizant acquired healthcare IT services provider TriZetto Corp for $2.7 billion. Cognizant shares rose nearly 3 percent in pre-market trading. On 24 June 2015, the company signed a multimillion-dollar agreement with Escorts Group in India to help Escorts' businesses in digital transformation and modernize its operations across all business segments. On 30 June 2015, it partnered with Singapore-based supermarket retailer NTUC FairPrice to perform digital transformation in NTUC's business to improve personalized and consistent customer service across multiple channels.

On 1 April 2019, Francisco D'Souza was replaced by Brian Humphries as the CEO. In January 2022, Cognizant sold its acquisition Oy Samlink to Kyndryl and Mustache to DJE Holdings. In 2023, Ravi Kumar S was named as CEO of Cognizant. On 22 April 2024, Cognizant announced its partnership with Microsoft Corporation to extend its reach of Generative AI and Copilots, also to enhance experiences of employee and speed up their cross-industry innovation.

== Acquisitions ==
Company acquired	Country	Date	Business	Reference
3cloud	(United States) USA	January 2026	Cloud services	
Belcan	(United States) USA	June 2024	Digital Engineering	
Thirdera	(United States) USA	December 2023	An Elite-level ServiceNow partner	
Mobica	(United Kingdom) UK	January 2023	Automotive, Silicon, Internet of Things (IoT)	
Utegration	(United States) USA	December 2022	SAP capabilities for Energy & Utilities	
AustinCSI	(United States) USA	November 2022	Digital Transformation	
Onesource Virtual	(United States) USA	November 2022	Professional services and application management practices (Workday)	
DevBridge	(United States) USA	December 2021	Digital Engineering	
Hunter Technical Resources	(United States) USA	August 2021	Digital Engineering	
TQS Integration Ltd.	(United States) USA	July 2021	Data Analytics, Industry 4.0	
Cognizant Mobility	Germany	March 2021	Connected cars, IoT	
Magenic Technologies	(United States) USA	January 2021	Agile Software and Cloud Development, DevOps	
Linium	(United States) US	January 2021	ServiceNow	
Servian	Australia	January 2021	Data Analytics, Artificial Intelligence	
Inawisdom	(United Kingdom) UK	December 2020	AI, Machine Learning	
Bright Wolf	(United States) USA	October 2020	Internet of Things (IoT)	
10th Magnitude	(United States) USA	September 2020	Microsoft Azure	
Tin Roof Software	(United States) USA	August 2020	DevOps, Software Engineering	
New Signature	(United States) USA	July 2020	Microsoft Cloud Provider	
Collaborative Solutions	(United States) USA	May 2020	HR and Finance Cloud Provider	
Lev	(United States) USA	March 2020	Enterprise Digital Marketing	
EI-Technologies	France	February 2020	CRM Consulting	
Code Zero	(United States) USA	February 2020	CRM Consulting	
Contino	(United Kingdom) UK	October 2019	Digital Transformation (DevSecOps/Data/Cloud)	
Zenith Technologies	(Republic of Ireland) Ireland	June 2019	Life Sciences Automation	
Meritsoft	(Republic of Ireland) Ireland	March 2019	Fintech	
Oy Samlink	Finland	January 2019	Technology Provider	
Mustache	(United States) USA	December 2018	Digital Agency	
Softvision	(United States) USA	October 2018	Digital Solutions	
Advanced Technology Group	(United States) US	September 2018	CRM Consulting	
SaaSFocus	India	August 2018	CRM Consulting	
Hedera Consulting	Belgium	May 2018	Consulting	
Bolder Healthcare Solutions	(United States) US	March 2018	Health Care IT	
Zone	(United Kingdom) UK	October 2017	Digital Agency	
Netcentric	Switzerland	October 2017	Digital Marketing	
T2C | Top Tier Consulting	(United States) USA	September 2017	Healthcare Consulting	
TMG Health	(United States) USA	June 2017	Health Care IT	
BrilliantService	Japan	March 2017	Intelligent Products, Internet of things	
Adaptra	Australia	December 2016	Insurance Consulting, Project Management	
Nova IT	Australia	December 2016	HR Services	
KIS Information Services (KIS)	Germany	December 2016	IT Services	
Mirabeau BV	Netherlands	November 2016	Digital Marketing, Customer Experience	
Frontica Business Solutions	Norway	October 2016	IT Services & Solutions	
Idea Couture	Canada	July 2016	Digital Services (Innovation and Experience Design)	
Heliocentric	El Salvador	May 2016	BPO Services	
Quick Left Inc.	(United States) USA	May 2016	Mobile & Web Apps	
ReD Associates	Denmark	April 2016	Market Research	
KBACE Technologies	(United States) USA	January 2016	Oracle Cloud, ERP	
Storebrand Baltic	Lithuania	Nov 2015	Lithuanian IT unit of Norway's Storebrand	
CNO Financial Group (India)	India	Feb 2015	IT Application Development	
Odecee	Australia	November 2014	IT, Consulting and BPO services	
Cadient Group	(United States) USA	October 2014	Digital Healthcare	
TriZetto Corp	(United States) USA	September 2014	Healthcare Payer Software, Provider Revenue Cycle Software (Consulting, Software, BPO, Hosting)	
itaas Interactive TV Solutions	(United States) USA	April 2014	Digital Video services	
ValueSource Technologies	India	October 2013	IT services	
Equinox Consulting	France	October 2013	Financial Services Consulting Firm	
SourceNet Solutions	(United States) US	May 2013	BPS for Finance & Accounting	
QBridge	(United States) US	Jan 2013	Marketing Automation	
C1 group (6 companies)	Germany	December 2012	btconsult GmbH [process and technology consulting, SAP]; C:1 Solutions GmbH [consulting and enterprise solutions: SAP, BPM, ECM, ERM]; psc Management Consulting GmbH [process and technology consulting]; C:1 SetCon GmbH [software engineering and testing]; Enterprise Services AG [a Swiss company focused on process and IT consulting]; C:1 Holding GmbH	
Medicall	Philippines	November 2012	Medical Transcription	
Excellence Data Research	India	August 2012	Market Research	
ING US	(United States) USA	June 2012	Technology	
Zaffera	(United States) USA	September 2011	SAP Consulting	
CoreLogic India	India	July 2011	Mortgage processing	
Galileo Performance	France	June 2010	Consulting related to the measurement, management and continuous optimization of IT system performance	
PIPC Group	(United Kingdom) UK	May 2010	Program & Project Management Consulting	
UBS India Service Center	India	October 2009	Business process outsourcing, industry research	
Pepperweed Advisors	(United States) USA	September 2009	Business Consulting, Program Management	
Invensys Rail R&D India & Invensys Operations Managed R&D Center India	India	July 2009	Product Research & Engineering, Manufacturing	
Active Intelligence	Canada	February 2009	Consulting, implementation and support services for Oracle Retail Merchandising, Planning and Optimization suite	
Strategic Vision Consulting	(United States) USA	June 2008	Business Consulting for media and entertainment companies	
T-Systems India	Germany	March 2008	System Integration	
marketRx	(United States) USA	November 2007	Life Sciences Analytics, healthcare KPO	
AimNet	(United States) USA	September 2006	IT infrastructure services	
Fathom Consulting	Canada	April 2005	Telecom & Automotive IT Services	
Ygyan Consulting	India	February 2004	SAP consulting	
Infopulse	Netherlands	December 2003	IT services	
Aces International	(United States) USA	April 2003	Siebel CRM consulting	
American Express Travel-related Services account from Silverline Technologies	(United States) USA	Sep 2002	Financial services	
UnitedHealthcare Ireland Limited	(Republic of Ireland) Ireland	June 2002	Healthcare services (a subsidiary of the UnitedHealth Group)	

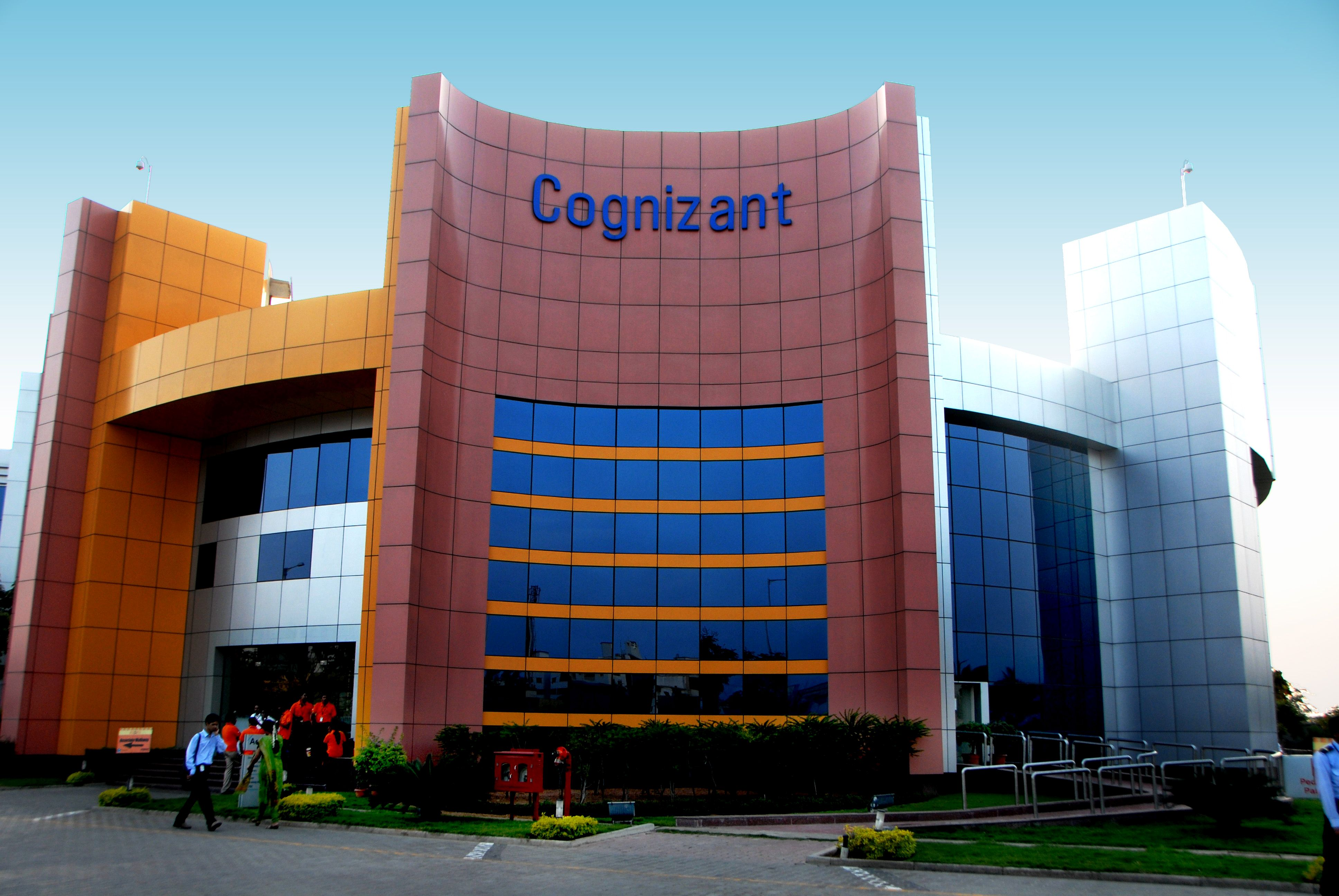
Cognizant's original corporate headquarters in Chennai, now an offshore delivery center

== Operations ==
=== Regions ===
As of December 2023, the company had over 347,700 employees globally, of which about 254,000 were in India across 13 cities. By 2024, Cognizant's largest employee bases were in Chennai and Hyderabad, each with more than 50,000 employees, followed by Bengaluru with nearly 40,000. The company has local, regional, and global delivery centers in other countries like the UK, Australia, Hungary, Netherlands, Spain, China, Philippines, Canada, Brazil, Argentina, Mexico, Costa Rica.

=== Business units ===
Cognizant is organized into several verticals and horizontal units. The vertical units focus on specific industries such as Banking & Financial Services, Insurance, Healthcare, Manufacturing and Retail. The horizontal units focus on specific technologies or process areas such as Analytics, mobile computing, BPO and Testing. Both horizontal and vertical units have business consultants, who form the organization-wide Cognizant Consulting team together. Cognizant is among the largest recruiters of MBAs in the industry; they are involved in business development and business analysis for IT services projects.

== Corporate affairs ==
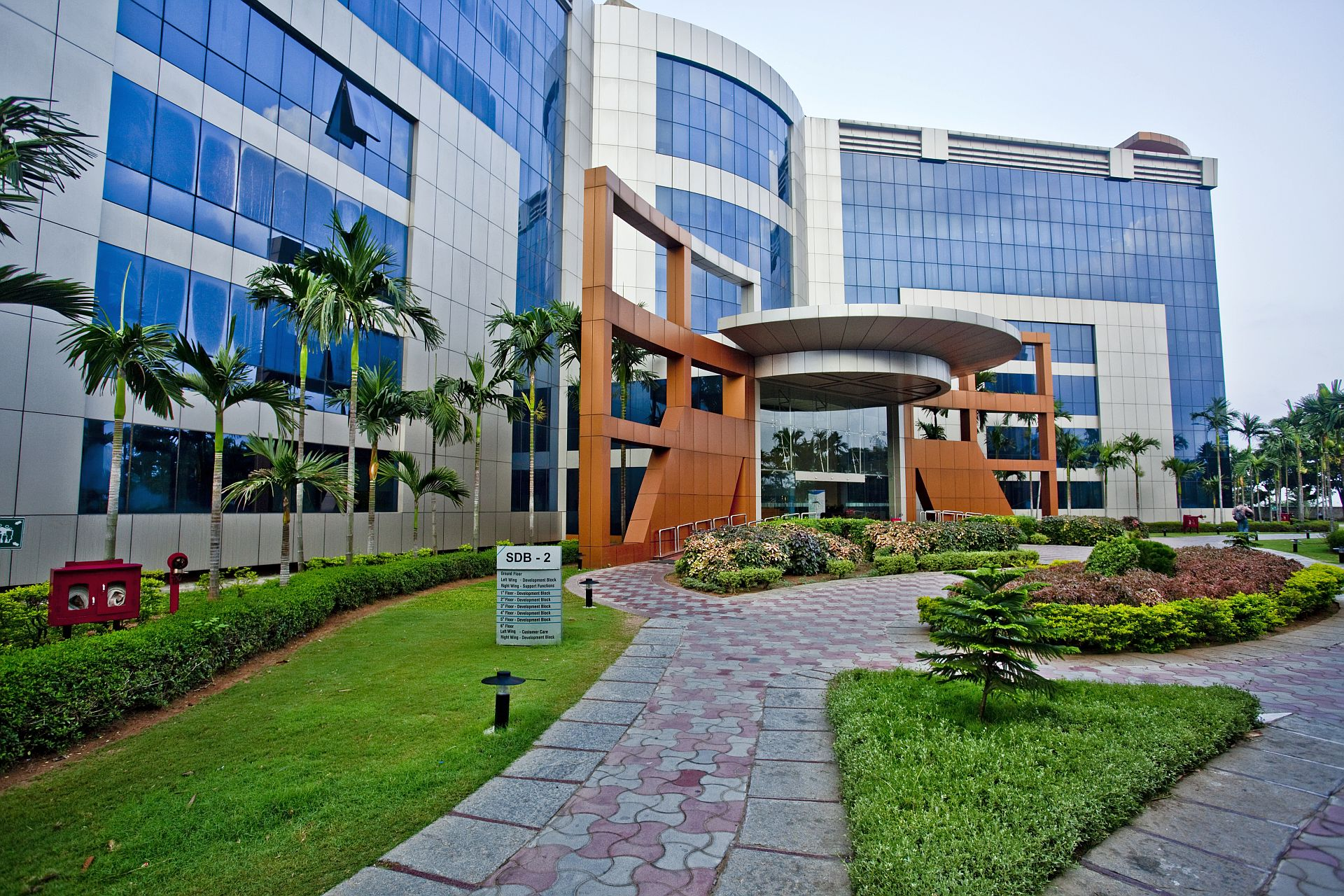
Cognizant's Delivery Center in Chennai

=== Management ===
Cognizant is led by Ravi Kumar S (CEO) as of 12 January 2023. Jatin Dalal (CFO) a, Surya Gummadi and Rajesh Nambiar (President, Digital Business & Technology) are some of the others in the leadership team. On 1 April 2019, Francisco D'Souza was replaced by Brian Humphries as the CEO. On 12 January 2023, Brian Humphries was replaced by former Infosys President, Ravi Kumar Singisetti as the CEO.

=== Finance ===
Year	Fortune 500 rank
2024	213
2023	208
2022	194
2021	185
2020	194
2019	193
2018	195
2017	205
2016	230
2015	288
2014	308
2013	352
2012	398
2011	484

Cognizant was listed on NASDAQ in 1998, and added to the NASDAQ-100 Index in 2004. After the close of trading on 16 November 2006, Cognizant moved from the mid cap S&P 400 to the S&P 500. Cognizant became a Fortune 500 company in 2011.

=== Corporate social responsibility ===
Cognizant's philanthropic and corporate social responsibility (CSR) initiatives are conducted through the Cognizant employees for the financial and administrative support of the Cognizant Foundation. Registered in March 2005 as a "Charitable Company" under the Indian Companies Act, the Cognizant Foundation aims to help "unprivileged members of society gain access to quality education and healthcare by providing financial and technical support; designing and implementing educational and healthcare improvement programs; and partnering with Non-Government Organizations (NGOs), educational institutions, healthcare institutions, government agencies and corporations".

Cognizant has a grassroots corporate social responsibility project called Outreach, through which the volunteer employees lend their expertise for devising skill-building and workforce programs to improve the operations of NGOs.

== Awards and recognition ==
Cognizant has received recognition from industry and professional organizations for its technology and business practices. In 2025, the company was named Global System Integrator Innovation Partner of the Year at the Qlik Global Partner Awards. In 2026, Cognizant became the first global IT service company to achieve ISO/IEC 42001:2023 Accredited Certification for Artificial Intelligence Management Systems. That year, its AI Builder approach to enterprise transformation received the Blueprint Pioneer Award at PegaWorld 2026. Cognizant was also named one of the World's Most Ethical Companies by Ethisphere in 2026, marking the second consecutive year it received the recognition.

== Sponsorships ==
In January 2021, the newly rebranded Aston Martin Formula One team announced Cognizant as their title sponsor for the 2021 Formula One World Championship and beyond. In February 2021, Cognizant signed a sponsorship deal with the PGA TOUR and LPGA Tour to become a Global Partner of the Presidents Cup and a title partner of the LPGA Tour’s Founders Cup. Later in the same year, in April, Cognizant signed an agreement to be SailGP's digital transformation partner. In June, Cognizant also became the Presenting Partner of THE JOHN SHIPPEN Shoot-Out Inaugural Golf Event. As of 2024, Cognizant is also the title sponsor of Major League Cricket.

== Criticism and controversies ==
=== India ===
==== Bribery ====
Larsen & Toubro Ltd (L&T) paid $3.64 million in bribes to Indian government officials on behalf of Cognizant Technology Solutions Corp. to secure permits, ranging from environmental clearance to power. L&T has made illicit payments and Cognizant reimbursed the money by disguising it as compensation for cost overruns.

==== Companies Act violations ====
In March 2019, significant publicity was raised because Cognizant repetitively violated the directives of the Registrar of Companies. The Company "has moved [sic] the Madras High Court fearing possibility of criminal prosecution being launched against it by [the] Registrar of Companies for alleged violation of the provisions of the Companies Act of 2013 and the Companies (Appointment and Disqualification of Directors) Rules of 2014". One of those questions was as to why the company had not disclosed complete information on stock options of its parent holding company — CTS Corporation in the United States — having been given to the employees, including its directors, and the payments running to several hundred crores of rupees (approx US $40 million) having been paid to the parent company in the US towards stock compensating recharge.

==== Discrimination ====
In 2018, a race discrimination suit was brought: "Three former employees claim they were forced out of their jobs and replaced with 'less qualified' Indians after being poorly treated by their Indian supervisors and colleagues, given unjustifiably low performance ratings and denied promotions." Cognizant said it was "national origin" and not race. In a 2024 retrial, a jury found the company had discriminated and should pay damages.

==== Layoffs ====
200 senior executives above the director level were dismissed because they were not able to catch up with the latest technologies. The number of executives who were dismissed is unusually high and brings into question the ability of the company to catch up with the latest technologies.

In 2017, eight employees filed petitions with the labor department, complaining Cognizant forced them to resign as part of a performance-based review. The labor department closed the case in favor of employees and advised company management to give one more opportunity for the petitioners to prove themselves. At the time Cognizant had also rolled out a ‘voluntary separation program’ for directors, associate vice-presidents and senior VP's which compensated them with 6–9 months of their salary. In 2017, approximately 6000 Cognizant employees in Hyderabad/Bangalore/Chennai lost their job as a part of company's annual performance review process.

On July 1, 2023, Cognizant acquired the Microsoft/Nuance Dragon Ambient eXperience US medical scribes division. On January 8, 2024, Cognizant laid off over 700 of those US medical scribes and managers to migrate the US hospital accounts to their Indian scribes division in a rolling/tiered fashion with termination dates at the end of February and March 2024. In addition, approximately 40 of the US employees (thus not triggering the WARN Act, which stipulates a minimum of 50 employees) were terminated immediately on January 8, 2024, with only 1 month's severance pay instead of the 2 months' severance that would have been required by the WARN Act.

===== Project Leap layoffs =====
Under its "Project Leap" transformation initiative launched in April 2026, Cognizant initiated a major workforce restructuring to pivot toward an AI-led service delivery model. The program set aside an estimated $230 million to $320 million in restructuring charges—primarily for employee severance—to reallocate resources toward automated platforms, generative AI tools, and strategic infrastructure investments. While initial company guidance pointed to approximately 4,000 job cuts (~1% of its global workforce), industry analysts and financial reports indicated that total job eliminations could range between 12,000 and 15,000, primarily affecting mid-level management and routine delivery roles across its offshore hubs in India. Despite the headcount reductions, Cognizant maintained that Project Leap was designed to reshape its delivery pyramid rather than downsize the company entirely, continuing its annual intake of over 20,000 fresh university graduates to build a leaner, AI-native workforce.

==== Tax evasion ====
The Income Tax department has frozen Cognizant Technology Solutions Corp's bank accounts and deposits in Chennai and Mumbai for allegedly evading a dividend distribution tax (DDT). A Cognizant spokesman confirmed the report and said in a statement that a court has instructed the tax department not to take further action pending further hearings. Cognizant failed to pay the tax of more than 25 billion rupees ($385 million) in the 2016–17 financial year, according to The Hindu, citing officials from the tax department. The court asked the company to deposit 15 percent of the disputed tax, amounting to 4.9 billion rupees ($75 million) as security deposit till it decides on the case.

=== Ireland ===
==== Working conditions ====
In February 2018 the UK and Irish press expressed concerns about contractors employed by Cognizant in Dublin as part of the outsourcing contract with Google about the conditions of employment in relationship to compensation and basic employment allowances like sick leave.

=== United States ===
==== Corruption ====
In 2016, Cognizant announced that it was cooperating with US authorities in an investigation related to the Foreign Corrupt Practices Act, and carrying out its own probe to determine whether some payments made in India breached the law. The company also said President Gordon Coburn had resigned and would be replaced by Rajeev Mehta.

==== Crawford & Company lawsuit ====
Cognizant has been sued by Crawford & Company, the US-based independent providers of insurance claims-handling services, for alleged breach of contract. Cognizant had been mandated by Crawford to implement PeopleSoft Financials software as part of an ERP project called Project Atlas that it was critical to Crawford's operations. Project Atlas included components for both internal operations and client-facing services.

==== Wage theft and H-1B visa violations ====
Cognizant leads the ranks of companies receiving H-1B visas from the United States. The company has been steadily increasing its U.S. work force. In January 2011, the company announced plans to expand its U.S. delivery centers, including a new 1,000-person (0.4% of worldwide workforce) facility in Phoenix, Arizona.

In 2009, an investigation by the US Department of Labor (DoL) found Cognizant in violation of the H-1B provisions of the Immigration and Nationality Administrative Act. The DoL discovered that the company had stolen wages and benefits from 67 of its workers, for which they demanded they repay $509,607 in back wages. Joseph Petrecca, the director of the Wage and Hour Division's Northern New Jersey District Office noted that the company took immediate steps to correct the violations, saying the "level of cooperation sets a standard for others in the industry".

In 2016, the company was the subject of a lawsuit by workers for Walt Disney World who said workers from India were brought into the United States on H-1B visas in order to replace them. However, in October 2016, federal Judge Gregory A. Presnel of the United States District Court in Orlando dismissed the lawsuits, stating "none of the allegedly false statements put at issue in the complaint are adequate."

Cognizant was also required to pay $5.7 million in back pay and fines in a U.S. District Court ruling for a class action lawsuit. The lawsuit claimed that Cognizant did not provide quality assurance analysts the full value of their overtime pay.

In September 2026, the US government suspended Permanent Labor Certification (or PERM) filings by Cognizant due to alleged fraud and misuse.

==== Toxic workplace, sexual harassment and mental health issues ====
In February 2019, an investigative report by The Verge described poor working conditions in Cognizant's Phoenix, Arizona, office. Cognizant employees tasked with content moderation for Facebook developed mental health issues, including post-traumatic stress disorder, as a result of exposure to graphic violence, hate speech, and conspiracy theories in the videos they were instructed to evaluate. Moderators at the Phoenix office reported drug abuse, alcohol abuse, and sexual intercourse in the workplace, and feared retaliation from terminated workers who threatened to harm them. In response, a Cognizant representative stated the company would examine the issues in the report.

The Verge published a follow-up investigation of Cognizant's Tampa, Florida, office in June 2019. Employees in the Tampa location described working conditions that were worse than the conditions in the Phoenix office. Content moderator Keith Utley suffered a heart attack while working for Cognizant in March 2018 and died in a hospital; the Tampa office lacked an on-site defibrillator. Moderators were required to sign non-disclosure agreements with Cognizant to obtain the job, although three former workers broke the agreements to provide information to The Verge. In the Tampa office, workers reported bed bugs, unsanitary work conditions, inadequate mental health resources, sexual harassment, workplace violence, and theft. As a result of exposure to videos depicting graphic violence, animal abuse, and child sexual abuse, some employees developed psychological trauma and posttraumatic stress disorder. Cognizant sanitized the office before The Verge's visit, a practice the publication described as a "dog-and-pony-show phenomenon". In response to negative coverage related to its content moderation contracts, a Facebook director indicated that Facebook is in the process of developing a "global resiliency team" that would assist its contractors.

On October 30, 2019, Cognizant announced that it would phase out a portion of its content moderation contracts in 2020.

== See also ==
- Disney collusion litigation
- Tech companies in the New York City metropolitan region
