= Ariane Passenger Payload Experiment =

Communication satellite

- Mission type: Communications
- Operator: EADS Astrium
- COSPAR ID: 1981-057B
- SATCAT no.: 12545
- Mission duration: 2 years, 3 months

Spacecraft properties
- Manufacturer: ISRO
- Launch mass: 350 kilograms (770 lb)

Start of mission
- Launch date: 19 June 1981
- Rocket: Ariane 1
- Launch site: Kourou ELA-1

End of mission
- Deactivated: 19 September 1983

Orbital parameters
- Reference system: Geocentric
- Regime: Geostationary
- Longitude: 102° East

The Ariane Passenger Payload Experiment (APPLE) was India's first experimental three-axis-stabilised geostationary communications satellite, developed by the Indian Space Research Organisation. Launched on 19 June 1981 aboard an Ariane 1 rocket from Kourou, French Guiana, it was positioned at 102° east longitude on 16 July. The satellite served as a test platform for India's telecommunications space relay infrastructure and conducted communication experiments, including television programme relays and radio networking. Despite the failure of one solar panel to deploy, APPLE remained in service until 19 September 1983.

== History ==
The Ariane Passenger PayLoad Experiment (APPLE), was an experimental communication satellite with a C-Band transponder launched by the Indian Space Research Organisation on June 19, 1981, by Ariane, a launch vehicle of the European Space Agency (ESA) from Centre Spatial Guyanais near Kourou in French Guiana.

APPLE was India's first three-axis stabilised experimental Geostationary communication satellite. On July 16, 1981, the satellite was positioned at 102° E longitude. The 672 kg satellite served as testbed of the Indian telecommunications space relay infrastructure despite the failure of one solar panel to deploy. Solid-propellant based Apogee Boost Motor to circularize APPLE's orbit was derived from SLV-3 fourth stage.

It was used in several communication experiments including relay of TV programmes and radio networking. It was a cylindrical spacecraft measuring 1.2 m in diameter and 1.2 m high. Its payload consisted of two 6/4 GHz transponders connected to a 0.9 m diameter parabolic antenna. It went out of service on September 19, 1983. R. M. Vasagam was the project director of APPLE during 1977-1983.

APPLE shared its Ariane flight, the third development launch (L03) on 19 June 1981, with the European weather satellite Meteosat 2 and the CAT-3 technology payload. Its launch mass was about 670 kg, but its mass at the start of its life in orbit was about 350 kg. It had two deployable solar arrays and batteries, and its apogee motor was designated S-0.26. During development the spacecraft was placed on a bullock cart to provide a non-magnetic environment for antenna tests in an open field, in order to fix a telemetry, tracking and command link problem caused by an impedance-matching fault.

== Spacifications ==
APPLE (Specifications)
Mission	Experimental geostationary communication
Weight	670 kg
Onboard Power	210 watts
Payload	C-band transponders (Two)
Launch Date	June 19, 1981
Launch Vehicle	Ariane -1(V-3)
Orbit	Geosynchronous
Mission life	Two years

== See also ==
- List of Indian satellites
