= Lanco Infratech =

Insolvent Indian conglomerate

- Industry: Energy; Infrastructure
- Founded: 2006
- Defunct: 2017
- Headquarters: Hyderabad, India
- Key people: Lagadapati Madhusudhan; Lagadapati Rajagopal
- Products: Natural gas; Real estate; Electricity generation; Electricity distribution

Lanco Infratech (Lagadapati Amarappa Naidu and Company Infratech) was a large Indian conglomerate that became insolvent in 2017. It was involved in construction, power, real estate, and several other segments. One of the first Independent Power Producers (IPP) in India, in 2011 it became the largest private power provider in India.

== History ==
Lanco was founded by Lagadapati Amarappa Naidu and his nephew Lagadapati Rajagopal, who was a member of 15th Lok Sabha representing Vijayawada from Indian National Congress. Lanco Infratech was created in 2006 to consolidate the 1960-founded Lanco Group's diverse operations under one brand. Initial growth was driven by large contracts primarily in construction. Later, other infrastructure areas such as power generation, transportation were also added. In 2017 the company became insolvent.

== Former major operational power plants ==
- 2 × 300 MW Lanco Amarkantak Power Limited – Two units of 300 MW commissioned. In Korba District, Bilaspur Division, Chhattisgarh, India, South Asia, Asia, Earth
- 2 × 600 MW Lanco Anpara Power Limited – One unit of 600 MW commissioned in December 2011 and second unit of 600 MW was commissioned in January 2012. The power plant is located in Sonebhadra district of Uttar Pradesh.
- 2 × 600 MW Udupi Power Corp. Limited – Commissioned in 2012, the power plant is located in Udupi district, Karnataka. On 14 August 2014, Adani Power acquired the plant.
- 1466 MW Lanco Kondapalli Power Limited – Gas based Combined Cycle Power Plant located at Kondapalli Industrial Development Area near Vijayawada in Andhra Pradesh.
- 120 MW Lanco Tanjore Power Company Ltd – Gas based Combined Cycle Power Plant located at Karuppur village of Tanjore district, situated around 260 kilometres (160 mi) from Chennai, Tamil Nadu.
- 20 MW Hydro Power Plants

Major Power Projects under construction were:

- 2 × 660 MW extension of Lanco Amarkantak Power Limited
- 2 × 660 MW Lanco Vidarbha Thermal Power Limited
- 2 × 660 MW Lanco Babandh Power Limited
- 4 × 125 MW Lanco Teesta Hydro Power Pvt Ltd
- 2 × 76 MW Lanco Mandakini Hydro Energy Pvt Ltd
- Turnkey EPC for 100MW solar thermal project for KVK Energy in Rajasthan.
- Complete EPC for a 75 MW crystalline technology-based PhotoVoltaic solar power project in Dhule, Maharashtra, for Maharashtra State Power Generation Co Ltd Mahagenco.

== Real estate ==
In 2012, Lanco Infratech obtained around 100-acre (0.40 km^{2}) of land through bidding by the Andhra Pradesh government at ₹ 4.27 crore per acre for its ₹ 5,500 crore township project in Manikonda in Western Hyderabad.

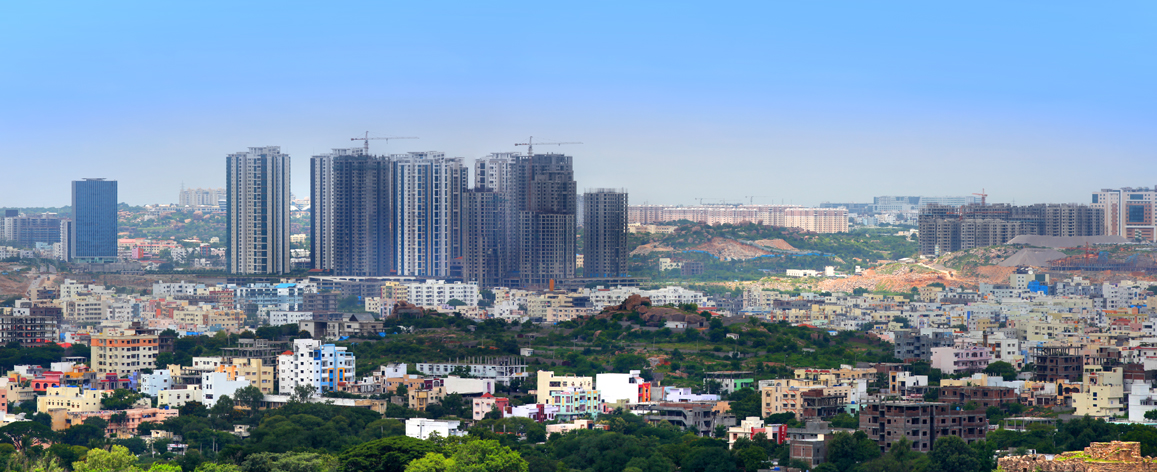
Panorama showing Manikonda and Lanco Hills under construction in 2012
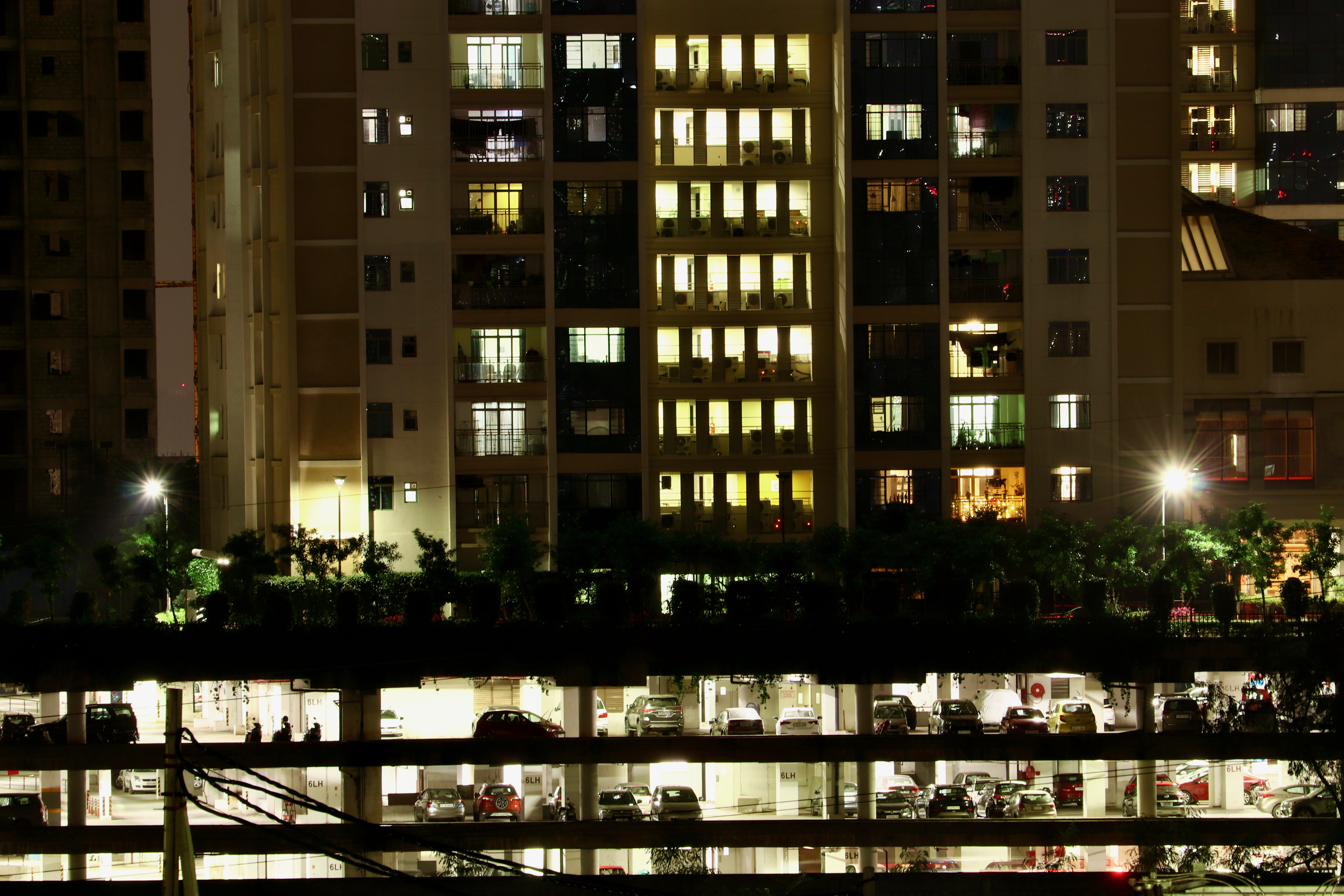
LANCO Hills High-rise complex

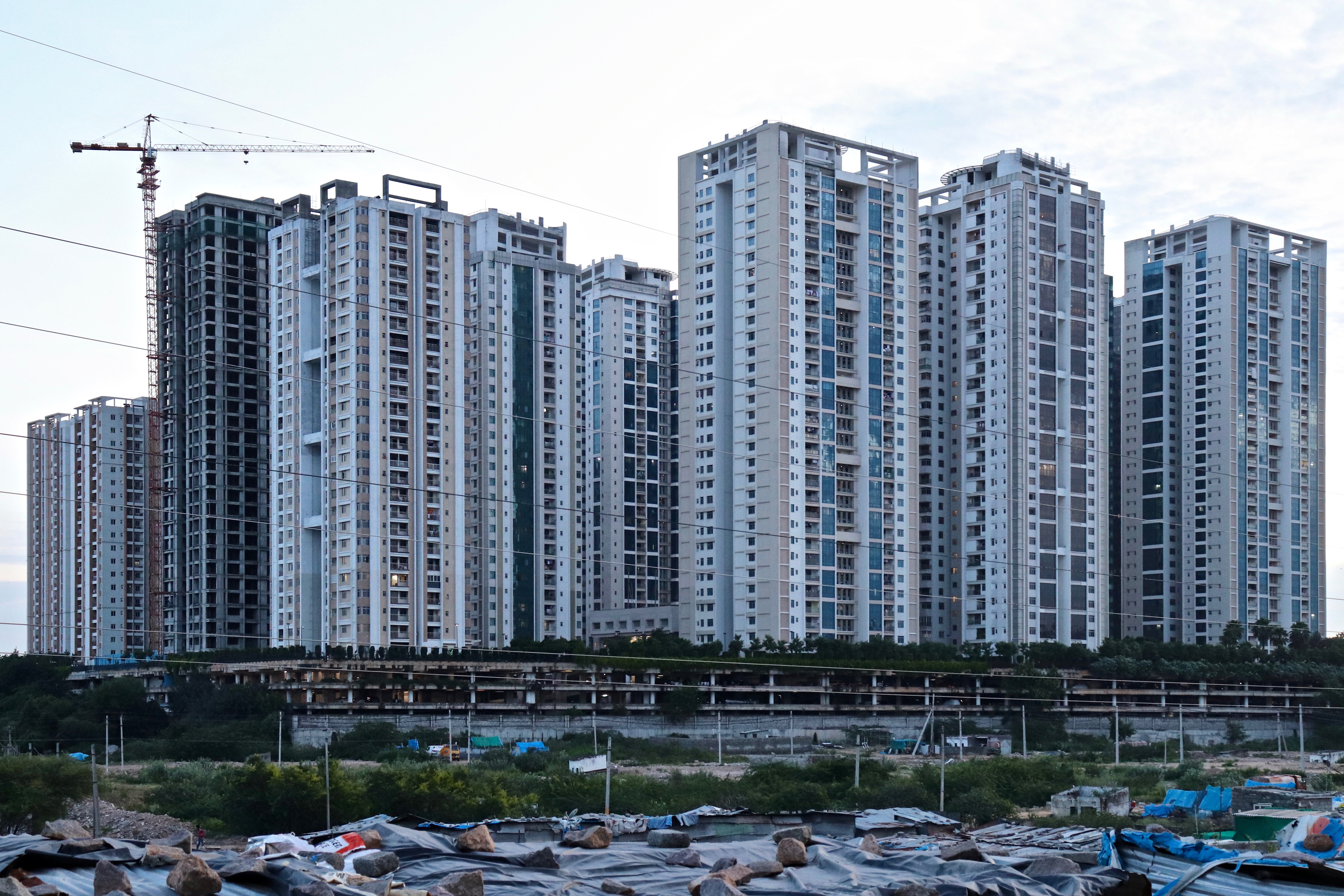
LANCO Hills captured from Chitrapuri colony road

== Debt restructuring ==
In December 2006, the company won a large contract citing collaboration with Singapore firm Globeleq. In 2007, after winning the bid for the 1000 MW Anpara-C power plant, Lanco requested that the power output be re-negotiated. Some competing firms protested since the re-negotiation made the initial bidding meaningless. However, Lanco managed to retain the Anpara project.

In June 2013, Lanco had won a contract for setting up two 300 MW power plants in Gujarat. However, the contract was cancelled in October 2013, when the company failed to put up the 10% guarantee required in the contract. By July 2013, the company had filed for debt restructuring, citing a business slowdown. In September, it was revealed that the company had reduced its workforce by nearly half.

Repeatedly tarnished by charges of corrupt practices the company ran into financial trouble and filed for corporate debt restructuring in July 2013. In late 2017 the company faced insolvency proceedings, with the National Company Law Tribunal suspending the board.

== Liquidation ==
In August 2018, Hyderabad bench of National Company Law Tribunal (NCLT) ordered the liquidation of Lanco Infratech.
