= Lakshmi Narayanan =

Indian businessman

- Born: 1953 (age 72–73)
- Education: PSG College of Technology,Bangalore University, Indian Institute of Science
- Occupations: Trustee, Governing Council
- Employer: Krea University
- Organization: Chennai Mathematical Institute
- Title: Chancellor
- Board member of: TVS Capital, Shriram Capital
- Awards: Distinguished Alumnus of IISc

Lakshmi Narayanan (born 1953) is the ex-vice chairman and ex-CEO of Cognizant and former Founder chairman of ICT Academy. He was the CEO and president of Cognizant until 2006.

== Biography ==
He has played a leading role in the global information technology industry for more than 25 years, managing divisions and business units in Europe, India and the United States. Since co-founding Cognizant Technologies in 1996, he has been instrumental in formulating the company's strategy and building and managing the organization's development centers in India, where he is based. A member of Cognizant's Board of Directors, Narayanan spends time traveling extensively in the U.S. and Europe to meet clients.

He also served as chairman on NASSCOM (National Association of Software and Service Companies) in 2007–08.

Narayanan began his career at Tata Consultancy Services, growing through the ranks from developer, to technologist, to program manager, to business leader. He was a regional head of Tata Consultancy Services in India when he joined Dun & Bradstreet as CTO. He holds a BSc and MS in science and electronics from Bangalore University and an PG Diploma from the Indian Institute of Science, Bangalore. He was also on the board of the National Skill Development Corporation, as a representative of NASSCOM.

Narayanan was awarded the Dataquest IT Person of the Year 2008 by the CyberMedia group's IT publication, Dataquest.
