= Madhusudhan Rao Lagadapati =

Indian businessman

Lagadapati Madhusudhan Rao
- Born: 1966 (age 59–60); Guntur, Andhra Pradesh
- Education: Wayne State University
- Known for: Lanco Infratech

Lagadapati Madhusudhan Rao (born 1966) is an Indian businessman and the Executive Chairman of Lanco Infratech, and the brother of Lagadapati Rajagopal. Forbes listed him as the 29th richest Indian with a net worth of $2.3 billion in 2009, but now he is a bank defaulter According to Forbes magazine, he stands at No. 29 among the richest persons in India. According to The Indian Wire he is the richest person in Hyderabad.
