= List of management consulting firms =

This list includes notable management consulting firms.

Management consulting indicates both the industry of, and the practice of, helping organizations improve their performance, primarily through the analysis of existing business problems and development of plans for improvement.

Organizations hire the services of management consultants for a number of reasons, including gaining external advice and access to the consultants' specialized expertise.

- Accenture
- Accountor
- AlixPartners
- Altran
- Alvarez and Marsal
- Aon
- Arthur D. Little
- Atkins
- Bain & Company
- BDO Consulting
- Bearingpoint
- Berkeley Research Group
- Booz Allen Hamilton
- Boston Consulting Group
- Bow & Arrow
- The Burke Group
- Capco
- Capgemini
- CGI
- CRA International
- Cognizant Technology Solutions
- Computer Sciences Corporation
- Cork Gully
- Corporate Executive Board
- Deloitte Consulting
- Detica
- EY
- EY-Parthenon
- FTI Consulting
- Grant Thornton
- Guidehouse
- Hay Group
- HCL Axon
- Hewitt Associates
- Hitachi Consulting
- HP Enterprise Services
- Huron Consulting Group
- IBM Global Business Services
- ICF International
- Infosys Consulting
- ITN Consulting
- Kearney
- Korn Ferry
- KPMG
- Kurt Salmon
- L.E.K. Consulting
- Logica
- Management Consulting Group
- Marsh McLennan
- McChrystal Group
- McGladrey
- McKinsey & Company
- Monitor Group
- Mott MacDonald
- OC&C Strategy Consultants
- Oliver Wyman
- PA Consulting Group
- Perficient
- Publicis Sapient
- PwC
- Protiviti
- PRTM
- QualPro
- Roland Berger
- Saint Consulting Group
- Schlumberger Business Consulting
- Sia Partners
- Simon-Kucher
- Slalom Consulting
- Strategy&
- Tata Consultancy Services
- West Monroe Partners
- Willis Towers Watson
- WTS Global
