= Employees First, Customers Second =

2010 book by Vineet Nayar

Employees First, Customers Second: Turning Conventional Management Upside Down
- Hardcover edition
- Author: Vineet Nayar
- Language: English, Spanish, Chinese, Japanese
- Subject: Management; Leadership; Organisational change
- Genre: Business, non-fiction
- Publisher: Harvard Business Review Press
- Publication date: 2010
- Publication place: United States
- Media type: Print (hardcover); eBook
- Pages: 208
- ISBN: 9781422139066 (hardcover)
- OCLC: 436026620

Employees First, Customers Second: Turning Conventional Management Upside Down is a management book written by Vineet Nayar, the former chief executive officer of HCL Technologies, and published by Harvard Business Review Press in 2010.

The book presents a management philosophy that prioritises frontline employees to enhance customer value, based on the Nayar's restructuring of HCLTech between 2005 and 2009 The book is a prescribed text at the Harvard University. It was included in a 2016 reading list published by London Business School and curated by Professor Nader Tavassoli. In 2010, the book appeared on The Tribune's non-fiction bestseller list.

== Summary ==
Employees First, Customers Second argues that companies create value at the point of interaction between employees and customers, and that management should therefore prioritize empowering frontline staff over maintaining traditional top-down control. Drawing on his experience as CEO of HCLTech, author describes a series of internal reforms he introduced at the company, including greater organizational transparency, an inverted management hierarchy, and the transfer of decision-making authority to customer-facing employees. One initiative described in the book, the "Mirror Mirror" exercise, involved structured internal reviews designed to build consensus around the need for change. The author presents these measures as incremental steps toward building trust and improving employee engagement, with the broader aim of driving customer satisfaction and financial performance.

== Reception ==
The book was reviewed in several academic and business publications. A book review published in 2012 by Thomas Bergen in The Washington Post described the book as "thought provoking, entertaining and enlightening", and recommended it to CEOs, managers and employees seeking organisational effectiveness.

Writing in the Journal of Organizational Change Management, Kenneth E. Long praised the book's "clear and direct style" and described it as a "straightforward narrative, told at a rapid pace, rich with insights," recommending it to both scholars and practitioners. Long compared Nayar's leadership style to that of Andy Grove and Jack Welch, and noted connections between the book's themes and established organizational theory, including Peter Senge's five disciplines of the learning organization. Long also noted that the book presents the transformation solely from the CEO's perspective, with limited treatment of failed initiatives, power dynamics, and the challenges of broader applicability.

A review in Vision: The Journal of Business Perspective described the book as "simple and absorbing" and as a credible account of how a price-competing IT services firm repositioned itself as a high-value service provider.

Jon Moulton in its review published on Financial Times described the book as "mostly written in an attractive, uncomplicated and direct style", although he noted that its ideas are not entirely unique. In a 2014 review, Christophe Lachnitt wrote that the book's management philosophy is "brilliant" but added that "the eponymous book is not".

Management author Tom Peters was quoted in The Times of India as stating that the author had "invented a whole new way of configuring and managing an enterprise". A review published in the Adarsh Journal of Management Research by Prof. Geetha V. Sharma of ICFAI Business School, Bangalore described the book as "full of anecdotes and original experiences," noting that Nayar presents the "Value Zone," reverse accountability, and transparency as the underlying themes of HCL Technologies' transformation.

In 2015, Gary Hamel of London Business School included Employees First, Customers Second in his list of '10 inspiring reads', calling it a work that questions conventional management hierarchies. In 2017, Liz Alton, writing for ADP's SPARK blog, listed the book as part of a "must-read books for HR Leaders" series.

The Employees First, Customers Second philosophy is analysed in a chapter published by Cambridge University Press in 2021, which examines it as an innovation model based on value co-creation through employees. In the United States, it appeared on Library Journal's Best Business Books of 2010 list.

The book was listed among non-fiction bestsellers by The Tribune in July 2010.
