= HCL =

HCL may refer to:

== Science and medicine ==
- Hairy cell leukemia, an uncommon and slowly progressing B cell leukemia
- Harvard Cyclotron Laboratory, from 1961 to 2002, a proton accelerator used for research and development
- Hollow-cathode lamp, a spectral line source used in physics and chemistry
- Hydrochloric acid, a solution of hydrogen chloride in water
- Hydrochloride, the salt of hydrochloric acid and an organic base
- Hydrogen chloride, chemical formula HCl
- Hypomania Checklist, a questionnaire used to screen for hypomania and bipolar spectrum disorders
- HCL color space, a color space model designed to accord with human perception of color

== Computing ==
- Hardware compatibility list
- HashiCorp Configuration Language, a configuration language authored by HashiCorp, used by cloud infrastructure automation tools, such as Terraform.

== Organizations ==
- HCL Group

- HCLTech, an IT outsourcing firm based in Noida, India
- HCL Axon, a subsidiary of HCL Technologies

- Hennepin County Library
- Hindustan Cables Limited, an Indian cable manufacturer
- Harvard College Library
- HC Lugano, a Swiss professional ice hockey team based in Lugano
- Honolulu Control Facility, an air traffic control facility
- Horizon Coach Lines, an American bus company
- HC Leipzig, German handball club

== See also ==
- HCI (disambiguation)
