= Sampark Foundation =

Indian non-profit organization

- Formation: 2005; 21 years ago
- Founder: Vineet Nayar; Anupama Nayar; Janak Nayar
- Founded at: Noida, Uttar Pradesh, India
- Type: Non-profit organization
- Purpose: Improving primary education in government schools
- Headquarters: Noida, India
- Region served: Himachal Pradesh, Uttarakhand, Uttar Pradesh, Haryana, Rajasthan, Chhattisgarh, Maharashtra, Jharkhand
- Methods: Partnerships with state governments, Providing teacher training, educational programs
- Fields: Education
- Chairman: Vineet Nayar
- President: K. Rajeswara Rao
- Endowment: $100 million
- Website: www.samparkfoundation.org

Sampark Foundation is a non-profit organization based in Noida, Uttar Pradesh, India, founded in 2005. The foundation focuses on improving the quality of primary education in government schools across underprivileged and rural areas in India. It operates in eight states, including Himachal Pradesh, Uttarakhand, Uttar Pradesh, Haryana, Rajasthan, Chhattisgarh, Maharashtra, and Jharkhand, working with state governments to reach children and provide training for government school teachers. The foundation has been the subject of two Harvard Business School case studies.

== History ==
The Sampark Foundation was established in 2005 by Vineet Nayar, the former CEO of HCL Technologies, along with his wife, Anupama Nayar, and his mother, Janak Nayar.

The foundation was created to address the educational challenges faced by children in rural India, particularly focusing on improving proficiency in mathematics and English. It operates with a $100 million endowment, which is expected to expire in 2025. Following this period, the foundation intends to transition its programs to government stakeholders to ensure the sustainability of its initiatives.

In 2013, the Sampark Foundation undertook two major projects related to water conservation and agricultural assistance in rural India. In Tamil Nadu, the foundation launched a water awareness program in 19 villages with low water tables, aiming to educate farmers on sustainable water management practices. In Maharashtra, near the drought-affected sugarcane-growing region of Baramati, Sampark trained farmers in cultivating alternative, drought-resistant crops. By working with 10,000 farmers and collaborating with scientists to improve soil health, the foundation contributed to enhancing the livelihoods of local communities.

Subsequently, the organization shifted its focus entirely to education. In 2014, it partnered with the states of Chhattisgarh and Uttarakhand to implement its programs in 33,000 and 10,000 schools, respectively, over three phases. In 2016, the foundation tied up with the Government of Chhattisgarh to support the state's Sarva Shiksha Abhiyan (SSA) by investing ₹60 crore in the Sampark Smart Class Programme for government schools. In August 2022, the Sampark Foundation partnered with the Rajasthan Council of School Education (RCSE) to sign a five-year agreement to enhance education quality in Rajasthan, with a ₹40 crore investment. The foundation also invested ₹40 crores each in Uttar Pradesh, and Uttarakhand.

== Programs ==
=== Sampark Smart Shala ===
Sampark Smart Shala (SSS) program was launched in 2015 with the purpose to transform government schools in rural India into "smart schools" by providing them with the necessary infrastructure, resources, and teacher training. The SSS kit comprises 16 components including a rechargeable audio device, a voice mascot named Sampark Didi, toys, stories, board games, multimedia workbooks, and Sampark mobile app and teacher training modules combined with monitoring in collaboration with the State Governments.

The Sampark Smart Shala - Smart Block program improves government primary schools by converting them into smart schools, one block at a time, through the installation of Sampark TVs equipped with educational content and providing teacher training in pedagogical methods. The program has been implemented in several Indian states. In February 2023, Maharashtra's Education Minister Deepak Vasant Kesarkar inaugurated the program in Sindhudurg. Subsequently, the program was launched in Uttarakhand by Chief Minister Pushkar Singh Dhami in May 2023 and in Uttar Pradesh by CM Yogi Adityanath in July 2023.

The foundation applied "frugal innovation" principles to ensure its interventions were both cost-effective and scalable, with a cost of $1 per child annually.

=== Sampark TV ===
Sampark TV is a Smart TV-based learning device launched by the foundation to enhance education in rural India. In 2022, the foundation rolled out Sampark TV in 25,000 government schools.

=== Sampark Didi ===
One of the key programs initiated by Sampark Foundation is the Sampark Didi, an audio-based learning device introduced in 2016. The device, which is pre-loaded with educational content, focuses on teaching basic English and mathematics concepts through stories and interactive lessons. The lessons are designed to be accessible to children in rural areas, where formal schooling is often limited.

=== Baithak ===
In April 2020, the foundation launched a mobile application called Baithak in response to the COVID-19 pandemic to educate children across India in states that have partnered with the foundation, including Himachal Pradesh, Haryana, Uttar Pradesh, Chhattisgarh, Jharkhand, and Uttarakhand. The app is designed for children aged 5 to 15, up to class 8, and engages approximately 200,000 teachers who contribute to content creation. It enables users to download educational materials for offline access and incorporates various technologies, including artificial intelligence (AI), bots, video compression, analytics engines, and visualization tools to enhance the learning experience. The app was developed with an investment of ₹10 crores from Vineet and Anupama Nayar.

== Impact ==
In 2017, a case study titled Sampark Foundation: Transforming Primary Education in India, conducted by V. Kasturi Rangan and Shweta Bagai, was published by Harvard Business School. The study examined Sampark Foundation's innovative, cost-efficient approach to improving primary education, which had reached over 3 million children across India by that time.

In 2020, Harvard Business School published a second case study on Sampark Foundation, titled Vineet Nayar and Sampark Foundation: Frugal Innovation at Scale (A), authored by Linda A. Hill and Emily Tedards. The study detailed Sampark Foundation's "Teachers First" model, which, by 2019, had reached over 7 million children and 200,000 teachers across 90,000 schools through a frugal and scalable approach. It also discussed plans to extend the program to 50 million children by adopting a "Digital First" strategy to integrate technology into education.

As of July 2024, smart classrooms were introduced in over 6,600 government schools in Haryana, with reported improvements in learning outcomes of 35% to 40%.

== Leadership ==
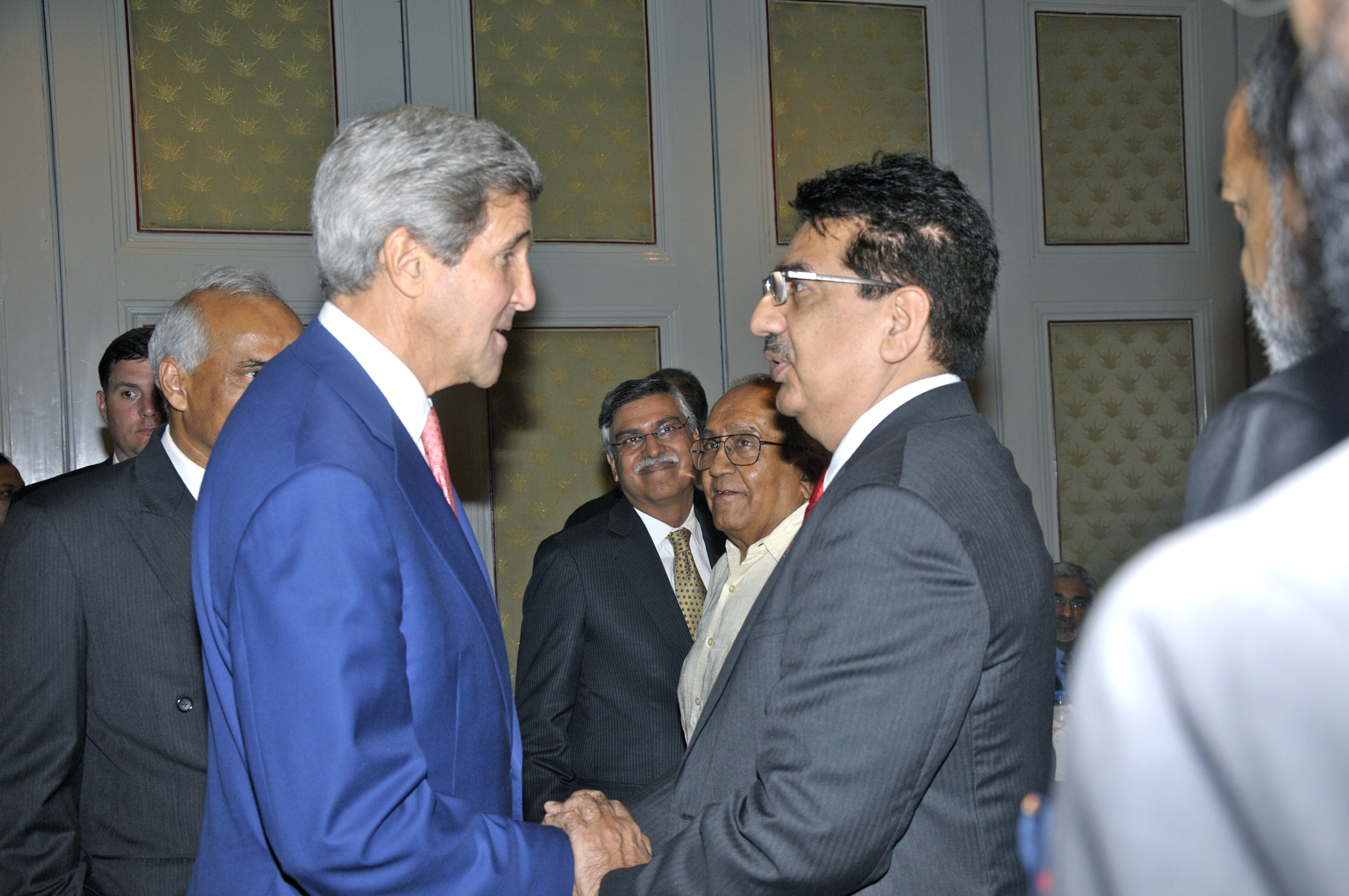
U.S. Secretary of State John Kerry meets Vineet Nayar of the Sampark Foundation at a Brookings India Luncheon in New Delhi, India, on July 31, 2014

Vineet Nayar currently serves as the chairman of the organization. In November 2022, K. Rajeswara Rao, former Special Secretary of NITI Aayog, was appointed as the president of the foundation.

== Awards and recognition ==
- Vineet Nayar and Anupama Nayar, founders of Sampark Foundation, were included in Forbes Asia's "Heroes of Philanthropy" list in 2016 for their contributions to education through the foundation.
- In February 2020, foundation's Sampark Smart Shala program was selected as one of the Top 100 entries in the John D. and Catherine T. MacArthur Foundation's 100 & Change Competition.
- In April 2024, the foundation received the 'Great Place to Work' certification and was listed among the 'Best NGOs to Work For'.
- In December 2024, Sampark Foundation received the 'Most Impactful NGO of the Year' award at the Indian CSR Awards.
