= Vineet Nayar =

Businessman

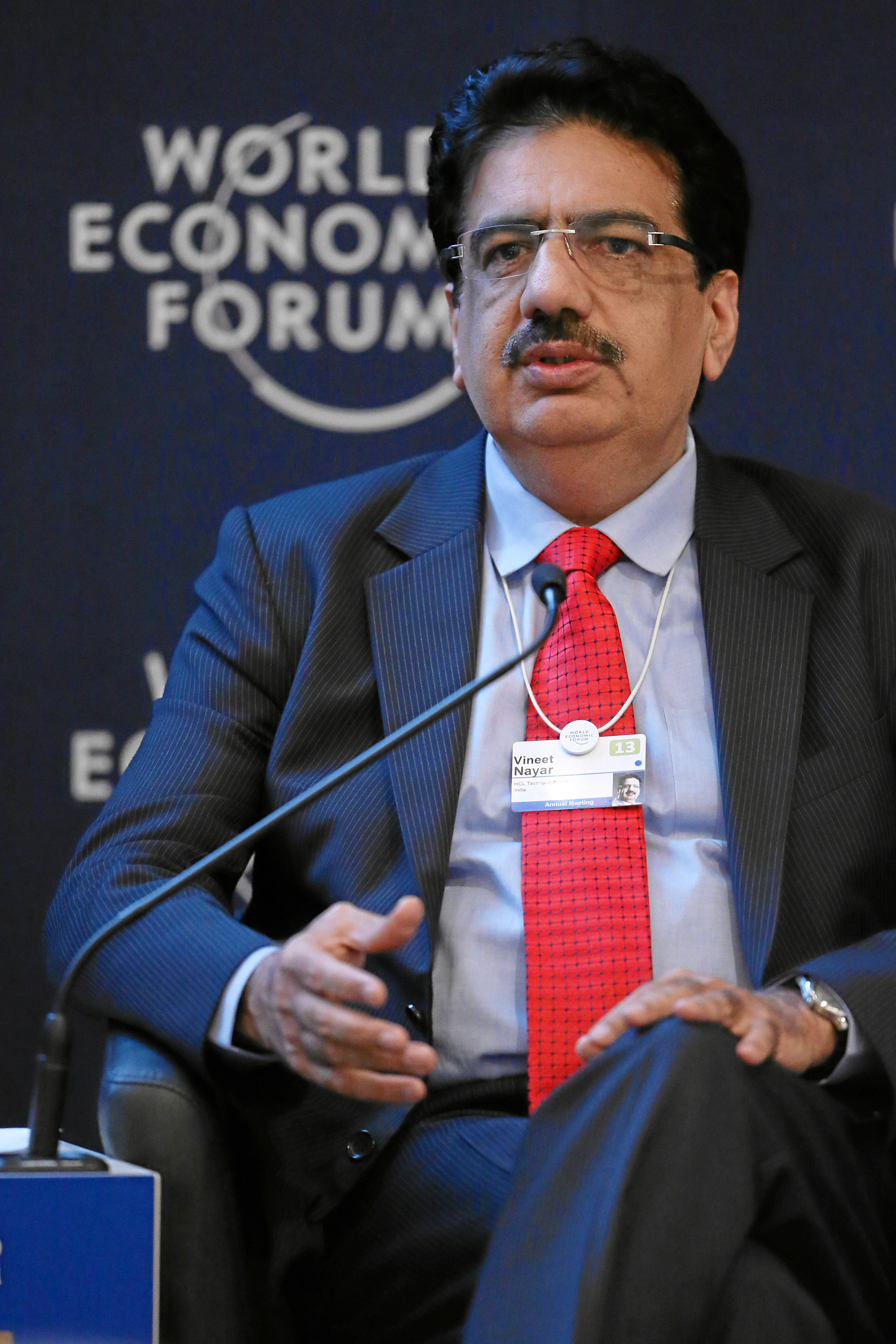
- Vineet Nayar at the 2013 World Economic Forum in Davos
- Born: 1962 (age 63–64); Pantnagar, Uttarakhand, India
- Education: B.Tech, MBA
- Alma mater: G. B. Pant University of Agriculture and Technology; XLRI – Xavier School of Management
- Occupations: Business executive, Entrepreneur, Author, Philanthropist
- Years active: 1985 - present
- Employer: HCL Technologies (1985―2013)
- Known for: Chairman of Sampark Foundation, Former Vice Chairman and CEO of HCL Technologies
- Notable work: Employees First, Customers Second: Turning Conventional Management Upside Down (2010)
- Spouse: Anupama Nayar
- Website: www.vineetnayar.com

Vineet Nayar (born 1962) is an Indian businessperson, author, and philanthropist. He served as the chief executive officer of HCL Technologies from 2007 to 2013 and is currently the founder and chairman of the Sampark Foundation, a non-profit organization he established in 2005. Nayar is also the author of the best-selling book, Employees First, Customers Second: Turning Conventional Management Upside Down, published by Harvard Business Review Press in 2010.

He was listed among the Thinkers50 influential management thinkers in 2011 and featured in Forbes Asia's "Heroes of Philanthropy" list in both 2013 and 2016.

== Early life and education ==
Nayar was born in Pantnagar, Uttarakhand, where he spent his early years. He completed his schooling at Campus School, Pantnagar. He obtained a Bachelor of Technology degree in Mechanical engineering from the College of Technology, Pantnagar at G. B. Pant University of Agriculture and Technology. He subsequently received a Master's degree in Business Management from XLRI – Xavier School of Management, Jamshedpur.

== Career ==
After completing his academic education, Nayar joined HCL Limited in 1985. He left the company in 1992 to found Comnet in 1993, specializing in remote infrastructure management, which grew into a $1 billion technology management business. Nayar implemented several policies and practices at Comnet that later influenced HCL Technologies' "Employees First, Customers Second" philosophy.

In 1998, Comnet merged with HCL Technologies, forming HCL Comnet, where Nayar served as CEO. By 2005, he considered transitioning to social development and established the Sampark Foundation. However, he was asked by Shiv Nadar, co-founder of HCL Technologies, to continue leading the company. He was appointed President of HCL Technologies in 2005 and became CEO two years later in 2007. In August 2008, he was appointed to the Board of Directors at HCL Technologies as a whole-time director. During his tenure, he increased the company's revenue sixfold to $4.7 billion annually.

Vineet Nayar is credited with transforming HCL Technologies into the fourth-largest IT company in India, with the workforce expanding from 30,000 to 90,000 during his tenure. Nayar was appointed Vice Chairman of HCL Technologies in November 2010. He received 12.50 lakh stock options in October 2010, and his remuneration was ₹8.43 crore in the 2012 fiscal year.

In June 2012, Nayar sold his entire stake in the company for ₹133.58 crore, which he directed towards the Sampark Foundation. He retired from the HCL board in December 2013 to focus on philanthropic activities but continues to serve as a senior advisor to HCL Technologies. Vineet Nayar was appointed to the board of the National Stock Exchange of India in July 2021.

== Published work ==
He authored Employees First, Customers Second: Turning Conventional Management Upside Down, published by Harvard Business Review in 2010. The book discusses the management practices used at HCL Technologies and explains the intellectual foundation for the transformation, as well as the lessons learned. It has sold over 100,000 copies.

The book was ranked seventh on Amazon UK's list of the 'Best Business Books of 2010' and was also included in the 'Best Business Books of 2010' by the Library Journal in the United States.

== Philanthropy ==
Vineet Nayar co-founded the Sampark Foundation in 2005, a philanthropic organization that focuses on enhancing primary education for millions of school students in India. In 2013, Nayar took an active role in the organization, committing to invest $100 million into its initiatives. He applies the concept of frugal innovation in his work and collaborates with state governments across eight Indian states, including Haryana, Uttarakhand, Chhattisgarh, Uttar Pradesh, and Maharashtra. Their initiatives include distributing educational kits, setting up digital classrooms, and training teachers to improve their pedagogical skills. As of 2023, the Sampark Foundation has positively impacted approximately 10.49 million children and provided training for around 672,000 teachers in 123,000 government schools.

== Other activities ==
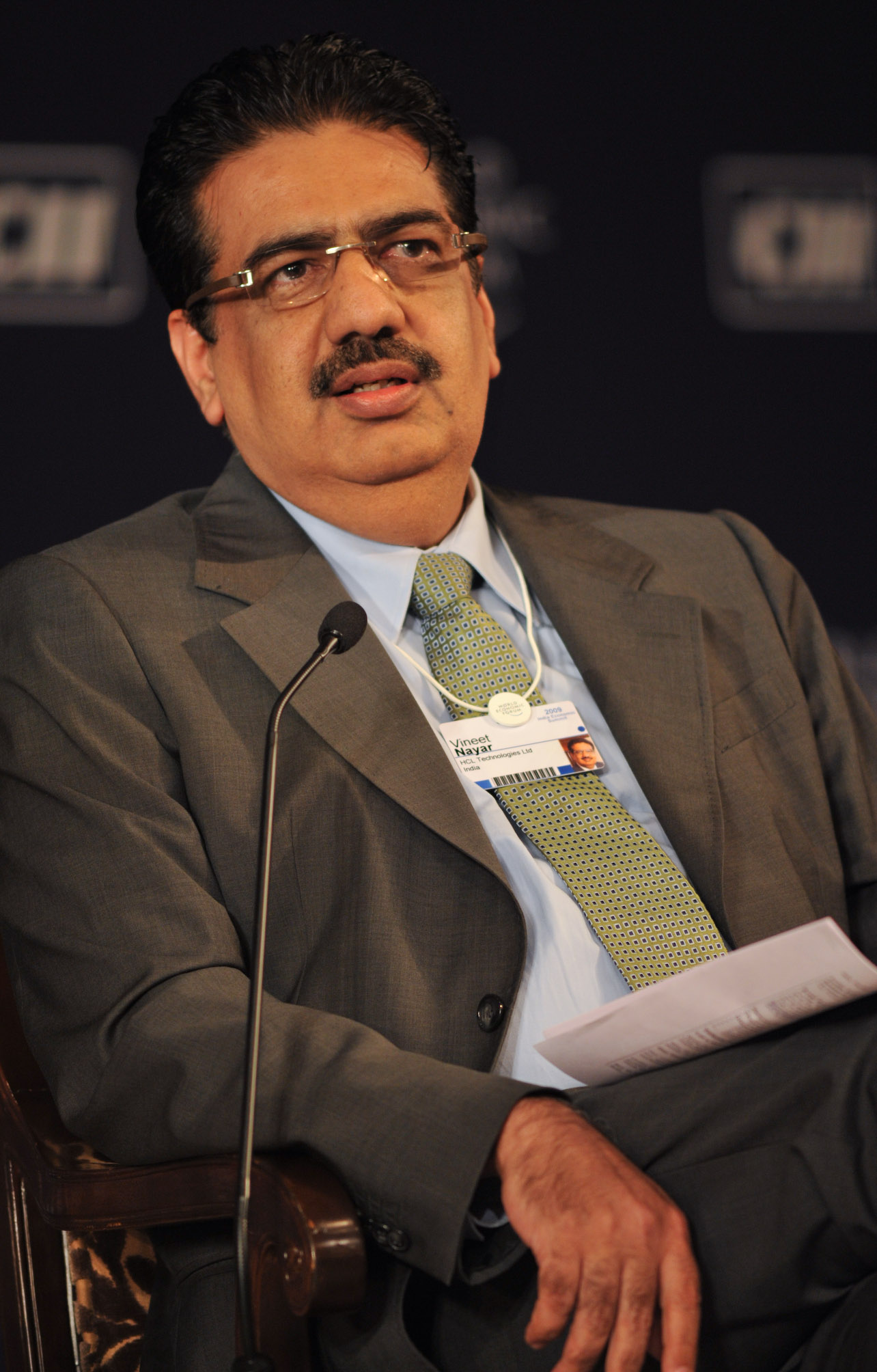
Vineet Nayar spoke at the World Economic Forum's Impatient India session in New Delhi on 9 November 2009

He served as Governor of the ICT and was a member of the Global Advisory Board for Women Leaders and the Gender Parity Program at the World Economic Forum. Additionally, he was a Community Partner of the Forum of Young Global Leaders at the World Economic Forum, where he co-chaired the 2011 Annual Meeting of New Champions.

Nayar is also a senior advisor to the McKinsey Leadership Institute and mentors 18 technology start-ups. He is involved with the Million Learning Project led by former Australian Prime Minister Julia Gillard and is a founding member of Brookings India. He has served as a juror for the Harvard Business Review's McKinsey Prize. He is a member of the Advisory Board for the Global Talent Competitiveness Index, an initiative by INSEAD.

== Awards and recognition ==
In 2011, Vineet Nayar was ranked 40th on the Thinkers 50 list of the world's most influential management thinkers. That same year, he was honored with the 'Leader in the Digital Age' Award at CeBIT and the 'Business HR Champion Award' at the European HCM Excellence Awards. He was named in Fortune's 2011 "Executive Dream Team" list. He was ranked as the No. 2 HR Influencer in India by the Society for Human Resource Management (SHRM) in 2011.

In 2012, he received the Lakshmipat Singhania – IIM Lucknow National Leadership Awards from IIM Lucknow. In 2013, he was named among Forbes magazine's "48 Heroes of Philanthropy". In 2016, Vineet Nayar and his wife, Anupama, were included in Forbes Asia's 'Heroes of Philanthropy' list.

In 2016, Vineet Nayar was named in Foreign Policys "Top 100 Global Thinkers" and featured in the 'Moguls' category alongside his wife, Anupama, for their work with the Sampark Foundation. In 2018, he was ranked 20th by the Society for Human Resource Management (SHRM) in its list of Top 30 Indian HR Influencers on Social Media.

=== Harvard Business School case studies ===
Nayar's leadership and work at the Sampark Foundation and HCL Technologies have been the subject of multiple Harvard Business School case studies. One such study, "Vineet Nayar at HCL Unstructure 2008", published in 2009, examines his implementation of the "Employees First, Customers Second" philosophy. In 2017, Harvard Business School published "Sampark Foundation: Transforming Primary Education in India," which explores innovative and cost-effective strategies implemented by Vineet Nayar and Anupama Nayar to enhance primary education. Additionally, the case "Vineet Nayar and Sampark Foundation: Frugal Innovation at Scale" (2020) discusses his efforts to scale education in rural India. Another case, "HCL Technologies (A)" (2007), details his leadership at HCL Technologies. These studies have been authored by researchers Linda A. Hill, Tarun Khanna, Emily Stecker, Emily Tedards, V. Kasturi Rangan, and Shweta Bagai.
