= S. N. Balakrishnan =

Indian academic

S N Balakrishnan

Chancellor, Shiv Nadar University
- Incumbent
- Assumed office 11 April 2014
- Preceded by: T S R Subramanian

Personal details
- Born: Moolaipozhi, Tiruchendur, Tamil Nadu, India
- Died: 24 January 2021 Rolla, Missouri, United States
- Education: University of Texas at Austin

S N Balakrishnan was the second Chancellor of Shiv Nadar University and the Chairperson of the Executive Council, the apex statutory body at the University. His brother, Shiv Nadar, is the founder of the university bearing his name.

An engineer and scientist, Balakrishnan has previously served as the founding Pro-Chancellor of the University. He heads IST Rolla, an engineering firm focused on providing clients with engineering research, development and technology. He has done work in missile defence, aircraft control, launch vehicle and spacecraft control areas. Balakrishnan teaches at the Missouri University of Science and Technology and is the Curator's Professor for Aerospace Engineering at Department of Mechanical and Aerospace Engineering.

Balakrishnan took charge of the Office of the Chancellor in April, 2014, and continued to carry forward the objectives of the University, while at the same time defining organizational structures for the University. His appointment was announced on 11 April 2014. His brother, the founder, Shiv Nadar talked about Balakrishan's "rich experience and depth in academics and research" and his "expertise in global learning pedagogy" being important for shaping up the young university.

== Education ==
Balakrishnan completed his doctoral thesis in 1983, at the University of Texas at Austin, receiving a PhD in Aerospace Engineering.
