= HCL Group =

Indian multinational technology conglomerate

- Type: Conglomerate
- Founded: 1976; 50 years ago
- Founder: Shiv Nadar
- Headquarters: Noida, Uttar Pradesh, India
- Area served: Worldwide
- Key people: Roshni Nadar Malhotra (Chairperson, HCL Group & HCLTech); Shikhar Malhotra (Chairman, HCL Capital & India Chip Pvt. Ltd.)
- Subsidiaries: HCLTech; HCL Infosystems; HCL Healthcare; India Chip Pvt. Ltd.
- Website: www.hcl.com

HCL Group (formerly Hindustan Computers Limited) is an Indian multinational conglomerate that operates across sectors including information technology, healthcare, education and semiconductor manufacturing. Its largest subsidiary, HCLTech, provides IT consulting and engineering services to enterprises in industries including financial services, manufacturing, telecommunications, and technology.

== History ==
=== Founding and early years ===
HCL started as a company focused on the development of microcomputer systems and electronic computing products. It was founded in 1976 as Hindustan Computers Limited (HCL) by Shiv Nadar along with seven other founders, formerly associated with Delhi Cloth & General Mills (DCM).

In 1978, HCL introduced the Micro 2200, regarded as one of the earliest microcomputers designed and manufactured in India. During the 1980s, the company expanded its product portfolio to include enterprise computing systems and personal computers.

In 1981, HCL participated in the establishment of NIIT as a technology education institution, which was later spun off as an independent organization.

=== Expansion and global partnerships ===
During the early 1990s, HCL expanded its business through international partnerships and distribution agreements. In 1991, the group formed a joint venture with Hewlett-Packard to distribute computing products and services in India.

In 1994, the company expanded its distribution operations through partnerships with telecommunications companies including Nokia and Ericsson.

As the global technology industry increasingly shifted toward software services and outsourcing, HCL began restructuring its business operations. HCL Technologies was established as a separate entity focused on software development and IT services, while HCL Infosystems was reorganized to manage hardware manufacturing, systems integration, and domestic market operations.

HCL Technologies expanded its global delivery operations and completed an initial public offering in 2000.

=== Shift from hardware to IT services ===
During the 2000s, HCL Technologies expanded internationally and became one of India's major IT services companies, providing application development, infrastructure services, and engineering solutions to enterprise clients.

During the same period, the group's hardware manufacturing business declined as the global personal computer market changed, and competition from international manufacturers increased. HCL Infosystems discontinued the manufacturing of HCL-branded personal computers in 2013 and shifted its focus toward technology distribution and services.

=== Diversification and new initiatives ===
In recent years, HCL Group has expanded into sectors including healthcare services, education technology, and semiconductor manufacturing.

The group has invested in technology education and skills development companies including GUVI, a digital learning platform providing programming and technical education in multiple Indian languages.

In 2025, Prudential plc announced plans to establish a standalone health insurance joint venture in India with Vama Sundari Investments, a promoter entity of HCL Group - with Prudential holding a 70% stake.

In 2025, HCL Group entered a 60:40 semiconductor joint venture with Foxconn named India Chip Private Limited. The Government of India approved a ₹3,706 crore Outsourced Semiconductor Assembly and Test (OSAT) facility in Jewar, Uttar Pradesh, under the India Semiconductor Mission.

== Businesses ==
HCL Group operates through several companies across technology services, healthcare, and technology distribution.

=== HCLTech ===
HCLTech is the group's largest company and operates as a global provider of IT services and engineering solutions. The company offers services including application development, cloud computing, cybersecurity, infrastructure management, and engineering services for enterprise clients across multiple industries.

=== HCL Infosystems ===
HCL Infosystems historically managed the group's hardware manufacturing and personal computer business in India. After discontinuing PC manufacturing in 2013, the company transitioned toward technology distribution, systems integration, and services.

=== HCL Healthcare ===
HCL Healthcare provides clinical care and workplace health services in India. The business operates a network of clinics and health centers offering preventive healthcare, diagnostics, and occupational health services.
