= TSCG =

TSCG may refer to:

- Treaty on Stability, Coordination and Governance in the Economic and Monetary Union
- The Saint Consulting Group, a privately held management consulting firm based in Hingham, Massachusetts
- Teniski savez Crne Gore, name of the Montenegro Tennis Association
