= Mohnish =

Mohnish is a masculine name of Indian origin. The name generally means "Lord Krishna". People with name Mohnish are mainly Hindu by religion.

Lord Shiva once decided to impersonate Lord Krishna and participate in the dance with the Gopi's. He dressed up/impersonated Lord Krishna and danced with the Gopi's. Lord Krishna of course realized that and called him "Mohan+ish" i.e. being Mohan. So the name Mohnish although related to Lord Krishna, was actually given by Lord Krishna to Lord Shiva.

== Notable people ==
- Mohnish Bahl (born 1961), Indian actor
- Mohnish Mishra (born 1984), Indian cricketer
- Mohnish Pabrai (born 1964), Indian-American businessman, investor and philanthropist
