= Stig Brodersen =

Danish investor, author

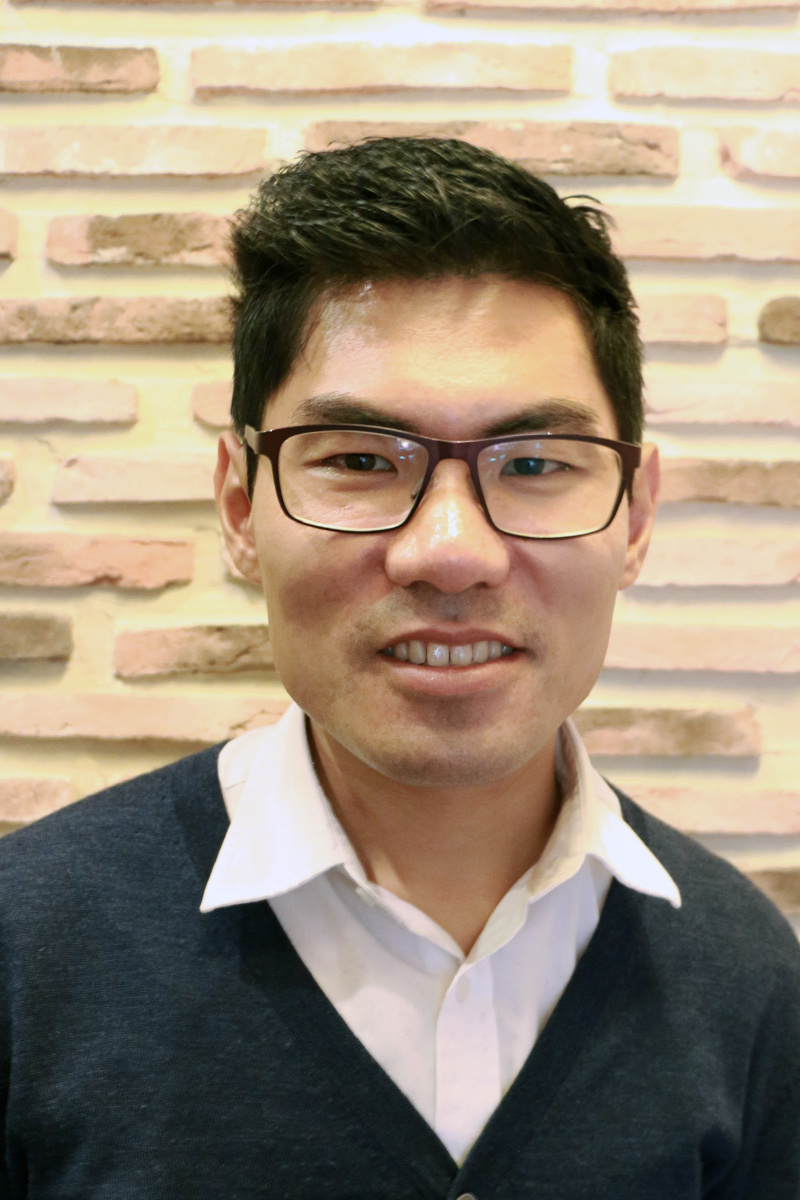
- Stig Brodersen in 2016
- Born: August 1, 1984 (age 42)
- Education: Aarhus University
- Occupations: Host of The Investor's Podcast and International Best-Selling Author
- Spouse: Sofie Brodersen
- Website: http://stigbrodersen.com http://www.theinvestorspodcast.com

Stig Brodersen (born August 1, 1984) is a Danish investor, author, and former college professor. He is the owner of the investment company Stig Brodersen Holding, and the co-founder and show host of The Investors Podcast.

== Education ==
Brodersen entered Aarhus University in 2005 to study Business and Managerial Economics. He received his bachelor's degree in 2008 and graduated from the said institution with a master's degree in Finance and International Business in 2010. He also took courses about Business Analysis at Harvard University.

== Professional career ==
Brodersen has studied numerous value investors and was especially drawn to Warren Buffett and his simple but thorough investment strategy. While researching on the American billionaire, Brodersen met fellow Buffett enthusiast Preston Pysh online and decided to collaborate with him. This partnership resulted to 3 books; BuffettBooks.com, an educational site about how to invest like Warren Buffett; and The Investors Podcast, a podcast that studies billionaires and discusses the books those billionaires read. With more than 25 million downloads, The Investors Podcast was hailed by Business Insider as the number 1 finance-related podcast and was recommended by CNBC's Closing Bell as the number 1 investing podcast of 2016. Guests of the show have included: Howard Marks, Guy Spier, Tony Robbins and Mohnish Pabrai. Brodersen's own investing approach is heavily inspired by Warren Buffett and Benjamin Graham’s conservative value investing approach.

Brodersen taught financial management, economics, and accounting courses at Business Academy Aarhus from August 2013 to June 2017. He has been managing his own investment company Stig Brodersen Holding since January 2014.

In July 2018, Brodersen held the keynote at Investeerimisklubi, Estonia's largest investing conference.

== Publications ==
- The Intelligent Investor, A Summary of Benjamin Graham’s Original Work (2014)
- Warren Buffett Accounting Book (2014)
- Security Analysis, A Summary of Benjamin Graham and David Dodd’s Original Work (2014)

== Health ==
Stig has had a kidney transplant.
