= Rajiv Swarup =

Electrical engineer and co founder of Shiv Nadar University in Uttar Pradesh

== Proposed deletion of Rajiv Swarup ==
The article Rajiv Swarup has been proposed for deletion because of the following concern:

lacks notability

You may prevent the proposed deletion by removing the {{proposed deletion/dated}} notice, but please explain why in your edit summary or on the article's talk page.

Please consider improving the page to address the issues raised. Removing {{proposed deletion/dated}} will stop the proposed deletion process, but other deletion processes exist. In particular, articles for deletion allows discussion to reach consensus for deletion based on established criteria.

If the proposed deletion has already been carried out, you may request undeletion of the article at any time.

Rajiv Swarup

President, Shiv Nadar University
- Incumbent
- Assumed office July 20, 2013

Personal details
- Education: Indian Institute of Technology, Kanpur; University of Delhi
- Awards: Six Sigma Green Belt Holder

Rajiv Swarup is the founding president of Shiv Nadar University.

An electrical engineer from the Indian Institute of Technology, Kanpur, he has experience in incubating, managing and developing both the strategic and operational aspects of large sized businesses. Swarup retired from HCL Technologies as Senior Corporate Vice President and Chief Customer Officer – Strategic Accounts based out of Rochester New York.

Swarup graduated from Christ Church Boys Senior Secondary School in Madhya Pradesh, India, 1967. He received his Bachelor of Technology in Electrical Engineering from the Indian Institute of Technology Kanpur in Kanpur in May 1973 and his MBA from University of Delhi in 2001.
