= Leading from behind =

Leading from behind is a phrase quoted by journalist Ryan Lizza as having been uttered by an anonymous advisor to Barack Obama in April 2011 with regards to the Libyan civil war. Although the phrase was assailed by critics of Obama, four months after the phrase was first uttered, journalist Ben Smith applauded Obama's policy in the Libyan civil war during the Battle of Tripoli (2011). As of October 2011, the identity of the person who uttered the phrase has not been identified. National Security Council spokesperson Tommy Vietor speculated that the phrase did not originate within the Obama Administration, but Lizza stood by his report that it was said by a person associated with the administration.

The phrase inspired several books, including

- Miniter, Richard (2013). Leading From Behind: The Reluctant President and the Advisors Who Decide for Him. St. Martin's Griffin. ISBN 978-1250031389.
- London, Herbert (2017). Leading From Behind: The Obama Doctrine and the U.S. Retreat From International Affairs. Liberty Island Media. ISBN 978-0692839218.
- Feaver, Peter (2012). "American Grand Strategy At the Crossroads: Leading from the Front, Leading From Behind, or Not Leading at All". In Lord, Kristin M.; Fontaine, Richard (eds.). America's Path: Grand Strategy for the Next Administration. Center for a New American Security.

== Use not related to Obama ==
In May 2010, Linda A. Hill published an article titled Leading from Behind in the Harvard Business Review. The idea was inspired by Nelson Mandela's autobiography, Long Walk to Freedom, where Mandela makes the analogy that leaders could be seen as having a role similar to shepherds, who direct their flocks from behind.
