= HCL BigFix =

Endpoint management platform

- Headquarters: Noida, India
- Products: BigFix Workspace+, BigFix Enterprise+, BigFix Compliance, BigFix Inventory, BigFix AEX, BigFix Lifecycle, and BigFix Runbook AI
- Parent: HCLSoftware, a division of HCLTech
- Website: www.hcl-software.com/bigfix

HCL BigFix is an endpoint management platform that automates the discovery, management, and remediation of all endpoints, including virtual, cloud, and on-premise endpoints. HCL BigFix automates the management, patching, and inventory of nearly 120+ operating systems.

== History ==
In 2010, IBM acquired BigFix, Inc., a software developer out of Emeryville, California, and its endpoint security platform, which is also called BigFix. Under IBM, BigFix went through a series of re-brandings, including a 2013 release as IBM Endpoint Manager (IEM). Then, in 2018, India-based software company HCL acquired BigFix in a $1.8 billion purchase of select IBM software products.

== Relevance language ==
Relevant language enables authors to query the hardware and software properties of networked clients. Developed for BigFix prior to its purchase by IBM, the Relevance language provides an interface displaying information about a client, such as processor usage or available disk space, and it allows for real-time modifications of all clients in the network. Relevance language abstracts platform-specific query mechanisms like proc filesystems (procfs) and SIM, and it is capable of responding faster than native alternatives, like Windows Management Instrumentation (WMI).

== ActionScript ==
ActionScript is a scripting language used in BigFix. ActionScript provides an interface to administer clients. ActionScript abstracts platform-specific scripting differences like directory traversal, script execution, and flow control, allowing an administrator to write a script once and apply it across all platforms.

== Platform components ==
The core HCL BigFix platform can be extended using additional components:

- HCL BigFix for lifecycle management includes patch management, remote control, software distribution, and OS deployment. Patch management includes patches for Microsoft, UNIX, Linux, and Macintosh operating systems. Remote control allows for remote monitoring and control of network PCs and servers. Software distribution provides a package library and automation toolkit for endpoint administrators. OS deployment provides for imaging and provisioning of operating systems as well as OS migration capabilities.
- HCL BigFix for patch management includes vendor patches for Microsoft, UNIX, Linux, and Macintosh operating systems as well as patches for third-party applications by Adobe, Google, and Microsoft.
- HCL BigFix for security and compliance provides common STIG, CIS, and third-party security baselines, network self-quarantine, and removable device control.
- HCL BigFix for software asset management gathers information about installed software and hardware in a customer's infrastructure. Software use analysis tracks application usage on endpoints to determine the number and type of licenses required for licensed software.
- HCL BigFix for server automation provides hypervisor operations to build and manage virtual machines in a data centre environment. In addition, the server automation component provides the ability to do middleware management tasks to support operating system patching for clustered systems.
