= HCI =

HCI may refer to:

== Computing ==
- Happy Computers, an American computer hardware manufacturer
- Home Computer Initiative, a United Kingdom government programme to increase computers usage
- Host controller interface (disambiguation), various computer interfaces
- Human–computer interaction, the study of how people interact with computers
  - Human-computer interaction (security), the study of how people interact with computers concerning information security
- Hyper-converged infrastructure, an IT infrastructure framework for integrating storage, networking and virtualization computing in a data center.

== Education ==
- Harbord Collegiate Institute, a school in Toronto, Canada
- Humberside Collegiate Institute, a school in Toronto, Canada
- Hwa Chong Institution, a school in Singapore

== Science ==
- Highly charged ion
- Hot carriers injection, in solid-state electronic devices
- Hydrocarbon indicator, in reflection seismology

== Organizations ==
- Handgun Control, Inc., the former name of the Brady Campaign to Prevent Gun Violence
- Harrisburg City Islanders, a soccer club from the United States
- HCI Books (Health Communications Inc), an American publishing house, see What the Bleep Do We Know!?
- Human Concern International, a Canadian relief and development organization
- Huntsman Cancer Institute, an American cancer research facility and hospital

== Other uses ==
- Heavy-Chemical Industry Drive, a former economic development plan of South Korea

== See also ==
- HCL (disambiguation)
- HCIL (disambiguation)
- HCl (H-C-lowercase L), chemical formula of Hydrogen chloride
