= Rupamanjari Ghosh =

Indian physicist

- Education: Rajabazar Science College; University of Calcutta; University of Rochester
- Awards: Streeshakti Science Samman, 2008
- Scientific career
- Fields: Quantum Optics, Nonlinear Optics, Quantum Information
- Workplaces: Shiv Nadar University, Jawaharlal Nehru University
- Doctoral advisor: Leonard Mandel

Rupamanjari Ghosh was the second Vice-Chancellor (1 February 2016 – 31 January 2022) of Shiv Nadar University, Uttar Pradesh, India. She is also the former founding Director of School of Natural Sciences and founding Dean of Research & Graduate Studies at Shiv Nadar University, and a former Professor of physics and Dean at the School of Physical Sciences, Jawaharlal Nehru University, New Delhi. Her research areas include Experimental and Theoretical Quantum Optics, Laser Physics, Nonlinear Optics, Quantum Information, Quantum Measurement and Magneto-Optics.

== Education and career ==
Ghosh is a researcher, teacher, orator and an academic administrator. Ghosh has B.Sc.(Physics honors) and M.Sc.(Physics) degrees from the University of Calcutta campus - Rajabazar Science College, and a Ph.D. in Physics from the University of Rochester, NY in Quantum Optics where she worked as a Rush Rhees Fellow. Her research interests are in Experimental and Theoretical Quantum Optics, Laser Physics, Nonlinear Optics, and Quantum Information. Her work with Prof Leonard Mandel on two-photon interference (using the nonlinear optical process of spontaneous parametric down-conversion) involved the creation and use of a source of entangled photon pairs, and of single photons. After her Ph.D., she returned to India and joined the School of Physical Sciences, Jawaharlal Nehru University, where she held academic and administrative positions over a span of 24 years. She has also held several Visiting Positions at Université Paris-Sud, Universite de Rennes I and École Normale Supérieure among others.

Ghosh is a former Dean, School of Physical Sciences at Jawaharlal Nehru University, New Delhi. Recipient of the Stree Shakti Science Samman for her "original contribution to Science", she serves as an expert in DST (Government of India) committees in Physical Sciences, in UGC, CSIR, and in many Central and State universities and institutes. She has also served as the Chief Advisor for the National Council of Educational Research and Training (NCERT) Science textbooks for Classes IX and X, developed afresh under the National Curriculum Framework-2005.

She joined the Shiv Nadar University in 2012 as the founding Director of the School of Natural Sciences. She also took charge as the founding Dean of Research & Graduate Studies, the founding Head of the Faculty Development Center, and later, as the Director of the School of Engineering. She became the Vice-Chancellor of Shiv Nadar University in February 2016.

== Awards ==
Ghosh was awarded the Streeshakti Science Samman in 2008.
