= GUVI =

Indian online education platform

GUVI Geek Networks Pvt. Ltd.
- Type: Private
- Industry: E-Learning, Edtech, Online Education
- Founded: 2011; 15 years ago (as a YouTube channel); 2014; 12 years ago (as a company)
- Founders: Arun Prakash (founder & CEO); Late Sridevi Arun Prakash (co-founder); SP Balamurugan (co-founder)
- Parent: HCL
- Website: guvi.in

GUVI (named as an acronym of Grab Your Vernacular Imprint) is an online platform to learn computer programming based in India. It offers free and paid coding courses to students and working professionals in Indian languages such as Hindi, Telugu, Kannada, Swahili, Bengali, Tamil, and in English. GUVI's mission is "to make technical education available to all in their native languages".

== History ==
GUVI was started as a YouTube channel in 2011. The channel posted video tutorials, courses, and practice materials created by Arun Prakash, Sridevi Arun Prakash, and SP Balamurugan. The videos were posted in Tamil, Telugu, and Marathi, with the goal of reaching people not fluent in English.

The trio quit their job in 2014 and started GUVI as a company. Seeded with an initial capital of ₹1,000,000, the start-up was incubated at the Rural Technology and Business Incubator (RTBI) based out of IIT Madras. The start-up raised seed funding of ₹500,000, and officially launched in November 2014.

GUVI received its first institutional round of funding of ₹10,000,000, from US-based Gray Matters Capital's edLABS in April 2019. It raised ₹60,000,000 in its pre-series A round of funding from Education Catalyst Fund, an education-focused venture capital fund managed by CBA Capital, in April 2020.

== Events ==
GUVI conducted All India Robotic Process Automation Skillathon, with UiPath, in June 2020, to provide students an opportunity to get exposure to robotic process automation. The event included over 400 colleges across India and over 60,000 participants.

GUVI offered free online coding courses in March 2020 (during the COVID-19 pandemic lockdown in India).

Co-founder Sridevi Arun Prakash died on 20 September 2020 due to Breathing problem.

In 2022, HCL Group acquired a majority stake in GUVI. Following the acquisition, the organization was rebranded as HCL GUVI. The rebranding also aligned GUVI’s vision with HCL’s broader mission of advancing digital education and workforce development.

== Recognition and awards ==
GUVI was supported by Google's Launchpad Accelerator Program in 2017.
