= Moolaipozhi =

- Village
- Location in Tamil Nadu, India Moolaipozhi (India)
- Coordinates: 8.550878622302076°N 78.05949975749746°E
- Country: India
- State: Tamil Nadu
- District: Tuticorin

Languages
  - Official: Tamil
- Time zone: UTC+5:30 (IST)
- PIN: 628201
- Vehicle registration: TN-92
- Nearest city: Tiruchendur

Moolaipozhi is a coastal village in the Tuticorin district in Tamil Nadu State, India.

== Notable personalities ==
- Shiv Nadar the founder and chairman of HCL and the Shiv Nadar Foundation was born in this village.
