= Griffiths Commission on Personal Debt =

The Griffiths Commission on Personal Debt was a British public inquiry launched in 2004 by Oliver Letwin, MP, the then Conservative Shadow Chancellor, to investigate the increasing problem of personal debt in the United Kingdom. Although initially formed by the Conservative Party, the Commission took evidence from individuals of all political persuasion, and sought to achieve consensus across the political spectrum.

The final report entitled What Price Credit? was published by the Centre for Social Justice in March 2005. Elements of the report were welcomed by the Conservative and Liberal Democrat parties, although there was no official response from the then ruling Labour Party.

== Members of the Commission ==
The Commission members were as follows:

- Lord Griffiths of Fforestfach (chairman)
- Manish Chande
- Professor Iwan Davies
- Tom Jackson (Secretary)
- Rt Reverend James Jones
- Heather Keates
- Prue Leith OBE
- Keith Tondeur

== Achievements ==
Although the Commission report did not directly lead to any change in policy, it has been quoted and referenced by a number of subsequent reports such as the House of Lords EU Select committee Thirteenth Report when they were investigating EU Consumer Credit harmonisation.

== Failures ==
Arguably the biggest failure was the party-political aspect of the launch of the commission. The commission was first launched by the Conservative Party, which led to a mistaken belief that the resulting report would be biased to one political viewpoint. More significantly, the belief of political bias led to the refusal of some organisations to co-operate with the commission, most notably the Bank of England, seemingly after pressure from the Chancellor of the Exchequer Gordon Brown.
