= HCIL =

HCIL may refer to:

- Honda Cars India Ltd (HCIL)
- University of Maryland Human–Computer Interaction Lab (HCIL)

== See also ==
- HCI (disambiguation)
