= C Vijayakumar =

Indian business executive (born 1967)

C VijayaKumar
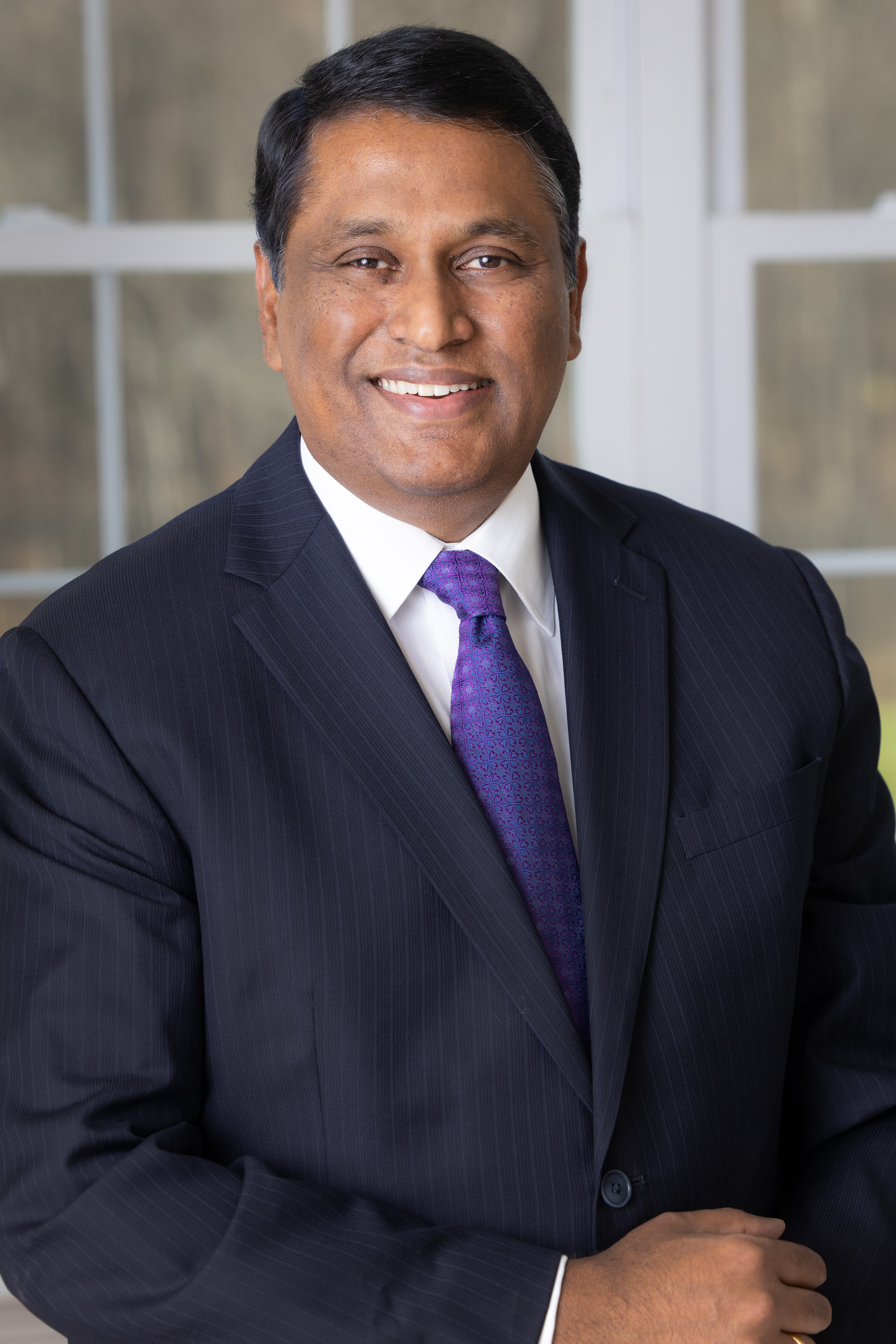
- Born: Tamil Nadu, India
- Education: PSG College of Technology (B.Eng.) and Lawrence School, Lovedale
- Occupation: Business executive
- Known for: Chief Executive Officer and Managing Director, HCLTech
- Website: www.hcltech.com/leadership#c-vijayakumar

C Vijayakumar is an Indian business executive who is the CEO and Managing Director of multinational technology company HCLTech. He was appointed the company’s CEO in October 2016 and its Managing Director in July 2021.

== Early life and education ==
Vijayakumar was born in Coimbatore in Tamil Nadu, India and did his schooling from ‘The Lawrence School’ in Lovedale, Ooty and Thambu Higher Secondary School, Government Press Colony, Coimbatore. He is a graduate in Electrical & Electronics Engineering from P.S.G. College of Technology, Tamil Nadu, India and currently resides in New Jersey in the USA.

== Career ==
C Vijayakumar joined HCLTech in 1994 in the founding startup team of Comnet as a senior technical engineer. He was appointed the company's chief operating officer in July 2016 and in October that same year was promoted to be the CEO, succeeding Anant Gupta.

Prior to becoming COO of the company, he was the President of HCL's infrastructure services business.

== Recognition ==
- Vijayakumar was rated by Business Today as the Best CEO of the Year, 2020 in IT/ITES Industry.
- He was included in the list of Top 10 Disruptive CEOs by industry analyst group, HfS.

== See also ==
- Shiv Nadar founder of HCLTech
