= Starschema =

Data services consultancy

Starschema Inc.
- Company type: Private
- Industry: Professional services
- Founded: 2006; 20 years ago in Budapest, Hungary
- Headquarters: Arlington, Virginia, United States
- Key people: Tamas Foldi (CEO); Laszlo Szakall (COO); Peter Csillag (co-founder)
- Services: Data science; Data visualization; Data engineering; Strategic consulting
- Revenue: ▲US$ 14.2m; (2020)
- Number of employees: ▲250+; (2020)
- Divisions: Data science and Advanced Analytics; Data visualization; Data Engineering; Strategy; Intramural Research
- Website: starschema.com

Starschema Inc. is a global data services consultancy based in Arlington, VA with additional offices in San Francisco, Budapest and Szeged.

== History ==
Founded in 2006 in Budapest, Hungary, Starschema initially worked for the European market. By the early 2010s, the company counted a number of Fortune 500 companies among its clients, including General Electric, Apple Inc. and Johnson & Johnson. In 2016, the Government of Hungary awarded Starschema the Grand Prix for Innovation in IT, and the company opened its US headquarters in the following year after a $5m investment by the Central European venture capital fund PortfoLion. Despite the COVID-19 pandemic, Starschema posted a revenue of $14.2m for the 2020 fiscal year. On 14 January 2022, HCL Technologies announced an agreement to acquire Starschema for US$42,500,000 (equivalent to $46,757,733 in 2025), subject to regulatory approvals from the Government of Hungary. The acquisition was finalized on 6 April 2022.

== Services ==
Starschema's customer base has in recent years shifted towards a greater emphasis on the healthcare and life sciences portfolio. Alongside large multinational corporations, Starschema also serves a range of NGOs, such as the UN's World Food Programme. The company's global network of partners includes Amazon Web Services, Snowflake Inc. and Tableau Software. The company's main practice areas are

- data science, AI and machine learning,
- strategic consulting,
- data engineering, e.g. data warehousing and data lakes, and
- data visualization.

== Awards and recognition ==
The Financial Times ranked Starschema among the 1,000 fastest growing companies in Europe in 2019, and the company was listed as one of the fifty fastest-growing technology companies in Central Europe by Deloitte. In 2018, Aon Hewitt ranked Starschema as one of the best places to work in Hungary.

Starschema's work in public health has been widely recognized, including the company's cooperation with PATH on malaria surveillance in Ethiopia, Zambia and Senegal. During the COVID-19 pandemic, Starschema partnered with Snowflake Inc. to provide a comprehensive COVID-19 data set through Snowflake's Data Exchange.
