= Shiv Nadar University =

Private university in Uttar Pradesh, India

- Other name: SNU
- Type: Private; Institute of Eminence
- Established: 2011
- Founder: Shiv Nadar
- Affiliations: UGC
- Chancellor: Shikhar Malhotra
- Vice-Chancellor: Ananya Mukherjee
- Location: Chithara, Dadri, Gautam Buddh Nagar district, Uttar Pradesh, India
- Campus: 286 Acres; Urban
- Website: www.snu.edu.in/home

University rankings

General – India
- NIRF (Overall) (2024): 95
- NIRF (Universities) (2024): 62

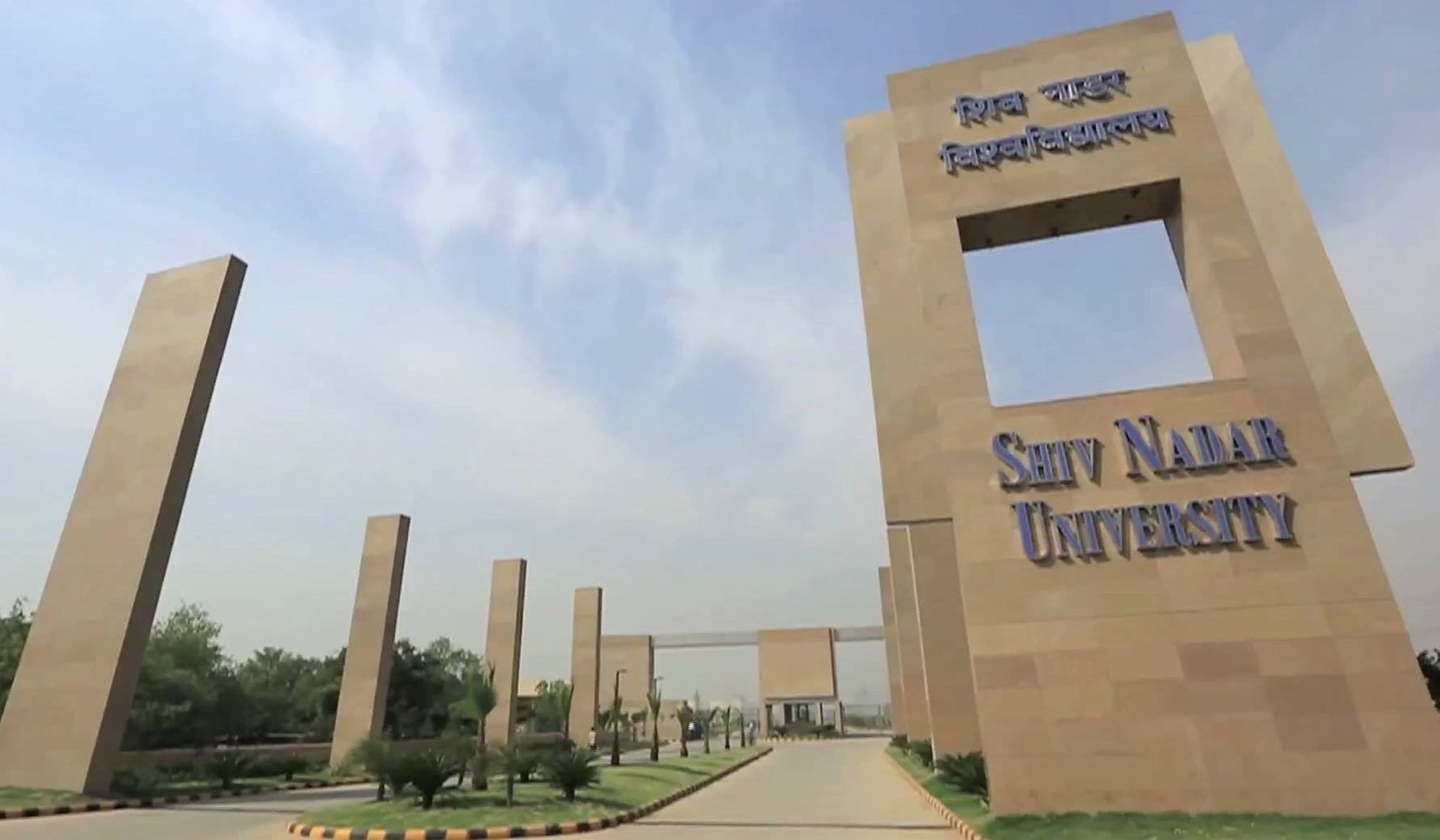
SNU entrance

Shiv Nadar University (Institute of Eminence) is a private university located near Greater Noida, in the northern Indian state of Uttar Pradesh. It was founded in 2011 by Shiv Nadar, the founder and chairman of HCL. On August 3, 2022, Shiv Nadar University, Delhi-NCR, became the youngest university to be recognized as an Institution of Eminence by the Ministry of Education, Government of India.

== History ==
The university, established in 2011 on a 286-acre campus, had Nikhil Sinha as its first Vice-Chancellor. On 1 February 2016, Rupamanjari Ghosh succeeded him as the second Vice-Chancellor. After completing her second term, she passed the leadership to Dr. Ananya Mukherjee on 31 January 2022.

In May 2023, a student shot and killed another student before committing suicide. Reports indicated that the individuals had previously been engaged in a romantic relationship. In an investigation after an FIR was filed by the Uttar Pradesh police, it was revealed that following their breakup, the victim had expressed concerns to administrators regarding the shooter's behavior.

== Academic organization ==
=== Rankings ===
In 2025, the National Institutional Ranking Framework (NIRF) ranked Shiv Nadar University 85th overall in India and 57th among universities. The QS World University Rankings ranked the university 369th in Asia in 2025.

== Administration ==
- Rajiv Swarup, founding president of Shiv Nadar University
