= Brian Griffiths, Baron Griffiths of Fforestfach =

British politician (born 1941)

The Right Honourable The Lord Griffiths of Fforestfach
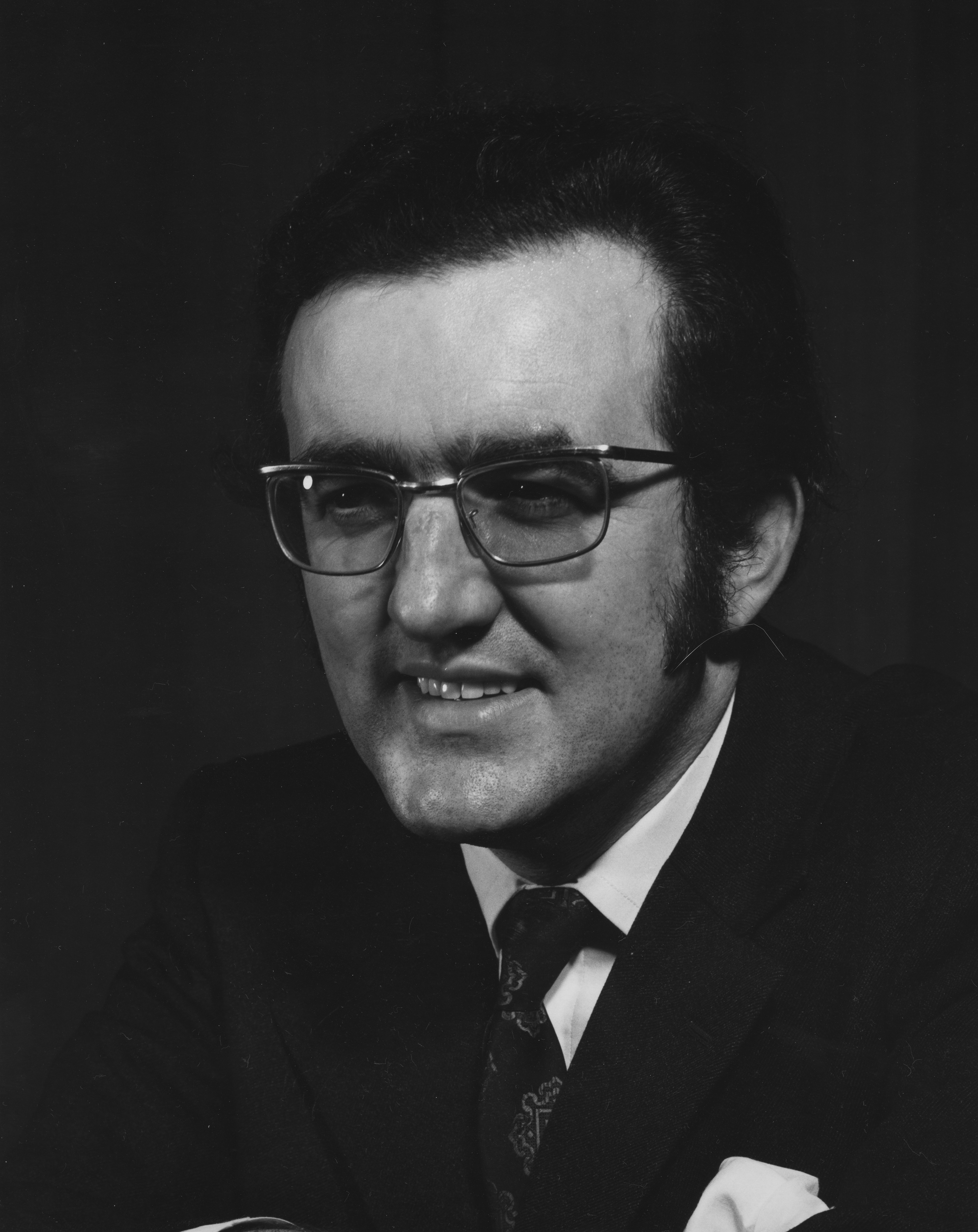
- Brian Griffiths, c1973

Director of the Number 10 Policy Unit
- In office 1985–1990
- Prime Minister: Margaret Thatcher
- Preceded by: John Redwood
- Succeeded by: Sarah Hogg

Member of the House of Lords
- Lord Temporal
- Life peerage 5 February 1991

Personal details
- Born: 27 December 1941 (age 84)
- Party: Conservative
- Education: Dynevor School, Swansea; London School of Economics
- Occupation: Politician, banker

Brian Griffiths, Baron Griffiths of Fforestfach (born 27 December 1941), is a British economist, lecturer, and Conservative life peer.

== Early life ==
Brian Griffiths was born on 27 December 1941. He was educated at Dynevor School, Swansea, and the London School of Economics (LSE), where he graduated with a BSc(Econ.) and MSc(Econ.).

== Career ==
Griffiths was made an assistant lecturer in economics at the LSE in 1965. Three years later he became a lecturer in economics at City University, remaining in that role for nearly a decade until his appointment as Professor of Banking and International Finance at the same institution in 1977. From 1982 to 1985 he was Dean of the university's Business School.

Griffiths has written and lectured on the relationship of the Christian faith to politics and business. He taught at Regent College on biblical economics in 1979, and wrote The Creation of Wealth: A Christian's Case for Capitalism in 1984. He has been influenced in this area by Rousas J. Rushdoony. Griffiths is a fellow of Sarum College and delivered the 2011 Niblett Memorial Lecture there on "A Christian Reflection on the Financial Crisis".

He served as vice-chairman of Goldman Sachs International. He said he was "not ashamed" of the bank's compensation plans. He also said the issue of banking compensation should not be thought about solely from a short-term perspective. He defended the bank's bonuses, Griffiths said the general public should "tolerate the inequality as a way to achieve greater prosperity for all", saying also that "we should not ... be ashamed of offering compensation in an internationally competitive market which ensures the bank businesses here and employs British people".

He additionally serves as Co-Conference Host at the St. Gallen Symposium, together with Roshni Nadar and Dominic Barton.

== Political career ==
In 1985 Griffiths resigned his university posts to become Margaret Thatcher's chief policy adviser. He remained Director of the Number 10 Policy Unit for the remainder of Thatcher's term as prime minister. Griffiths then became Chairman of the Centre for Policy Studies, serving from 1991 to 2001. He also served on the board of directors of the Conservative Christian Fellowship from 2000 to 2002. He was a member of the European Union Sub-Committee F (Social Affairs, Education and Home Affairs) from 1999 to 2003 and the Religious Offences Committee from 2002 to 2003. He is a vice-president of the Nature in Art Trust.

Griffiths was the Conservative Party candidate for Blyth in the February and October 1974 General Elections. He was created a life peer as Baron Griffiths, of Fforestfach in the County of West Glamorgan on 5 February 1991.

He chaired the Griffiths Commission on Personal Debt in 2004.

== Arms ==
Coat of arms of Brian Griffiths, Baron Griffiths of Fforestfach

Adopted
2007
Coronet
Coronet of a Baron
Crest
Upon a Helm with a Wreath Argent and Vert a Bear sejant erect Gules holding in the dexter forepaw a Leek proper
Escutcheon
Paly of four Vert and Argent per fess enhanced indented of two points upwards each point double barbed throughout issuing in base a pile double barbed throughout all counterchanged
Supporters
On either side statant upon a Stack of two closed Books Vert garnished Or a Male Gryphon reguardant Gules beaked forelegged and rayed Or
Motto
OFN YR ARGLWYDD Y DYW DOETHINEB
Badge
In front of an Osprey statant to the sinister Vert the crest and throat Argent beaked and legged Or an Osprey statant Gules the crest and throat Argent beaked and legged Or
Symbolism
Green and white are the ancient Welsh livery colours. The paly formation is arranged to suggest spruce clad mountains and hence an allusion to Fforestfach which means 'fair forest'. Further puns are provided by the bear for Brian and the gryphons for Griffiths.

Orders of precedence in the United Kingdom
Preceded by The Lord Palumbo	Gentlemen; Baron Griffiths of Fforestfach	Followed by The Lord Hollick
