= Mohnish Pabrai =

Indian-American businessman (born 1964)

- Born: Mumbai, India
- Education: Clemson University
- Occupations: Investor, businessman and philanthropist
- Spouse(s): Harina Kapoor; (m. 1992; div. 2019)

Mohnish Pabrai is an Indian-American businessman, investor, and philanthropist. He was born in Bombay (Mumbai), India, on June 12, 1964. He is the founder and managing partner of Pabrai Investment Funds, a value-oriented investment firm that manages over $1 billion in assets.

== Career ==
Pabrai worked with Tellabs between 1986–91, first in its high speed data networking group, and then in 1989, joined its international subsidiary, working in international marketing and sales.

In 1991, he started his IT consulting and systems integration company, TransTech, Inc. with about US$30,000 from his own 401(k) account and US$70,000 from credit card debt. He sold the company in 2000 to Kurt Salmon Associates for US$20 million. Today he is the managing partner of the Pabrai Investment Funds (a family of hedge funds inspired by Buffett Partnerships), which he founded in 1999.

== Books ==
Pabrai has high regard for Warren Buffett and has said that his investment style is "cloned" from Buffett and other value investors. He has written a book on his investing style: The Dhandho Investor: The Low - Risk Value Method to High Returns. In June 2007, he made headlines by bidding US$650,100 with Guy Spier for a charity lunch with Buffett.

Another book by Pabrai is Mosaic: Perspectives on Investing. In this book, Pabrai has distilled the Warren Buffett method of investing down to a few points. These points are made in a series of articles he authored for various newsletters and web sites between 2001 and 2003 (the book reprints these articles in reverse chronological order).

Pabrai's approach to life is covered extensively in Guy Spier's book, The Education of a Value Investor, in particular in a chapter titled "Doing Business the Buffett-Pabrai Way".

== Dakshana Foundation ==
In 2005, Pabrai and his wife, Harina Kapoor started the Dakshana Foundation (an offering or gift, typically to a guru or priest) with the goal of recycling most of their wealth back to society. Their starting point is to give back approximately 2%, or US$1 million every year. The initial goal is the alleviation of poverty in India. The tool that has been chosen is to provide tutoring services to some of the least privileged members of Indian society, and to enable them to attend some of the elite institutions of higher learning. Pabrai credits Anand Kumar, the founder of Ramanujan School of Mathematics (also known as the Super 30) with originating this idea.

== Family history ==
Pabrai's father variously founded, bankrupted, or sold 15 companies. Pabrai's grandfather was famous magician Gogia Pasha.
