= HCL Axon =

UK-based consultancy

HCL AXON
- Company type: Subsidiary
- Industry: Consulting
- Founded: 1994; 32 years ago
- Headquarters: Egham, Surrey
- Key people: C Vijayakumar (president & CEO - HCL Technologies); Stephen Cardell (president - HCL AXON)
- Parent: HCL Technologies
- Website: www.hcltech.com

HCL AXON is a UK-based consultancy which sells its services to customers using SAP and Oracle as their enterprise resource planning (ERP) system modeling tools. Previously listed on the London Stock Exchange, and a FTSE 250 Index constituent, the company has been a subsidiary of Indian outsourcing firm HCL Technologies since December 2008, after the reverse merger of Axon Group and HCL SAP practice.

== History ==
The company was founded by Mark Hunter, Donald Kirkwood and Paul Manweiler in 1994. It acquired Feanix in 2005. In August 2008 Infosys Technologies offered £407m to acquire the business. This offer was subsequently beaten by a rival offer for £441m by HCL Technologies. The acquisition by HCL was completed in December 2008.

On 7 September 2005, HCL Axon expanded its operations base in the counties of Armagh and Belfast in Northern Ireland. At the 2006 UK Trade and Investment India Business Awards in New Delhi, then Tony Blair, Prime Minister of the United Kingdom announced the expansion, which is aimed at creating more IT and BPO jobs in the area. HCL Armagh and HCL Northern Ireland acquired the Armagh-based Answerall Direct earlier in 2005. HCL BPO services in Ireland are carried out through its main delivery centers in Armagh and Belfast.

On 17 July 2009 HCL AXON announced the acquisition of South Africa-based UCS Group's Enterprise Solutions SAP practice.

On 1 July 2010, HCL AXON became the Enterprise Application Services part of HCL Technologies, incorporating SAP, Oracle, and Microsoft offerings. In November 2011, after HCL revealed an expansion plan in the Irish Republic county of Kilkenny, its Business Process Outsourcing (BPO) division in Northern Ireland won a contract for back-office services from the Department of Health. It was aimed at increasing the number of jobs and other employment opportunities in the region.
