= Roshni Nadar =

Indian businesswoman

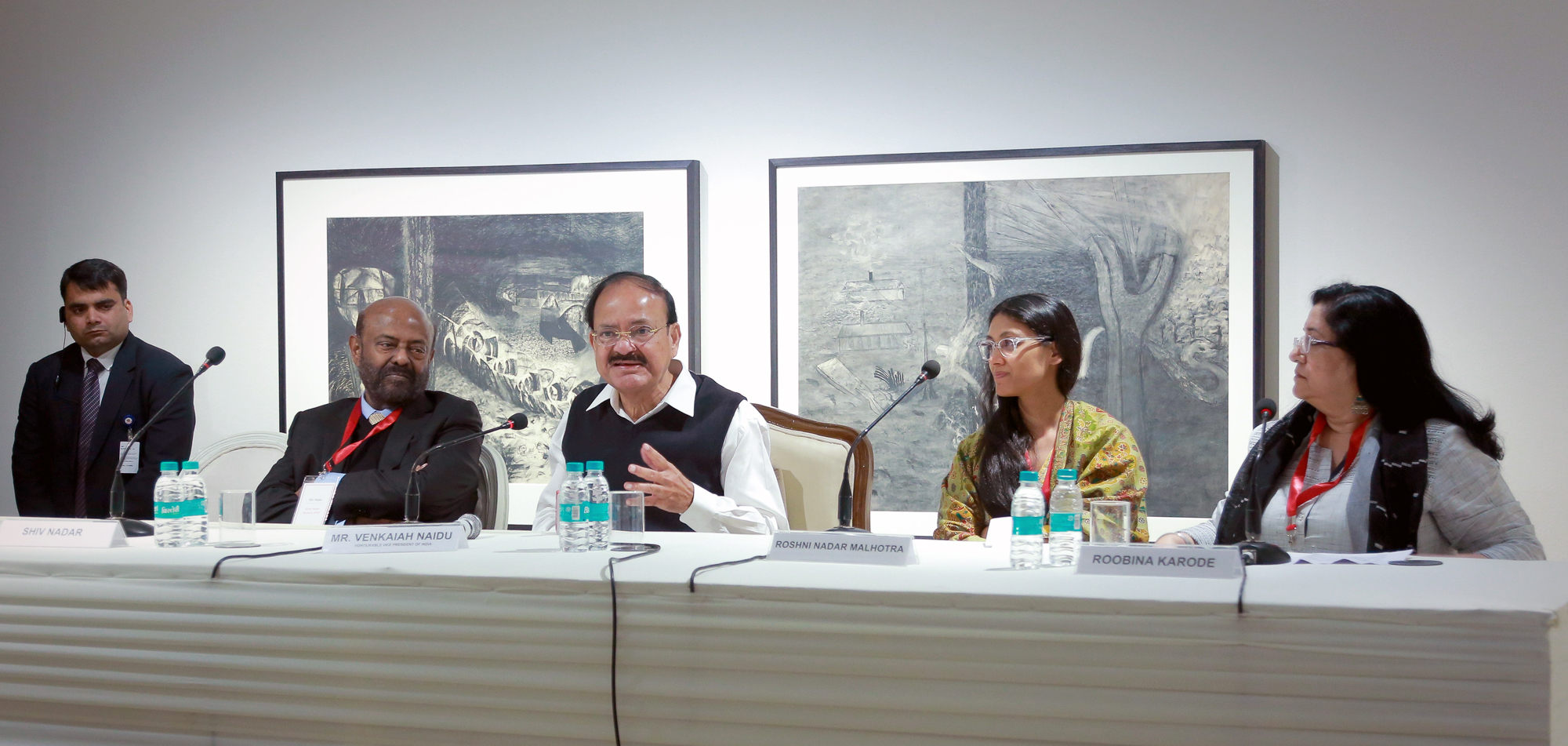
- Nadar in 2018
- Born: 1981 or 1982 (age 44–45)
- Education: Northwestern University (BA, MBA)
- Occupations: Chairperson, HCL Technologies
- Spouse: Shikhar Malhotra (m. 2010)
- Children: 2 sons
- Parent(s): Shiv Nadar; Kiran Nadar
- Website: www.hcltech.com

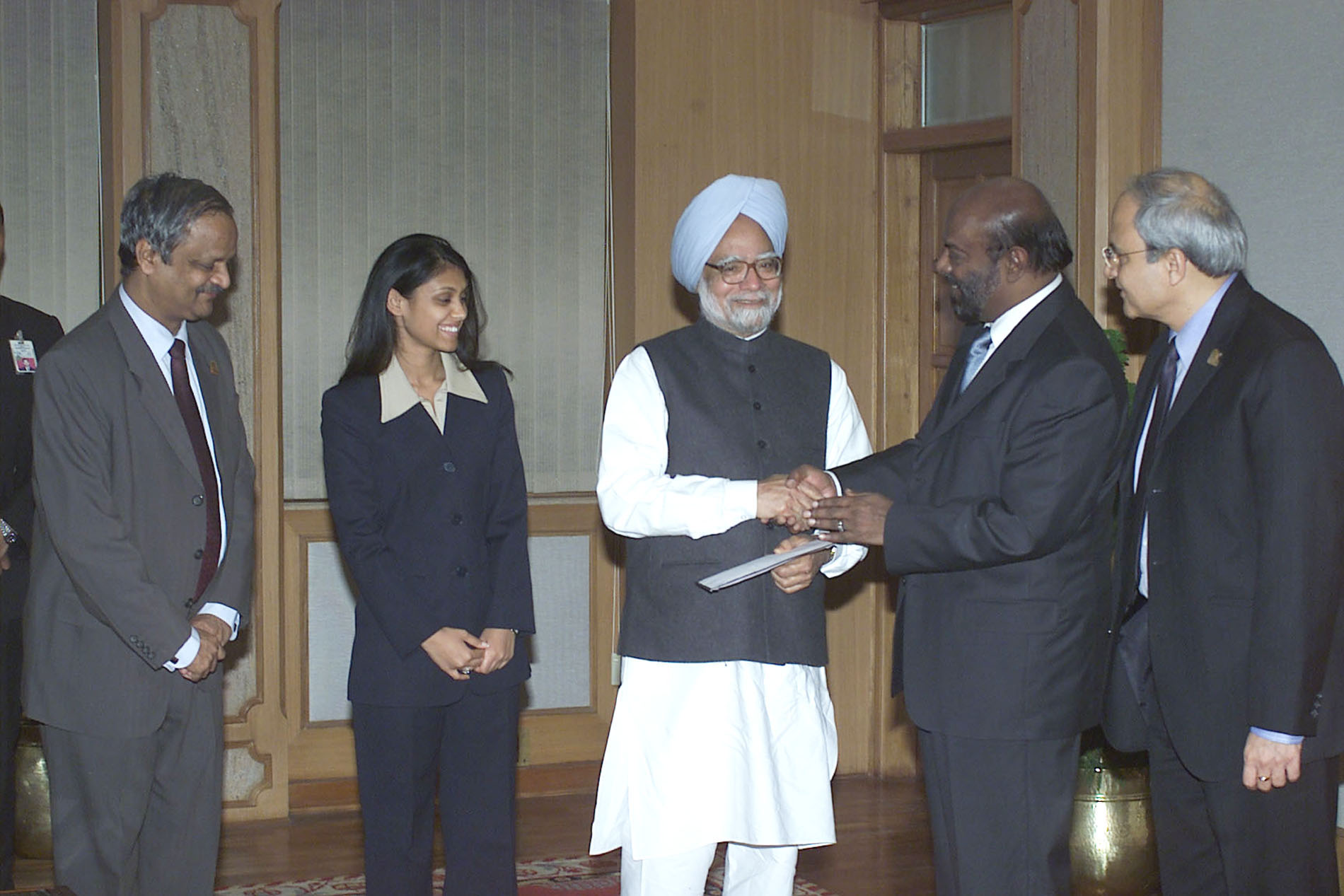
Shiv and Roshni Nadar in 2005 with the then Prime Minister Manmohan Singh

Roshni Nadar Malhotra (born 1981 or 1982) is an Indian businesswoman and philanthropist and the chairperson of HCL Technologies. She is the first woman to lead a listed IT company in India. She is the only child of HCL Group founder and 3rd richest person in India billionaire businessman Shiv Nadar. In 2024 and 2019, she was ranked 60th and 54th respectively on the Forbes World's 100 Most Powerful Women.

In 2023, Roshni ranked 60th in the Forbes list of World's 100 Most Powerful Women. She is also the CEO of HCL Corporation, the holding company of all HCL Group entities.

She additionally serves as Co-Conference Chair of the St. Gallen Symposium together with Lord Brian Griffiths and Dominic Barton.

== Early life and education ==
Roshni Nadar was born to Shiv Nadar, a businessman and founder of HCLTech, and Kiran Nadar, a philanthropist. Nadar grew up in Delhi and studied in Vasant Valley School and graduated from Northwestern University majoring in communication with a focus on Radio/TV/Film. She earned an MBA from the Kellogg School of Management.

== Career ==
She worked in various companies as a producer before joining HCL. Within a year of her joining HCL, she was elevated as executive director and CEO of HCL Corporation. She subsequently became the chairperson of HCL Technologies, after her father Shiv Nadar stepped down. In 2025, Nadar became the largest shareholder of HCL, after her father, Shiv, gifted her 47% of his share in HCL Technologies.

Prior to becoming CEO of the HCL Corporation, Roshni Nadar was a trustee of the Shiv Nadar Foundation, which runs the not-for-profit Sri Sivasubramaniya Nadar College of Engineering in Chennai. She is the chairperson of VidyaGyan Leadership Academy, a leadership academy for the economically underprivileged. She set up 'The Habitats' trust that aims at protecting India's natural habitats and indigenous species in a bid to create and conserve sustainable ecosystems.

== Personal life ==
Nadar is a trained classical musician. In 2010, she married Shikhar Malhotra, vice chairman of HCL Healthcare. They have two sons.

== Awards and recognition ==
Year	Title
2014	NDTV Young philanthropist of the Year.
2015	Conferred "The World's Most Innovative People Award" for Philanthropic Innovation by The World Summit on Innovation & Entrepreneurship (WSIE)
2017	Vogue India Philanthropist of the Year
2023	Ranked 60th on Forbes's list of World's 100 Most Powerful Women.
2023	Ranked 72nd on Fortune's list of Most Powerful Women in 2023.
2025	Hurun India 2025 Women Leaders List.

== Ancestry ==
Ancestors of Roshni Nadar

Sivasubramaniya Nadar
Shiv Nadar
Vamasundari Devi
Roshni Nadar
Kiran
