= QualPro =

American management consultancy

QualPro, Inc.
- Company type: Private
- Industry: Management consulting
- Founded: 1982
- Headquarters: Knoxville, Tennessee, US
- Key people: Charles Holland, Founder and Chief Executive Officer
- Services: Process Improvement Consulting
- Number of employees: 45
- Website: qualproinc.com

QualPro, Inc. is a Knoxville, Tennessee-based management consultancy that uses multivariable testing to simultaneously test a large number of ideas to improve business processes or performance. The firm gathers ideas from the client organization’s staff at all levels, eliminates those that don't meet its criteria, and evaluates the remaining ideas through experiments that test 20-30 variables simultaneously.

The company was founded in 1982 by Dr. Charles Holland, based on his work reducing defects in urethane foam used in nuclear weapons. He was influenced by prior work by British statisticians to improve anti-aircraft shells in World War II, the book The Design of Experiments, and his work supporting seminars with Edwards Deming. The company has designed experiments to determine the layout of the front page of the National Enquirer, to reduce defects and costs in DuPont's manufacturing plants and to assess the optimal format for Lowe's' newspaper advertising inserts.

== History ==
QualPro was founded in 1982 by Dr. Charles Holland. Holland previously worked for Union Carbide in the 1960s and 1970s at the Y-12 National Security Complex. They were producing carbon foam used in atomic bombs for the Atomic Energy Commission. 85 percent of the foam was defective and they were considering re-tooling the factory at a cost of $100 million. Instead, Holland questioned the workers and management team for ideas on how to decrease defects and tested 15 factors like the size and position of mixing blades. Holland’s multivariable experiments were based on the 1935 book The Design of Experiments and the work of two British statisticians that used multivariable testing to make better shells to shoot down German planes in World War II. The success rate of foam production increased from 15 percent to 60 percent, and eventually to 99 percent.

Holland published a paper on the topic, but according to Forbes, at first it went "largely unnoticed." He started helping Edwards Deming run four-day seminars on statistics in quality manufacturing. Deming was influential in the quality manufacturing movement, in particular among Japanese auto manufacturers. Deming urged Holland to start QualPro. Most of its first clients, such as Ford and Procter & Gamble, were referred to Holland from Deming.

The firm's early work was primarily for manufacturing companies. It expanded into marketing and advertising, healthcare and government in the 1990s. As of 2005, 60 percent of its clients were in service industries.

== Services ==
QualPro is a management consulting firm focused on implementing multivariable testing (MVT), a technique for designing experiments that test multiple variables simultaneously. QualPro uses it to test a large number of ideas on how to improve business processes or performance at the same time and to see how those ideas effect each other in different combinations.

The firm collects ideas from a client’s executives, front-line workers, or other departments and staff. The ideas are culled through based on three criterion: they must be cost-free, easy to try and something that can be done quickly. The remaining ideas are tested by statisticians in phases to find out which ideas have a positive impact on the output and which combinations of ideas have a greater effect. Out of 150,000 ideas that have been tested by QualPro, 53 percent have no significant impact, 22 percent make things worse and 25 percent result in improvements.

== Experiments ==
Some of QualPro's clients include DuPont, Williams-Sonoma, Inc., Allstate, Big Lots and AT&T. In 1996, QualPro conducted experiments for the National Enquirer to determine how 20 variables related to its cover, news-stand and in-store promotions effected sales. The firm tested 29 variables in Lowe's' newspaper inserts and 36 different versions of the insert's cover-page. They found that Lowe's could increase sales by featuring half as many products on the cover and that it could reduce the number of pages from 72 to 48 without an impact on sales. For AutoNation, the company tested 30 variables to improve the effectiveness of ads for local dealerships and found that the size of the ad and whether it was in color had no effect on its effectiveness, despite increased costs.

With help from QualPro, Boise Cascade discovered there was no connection between the quality of wood they purchased as raw material and the quality of wood pulp it produced for paper and packaging products. QualPro worked with Elo TouchSystems to find out why 25 percent of the touch-screens they manufactured had bubbles between the screen and coating. Statisticians identified three causes, which reduced the defects to less than 1 percent: the type of polyester, the coversheet shaping process and the type of adhesives used. A Unifi yarn plant worked with QualPro to identify ways to reduce the number of broken yarns. Out of the 25 quality improvement ideas Unifi had, testing found that five were effective.
