= Vision: The Journal of Business Perspective =

Vision
- Discipline: Business and management
- Language: English
- Edited by: Radha R. Sharma

Publication details
- History: Jan 2011
- Publisher: SAGE Publications
- Frequency: Quarterly
- Impact factor: 3.0 (2023)

Standard abbreviations
- ISO 4: Vision

Indexing
- ISSN: 0972-2629 (print); 2249-5304 (web)
- OCLC no.: 646552527

Links
- Journal homepage; Online access; Online archive

Vision: The Journal of Business Perspective is a quarterly peer-reviewed journal that focuses on all functional areas of management, including the economic and business environment. It is a platform for discussion and the exchange of ideas across the widest spectrum of scholarly opinions, promoting theoretical, empirical, and comparative research on problems confronting the business world.

The journal is published by SAGE Publications in association with the Management Development Institute. The journal is a member of the Committee on Publication Ethics (COPE). According to the Journal Citation Reports, the journal had a 2023 impact factor of 3.0.

== Abstracting and indexing ==
Vision: The Journal of Business Perspective is abstracted and indexed in:

- Australian Business Deans Council
- Chartered Association of Business Schools
- DeepDyve
- Dutch-KB
- EBSCO
- Emerging Sources Citation Index
- Global Institute for Scientific Information
- Indian Citation Index
- J-Gate
- OCLC
- Ohio
- Portico
- ProQuest: Business Premium Collection
- ProQuest: Central
- Research Papers in Economics
- SCOPUS
- UGC-CARE (GROUP II)

According to Scopus, it has a 2024 CiteScore of 4.6, ranking 161 out of 443 in the category "Business and International Management".
