= Anant Gupta =

Indian businessman (born 1965)

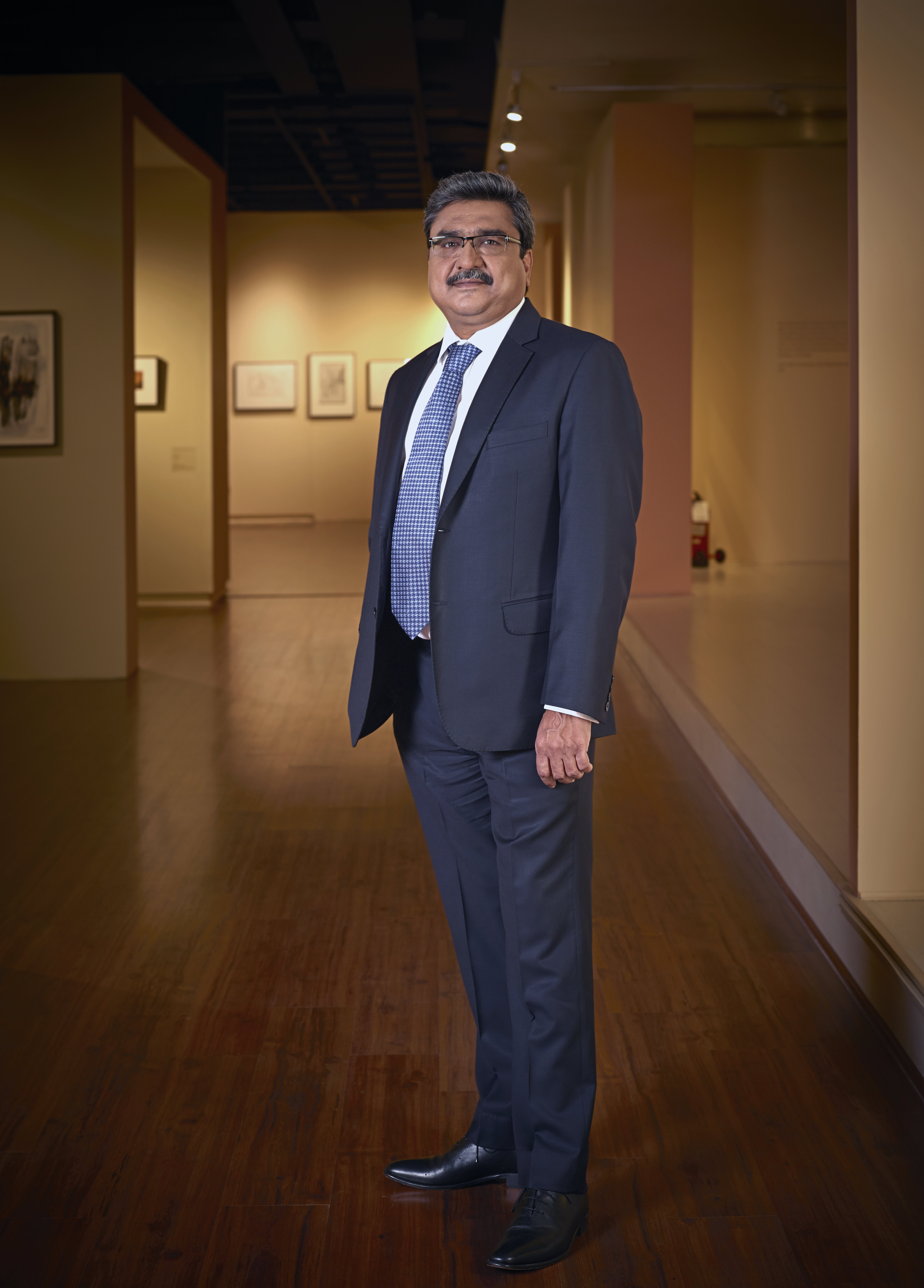
- Born: Delhi, India
- Citizenship: India
- Education: University of Bombay (B.Sc.); University of Liverpool (M.Sc.)
- Occupations: Founder Chairman & CEO, TECHCELX

Anant Gupta is Founder Chairman & CEO, TECHCELX, an integrated business acceleration and investment firm. He is also former President & Chief Executive Officer of HCL Technologies, a global information technology services company

== Early life ==
He schooled across the country including Don Bosco, Chennai, Bal Bharti Air Force School and Modern School in Delhi thanks to his father's travelling job.

Gupta obtained B.Sc. (Hons) Physics with Electronics from St. Xavier's College, University of Bombay in 1985 and M.Sc. (Engg) Microelectronics & Telecommunications, University of Liverpool, UK in 1987.

== Career ==
Gupta began his career with HCL in 1993. Since then he held a series of leadership positions in the company, most recently as CEO of the company. Prior to be appointed the CEO, he was President of HCL's Infrastructure Services Division.

Gupta left HCL on 20 October 2016 to start his own venture called TECHCELX which is an integrated business acceleration and investment firm focused on developing digital technology products & platforms.

== Industry contributions ==
Anant Gupta wrote "The Blackbook on the Remote Infrastructure Management (RIM) Industry-- Demystifying the third 'wave' of Outsourcing". He is a founding member of NASSCOM's RIM Forum.

Gupta serves as a Trustee of the HCLT Foundation. His efforts towards empowering women employees at HCL won him the "2014 Women’s Empowerment Principles (WEPs) Leadership Award – 7 Principles" from UN Women and UN Compact.

Gupta has also been a Task Force member of the New Energy Architecture project run by the World Economic Forum.
