= Kurt Salmon =

- Company type: Subsidiary
- Industry: Management consulting
- Founded: 1935; 91 years ago
- Headquarters: Atlanta, U.S.
- Key people: Brooks Kitchel (Chief Executive Officer); Madison Riley (Chief Operating Officer)
- Products: Management consulting services
- Number of employees: 500+
- Parent: Accenture
- Website: www.kurtsalmon.com

Kurt Salmon was a global management and strategy consulting firm formed by the merger of Ineum Consulting and Kurt Salmon Associates (KSA) in January 2011:

- Ineum Consulting was formed as a spin-off from Deloitte France's consulting division, and was specialized in corporate strategy, organization, and information systems issues. By the time of the merger, the firm had approximately 1,300 employees in Algeria, Australia, France, Belgium, Morocco, Luxembourg, the Netherlands, Switzerland, Tunisia, United Kingdom and the United States.
- KSA, specialized in the retail, consumer goods and health care sectors, was among the first consulting firms established in the United States (in the early 1930s).

Kurt Salmon was part of Management Consulting Group which was listed on the London Stock Exchange.

In November 2016, Kurt Salmon was acquired by Accenture Strategy.

== History ==
=== Formation ===
The firm was officially founded as Kurt Salmon Associates (KSA) in 1935 by Kurt Salmon, a German-Jewish immigrant from Cologne. Salmon was professionally educated at Chemnitz Textile University and visited the United States in 1930 at the urging of his father to gain experience in the emerging economy of the United States. Although he did not originally intend to stay in the United States, he was favorably impressed with the culture and decided to stay on. After a series of engineering projects with two hosiery companies, he formed his own consulting firm to redesign manufacturing processes in the needle trade. Although operated as a partnership, KSA was legally organized as a Delaware Corporation owned solely by the principals of the firm.

=== Early years ===
KSA expanded slowly over its first decade of operation. In these early years, the company established an ethic of diligence and quality in client work. Salmon himself was a stickler for details, and this would become a fundamental part of the firm's cultural fabric. One of the firm's first hires was Karl Striegel, a Carnegie Institute engineer who would become Salmon's primary partner in building the business. The two men worked closely together over the next 25 years as KSA expanded from a dozen to more than 200 professional staff.

By the 1960s KSA was the consulting leader in improving manufacturing operations in the soft goods industry sector. Kurt Salmon personally set the tone for the culture. Externally, Karl Striegel drove the commercial side of the business with clients. Many senior colleagues still recall this period as among the Golden Years of KSA.

The 1970s brought great changes to the firm. The manufacturing basis of the soft goods sector had been steadily migrating out of the United States to lower labor cost location, both in South America and in the Asia-Pacific. KSA's U.S.-based practice in the operations and manufacturing sectors increasingly lost relevance as this trend continued, and the firm shifted emphasis to retail, logistics and sourcing services to compensate, and also opened an office in Hong Kong. The 70s proved a time of strategic exploration as the new leadership team of Stig Kry, CEO, and Jack Ullman, president, sought to diversify KSA's offering into new industry sectors. Despite forays into the hospitality, mining, furniture and health care industries, the firm was unsuccessful at sustaining viable positions outside the soft goods sector. Coupled with the recession of 1970–71, the firm contracted greatly in revenues and profitability. Before the decade had ended both Salmon and Striegel, the founding generation owners and the first two chairmen of KSA, had retired, marking the end of an era.

=== Merger with Ineum Consulting ===
KSA's services and economics continued to change significantly over the course of the 1980s and into the early 1990s. The new generation of owners led by David Cole, CEO, and Barry Moore, president, Ronald Brockett, vice president, redefined the firm's strategy, organization and compensation. While retail and consumer products remained the mainstay industry expertise of KSA, the firm was finally successful in a new industry sector with the acquisition of the Hamilton Associates health care boutique in 1986. The firm additionally developed true advisory services in such areas as strategy to accompany the traditional implementation practices. Firm economics were upgraded, and KSA embarked on a global expansion supported by the buoyant 1990s market for consulting services. In particular, KSA expanded its offerings in information systems planning and implementation, and developed expertise and alliances across a range of software such as SAP.

While KSA had made the transition from a single-offering engineering specialist to a top line management advisory practice, the internal financing of the firm did not advance at a comparable pace. The capital available from the Principals to finance global growth was limited and this resource base was further stressed by several costly expansion initiatives in the information technology implementation market. To compound matters, the KSA board voted to revalue the book stock of the company in 1999 and established a new formula value, further stressing the internal financing capability of the principals. Although the firm would continue to be privately owned under the new formula for several more years, it became clear the structure was not sustainable and the principals voted unanimously to sell KSA's equity to Management Consulting Group or MCG in 2007. As part of the transaction the KSA Principals assumed a significant shareholding position in MCG, a publicly traded company on the London Stock Exchange.

On 1 January 2011, KSA merged with Ineum Consulting, another consultancy of MCG, to form Kurt Salmon.

Kurt Salmon successfully built a consumer financial services practice in 2013.

=== Scission ===
MCG began to shop the sale of its financial services practice beginning in 2014. Kurt Salmon's European business, as well as its entire financial services practice (excluding retail and consumer goods consulting), was sold by MCG to Solucom and was rebranded as Wavestone in July 2016. In July 2016, Kurt Salmon's health care practice joined ECG Management Consultants. The sale of the final remaining business unit, Kurt Salmon's consumer group, to Accenture was announced Sept 22, 2016.
