= Shiv Nadar =

Indian businessman (born 1945)

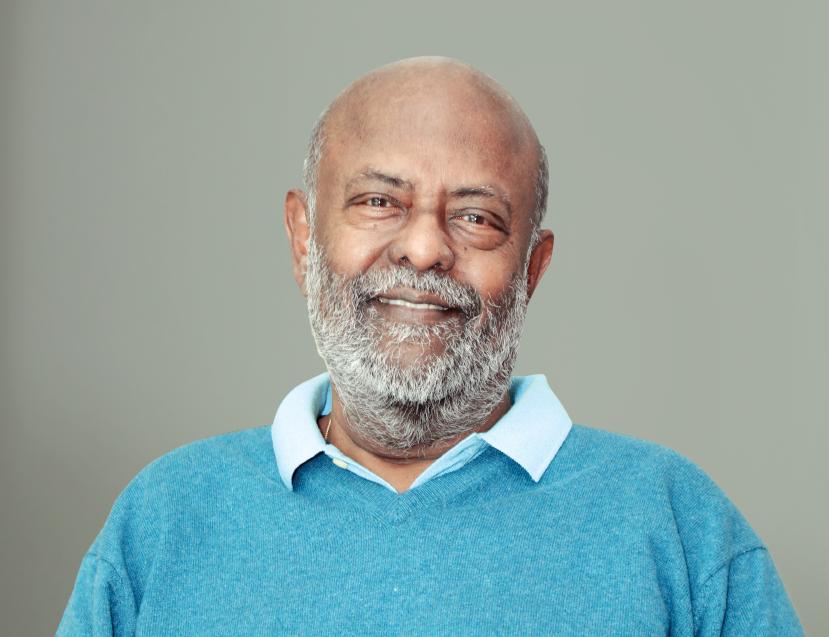
- Born: 14 July 1945 (age 81); Moolaipozhi, Madras Presidency, British India
- Education: PSG College of Technology
- Occupations: Founder, HCLTech, SSN College of Engineering, Shiv Nadar University, and Shiv Nadar University, Chennai
- Spouse: Kiran Nadar
- Children: Roshni Nadar Malhotra
- Relatives: S. N. Balakrishnan (brother)
- Awards: Padma Bhushan (2008)

Shiv Nadar (born 14 July 1945) is an Indian billionaire businessman and philanthropist. He is the founder and chairman of HCL Technologies, and is chairman of the Shiv Nadar Foundation. Nadar founded HCL in 1976 and transformed the IT hardware company into an IT enterprise over the next three decades.

In 2008, Nadar was awarded the Padma Bhushan for his efforts in the IT industry. Nadar, nicknamed by friends as Magus (Old Persian for "wizard"), since the mid-1990s he has focused his efforts on developing the educational system of India through the Shiv Nadar Foundation. According to Forbes, he has an estimated net worth of US$34.1 billion as of 26 March 2025, making him one of the richest people in the world.

In FY 25, Shiv Nadar and Family donated Rs 2708 crores through Shiv Nadar Foundation.

== Early life ==
Nadar was born in Moolaipozhi village, Madras Presidency (present day Thoothukudi district, Tamil Nadu) into a Tamil family. His parents were Sivasubramaniya Nadar and Vamasundari Devi. His mother, Vamasundari Devi, is the sister of S. P. Adithanar, founder of Dina Thanthi newspaper.

Nadar studied at Town Higher Secondary School, Kumbakonam. He also studied in the Elango Corporation Higher Secondary School, Madurai. He was admitted into the first form (Sixth Standard) in June 1955 and continued his education in Town High School until June 1957. Later, he joined St. Joseph Boys Higher Secondary School, Trichy, and completed high school education here. Nadar received a pre-university degree in the American College, Madurai and a degree in Electrical Engineering from PSG College of Technology, Coimbatore in 1967.

== Career ==
Nadar began his career at Walchand group's Cooper Engineering Ltd. in Pune in 1967. he soon gave it up to begin his own venture, in partnerships with several friends and colleagues. These partners were Ajai Chowdhry (Ex-Chairman, HCL), Arjun Malhotra (CEO and chairman, Headstrong), Subhash Arora, Yogesh Vaidya, S. Raman, Mahendra Pratap and DS Puri.

The initial enterprise that Nadar and his partners began was Microcomp, a company that focused on selling teledigital calculators in the Indian market. HCL was founded in 1976, with an investment of ₹187,000 (equivalent to ₹6.2 million or US$66,000 in 2026).

In 1980, HCL ventured into the international market with the opening of Far East Computers in Singapore to sell IT hardware. The venture reported ₹1 million (equivalent to ₹25 million or US$270,000 in 2026) in revenue in the first year and continued to address the Singapore operations. Nadar remained the largest shareholder without retaining any management control.

In Aug 2020, Nadar handed over to his daughter Roshni Nadar, who became the first woman chair of a listed Indian IT company. In July 2021, Nadar also stepped down as managing director of HCL Technologies, and was succeeded by C Vijayakumar, HCL Tech CEO, for a five-year term.

In October 2021, he was ranked by Forbes magazine as the third richest person in India with an estimated net worth of US$31 billion.

== Focus on education ==
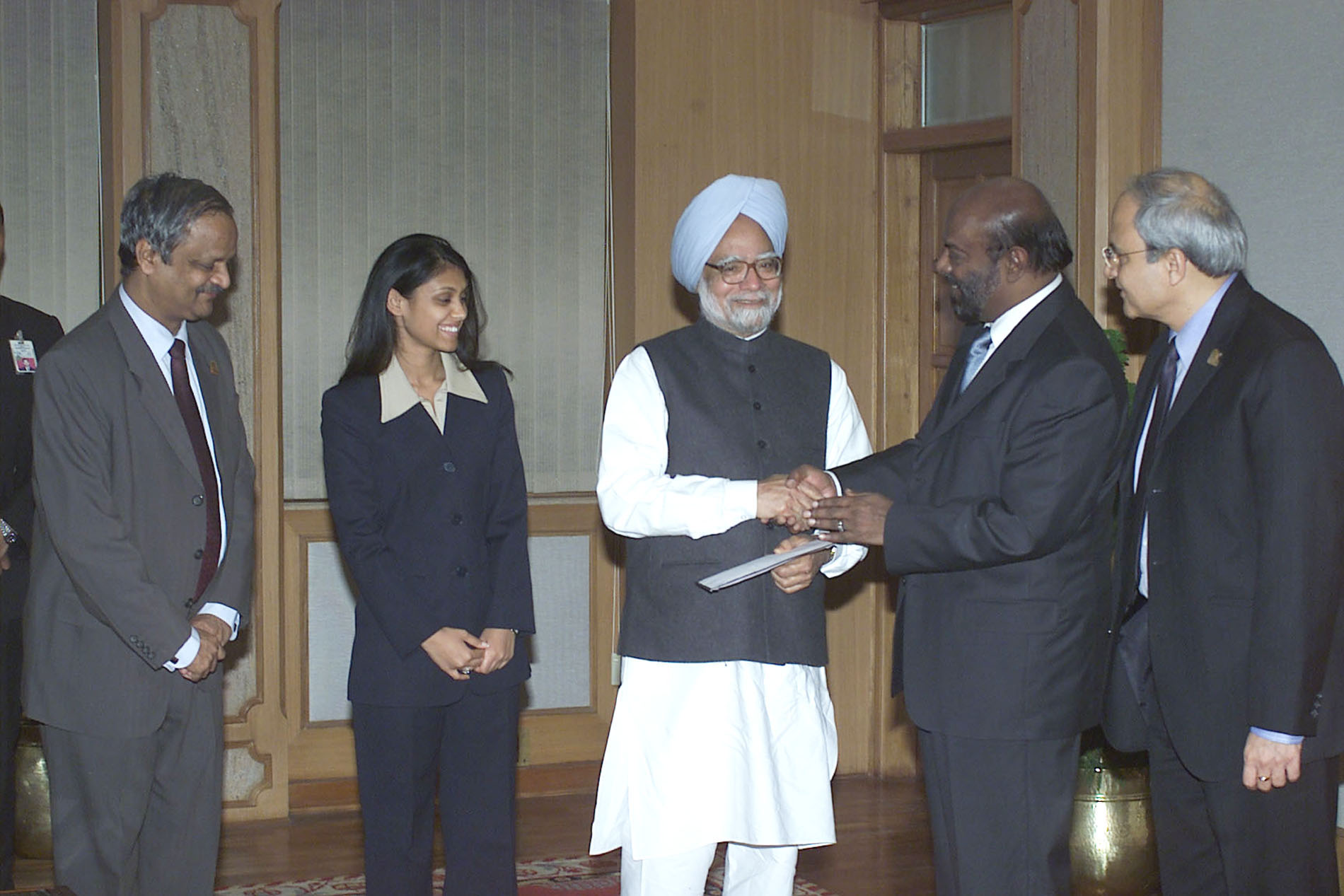
Shiv and Roshni Nadar presenting a cheque of ₹40 million (US$907,029.48) to the Prime Minister Manmohan Singh, towards the Prime Minister's National Relief Fund in New Delhi on 17 January 2005

In 1996, Nadar founded SSN College of Engineering in Chennai, Tamil Nadu in the name of his father, Sivasubramaniya Nadar. Nadar took an active role in the college activities, including the gifting of ₹1 million (equivalent to ₹4.3 million or US$46,000 in 2026) worth of HCL shares to the college. In 2006, Nadar announced that the college will promote research apart from ensuring that students benefit from foreign university tie-ups. Nadar joined the executive board of Indian School of Business in 2005. In March 2008, Nadar's SSN Trust announced the setting up of two Vidyagyan schools in Uttar Pradesh for rural students, where free scholarship for 200 students from 50 districts of the state. He visited Town Higher Secondary School in February 2011 and donated computers and other equipment worth ₹8 million (equivalent to ₹18 million or US$190,000 in 2026). He was chairman of the board of governors, Indian Institute of Technology Kharagpur (IIT Kharagpur or IIT-KGP), a technical institute until 2014.

In 2025, it was announced that SSN College of Engineering will be merged with Shiv Nadar University.

== Personal life ==
Nadar's daughter Roshni Nadar is now chairwoman of HCL. She was the manager of HCL when Nadar started it in the 1990s.

His wife, Kiran Nadar, is an art collector and philanthropist. Nadar and his wife are active bridge players and sponsors of the HCL Bridge Tournament in India. Nadar topped the list of most generous donors of 2024 as he donated nearly rupees 6 crore every day in the year.

== Awards and accolades ==
- In 2008, the Government of India awarded him with a Padma Bhushan, the third highest civilian award, for his contribution to the IT industry.
- In 2007, Madras University awarded him an honorary doctorate degree.
- Shiv Nadar was awarded E&Y Entrepreneur of the Year 2007 (Services).
- In 2011, he was counted amongst Forbes' 48 Heroes of Philanthropy in Asia Pacific.
- In April 2017, India Today magazine ranked Nadar #16th in India's 50 Most Powerful People of 2017 list.
- Shiv Nadar has committed more than $1 billion to philanthropy.
