= V. Kasturi Rangan =

American economist

V. Kasturi Rangan is an American economist currently the Malcolm P. McNair Professor of Marketing at Harvard Business School.
