= Proudfoot (company) =

- Type: Private
- Industry: Management consulting services
- Founded: Chicago, USA, 1946
- Headquarters: London, United Kingdom
- Key people: Neil O'Brien (Chairman & CEO)
- Website: www.proudfoot.com

Proudfoot is a consulting company. The company provides professional services across a wide range of industries and sectors.

== Naming ==
The company was originally named Alexander Proudfoot PLC, after its founder. In 1993 it shortened its name to Proudfoot PLC. In January 2001 it changed its name to the current name of Management Consulting Group, PLC.

== Timeline ==
- 1946 - Mr Alexander "Alec" Proudfoot founded the Alexander Proudfoot Company in Chicago, USA. He led the business until his death in 1968, when the company was bought from his widow by senior management.
- 1960s - Proudfoot began its expansion from Chicago, first in the USA and then in collaboration with Unibanco in Brazil.
- 1970s - Proudfoot began operations in Europe, and opened a London office.
- 1980s - To expand its global scope Proudfoot opened a Singapore branch, followed by one in Sydney shortly afterwards. By the late eighties Proudfoot had offices across the Asia-Pacific region.
- 1989 - Alexander Proudfoot PLC purchased Philip Crosby Associates, then a US Stock Exchange publicly traded company. This company deteriorated in the mid-1990s, closed in 1996 and partially resold in 1997 to its original owner.
- 1991 - Alexander Proudfoot PLC took over from Indevo, a strategy consultancy with its Stockholm head office. Part of the business was sold and the remainder closed in 1993.
- 1993 - Proudfoot PLC changed its name to Proudfoot PLC.
- 2000 - IMR Europe, a Proudfoot clone with significant presence in France and Spain, was bought by Proudfoot PLC.
- 2001 - The name of Proudfoot PLC was changed to Management Consulting Group PLC.

== Proudfoot ==
=== Overview ===
Proudfoot is a consulting company named after its founder, Alexander Proudfoot, that was founded in Chicago, Illinois during 1946. Over its history it has also opened offices in South Africa, Hong Kong, Brazil, Canada, France, Germany, Chile, UK and Mexico City. The company was initially known as Proudfoot Consulting PLC, and changed its name to that of its founder in 2009. The company provides strategies for improving the financial and operational infrastructure of client companies. Industries that the company has worked within include the defense industry, automotive industry, banking and construction sectors, insurance, life sciences, mining, oil and gas, manufacturing and retail, telecommunications, and transportation. The firm works with private and public companies, and is hired to improve the efficiency of those companies over either short-term or long-term contracts. Its CEO is Neil O'Brien and the executive chairman is Nick Stagg.

=== Studies ===
Proudfoot also produces studies regarding workforce dynamics. A 2007 study by the firm showed that during that year, the manufacturing sector had a 37% rate of unproductive work force time, and that worldwide companies were 29% below optimum productive efficiency. Further studies by the firm showing non-productivity have shown that the fault is not always with the employees, and that often the lack of productivity is the result of bad or faulty management. In 2009 a study by Alexander Proudfoot showed that on average a salesperson only spends one fifth of their day actually prospecting or closing sales, and usually believes they have spent twice the time they actually have on sales work.

== See also ==
- OC&C Strategy Consultants
