= The Saint Consulting Group =

- Company type: Private company
- Industry: Management consultancy
- Founded: 1983
- Founder: P. Michael Saint
- Defunct: 2019
- Fate: Unknown
- Headquarters: Hingham, Massachusetts, United States
- Area served: United States
- Products: Block development campaigns, land use fights
- Number of employees: 90+ (2008)
- Website: tscg.biz Archived November 8, 2018, at the Wayback Machine

The Saint Consulting Group (TSCG) was a privately held management consulting firm based in Hingham, Massachusetts. The Saint Consulting Group worked in land use consulting, generating public support to help companies navigate the local governmental approval process. The firm is reported to have had annual revenues of $30 million by providing political experts, media experts, and lawyers on behalf of casinos, colleges, grocery and retail chains, medical groups, utilities, and heavy industries.

Saint specializes in using political-campaign tactics, such as petition drives, phone banks, door-to-door discussions, and websites, to support or oppose controversial projects, such as oil refineries, shopping centers, quarries, and landfills.

As of 2008, the company employed approximately 90 land use experts in 10 offices in the United States and an international office in London, England. Consulting Magazine named Saint Consulting one of their "7 Small Jewels" in 2007. The annual "Small Jewels" list highlights exceptional firms with less than 250 employees.

== History ==
P. Michael Saint is a graduate of College of the Holy Cross with a degree in political science, he earned his master's in business administration from the Owen Graduate School of Management at Vanderbilt University. Saint, a Boston native, previously worked as journalist before serving as the press officer for former Massachusetts lieutenant governor Thomas P. O'Neill III (son of Tip, former U.S. House Speaker).

After serving on O'Neill's staff, Saint founded Saint Consulting in 1983 as a one-man operation, doing public relations and political work. He began to focus on land use in the mid-1990s and met Patrick Fox, who was running political campaigns in Massachusetts.

== Business ==
According to an article in The Wall Street Journal, Saint Consulting has conducted about 1,500 campaigns in 44 states. Approximately 500 of those campaigns have been to block a development; many opposition campaigns have been clandestine. Many of Saint's covert projects oppose new Walmart stores, by funding local opposition groups and paid for by Walmart's competitors or unions who oppose the non-union Walmart. Funding typically comes from large rival supermarket chains.

As of 2009, Saint is currently working on 135 cases in the U.S., UK and Canada. As of 2006, the company had about 55 employees, most with backgrounds in grassroots political campaigns.

In 2009, three members of the Saint Consulting Group, Mike Saint, Robert J. Flavell, and Patrick F. Fox wrote the book Nimby Wars.
