= Linda A. Hill =

American ethnographer

Linda A. Hill is an American ethnographer currently the Wallace Brett Donham Professor of Business Administration at Harvard Business School.

== Bibliography ==
- Linda A. Hill (25 April 2003). Becoming a Manager: How New Managers Master the Challenges of Leadership (1st ed.). Harvard Business Review Press. ISBN 978-1633696969.
- Linda A. Hill (19 March 2019). Becoming a Manager: How New Managers Master the Challenges of Leadership (2nd ed.). Harvard Business Review Press. ISBN 978-1633696969.
- Linda A. Hill; Kent Lineback (11 January 2011). Being the Boss: The 3 Imperatives for Becoming a Great Leader. Harvard Business Review Press. ISBN 978-1-63369-212-1.
- Linda A. Hill; Greg Brandeau; Emily Truelove; Kent Lineback (10 June 2014). Collective Genius: The Art and Practice of Leading Innovation. Harvard Business Review Press. ISBN 978-1422130025.
