= HCLTech =

Indian multinational technology company

HCL Technologies Limited (HCLTech)

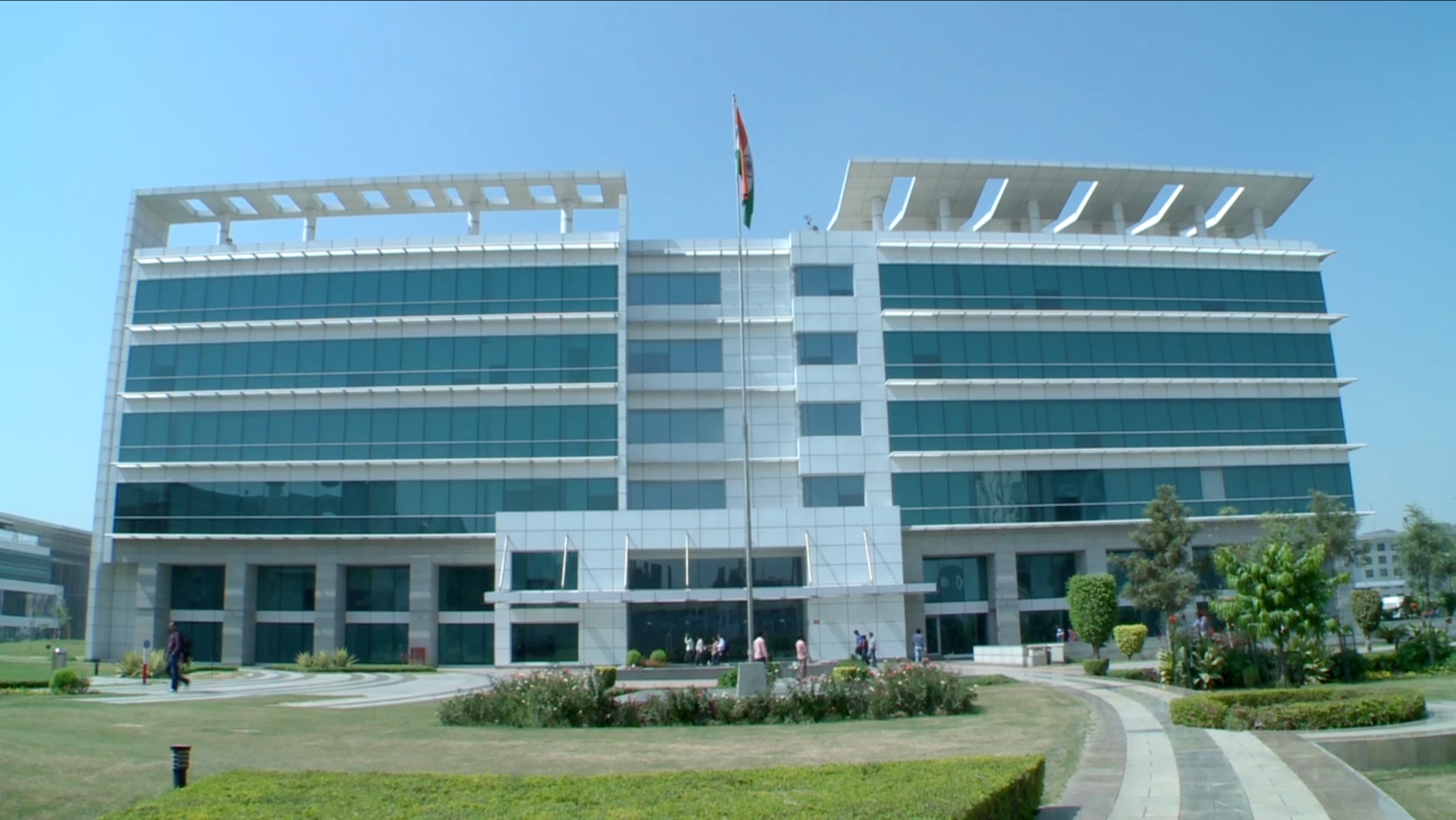
- Headquarters in Noida
- Formerly: HCL Overseas Limited (1991–1994); HCL Consulting Limited (1994–1999)
- Type: Public
- Traded as: BSE: HCLTECH; NSE: HCLTECH; BSE SENSEX constituent; NSE NIFTY 50 constituent
- ISIN: INE860A01027
- Industry: Information technology
- Founded: 12 November 1991; 35 years ago
- Founder: Shiv Nadar
- Headquarters: Noida, Uttar Pradesh, India
- Area served: Worldwide
- Key people: Roshni Nadar Malhotra (Chairperson); Shiv Nadar (Chairman Emeritus); C Vijayakumar (CEO & Managing Director)
- Services: AI; Engineering; Digital; Cloud; Software
- Revenue: ▲₹130,144 crore (US$14 billion) (2026)
- Operating income: ▲₹22,397 crore (US$2.4 billion) (2026)
- Net income: ▼₹16,642 crore (US$1.8 billion) (2026)
- Total assets: ▲₹116,258 crore (US$12 billion) (2026)
- Total equity: ▲₹75,197 crore (US$8.0 billion) (2026)
- Owner: Shiv Nadar (60.77%)
- Number of employees: ▲227,181 (March 2026)
- Parent: HCL Group
- Subsidiaries: Actian; HCL Axon; Starschema; Confinale; ASAP Group; Zeenea
- Website: www.hcltech.com
- Footnotes; Financials as of 31 March 2026.

HCL Technologies Limited (HCLTech) is an Indian multinational technology company headquartered in Noida, Uttar Pradesh. It was spun out of HCL Group in 1991 when HCL entered into the software services business. Founded by Shiv Nadar, the company maintains a presence in 60 countries, while it employs over 230,000 individuals. Additionally, it is the third-largest India-headquartered IT services company by revenue and market capitalization. The company unveiled its brand identity "HCLTech", underpinned by the distinct positioning of Supercharging Progress™, in 2022.

In 2025, HCLTech was named the highest-ranked India-headquartered technology company for the second consecutive year in TIME magazine's World’s Best Companies list. It has also been included in TIME's World's Most Sustainable Companies list for the second consecutive year in 2026, placing it among the top five global professional companies. In 2026, HCLTech was named to Fortune magazine’s World’s Most Admired Companies list in the IT services category.

== History ==
=== Formation and early years ===
The company originally focused on hardware, but software and services became the main focus through HCL Technologies. On 12 November 1991, HCL Technologies was spun off as a separate unit, being incorporated as HCL Overseas Limited, a provider of software and technology development services.

In 1993, the company also started providing enterprise IT infrastructure management services, winning an order to establish India's first floorless, electronic stock exchange for NSE.

In July 1994, the company name was changed to HCL Consulting Limited. On 6 October 1999, the company was renamed 'HCL Technologies Limited' for "a better reflection of its activities."

Between 1991 and 1999, the company expanded its IT services capacities to US, European and APAC markets.

=== IPO and subsequent expansion ===
HCLTech celebrated the 25th anniversary of its IPO in 2025

HCLTech went public on 11 January 2000, with an issue of 14.2 million shares. By the early 2000s, its wholly owned subsidiary HCL Comnet had expanded its offerings from VSAT to include network security and IT infrastructure services.

In 2001, HCLTech formed a joint venture with Deutsche Bank by acquiring a 51% stake in the latter's Indian subsidiary Deutsche Software (later renamed DSL Software). In 2004, HCLTech bought out the remaining 49% stake in DSL Software, which then became part of HCL's banking technology division.

In 2003, HCLTech won a contract to develop embedded software for Airbus A340's flight warning system. That same year, the company sold its entire stake in HCL Perot Systems, a seven-year-old IT services company, to joint venture partner Perot Systems for over $105 million.

In 2005, HCLTech expanded its operations in Northern Ireland. At the 2006 UK Trade and Investment India Business Awards in New Delhi, then-UK Prime Minister Tony Blair announced the expansion.

In 2008, HCLTech acquired the UK-based consultancy Axon Group for £440 million and merged the company's enterprise application services (EAS) division into Axon. In the three years following the acquisition, the EAS division's revenue share within HCL increased from 9% to 22%.

In October 2017, IBM and HCLTech announced a strategic partnership, with the latter taking over the development of IBM Lotus Software's Notes, Domino, Sametime and Verse collaboration tools.

In 2018, US-based Actian was acquired by HCLTech and Sumeru Equity Partners for $330 million. In 2021, HCL America acquired the remaining 19.6% stake in Actian for $100.2 million, transforming Actian into HCLSoftware's data & analytics division, but keeping it as an independent company.

In 2019, HCL Technologies acquired products of IBM including AppScan, BigFix, Commerce, Connections, Digital Experience (Portal and Content Manager), Notes/Domino, and Unica.

In 2021, the company reached $10 billion in revenue.

In 2023, HCLTech acquired ASAP Group, a German automotive engineering company, for $279 million. In August 2023, HCLTech signed a $2.1 billion managed network services deal with Verizon Business.

In May 2024, HCLTech announced the acquisition of select assets of Communications Technology Group, a business division of Hewlett Packard Enterprise (HPE), for $225 million.

In June 2026, it picked up a 10.5% stake in Indian AI startup Sarvam for $150.7 million. In 2026, the company entered the data center business to offer full-stack AI services.

== Acquisitions ==
Acquisition date	Company	Business	Country	Ref.
29 October 2001	Apollo Contact Centre	Business process outsourcing	United Kingdom	
3 June 2002	Gulf Computers Inc.	Application development	United States	
20 September 2004	DSL Software	Banking software	India	
13 October 2004	Shipara Technologies	Product engineering and embedded systems	India	
17 February 2005	Aquila Technologies	Engineering software	India	
20 February 2008	Capital Stream Inc.	Business process automation	United States	
16 July 2008	Liberata Financial Service	Business process outsourcing	United Kingdom	
25 August 2008	Control Point Solutions, Inc.	Telecommunications service	United States	
15 December 2008	Axon Group	SAP consulting	United Kingdom	
16 July 2009	UCS Group's SAP division	SAP consulting	South Africa	
19 October 2015	Concept to Silicon Systems (C2SiS)	Semiconductors	India	
20 October 2015	Volvo's external IT division	IT services	Sweden	
29 October 2015	PowerObjects	CRM consulting	United States	
2 April 2016	Geometric Ltd	PLM and engineering services	India	
21 October 2016	Butler America Aerospace	Engineering and design services	United States	
25 April 2017	Urban Fulfillment Services, LLC	Business process outsourcing	United States	
5 September 2017	ETL Factory Limited (Datawave)	Automation	United Kingdom	
12 April 2018	Actian	Data analytics	United States	
27 June 2018	H&D International Group	IT and engineering services	Germany	
13 March 2019	Strong-Bridge Envision	IT consulting	United States	
9 September 2019	Sankalp Semiconductor	Technology design services	India	
21 September 2020	DWS Ltd	IT services	Australia	
14 January 2022	Starschema	Data services	Hungary/United States	
9 May 2022	Confinale AG	Digital banking and wealth management consulting	Switzerland	
9 May 2022	Quest Informatics	Industry 4.0 and internet of things	India	
13 July 2023	ASAP Group	Automotive engineering services	Germany	
23 May 2024	HPE's CTG division	Telco solutions	United States	
9 August 2024	Zeenea	Data management and analytics	France	
20 February 2026	Wobby	Software	Belgium	
6 March 2026	Finergic	Wealth Consulting	Singapore	
2 July 2026	Jaspersoft	Software	United States	
31 July 2026	Guardian India Operations	Financial Services	United States	
3 August 2026	HPE Telco Solutions	Telco Solutions	United States	

== Operations ==
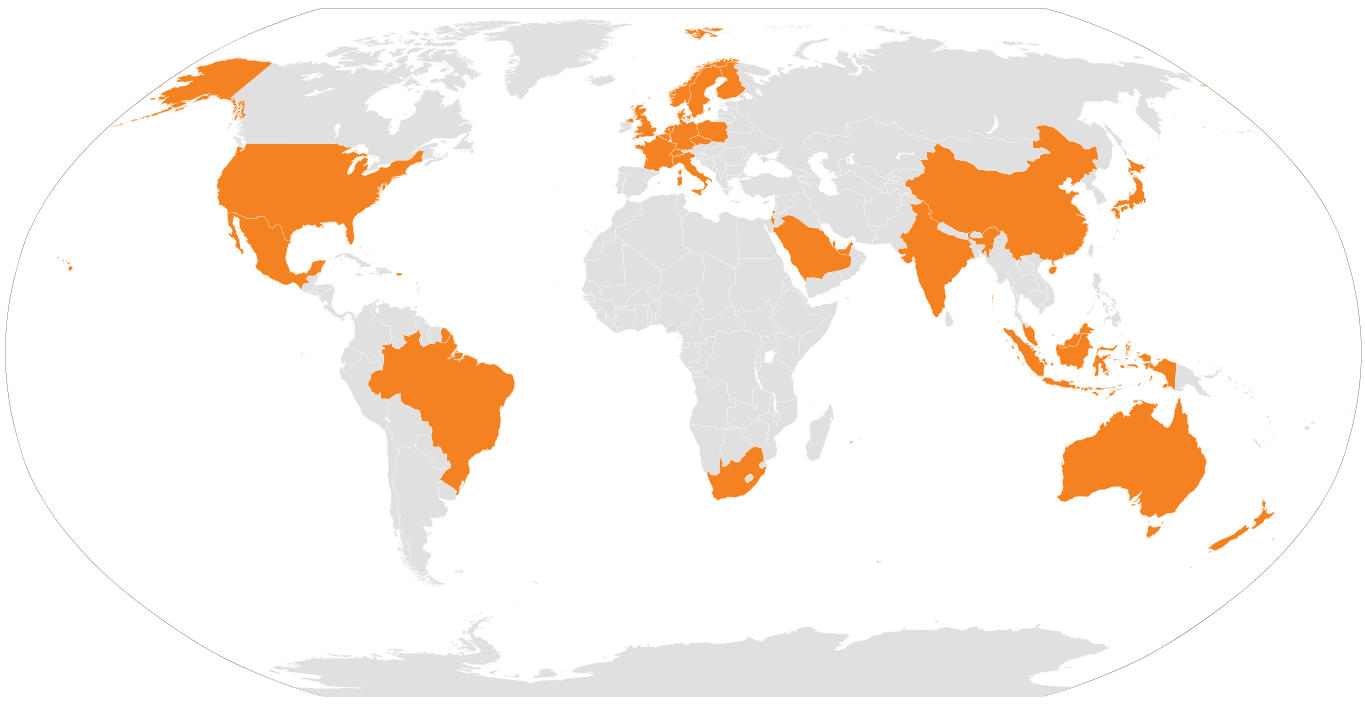
Countries where HCL has offices (circa 2015).

HCLTech operates in 60 countries and has more than 200 delivery centers and 70+ labs. Its headquarters are in Noida, India. The USA is the company's largest market, accounting for 56.3% of its revenue, followed by Europe at 27.8%, as of March, 2026. The company provides services in the fields of AI, Engineering, Digital, Cloud, and Software. HCLTech's business is divided into three segments: IT and Business Services (ITBS), Engineering and R&D Services (ERS), and HCLSoftware.

Old logo of the company which was used until 2022

=== HCLSoftware ===
In 2019, HCL Technologies started a software product division called HCLSoftware, after completing the acquisition of IBM's select software products. Notable products under HCLSoftware include HCL AppScan, HCL BigFix, HCL Connections, HCL Commerce, HCL Digital Experience, HCL Sametime, HCL Notes, Domino, and HCL Unica. As for Actian, their data & analytics division, notable products include HCL Informix, Actian Data Platform, Actian Ingres, Actian Zen, Actian NoSQL and Zeenea. HCLSoftware reported annual recurring revenue of ₹11,986 crore (US$1.3 billion) in fiscal year 2025–26.

In 2024, HCLSoftware entered into a partnership with India's Department for Promotion of Industry and Internal Trade (DPIIT) as part of the Manufacturing Incubation Initiative. Under the partnership, HCLSoftware launched the HCL SYNC program, which provided participating startups with opportunities for international exposure. The initiative was associated with the Government of India's Make in India program and focused on supporting the development and commercialization of domestic intellectual property.

=== Employees ===
As of September 30, 2026, HCLTech had 230,000 employees worldwide, representing 164 nationalities. The company has been recognized as a Global Top Employer and was recognized by Forbes as one of America’s Best Employers for New Grads for the third consecutive year in 2026.

HCLTech has had four CEOs since its inception:

CEO	Tenure
Shiv Nadar	1976–2007
Vineet Nayar	2007–2013
Anant Gupta	2013–2016
C Vijayakumar	2016–present

== HCL Group ==
HCLTech is the flagship company of the HCL Group. Another HCL Group company, HCL Infosystems, was formed in 1976 to produce calculators. HCL Infosystems later became one of the leading manufacturers of personal computers and laptops in India, but it eventually lost market share to foreign competitors like HP and Dell, and shut down its manufacturing division.

In February 2014, HCL Group launched HCL Healthcare, which provides corporate health services. HCL TalentCare is the fourth venture of HCL Group, which provided skilling and staffing services.

In 2026, India Chip Private Ltd, HCL Group’s joint venture with Taiwan’s Foxconn, launched a chip manufacturing facility in Jewar, Uttar Pradesh.

== HCLFoundation ==
HCLFoundation is the CSR arm of HCL Technologies in India. As of March 2026, it has invested around ₹1,984 crores in social and environmental programs. Its initiatives include the HCLTech Grant. Samuday, Uday, My Clean City and Harit. Through Sports for Change, it has reached over 64,000 athletes, out of which 25 para athletes have represented India internationally. Through My E-Haat, HCLFoundation has supported over 5,000 artisans in diverse craft traditions across 10 states.

== Sports Partnerships ==
HCLTech has served as the Official Digital Technology Partner of Cricket Australia since 2019, supporting the governing body's digital platforms and fan experiences. In the United States, HCLTech is the Digital Transformation Partner of MetLife Stadium, home to the New York Giants and New York Jets, and expanded the relationship in 2026 to include an AI partnership. In 2026, HCLTech also became the Official Digital Experience Partner of the DP World Tour, leading a multi-year transformation of the golf tour's digital ecosystem and fan-facing platforms.

== See also ==
- Big Tech (India)
- List of IT consulting firms
- List of public listed software companies of India
- Information technology in India
- List of Indian IT companies
