= Messemer =

Messemer is a surname. Notable people with the surname include:

- Hannes Messemer (1924–1991), German actor
- Jim Messemer (born 1958), American soccer goalkeeper
- Michael J. B. Messemer (1851–1894), American coroner of New York County

== See also ==
- Messmer (disambiguation)
- Mesmer (disambiguation)
