= International School of Information Management =

Coordinates: 12.314325°N 76.621552°E

International School of Information Management (ISiM)
- Management School of IT. Technology School for IM.
- Type: Public Private Partnership (PPP)
- Established: 15 September 2005
- Executive Director: Prof. Shalini R. Urs
- Location: Mysore, Karnataka, India
- Campus: Manasagangotri, Mysore
- Website: www.isim.ac.in

The International School of Information Management (ISiM) is the first Indian i-School and is an autonomous constituent institute of the University of Mysore, located in Mysore in Karnataka, Southern India. ISiM was conceptualised and established in 2005, in collaboration with the leading information schools in the U.S. – namely the School of Information at the University of Michigan, the School of Information Sciences at the University of Pittsburgh, and the School of Information Studies at Syracuse University, International Institute of Information Technology (IIIT) Bangalore, and Dalhousie University of Canada. ISiM was established with grants from the Ford Foundation and Bangalore based Informatics India Pvt. Ltd.

== Introduction ==
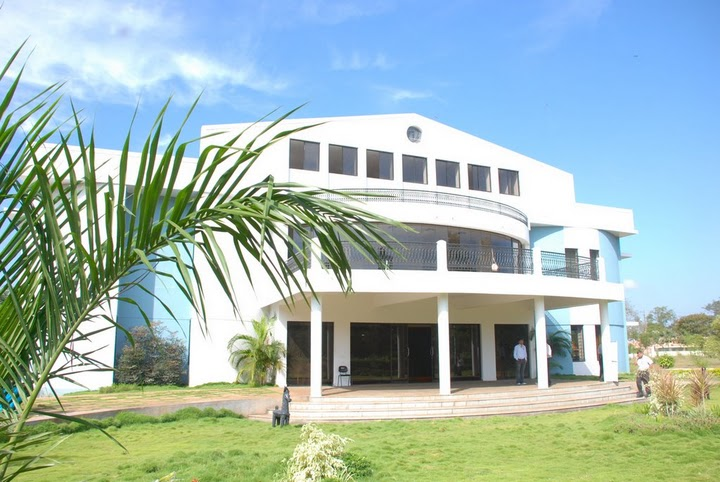
ISiM campus at Manasagangothri, University of Mysore

ISiM was conceptualized and established in 2005, by the University of Mysore, with seed grants from the Ford Foundation and Bangalore-based Informatics India Pvt. Ltd., and in partnership with some of the leading information schools in the U.S., namely the School of Information at the University of Michigan, the School of Information Sciences at the University of Pittsburgh, and the School of Information Studies at Syracuse University. ISiM was sown during a discussion in academia; dozens of sessions later, during the annual Knowledge Summit in September 2005, Dr. Som Mittal, the then director of HP and the current president of NASSCOM, officially launched ISiM. ISiM signed a memorandum of understanding with the School of Information Studies at Syracuse University, the University of Michigan and Dalhousie University of Canada in 2006.

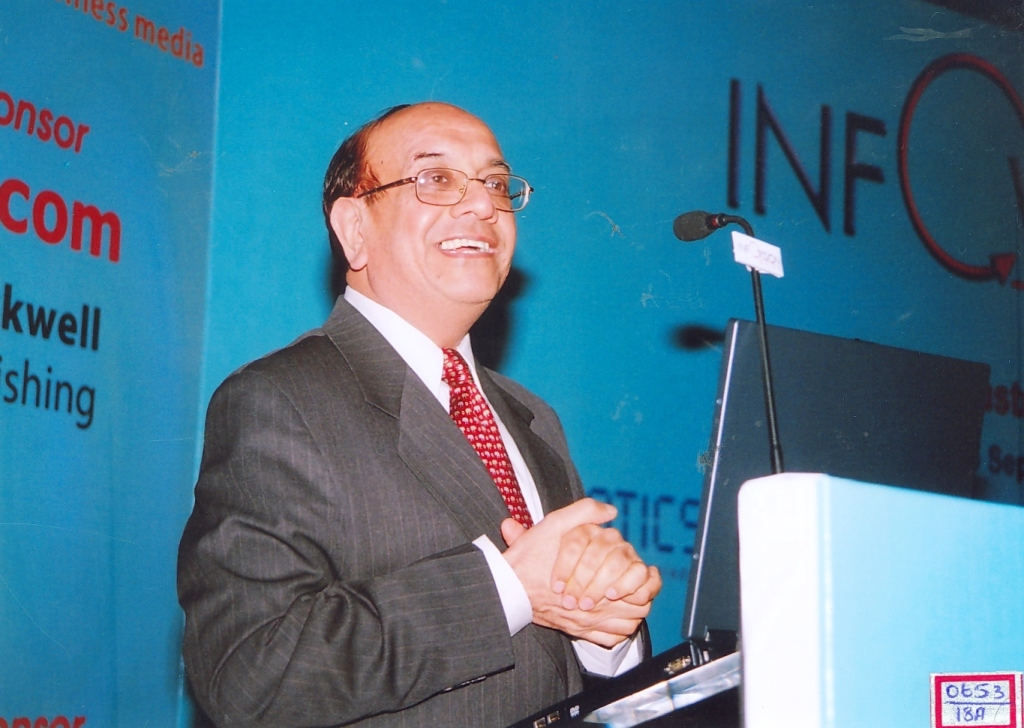
Dr. Som Mittal, the then director of HP and the current president of NASSCOM, launching ISiM at InfoVision 2005

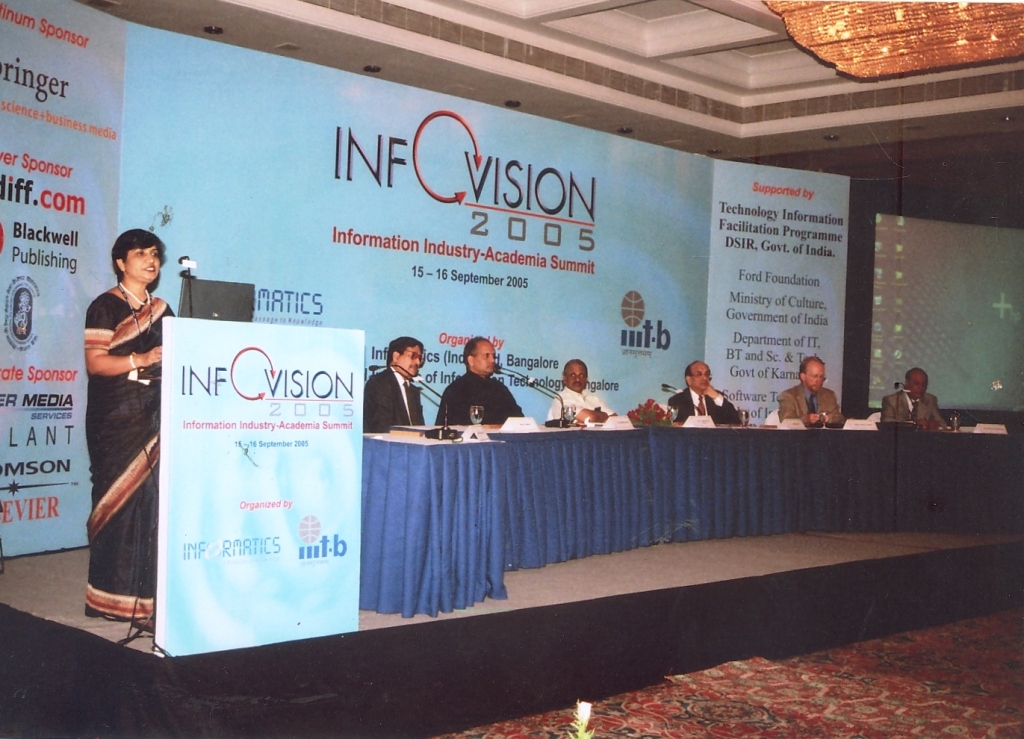
Dr. Shalini R. Urs, the executive director of ISiM, speaking at the launch of ISiM at InfoVision 2005

ISiM defines a new educational model – the inverse of distance learning – in which the students and the school are in Mysore, but the faculty and mentors are drawn from ISiM's partners and other institutions.

ISiM is directed by an independent governing board, chaired by the vice-chancellor of the University of Mysore, with eminent academics and industry stalwarts as members. ISiM has people like N. R. Narayana Murthy (chairman and mentor Infosys Technologies), Prof. M. Anandakrishnan (Chairman-IIT, Kanpur), Dr.N. Seshagiri (Former director general, National Informatics Centre, New Delhi), among others, on its governing board.

== Academics ==
The first batch of M.Tech. students began in August 2007. Currently, three batches of M.Tech. students have graduated from ISiM. The second year of the fourth batch will commence in September 2011. Being a multidisciplinary course. Foreign students have grown from 0% in the first batch of M.Tech. to 23% in the third batch. In its fourth batch (2012), 27% of the total students are foreign students. ISiM offers the following programmes:

1. M.Tech. in information systems & management
2. Post-graduate diploma in information management
3. Doctoral degree programme (Ph.D.) in information systems & management
4. Executive education programmes
5. Corporate training programmes

=== Faculty ===
ISiM has 37 adjunct faculty.

=== Research ===
Research areas of ISiM include:

1. Content Development & Management-Tools and Technologies
2. Business Intelligence & Information
3. Data Mining and Information Retrieval
4. Natural Language Processing and Indian Languages
5. Human Information Interactions and Usability
6. Knowledge Management, Information Use and Reuse
7. Cultural Informatics

=== Projects ===
ISiM has been involved in various community projects, which include:

- In March 2007, ISiM received ₹1 crore funding and collaboration from Rediff to research Indian language content (Indo-Aryan languages and Dravidian languages) management and optical character recognition.
- Education Development Center India Digital Library of Audio Visual Educational Materials
- Sasyasiri: Web enabled multimedia database of plants of Karnataka, Government of Karnataka

== Governing board ==
Member	Affiliation
Dr. V. G. Talawar (Chairperson)	Vice-chancellor, University of Mysore
Prof. M. Anandakrishnan	Chairman IIT Kanpur
Dr. N. Seshagiri	Former director General, National Informatics Centre
Mr. N. R. Narayana Murthy	Chairman & chief mentor, Infosys Technologies
Dr. Prakash G. Apte	Former director, Indian Institute of Management Bangalore
Dr. S. Sadagopan	Founder Director, International Institute of Information Technology, Bangalore
Dr. P. Anandan	Managing director, Microsoft Research Labs India Pvt. Ltd. Bangalore
Mr. N. V. Sathyanarayana	Chairman & managing director, Informatics India Limited Bangalore
Prof. P. S. Naik	Registrar, University of Mysore, Mysore
Mr. M. N VidyaShankar (IAS)	Principal Secretary, Department of e-Governance, Government of Karnataka
Dr. Prasad Ram	Director & centre head, Google India
Dr. Shalini R. Urs (Member Secretary)	Executive director, ISiM, University of Mysore

== Board of studies ==
Member	Affiliation
Dr. Shalini R. Urs (Chairperson)	Executive director, ISiM, University of Mysore
Dr. Chidananda Gowda	Former Vice Chancellor and Visiting Professor, ISiM, University of Mysore
Dr. D. S. Guru	Reader, Department of Studies in Computer Science, University of Mysore
Prof. T. N. Nagabhushan	Special Officer, E-Learning Centre, Visvesvaraya Technological University, SJCE Campus, Mysore
Dr. J. K. Suresh	Assistant Vice President, Infosys Technologies Ltd. Education and Research, Bangalore
Dr. N. Yathindra	Director, Institute of Bioinformatics and Applied Biotechnology, Bangalore
Prof. Krithi Ramathirtham	Dean, Department of Computer Studies and Engineering, Indian Institute of Technology (IIT) Bombay
Prof. Chandrashekar Ramanathan	International Institute of Information Technology (IIIT) Bangalore
Dr. A. G. Ramakrishnan	Professor and chairman, Dept of Electrical Engineering, Medical intelligence and language engineering lab, Indian Institute of Science Bangalore

== Campus ==
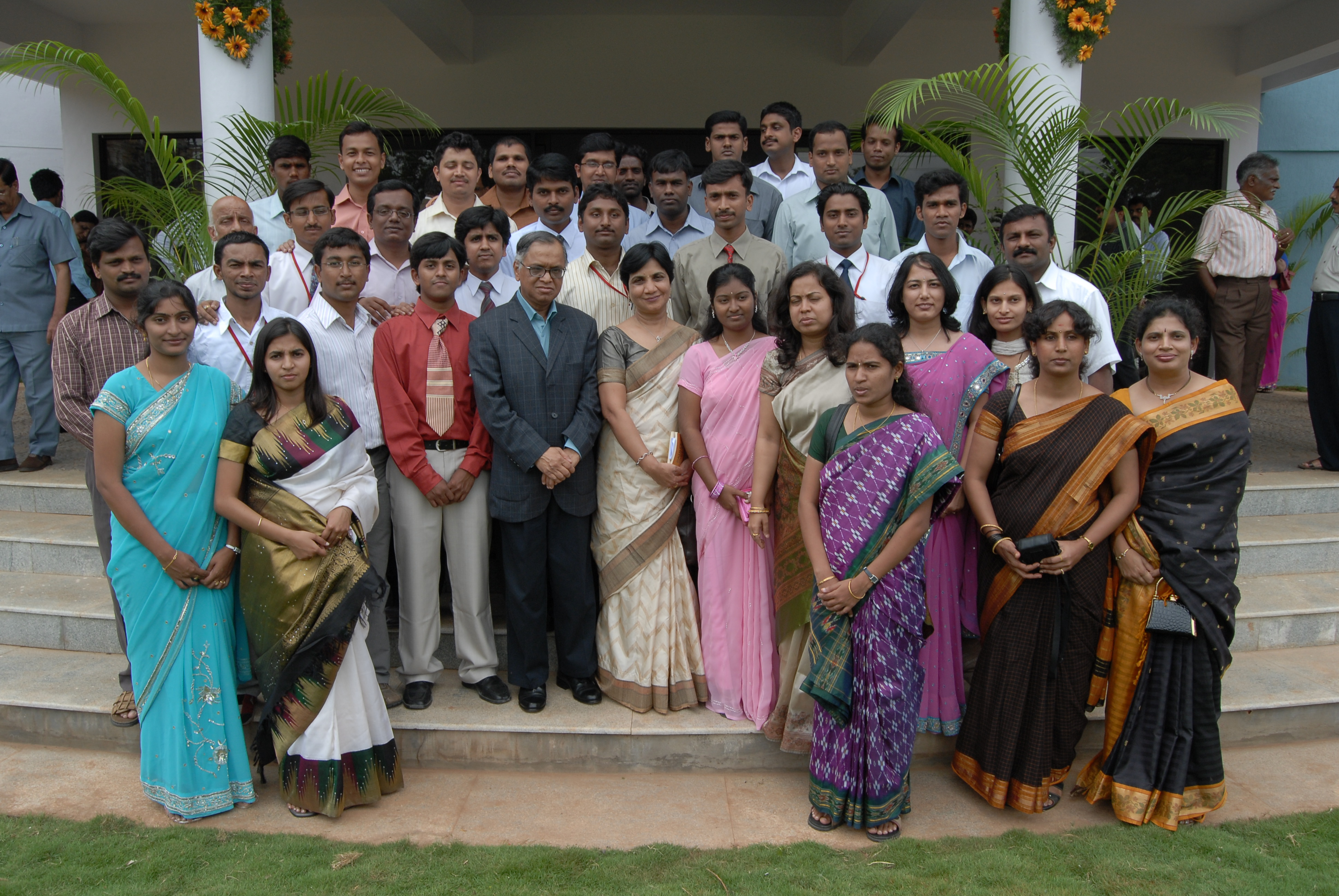
N. R. Narayana Murthy, chairman and chief mentor of Infosys, with staff and students of ISiM

ISiM's campus is located on the Manasagangothri campus of the University of Mysore at Mysore, India. ISiM started by using the classrooms of the Department of Library and Information Science in the University of Mysore. Its new campus was inaugurated on 20 August 2008 by Mr. N. R. Narayana Murthy, chairman and chief mentor of Infosys, who is also a member of ISiM's governing body.

== ISiM activities ==
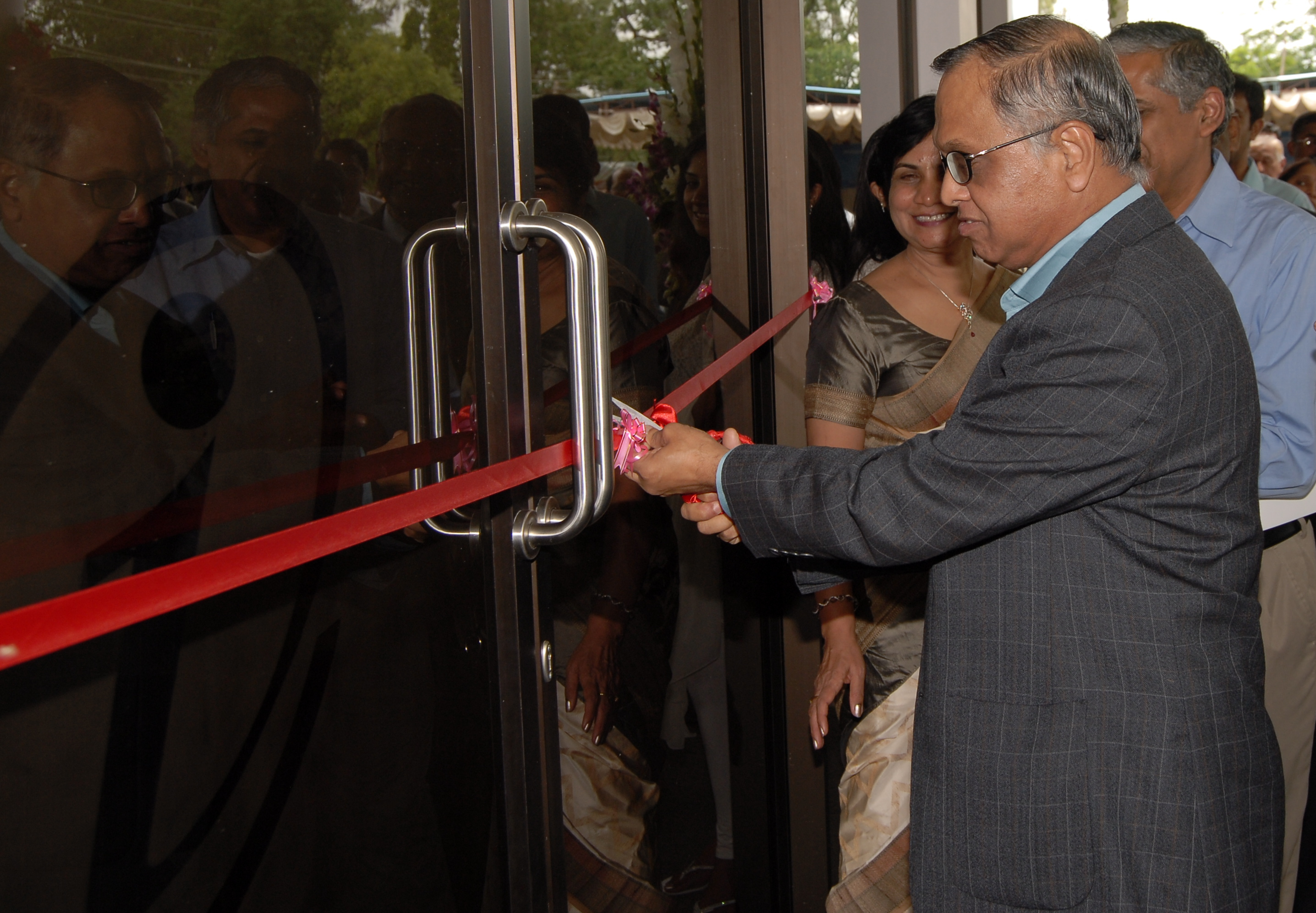
N. R. Narayana Murthy, chairman and chief mentor of Infosys, inaugurating ISiM building

=== InfoVision summit series ===
In an attempt to promote Academia – industry interaction for improvisation, ISiM organizes InfoVision, an annual conference series organized with this theme. InfoVision 2006 was organized with Confederation of Indian Industry (CII), Bangalore as joint organizers, InfoVision 2007 with Rediff and Internet And Mobile Association of India (IAMAI), InfoVision 2009 with Microsoft Research and Bangalore Chamber of Industries and Commerce (BCIC) and 2011 with TDWI Chapter India, CSI, DAMA International, IEEE Computer society, ACM and Compegence.

ISiM also organized InfoQuiz 2007, prior to the commencement of its M.Tech. programme.

=== Special lecture series ===
ISiM collaborates with other universities and organizations to organize special events, and one such venture is lecture series called "Special Lecture Series", with speakers from both the academia and the industry. Listed below are such lectures, their themes/topics and speakers:

- Special Lecture (1): "Wireless Security: Threats and Solutions", by Dr. Srinivas Sampalli, professor and 3M Teaching Fellow, Faculty of Computer Science, Dalhousie University, Halifax, Nova Scotia, and Prof. K. Chidananda Gowda, former vice chancellor, Kuvempu University. (2006)
- Special Lecture (2): "Web Content Mining for Automatic Integration of Web Search Source", by Dr. Vijay V. Raghavan Distinguished Professor of Computer Science. The Center for Advanced Computer Studies, University of Louisiana at Lafayette, Lafayette, LA, USA. (2007)
- Special Lecture (3): "More Search Vs. Search More – a computing perspective", by Prof. S. Sadagopan, International Institute of Information Technology, Bangalore. (October 2008)
- Special Lecture (4): "Decision Making and Information Systems" by Prof. H. Raghav Rao, Professor, University at Buffalo, State University of New York. (December 2008)
- Special Lecture (5): "Next Generation Information Access", by Dr. Mark T. Maybury, executive director, Mitre Corporation, USA. (January 2009)
- Special Lecture (6): “Making a better Web snippet”, by Dr. Ed Cutrell, researcher, Microsoft Research, Redmond, USA. (May 2009)
- Special Lecture (7): “Strategy and Innovation Management”, by Mr. Jatin H. Desai, CEO The DeSai Group, USA (June 2009)
- Special Lecture (8): “Data Mining and Risk Management”, by Dr. S. Chandrasekhar Officiating Director & Chair Professor, IT FORE School of Management, New Delhi. (June 2009)
- Special Lecture (9): “Changing Paradigms of Digital Marketing & Multichannel Commerce” by Mr. Ajay Malgoankar, group project manager, Infosys Technologies Ltd. (September 2009)
- Special Lecture (10): “Information Control and Terrorism: Tracking the Mumbai Terrorist Attack through Twitter”, by Prof. H. Raghav Rao, professor, University at Buffalo, State University of New York. (January 2010)
- Special Lecture (11): "Computing for Socio-Economic Development at Microsoft Research India" by Dr.Edward Cutrell, researcher – manager, Microsoft Research India, Bangalore (September 2010)
- Special lecture (12): "Leadership, Ethics & Persuasive Communication" by Dr. Matthew Frank Barney, Infosys Mysore (November 2010)
- Special lecture (13): "Talk on Copyrights", by Jared Margolis (BA, LLB, BCL), solicitor of the Supreme Court of Hong Kong (December 2010)
- Special Lecture (14): "The Open Video Project: Research and Practice", by Prof. Gary Marchionini, dean and Cary C. Boshamer, distinguished professor, School of Information and Library Science, University of North Carolina at Chapel Hill, USA (February 2011)
- Special Lecture (15) : Relevance of Information Management in Industry by Ms.Jagadamba Krovvidi, principal technology architect, Infosys Technologies Ltd.(May 2011)
- Special Lecture (16) : User Experience Design for Enterprise Software by Dr.Todd Barlow, director of Usability and User Interface Design, USA (June 2011)
- Special Lecture (17) : Individual Differences in Phishing Susceptibility: An Integrated Information Processing Model by Dr.Arun Vishwanath, director of Graduate Studies, associate professor, Department of Communication, Adjunct Associate Professor, Management Science & Systems, State University of New York at Buffalo, USA.(November 2011)
- Special Lecture (18) : Industrial Internet by Dr.Abhinanda Sarkar, principal scientist, Software & Analytics, GE John F Welch Technology Centre, Bangalore. (December 2011)
- Special Lecture (19) : Second level gatekeeping and Content Concentration in Twitter: An Analysis of the 2009 Gaza Conflict by Prof. H. Raghav Rao, SUNY Distinguished Service Professor, Management Science and Systems Department, University at Buffalo, State University of New York, USA. (January 2012)
- Special Lecture (20) : From Print to AR – Smart Media of the Future by Dr. Arved Carl Hübler, chair of the professorship, Institute for Print and Media Technology, Chemnitz University of Technology for German Government agency DFG. (March 2012)

=== CXO lecture series ===
ISiM also launched a CXO lecture series in October 2009, and the inaugural lecture was delivered by Mr. M. N. Vidyashankar, principal secretary, Department of E-Governance, Government of Karnataka. He delivered a talk on e-Governance in India: Challenges and Opportunities.

=== Workshops ===
ISiM organizes workshops and seminars on a regular basis to address various issues pertaining to the information age, which are open for students of the institute, as well as the general public. Details of such events organized in the past are provided below.

- ISiM Executive Training Programme (July/August 2006): Training workshop on Digital Libraries for NIFT Library Information Science Professionals.
- Information and Knowledge Audit – A Practical Introduction (January 2007): One day management workshop. Faculty: Ms. Waltraut Ritter (Hong Kong), Mr. Ritendra Banerjee (Hyderabad), Dr. Shalini R. Urs (ISiM, Mysore).
- Brainstorming workshop on OCR for Indian languages (March 2007): Also featured the setting up of Rediff Center for Indian Language Content Management (RCILCM).
- Workshop on "Text Mining and Business Intelligence" (March 2007)
- Cyber Security Workshop (October 2007): Focusing on teaching the basic principles of cyber security from the perspective of providing security awareness and its best practices for the real world. Faculty: Dr. Srinivas Sampalli (Dalhousie University, Canada).
- Workshop on Machine Learning (April 2008): Focusing on introducing the basic techniques of Machine Learning, its major areas of application and providing hands on experience to the participants. Faculty: Prof. Sargur N Srihari (SUNY Buffalo, New York).
- Workshop on Data Warehousing and Data Mining (October 2008): Faculty: Mr. Surya Patchala (Accenture, Hyderabad), Dr. P. Radha Krishna (Infosys, Hyderabad), Mr. Anoop Nambiar (Infosys, Bangalore).
- Workshop on Entrepreneurship and Management (October 2008): Focusing on answering queries on entrepreneurship and management. Faculty: Prof. Nandini Vaidyanathan (Management Consultant).
- Workshop on Capability and Maturity Model (CMM) (October 2008): Focusing on introducing the CMM standard and its assessment. Faculty: Mr. Srinivas Thummalapalli (Bangalore).
- Workshop on Spatial Data Infrastructure for Urban Governance Decision Making (March 2009): Organized by University of Amsterdam, International Institute for Geo-Information Science and Decision Making (ITC), The Netherlands, and School of Planning and Architecture, and hosted by ISiM.
- Workshop on IPR and Cyber Laws (June 2009): Focusing on providing students and professionals an understanding of Intellectual Property Rights and Cyber Laws. Faculty: Dr. Prabuddha Ganguli (Vision-IPR, Mumbai).
- Workshop on Business Process Management (August 2009): Organized by ISiM in association with UDream, Bangalore. Faculty: Mr. Raghu Santanam (Arizona State University, Tempe, Arizona, USA).
- Workshop on Social Network Analysis (April 2010): Focusing on introducing the concept of Social Network Analysis (SNA) and to provide hands on expertise on an open source tool for SNA. Faculty: Prof. Kevin Crowston (Syracuse University, USA).
- Pacific Asia Workshop on Intelligence and Security Informatics (PAISI 2010) (June 2010): Organized by ISiM as a part of Pacific Asia Conference on Knowledge Discovery and Data Mining (PAKDD 2010), in association with International Institute of Information Technology (IIIT), Hyderabad, India.
- Workshop on Intelligence and Security Informatics (June 2010): Focusing on introducing the domain of Intelligence and Security Informatics. Faculty: Dr. R. N. Prasad (Infosys, Mysore), Dr. Bhavani Thuraisingham (University of Texas, Dallas, USA), Dr. Michael Chau (University of Hong Kong).
- Workshop on Cloud Computing (Nov 2010): Focusing on virtualization. A team from VMware conducted a one-day workshop in which students of ISiM got hands on experience with VMware's product called vSphere.
- The Challenge – Think, Explore and Evolve [T2E](April 2011): One day workshop organized in association with IBM and CSI. An overview about cutting-edge technologies such as plug-in development, WEB 2.0, And DB Management was presented to the participants.
- Java Workshop (April 2011):Infosys – Education and Research Division, Mysore organized four days hands on workshop covering fundamentals of Java programming.
- Interactive Session on Information Excellence (June 2011) by Mr.Nagaraj Kulkarni, Founder, COMPEGENCE.The session introduced the "Process + Data + Domain approach" that is essential to achieve successful business outcome.
- Information Economics Workshop (March 2012): by Dr.Abhinanda Sarkar, principal scientist, software & analytics, GE John F Welch Technology Centre, Bangalore. Information Economics, the study of situations in which different economic agents have access to different information. Topics discussed: Asymmetric Information; Game theoretic Approaches; and Auctions.

=== Conferences ===
ISiM collaborates with universities to organize conferences. Such conferences organized in the past include:

- 15th International Conference on Management of Data (COMAD), organized with Computer Society of India (CSI) as the organizing partner and Infosys as the facilities partner. The event was sponsored by Google and Wipro as platinum sponsors and SAP as the bronze sponsor.
- International Conference on Digital Libraries (ICDL) 2010, at New Delhi, in collaboration with The Energy and Research Institute (TERI).

=== Programmes ===
ISiM offers the following programmes:

- M.Tech. in information systems & management
- Post Graduate Diploma in information management
- Doctoral Degree Programme (Ph.D.) in information systems & management
- Executive Education Programmes
- Corporate Training

== Student life ==
The M.Tech. class of 2011 has approximately 92% being graduates from various engineering disciplines, and the remaining 8% being graduates from other science and management disciplines. The class of 2011 has 23% of its class being from foreign countries. The class of 2012 has 27% of foreign students. The class of 2013 has 64% of foreign students,

=== ISiM Student Association (ISSA) ===
The ISiM Student Association was founded in 2007 with the first batch of ISiM. Members of ISSA executive committee include students from both first and second year of M.Tech., with the secretary being elected from the second year students.

== See also ==
- University of Mysore
- Mysore University Library
