= Shalini Urs =

Indian information scientist

Dr. Shalini R. Urs
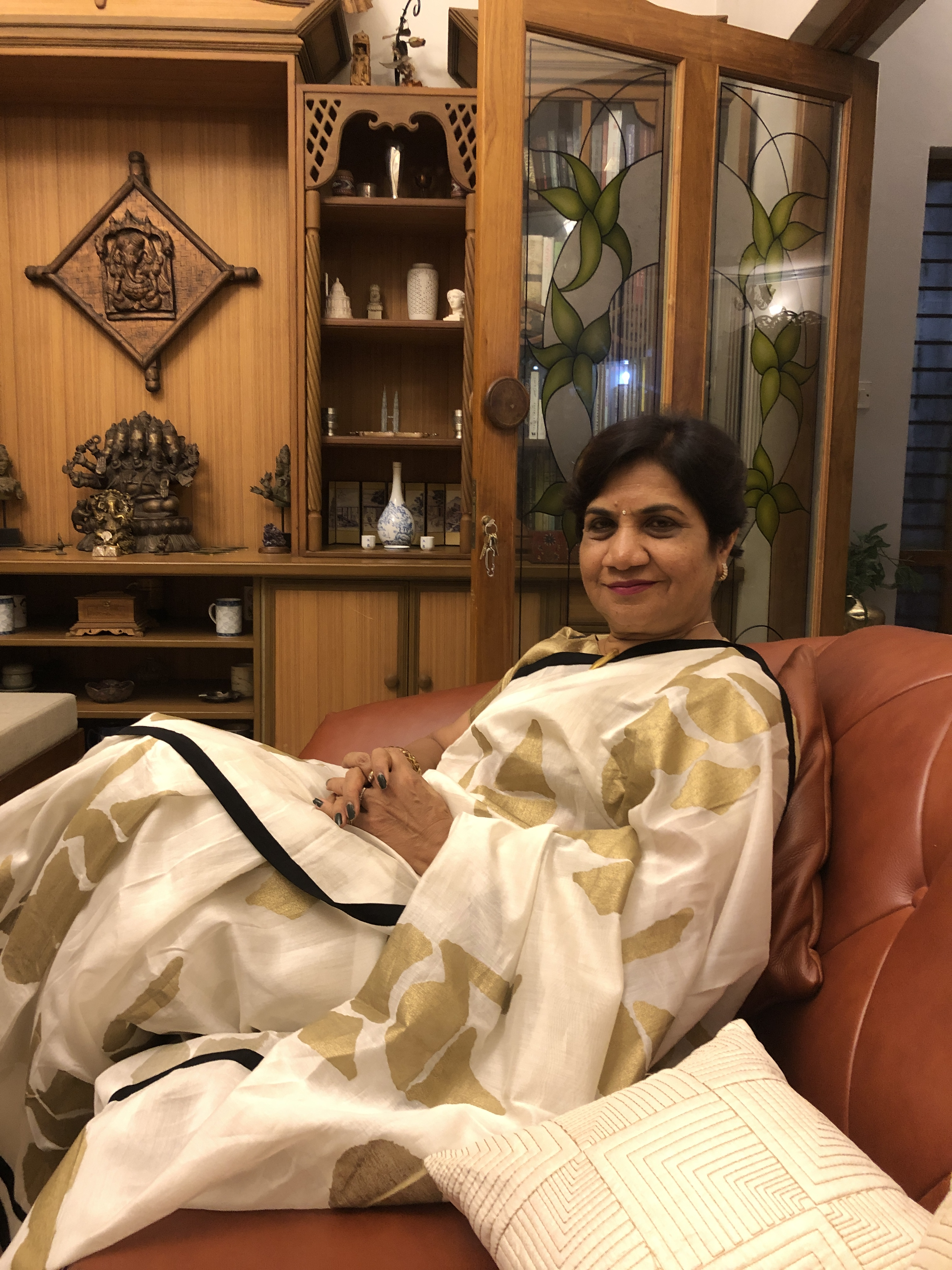
- Education: University of Mysore
- Known for: Vidyanidhi, ISIM, MYRA, InfoFire

Shalini R. Urs is an information scientist who pioneered the digital library movement in India, particularly the Electronic Thesis and Dissertations (ETD). She was awarded the Networked Digital Library of Theses and Dissertations–Adobe Leadership award in 2004 for her initiatives. She built a multilingual online digital library called Vidyanidhi in 2000, long before the digital era captured the imagination of many in India. She currently serves on the Board of Directors of Gooru and is an Associate Editor of Information Matters.

== Career ==
Dr. Urs started her career with University of Mysore in 1976 which she served till her retirement in 2016. She founded the first iSchool in India—the International School of Information Management, at the University of Mysore. She was a Fulbright scholar and a visiting professor at the Department of Computer Science, Virginia Tech, USA during 2000 -2001. She was a visiting professor at the Documentation Research and Training Centre, Indian Statistical Institute from 1998 -1999. She was an adjunct faculty at the International Institute of Information technology, Bangalore (IIIT-B) from 2005-2008. She was awarded the Mortenson Distinguished Lecturer 2010 by the University of Illinois Urbana Champaign, USA and was invited to deliver their annual lecture series.

== Research ==
Her research areas include Information Retrieval, Ontology Development, and Social Media and Network Analysis. As a leading digital library expert, she was commissioned to carry out studies and projects by UNESCO, Educational Development Council, Washington, DC, USA and others. Some of her well-known projects/studies are:

- UNESCO Guide to Electronic Theses and Dissertations (ETDs), 2002
- UNESCO Directory of Open Access Education and Training Opportunities, 2011
- UNESCO sponsored Training Program called UN4IM Training Library and Information Professionals in India.
- UNESCO Workshop on eBooks, ISiM. September 2004
- Digital Library of Learning Educational Development Council, Washington, DC, USA Project the Dot-EDU digital library of audiovisual learning materials for underprivileged school children developed under the project 'Technology Tools for Teaching and Training in India
- Unicode Implementation for Indian Scripts funded by Microsoft

She has published more than 200 papers in peer-reviewed journals and prestigious academic conferences and also edited five books published by Springer. Her Google Scholar profile has more than 650 citations. She received the Emerald Research Fund Award 2007/2008 for her research "Networks and Turning Points: An Exploration of the Dynamics of Academic Networks and Social Movements in India".

== Vidyanidhi ==
Vidyanidhi, the digital library project that was conceptualized and developed by Dr. Shalini Urs was funded by Government of India, Department of Scientific and Industrial Research under their National Information System for Science and Technology (NISSAT). After further funding from the Ford Foundation, Vidyanihi became a national initiative. Vidyanidhi project was featured as an innovative case in the book - Digital Libraries: Principles and Practice in a Global Environment. Vidyanidhi was an endeavor to establish a national repository and a collaborative consortium of participating universities and academic institutions for the creation, submission, archiving and accessing of Indian theses and dissertations.

== Conferences ==
Dr. Urs was instrumental in bringing the International Conference on Asian Digital Library, one of the biggest digital library conferences, to India and organized it in Bangalore in 2001. She brought the series again in 2013. She also initiated and has organized a well-known Academia-Industry Summit series called the InfoVision-Knowledge Summit in collaboration with industries such as Rediff.com, Microsoft Research, and industry bodies such as CII and BCIC since 2005 and has brought speakers from across the globe including star speakers such as Jimmy Wales (founder of Wikipedia) and Prabhakar Raghavan, Vice President of Engineering at Google and others.

== International School of Information Management (ISiM) ==
The International School of Information Management (ISiM) is the first Information School (iSchool) founded by Shalini Urs with seed funding from the Ford Foundation to explore the feasibility of establishing an interdisciplinary institute focused on training and educating students to develop knowledge and skill sets in the broad-based domain of the science, technology, and management of information at the intersection of 'information' 'technology' and 'society' in line with the motto of iSchools. ISiM was established in 2005 in partnership with the University of Pittsburgh, International Institute of Information Technology, Bangalore and Informatics India as an industry partner.

== MYRA ==
Shalini Urs founded the Mysore Royal Academy (MYRA) School of Business in 2012.

== InfoFire podcast series ==
As an Associate Editor of Information Matters, Shalini Urs conceptualized and initiated a video podcast series called InfoFire: Fireside chat series in January 2022. Each episode is a conversation with an expert on a topical theme. InfoFire brings visionaries and experts across different domains to share their perspectives on the chosen topic.

InfoFire episodes are also published as part of the eJournal Information Matters and distributed by Information Systems & eBusiness network, a division of Social Science Electronic Publishing (SSEP) and Social Science Research Network.
