= Manasagangotri =

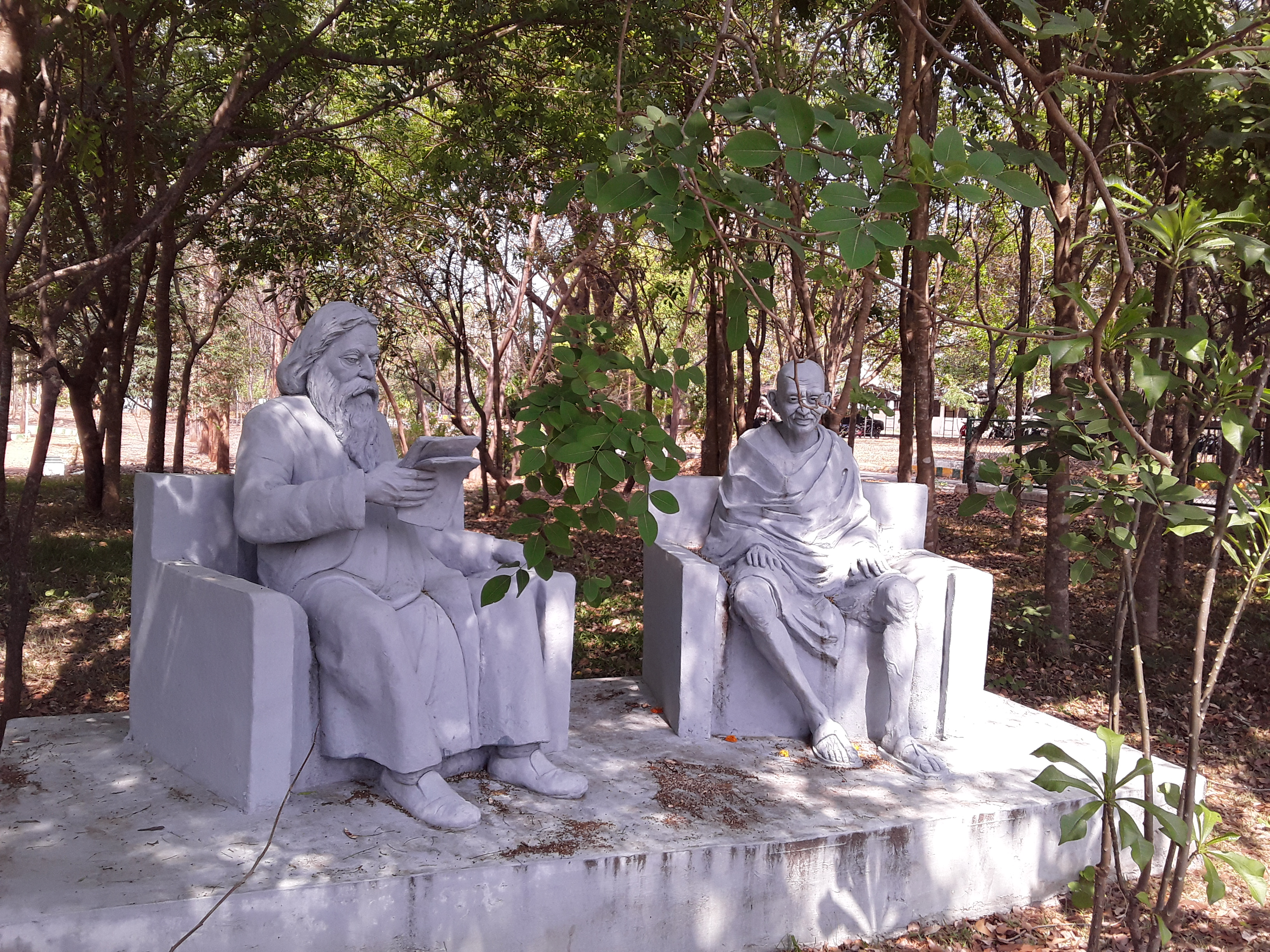
- Tagore and Gandhi
- Interactive map of Manasagangotri
- Coordinates: 12.30210°N 76.65007°E
- Country: India
- State: Karnataka
- District: Mysore
- Time zone: UTC+5:30 (IST)
- PIN: 570006
- Telephone code: 0821

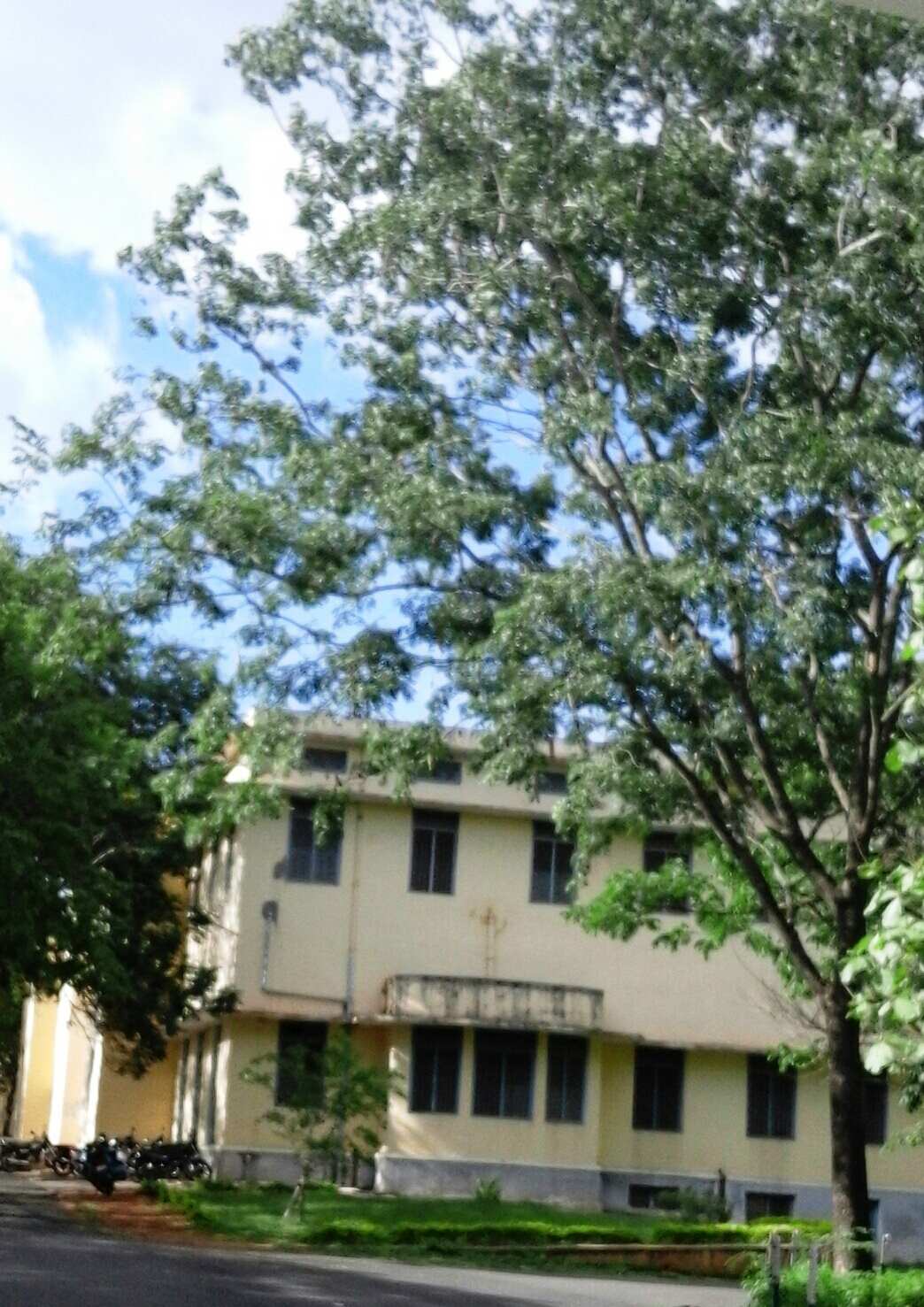
Maharaja's College

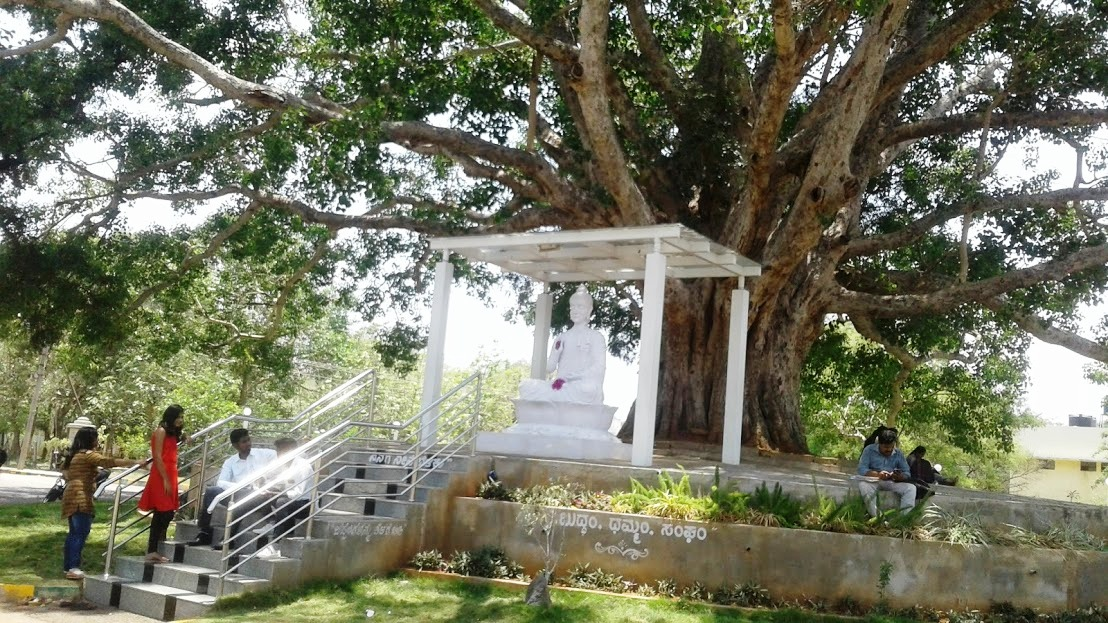
Buddha's statue near Genetics Department

Manasagangotri is a suburb of Mysore city in Mysore district of Karnataka state, India. Mysore University and its various departments are located in this area.

== Location ==
Manasagangotri is located on the western side of Mysore city. The Manasagangotri suburb is built around the Kukkarahalli lake in this area. This locality includes various educational and administrative campuses of the city.

== Post Office ==
There is a post office at Manasgangotri. The Pin Code is 570006.

== Important organizations ==
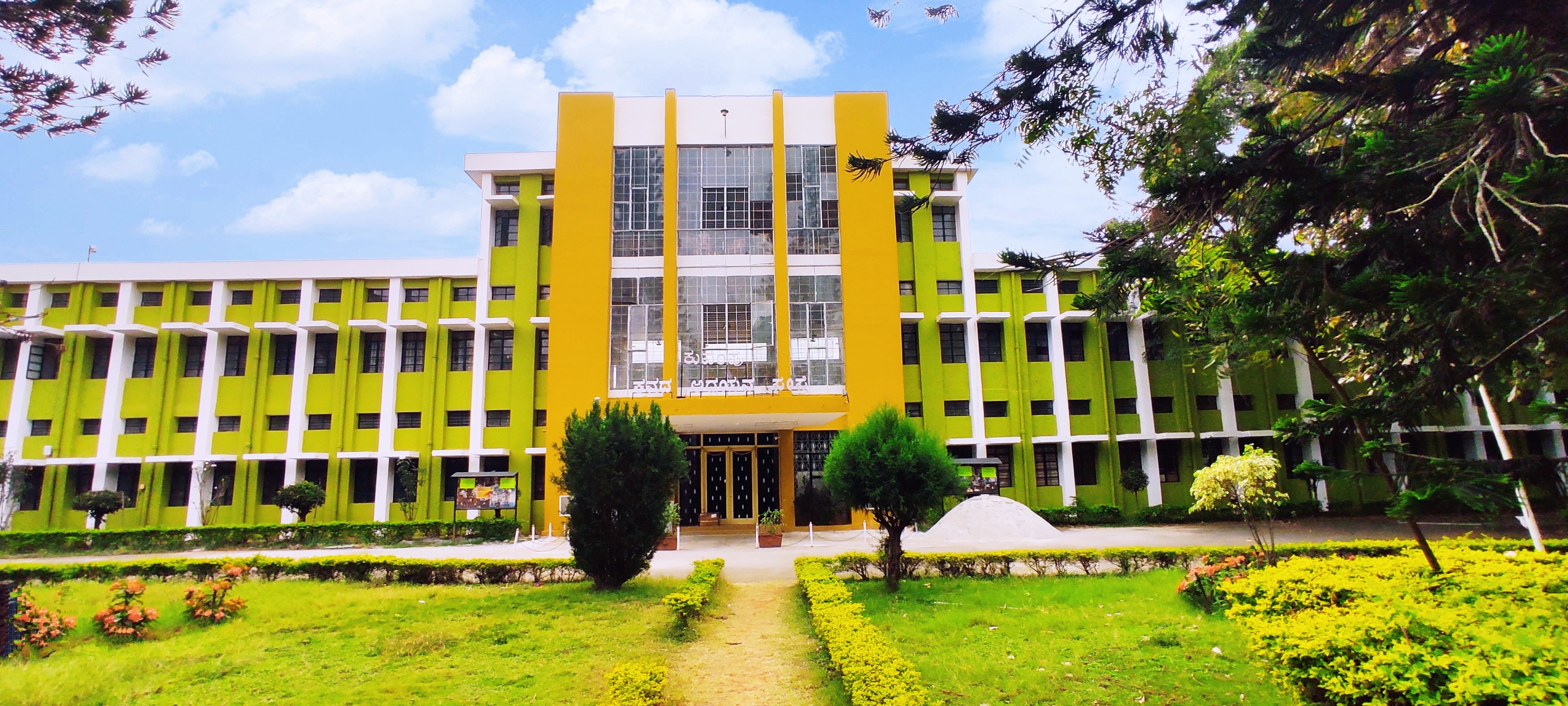
The Kuvempu Institute of Kannada Studies (KIKS), University of Mysore

- University of Mysore
- Oriental Library
- Deputy Commissioner Office
- District Court Complex
- Karnataka State Open University
- Maharajas College

== Tourist attractions ==
- Jayalakshmi Vilas Palace
- Kukkarahalli lake

== Kukkarahalli Lake ==
Kukkarahalli Lake also called Kukkarhalli Kere (Lake is ‘’keare’’ in Kannada language), located in the heart of the Mysore city, adjoins the Manasgangotri (University of Mysore), the Kalamandir (Rangyana) and the Central Food Technological Research Institute (CFTRI) campus (separated by the Hunsur Road). It provides lung-space to the city. Mummadi Krishnaraja Wodeyar, (1794–1868) of the Mysore Dynasty (Kingdom of Mysore) was responsible for getting the lake created, in the year 1864, to provide water for irrigation to about 4,000 hectares (9,900 acres) of land outside the city. The Lake also used to be a source of water supply to the city of Mysore but over the years, sewage and excessive land encroachments (mostly illegal) and blockage of water flow sources almost led to the eutrophication of the lake. The University of Mysore and the citizen forums of Mysore continue to make efforts to preserve the lake by implementing several remedial measures. There is a 4.5 km walkway on the periphery of the lake with shaded stone benches for visitors to sit, relax and enjoy the scenic serenity of the lake.

== School of Information Management ==
The International School of Information Management (ISiM) is the first Indian i-School and is an autonomous constituent institute of the University of Mysore, located in Mysore in Karnataka State, Southern India. ISiM was conceptualised and established in 2005, in collaboration with the leading information schools in the U.S. – namely the School of Information at the University of Michigan, the School of Information Sciences at the University of Pittsburgh, and the School of Information Studies at Syracuse University, International Institute of Information Technology (IIIT) Bangalore, and Dalhousie University of Canada. ISiM was established with munificent grants from the Ford Foundation and Bangalore based Informatics India Pvt. Ltd.

== University of Mysore ==
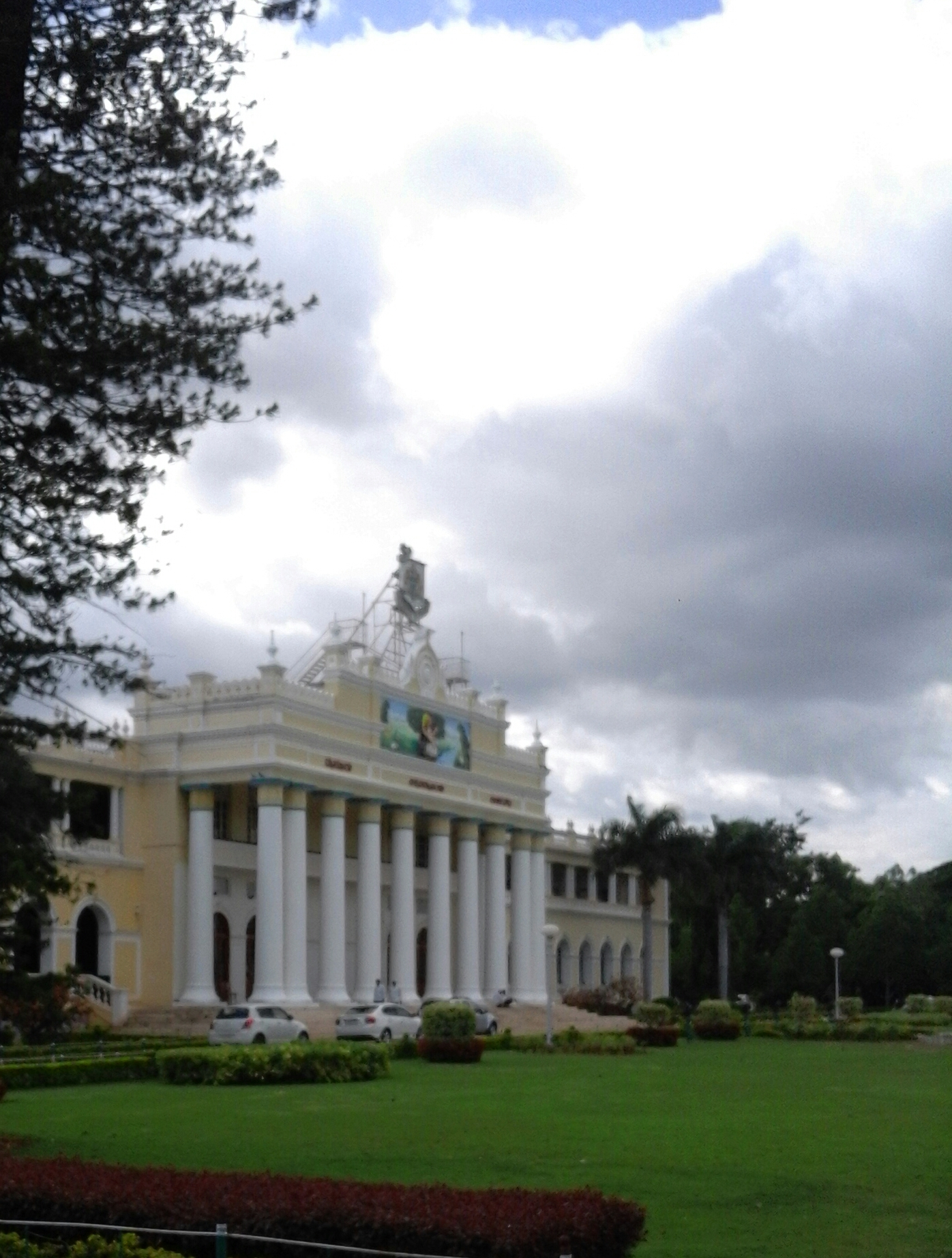
Crawford hall, University of Mysore

The University of Mysore is a public state university in Mysore, Karnataka, India. The university was founded during the reign of Krishnaraja Wodeyar IV, the Maharaja of Mysore. It opened on 27 July 1916. Its first chancellor was the Maharaja of Mysore; the first Vice-Chancellor was H. V. Nanjundaiah. The university became the first outside of the British administration in India, the sixth in India as a whole, and the first in Karnataka. It is a state university of the affiliating type, and became autonomous on 3 March 1956, when it gained recognition from the University Grants Commission.

== All India Institute of Speech and Hearing ==
The All India Institute of Speech and Hearing, commonly known as AIISH (AYE-SH), is located in Manasagangotri (Mysore University Campus), Mysore, India. It is an autonomous institute under the Ministry of Health and Family Welfare. The institute was established in 1966 with a focus on training professionals for speech and hearing sciences.
