= Sounds of New York City =

Noise monitoring research project

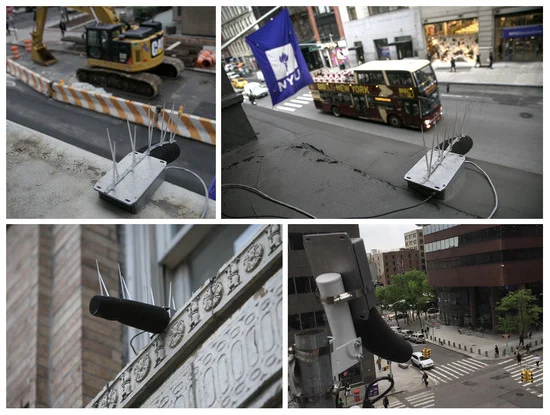
Acoustic sensor nodes deployed on New York City streets as part of the SONYC project.

Sounds of New York City (SONYC) is an urban noise monitoring research project led by researchers at New York University to study and mitigate noise pollution in New York City. The project combines a distributed acoustic sensor network, machine listening methods, data analytics, visualization tools and citizen science annotation of urban sound recordings. Its published work uses the term machine listening for machine-learning and audio-signal-processing systems that identify or classify sources in urban sound scenes.

SONYC was developed by researchers at NYU, including the Center for Urban Science and Progress, the Music and Audio Research Laboratory, NYU Tandon School of Engineering and NYU Steinhardt, with collaborators at Ohio State University. The project received a US$4.6 million National Science Foundation grant as a multi-year cyber-physical system initiative.

== Background ==
New York City receives more 311 complaints about noise than about any other civic issue, but complaint records are limited by spatial, temporal and demographic biases and by the delay between a complaint and an inspection. SONYC was designed to provide continuous, source-specific measurements that could supplement complaint-based enforcement and conventional sound-pressure-level measurements.

A 2019 Communications of the ACM article described SONYC as a cyber-physical systems approach to monitoring, analysis and mitigation of urban noise pollution. The system was presented as a loop connecting intelligent sensing, city-scale noise analysis and data-driven mitigation by city agencies or other actors able to reduce emissions.

== Development ==
=== Low-cost acoustic sensors and MKI ===
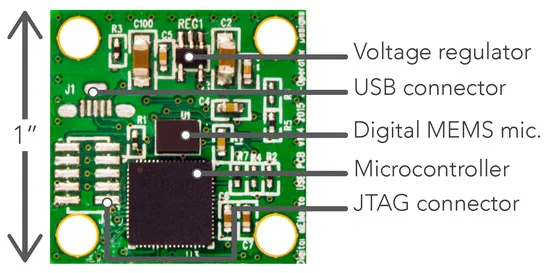
Digital MEMS microphone module used in a SONYC acoustic sensor node.

Early SONYC work focused on whether inexpensive hardware could produce calibrated environmental noise measurements. A 2017 Applied Acoustics paper described a smart, low-cost, static acoustic sensing device based on consumer hardware, with a focus on calibrating a MEMS microphone to generate reliable decibel readings at type/class 2 accuracy.

A 2022 ICCPS paper referred to the first deployed sensor platform as MKI or "Mach 1". The MKI network consisted of microphone-equipped Raspberry Pi 2B devices connected through Wi-Fi and managed by a private cloud infrastructure. Earlier project materials also used the spelling "MK1" for the MEMS microphone platform.

=== Sensor network ===
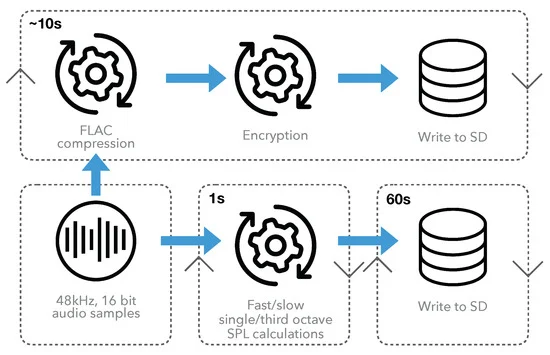
Operational data flow of the SONYC capture module, including audio processing and storage steps.

The first SONYC sensor was deployed in May 2016. By 2019, the sensor network consisted of 55 remote acoustic sensors across New York City and had collected more than 75 years of calibrated high-resolution sound-pressure-level measurements and 35 years of audio data. The system also collected telemetry used to monitor sensor health and to develop a prototype pre-failure detection model.

The 2019 sensor-network paper described the deployed nodes as low-cost acoustic sensors built largely from off-the-shelf hardware. Each node used a Raspberry Pi 2B single-board computer, an external network connection and a custom digital MEMS microphone module. The parts cost of the node core was reported as about US$80, excluding deployment, housing and other operational costs. The custom acoustic module had an effective dynamic range of 32–120 dBA and was calibrated against a precision sound-level meter to comply with IEC 61672-1 Type 2 accuracy for sound-pressure-level data.

SONYC sensors record sound-pressure-level data continuously and collect encrypted 10-second audio snippets at randomized intervals. The snippets are used to support supervised machine learning for automatic noise-source identification, while randomized sampling is intended to reduce the risk of reconstructing conversations.

=== Machine listening and datasets ===
SONYC publications generally describe the automatic analysis of sound recordings as machine listening. The project has also described the approach as supervised machine learning: humans annotate recordings with the sound sources they hear, and the resulting database is used to train computers to recognize similar sounds. In 2018 the project launched an audio annotation campaign on the Zooniverse citizen-science platform to teach machine-listening algorithms about urban sound.

The SONYC Urban Sound Tagging dataset, known as SONYC-UST, was released for the development and evaluation of machine-listening systems for urban noise monitoring. The 2019 DCASE Urban Sound Tagging task used 10-second recordings from the SONYC acoustic sensor network and asked systems to detect the presence of 23 noise-source tags in each recording. SONYC-UST v1.0 contained 2,794 recordings, while SONYC-UST v2.3, also known as SONYC-UST with Spatiotemporal Context, contained about 18,500 recordings with metadata describing when and where the audio was recorded.

=== Data analysis and visualization ===
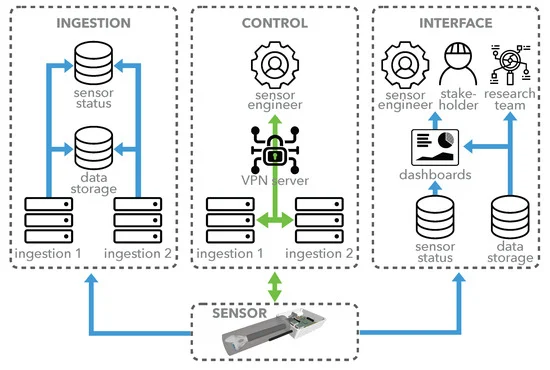
Infrastructure overview of the SONYC sensor network.

SONYC research also produced tools for analyzing large acoustic time series and audio collections. The Time Lattice data structure and Noise Profiler interface were developed for interactive visual analysis of sound-pressure-level data from SONYC sensors. A later visual analytics system, Urban Rhapsody, combined audio representations, machine learning and visual analytics for interactive exploration of large urban soundscape datasets.

=== MKII ===
A later phase of SONYC extended the original two-tier wireless sensor network into a three-tier in-situ noise-complaint monitoring network. A 2022 ICCPS paper described the added tier as a network of MKII or "Mach 2" low-power acoustic motes using long-range LoRa multi-hop networking and edge machine learning. The MKII paper described the system as an infrastructure-free extension to the existing SONYC data-collection network, intended for locations such as construction zones where power and network infrastructure may not be readily available.

MKII used a digital I2S MEMS microphone acoustic front end, a LoRa radio, solar energy harvesting, lithium-titanate cells, power-management and computing microcontrollers, and local machine-learning components including a convolutional-neural-network embedding model and a downstream noise-source classifier. The paper reported overall runtime power consumption of 107 mW in classification mode and described SONYC-L3 as a mote-scale machine-listening CNN for urban sound classification.

=== SONYC Home ===
In 2020 SONYC received a US$400,000 NSF Transfer to Practice supplement to translate lessons from the street-level sensor network into a domestic noise sensor for residents experiencing recurring noise problems. The team announced partnerships with the product development agency Loft LLC and the New York City Department of Environmental Protection to design sensors suitable for domestic deployment.

The resulting work, referred to as SONYC Home in project repositories, used acoustic sensors deployed outside participants' apartments to collect sound-level data and support machine-learning classifications. The project repository describes a system combining sensors, central servers, visualization and reporting tools, and user engagement for monitoring domestic urban noise issues.

== Privacy ==
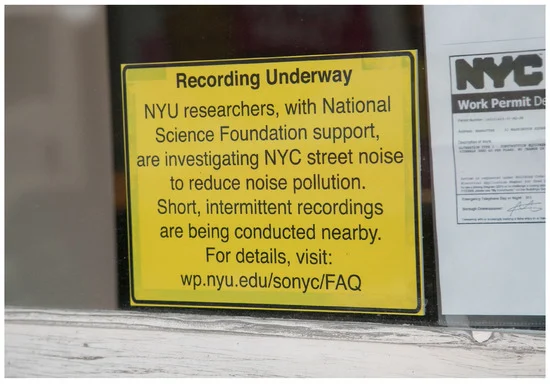
Public notice explaining nearby SONYC audio recording.

Because SONYC sensors use environmental audio, the project has addressed privacy concerns about incidental speech recording. The project FAQ states that SONYC is interested in identifying the presence of voice as a sound category rather than the content or identity of speakers, that raw audio access is restricted, and that a mature operational sensor network would transmit statistical descriptions rather than reconstructable audio. The same FAQ says that sample recordings were reviewed by independent acoustical consultants for conversational recognizability and that NYU's Institutional Review Board reviewed the research.

== Funding ==
SONYC began with seed support from NYU's Center for Urban Science and Progress and later received a US$4.6 million National Science Foundation grant under NSF award CNS-1544753. The project FAQ states that SONYC had not received funding from the City of New York or its agencies. A 2019 paper on the SONYC sensor network also credited NSF award CNS-1544753 and initial CUSP seed funding, and acknowledged the New York City Department of Environmental Protection for input and support.

Additional support included the 2020 US$400,000 NSF Transfer to Practice supplement for the domestic noise-sensor work. In 2020, NYU Tandon's Center for K12 STEM Education announced a one-year US$25,000 grant from Con Edison to support a SONYC summer school program for middle-school students.

== Reception and coverage ==
SONYC has been covered by technology, urban-policy and public-radio outlets as an example of applying artificial intelligence and distributed sensing to environmental noise. Smart Cities Dive described the project in 2017 as an effort by researchers from NYU and Ohio State University to use sensors to understand New York City's soundscape. The Verge covered the project's Zooniverse annotation work in 2019, explaining how volunteer labels could help train algorithms to distinguish sources of noise.

In a 2019 article about noise pollution as a public-health issue, The New Yorker discussed SONYC alongside other technological approaches to measuring and reducing urban noise. WBUR reported on the project's attempt to use citizen and expert annotations to train computers to recognize sound sources relevant to the New York City noise code.

== See also ==
- Acoustic ecology
- Citizen science
- Environmental noise
- Machine listening
- Smart city
- Urban informatics
