= Messner =

Messner is a surname. It is an occupational name of Austro-Bavarian origin, in which dialect it means sacristan/sexton.

People with the name Messner include:

- Carrie Messner (born 1977), American long-distance runner
- Franz Josef Messner (1896–1945), Austrian resistance leader
- Fritz Messner (1912–1945), German field hockey player
- Gabriel Messner (born 1997), Italian snowboarder
- Günther Messner (1946–1970), Italian mountaineer
- Heinrich Messner (1939–2023), Austrian alpine skier and Olympic medalist
- Johannes Messner (1891–1984), Austrian economist
- Johnny Messner (1909–1986), American big/swing bandleader
- Johnny Messner (born 1970), American actor
- Joseph Messner (1893–1969), Austrian composer
- Karl Messner (born 1970), American musician
- Mark Messner (born 1965), American football player
- Marland Messner (1934–1993), American actor and writer of soap operas
- Michael Messner (born 1952), American sociologist
- Mirko Messner (born 1948), Austrian Slavist
- Pat Messner (born 1954), Canadian water skier
- Reinhold Messner (born 1944), Italian mountaineer
- Roe Messner (1935–2025), American building contractor
- Tammy Faye Bakker (1942–2007), American evangelist
- Tony Messner (born 1939), Australian politician
- Willi Messner (born 1940), German swimmer
- William Messner-Loebs (born 1949), American comic book writer
- Wolfgang Messner (born 1971), German Professor of International Management
- Zbigniew Messner (1929–2014), Polish economist and politician

== See also ==
- 6077 Messner, asteroid named after Reinhold Messner
- Messner (film), a 2012 documentary film about Reinhold Messner
- Messner Mountain Museum, Reinhold Messner museum project at 5 locations in South Tyrol
- The Unauthorized Biography of Reinhold Messner, music record NOT referring to the mountaineer
- Meissner
- Messmer (disambiguation)
