= Drupal-club (Minsk) =

Open-source community in Belarus

Drupal-club logo

Drupal-club (Minsk) is an open-source community in Belarus which promotes free software principles in society. During the 2010-2013 years, this club was an organizer of various social activities such as the Drupal Rally, the Global Learning Drupal Days, and regular sessions. Drupal-club takes part in the implementation of some non-commercial projects and has formed a cooperative via the Drupal Association.
