= Kanaja =

Kanaja ಕಣಜ
- Website type: Online encyclopedia
- Available in: Kannada
- Owner: Government of Karnataka
- Website: kanaja.karnataka.gov.in
- Commercial: No
- Launched: 5 December 2009
- Current status: Active
- Content license: Yes

Kanaja is an online encyclopedia developed by the Karnataka Knowledge Commission and owned by the Government of Karnataka. The portal offers readers participation in updating the information, serves as a source of information in the Kannada language.

== Overview ==
Kanaja was launched on 5 December 2009 and was managed by the International Institute of Information and Technology-Bangalore (IIIT-B). In 2015 responsibility for organising the project was given to the Department of Kannada and Culture.

== Sections ==
- Art
- Literature
- Science,
- Environment
- Media
- History
- Technology
- Business.

== Article creation ==
- In existing article adding additional information, errors identification and corrections from reader displayed after committee review
- New article accepted and reviewed by committee and displayed.
