= A. G. Ramakrishnan =

Indian electrical engineering professor (born 1958)

Angarai Ganesan Ramakrishnan
- ஆ க ராமகிருஷ்ணன்
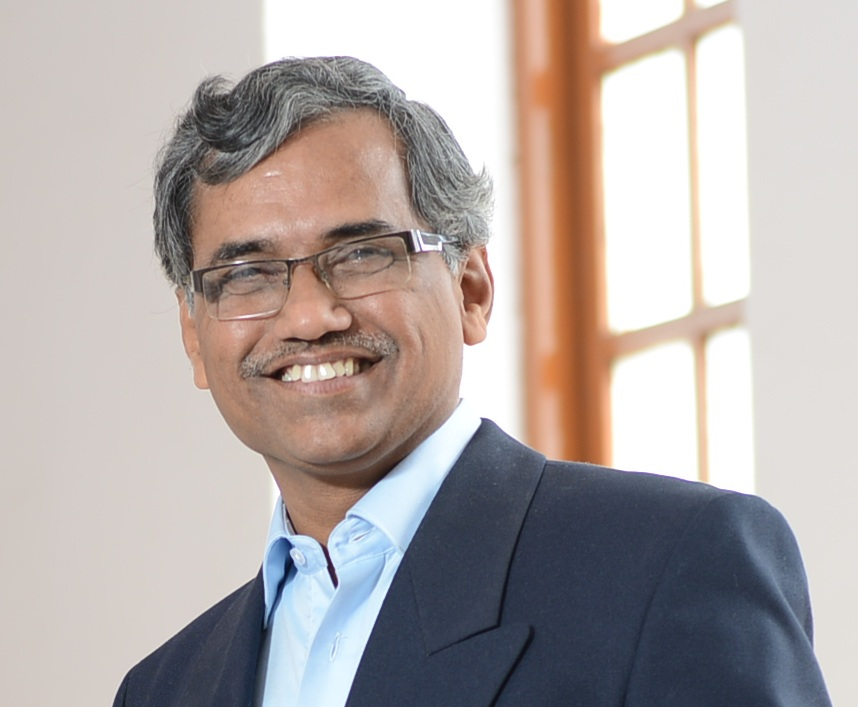
- Ramakrishnan in 2012
- Born: Ramakrishnan; 14 February 1958 (age 68); Bangalore, India
- Other name: Ram
- Education: PSG College of Technology; IIT Madras
- Scientific career
- Fields: Signal processing, machine learning, language technology
- Workplaces: Indian Institute of Science
- Doctoral advisor: T M Srinivasan
- Website: mile.ee.iisc.ac.in/AGR/index.htm

Angarai Ganesan Ramakrishnan currently holds an adjunct faculty position in the Department of Heritage Science and Technology at the Indian Institute of Technology, Hyderabad. He is also a Visiting faculty and Member, Board of Studies of the School of Psychology & Education, Rishihood University. He is also the Organizational Development Consultant for the Centre for Brain Research - IISc and IIIT Dharwad. In July 2023, he retired as a senior professor of Dept of Electrical Engineering and an associate faculty of Centre for Neuroscience, both at Indian Institute of Science, Bangalore, India. Before retirement, he headed the Medical intelligence and language engineering lab.

He received the Manthan Award 2015 for his project, “Madhura - the gift of voice”, under the category, e-education, learning, and employment. He is also one of the founder directors of RaGaVeRa Indic Technologies Pvt. Ltd., recognized by the Karnataka Government as one of the Elevate 2019 Startup winners. He is the Head, Business Development of Bhashini AI Solutions Pvt. Ltd, also recognized by the Karnataka Government as one of the Elevate 2019 Startup winners. From January 2017 to June 2020, he was a Member of the Karnataka Knowledge Commission (ಕರ್ನಾಟಕ ಜ್ಞಾನ ಆಯೋಗ). He is a Fellow of the Indian National Academy of Engineering (INAE) since November 2019. Since August 2022, he has been the Advisor - Neuroscience to Feedfront Technologies Pvt. Ltd., a startup based in Bangalore.

He is passionate about promoting pranayama exercises by giving talks on the scientific basis of the benefits of deep breathing practices. He is a Pancha Prana Kriya therapist certified by Sadgamaya Foundation.

== Biography ==
Ramakrishnan is a graduate of PSG College of Technology. He obtained his M. Tech. (Electrical Engineering) and Ph. D. (Biomedical Engineering) from the Indian Institute of Technology Madras. He was a postdoctoral fellow at the Fetzer Institute, Kalamazoo, MI, USA from 1990 to 1991. He is a Fellow of Institution of Engineers (India) and Institution of Electronics and Telecommunication Engineers and a Senior Member of Institute of Electrical and Electronics Engineers, United States. His research areas were speech recognition, speech synthesis, optical character recognition, handwriting recognition, and neural signal processing. He led a national research consortium on online handwriting recognition in Indian languages, funded by the Ministry of Information Technology, Government of India from 2007 to 2016, which had partners from IIT Madras, IIT Guwahati, ISI Kolkata, IIIT Hyderabad, C-DAC Pune and Thapar University. He has graduated 22 Ph.D. scholars, 16 Masters by research students, and guided over 100 M Tech projects. He was interviewed by Bhasha India for his contributions to Indic computing. He completed the Curriculum for Living and the Communication courses offered by Landmark Education from 1999 to 2001 and volunteered as a seminar leader for Landmark Education from 2002 to 2008.

== Professional activities ==
- Member, Institute Body, Sree Chitra Tirunal Institute for Medical Sciences and Technology, Thiruvananthapuram since Sept. 2024
- Associate Editor of Frontiers in Neuroscience and Frontiers in Neurology for the section on Brain Imaging Method, since 2021.
- Invited member of the Senate, International Institute of Information Technology-Allahabad, Prayagraj, July 2019-2023
- Member, Karnataka Knowledge Commission [Karnataka Jnana Aayoga, 2017 - 2020]
- Associate editor, Sadhana, January 2017 - 2019.
- Editorial board, Current Science, January 2015 to December 2016.
- General chair, Ninth Indian Conference on Computer Vision, Graphics and Image Processing (ICVGIP 2014)
- General chair, International Conference on Biomedical Engineering (ICBME 2011), Manipal, India, 10–12 December 2011.
- Board of Studies, International School of Information Management (ISiM), University of Mysore.

== Honours ==
- B V Baliga Memorial Award by The IETE, Sep 2024
- Alumni Association Award for Excellence in Research by IISc Council, 2023
- Fellow of the Indian National Academy of Engineering
- Jaya-Jayant Award for Teaching Excellence in Engineering by IISc Council, 2016
- Manthan Award (South Asia and Asia Pacific) - e-education category, 2015
- Manthan Award 2014 under the category e-inclusion and accessibility.
- Prof. M. Anandakrishnan Award by INFITT at 12th International Tamil Internet Conference, 2013, Univ. of Malaya.
- Sir Andrew Watt Kay Young Researcher's Prize from Royal College of Physicians & Surgeons, Glasgow, 1992

== See also ==
- Medical intelligence and language engineering lab
- Optical character recognition
- Handwriting recognition
- Speech synthesis
- Speech analysis
