= Wolfgang Messner =

Professor, consultant and author

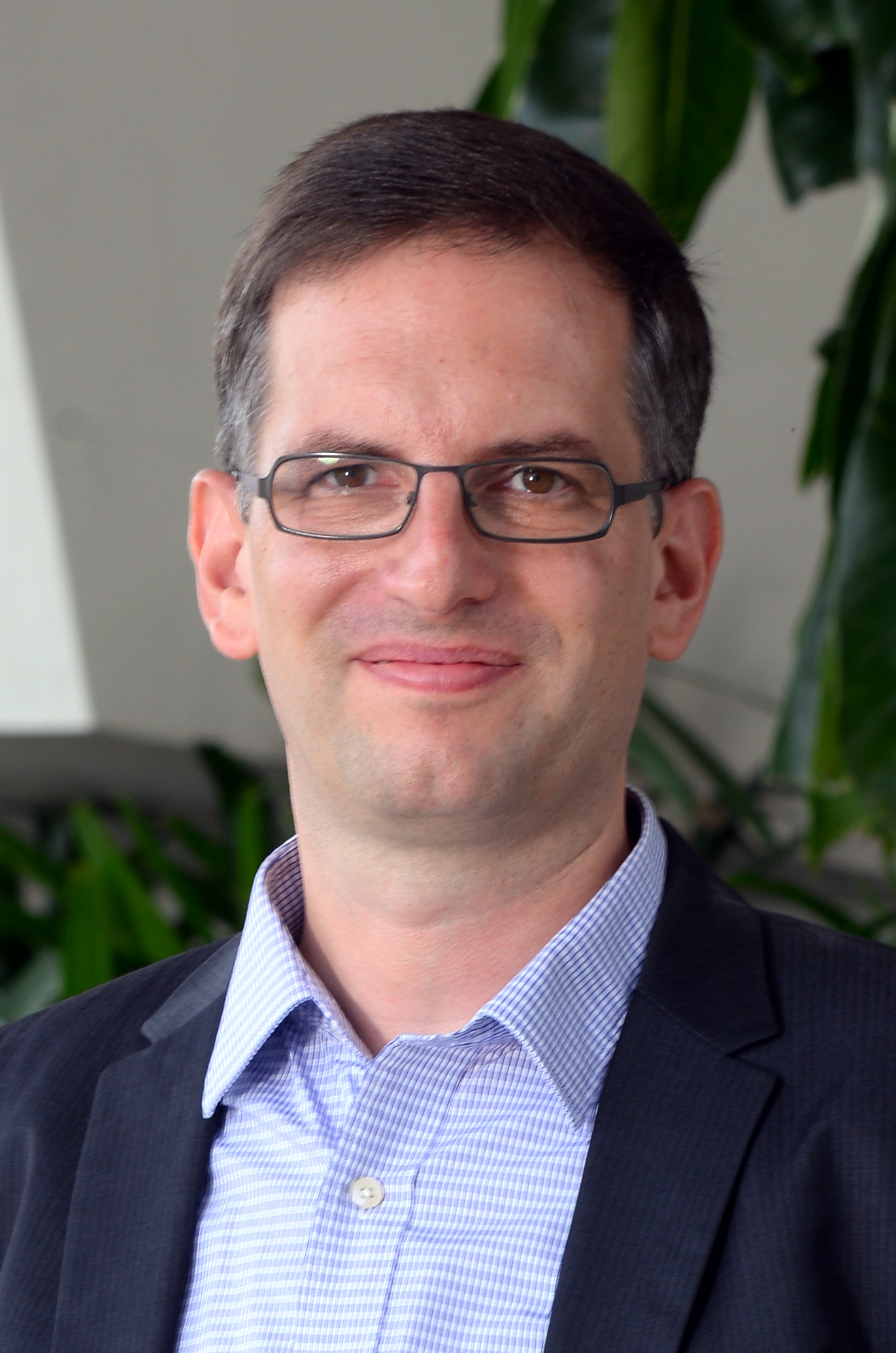
- Messner in 2014
- Born: 9 February 1971 (age 55); Penzberg (Germany)
- Education: Technical University of Munich; University of Wales; University of Kassel
- Occupations: Professor, consultant, author, speaker
- Spouse: Pratibha Messner
- Website: wolfgangmessner.com

Wolfgang Messner (born 9 February 1971) is Clinical Professor of International Business at the Darla Moore School of Business (University of South Carolina, Columbia, SC). Prior to coming to the University of South Carolina in August 2016, he was Professor of International Management at the MYRA School of Business in Mysore (India), and Director of GloBus Research.

He was educated at the Technical University of Munich (Germany) and University of Newcastle Upon Tyne (U.K.) where he studied Business informatics; he obtained his M.B.A. in Financial management from the University of Wales (U.K.) and his Doctorate in Marketing from the University of Kassel (Germany). He also studied at the Università per Stranieri Perugia (Italy) and Harvard Business School (U.S.).

Wolfgang Messner is the author and co-editor of several business books, including: The Palgrave Handbook of Managing Continuous Business Transformation (co-edited with Horst Ellermann and Peter Kreutter; Palgrave Macmillan, 2017), Winning the Right Job (co-authored with Pratibha Messner; Pan MacMillan, 2015), Making the Compelling Business Case (Palgrave Macmillan, 2013), Globalization of Professional Services (co-edited with Ulrich Bäumer and Peter Kreutter; Springer, 2012), Intelligent IT Offshoring to India (Springer, 2010), Working with India (Springer, 2009), and Rightshore! (co-edited with Anja Hendel and Frank Thun, Springer, 2008).

== Personal life ==
Wolfgang Messner was born in Penzberg – a small town in Upper Bavaria, Germany – on 9 February 1971. He is the son of Jürgen and Gertrud Meßner and has one younger brother, Bernd. He is married to Pratibha, a graduate from Bangalore University (India) and Ashridge Executive Education (U.K.). After marriage in 2002, they have been living in Frankfurt am Main (Germany, 2002–07), Bangalore (India, 2007–09), Munich (Germany, 2010), London (U.K., 2011–12), Mysore (India, since 2013–16), and Columbia, SC (USA, since 2016).

== Professional career ==
After graduating from the Technical University of Munich, Wolfgang Messner joined Deutsche Bank in Frankfurt (Germany); he redesigned core banking software modules around commitment fees and initiated the implementation of a global credit line management system. As Program Manager for EMU software development he piloted the inclusion of offshore resources into core banking software development. During a one-year expatriate assignment, he delivered the Euro conversion project with his team at the bank's captive unit in Bangalore (India). After returning from India, Wolfgang Messner joined the Information Management Group (IMG) in Frankfurt (Germany) and Zurich (Switzerland) as Managing Consultant for customer relationship management, business process reengineering, and outsourcing of backoffice processes. He headed various business change projects in global and medium-sized financial services institutions and investment banks in Central Europe with a focus on getting value out of their customer relationship management programs, processes, and supporting system. His next professional step took him to the BWM Group in Munich (Germany), where he was a Senior Management Consultant for customer relationship management. At Capgemini he engaged in multiple roles across Europe and India. While initially a Principal and responsible for board-level mandated consulting projects around customer service excellence and operations, he moved to India for 2.5 years on an expatriate assignment as Director to ramp up the offshore application development and maintenance service delivery for Central Europe. He founded GloBus Research in 2010 in London (U.K.) and in 2013 transferred the firm to Bangalore (India) together with his wife Pratibha.

== Academic associations ==
=== Current ===
- Darla Moore School of Business, University of South Carolina, Columbia, SC (USA): Clinical Associate Professor (since 2016)

=== Past ===
- MYRA School of Business, Mysore (India): Associate Professor of International Management (2013–16)
- WHU – Otto Beisheim School of Management, Vallendar (Germany): Adjunct Faculty (2012–17)
- Indian Institute of Management Kozhikode, Kochi (India): Adjunct Faculty (2014–16)
- Indian Institute of Management Indore, Indore (India): Adjunct Faculty (2015–16)
- Royal Docks Business School (University of East London), London (U.K.): Adjunct Lecturer (2012)
- Indian Institute of Management Bangalore (IIM-B), Bangalore (India): Visiting Professor of Marketing (2005–2006)

== Published books ==
- Ellermann, H., Kreutter, P., & Messner, W. (Eds., 2017). The Palgrave Handbook of Managing Continuous Business Transformation. Houndmills: Palgrave Macmillan.
- Messner, P., & Messner, W. (2015). Winning the Right Job: A Blueprint to Acing the Interview. New Delhi: Pan Macmillan.
- Messner, W. (2013). Making the Compelling Business Case. Decision-Making Techniques for Successful Business Growth. Houndmills: Palgrave Macmillan.
- Bäumer, U., Kreutter, P., & Messner, W. (Eds., 2012). Globalization of Professional Services. Innovative Strategies, Successful Processes, Inspired Talent Management, and First-Hand Experiences. Heidelberg: Springer.
- Messner, W. (2010). Intelligent IT Offshoring to India. Roadmaps for Emerging Business Landscapes. Houndmills: Palgrave Macmillan.
- Messner, W. (2009). Working with India. The Softer Aspects of a Successful Cooperation with the Indian IT & BPO Industry. Heidelberg: Springer.
- Hendel, A., Messner, W., & Thun, F. (Eds., 2009). Rightshore! Successfully Industrialize SAP Projects Offshore. Heidelberg: Springer.
- Messner, W. (2005). CRM bei Banken. Ein Vorgehensmodell zur Erarbeitung einer Strategie, Prozess- und Systemarchitektur. Norderstedt: BoD.
- Messner, W. (2000). Studie zum Customer Management und Multi-Channel Management im Retail Banking. Zurich: IMG & Univ. St. Gallen.
