= Messmer =

Messmer is a surname of German origin, a spelling variation of Messner (sacristan/sexton) in the Alemannic and Swabian dialects. Notable people with the surname include:

- Anna-Katharina Messmer (born 1983), German activist and sociologist
- Arwed Messmer (born 1964), German photographer and artist
- Henry Messmer (1839–1899), Swiss-American architect
- Ivan Messmer (1931–2015), Canadian politician
- John Messmer (1884–1971), American athlete
- Léon Messmer (1900–1987), French Roman Catholic bishop in Madagascar
- Magali Messmer (born 1971), Swiss triathlete
- Mark Messmer (born 1962), American politician
- Mindi Messmer, American politician
- Nikolaus Messmer (1954–2016), Russian Roman Catholic bishop, Apostolic administrator or Kyrgyzstan
- Otto Messmer (1892–1983), American animator
- Otto Messmer (Jesuit) (1961–2008), Russian Jesuit priest, head of Jesuits in the CIS
- Pearl Ray Messmer (1892–?), Australian orchidologist
- Pierre Messmer (1916–2007), French Prime Minister
- Sebastian Gebhard Messmer (1847–1930), Swiss-born Roman Catholic archbishop of Milwaukee
- Thomas Messmer (born 1979), German tennis player
- Wayne Messmer (born 1950), announcer for the Chicago Cubs
- Messmer (hypnotist), stage name of Éric Normandin (born 1971), French Canadian hypnotist

== Other ==
- Messmer High School (Milwaukee) (est. 1926), in the United States
- Messmer (company) (est. 1852), a German tea and nutrition company
- Kunsthalle Messmer (est. 2009), art gallery in Riegel am Kaiserstuhl, Baden-Württemberg, Germany
- Villa Messmer (built 1902–04), a historic villa in Alzenau, Bavaria, Germany

== See also ==
- Mesmer (disambiguation)
