= Meissner =

Meissner, Meißner or Meisner may refer to:

== Geography ==
Meissner is the name of the following geographic features:

- the Meißner (range), an important mountain range in Hesse, Germany
- Hoher Meißner, the highest peak of the Meißner range
- Meißner, Hesse, a community in the district Werra-Meißner-Kreis, in Hesse, Germany

== Surnames ==
Meissner is a German surname. Notable people with the surname and its variants include:

- Alexander Meissner (1883–1958), Austrian engineer and physicist
- Andy Meisner (born 1973), American politician
- August Gottlieb Meißner (1753–1807), German writer
- Beate Meißner (born 1982), German politician
- Boris Meissner (1915–2003), German lawyer and social scientist
- Bruno Meissner (1868–1947), German assyriologist
- Carl Meissner (1800–1874), Swiss botanist
- Christian Meissner (born 1969), German politician
  - Meisner's Banksia, Australian shrub
- Carl Meissner (1830–1900), German Latin scholar
- Constantin Meissner (1854-1942), Romanian teacher
- Elena Meissner (1867–1940), Romanian feminist
- Elinor Meissner Traeger (1906–1983), composer
- Ernst Meisner (born 1982), Dutch dancer and choreographer
- Friedrich Ludwig Meissner (1796–1860), German obstetrician
- Fred Meissner (1931–2007), American geologist and engineer
- Freda Meissner-Blau (1927–2015), Austrian politician and activist
- Georg Meissner (1829–1905), German anatomist and physiologist
  - Meissner's corpuscle, type of mechanoreceptor
  - Meissner's plexus, intestinal nerve plexus
- Greg Meisner (born 1959), American football player
- Günter Meisner (1926–1994), German actor
- Hans-Otto Meissner (1909–1992), German writer and novelist
- Heike Meißner (born 1970), German hurdler and runner
- Heinrich August Meissner (1862–1940), German railway engineer and Ottoman Pasha
- James Meissner (1896–1936), American World War I flying ace
- Janusz Meissner (1901–1978), Polish writer and aviator
- Joachim Meisner (1933–2017), Cardinal and archbishop of Cologne, Germany
- Jochen Meißner (born 1943), German rower
- Joern Meissner (born 1970), German academic and business consultant
- Johann Heinrich Meißner (1701–1770), German sculptor and wood carver
- Karl Meissner (1891–1959), German-American physicist
- Katrin Meissner (born 1973), German swimmer
- Kimmie Meissner (born 1989), American figure skater
- Krzysztof Antoni Meissner (born 1961), Polish theoretical physicist
- Mac Meissner (born 1999), American professional golfer
- Maurice Meisner (1931–2012), American historian of 20th century China
- Otto Meissner (1880–1953), head of the Office of the Reich President, Germany
- Paul Traugott Meissner (1778–1864), Austrian chemist
- Randy Meisner (1946–2023), founder of the band the Eagles and solo artist
  - Randy Meisner (1978 album), self-titled
  - Randy Meisner (1982 album), self-titled
- Renate Meissner (born 1950), German sprinter and triple Olympic champion
- Sanford Meisner (1905–1997), American actor and acting coach
  - Meisner technique, an acting technique
- Shelbi Nahwilet Meissner, Native American feminist philosopher
- Silvio Meißner (born 1973), German football player
- Stan Meissner (born 1956), Canadian songwriter/composer
- Stefan Meissner (born 1973), German football player
- Stuart Meissner (born 1962), American federal prosecutor and politician
- Verne Meisner (1938–2005), American polka musician
- Walther Meissner (1882–1974), German technical physicist
  - Meissner effect, decay of a magnetic field inside a superconductor
- Werner Meißner (1937–2025), German economist, president of the Goethe University Frankfurt (1994–2000)
- Wolf Meissner (born 1969), German wheelchair curler, 2018 Winter Paralympian

== See also ==
- Messner
