= Computer audition =

Study of understanding of audio by machine

Computer audition (CA) or machine listening is the general field of study of algorithms and systems for audio interpretation by machines. Since the notion of what it means for a machine to "hear" is very broad and somewhat vague, computer audition attempts to bring together several disciplines that originally dealt with specific problems or had a concrete application in mind. The engineer Paris Smaragdis, interviewed in Technology Review, talks about these systems — "software that uses sound to locate people moving through rooms, monitor machinery for impending breakdowns, or activate traffic cameras to record accidents."

Inspired by models of human audition, CA deals with questions of representation, transduction, grouping, use of musical knowledge and general sound semantics for the purpose of performing intelligent operations on audio and music signals by the computer. Technically this requires a combination of methods from the fields of signal processing, auditory modelling, music perception and cognition, pattern recognition, and machine learning, as well as more traditional methods of artificial intelligence for musical knowledge representation.

== Applications ==
Like computer vision versus image processing, computer audition versus audio engineering deals with understanding of audio rather than processing. It also differs from problems of speech understanding by machine since it deals with general audio signals, such as natural sounds and musical recordings.

Applications of computer audition are widely varying, and include search for sounds, genre recognition, acoustic monitoring, music transcription, score following, audio texture, music improvisation, emotion in audio and so on.

== Related disciplines ==
Computer Audition overlaps with the following disciplines:

- Music information retrieval: methods for search and analysis of similarity between music signals.
- Auditory scene analysis: understanding and description of audio sources and events.
- Computational musicology and mathematical music theory: use of algorithms that employ musical knowledge for analysis of music data.
- Computer music: use of computers in creative musical applications.
- Machine musicianship: audition driven interactive music systems.

== Areas of study ==
Since audio signals are interpreted by the human ear–brain system, that complex perceptual mechanism should be simulated somehow in software for "machine listening". In other words, to perform on par with humans, the computer should hear and understand audio content much as humans do. Analyzing audio accurately involves several fields: electrical engineering (spectrum analysis, filtering, and audio transforms); artificial intelligence (machine learning and sound classification); psychoacoustics (sound perception); cognitive sciences (neuroscience and artificial intelligence); acoustics (physics of sound production); and music (harmony, rhythm, and timbre). Furthermore, audio transformations such as pitch shifting, time stretching, and sound object filtering, should be perceptually and musically meaningful. For best results, these transformations require perceptual understanding of spectral models, high-level feature extraction, and sound analysis/synthesis. Finally, structuring and coding the content of an audio file (sound and metadata) could benefit from efficient compression schemes, which discard inaudible information in the sound. Computational models of music and sound perception and cognition can lead to a more meaningful representation, a more intuitive digital manipulation and generation of sound and music in musical human-machine interfaces.

The study of CA could be roughly divided into the following sub-problems:

1. Representation: signal and symbolic. This aspect deals with time-frequency representations, both in terms of notes and spectral models, including pattern playback and audio texture.
2. Feature extraction: sound descriptors, segmentation, onset, pitch and envelope detection, chroma, and auditory representations.
3. Musical knowledge structures: analysis of tonality, rhythm, and harmonies.
4. Sound similarity: methods for comparison between sounds, sound identification, novelty detection, segmentation, and clustering.
5. Sequence modeling: matching and alignment between signals and note sequences.
6. Source separation: methods of grouping of simultaneous sounds, such as multiple pitch detection and time-frequency clustering methods.
7. Auditory cognition: modeling of emotions, anticipation and familiarity, auditory surprise, and analysis of musical structure.
8. Multi-modal analysis: finding correspondences between textual, visual, and audio signals.

=== Representation issues ===
Computer audition deals with audio signals that can be represented in a variety of fashions, from direct encoding of digital audio in two or more channels to symbolically represented synthesis instructions. Audio signals are usually represented in terms of analogue or digital recordings. Digital recordings are samples of acoustic waveform or parameters of audio compression algorithms. One of the unique properties of musical signals is that they often combine different types of representations, such as graphical scores and sequences of performance actions that are encoded as MIDI files.

Since audio signals usually comprise multiple sound sources, then unlike speech signals that can be efficiently described in terms of specific models (such as source-filter model), it is hard to devise a parametric representation for general audio. Parametric audio representations usually use filter banks or sinusoidal models to capture multiple sound parameters, sometimes increasing the representation size in order to capture internal structure in the signal. Additional types of data that are relevant for computer audition are textual descriptions of audio contents, such as annotations, reviews, and visual information in the case of audio-visual recordings.

=== Features ===
Description of contents of general audio signals usually requires extraction of features that capture specific aspects of the audio signal. Generally speaking, one could divide the features into signal or mathematical descriptors such as energy, description of spectral shape etc., statistical characterization such as change or novelty detection, special representations that are better adapted to the nature of musical signals or the auditory system, such as logarithmic growth of sensitivity (bandwidth) in frequency or octave invariance (chroma).

Since parametric models in audio usually require very many parameters, the features are used to summarize properties of multiple parameters in a more compact or salient representation.

=== Musical knowledge ===
Finding specific musical structures is possible by using musical knowledge as well as supervised and unsupervised machine learning methods. Examples of this include detection of tonality according to distribution of frequencies that correspond to patterns of occurrence of notes in musical scales, distribution of note onset times for detection of beat structure, distribution of energies in different frequencies to detect musical chords and so on.

=== Sound similarity and sequence modeling ===
Comparison of sounds can be done by comparison of features with or without reference to time. In some cases an overall similarity can be assessed by close values of features between two sounds. In other cases when temporal structure is important, methods of dynamic time warping need to be applied to "correct" for different temporal scales of acoustic events. Finding repetitions and similar sub-sequences of sonic events is important for tasks such as texture synthesis and machine improvisation.

=== Source separation ===
Since one of the basic characteristics of general audio is that it comprises multiple simultaneously sounding sources, such as multiple musical instruments, people talking, machine noises or animal vocalization, the ability to identify and separate individual sources is very desirable. Unfortunately, there are no methods that can solve this problem in a robust fashion. Existing methods of source separation rely sometimes on correlation between different audio channels in multi-channel recordings. The ability to separate sources from stereo signals requires different techniques than those usually applied in communications where multiple sensors are available. Other source separation methods rely on training or clustering of features in mono recording, such as tracking harmonically related partials for multiple pitch detection. Some methods, before explicit recognition, rely on revealing structures in data without knowing the structures (like recognizing objects in abstract pictures without attributing them meaningful labels) by finding the least complex data representations, for instance describing audio scenes as generated by a few tone patterns and their trajectories (polyphonic voices) and acoustical contours drawn by a tone (chords).

=== Auditory cognition ===
Listening to music and general audio is commonly not a task directed activity. People enjoy music for various poorly understood reasons, which are commonly referred to the emotional effect of music due to creation of expectations and their realization or violation. Animals attend to signs of danger in sounds, which could be either specific or general notions of surprising and unexpected change. Generally, this creates a situation where computer audition can not rely solely on detection of specific features or sound properties and has to come up with general methods of adapting to changing auditory environment and monitoring its structure. This consists of analysis of larger repetition and self-similarity structures in audio to detect innovation, as well as ability to predict local feature dynamics.

=== Multi-modal analysis ===
Among the available data for describing music, there are textual representations, such as liner notes, reviews and criticisms that describe the audio contents in words. In other cases human reactions such as emotional judgements or psycho-physiological measurements might provide an insight into the contents and structure of audio. Computer Audition tries to find relation between these different representations in order to provide this additional understanding of the audio contents.

== See also ==
- 3D sound localization
- Audio signal processing
- List of emerging technologies
- Medical intelligence and language engineering lab
- Music and artificial intelligence
- Sound recognition
