= Jim Messemer =

American former soccer goalkeeper (born 1958)

Jim Messemer (born August 3, 1958, in Jersey City, New Jersey) is an American former soccer goalkeeper who played in both the North American Soccer League and Major Indoor Soccer League.

Messemer attended Texas Tech University where he played on the men's soccer team from 1977 to 1980. He was also on the Red Raider Baseball roster in 1977 and 1978. In 1980, the Detroit Express selected Messemer in the second round (29th overall) of the North American Soccer League draft. The Express moved the franchise to Washington DC and became the second iteration of the Washington Diplomats in 1981. The Diplomats folded at the end of the season in October 1981. Messemer then signed with the Denver Avalanche in the Major Indoor Soccer League for the 1982 season. The Avalanche folded at the end of the 1982 season. In 1984 Messemer signed a free agent contract with the New York Jets as a placekicker. He was released in 1985.

After his athletic career Messemer has had a series of Senior Level Management Positions with Boston Scientific Scimed, Inc, Bayer (former Conceptus) VitraMed and HopeLink. Messemer then entered into a partnership with Major League Baseball and was the founder of a nonprofit, San Francisco RBI. RBI is now part of the San Francisco Giants Community Fund.
