= Anna-Katharina Messmer =

German consultant, sociologist, speaker

- Education: LMU Munich
- Occupation: Sociologist

Anna-Katharina Meßmer (born 1983) is a German activist and sociologist. Her work focuses on digitization, politics, social media, hate in the net, biopolitics, feminism and social politics. She became known for her contribution to the #about action and the open letter to the Federal President Joachim Gauck.

== Life ==
In 2008–2009, she advised the SPD party executive and Gesine Schwan. In early 2013, she was a co-initiator of the #about Action, in which many people shared sexist experiences on Twitter. The hashtag was also honored as the first hashtag in 2013 with the Grimme Online Award. On March 3, 2013, Messmer published with six other women an open letter to German President Joachim Gauck, in which they criticized Gauck's reaction to #aufschrei. He was accused, among others, of "lack of sensitivity to women who have experienced sexism".

In 2017, she completed her doctorate at the Ludwig-Maximilians-Universität München.

Today, Messmer is head of the office of the Research Institute for Social Development (FGW), and Visiting Fellow in the Democracy Lab of The Progressive Center.

== Works ==
- Überschüssiges Gewebe. Intimchirurgie zwischen Ästhetisierung und Medikalisierung. 2017, ISBN 978-3-658-17053-0.
- "Same Same but Different", Wanderungen: Migrationen und Transformationen aus geschlechterwissenschaftlichen Perspektiven,. Verlag, 2014. ISBN 9783839422205
