= Mesmer (disambiguation) =

Mesmer may refer to:

== People ==
- Franz Anton Mesmer (1734–1815), German doctor who postulated Animal magnetism, and for whom Mesmerism is named
- Gustav Mesmer, inventor of experimental human-powered flying machines
- Sharon Mesmer, American writer born 1960 in Chicago, Illinois
- Mesmer family of California, early settlers and developers of Los Angeles

== Other ==
- Mesmer (film), a 1994 film about the above
- Mesmer, a 1997 novel by Tim Lebbon
- Mesmer (album), a 2017 album by the Australian band Northlane

== See also ==
- Messmer (disambiguation)
