= Kevin Crowston =

American information scientist

- Citizenship: United States
- Known for: Coordination Theory; Social computing
- Awards: AAAS Fellow
- Scientific career
- Institutions: Syracuse University
- Thesis: Towards a coordination cookbook--recipes for multi-agent action (1991)
- Doctoral advisor: Thomas W. Malone
- Website: crowston.syr.edu

Kevin Ghen Crowston is a Distinguished Professor of Information Science at the Syracuse University School of Information Studies (iSchool). Crowston's research focuses on design and empirical evaluation of coordination-intensive processes in human organizations.

== Background ==
Crowston attended the Harvard University, graduating in 1984 with an A.B. in Applied Mathematics (Computer Science). He earned a Ph.D. in information technologies from the Sloan School of Management, Massachusetts Institute of Technology in 1991.

He began working as a lecturer at MIT in 1991 and in the same year joined University of Michigan Business School, working there as an assistant professor until 1996. In 1996, Crowston joined the faculty at Syracuse University in the iSchool.

He is co-editor-in-chief of the journal Information, Technology and People and was formerly editor-in-chief of ACM Transactions on Social Computing.

== Awards ==
- 2026 Fellows of the American Association for the Advancement of Science
- 2025–2028 ACM Distinguished Speaker
- 2019 Research in Information Science Award, Association for Information Science and Technology

== Books ==
- Crowston, K. G. (2003). Organizing Business Knowledge: The MIT Process Handbook. MIT Press. doi:10.1111/j.0737-6782.2005.116_4.x
