= MYRA School of Business =

Business school in Mysore, India

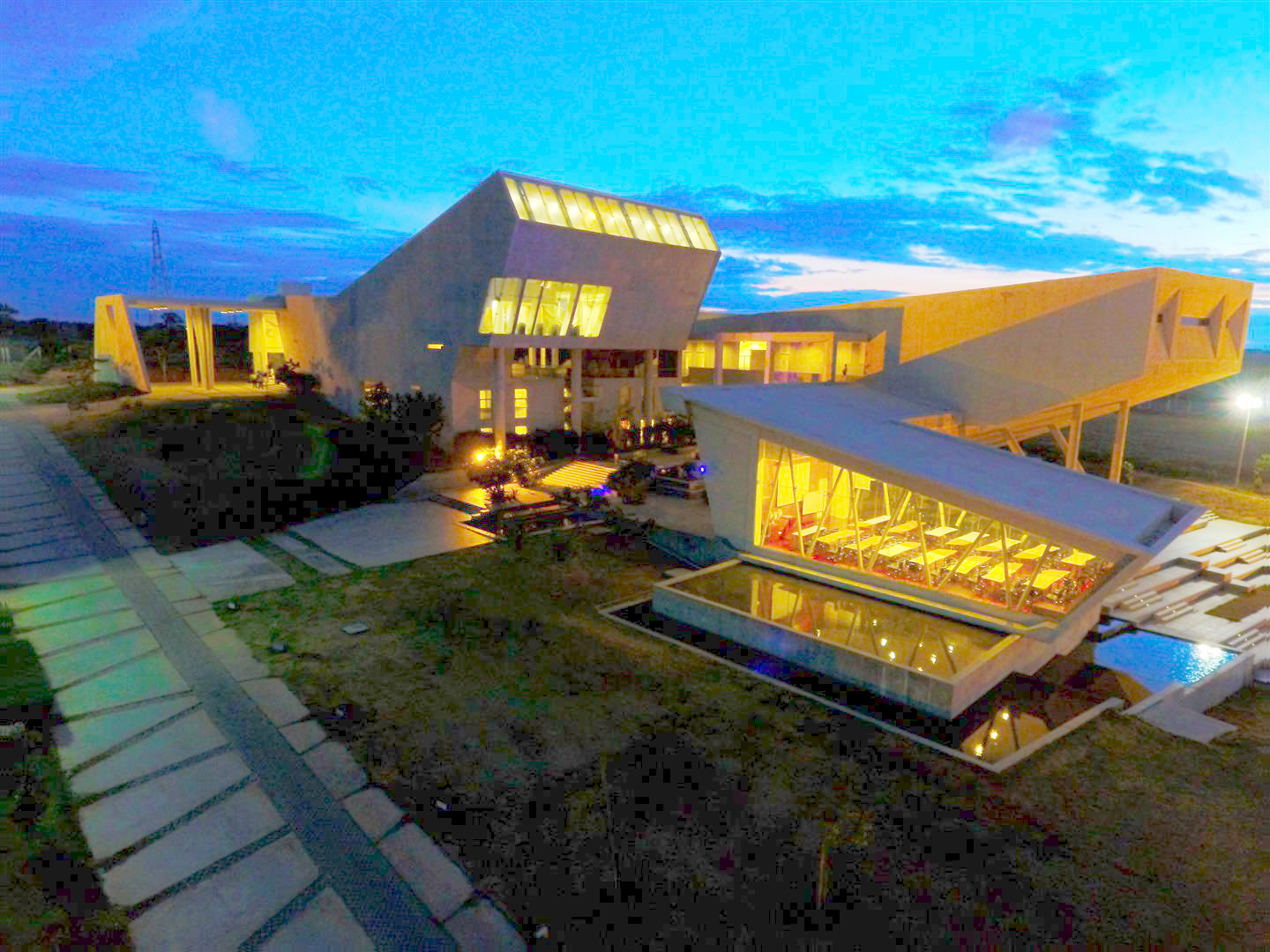
- MYRA School of Business
- Other names: MYRA, MSB
- Type: Private Business School (Autonomous)
- Established: 2012
- Founder: Kantharaj Urs
- Parent institution: Mysore Royal Academy
- Academic affiliations: AICTE
- Chairman: Dr. Ramasastry Ambarish
- Dean: Dr. Ramasastry Ambarish
- Postgraduates: PGDM
- Other students: Executive Education
- Location: Yelwal Post, Mysore, Karnataka, 571130, India
- Campus: Urban, 10 acres
- Mascot: Phoenix
- Website: www.myra.ac.in
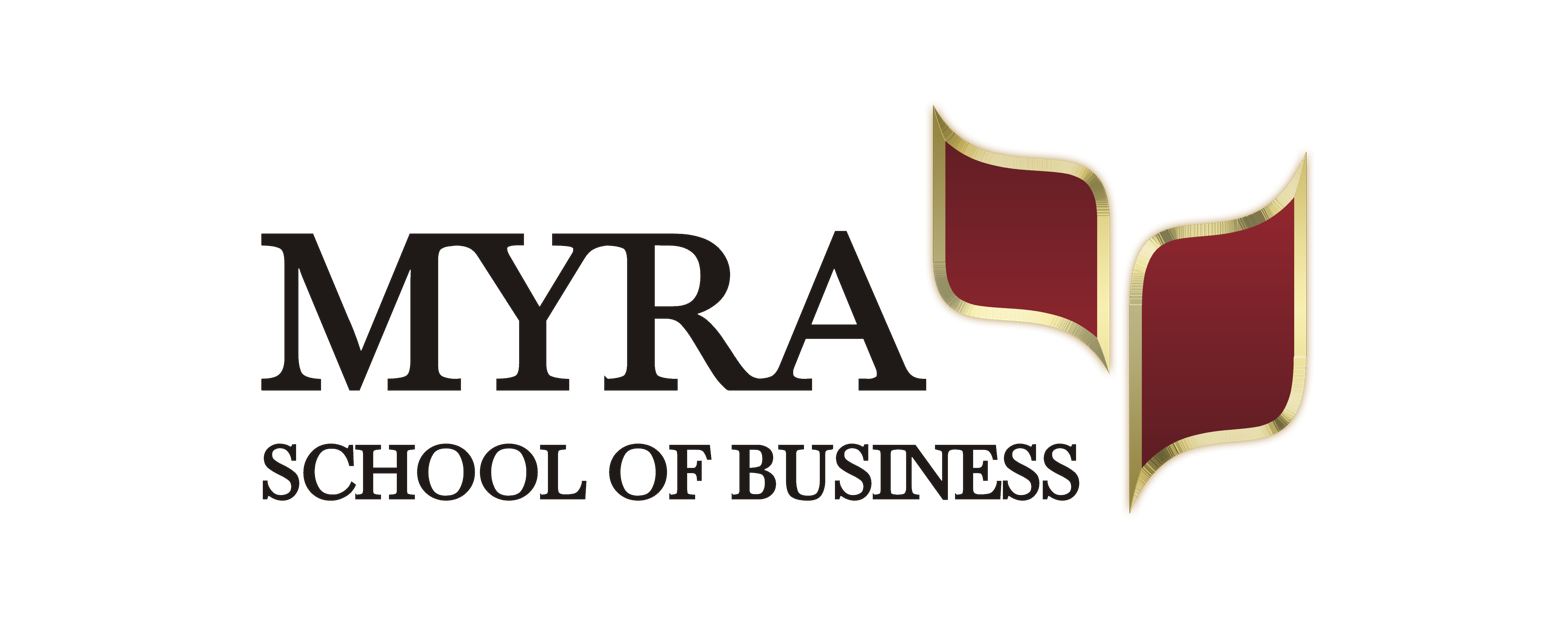

The MYRA School of Business is a business school established in 2012 in Mysore under the aegis of the Mysore Royal Academy (MYRA). The school and its campus were inaugurated on November 4, 2012.

== Programs Offered ==
- Post Graduate Diploma in Management (PGDM) (Two-year AICTE-approved MBA equivalent)
- Management Development Programs / Executive Education Programs

== Flagship Program ==
PGDM (Post Graduate Diploma in Management) has

- Foundations of Marketing
- Financial Accounting
- Fundamentals of Organizational Behavior
- Quantitative Business Analysis
- Fundamentals of Economics
- Innovation and Design Thinking
- Managerial Accounting
- Computing and IT Essentials (CITE)
- Case-based Method of Problem Solving
- MS Office Tools (Advanced Excel)
- Business Communications
- Fundamentals of Finance
- E-Commerce
- Business Research Methods
- Generative AI for Business
- Visual Analytics 1 (Power BI)
- Digital Marketing
- Management of Cyber and Digital Risk
- Visual Analytics 2 (Tableau)
- Fundamentals of Entrepreneurship & Small Business Management
- Operations Management
- Ethics, Governance & Sustainability
- Diversity and Inclusion
- Basic Career Services
- Fintech Workshop as core courses

PGDM Students study Core Courses, Elective Courses, Career Services Courses, take up internship after 1st year and do a Capstone Project in 2nd year to meet the AICTE requirement of 102 credits.

== Partner Schools ==
Partner Schools:

- Católica Lisbon School of Business & Economics (CLSBE), Portugal - PGDM Global Exchange Partner
- Julius-Maximilians-Universität, Würzburg, Germany - PGDM Global Exchange Partner

== Centres of Excellence ==
MYRA has set up Centres of Excellence:

- Center of Excellence for Entrepreneurship and Family Business (https://pratyagrafoundation.org/)
- Cyber security Center of Excellence (https://cyberversefoundation.org/)

== Campus ==
The campus buildings have been called 'avant-garde' and showcase state-of-the-art architecture.

== Milestones ==
Milestones:

- 4 November 2012 – MYRA Campus Inauguration by Shri Deepak Parekh, Chairman, HDFC.
- 17–18 December 2012 – Workshop on Governance and Political Economy in association with Warwick University.
- 6 January 2013 – Launch of Centre of Excellence in Sustainable Business Innovations (CESBI) and Distinguished Lecture by Prof. Vijay Govindarajan, Coxe Distinguished Professor, Tuck School of Business, Dartmouth College, US.
- 24 June 2013 – MYRA Founding Batch Inauguration by Mrs. Meera Sanyal, Chairperson, Royal Bank of Scotland.
- 16–17 December 2013 – Second International Conference on Big Data Analytics.
- June 2014 – Recognition by the University of Mysore as a Research Center.
- 31 May 2014 – Graduation of founding Batch Post Graduate Program for Executives (PGPX). Chief Guests: Dr. Ramadhar Singh, Distinguished Professor, IIM, Bangalore, and Mr. Ashok Mathur, MD, Madura Coats & Regional Chief Executive, South Asia, Coats Plc.
- 9 May 2015 – Graduation of founding Batch of Post Graduate Diploma in Management (PGDM) and 2nd Batch of Post Graduate Program for Executives (PGPX). Chief Guests: Prof. Rishikesha T Krishnan, Director, Indian Institute of Management, Indore, and Mr. R Gopalakrishnan, Non-Executive Director, Tata Sons
- 9 March 2016 – Launch of Centre of Excellence for Data Analytics and Business Insights (CEDABI) by Mr. David J Kasik, Senior Technical Fellow, The Boeing Company, Seattle, Washington.
- 28 March 2016 – MOU with Dalhousie University, Canada, Mr. Greg Giokas, Consul General of Canada to Bengaluru, and Dr. Carolyn Watters, Provost & Vice President, Academic, Dalhousie University, Canada.
- 20 June 2016 – Graduation of the 2nd batch of Post Graduate Diploma in Management (PGDM) & 3rd batch of Post Graduate Program for Executives (PGPX). Chief Guests: Dr. M G Parameswaran, Founder, Brand-Building.com and Shri Ranjan Mathai, Former Foreign Secretary, Government of India
- 30 July 2016 – Inauguration of Devaraj Urs Centre for Development Studies by Shri. Jairam Ramesh, Member of Parliament, Rajya Sabha, Former Minister, Government of India.
- 30 May 2017 - Signing of MOU with Cambridge Judge Business Executive Education to offer Executive Education programs in India.
- 24 June 2017 – Graduation of the 3rd batch of Post Graduate Diploma in Management (PGDM) & 4th batch of Post Graduate Program for Executives (PGPX). Chief Guests: Shri Santosh Desai, MD and CEO of Futurebrands, author & columnist, and Dr. Ramasastry Ambarish, Managing Director of RA & Son Pte Ltd., Singapore, and Member of the Governing board, MYRA
- 13 May 2018 - Graduation of the 4th batch of Post Graduate Diploma in Management (PGDM) & 5th batch of Post Graduate Program for Executives (PGPX). Chief Guest, Dr. Viral V Acharya, Deputy Governor, Reserve Bank of India & C.V. Starr Professor of Economics, New York University Stern School of Business, USA
- 1 July 2018 - University of Mysore approved Master of Business Administration (MBA) 5 years integrated course
- 29 June 2019 - Graduation of the 5th batch of Post Graduate Diploma in Management (PGDM) & 6th batch of Post Graduate Program for Executives (PGPX). Chief Guest, Mr. MD Ranganath, Additional Independent Director, HDFC Bank

Distinguished Lecture Series:

- 6 January 2013 - Distinguished Lecture 1 on "Reverse Innovation" by Dr. Vijay Govindarajan, Tuck School of Business at Dartmouth College, USA
- 25 November 2013 - Distinguished Lecture 2 on "Using Frugal Innovation to Create Market Disruption" by Mr. Suneet S Tuli, Co-Founder and Chief Executive Officer, Datawind Limited
- 19 February 2015 - Distinguished Lecture 3 on "Journey of Excellence-Beating Benchmarks and Scaling New Heights of Performance" by Lt Gen SK Gadeock, AVSM, Commandant, Defence Services Staff College
- 29 November 2015 - Distinguished Lecture 4 on "The Enduring Value of Management Education" by Dr. Dipak C Jain, Director (Dean), Sasin Graduate Institute of Business Administration, Chulalongkorn, University in Bangkok, Thailand
- 18 November 2016 - Distinguished Lecture 5 on "Economic and Social Change and Growth of Indian Business" by Dr. Sanjaya Baru, Distinguished Fellow, United Service Institute of India, New Delhi; Consulting Fellow for India International Institute of Strategic Studies, London; Honorary Senior Fellow, Centre for Policy Research, New Delhi
- 26 December 2017 - Distinguished Lecture 6 on "From Research to Action: Using Evidence to Inform Policy" by Mr. Iqbal Dhaliwal, Deputy Executive Director, Abdul Latif Jameel Poverty Action Lab (J-PAL), Massachusetts Institute of Technology (MIT), Cambridge
- 18 January 2018 - Distinguished Lecture 7 on "My Journey" by Mr. Arjun Malhotra, Co-founder, HCL Technologies, Former Chairman and CEO, Headstrong
