= International Institute of Information Technology Bangalore =

Research university in Bangalore, India

- Motto in English: Knowledge is Supreme
- Type: Deemed University
- Established: 18 September 1998
- Affiliations: UGC, NAAC, AICTE
- Chairman: Kris Gopalakrishnan
- Director: Dr. Debabrata Das
- Academic staff: 54
- Location: Electronics City, Bangalore, Karnataka, 560100, India; 12°50′41″N 77°39′47″E
- Campus: 9 acres (3.6 ha); Urban
- Language: English
- Website: www.iiitb.ac.in

The International Institute of Information Technology Bangalore (abbreviated IIIT Bangalore or IIITB) is a deemed university located in Electronics City, Bangalore, India. It is governed by a Board chaired by Kris Gopalakrishnan, co-founder of Infosys.

== Academics ==
The university offers B.Tech, Integrated M.Tech (Dual Degree B.Tech + M.Tech), M.Tech, M.S. (Research), M.Sc. (Digital Society), and Ph.D. degrees across various specialisations. It also offers postgraduate diploma and certificate programmes.

=== Rankings ===
College rankings

Engineering – India
- NIRF (2024): 74

=== Competitive Programming ===
IIIT Bangalore has qualified for the World Finals of the International Collegiate Programming Contest (ICPC) thrice, in 2017, 2018 and 2026. The student-run club CAMP (Club for Algorithms, Math and Programming) trains students for programming contests including the ICPC. The institute offers a value-added course in competitive programming, which saw 40% student enrolment in 2023.

== Student life ==
=== Hostels ===
IIIT Bangalore is a fully residential campus. It has three hostels: Lilavati (women's hostel) with around 260 single-occupancy rooms, and Bhaskara and Visveswaraya (men's hostels) with a combined 754 single-occupancy and 76 triple-occupancy rooms. A shared mess and canteen are located in Bhaskara hostel.

=== Festivals ===
- Synergy – Annual three-day technical festival held in November, featuring hackathons, coding contests, and entrepreneurship challenges.
- Infin8 – Annual three-day cultural festival, first held in 2015, typically held in January, featuring concerts, competitions, and cultural events.
- Spandan – Annual intra-sports festival primarily for alumni to compete with current students and staff.
- Umang – Annual inter-college sports festival attracting students from across Bangalore.

== Innovation ==
IIIT Bangalore established its Innovation Centre in 2009. The centre runs annual thematic accelerator programmes for startups working on frontier technologies including AI, Mobile Apps, Bots, Conversational Interfaces, and Augmented Reality.
