= List of people from Chennai =

The following people were born or based their life in the Indian city of Chennai (formerly known as Madras), Tamil Nadu (formerly known as Madras State).

== Business ==
- Aravind Srinivas, ceo and co-founder of Perplexity AI
- Geeta Aiyer, entrepreneur and business leader; founder and president of Boston Common Asset Management
- R. G. Chandramogan, chairman of Hatsun Agro Product
- Natarajan Chandrasekaran, chairman of the TATA Group
- Anil Kumar (born 1958), management consultant who pled guilty to insider trading
- Rahul Mammen Mappillai, managing director of MRF Limited
- Kalanithi Maran, chairman and managing director of the Sun Group
- Dora Metcalf, entrepreneur, mathematician and engineer
- Keshav R. Murugesh, chief executive officer and director of WNS Global Services
- A. C. Muthiah, former chairman of Southern Petrochemicals of India Corporation (SPIC)
- Shiv Nadar, founder and chairman of HCL Technologies
- Indra Nooyi, chairperson and chief executive officer of PepsiCo
- Sundar Pichai, chief executive officer of Google
- M. A. M. Ramaswamy, chairman of the Chettinad Group of Companies; ex-pro chancellor of Annamalai University, Chidambaram
- Prathap C. Reddy, chairman of Apollo Hospitals
- Naveen Selvadurai, co-founder of Foursquare
- Mallika Srinivasan, chairman and managing director of Tractors and Farm Equipment Limited
- N. Srinivasan, chairman and managing director of India Cements
- Venu Srinivasan, chairman and managing director of TVS Motors
- A. Vellayan, chairman of the Murugappa Group
- Jay Vijayan, founder of Tekion Corp
- C Vijayakumar, chief executive officer of HCL Technologies

== Education ==
- Munirathna Anandakrishnan, former chairman, Indian Institute of Technology Kanpur; former vice-chancellor, Anna University
- Bala V. Balachandran, founder, dean and chairman, Great Lakes Institute of Management
- Madhu Bhaskaran, engineer and professor, RMIT University
- V. L. Ethiraj, founder, Ethiraj College for Women
- Jeppiaar, founder, Jeppiaar Educational Trust; founder chancellor, Sathyabama University
- Ramayya Krishnan, dean, Heinz College; H. John Heinz III, W. W. Cooper and Ruth F. Cooper Professor of Management Science and Information Systems, Carnegie Mellon University
- V. M. Muralidharan, chairman, Ethiraj College for Women
- Rajalakshmi Parthasarathy, founder, Padma Seshadri Bala Bhavan
- Vallam Sundar, professor
- Subra Suresh, president, Carnegie Mellon University; former dean, School of Engineering Massachusetts Institute of Technology; former director, National Science Foundation

== Environment ==
- Arun Krishnamurthy, founder, Environmentalist Foundation of India

== Film and other entertainment ==
- A. R. Rahman (born 1967), music composer; winner of multiple awards, including two Academy Awards, two Grammy Awards and a Golden Globe Award
- Ajith Kumar, thespian, racer
- Allu Arjun, actor
- Ashok Amritraj, Hollywood producer
- Arvind Swamy, actor, businessman
- C. Joseph Vijay (Chief Minister of Tamil Nadu), actor, playback singer (International Achievement Recognition Award) winner
- Dhanush, thespian, playback singer, producer
- Engelbert Humperdinck (born 1936), pop singer
- Hema Malini, actress
- Ilaiyaraja, music composer, symphonic maestro
- Jayabharathi, actress
- Jayasudha, actress
- K. V. Mahadevan, music composer
- Kajol, actress
- Kamal Haasan, thespian, director, producer, screenwriter
- Keerthy Suresh, actress
- Lakshmi Manchu, actress
- Lakshmi Narayan, actress
- Lisa Haydon, actress
- M. S. Viswanathan, music composer
- Mahesh Babu, actor
- Mary Hignett (born 1916), actress
- Olive Rae, soprano, actress
- Padma Lakshmi, cookbook writer, actress, model, television host
- Pete Best (born 1941), early Beatles drummer
- Priya Anand, actress
- Puneeth Rajkumar, Kannada actor
- Rajini Kanth, actor, producer, screenwriter
- Ram Charan Teja, actor
- Rekha, actress
- Rochelle Rao, Indian actress, Miss India International 2012
- S. Janaki, playback singer
- S. P. Balasubrahmanyam, music composer, playback singer
- Samantha Ruth Prabhu, actress
- Santhanam, actor
- Shiva Rajkumar, Kannada actor
- Shivaji Ganesan, actor; first International Award winner of India
- Shruthi Hassan, actress
- Siddharth Narayan, actor
- Sivakarthikeyan, thespian
- Sridevi, actress
- Sripriya, actress
- Srividya, actress
- Sumalatha, actress
- Sundeep Kishan, actor
- Suriya, thespian
- Trisha (actress)
- Vidya Vox, YouTuber, musician
- Vijay Sethupathi, thespian
- Vijay Yesudas (born 1979), playback singer
- Vikram, thespian
- Vishal Krishna (born 1977), actor, film producer
- Vyjayanthimala, actress
- Yuvan Shankar Raja, first Cyprus International Film Festival-winning creative music composer

== Directors ==
- A. R. Murugadoss, Tamil film director
- Atlee Kumar, Tamil and Hindi film director
- K. Balachander, Tamil film director
- Karthik Subburaj, Tamil film director
- Lokesh Kanagaraj, Tamil film director
- Mani Ratnam, Tamil film director
- Nalan Kumarasamy, Tamil film director
- Pa.Ranjith, Tamil film director
- S. Shankar, Tamil film director
- Selvaraghavan, Tamil film director
- Vetrimaran, Tamil film director

== Literature and visual arts ==
- R.K. Narayan (1906–2001), writer
- Achuthanand Tanjore Ravi (born 1991), photographer
- V. D. Trivadi, humorist

== Marketing and sales ==
- Vishnu Hari, Co- founder, Social Eagle

== Politics ==
- Subramaniam Iswaran (born 1962), known as S. Iswaran, Singaporean politician
- Pramila Jayapal, U.S. representative for Washington

== Religion ==
- Jesu Pudumai Doss (born 1967), Catholic priest; professor and dean, Faculty of Canon Law, Salesian Pontifical University, Rome
- Sri Sabhapati Swami (born 1840), yogi, writer

== Scientists ==
- Subrahmanyan Chandrasekhar, recipient, Nobel Prize in Physics
- Alan Garnett Davenport, engineer
- Shyamala Gopalan, breast-cancer researcher; mother of former vice president of the United States Kamala Harris
- A. P. J. Abdul Kalam, physicist; former president of India
- Kariamanickam Srinivasa Krishnan, physicist (co-discoverer of Raman scattering)
- C. V. Raman, recipient, Nobel Prize in Physics
- Srinivasa Ramanujan, mathematician; Fellow of the Royal Society
- Kannan Soundararajan, mathematician
- Subra Suresh, engineer, materials scientist, academic
- M. S. Swaminathan, geneticist, plant breeder, administrator and humanitarian
- John Henry Constantine Whitehead (1904–1960), British mathematician

== Social entrepreneurs ==
- Kirthi Jayakumar

== Sports ==
- Anand Amritraj (born 1952), tennis player, businessman
- Vijay Amritraj (born 1953), tennis player, sports commentator, actor
- Viswanathan Anand (born 1969), chess grandmaster; undisputed world chess champion from 2007 until 2013
- PK Arumugam, speedcuber
- Ravichandran Ashwin, cricketer
- Naresh Babu, professorial motorcycle road racer
- Hemang Badani, former cricketer
- Subramaniam Badrinath, former cricketer
- Lakshmipathy Balaji, cricketer
- Karun Chandhok (born 1984), racing driver, Formula One, sports commentator
- Joshna Chinappa (born 1986), squash player, British Squash Championship
- Gukesh Dommaraju (born 2006), chess grandmaster; undisputed world chess champion since 2024
- Akbar Ebrahim (born 1963), racing driver, cricketer
- Edward Foord (1825–1899), cricketer
- George Gowan (1818–1890), cricketer
- Nasser Hussain (born 1968), former cricketer
- Sharath Kamal (born 1982), table-tennis player
- Thirush Kamini, cricketer
- Dinesh Karthik (born 1985), cricketer
- Rajini Krishnan, motorcycle racer
- Ramanathan Krishnan, tennis player
- Ramesh Krishnan, tennis player and coach
- Buchi Babu Naidu, father of South Indian cricket
- M. Baliah Naidu, cricketer
- Dipika Pallikal (born 1991), squash player, WISPA titles; first Indian woman to break into the top ten in the WSA rankings
- Aditya Patel (born 1988), professional racing driver
- Rameshbabu Praggnanandhaa (born 2005), chess grandmaster
- Jack Pritchard (1895–1936), cricketer
- Mahaveer Raghunathan (born 1998), racing driver
- W. V. Raman, former cricketer
- Ramkumar Ramanathan, tennis player
- Cotah Ramaswami, cricketer, tennis player
- Sadagoppan Ramesh, former cricketer
- Ravivarman Sharmila, carrom champion
- Krishnamachari Srikkanth (born 1959), former cricketer
- Washington Sundar, cricketer
- Roopa Unnikrishnan, former sports-rifle shooter; Commonwealth Games gold medalist
- Srinivasaraghavan Venkataraghavan, former cricketer
- Murali Vijay (born 1984), cricketer

== Miscellaneous ==
- Maulvi Ahmadullah Shah Faizabadi Madrasi or Ahmadullah Shah (1787–1858), Indian freedom fighter
- General Paramasiva Prabhakar Kumaramangalam, DSO, MBE (1913–2000), 6th chief of Indian army
- Georgiana Fanny Shipley Daniell, philanthropist
- Nugent Grant, lawyer
- Geeta Madhavan, lawyer
- Praveena Solomon, crematorium manager
- Abhinandan Varthaman, wing commander in the Indian Air Force
