= Doss (surname) =

Doss is a German surname. Notable people with the surname include:

- Alan Doss (born 1945), British United Nations official and foundation president
- Alan Doss (born ?), American drummer, keyboardist, bass guitarist, manager, and producer for the Galactic Cowboys
- Barrett Doss (born 1989), American actor and singer
- Barry Doss (born ?), American politician
- Bill Doss (1968–2012), American musician and record company founder
- Conya Doss (born 1972), American singer, songwriter, and multi-instrumentalist
- Debi Doss (born ?), American-born British photographer and singer
- Desmond Doss (1919–2006), American army corporal and combat medic; only conscientious objector to ever receive the US Medal of Honor
- Doyle Doss (born ?), American inventor
- D. S. Ravindra Doss (1945–2012), Indian journalist, newspaper editor, and union president
- Edwin A. Doss (1914–1996), American fighter pilot and air force commander
- Erika Doss (fl.1980s–2020s), professor of American Studies at the University of Notre Dame
- E. W. Doss (fl.1869–1871), American politician
- Hansjürgen Doss (born 1936), German politician
- J. D. Doss (1861–1927), American politician
- James Doss (1939–2012), American mystery novelist and Los Alamos National Laboratory electrical engineer
- Jesu Pudumai Doss (born 1967), Indian Roman Catholic priest, professor, and author
- Joe Morris Doss (born 1943), American Episcopal bishop, lawyer, author, and playwright
- Keelan Doss (born 1996), American football player
- K. S. R. Doss (1936–2012), Indian film director and editor
- Kurt Doss (born 1996), American actor
- LaRoy Doss (1936–2004), American basketball player and car dealership owner
- Lorenzo Doss (born 1994), American football player
- Mark S. Doss (born 1957), American operatic bass-baritone vocalist
- Mike Doss (born 1981), American football player, foundation founder, and medical salesman
- Nannie Doss (1905–1965), American serial murderer
- Nate Doss (born 1985), American disc golfer
- Noble Doss (1920–2009), American football player
- Reggie Doss (born 1956), American football player
- Samuel W. Doss Jr. (1927–2017), American politician from Georgia
- Tandon Doss (born 1989), American football player
- Terri Lynn Doss (born 1965), American model and actress
- Tykeem Doss (born 1999), American football player
