= M. Suryanarayan =

Indian cricketer (1930–2010)

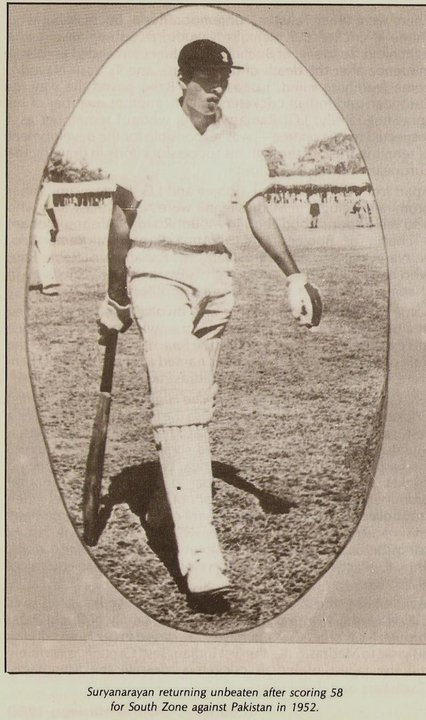
- Born: 1 February 1930; Madras Presidency, India
- Died: 2010 (aged 79–80); India
- Occupation: Indian cricketer

Mothavarapu Suryanarayan (1930 – 2010) was an Indian first-class cricketer who was born on 1 February 1930 during Madras presidency. M. Suryanarayan is the first son of M.Baliah Naidu and the Grandson of Buchi Babu Naidu who is also known as the 'Father of South Indian Cricket' the doyen of Madras Cricket. He was also a member of the First Ranji Trophy triumph team of Tamil Nadu in 1954–1955, which the Madras team won against Holkar. He was a right-handed batsman and a right-arm medium bowler. The Hindu describing his Cricket, once said: " His batting resembles very closely that of his father -dashing and carefree -and his cover-drive, a joy to watch, has amazing impetus..."And it added that he had "enriched Madras sport as his father had". His only younger brother M.M Kumar represented in the Ranji Trophy.

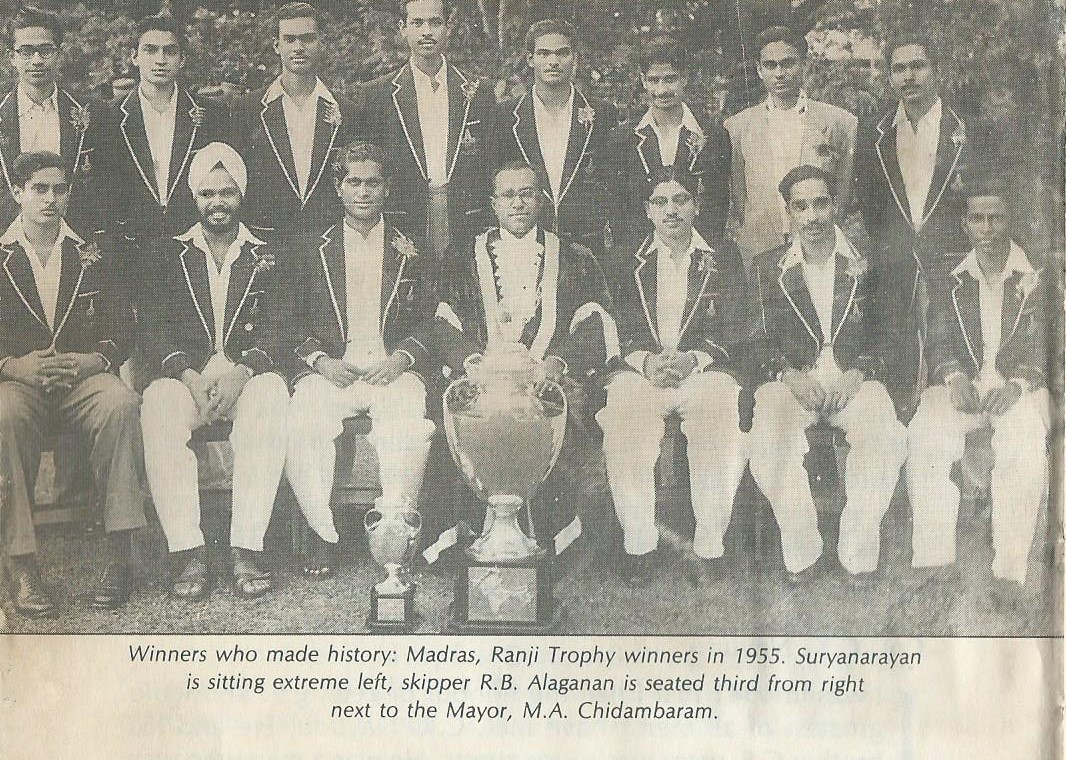
The First Ranji Trophy Triumph Team of Tamil Nadu in 1954-1955

== Career ==
M. Suryanarayan was a stylish right-hand middle order batsman who played off and cover drives in particularly elegant fashion. A stalwart of Madras cricket in the forties and fifties, `Suri' as he was popularly known, played 11 matches for the state in the Ranji Trophy and earned selection for the Indian team for the fifth and final `Test' against the SJOC team at Lucknow in 1953–54. Suryanarayan proved his mettle by scoring two unbeaten half-centuries against bowlers of the class of Frank Worrell, Fazal Mahmood, Amir Elahi, Khan Mohamed, Loxton, Peter Loader, and Jim McConnel. He Captained Madras and Mysore at the highest levels, besides scoring three centuries before lunch in first-class cricket in Madras and Bangalore. He won the All-India University Tennis Doubles title, Partnering Ramanathan Krishnan, and played in the qualifying rounds of the doubles tournament at Wimbledon. He also won several titles in Table tennis and golf in South Indian Competitions.

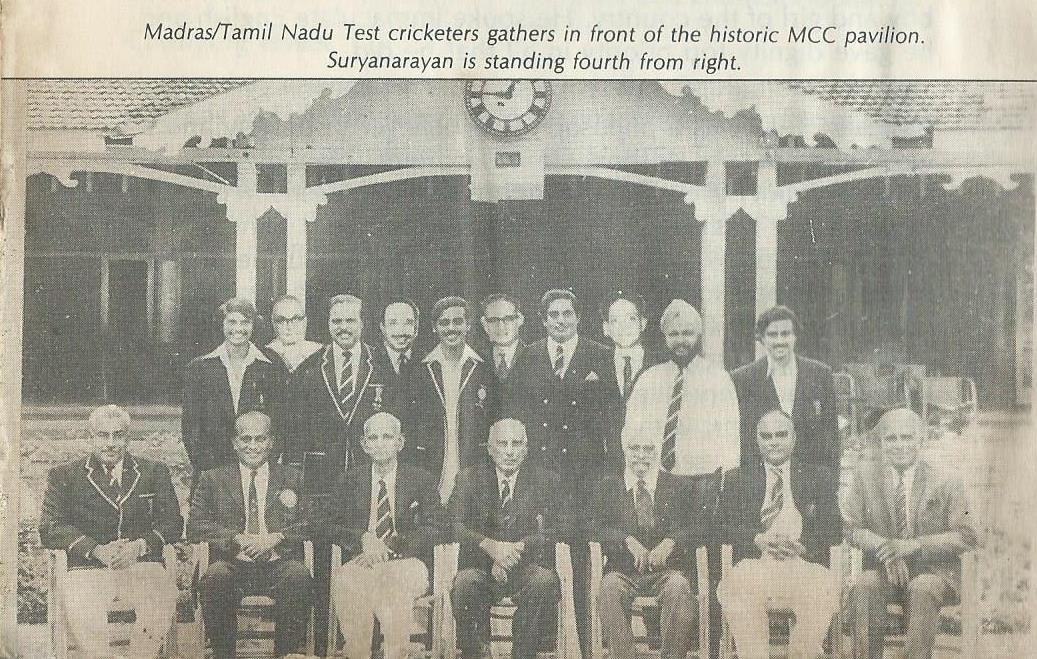
Tamil Nadu Test Cricketers gathers in front of the historic MCC Pavilion

== Later life ==
M. Suryanarayan followed in his father's footsteps in many ways. He was a natural at all ball games. M. Suryanarayan did a University of Madras Science degree from Presidency College, then moved into the British Indian world of commerce in Madras and Bangalore before going into business on his own. He also spent some years abroad promoting Indian handlooms on behalf of the Government of India. He published a book written by Suri & Raja (ed), Buchi Babu (Father of Madras Cricket) and his sporting clan, 1993.
