= Praveena (given name) =

Praveena is a given name. Notable people with the name include:

- Praveena, Indian actress
- Praveena Bandara, 18th Chairperson of the Sri Lanka Army Women's Corps Seva Vanitha Unit
- Praveena Bhagyaraj (died 1983), Indian actress
- Praveena Solomon, Indian crematorium manager
