= Madras Presidency Match =

Annual first-class cricket match

The Madras Presidency Match was an annual first-class cricket fixture played in Madras (now Chennai) from the 1915–16 season to 1951–52 between teams called the Indians and the Europeans (i.e., Europeans who were living in India). The matches were played in the Chepauk Grounds (the present M. A. Chidambaram Stadium) usually in mid-January around the time of Pongal festival, and the fixture was sometimes called the Pongal match. Of the 37 matches played, 33 were first-class and the Indians won 15 of those, the Europeans eight and ten were drawn.

== Background ==
The Presidency Match was the idea of Buchi Babu Naidu of the Madras United Club (MUC) and Percival Partridge of the Madras Cricket Club (MCC). The MCC, at the time, was an exclusively white organisation and the MUC was founded by Buchi Babu as a similar cricket club for the Indians. Shortly before the first match Buchi Babu, who was to captain the Indian side, died of a heart attack. The match still went ahead, mainly because of the efforts of B. Subramaniam, an assistant of Buchi Babu. The Indian side was captained by B. S. Ramulu Naidu and the Europeans by Partridge. This "Presidency Hindus" and "Presidency Europeans" match was to have been played between 29 December 1908 and 1 January 1909, but it was abandoned because of rain without the first innings being completed.

Subramanian organised an annual Buchi Babu Memorial Tournament from 1909 and the Europeans v Indians series was not revived until the 1915–16 season. This match, which began on the last day of 1915, is considered the first Madras Presidency Match.

== The matches ==
The Indians generally dominated the series and it was 1920–21 before the Europeans scored their first victory. The length of the match was increased from two to three days in the third year and gates were introduced in 1921. The 1935 match was cancelled because of a dispute about sharing the profits from the previous year between the MCC and the Indian Cricket Federation.

The teams occasionally brought in players from outside the Madras Presidency. C. K. Nayudu, the Maharajkumar of Vizianagram, and Phiroze Palia all played for the Indians. In 1921, C. K. Nayudu hit 128 before lunch on the first day, an innings that included a famous hit which cleared "the boundary wall at the southern end of the MCC compound – to land near a coconut tree 50 yards from the MCC grounds. The hit was easily above 150 yards from the batting crease". In 1927, Humphrey Ward of the Europeans hit 173, setting a record for the highest score in the series. It was bettered the next day by M. C. Sivasankaran, who made 174 for the Indians.

== Decline ==
The Second World War caused the cancellation of the 1942 match and, from then, the series went into decline. By the late 1940s, with the exodus of the British after Partition, the Europeans struggled to raise a team. As a consequence, the number of spectators saw a steady decrease. No match was played in 1949 and 1950 and those for 1951 and 1952 were two-day affairs and not first-class. The match in the latter year was watched by a crowd of six people, four of whom were journalists. This was the last Madras Presidency match.

An attempt was made in 1956 to revive the competition and a match was played between Indian and European members of the Madras Cricket Club. The Indians won by an innings and the experiment was never repeated.

== Results ==
Season	Captains	Notes	Ref
1908–09	B. S. Ramulu Naidu (Ind); P. W. Partridge (Eur)	Abandoned due to rain with only one day's play possible. Not a first-class match.	
1914–15	Unknown (MUC); Unknown (MCC)	The teams were called Madras Cricket Club (MCC; Europeans only) and Madras United Club (MUC; non-Europeans). MUC won by an innings and 112 runs. Not a first-class match.	
1915–16	B. Subramanian (Ind); R. D. Richmond (Eur)	Match drawn.	
1916–17	B. Subramanian; P. W. Partridge	Indians won by 5 wickets.	
1917–18	Unknown; Unknown	Indians won by 91 runs. Britten-Jones took the only hat-trick in the tournament.	
1918–19	C. K. Krishnaswamy; R. D. Richmond	Indians won by 4 wickets.	
1919–20	Unknown; Unknown	Europeans won by 68 runs.	
1920–21	C. R. Ganapathy; K. O. Goldie	Indians won by an innings and 14 runs.	
1921–22	M. Baliah; E. W. C. Bradfield	Match drawn.	
1922–23	B. Subramaniam; E. W. C. Bradfield	Indians won by 10 wickets.	
1923–24	Unknown; Unknown	Indians won by an innings and 27 runs.	
1924–25	C. R. Ganapathy; H. P. Ward	Europeans won by 125 runs.	
1925–26	N. N. Swarna; H. P. Ward	Europeans won by 66 runs.	
1926–27	C. K. Nayudu; C. P. Johnstone	Match drawn.	
1927–28	Unknown; C. P. Johnstone	Match drawn.	
1928–29	C. K. Nayudu; C. P. Johnstone	Europeans won by 8 wickets.	
1929–30	M. Venkataramanjulu; H. P. Ward	Indians won by 10 runs.	
1930–31	Maharajkumar of Vizianagram; H. P. Ward	Europeans won by an innings and 6 runs.	
1931–32	Maharajkumar of Vizianagram; H. P. Ward	Match drawn.	
1932–33	Maharajkumar of Vizianagram; H. P. Ward	Indians won by an innings and 109 runs.	
1933–34	M. Baliah; H. P. Ward	Europeans won by 31 runs.	
1935–36	M. Baliah; C. P. Johnstone	Indians won by an innings and 87 runs.	
1936–37	M. J. Gopalan; H. P. Ward	Indians won by 247 runs.	
1937–38	C. Ramaswami; C. P. Johnstone	Match drawn.	
1938–39	M. J. Gopalan; C. P. Johnstone	Indians won by 4 wickets.	
1939–40	M. J. Gopalan; C. P. Johnstone	Indians won by 4 wickets.	
1940–41	M. J. Gopalan; C. P. Johnstone	Indians won by 97 runs.	
1942–43	M. J. Gopalan; C. P. Johnstone	Europeans won by 8 wickets.	
1943–44	A. G. Ram Singh; C. P. Johnstone	Match drawn.	
1944–45	M. O. Srinivasan; C. P. Johnstone	Europeans won by 8 wickets.	
1945–46	M. J. Gopalan; C. P. Johnstone	Indians won by 5 wickets.	
1946–47	G. Parthasarathi; C. P. Johnstone	Indians won by an innings and 63 runs.	
1947–48	G. Parthasarathi; C. P. Johnstone	Match drawn.	
1950–51	Unknown; Unknown	The 1950–51 and 1951–52 matches were not first-class. Both were drawn.	
1951–52	Unknown; Unknown	The 1950–51 and 1951–52 matches were not first-class. Both were drawn.	

== Statistics ==
Highest individual score (Indians)	174, M. C. Sivasankaran	1927
Highest individual score (Europeans)	173, H. P. Ward	1927
Best bowling, innings (Indians)	8 for 14, A. G. Ram Singh	1936
Best bowling, innings (Europeans)	8 for 43, A. G. Penfold	1926
Best bowling, team (Indians)	13 for 49, A. G. Ram Singh	1936
Best bowling, team (Europeans)	13 for 115, J. H. Parsons	1920
Highest total (Indians)	458	1927
Highest total (Europeans)	570 for 7 declared	1931
