= International cricket in 1940–41 =

International cricket season

The 1940–41 international cricket season was from September 1940 to April 1941. There were no international tournaments held during this season due to initial impact of the Second World War.

== Season overview ==
International tours
Start date	Home team	Away team	Results [Matches]			
Start date	Home team	Away team	Test	ODI	FC	LA
20 December 1940	India	Ceylon	—	—	1–1 [3]	—

== December ==
=== Ceylon in India ===
Three-day Match Series
No.	Date	Home captain	Away captain	Venue	Result
Match 1	20–22 December	C. P. Johnstone	SS Jayawickreme	Madras Cricket Club Ground, Madras	Ceylon by 3 wickets
Match 2	26–28 December	C. K. Nayudu	SS Jayawickreme	Eden Gardens, Calcutta	Match drawn
Match 3	31 Dec–2 January	D. B. Deodhar	SS Jayawickreme	Brabourne Stadium, Bombay	India XI by an innings and 110 runs

== See also ==
- Cricket in World War II
