= Percival Partridge =

English cricketer

Personal information
- Full name: Percival Walter Partridge
- Born: 27 August 1879; Witney, Oxfordshire, England
- Died: 12 July 1964 (aged 84); Esher, Surrey, England
- Batting: Unknown
- Bowling: Unknown

Domestic team information
- Years: Team
- 1898–1901: Norfolk
- 1916/17–1920/21: Europeans

Career statistics
Competition	First-class
Matches	3
Runs scored	85
Batting average	14.16
100s/50s	–/–
Top score	42
Catches/stumpings	2/–
- Source: Cricinfo, 19 November 2022

Percival Walter Partridge (27 August 1879 — 12 July 1964) was an English first-class cricketer and solicitor.

Partridge was born in August 1879 at Witney, Oxfordshire. He was educated at Felsted School. Partridge played minor counties cricket for Norfolk from 1898 to 1901, making 19 appearances in the Minor Counties Championship. He went to India in 1903, where he practiced as a solicitor at the family law firm King & Partridge in Madras. A member of the Madras Cricket Club, Partridge was instrumental in allowing for the indigenous members of the Madras Union Club to have lunch in the cricket pavilion of the Madras Cricket Club Ground during a game between the two teams, with the usual custom being for indigenous players to have their lunch under trees outside the pavilion. Partridge played first-class cricket in Madras on three occasions for the Europeans cricket team, all against the Indians in the Madras Presidency Matches between 1917 and 1920. He scored 85 runs in his three matches, at an average of 14.16, with a highest score of 42. He additional stood as an umpire in one Madras Presidency Match in 1927. Retiring to England, Partridge died at Esher in July 1964.
