= Milk Mantra =

Dairy foods company based in Odisha, India

- Type: Private
- Industry: Food, dairy, health food
- Founded: August 2009
- Founder: Srikumar Misra
- Headquarters: Bhubaneswar, Odisha, India
- Area served: Odisha, Bengaluru, Hyderabad
- Key people: Srikumar Misra (Founder & Director); Rashima Misra (Cofounder & Executive Director); Lt Col Ashit Mahapatra (Ex-Cofounder)
- Products: Milk, curd, buttermilk, lassi, cottage cheese, mishti doi, chhenapoda
- Brands: Milky Moo, Moo Shake and Daily Moo
- Revenue: ₹248 crore (US$26 million) (FY 2021)
- Parent: Hatsun Agro Product
- Website: www.milkmantra.com

Milk Mantra is an Indian dairy foods company based in Odisha. Founded in August 2009 by Srikumar Misra and cofounded by Rashima Misra and Lt Col Ashit Mahapatra, the company became operational in 2012.

In January 2025, Milk Mantra and its Milky Moo brand were acquired by Hatsun Agro Product Ltd (HAP) for ₹233 crore.

== History ==
Milk Mantra was founded in August 2009 by Srikumar Misra, a former executive with Tata Group, Rashima Misra and Lt Col Ashit Mahapatra. In 2011, it received its first series of investments from VC firms Eight Roads Ventures, Aavishkaar Venture Management Services and angel investors. The company started its operations in early 2012 with the commissioning of a factory in Gop, Odisha.

As of 2016, it sources its milk from over 70,000 farmers in the state of Odisha, called the Ethical Milk Sourcing (EMS) programme.

In 2017, it raised $10 million funding from Neev Fund and other investors.

In 2020, Milk Mantra raised US$10 million debt funding from US DFC. It also received technical assistance grant of US$350,000.

In 2021, the company launched its own D2C dairy & subscription app DailyMoo.

== Products ==
Milk Mantra manufactures and sells dairy products like buttermilk, curd, probiotic yogurt, cheese, cottage cheese, milkshakes, dairy based desserts and other beverages under the brand Milky Moo.

Under the brand Moo Shake, the company also manufactures and sells flavored milkshakes and a beverage which is blended with curcumin.

== Production ==
Milk Mantra has its main processing plant at Gop in Puri city of Odisha. It has a processing capacity of 2,40,000 liters of milk per day. It also has a plant in the neighbouring Sambalpur which can process 90,000 liters per day.

== Honors ==
- Fast Company 10 most innovative Asia-Pacific companies of 2021 and most innovative companies of 2020 in India
- 2019 McNulty Prize
- 2016 Frost & Sullivan Awards for Product of the Year for MooShake
