= Humphrey Ward =

English cricketer

Humphrey Plowden "H.P." Ward (20 January 1899 – 16 December 1946) was an English amateur first-class cricketer, who played for Oxford University (1919–1921), Europeans (India) (1921/22–1945/46), Madras (1926/27–1938/39), H. D. G. Leveson Gower's XI (1931), Indian XI (1933/34) and the Madras Governor's XI (1941/42) and in one match for Yorkshire County Cricket Club in 1920. He also played for the Yorkshire Second XI in 1920, and for the Marylebone Cricket Club (MCC) from 1931 to 1935. He won an Oxford Blue for cricket from 1919 to 1921 and also played football for Oxford. He was a member of the Great Britain football squad at the 1920 Summer Olympics but did not feature in the competition.

Ward graduated from Oxford University in 1921 and joined the Indian Forest Service. On moving to Madras in 1921, he joined the Europeans cricket team and played for the team against Indians in the Madras Presidency Matches. He holds the record for the highest run aggregate in the Madras Presidency matches. He was the team's principal wicket-keeper and captained the team intermittently between 1921 and 1946.

Ward also played for Madras in the Ranji Trophy from 1934 to 1946, including two internationals against the Australian Services and an All Australian eleven respectively. A right-handed batsman and wicket-keeper, he scored 3,571 runs at 32.46, with a best score of 173 against the 'Indians'. He made four centuries in all, and 21 fifties in his 66 first-class matches. He held 67 catches and completed 18 stumpings.

Ward was born in Amotherby, Malton, Yorkshire, England and died in Thornton-le-Dale, Yorkshire.
