= Arun Icecreams =

Indian ice cream brand

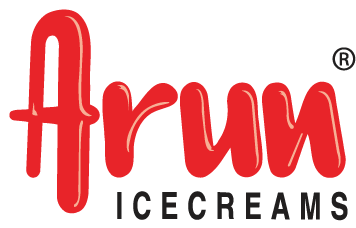
- Product type: Ice cream
- Current owner: Hatsun Agro Product
- Country: India
- Introduced: 1970; 56 years ago
- Tagline: "Just Slice It"
- Website: arunicecreams.in; www.hap.in/arun/

Arun Icecreams is an Indian ice cream brand owned by Hatsun Agro Product, a Tamil Nadu based company.

== History ==
Arun Icecreams was founded by Mr. Ganesan in 1970. In 1985, the brand topped the ice cream sales in terms of volume list, in Tamil Nadu. By 1999, around 700 outlets were present in Tamil Nadu, Karnataka, Kerala and Andhra Pradesh, and 2,300 parlors as of 2018, and the brand extended to Maharashtra and Odisha.

Currently, Arun Ice Cream is the Jersey sponsor of Mohun Bagan Football Club.

== See also ==
- List of ice cream brands
