= R. G. Chandramogan =

Indian dairyman and entrepreneur (born 1949)

- Born: 1 March 1949 (age 77); Thiruthangal, Madras State (now Tamil Nadu), India
- Occupations: Chairman and MD of Hatsun Agro Product
- Children: Sathyan Chandramogan, Deviga Suresh
- Website: www.hap.in

Notes
- Indian

R. G. Chandramogan is an Indian dairyman and entrepreneur from Tamil Nadu. He is the chairman of Hatsun Agro Product Ltd, the largest private-sector dairy company in India. The company's well-known brands Arun, Arokya and Hatsun are leaders in the segments of ice creams, milk and curd amongst private dairies in India. He is one of the first generation of entrepreneurs from Thiruthangal, Sivakasi. He is one of the 100 Indian billionaires, with a fortune of $2.5 billion. He has a net worth of US$2.5 billion as of March 2022.

He has been honoured with Padma Shri award on 26 January 2025, India's fourth-highest civilian award, for his contributions in the field of Trade and Industry.

== Early life and career ==
Chandramogan was born in Thiruthangal, Virudhunagar District, Tamil Nadu. He founded Arun Icecreams.

In an interview with Sify, he shared his interest in sports, especially in playing badminton and has won the veteran's championship for two years. He also enjoys reading books.

== Awards and recognition ==
On March 4, 2024, R.G. Chandramogan received the Lifetime Achievement Award by Indian Dairy Association at Hyderabad’s Hi-Tex Convention Centre for his impactful work in the dairy sector.

On January 26, 2025, R.G. Chandramohan received Padma Shree award, India's fourth-highest civilian award, for his contributions in the field of Trade and Industry.
