= Bharath Institute of Higher Education and Research =

Private university located in Chennai, TN

- Former names: Bharath Engineering College; Bharath University
- Motto: Win the world by innovation. To the stars by hard work.
- Established: 1984; 42 years ago
- Affiliations: UGC, AIU, AICTE
- Chairman: S. Jagathrakshakan
- Chancellor: Dr. Mohamed Rela
- Vice-Chancellor: Dr. M. Sundararajan (I/C)
- Location: Chennai, Tamil Nadu, India; 12.907748°N 80.142163°E
- Campus: Urban Around 305 acres (123 ha) spread across 4 campuses.
- Accreditation: NAAC ('A' Grade)
- Website: www.bharathuniv.ac.in
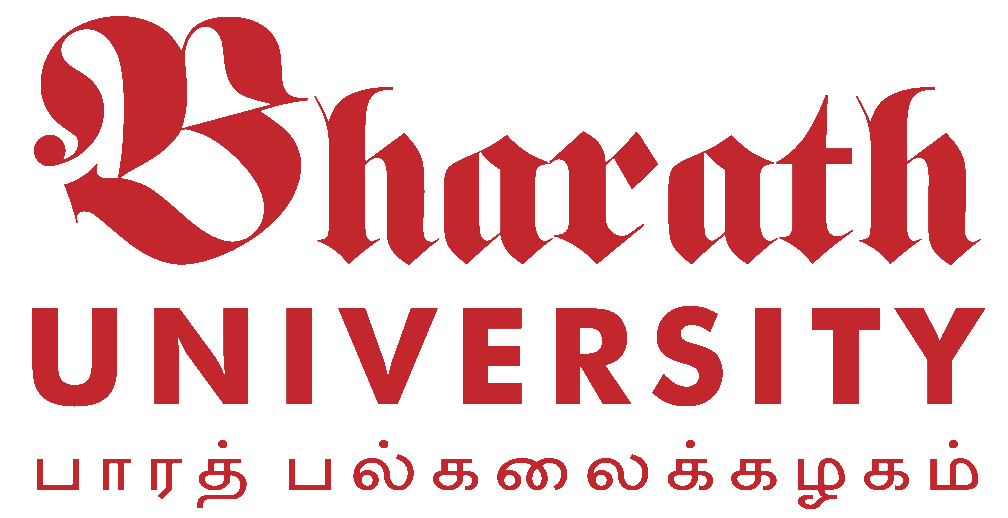

Bharath Institute of Higher Education and Research (BIHER), also known as Bharath Institute of Science and Technology (BIST), informally referred to as Bharath University, and formerly known as Bharath Engineering College, is a private deemed university located in Chennai, the capital of Tamil Nadu, India. It is also one of the universities recognized by the University Grants Commission (UGC).

== History ==
Bharath Institute of Higher Education and Research was founded in 1984 as Bharath Institute of Science and Technology by S. Jagathrakshakan. It is among the first autonomous engineering colleges in Tamil Nadu. It was first affiliated to Madras University followed by Anna University. The institute was awarded deemed university status in 2002 by the University Grants Commission. Hence, the name was changed to Bharath Institute of Higher Education and Research. In September 2006, it was renamed as Bharath University per a decree issued by the University Grants Commission enabling deemed universities to include the word "university" in their names. In November 2017, it was again renamed as Bharath Institute of Higher Education and Research following a directive issued by University Grants Commission and an order by the Supreme Court of India to all the deemed universities in India.

== Academics ==
The university offers undergraduate, postgraduate and doctoral programs in fields such as science, technology, engineering, medicine (including dentistry, physiotherapy and nursing), arts and management.

== Awards ==
- It was awarded the "Best Private University of the Year" by World Education Congress for 2014.
- The university was awarded the "Best Multi Stream University" in 2014 by ASSOCHAM.

== Campuses ==
Bharath University has five campuses, four in Chennai and one in Puducherry. The details of the campuses and their departments are in the list below.

=== Bharath Institute of Science and Technology ===
This is the main campus of the deemed university which was established in 1984. It is in Chennai and was initially known as Bharath Engineering College. The name was changed to Bharath Institute of Higher Education and Research in 2002 when it attained deemed university status. In 2003, the college was again renamed as Bharath Institute of Science and Technology and brought under Bharath University with the other constituent colleges.

Departments:

- Aeronautical Engineering
- Aerospace Engineering
- Automobile Engineering
- Biomedical Engineering
- Industrial Biotechnology
- Agriculture
- Architecture
- Chemistry
- Civil Engineering
- Computer Application
- Computer Science & Engineering
- Electronics and Communication Engineering
- Electrical and Electronics Engineering
- Electronics and Instrumentation Engineering
- Electronics and Telecommunication Engineering
- English
- Genetic Engineering
- Information Technology
- Mathematics
- Management Studies
- Mechanical Engineering
- Mechatronics
- Physics

=== Bharath School of Arts & Science ===
It was previously known as Sri Lakshmi Ammal Engineering College and later turned into an arts and science college under Bharath Group of Institutions. It is situated in Thiruvanchery next to Selaiyur, Tambaram.

Departments:

- Business Administration
- Biotechnology & Microbiology
- Chemistry
- Commerce
- Computer Science and Computer Applications
- English
- Maths
- Physics
- Public Administration and Governance
- Tamil
- Tourism and Hospitality Management
- Visual Communication

Institutions in the same campus:

- Bharath Institute of Law
- Bharath Polytechnic College
- Shree Bharath Vidhyashram
- Bharath Faculty of Pharmacy

=== Sree Balaji Medical College and Hospital ===
This college was established in 2004 and is in Chennai.

Departments:

- Anesthesiology and Pain Clinic
- Biochemistry
- Chest & TB
- Casualty (Accident & Emergency Medicine)
- Cardiac Care Center
- Community Medicine
- Dermatology
- ENT & Head Neck Surgery
- Forensic Medicine and Toxicology
- General Medicine
- General Surgery
- Microbiology
- Neurology
- Neuro Surgery
- Obstetrics and Gynaecology
- Ophthalmology
- Orthopaedics
- Paediatrics
- Pathology
- Psychiatry
- Pharmacology
- Radiology & Imaging Sciences
- Surgical Gastroenterology
- Urology & Nephrology

College on the same campus:

- Sree Balaji College of Nursing, Chennai (estd. 2007)

=== Sri Lakshmi Narayana Institute of Medical Sciences & Hospital ===
This college was established in 2007 and is in Puducherry.

Departments:

- Anaesthesiology
- Anatomy
- Biochemistry
- Community Medicine
- Dentistry
- Dermatology
- ENT
- Forensic Medicine
- General Medicine
- General Surgery
- Microbiology
- Obstetrics & Gynaecology
- Ophthalmology
- Orthopaedics
- Paediatrics
- Pathology
- Pharmacology
- Physiology
- Psychiatry
- Radiology
- TB & Chest

College on the same campus:

- Sri Lakshmi Narayana College of Engineering

=== Sree Balaji Dental College and Hospital ===
This college was established in 2002 and is in Chennai.

Departments:

- Oral Medicine & Radiology
- Oral and Maxillofacial Pathology
- Conservative Dentistry and Endodontics
- Periodontics
- Oral and Maxillofacial Surgery
- Orthodontics
- Pedodontics and Preventive Dentistry
- Prosthodontics and Crown & Bridge
- Anatomy
- Pharmacology
- Microbiology
- Bio Chemistry
- General Surgery
- General Medicine
- Physiology
- Community Dentistry
- Oral Pathology

College on the same campus:

- Sree Balaji College of Physiotherapy, Chennai (estd. 2007)

=== Bhaarath Medical College and Hospital ===
Departments:

- Human Anatomy
- Human Physiology
- Bio Chemistry
- Pathology(inc. Blood Bank)
- Microbiology
- Pharmacology
- Forensic Medicine including Toxicology
- Community Medicine
- General Medicine
- Ophthalmology
- Obstetrics & Gynaecology
- Anaesthesiology
- Pediatrics
- Psychiatry
- Dermatology, Venerealogy & Leprosy
- Tuberculosis & Respiratory Diseases
- General Surgery
- Orthopaedics
- Radio-Diagnosis
- Otorhinolaryngology
- Dentistry
- Dental Surgery
- Venereology

=== Bhaarath College of Nursing ===
Courses

- B.Sc. Nursing

== Rankings ==
Institute rankings

General – India
- NIRF (Overall) (2024): 91
- NIRF (Universities) (2024): 73

The National Institutional Ranking Framework (NIRF) has ranked Bharath Institute of Higher Education and Research 91st overall and 73rd among universities in 2024.

== Notable alumni ==
- Naresh Babu - professional motorcycle road racer
- Suruthi Periyasamy - a runway model and actress
- Kanna Ravi - an Indian Tamil actor

== See also ==
- List of deemed universities
- Deemed University
