= Doyle Doss =

- Occupation: Founder of Doss Products
- Known for: Inventor of the Eye to Eye hummingbird feeder

Doyle Doss is an inventor and founder of Doss Products in Eureka, California.

Doss is registered as a sex offender by the California Department of Justice, listed on the official California Megan's Law website.

== Products ==
- Kandle Heeter candle holder
- Eye to Eye hummingbird feeder is a wearable hummingbird feeder. While not wildly popular, it has a niche following and at least 700 have been sold in the United States and Canada.
