= Geeta Madhavan =

Indian lawyer, educator

Geeta Madhavan is a lawyer and professor in Chennai, India. She is the first woman in India to have done her Ph.D. in Law on international terrorism, and is an expert on international terrorism and maritime law. She is a consultant on international law offering her expertise to academic departments that feature international relations programs. She was a founder member of the Centre for Security Analysis, Chennai. She is currently the President of InternationalLaw and Strategic Analysis Institute (ILSAI) in Chennai. Madhavan lives in Chennai.

== Background ==
Madhavan was awarded the Doctoral Scholarship for Advance Research in International Terrorism by The Hague Academy of International Law at The Hague, The Netherlands in 1997 and the only person from Asia for that year. She is visiting faculty at the University of Madras and guest faculty at the Tamil Nadu Dr. Ambedkar Law University, teaching post graduate courses on International Maritime Law and International Law and Nuclear Energy.

She has published numerous articles on international issues like terrorism, maritime laws, extradition, human rights and refugees. She has visited the United States on the invitation of the US State Department to participate in International Group Project on International Security Issues, under the International Visitors Leadership Program. She has attended the Salzburg Seminar, is an RCSS alumnus and has also attended the Wilton Park Conference at Brighton, UK. She is alumnus of Kennedy School of Government, Harvard USA and alumnus of NESA Centre, Washington DC, USA.

Since 2008, she is part of an international Working Group formed by the Strategic Studies Network which is an initiative of the National Defense University, Washington, D.C. and has been producing policy papers on several subjects including counter-terrorism, Afghanistan policies, extremism, maritime issues, piracy etc. and on other related strategic issues. She writes for international journals, national newspapers and several of her articles on regional strategic issues have appeared in foreign journals and newspapers.

Madhavan has made numerous media appearances and has been interviewed extensively in leading English daily newspapers, vernacular newspapers and magazines and popular web magazines and all leading TV channels. Her articles are available on popular websites on regional strategic issues. She has published books as well as papers in several books on strategic and legal matters. She is a blogger and her articles can be read therein. She has presented papers and been on the panel in numerous national and international conferences.

Geeta is a practicing Advocate of the Madras High Court and is partner of the legal firm Madhavan & Associates. She is a Founder Member of the Chennai-based think tank Centre for Security Analysis. She is President of the International Law and Strategic Analysis Institute (ILSAI) in Chennai.

== Publications ==
- The International Criminal Court : proceedings of a dialogue in India, 2006
- SONGS OF THE CRYSTAL BIRD, 2018
