= Vallam Sundar =

Indian coastal engineer (born 1953)

- Born: 30 March 1953 (age 73); Chennai, India
- Scientific career
- Fields: Coastal Engineering
- Workplaces: Indian Institute of Technology Madras
- Notable students: S.A. Sannasiraj, Sriram Venkatachalam

Vallam Sundar (born 30 March 1953) is an Indian professor of Coastal Engineering at the Department of Ocean Engineering of Indian Institute of Technology Madras (IIT Madras), Chennai, India.

== Biography ==
=== Education and career ===
Vallam Sundar studied Civil engineering at the College of Engineering, Guindy, where he graduated in 1975. He completed his post-graduation in Hydraulics from IIT Madras in 1977 and received his doctorate in 1982 from the same institute.

Sundar started working at Anna University as Associate Lecturer. In 1981 he became a Scientific Officer at the Ocean Engineering Centre at IIT Madras and worked till 1987. In 1987 he became Assistant Professor of Coastal, Port and Harbour Engineering in the Ocean Engineering Centre at IIT Madras. During 2003–06, he served as the Head of Department of Ocean Engineering (IITM).

=== Current academic positions ===
Since 1996, Sundar is a professor of Coastal Engineering at Dept. of Ocean Engineering, IIT Madras

=== Memberships ===
- Member, "The Institution of Engineers", Madras
- Member, "International Association of Hydraulic Research", The Netherlands
- Member, "Maritime Hydraulic Section of I.A.H.R.", The Netherlands
- Member, "The American Society of Marine Engineering", New York, USA
- Member, "American Society Of Mechanical Engineers", New York, USA
- Member, "American Society Of Civil Engineers", USA
- Member, European Union for Coastal Conservation
- Member, "Executive committee of Asia Pacific Division of International Association of Hydraulic Research", The Netherlands for 2003-2004
- Member, The Royal Institute of Naval Architects, London, U.K.
