= C. P. Johnstone =

English cricketer

Personal information
- Full name: Conrad Powell Johnstone
- Born: 19 August 1895; Sydenham, London
- Died: 23 June 1974 (aged 78); Eastry, Kent
- Batting: Left-handed
- Bowling: Right-arm medium

Domestic team information
- Years: Team
- 1919–1920: Cambridge University
- 1919–1933: Kent
- 1925/26–1947/48: Europeans (India)
- 1926/27–1944/45: Madras
- 1929–1939: Marylebone Cricket Club
- FC debut: 21 May 1919 Cambridge Univ. v Australian Imperial Forces
- Last FC: 11 January 1948 Europeans v Indians

Career statistics
Competition	First-class
Matches	110
Runs scored	5,482
Batting average	30.62
100s/50s	6/29
Top score	135
Balls bowled	6,435
Wickets	103
Bowling average	27.43
5 wickets in innings	3
10 wickets in match	0
Best bowling	6/28
Catches/stumpings	42
- Source: ESPNcricinfo, 23 February 2018

Conrad Powell Johnstone CBE (19 August 1895 – 23 June 1974), known as CP Johnstone or Con Johnstone, was an English businessman and amateur sportsman who played first-class cricket between 1919 and 1948. After serving in the First World War he spent much his working life in India and is regarded as one of the key players in the development of cricket in Madras. He served in the First World War, played first-class cricket in both England and India and was also a noted golfer as well as the President of Kent County Cricket Club in later life.

== Early life ==
Johnstone was born at Sydenham in south-east London, the son of William and Katherine Johnstone. His father was a "Gentlemen of independent means" and Johnstone was educated at Hartford House school before going to Rugby School where he played cricket in the school team in 1912 and 1913. He captained Rugby in his final year and also represented the school in the racquet pairs. He played three times for the Kent County Cricket Club Second XI in the Minor Counties Championship in July 1914 and was admitted to Pembroke College, Cambridge in 1914 but his education was interrupted by the outbreak of war in Europe.

== War service ==
Johnstone volunteered for military service in August 1914 soon after the outbreak of World War I. He was commissioned into the 3rd Battalion, Highland Light Infantry (HLI) as a 2nd Lieutenant. His uncle was serving in the same battalion. Johnstone completed his training at the battalion's depot at Portsmouth before being appointed as a temporary lieutenant in February 1915 and being posted to France the following month, attached to 1st Battalion, HLI, part of the Sirhind Brigade in the 3rd (Lahore) Division.

His battalion saw action at Second Ypres later in 1915, and Johnstone was wounded in the neck on 1 May, breaking two ribs and puncturing a lung. He spent the next 15 months recovering from the wounds before being posted back to the HLI in August 1916. A commission in the Regular Army followed and Johnstone was posted to the 17th Battalion, Lancashire Fusiliers at Arras in November, seeing action in the Somme in 1917. He was wounded again in October that year, this time by shell fire. After more recuperation he was passed fit for home service and took up a position as an instructor with the 6th Officer Cadet Battalion at Oxford for the remainder of the war.

== Professional life, cricket and India ==
After resigning his Army commission in May 1919, Johnstone returned to Pembroke College, Cambridge, studying for a law degree. He graduated in 1920 having been credited with four terms study due to his war service. He played cricket for the University team, making his first-class cricket debut for the team in May 1919 against the Australian Imperial Forces at Fenner's. He won a Blue in both cricket and golf, captaining the Cambridge team to an unexpected victory in the university golf match, and made his Kent First XI debut in 1919 against Hampshire.

After graduating Johnstone was employed by a liquor manufacturer in Calcutta and then for a number of years by Burmah Shell in Madras as a manager. He spent the 1925 summer in England, played 12 times during the season for Kent and was awarded his county cap. Further appearances for the county followed in 1929, but the majority of his cricket was played in India playing particularly for the Europeans and for Madras Cricket Club. He captained Madras in the inaugural Ranji Trophy in 1934 was captain in 1940/41 when the team were runners-up in the competition, losing to Bombay in the final, and played regularly in Madras Presidency Matches from 1925/26 to 1947/48, captaining the Europeans team for much of the period. When Madras entered the Madras League for the first time in 1939 Johnstone was the captain and a key player on the team and captained the Madras team throughout the period. Johnstone played both against Marylebone Cricket Club when it toured Madras in 1926/27 and for the club in five matches as well as for other teams on occasion. He remained in the Reserve of Officers until 1937.

Johnstone is credited as a significant factor in the development of cricket in Madras. He has been described as having played a "pioneering role" in the growth of the sport who was able to provide talented young players with employment in Burmah Shell, providing them with the opportunity to play cricket with a stable income behind them. Players such as M. J. Gopalan, who became a double Indian international in both cricket and hockey, benefited in this way. Johnstone was President of Madras Cricket Club in 1947 towards the end of his playing career. As a player he was described as "an excellent all-round cricketer", who batted left-handed, often opening the batting, bowled right-arm medium pace and was an "excellent" and "brilliant" slip fielder. Australian international Keith Miller described how a particular catch taken by Johnstone, then aged 50, in a match at Madras in 1945 was "the best catch that ever dismissed me". As a captain he was described as an "astute leader of men" and as an administrator he was involved in setting up the Board of Control for Cricket in India as well as playing an important role in "cementing European-Indian relations", particularly when the exclusive Madras Cricket Club, which had been largely controlled by Europeans, became the democratic Madras Cricket Association. The cricket pavilion at the M. A. Chidambaram Stadium was named after him in 1997.

As well as his involvement with cricket, Johnstone was Chairman of the Madras Chamber of Commerce and was involved in organisations such as the Madras Club and the Indian Roads and Transport Development Association. He was appointed a CBE in the 1948 New Year Honours for services to cricket in Madras.

== Later life ==
Johnstone returned to England in 1948. He was a member of the General Committee at Kent, particularly involved with the development of young players, and was President of the club in 1967, the year the county won the Gillette Cup for the first time. He died at his home at Eastry in Kent in June 1974, aged 78, after watching India play England in a Test match at Lord's.
