= Naresh Babu =

Indian road racer

Naresh Babu J.
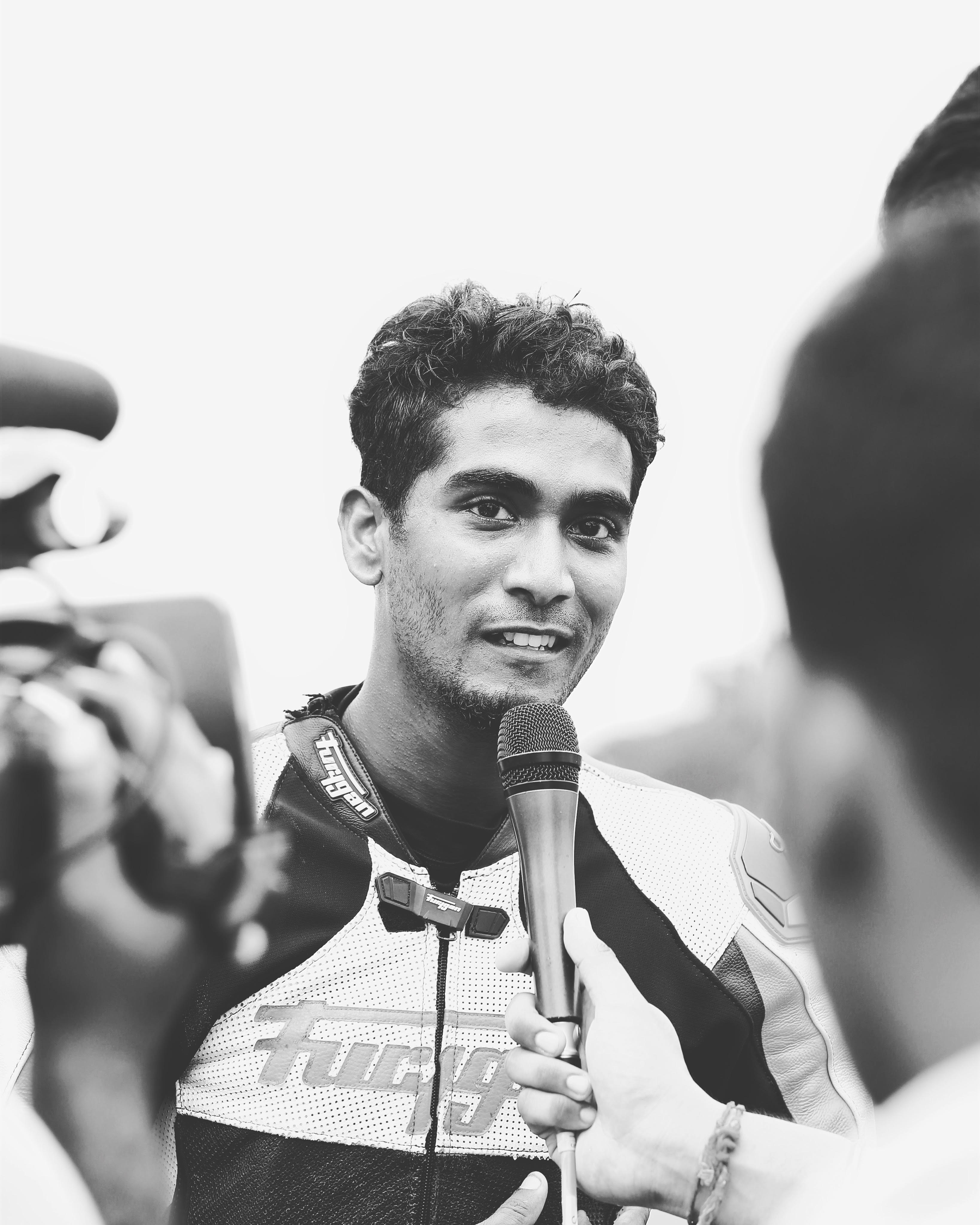
- Nationality: (India) Indian
- Born: 22 August 1991 (age 35); Chennai, Tamil Nadu, India
- Current team: RACR - Rajini Academy of Competitive Racing

Naresh Babu J. (born 22 August 1991) is a professional motorcycle road racer and a National champion in the 165cc class. In 2014, he became the first rider to win 4 championship titles in a single season. He took part in Honda One Make CBR250cc Expert category in Indian National racing championship in 2015.

Naresh Babu is currently seeking his next National Championship title in Pro-Stock category which is the most competitive category in Indian National motorcycle racing championship. He has won many back-to-back podium races on a Kawasaki Ninja ZX-10R in "Superbikes Upto 1000cc", which is the fastest class in India.

During the last round of the superbikes, Naresh spends his weekend right and sped all the way to the top of the qualifying list with 2 seconds ahead of other competitors. Starting from pole Naresh took his first "win" on the premium segment forcefully with his Kawasaki Ninja ZX-10R and ends 2016's season with success.

== Education ==
Naresh completed his Diploma in Electronic Communication Engineering through Bharath University in 2012.

== Career ==
Naresh started racing as a privateer on a Yamaha YZF-R15 in the "Yamaha One make Novice class" at the last round of FMSCI MMSC National Motorcycle Racing championship 2010. He continued to race as a privateer on Yamaha YBX in Stock 130cc National Championship in 2012. In 2013, Naresh competed with a Yamaha YZF-R15 in the stock up to 165cc National Championship. In 2016 he made his debut in the Supersport 1000cc which is India's most premium category. His goal was to get on the International platform of racing right from the start of his career.

Naresh was also working as Race Official for many JK Tyre National Racing championships, JK Tyre Karting National championships and much more. He was also working as a Manager for Car racing team which made him spend all his time on Motorsports in 2016.

In 2017, Naresh Joins RACR - Rajini Academy of Competitive Racing as a Rider to take part in the Indian National Motorcycle Championships and also International Championships. He will also be working as an Instructor for RACR's Sport Biking School.

== Achievements ==
In 2013, Naresh was selected one among top 10 in the Indian Motorcycle League where more than 150 riders throughout the country took part, In the same championship he finished 3rd in stock up to 165cc 1 hour Endurance Race. He made his first step on the podium during the 5th round of FMSCI MMSC Indian National Motorcycle Racing Championship 2013. In 2014 he won as many races as he could and won the "Honda National Champion" title for the year and also "Silver Stock upto 165cc National Champion", "Silver TVS Apache One make National Champion" & "Bronze Yamaha One make National Champion" titles respectively making him the first person to win 4 championship titles in a single season. he was also backed by Honda Motorcycle and Scooter India and also the first rider to win a race in the Stock 165cc National championship with a Honda where Yamaha was the dominating manufacturer in this category. In 2015, Naresh Joins United Tech Torque Racing and competed in the Honda CBR 250 Open Class, Later he was promoted to the Pro-Stock 165cc class in National Championship 2016.

Based on his performance in the National Championships, UTTR offered a sponsored ride Supersport 1000cc Support in the FMSCI MMSC INMRC 2016 and wins the race ahead of his competitors.
