= PK Arumugam =

Rubik's Cube speed solver

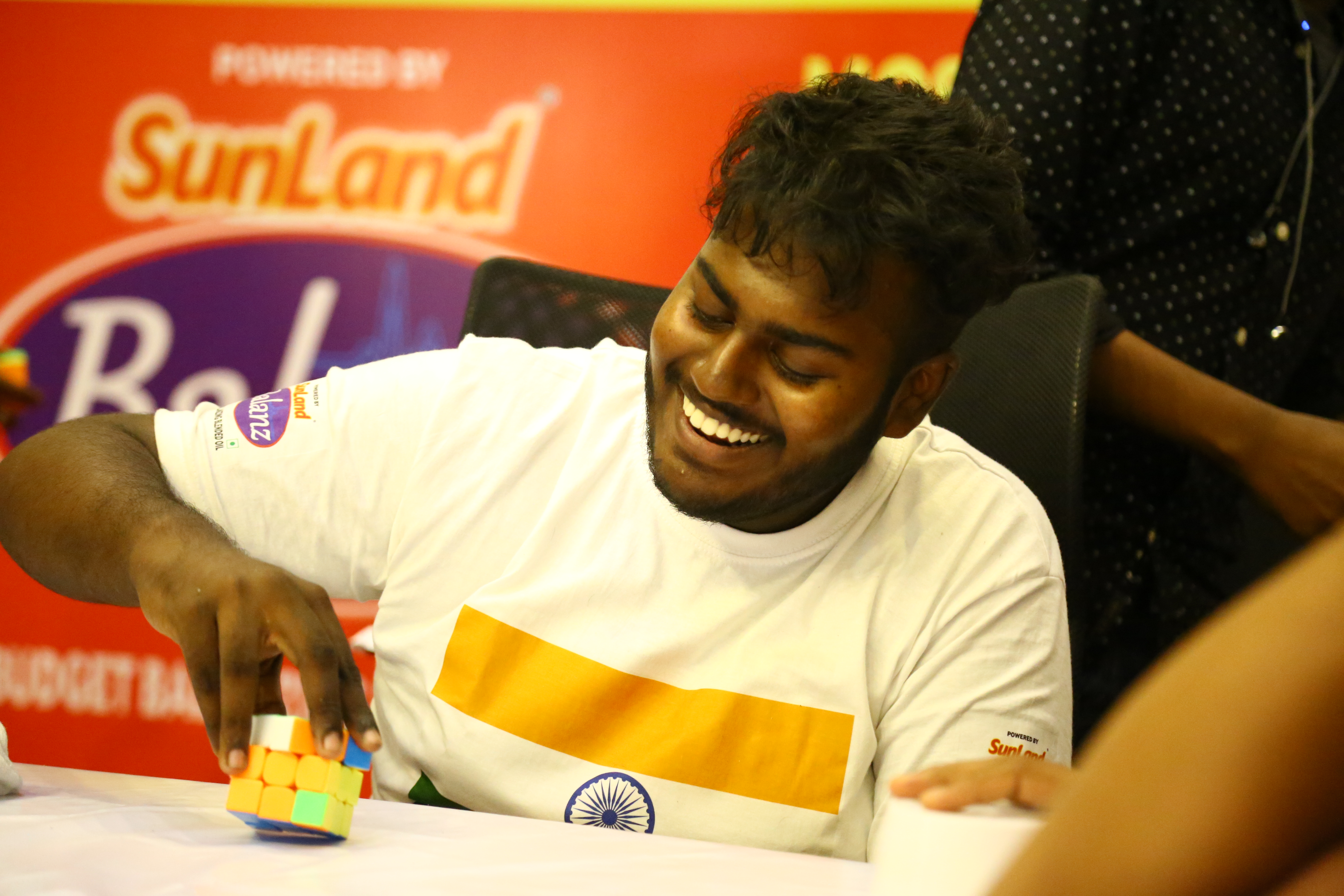
- Born: 6 December 1999 (age 26); Chennai, India
- Education: Kendriya Vidyalaya IIT Chennai
- Years active: 2013 – present
- Known for: Rubik's Cube speed solving

Arumugam PK or PK Arumugam (born 6 December 1999) is an accomplished Indian Speedcuber. He is a three-time world record holder and the first person to solve more than 1000 Rubik's cubes while riding a bicycle.

He started SpeedCubing in June 2013 and found out about the World Cube Association (WCA) in December that year. He learnt the CFOP method of solving the Rubik's Cube and took part in his first WCA competition, the Shaastra Cube Open in January 2014, solving five cubes in an average time of 36.51 seconds, with his best single solve taking 27.78 seconds.

In 2015 The Indian Nationals took place in Chennai for the first time and this is where Arumugam met Bhargav Narasimhan, a multiple national record holder and holder of the Guinness World Record for the fastest time to solve five Rubik's cubes one-handed.

== World Records ==
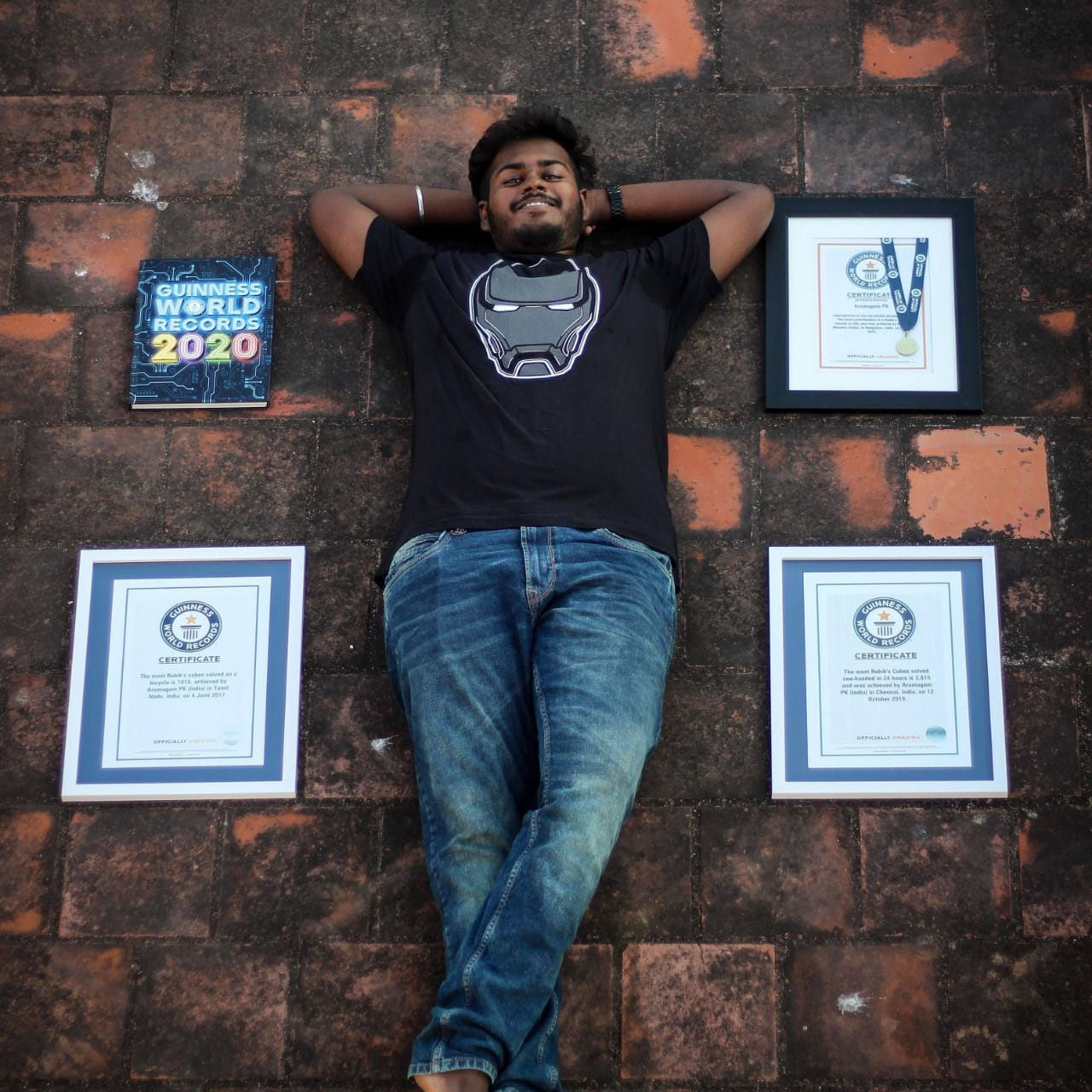
Arumugam with his Guinness World Records

On 4 June 2017, after several months' practice, Arumugam set his first world record by solving 1,010 Rubik's Cubes while riding a bicycle for 6 hours 7 minutes and 4 seconds without resting his legs on the floor, beating the former record of 751 Rubik's Cubes held by Shreevatsh Rajkumar.

On 5 May 2019 at Gopalan Innovation Mall in Bangalore, Arumugam was a part of the team consisting of 293 people who created a portrait of a tiger, consisting of 1200 Rubik's Cubes in support of tiger conservation in India. This attempt was listed in Guinness World Records as most contributions to a Rubik's Cube mosaic.

On 12 October 2019 Arumugam set his third Guinness World Record at Chennai Citi Centre, Dr Radha Krishnan Salai by solving 2815 Rubik's Cubes one-handed in 24 hours, beating the former record of 2,176 held by Krishnam Raju Gadiraju.

== Other awards ==
On 25 June 2017 at VGP Chennai, he was awarded with Young Achiever's Record conducted by India events and sports.

== Personal life ==
Arumugam PK was born on 6 December 1999 in Chennai, Tamil Nadu. He has an younger sister. He attended Sri Sankara Senior Secondary School in Adayar and graduated from Kendriya Vidyalaya IIT Chennai in 2017. He is currently studying electronic and instrumentation engineering at the SRM Institute of Science and Technology.
