= Nugent Grant =

Nugent Grant was a notable Madras lawyer of British origin who served in the Madras High Court. He served as the Public Prosecutor for the government and was the President of the Madras Bar Association in 1929. Nugent Grant was the chief prosecuting attorney in the famous 1924 Imperial Bank Case which was tried in the High Court of Judicature at Madras, tried before Mr Justice Beasley.
