= Ravivarman Sharmila =

Indian carrom champion from Tamil Nadu

R. Sharmila
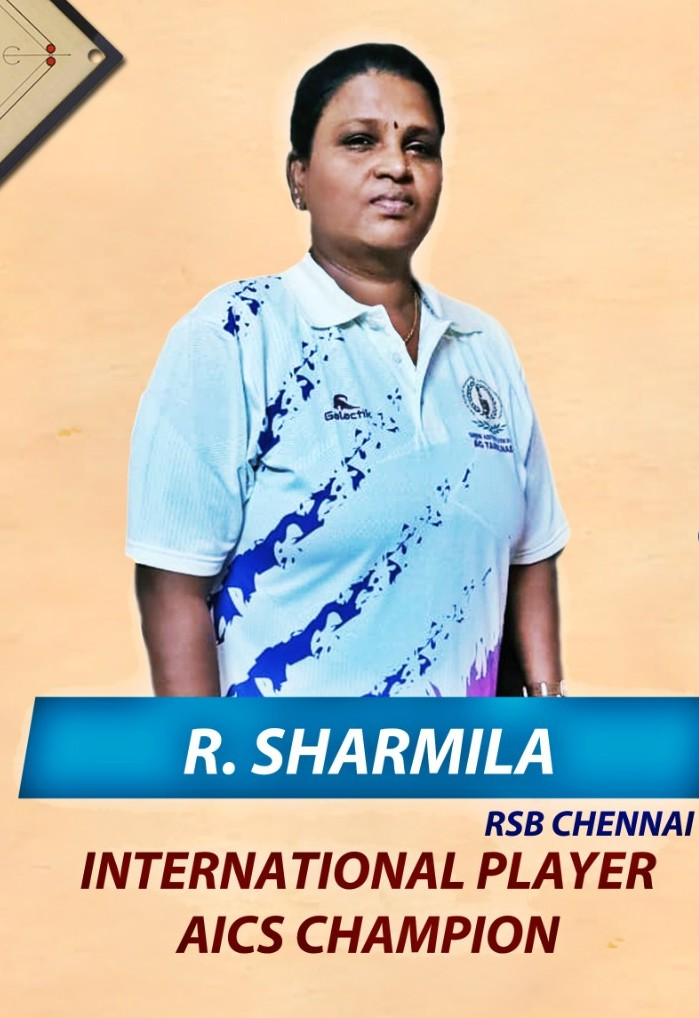
- R. Sharmila, International Carrom Player and AICS Champion

Personal information
- Full name: Ravivarman Sharmila
- Nationality: Indian
- Born: 23 April 1981 (age 45) Chennai, Tamil Nadu, India

Sport
- Sport: Carrom
- Club: Office of the Accountant General (Audit), Chennai (AGORC); RSB Chennai
- Turned pro: 1992
- Updated on March 2026

Ravivarman Sharmila, widely known as R. Sharmila, is an Indian carrom champion from Chennai, Tamil Nadu. One of the most decorated women carrom players in Indian history, she has won multiple Senior National Championships, Federation Cup titles, and represented India at the international level including the SAARC Carrom Championship and the World Carrom Championship. She is a Central Government employee working at the Office of the Accountant General (Audit), Chennai (AGORC), under the Comptroller and Auditor General of India (CAG).

== Early life and introduction to carrom ==
Sharmila was born on 23 April 1981 into a lower-income family in Chennai. She began playing carrom at the age of 8, largely inspired by and under the guidance of her elder sister, R. Saritha, who was herself a competitive carrom player. The two sisters trained together, and Saritha's influence proved decisive in Sharmila's early development of the game.

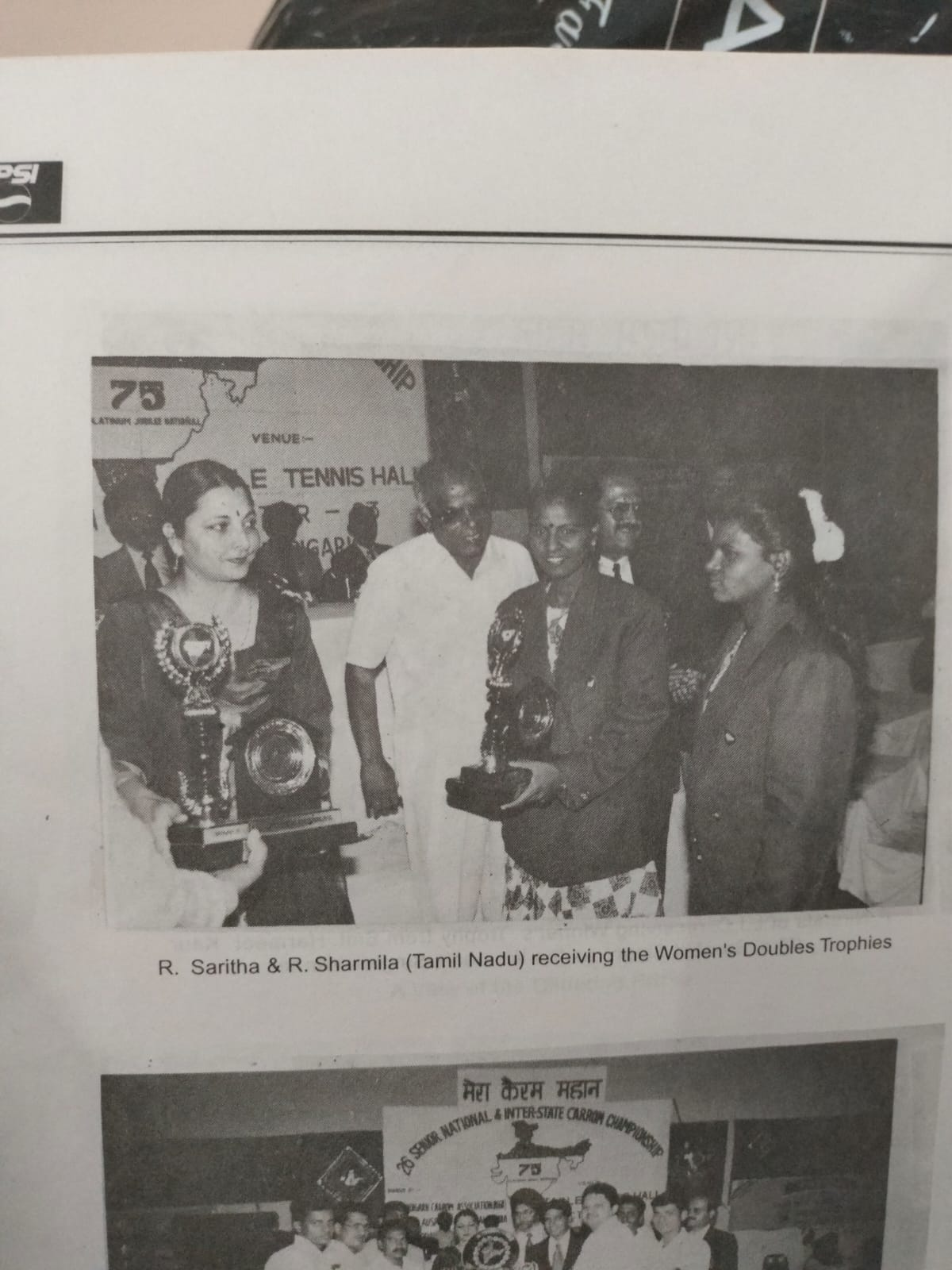
R. Saritha and R. Sharmila (Tamil Nadu) receiving the Women's Doubles Trophies at a National Championship.

Sharmila started playing professionally from around age 10. Following in her sister's footsteps, she trained for seven years before rising to national prominence. She was selected for the Tamil Nadu Sub-Junior Carrom Team in 1992 at the age of 11.

== Career ==
=== Sub-Junior and Junior years (1992–1997) ===
Sharmila's competitive career began at the sub-junior level, where she quickly distinguished herself. She won the Women's Doubles title at the 19th Sub-Junior National Carrom Championship in 1993 (paired with R. Saritha), and followed that with the Women's Singles title at the 21st Sub-Junior National in 1995, held in New Delhi. She also represented Tamil Nadu in inter-state competitions during this period, recording notable victories at the state and zonal levels.

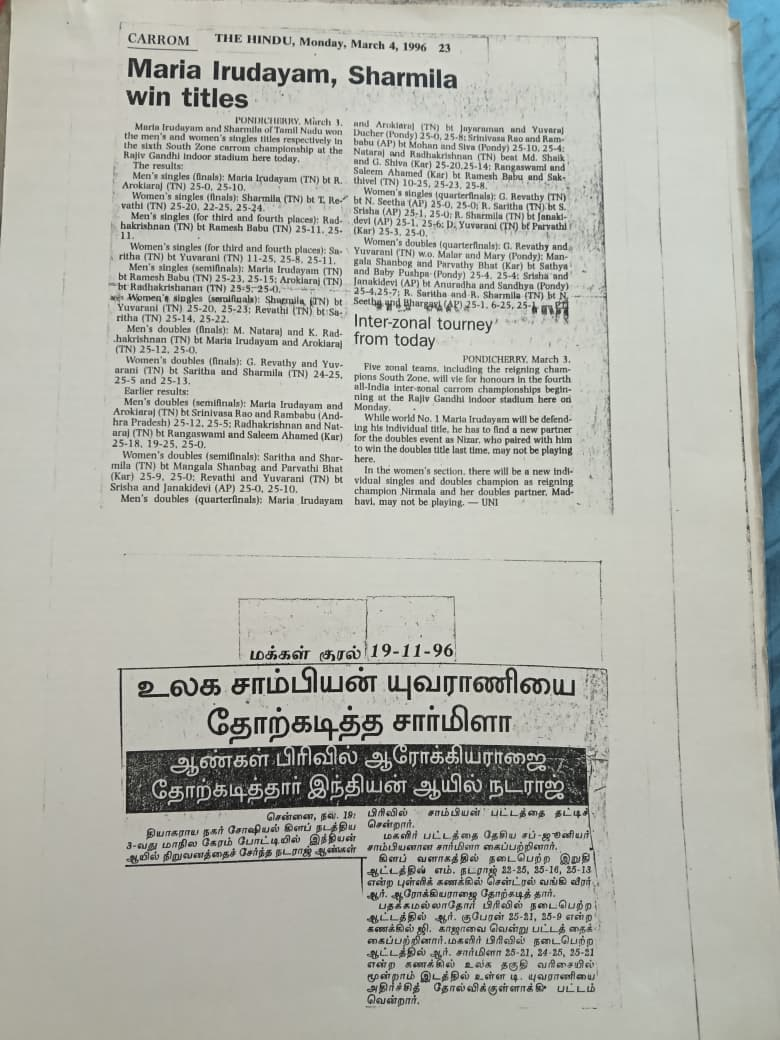
The Hindu, 4 March 1996 — earliest newspaper mention of R. Sharmila in senior competition.

By 1996, Sharmila was already competing in senior inter-state tournaments. A The Hindu report from March 1996 noted her as part of the competitive Tamil Nadu circuit, with results at Pondicherry featuring alongside established players. A News Today report from November 1996 documented her wins in the Women's Singles and Doubles categories at national-level meets in Chennai, confirming her rise into senior competition.

=== Senior National dominance (1998–2000) ===
Sharmila became the youngest winner of the Senior National Carrom Championship when she claimed the title in 1998, defeating then-national champion D. Yovement in the semi-finals and going on to win the title. A The Hindu report from January 1998 confirmed her win at the 50th Senior National Carrom Championship in Chennai, where she defeated Anuraju in the final, winning the Women's Singles title in straight sets. She retained the title in 1999 and again in 2000, making her a three-time consecutive Senior National Champion.

At the 29th Senior National Carrom Championship held in Hyderabad in March 2000, Sharmila claimed both the Women's Singles and Women's Doubles titles. In the singles final, she defeated D. Swarnalatha (Tamil Nadu) 25-14, 25-11. In the doubles, she partnered with D. Swarnalatha to win the title. This achievement — winning both the singles and doubles at the same Nationals — was noted as a historic feat. A The Hindu report from 7 March 2000 described her as only the second woman player to achieve this double at the Nationals.

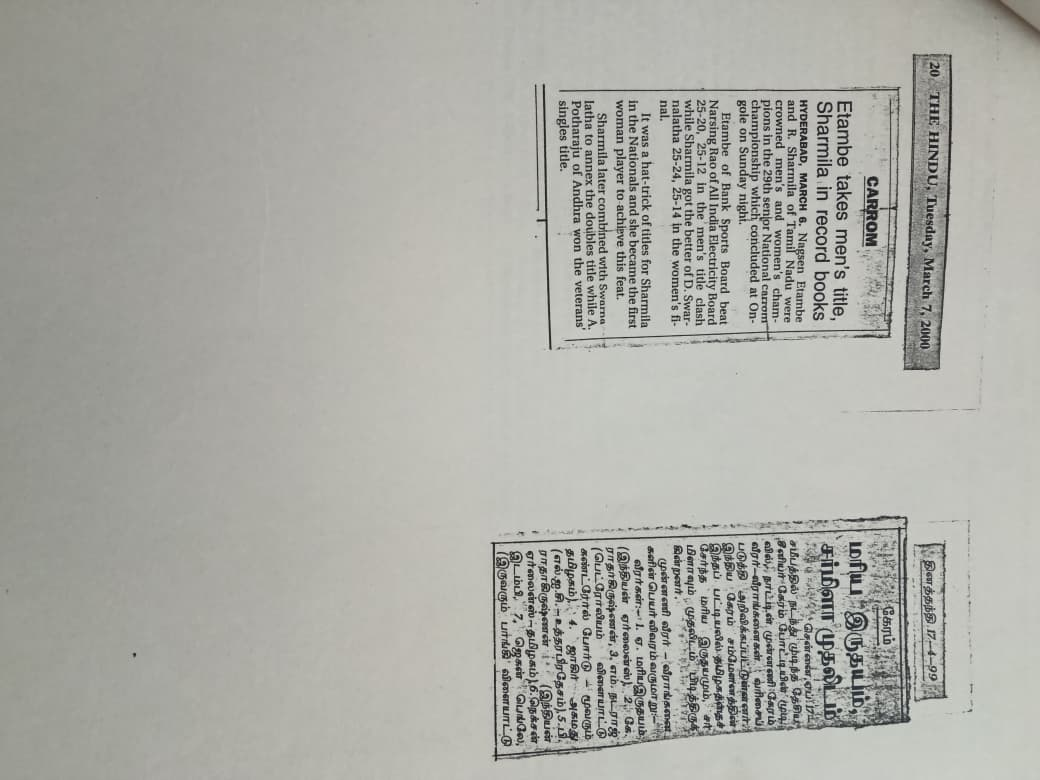
The Hindu, 7 March 2000 — R. Sharmila wins both Singles and Doubles at the 29th Senior National Carrom Championship, Hyderabad.

=== Rankings ===
At her peak, Sharmila dominated the national and international carrom rankings:

- India National Ranking 1999–2000: Ranked 1st in Women's Singles (source: Carrom Courier)
- World Ranking 2000: Ranked 3rd in Women's Singles at the International Carrom Federation world rankings
- Tamil Nadu State Ranking 1999–2000: Ranked 1st in Women's
- Chennai District Ranking 1999–2000: Ranked 1st in Women's

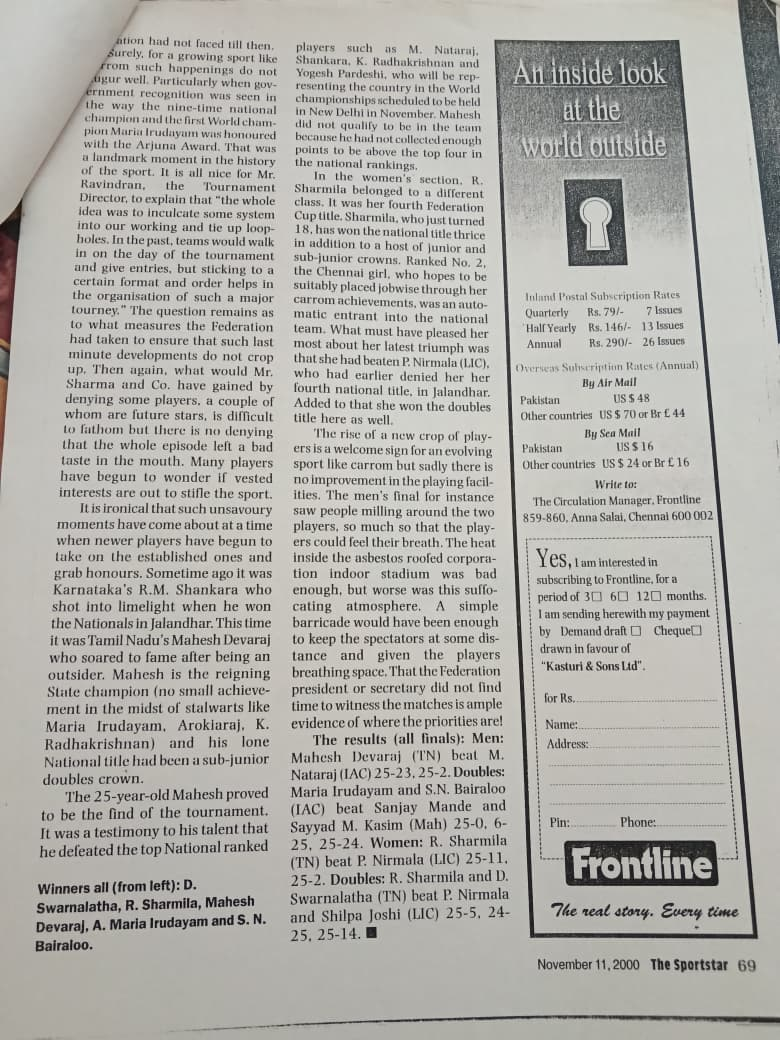
Carrom Courier 1999–2000 showing R. Sharmila as India No. 1 and World No. 3 in Women's carrom.

=== Federation Cup ===
Sharmila won multiple Federation Cup titles. She claimed her fourth Federation Cup Singles title at the XLIII Federation Cup held in New Delhi in October 2000, defeating P. Nirmala (LIC) 25–11, 25–2 in the Women's Singles final. She also won the Women's Doubles title at the same tournament, partnering with D. Swarnalatha (TN), who beat P. Nirmala and Shilpa Joshi (LIC) 25–5, 24–25, 25–14. The Sportstar magazine (November 11, 2000) covered the event under the headline "Mahesh, Sharmila triumph," noting that at just 19 years of age, Sharmila had already won the national title thrice and captured her fourth Federation Cup crown.

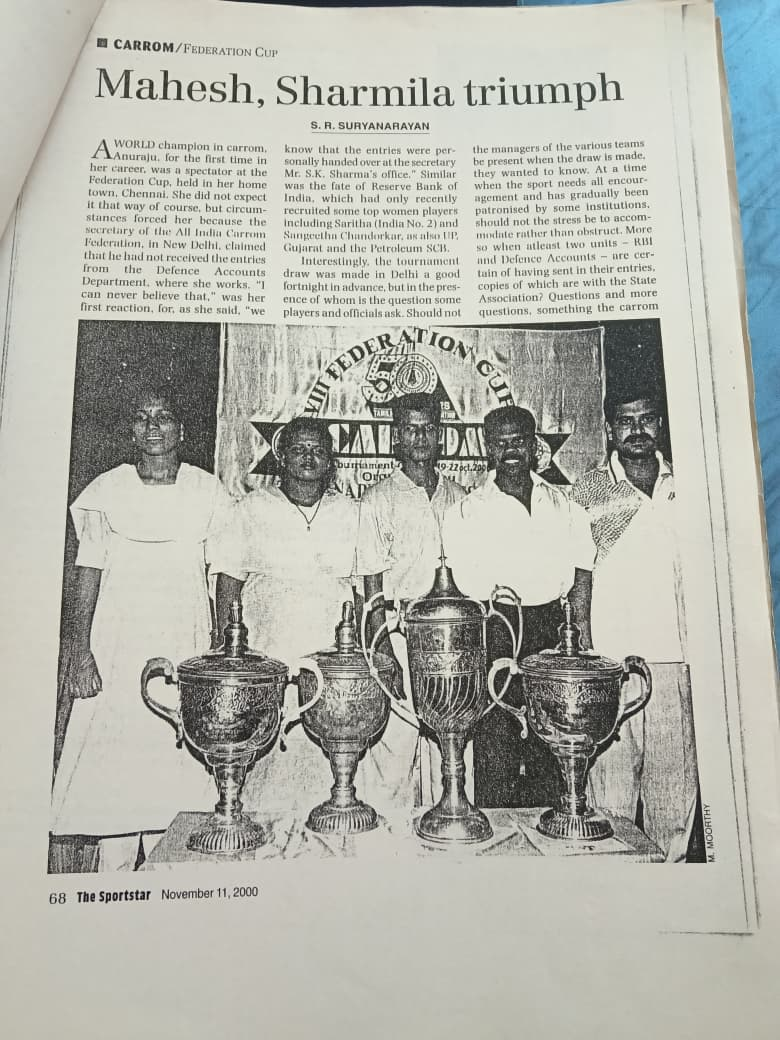
The Sportstar, 11 November 2000 — "Mahesh, Sharmila triumph" covering the XLIII Federation Cup, New Delhi.

=== International career ===
==== Indo-Sri Lanka Test Series, 1998 ====
Sharmila was selected for the Indian Carrom Team for the Test Series held between 8–15 August 1998. India won the series 3–0 against Sri Lanka.

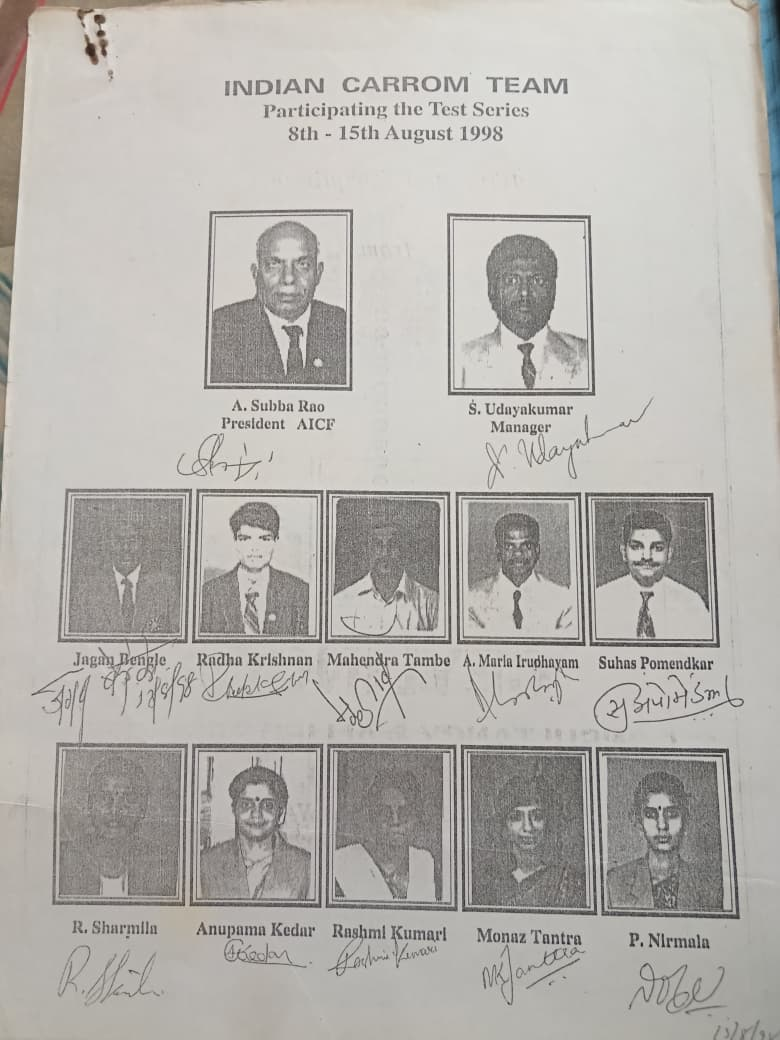
Official team sheet of the Indian Carrom Team, Test Series, 8–15 August 1998. R. Sharmila is in the bottom row, first from left.

==== 3rd World Carrom Championship, 2000 ====
Sharmila was a member of the Indian Women's Team at the 3rd World Carrom Championship held at the NDMC Indoor Stadium, New Delhi, in November 2000. India retained the Women's Team title with a 3–0 win in the final, defeating Sri Lanka. Sharmila was part of a squad that included P. Nirmala (captain), Rashmi Kumari, and Poonarasi. A The Hindu report from 8 November 2000 noted India's dominance in the women's event across the preliminary round-robin stage.

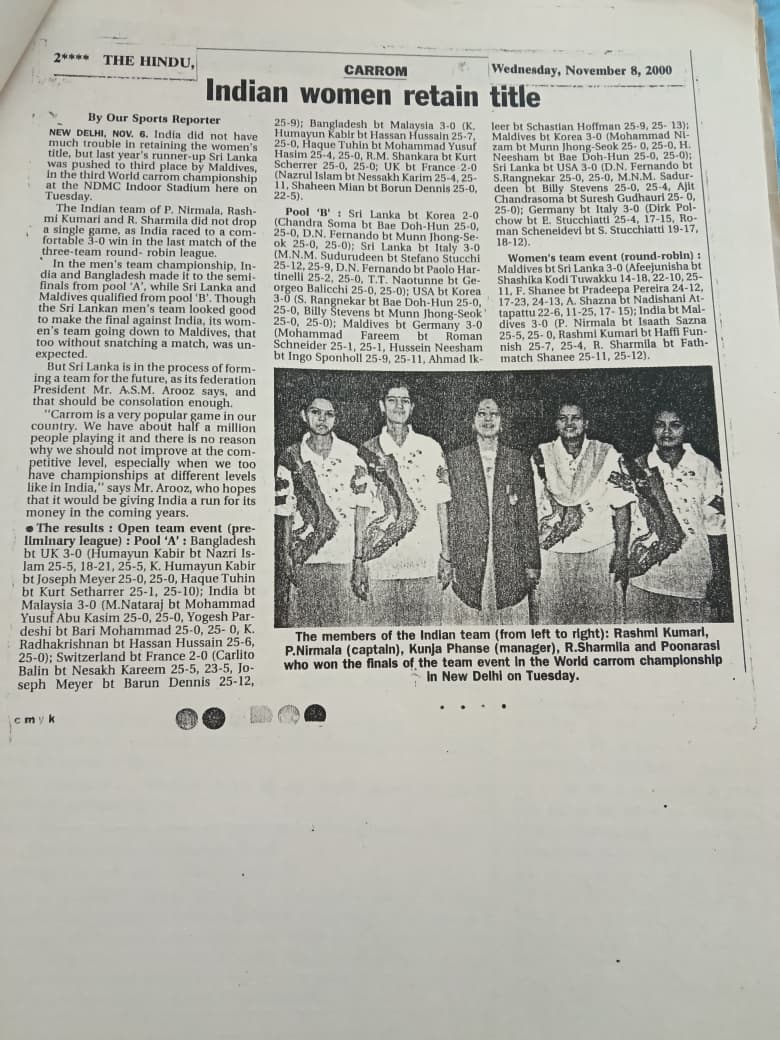
The Hindu, 8 November 2000 — India retains the Women's title at the 3rd World Carrom Championship, New Delhi.

==== SAARC Carrom Championship, 2000 ====
Sharmila won the SAARC Championship in 2000, as reported in the New Indian Express (September 2000). India's women's team topped the event, with Sharmila winning the Women's Singles title. A Tamil-language sports magazine, Vilayattu Ulagam (September 2000), documented India's clean sweep across multiple categories at the SAARC tournament held in the Maldives.

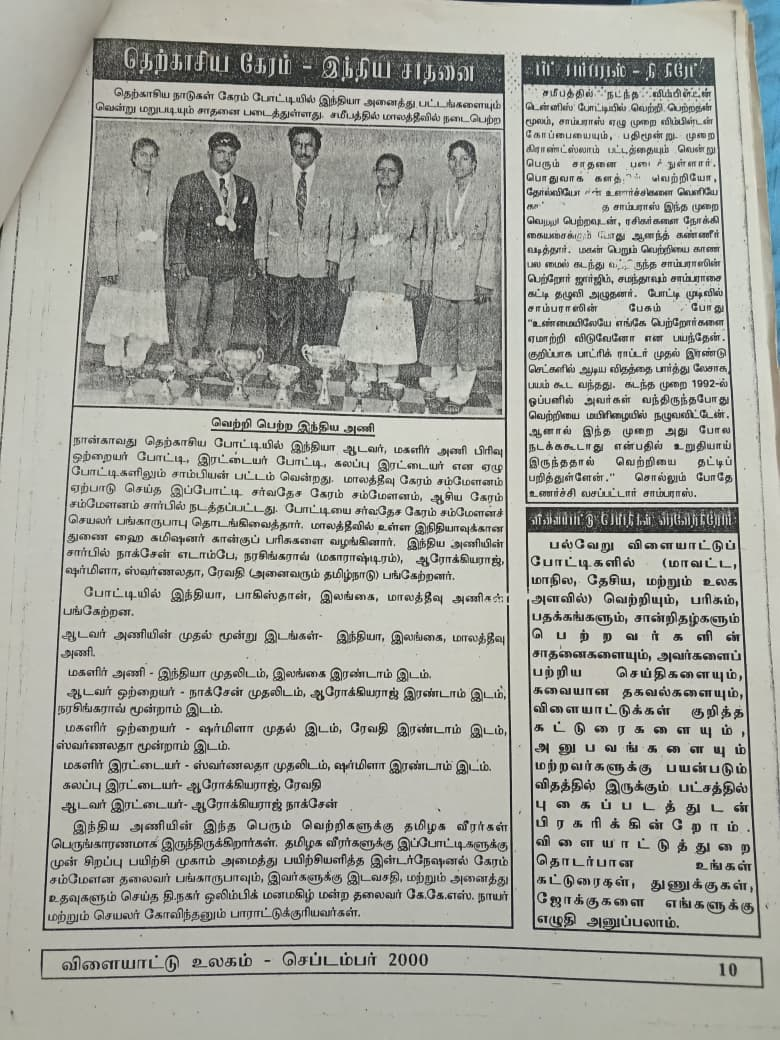
Vilayattu Ulagam, September 2000 — India's achievements at the SAARC Carrom Championship, Maldives.

==== 7th Federation Cup (International), 1999 ====
Sharmila won the Women's Singles title at the 7th Federation Cup international carrom tournament held in Thiruvananthapuram in October 1999, as reported by The Hindu. She defeated Anupama Kedar (BSB) in the final.

== Honours and recognition ==
In February 2002, Sharmila was felicitated by then Chief Minister of Tamil Nadu, J. Jayalalithaa, who presented her with a cash award of ₹25,000 in recognition of her achievements as a young national carrom champion representing Tamil Nadu. The event was covered by Tamil newspapers including Dinamani.

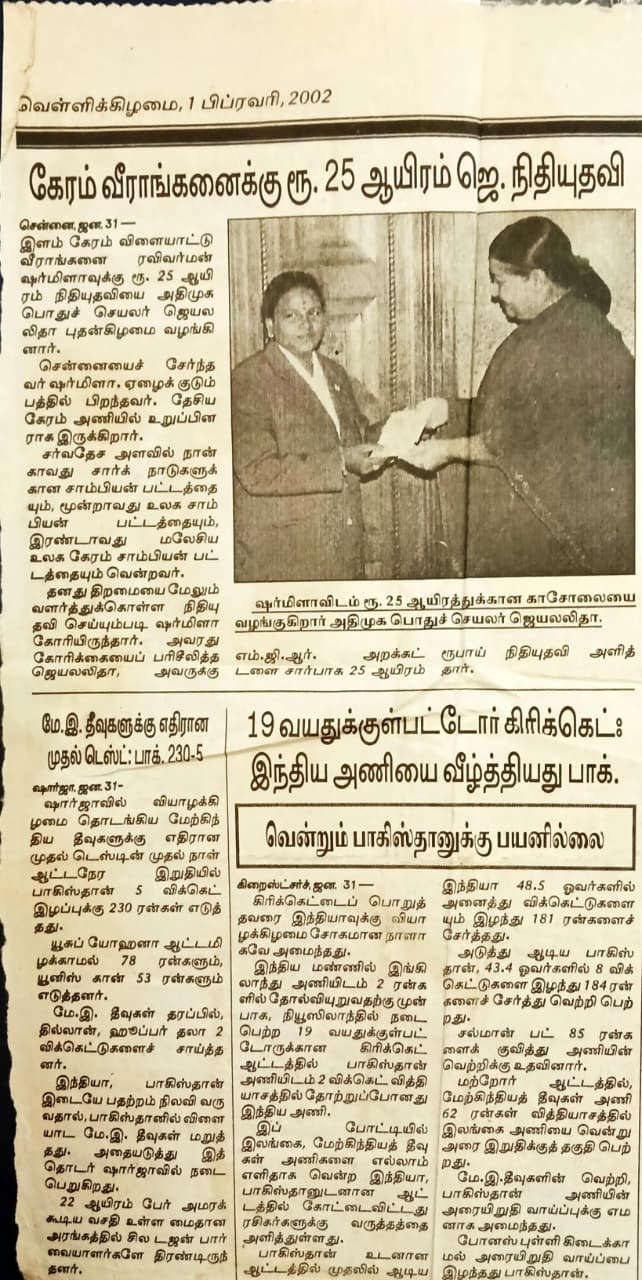
R. Sharmila receiving ₹25,000 cash award from Chief Minister J. Jayalalithaa, February 2002.

She was previously felicitated at a function in Chennai organised by the Olympic Recreation Club, attended by dignitaries including B. Bangaru Babu (Secretary General, International Carrom Federation), A. Maria Irudayam (Arjuna Award recipient), and N. Sharmila (youngest national women's champion). A report in News Today (7 May 1998) documented the ceremony.

== Later career and continued participation ==
Sharmila has continued competing in carrom at the national level into the 2020s. She represented RSB Chennai at the All India Public Sector Sports Control Board (AIPSSB) Carrom Tournament 2024–25 held in New Delhi, where she and her partner were runners-up in the Women's Team Championship. She also participated in the 9th Annual Carrom Tournament 2024, receiving a trophy at the prize distribution ceremony.

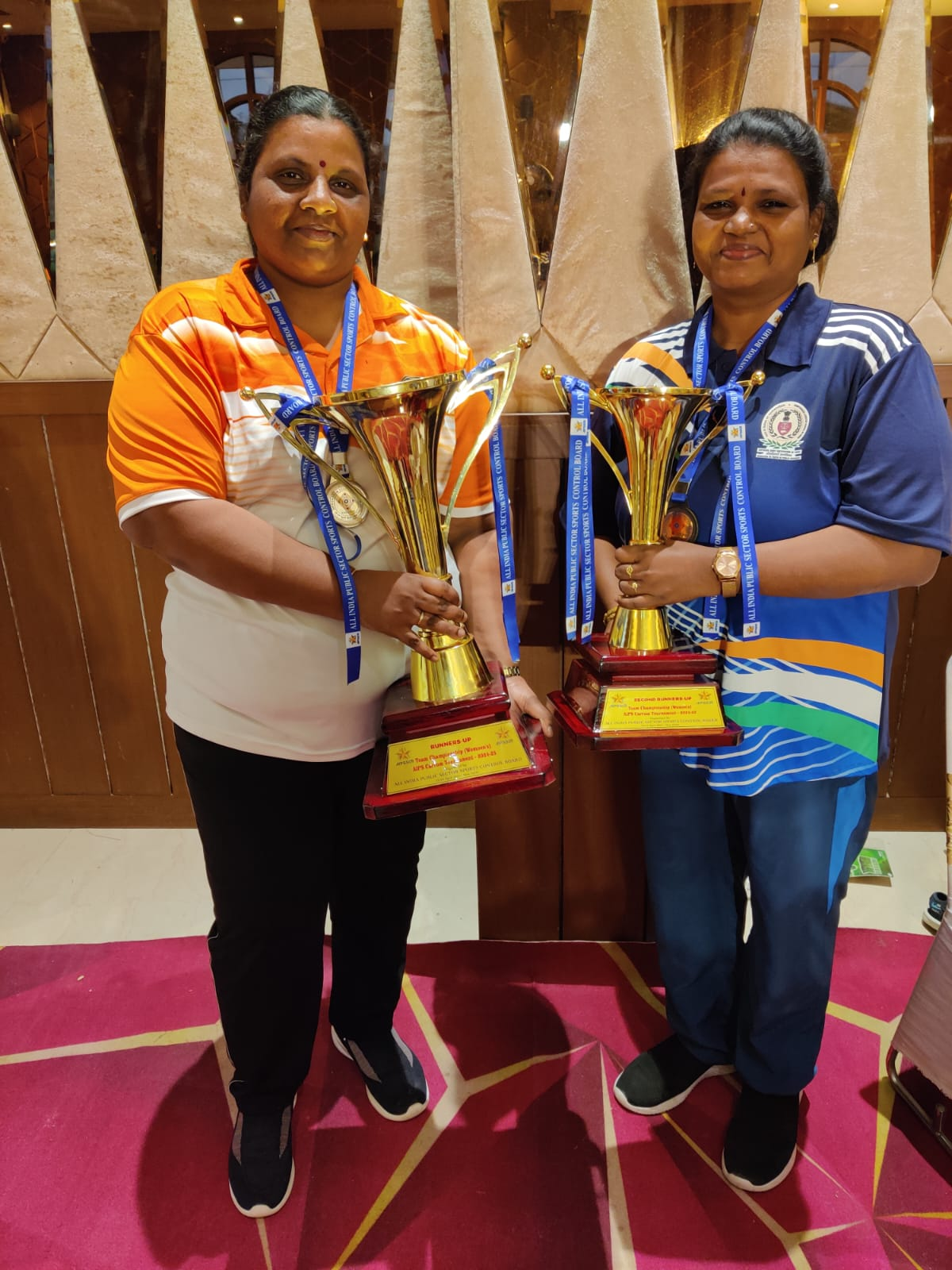
R. Sharmila with the Runners-Up trophy at the AIPSSB Women's Team Championship 2024–25, New Delhi.

In the 2025–26 season, Sharmila was named as an International Player and AICS (All India Civil Services) Carrom Champion, representing RSB Chennai at the All India Civil Services Carrom Tournament 2025–26 organised by the Central Civil Services Cultural & Sports Board (DoPT, Govt. of India), held at Thyagraj Sports Complex, INA, New Delhi.

== Employment ==
Sharmila is employed with the Office of the Accountant General (Audit), Chennai (commonly known as AGORC), a Central Government office functioning under the Comptroller and Auditor General of India (CAG). She represents her department in carrom competitions at the national level under the RSB (Regional Sports Board), Chennai.

== Championships and titles ==
Year	Tournament	Category	Result	Venue
1993	19th Sub-Junior National Carrom Championship	Women's Doubles	Winner	—
1995	21st Sub-Junior National Carrom Championship	Women's Singles	Winner	Delhi
1998	Senior National Carrom Championship	Women's Singles	Winner	Chennai
1998	Indo-Sri Lanka Test Series	Women's Team (India)	Won 3–0	Sri Lanka
1999	Senior National Carrom Championship	Women's Singles	Winner	—
1999	7th Federation Cup (International)	Women's Singles	Winner	Thiruvananthapuram
2000	29th Senior National Carrom Championship	Women's Singles	Winner	Hyderabad
2000	29th Senior National Carrom Championship	Women's Doubles	Winner	Hyderabad
2000	SAARC Carrom Championship	Women's Singles	Winner	Maldives
2000	3rd World Carrom Championship	Women's Team (India)	Gold	New Delhi
2000	XLIII Federation Cup	Women's Singles	Winner	New Delhi
2000	XLIII Federation Cup	Women's Doubles	Winner	New Delhi
2025–26	All India Civil Services Carrom Tournament	Women's Singles	Champion (AICS)	New Delhi

=== Peak rankings ===
Ranking Type	Year	Position
India National Ranking	1999–2000	No. 1 Women's
World Ranking	2000	No. 3 Women's
Tamil Nadu State Ranking	1999–2000	No. 1 Women's
Chennai District Ranking	1999–2000	No. 1 Women's
