= V. D. Trivadi =

V.D. Trivadi (1927–1985) was an Indian humorist, poet, and playwright in English. He was known for his columns and editorials published in The Times of India and was widely regarded as the Art Buchwald or Russell Baker of India. As an essayist, he was considered to be "innovative, attractive, lively and very readable".

Born in Chennai, Trivadi started writing when young and was first published at the age of 12, using the pseudonym of T.V. Dattatreyan. On his first visit to Bombay, the publisher of The Illustrated Weekly of India was surprised to discover that the youth of one of the significant contributors to his magazine. C. R. Mandy, the editor of the magazine, saw the potential brilliance of the young Trivadi and published many of his first poems and articles. Some poems were filled with symbolism and others with wit and candor.

While at school, he was referred to as "a young Shakespeare" and he later studied at the Madras Christian College, where he was considered truly gifted. J. R. Macphail, an English professor and educator, recognized Trivadi's talent.

Some compared Trivadi's humor, nonsensical verse, limericks and poems to Ogden Nash, while others compared him to P. G. Wodehouse. Many of his articles appeared in SPAN, a publication of the American embassy, where he was an editor.

His diverse writing career lasted over 40 years. He also connected talent to publishing houses like Random House. (Ruskin Bond on Trivadi, A View From the Top.)

Primarily of a literary bent, Trivadi was also regarded as someone who tried to establish a first in many areas of book publishing and advertising. As a journalist and editor at newspapers, he wrote articles and editorials that garnered a worldwide fan base and following. His humor and larger-than-life persona led to invitations to attend conferences and universities in many countries. His poetry collection Silver Box, Mail Box was included as part of the curriculum at Oxford University in the UK. Professor Dr. J.I. Hans Bakker of the Guelph University, Ontario, Canada, acknowledged Trivadi as a 'true friend and boon companion' in his publication on the 'Gandhian Approach to Swadeshi or Appropriate Technology' that he dedicated to Trivadi's memory.

Trivadi succumbed to a massive heart attack at the age of 56. Even when suddenly taken ill, he is said to have quipped, "I cannot die yet; I have tickets to the movies." His death occurred before a planned trip as a distinguished guest to universities abroad.

== Partial bibliography ==
In addition to his pieces for The Times of India, Trivadi's work includes the following:

- Silver Box, Mail Box - Poetry Collection
- My Forest - award-winning play
- Gandhi - An Award-Winning Play
- Smuggling - A Novel
- Vivekananda - A Play that he was working on when he died
- Giggly, The Ghost - A Children's Story
