= E. W. Doss =

American politician

E. W. Doss served as a member of the 1869–1871 California State Assembly, representing the 4th District.
