= Achuthanand Tanjore Ravi =

Indian photographer (born 1991)

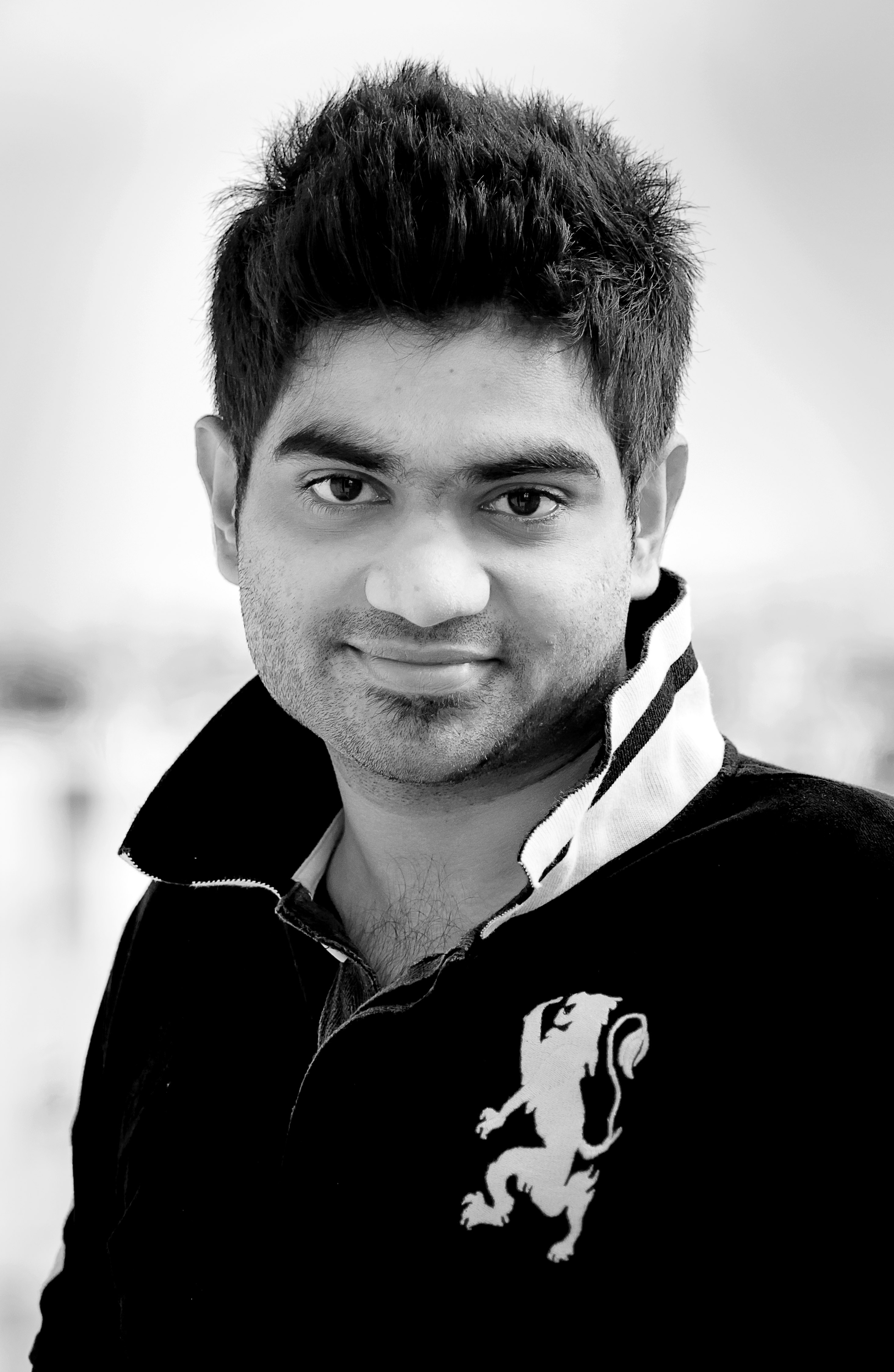
- Born: 22 June 1991 (age 35); Chennai, Tamil Nadu, India
- Occupation: Photographer

Achuthanand Tanjore Ravi (born 22 June 1991, in Chennai, India) is an Indian photographer known for his photojournalism and portraiture photography. His works has been published and has been exhibited at various galleries and museums across India.

== Career ==
Achuthanand began his photojournalism career in 2008 and has spent years working as a freelance photojournalist for agencies nationally and internationally. His photography has taken him to many places in and around India in search of breaking news and documentary material. He is a self-taught photographer and learnt various techniques by attending various workshops by top photojournalist and with the help of the internet. Achuthanand founded the group named as Madras in Motion, a platform for budding photographers along with the help of his friend Ashok Kumar

== Awards and recognition ==
Achuthanand has received recognition for this photographic images, including for "Mahakumbh Mela-2013", a photo documentary on the mahakumbh festival and "Beyond sight", a photo documentary on visually challenged people. He received a grant from UNESCO for this work.
