= M. Buchi Babu Naidu =

Indian cricket pioneer (1868–1908)

Buchi Babu Naidu
- బుచ్చిబాబు నాయుడు
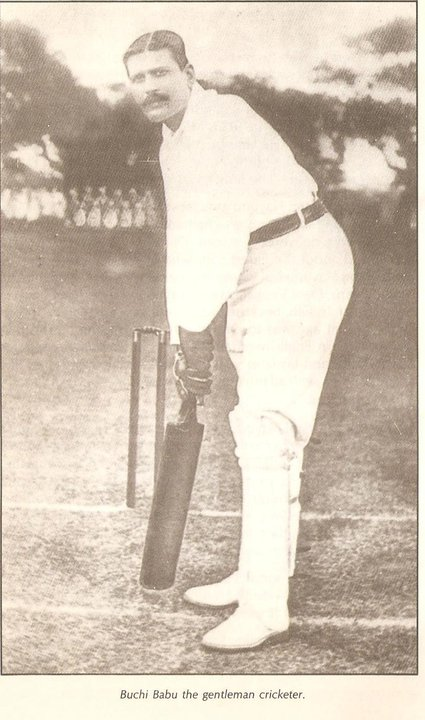
- Born: Mothavarapu Venkata Mahipathi Naidu, మోతవరపు వెంకట మహిపతి నాయుడు Madras, Madras Presidency
- Died: 19 December 1908 (aged c. 40); Madras, Madras Presidency
- Occupation: Cricketer
- Known for: Father of Madras Cricket

Mothavarapu Venkata Mahipathi Naidu (1868–1908), popularly known as Buchi Babu Naidu was an Indian cricket pioneer in the colonial era who organised cricket clubs for native Indians. He is considered to be the 'Father of Madras Cricket'. He founded the annual Madras Presidency Matches, the first of which was held shortly after his death. The annual Buchi Babu Tournament is held in his honour. Two of Naidu's sons, M. Baliah Naidu and C. Ramaswami, played for the Indian national cricket team.

== Early life ==
Buchi Babu Naidu was born as Mothavarapu Venkata Mahipathi Naidu (మోతవరపు వెంకట మహిపతి నాయుడు) in 1868 as the eldest of five brothers of a Telugu Balija family hailing from Nellore. He was adopted by his maternal grandfather, Mothavarapu Dera Venkataswami Naidu. His family was involved as dubashes (interpreters and middlemen in business dealings with the British) and became enormously wealthy from their business dealings. He inherited much of his grandfather's fortune at an early age. Naidu graduated from the Presidency College, Madras.

== Career ==
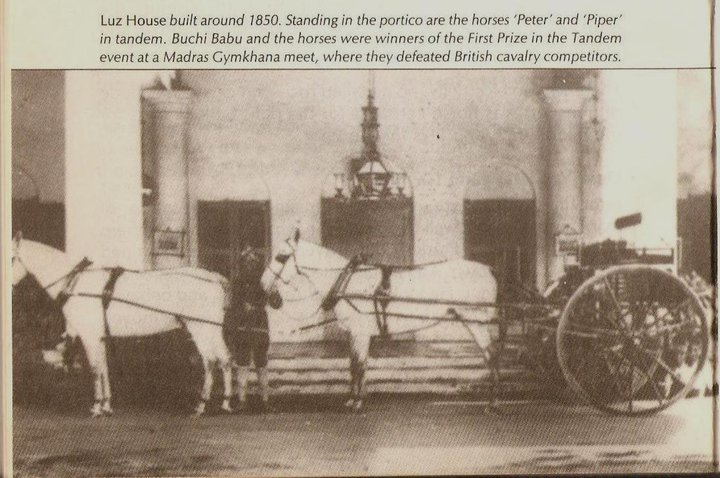
Luz House built around 1850

Naidu, who loved sports, energetically set about organising the sporting scene in Madras. Madras cricket in its formative years was dominated by the British. The Madras Cricket Club (MCC), established in 1846, was their exclusive preserve and Babu's interest in the game grew watching them play at Chepauk. He used to be taken there as a child by his two English nannies. From his sprawling bungalow Luz House, located in Mylapore, he worked on his game.

=== Madras United Cricket Club ===
In the Madras Cricket Club, Indian players were required to sit under the tree and eat their lunch in the shade, while the European players enjoyed the comfort of the club's pavilion. Outraged by this, Naidu had helped found the Madras United Cricket Club (now Madras United Club or MUC), which focused on taking sport to Indians in the city. In 1888, he took an area near Esplanade and got it levelled. Six pitches were prepared in that ground. The club's founding was a landmark in the history of Madras cricket. The club's ground provided a space for locals to play. Naidu organised the matches and trained the Indian players. When necessary he provided the necessary attire and equipment for promising individuals. The club started playing regularly against MCC.

=== The Presidency Match ===
Naidu's dream was to have an annual fixture where the best local players would take on the Englishmen of the MCC, which evolved into the annual Presidency Match. This match was first played in 1908, shortly after his death. Subsequently, it was played annually from 1915 to 1952 and was commonly known as the Pongal Match because it was played during the harvest festival week. It was very popular before the introduction of Test cricket and became the Presidency's biggest fixture until the Ranji Trophy competition was started in the 1930s.

== Personal life ==
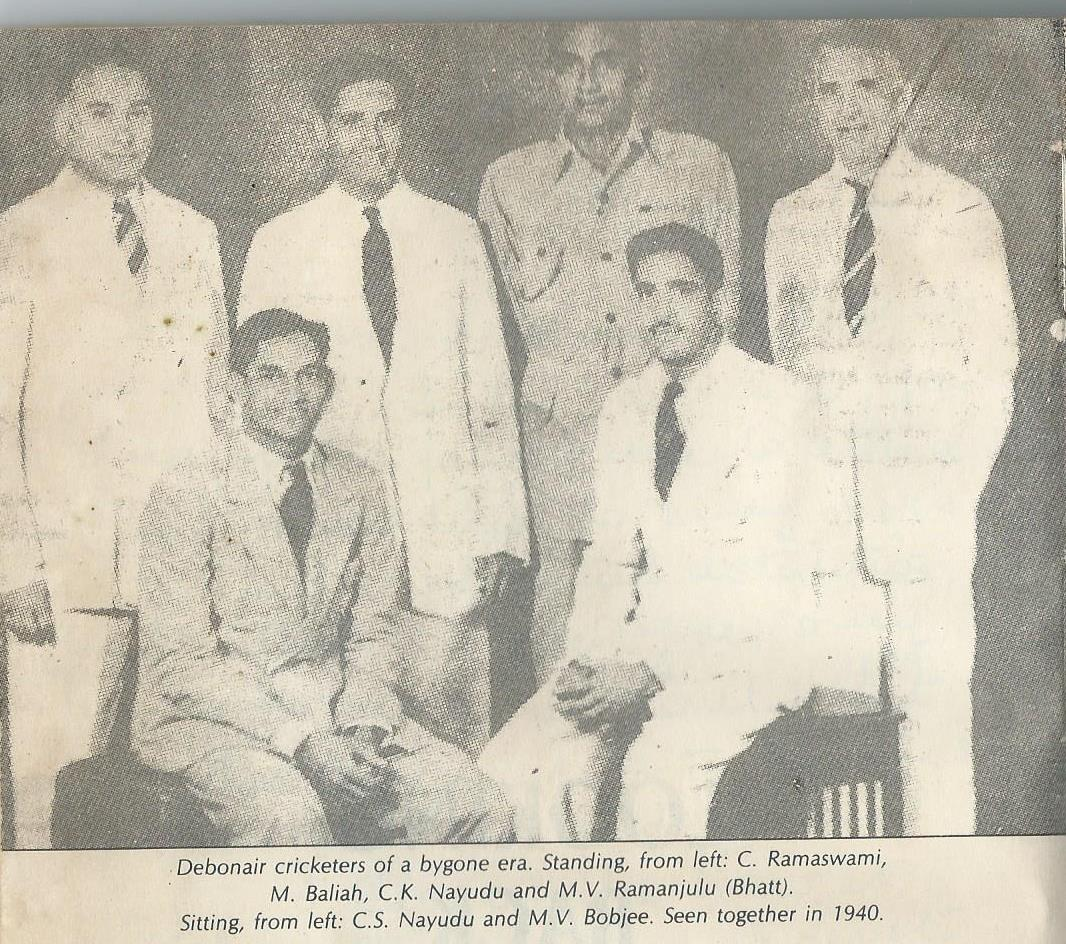
Standing from left C. Ramaswami, M. Baliah, C. K. Nayudu and M. V. Ramanjulu (Bhatt). Sitting from left: C. S. Nayudu and M. V. Bobjee

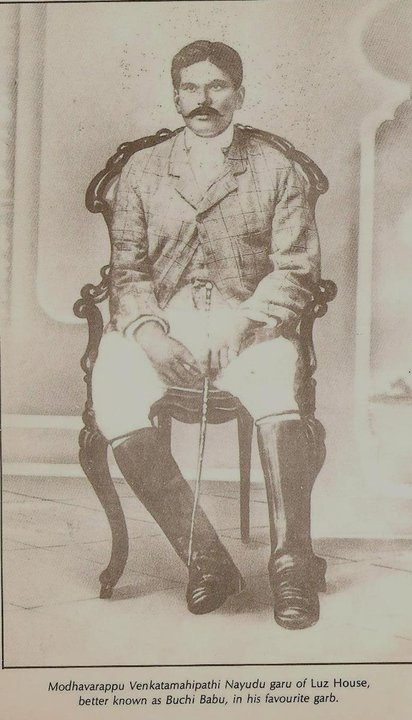
Buchi Babu in his favourite garb

Buchi Babu Naidu was proficient in riding, tennis and cricket, while his younger brother Chitti Babu was a tennis champion, and a cricketer. Buchi Babu's three sons – Venkataramanujulu (Bhatt), M. Baliah Naidu and Cotah Ramaswami also played in the early Presidency matches. Ramaswami later went on to represent India in both cricket and tennis. After his retirement, Ramaswami was part of the national selection panel for nearly two decades. Several of Naidu's grandsons were also cricketers, playing the Ranji Trophy and league cricket.

== Legacy ==
The Buchi Babu memorial tournament began in 1909–10, a year after Babu's death, and it was conceived as a tournament between local sides. Its profile got a big lift in the late 1960s when it was converted to an invitational tournament, with outstation stars coming in and the Tamil Nadu Cricket Association taking control of its organisation.

Cricket in Madras till Buchi Babu Naidu changed the scenario was an Englishman's game. A few Indians tried to imitate what they got a glimpse of watching from the outfield of the Madras Cricket Club's hallowed ground at Chepauk, but the real players were the British colonialists till Buchi Babu came along and offered them an Indian challenge. Not only did MUC-MCC cricket matches then become regular features but the Indians vs Europeans presidency match become the Presidency's biggest fixture until the Ranji Trophy competition came along in the 1930s.
