= Praveena Solomon =

Indian businesswoman

- Education: University of Madras
- Occupations: Crematorium manager, social worker

Praveena Solomon is a crematorium manager of Chennai’s oldest and busiest cremation ground.

Solomon started caretaking the Velankadu crematorium as part of her affiliation with an NGO.

== Education ==
Solomon is an English literature graduate from the University of Madras. She has also studied Nursing. Solomon was introduced to social work by her mother, who worked closely with social worker Sarojini Varadappan.

== Career ==
She joined the NGO named Indian Community Welfare Organisation (ICWO) in 2004, working as a field officer and educating underprivileged children and sex workers.

In March 2014, ICWO won the contract to run the 120-year-old Valankadu crematorium. Solomon, as caretaker of the crematorium, faced initial challenges. Initially she did not have the support of the local community, who were opposed to a woman running a burial ground. Some members of the community even threatened to attack her with acid.

Eventually, she managed to win over the community, with a combination of support from the police and her own hard efforts. Solomon worked to change the looks of crematorium. Now people say it looks like a park.

Solomon's position marks the first time a woman has running a burial ground in Tamil Nadu, where—like in most parts of the country—upkeep of crematorium is traditionally a male domain.
