= Jesu Pudumai Doss =

Jesu Pudumai Doss, M.J. is a Catholic priest and a religious, specifically a Salesian of Don Bosco (SDB: a member of Society of St. Francis of Sales), from Chennai, India.

He is a Professor and Dean, Faculty of Canon Law, Salesian Pontifical University, Rome.

== Birth and schooling ==
He was born in Chennai, the then Madras, (St. Roque's Parish, Old Washermenpet) on 25 December 1967, as the fifth child of (late) Mr. Maria James and Mrs. Amalapushpam, both professors and eminent educationists.

He did his early schooling at St. Mary's Nursery School (now St. Mary's Matriculation Higher Secondary School), Old Washermenpet, Chennai (1971–1978). It was the first private school established by Mr. Maria James, his father.

After his Middle School at St. Gabriel's Higher Secondary School, Broadway, Chennai (1978–1981), run by Salesians of Don Bosco, he went to Don Bosco Matriculation Higher Secondary School, Tirupattur, for four years (1981–1985), where he began (the aspirantate) his initial studies towards entering the Salesian Congregation.

== Religious and higher studies ==
Concluding the Novitiate at Don Bosco, Coimbatore (1985–1986), he made his First Religious Salesian Profession on 24 May 1986. After the Philosophical Studies at Yercaud (1986–1988), he was one of the first batch of B.Sc. Computer Science students at Sacred Heart College, Tirupattur (1988–1991).

After the Salesian training experience at Don Bosco Aspirantate, Tirupattur (1991–1993) he made his Perpetual Profession in the Salesian Congregation on 24 May 1993 at Don Bosco, Thanjavur. He had been working also at Don Bosco Aspirantate, Thanjavur (1993–1994) and Don Bosco Apostolic School, Pannur (1999–2000).

Later he began his Bachelor in Theological Studies at Salesian Pontifical University, Rome (1994–1997), staying at the salesian community of Gerini, Rome, and was ordained a priest by His Exc. Most Rev. Bishop Joseph Antony, SDB, then Bishop of Dharmapuri, at Francis Xavier's Parish (Mary Help of Christians Shrine), Broadway, Chennai, on 25 July 1998.

== University studies ==
He did his Licentiate in Canon Law (Latin Catholic Church) at the Faculty of Canon Law, Salesian Pontifical University, Rome (1997–1999), followed by his Doctorate in Canon Law in the same university (2000–2003).

Apart from this, he holds a Licentiate in Oriental Canon Law from Pontifical Oriental Institute, Rome (2004–2005), and three other post-graduate degrees in English Literature (M.A.) from University of Madras, Chennai (1999–2001), in Education (M.A.) from Periyar University, Salem (2009–2010) and in Indian Civil Law (LL.M.) from Sri Venketeswara University, Tirupathi (2010–2012).

== Academic responsibilities ==
He is a professor at the Faculty of Canon Law at Salesian Pontifical University, Rome, already from 2002. He lectures mainly on Religious Life, Clerics, Lay People and Teaching Function of the Church, especially on Catechetics and Education, apart from Special Procedural Laws on Marriage, Clerics and Religious Life.

He was the Dean of the Faculty of Canon Law, Salesian Pontifical University, from 2011 to 2012. He was appointed again as Dean of the same faculty in April 2015.

Besides teaching at UPS, he is also a regular visiting professor at Don Bosco Theological Centre, Chennai, as was occasionally at other Theological Centres in Bangalore (Kristu Jyoti College) and Shillong (Sacred Heart College), India and at the Faculty of Canon Law, Cardinal Stefan Wyszyński University (UKSW), Warsaw, Poland.

== Canonical responsibilities ==
He is also an External Judge, from 2006, in the Regional Tribunal for Lazio of the Vicariate of Rome; a Special Commissioner for favor fidei cases at the Congregation for the Doctrine of Faith at the Vatican from 2007; and a Defender of Bond for the Non-Consummated Marriage Cases, at the Special Office at the Roman Rota, Vatican. In July 2015, he was appointed by Pope Francis as Consultor of the Congregation for Institutes of Consecrated Life and Societies of Apostolic Life, Vatican.

He is a member of various Canon Law associations and societies, specifically those of India, of United States and of Great Britain and Ireland, and is a member of the Bar Council of Tamil Nadu and Pondicherry. He is also Canon Law consultant to various Italian dioceses and religious institutes (especially Salesian provinces).

== Publications ==
Apart from contributing papers in international seminars and to various international journals on Canon Law (Catholic Church law), on Education, on Human Rights (especially Child Rights), etc., he has authored the following books:

- Child Protection Laws in India (Don Bosco Youth Animation - South Asia, New Delhi 2015).
- Freedom of Enquiry and Expression in the Catholic Church: A Canonico-Theological Study (Kristu Jyoti Publications, Bangalore 2007).

=== Edited & co-edited books ===
- Empowering
- Education in Today’s India (Don Bosco Youth Animation - South Asia, New Delhi 2015).
- With Gentleness and Love. Don Bosco and Education of the Young (Don Bosco Publications, Chennai 2015).
- Youth and Family in Today’s India (Don Bosco Publications, Chennai 2014).
- "Vino nuovo in otri vecchi?" Sfide pastorali e giuridiche della "Nuova Evangelizzazione" (Libreria Editrice Vaticana, Città del Vaticano 2013).
- India Oggi. Cultura ed Educazione, I & II Part, in Salesianum 74 (3-4/2012).
- Iustitiam et iudicium facere. Scritti in onore del Prof. Don Sabino Ardito, SDB (Libreria Ateneo Salesiano, Roma 2011).
- Education of the Young in Today`s India (Don Bosco Publications, Chennai 2011).
- La missione del prete nella missione della Chiesa. “Noi, infatti, non annunciamo noi stessi, ma Cristo Gesù Signore” (Libreria Editrice Vaticana, Città del

Vaticano 2010).

- Parola di Dio e legislazione ecclesiastica (Libreria Ateneo Salesiano, Roma 2008).
- Youth India: Situation, Challenges & Prospects (Kristu Jyoti Publications, Bangalore 2006).

== Websites ==
- http://www.unisal.it/
