= Hatsun Agro Product =

Indian dairy company

Hatsun Agro Product Ltd
- Company type: Public
- Traded as: BSE: 531531; NSE: HATSUN
- ISIN: INE473B01035
- Founded: 1970; 56 years ago
- Founder: R. G. Chandramogan
- Headquarters: Chennai, Tamil Nadu, India
- Area served: India
- Key people: R. G. Chandramogan (Chairman); C. Sathyan (Managing Director)
- Products: Dairy products
- Brands: Arun Icecreams; Arokya; Hatsun; HAP daily; Ibaco; Santosa
- Revenue: ▲₹9,972.94 crore (US$1.0 billion) (FY2026)
- Operating income: ▲₹470.46 crore (US$49 million) (FY2026)
- Net income: ▲₹360.60 crore (US$38 million) (FY2026)
- Subsidiaries: Milk Mantra
- Website: www.hap.in
- Footnotes / references Financials as of 19 May 2026.

Hatsun Agro Product Ltd, often referred to as Hatsun or HAP, is an Indian private sector dairy company, headquartered in Chennai. It was founded by R. G. Chandramogan in 1970.

It also exports dairy ingredient products to overseas markets.

In 2025, it acquired Bhubaneswar-based Milk Mantra for ₹233 crore (US$24 million).
