= M. Baliah Naidu =

Indian cricketer (1895–1948)

M.Baliah Naidu
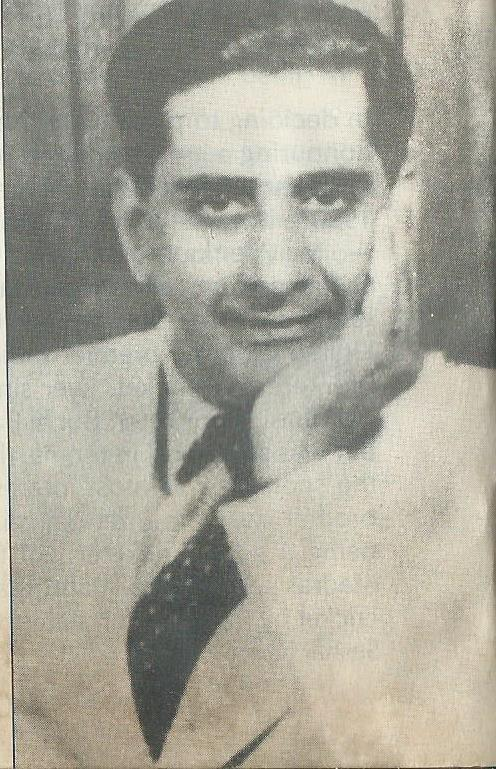
- Born: 1895
- Died: 1948 (aged 52–53); Madras Presidency, India
- Occupation: Cricketer

Mothavarapu Baliah Naidu (1895–1948, Madras) was an Indian cricketer during Madras Presidency. He was born into a Telugu family as the second son of the Bhatt brothers, sons of the Buchi Babu Nayudu, "The Father of South Indian cricket", the doyen of Madras Cricket. Baliah was also a left hand medium-paced bowler and a stylish left hander who earned the tag "Madras Woolley" of the pre-war period. He represented the Hindus in the Bombay quadrangular and led Madras against Bombay in the final of the second edition of the Ranji Trophy.

== The Bhatt Brothers ==
The Bhatt brothers blossomed in to great cricketers from early ages of 13 to 16, when they joined wesley High school. Before long, they began to dominate inter-collegiate matches, hitting hundreds at will. They possessed the unique record of three brothers playing at the same time for MUC and Presidency Indians. All three Captained Madras in the Ranji Trophy Tournament. The three progenies who in due course left their imprint on the game. The eldest of the siblings Venkatramanujalu alias bhatt was known for his pyrotechnics, he was only right-hander among the three talented "Bhat" brothers was an all-rounder in cricket. He opened the innings for Madras, following the footsteps of his father who founded the Madras polo riders club.

M. Baliah was the second son of the bhatt brothers, On two occasions in the presidency match, Baliah turned the match around to great victory. Against a Jackryder's XI attack that included Mc Cartney, Ryder and Ron Oxenham, Baliah was brilliant, treating pace and spin alike with an "audacious brilliance". C. Ramaswami, the youngest son of the Buchi Babu Naidu, was one of the two Indian "Double Internationals". Ramaswami was one of the members of the Madras team that defeated Mysore within a day in the inaugural Ranji Trophy match in December 1934.

== Career ==
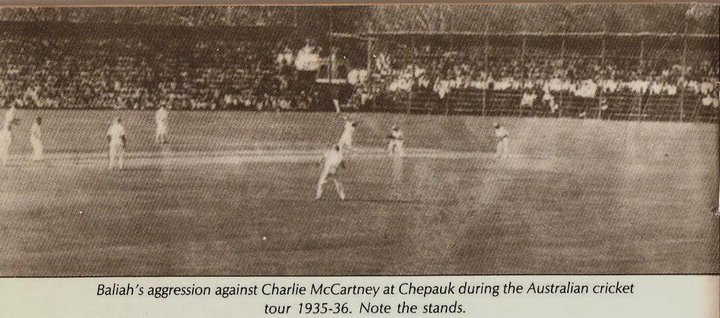
Baliah's aggression against Charlie McCartney 1935–36

Madras comprised four of today's states: Tamilnadu, Karnataka, Andhra Pradesh, and Kerala. In the First Presidency match of 1915, Baliah remained unbeaten on 70 in a second innings total. Baliah's golden moment was against the Marylebone Cricket Club, England who toured India under Douglas Jardine in 1933–34. While the other members of the Indian Cricket Federation team quailed before the leading fast bowlers, his 36-run knock brought out all the richness of his batting and evoked unstinted praise from E. H. D. Sewell in the columns of the Times of India. Baliah, who captained the Indian Cricket Federation (ICF), saved the innings from being an utter rout.

In 1935, when Baliah captained Madras in their match against Delhi, he was the guest of the Viceroy of India, Lord Willingdon. His 55 against the team led by Jack Ryder in 1936 was meritorious.

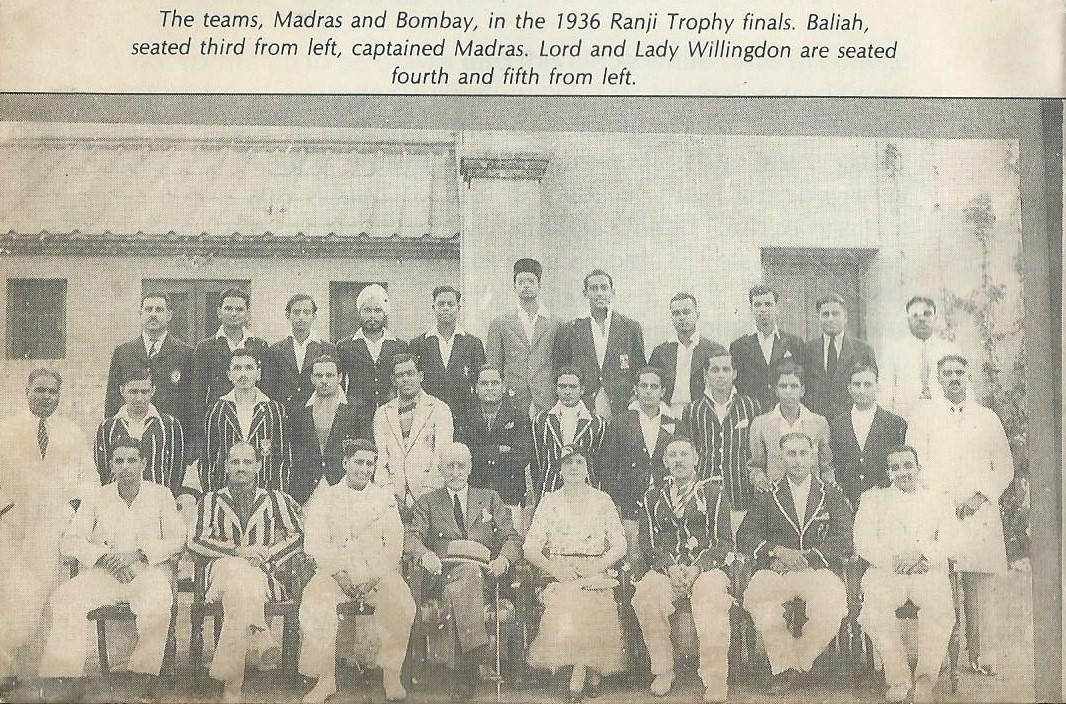
Baliah Captained Madras in the Ranji Trophy finals in 1936

Baliah scored a superlative century in the Buchi Babu Memorial Tournament, playing for the Mylapore Recreation club against the Minerva Cricket Club. Hyder Ali, the versatile Hyderabad medium–pacer bowler, became desperate trying to contain Baliah's flow of strokes. Later, Baliah enhanced the day's cricket with two beautiful catches in the slips.

About Baliah, P. N. Sundearesan, a cricketer and editor of Hindu wrote, "In October 1953 it would indeed be a hopeless task to put in words the sinuous grace of M. Baliah's skill off the field. His well-proportional figure dressed with an eye to style stood out and on it he ruled as a great benefactor distributing his charms lavishly. Baliah would play almost all the strokes in the game from the late cut to the leg glance and stamp every one of them with his genius."

== Later life ==
Baliah rode in hunt races, winning many prizes a good rider who won the South India Amateur Championship, held by the Cosmopolitan Club in 1940. In memory for contribution to Tamilnadu cricket, the Tamilnadu Cricket Association (TNCA) instituted a trophy after M. Baliah in revered memory awarded to the best collegiate cricketer in the state.

Eldest Brother: M Venkataramanjulu; youngest Brother: C Ramaswami (double International); Grandson: P Ramesh; Nephew: MV Bobjee; Nephew: MV Prakash; Nephew: C Ramaswaroop; Son: M Suryanarayan; Son: MM Kumar all played first class Indian cricket.
