= 1919 New Year Honours =

Appointments by King George V

The 1919 New Year Honours were appointments by King George V to various orders and honours to reward and highlight good works by citizens of the British Empire. The appointments were published in The London Gazette and The Times in January 1919.

The recipients of honours are displayed here as they were styled before their new honour, and arranged by honour, with classes (Knight, Knight Grand Cross, etc.) and then divisions (Military, Civil, etc.) as appropriate.

== Baronetcies ==
- Sir Lewis Amherst Selby-Bigge KCB Secretary to the Board of Education
- Sir Maurice William Ernest de Bunsen GCMG GCVO CB formerly His Britannic Majesty's Ambassador Extraordinary and Plenipotentiary at Vienna
- The Right Honourable Judge John Ross, Judge of the High Court of Justice in Ireland, Chancery Division

== Knight Bachelor ==
- His Honour Judge Edward Bray, Judge of the Bloomsbury County Court; Chairman of the Council of County Court Judges
- Thomas Willes Chitty, Master of the Supreme Court of Justice, King's Bench Division
- Sigmund Dannreuther, Controller and Accounting Officer, Ministry of Munitions
- Patrick Quinn MVO
- Robert Blyth Greig Scottish Board of Agriculture
- Lucas White King CSI
- William Leslie Mackenzie Medical Member of the Local Government Board for Scotland
- Hugh William Orange CB CIE Accountant General, Board of Education
- Alfred Walter Soward CB a Commissioner of Inland Revenue; Secretary, Estate Duty Office
- Richard Stephens Taylor, President of the Law Society; Chairman of Law Society Advisory Committee; and Chairman of Civil Liabilities Committee.
- George Danvers Thane FRCS Principal Inspector under Cruelty to Animals Act Home Office

British India

- Justice Ernest Edward Fletcher, a Puisne Judge of the High Court at Calcutta
- George Cochrane Godfrey, Coal Controller in India
- Robert Herriot Henderson CIE Assam
- William Arthur Beardsell, Sheriff of Madras
- Prafulla Chandra Ray CIE late Provincial Educational Service, Bengal
- Chimanlal Harilal Setalvad, Vice-Chancellor, Bombay University
- Joseph Henry Stone CIE Director of Public Instruction, Madras

Dominions

- Leicester Paul Beaufort lately Judge of the High Court of Northern Rhodesia
- The Honourable Worley Bassett Edwards, a Judge of the Supreme Court of the Dominion of New Zealand
- Walter Edwin Gurney, lately Controller and Auditor-General of the Union of South Africa
- Thomas Wagstaffe Haycraft, the Chief Justice of Grenada
- John Hewat Lieutenant-Colonel, South African Defence Force, Member of the House of Assembly of the Union of South Africa and Assistant Director of Medical Services of the said Union
- Samuel Hordern, of the City of Sydney, President of the Royal Agricultural Society of New South Wales
- Henry Jones, of the City of Hobart, in the State of Tasmania
- Joseph James Kinsey, of the City of Christchurch, in the Dominion of New Zealand
- James William Murison Judge of the Court for Zanzibar
- Boshan Wei Yuk CMG formerly Unofficial Member of the Legislative Council of the Colony of Hong Kong

== The Most Honourable Order of the Bath ==
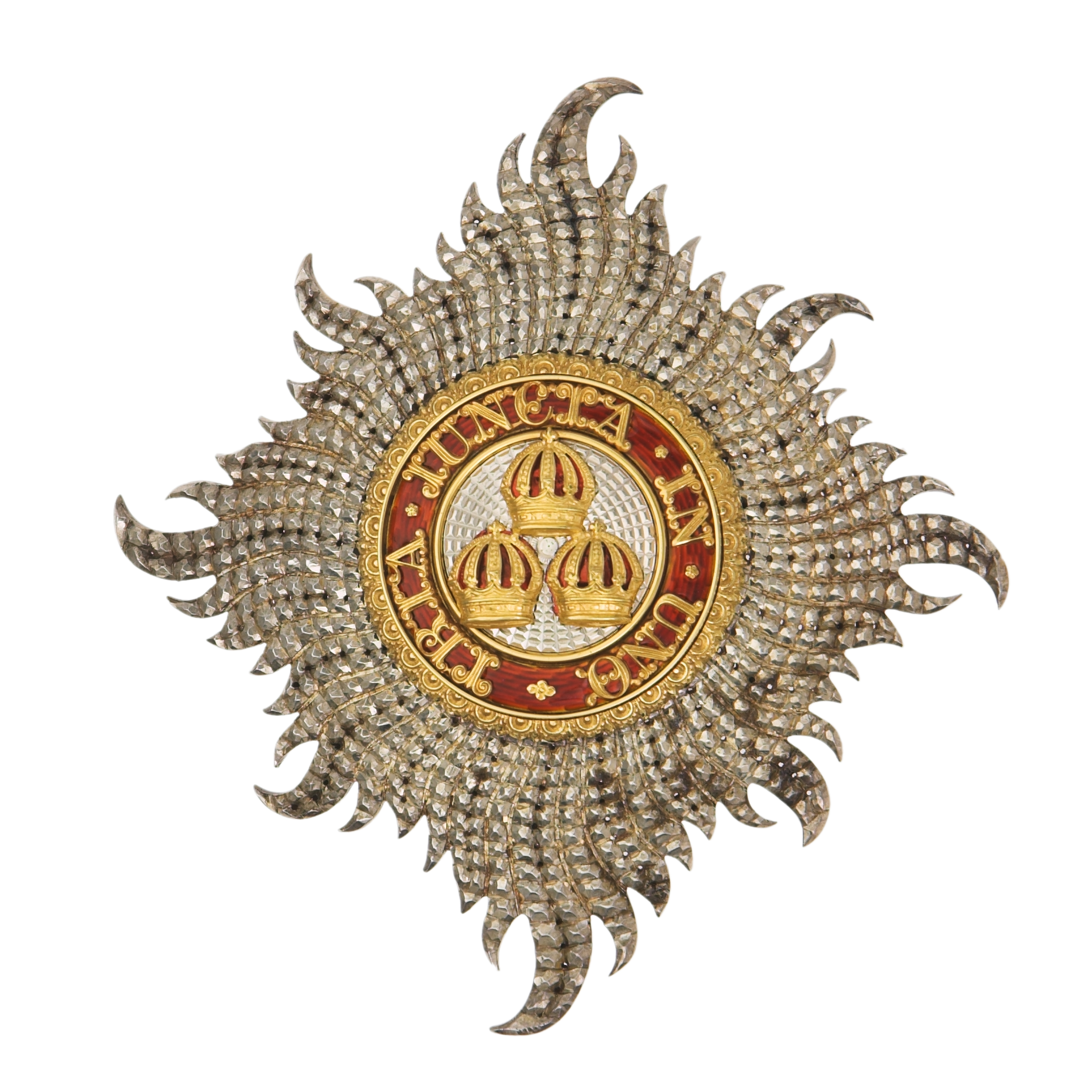
Civilian star of the Knight Grand Cross of the Order of the Bath

=== Knight Grand Cross of the Order of the Bath (GCB) ===
==== Military Division ====
Royal Navy

- Acting Admiral Sir Charles Edward Madden KCB KCMG CVO

Army

- General Sir Charles Carmichael Monro GCMG KCB ADC

For valuable services rendered in connection with the military operations in France and Flanders:

- General Sir Henry Seymour Rawlinson Bt GCVO KCB KCMG
- General The Honourable Sir Julian Hedworth George Byng KCB KCMG MVO

==== Civil Division ====
- The Right Honourable Sir Eric Campbell Geddes GBE KCB First Lord of the Admiralty

=== Knight Commander of the Order of the Bath (KCB) ===
==== Military Division ====
Royal Navy

- Vice-Admiral Trevylyan Dacres Willis Napier CB MVO
- Rear-Admiral Arthur Cavenagh Leveson CB
- Rear-Admiral Sydney Robert Fremantle CB MVO
- Rear-Admiral William Edmund Goodenough CB MVO
- Rear-Admiral Edwyn Sinclair Alexander-Sinclair CB MVO
- Rear-Admiral Walter Henry Cowan CB DSO MVO
- Paymaster Captain Francis Harrison Smith CB RN

Army

- Major-General George Joseph Hamilton Evatt CB
- Major-General Charles Harington Harington CB DSO
- Lieutenant-General Thomas Herbert John Chapman Goodwin CB CMG DSO KHS Army Medical Service

For valuable services rendered in connection with the military operations in France and Flanders:

- Major-General Cameron Deane Shute CB CMG
- Major-General David Graham Mushcet Campbell CB
- Major-General Charles Henry Burtchaell CB CMG KHS Army Medical Service
- Major-General Reginald Byng Stephens CB CMG
- Major-General William Charles Giffard Heneker CB DSO
- Major-General Evan Eyare Carter CB CMG MVO
- Lieutenant-General Sir Claud William Jacob KCB
- Major-General Archibald Armar Montgomery CB
- Major-General Gerard Moore Heath CB DSO
- Major-General William George Bertram Boyce CB DSO
- Major-General Arlington Augustus Chichester CB DSO
- Major-General John Humphrey Davidson CB DSO
- Major-General Travers Edwards Clarke CB

Canadian Forces

- Major-General Archibald Cameron Macdonell CB CMG DSO

Australian Forces

- Major-General Charles Rosenthal CB CMG DSO

For valuable services rendered in connection with Military Operations in Egypt:

- Major-General Sir Walter Campbell KCMG CB DSO
- Major-General Sir Louis Jean Bols KCMG CB DSO

For valuable services rendered in connection with Military Operations in Salonika:

- Major-General George Townshend Forestier-Walker CB

Royal Air Force

- Major-General Frederick Hugh Sykes CMG
- Major-General William Sefton Brancker AFC
- Major-General John Maitland Salmond CMG CVO DSO

==== Civil Division ====
- Robert Elliott-Cooper, Chairman of the War Office Committee on Hutted Camps
- James Thomson Currie, Personal Assistant to the Surveyor-General of Supply
- William Henry Beveridge CB Second Secretary, Ministry of Food
- John Westerman Cawston CB Deputy Master of the Mint
- Malcolm Delevingne CB Assistant Under Secretary of State, Home Office
- Joshua Albert Flynn CB Acting Permanent Secretary, Ministry of Munitions
- Sir George Vandeleur Fiddes GCMG CB Permanent Under Secretary of State, Colonial Office
- George Fottrell, Clerk of the Crown and Peace for County and City of Dublin
- Albert Gray CB KC Counsel to Chairman of Committees, House of Lords
- Sir Esmé William Howard KCMG CVO His Britannic Majesty's Envoy Extraordinary and Minister Plenipotentiary at Stockholm
- James Edward Masterton-Smith CB Assistant Secretary, Ministry of Munitions
- Ernest Robert Moon CB KC Counsel to the Right Honourable The Speaker
- William Arthur Robinson CB Secretary to the Air Ministry
- Malcolm Cotter Cariston Seton CB Secretary to the Judicial and Public Department, India Office
- William Sutherland, Private Secretary to the Prime Minister
- Graeme Thomson CB Director of Transport, Ministry of Shipping
- John Charles Gabriel Sykes, Secretary to the Liquor Control Board

=== Companion of the Order of the Bath (CB) ===
==== Military Division ====
Royal Navy

- Vice-Admiral Francis Spurstow Miller
- Captain Sir Malcolm MacGregor Bt CMG
- Captain Michael Henry Hodges MVO
- Captain Hugh Justin Tweedie
- Captain Douglas Lionel Dent CMG
- Captain Frederick Aubrey Whitehead
- Captain John Donald Kelly
- Captain Henry Tritton Buller MVO
- Captain John William Leopold McClintock DSO
- Captain Berwick Curtis DSO
- Engineer Captain Edward John Weeks
- Commander Archibald Bertram Watson Higginson DSO
- Commander Edward Altham
- Paymaster Commander Bertram Cowles Allen MVO

Army

- Temp Major-General Fabian Arthur Goulstone Ware CMG General List
- Colonel Chailes Henry Cowie CIE Royal Engineers
- Lieutenant-Colonel and Brevet Colonel James Gurwood King-King DSO late Royal West Surrey Regiment
- Lieutenant-Colonel and Brevet Colonel Robert James Ross CMG Staff
- Lieutenant-Colonel and Brevet Colonel Geoffrey Herbert Anthony White CMG DSO Royal Artillery
- Major and Brevet Colonel Walter Mervyn St. George Kirke CMG DSO Royal Artillery
- Colonel Charles Kenyon Burnett CMG late 18th Hussars
- Major and Brevet Colonel Charles Parker Deedes CMG DSO Yorkshire Light Infantry
- Lieutenant-Colonel Fernaud Gustavo Eugene Cannot CMG DSO Royal Army Service Corps
- Major and Brevet Lieutenant-Colonel Arthur Olver CMG FRCVS Royal Army Veterinary Corps
- Colonel Arundel Martyn CMG

For valuable services rendered in connection with the military operations in France and Flanders:

- Colonel Charles Edward Baddeley CMG
- Colonel John Cecil Wray CMG MVO Royal Artillery
- Lieutenant-Colonel Thomas Ogilvie CMG Gordon Highlanders
- Colonel Charles Augustus Young CMG Army Medical Service
- Temp Colonel Andrew Fullerton CMG FRCSI Army Medical Service
- Colonel Neil Wolseley Haig CMG
- Lieutenant-Colonel and Brevet Colonel Ernest Wright Alexander VC CMG Royal Artillery
- Lieutenant-Colonel and Brevet Colonel Harry Stebbing Bush CMG Royal Army Ordnance Corps
- Lieutenant-Colonel and Brevet Colonel Arthur Wharton Peck CMG 25th Cavalry, Indian Army
- Lieutenant-Colonel and Brevet Colonel Francis John Duncan CMG DSO Royal Scots
- Major and Brevet Colonel Gerald Farrell Boyd CMG DSO DCM Royal Irish Regiment
- Major and Brevet Colonel Percival Otway Hambro CMG 15th Hussars
- Lieutenant-Colonel and Brevet Colonel John Samuel Jocelyn Percy CMG DSO East Lancashire Regiment
- Lieutenant-Colonel and Brevet Colonel Arthur Solly-Flood CMG DSO 4th Dragoon Guards
- Temp Colonel Gerald Charles Adolphe Marescaux CMG Special List (Royal Navy, Retired)
- Temp Colonel Hamilton Ashley Ballance FRCS Army Medical Service
- Colonel Thomas Edward Marshall CMG Royal Artillery
- Lieutenant-Colonel and Brevet Colonel George Henry Basil Freeth CMG DSO Lancashire Fusiliers
- Lieutenant-Colonel and Brevet Colonel George Tupper Campbell Carter-Campbell DSO Scottish Rifles
- Colonel Theophilus Percy Jones CMG Army Medical Service
- Colonel Archibald Buchanan Ritchie CMG
- Lieutenant-Colonel and Brevet Colonel Clifford Coffin VC DSO Royal Engineers
- Lieutenant-Colonel and Brevet Colonel Thomas Aktley Cubitt CMG DSO Royal Artillery
- Major and Brevet Colonel John Cartwright Harding Newman CMG Essex Regiment
- Major and Brevet Colonel Harold Whitla Higginson DSO Royal Dublin Fusiliers
- Lieutenant-Colonel and Brevet Colonel Kenneth John Kincaid-Smith CMG DSO Royal Artillery
- Lieutenant-Colonel and Brevet Colonel Arthur Durham Kirby CMG Royal Artillery
- Major and Brevet Colonel Harry Hugh Sidney Knox DSO Northamptonshire Regiment
- Lieutenant-Colonel and Brevet Colonel John William Fraser Lamont CMG DSO Royal Artillery
- Lieutenant-Colonel and Brevet Colonel William Percival Monkhouse CMG MVO Royal Artillery
- Lieutenant-Colonel and Brevet Colonel William Patrick Eric Newbigging CMG DSO Manchester Regiment
- Lieutenant-Colonel and Brevet Colonel Arthur Montagu Perreau CMG Royal Artillery
- Lieutenant-Colonel and Brevet Colonel George Herbert Sanders CMG DSO Royal Artillery
- Lieutenant-Colonel and Brevet Colonel Herbert Cecil Sheppard CMG DSO Royal Artillery
- Major and Brevet Colonel James Bruce Gregorie Tulloch CMG Yorkshire Light Infantry
- Lieutenant-Colonel and Brevet Colonel William Danvers Waghorn CMG Royal Engineers
- Colonel Douglas Edward Cayley CMG
- Lieutenant-Colonel Charles Donald Raynsford Watts CMG Royal Army Ordnance Corps
- Lieutenant-Colonel Hugh John Males Marshall CMG Royal Engineers
- Lieutenant-Colonel Edward Nathan Whitley CMG DSO Royal Field Artillery
- Lieutenant-Colonel Henry Jenkins Brock CMG DSO Royal Artillery
- Lieutenant-Colonel Herbert Willie Andrew Christie CMG Royal Artillery
- Lieutenant-Colonel Arthur Stawell Jenour CMG DSO Royal Artillery
- Lieutenant-Colonel Norman Bruce Bainbridge CMG DSO Royal Army Ordnance Corps
- Lieutenant-Colonel William Robarts Napier Madocks CMG DSO Royal Artillery
- Lieutenant-Colonel William Frederick Mildren CMG DSO London Regiment
- Major and Brevet Lieutenant-Colonel Robert McDounall CMG DSO East Kent Regiment
- Lieutenant-Colonel Robert Gabbett Parker CMG DSO East Lancashire Regiment
- Major and Brevet Lieutenant-Colonel Cecil Faber Aspinall CMG DSO Royal Munster Fusiliers
- Lieutenant-Colonel Arthur Ellershaw CMG DSO Royal Artillery
- Lieutenant-Colonel Thomas Edward Topping CMG DSO Royal Field Artillery
- Major and Brevet Lieutenant-Colonel Edward Lacy Challenor CMG DSO Leicestershire Regiment
- Major and Brevet Lieutenant-Colonel Ross John Finnis Hayter CMG DSO Cheshire Regiment
- Lieutenant-Colonel William Lushington Osborn CMG DSO Royal Sussex Regiment
- Major and Brevet Lieutenant-Colonel Edward Weyland Martin Powell CMG DSO late Royal Artillery
- Major and Brevet Lieutenant-Colonel Clifton Inglis Stockwell DSO Royal Welsh Fusiliers
- Major and Brevet Lieutenant-Colonel The Honourable Robert White CMG DSO late Royal Welsh Fusiliers
- Temp Lieutenant-Colonel Cyril Aubrey Blacklock CMG DSO General List
- Temp Lieutenant-Colonel Brodie Haldane Henderson CMG Royal Engineers
- Major and Brevet Lieutenant-Colonel Algernon Cautley Jeffcoat CMG DSO Royal Fusiliers
- Major and Brevet Lieutenant-Colonel Lionel Warren de Vere Sadleir-Jackson CMG DSO 9th Lancers
- Lieutenant-Colonel Guy Hamilton Boileau CMG DSO Royal Engineers
- Captain and Brevet Lieutenant-Colonel William Thomas Francis Horwood DSO
- Major-General Reginald Ulick Henry Buckland CB
- Major-General Richard Philips Lee CB
- Major-General John Moore CB FRCVS
- Colonel Reginald Hoare DSO
- Colonel and Honorary Brigadier-General Richard Charles Bernard Lawrence CB
- Colonel and Honorary Major-General John Elford Dickie CB India
- Colonel and Honorary Brigadier-General James Evans
- Colonel John Vaughan CB DSO
- Colonel Charles William Brownlow DSO
- Lieutenant-Colonel and Brevet Colonel Richard Pigot Molesworth, Royal Artillery
- Colonel Arthur Ernest John Perkins CB
- Lieutenant-Colonel and Brevet Colonel Hugh Maude de Fellenberg Montgomery CB Royal Artillery
- Lieutenant-Colonel and Brevet Colonel Torquhil George Matheson CB Coldstream Guards
- Major and Brevet Colonel John Charteris DSO Royal Engineers
- Major and Brevet Colonel James Kilvington Cochrane, Leinster Regiment
- Major and Brevet Colonel Lewis Frederic Green-Wilkinson DSO
- Colonel Arthur Malcolm Tyler DSO
- Temp Colonel George Ernest Gask DSO FRCS Army Medical Service
- Temp Colonel Edwin Greenwood Hardy, Remt. Service
- Colonel John Poe DSO Army Medical Service
- Major and Brevet Colonel Cyril Norman Macmullen DSO 15th Sikhs, Indian Army
- Major and Brevet Colonel Ian Stewart DSO Scottish Rifles
- Rev. James Henry Davey, Royal Army Chaplains' Department
- Temp Colonel John Alexander Nixon FRCP Army Medical Service
- Temp Colonel William Errington Hume Army Medical Service
- Lieutenant-Colonel, and Brevet Colonel Claud Edward Charles Graham Charlton DSO Royal Artillery
- Lieutenant-Colonel and Brevet Colonel Leopold Charles Louds Oldfield DSO Royal Artillery
- Lieutenant-Colonel and Brevet Pol. Roger Henry Massie, Royal Artillery
- Lieutenant-Colonel and Brevet Colonel Henry William Newcombe DSO Royal Artillery
- Major and Brevet Colonel Spencer Edmund Hollond DSO Rifle Brigade
- Lieutenant-Colonel and Brevet Colonel Clive Gordon Pritchard DSO Royal Artillery
- Major and Brevet Colonel Ryves Alexander Mark Currie DSO Somerset Light Infantry
- Lieutenant-Colonel William Kitson Clayton TD Royal Army Medical Corps
- Lieutenant-Colonel Netterville Guy Barren DSO Royal Artillery
- Lieutenant-Colonel William Legh Palmer, Royal Engineers
- Lieutenant-Colonel Durie Parsons DSO Royal Army Service Corps
- Lieutenant-Colonel D'Arcy Legard DSO 17th Lancers
- Lieutenant-Colonel Alexander James MacDougall Royal Army Medical Corps
- Lieutenant-Colonel Henry Graham Martin, Royal Army Medical Corps
- Lieutenant-Colonel Standish de Couroy O'Grady DSO Royal Army Medical Corps
- Lieutenant-Colonel Henry Herrick DSO Royal Army Medical Corps
- Lieutenant-Colonel Horace Samson Roch DSO Royal Army Medical Corps
- Lieutenant-Colonel Allen Butler Gosset, Cheshire Regiment
- Lieutenant-Colonel Ronald Marr Johnson DSO Royal Artillery
- Lieutenant-Colonel William Loring DSO Royal Garrison Artillery
- Lieutenant-Colonel Geoffrey Nowell Salmon DSO Rifle Brigade
- Lieutenant-Colonel William George Thompson DSO Royal Artillery
- Lieutenant-Colonel George Tagore Mair DSO Royal Artillery
- Major and Brevet Lieutenant-Colonel Harry Biddulph DSO Royal Engineers
- Major and Brevet Lieutenant-Colonel Anthony Julian Reddie DSO South Wales Borderers
- Major and Brevet Lieutenant-Colonel Hector Gowans Reid DSO Royal Army Service Corps
- Major and Brevet Lieutenant-Colonel Reginald John Kentish DSO Royal Irish Fusiliers
- Lieutenant-Colonel George Despard Franks DSO 19th Hussars
- Lieutenant-Colonel Corlis St. Leger Gillman Hawkes DSO Royal Artillery
- Lieutenant-Colonel Hugh John Bartholomew DSO Worcestershire Regiment
- Lieutenant-Colonel Arthur Stedman Cotton DSO Royal Artillery
- Lieutenant-Colonel Charles St. Maur Ingham DSO Royal Artillery
- Lieutenant-Colonel Arthur Reginald, Wainewright DSO Royal Artillery
- Lieutenant-Colonel William Herman Frank Weber DSO Royal Artillery
- Lieutenant-Colonel Henry Valentine Bache de Satge DSO Royal Artillery
- Lieutenant-Colonel Courtenay Russell Kelly DSO Royal Artillery
- Major and Brevet Lieutenant-Colonel Bertie Drew Fisher DSO 17th Lancers
- Lieutenant-Colonel Charles Wallace Everett, Royal Army Ordnance Corps
- Temp Lieutenant-Colonel Henry Percy Mayhury CB Royal Engineers
- Lieutenant-Colonel John Halket Crawford, 32nd Lancers, Indian Army
- Lieutenant-Colonel William Stirling DSO Royal Artillery
- Lieutenant-Colonel Lord Esmé Charles Gordon-Lennox DSO MVO Scots Guards
- Major and Brevet Lieutenant-Colonel Edmund Davidson, Royal Army Ordnance Corps
- Major and Brevet Lieutenant-Colonel Hubert Conway Rees DSO Welsh Regiment
- Major and Brevet Lieutenant-Colonel Rosslewin Westropp Morgan DSO South Staffordshire Regiment
- Major and Brevet Lieutenant-Colonel Herbert Edmund Reginald Rubens Braine DSO Royal Munster Fusiliers
- Major and Brevet Lieutenant-Colonel Kenneth Gray Buchanan DSO Seaforth Highlanders
- Major and Brevet Lieutenant-Colonel William George Shedden Dobbie DSO Royal Engineers
- Lieutenant-Colonel Maxton Moore DSO Royal Army Service Corps
- Temp Lieutenant-Colonel Arthur Stephenson DSO MC Royal Scots
- Temp Honorary Lieutenant-Colonel Hugh Cabot, Royal Army Medical Corps
- Lieutenant-Colonel Harold Arthur David Richards DSO Royal Army Service Corps
- Temp Lieutenant-Colonel Ewen Allan Cameron DSO North Lancashire Regiment, attd. East Surrey Regiment
- Lieutenant-Colonel Francis Arthur Twiss DSO MVO Royal Artillery
- Lieutenant-Colonel Philip Joseph Paterson DSO Royal Artillery
- Temp Lieutenant-Colonel Norman MacLeod DSO Cameron Highlanders
- Lieutenant-Colonel William Mortimer Ogg DSO Royal Artillery
- Major and Brevet Lieutenant-Colonel Robert Gilmour Earle DSO Royal Engineers
- Major and Brevet Lieutenant-Colonel Paget Kernmis Betty DSO Royal Engineers
- Major and Brevet Lieutenant-Colonel Claud Furniss Potter DSO Royal Artillery
- Major and Brevet Lieutenant-Colonel Percy Hudson DSO Liverpool Regiment
- Major and Brevet Lieutenant-Colonel Henry Townsend Corbet Singleton DSO Highland Light Infantry
- Major and Brevet Lieutenant-Colonel George Charles Grazebrook DSO Royal Inniskilling Fusiliers
- Major and Brevet Lieutenant-Colonel Walter Pitts Hendy Hill DSO Royal Fusiliers
- Major and Brevet Lieutenant-Colonel Wilfrid Keith Evans DSO Manchester Regiment
- Major and Brevet Lieutenant-Colonel Percy Ryan Conway Commings DSO South Staffordshire Regiment
- Major and Brevet Lieutenant-Colonel Maurice Grove Taylor DSO Royal Engineers
- Major and Brevet Lieutenant-Colonel Denis John Charles Kirwan Bernard DSO Rifle Brigade
- Major and Brevet Lieutenant-Colonel Reginald Tilson Lee DSO Royal West Surrey Regiment
- Major and Brevet Lieutenant-Colonel Horace Walter Cobham DSO
- Lieutenant-Colonel Henry Ernest Singleton Wynne DSO Royal Artillery
- Lieutenant-Colonel Arthur Maxwell DSO London Regiment
- Lieutenant-Colonel William Melvill Warburton DSO Royal Artillery
- Temp Lieutenant-Colonel John Espenett Knott DSO Royal Inniskilling Fusiliers
- Lieutenant-Colonel Cecil Henry Pank DSO 8th Battalion, Middlesex Regiment
- Lieutenant-Colonel Austin Thorp DSO Royal Artillery (to date 29 October 1918.)
- Temp Lieutenant-Colonel George Henry Gater DSO Nottinghamshire and Derbyshire Regiment
- Temp Lieutenant-Colonel Edward Allen Wood DSO General List
- Lieutenant-Colonel John Beaumont Neilson DSO 5th Battalion, Highland Light Infantry
- Lieutenant-Colonel James Archibald Charteris Forsyth DSO Royal Artillery
- Major and Brevet Lieutenant-Colonel James Hubert Thomas Cornish-Bowden DSO Duke of Cornwall's Light Infantry
- Major and Brevet Lieutenant-Colonel Thomas Rose-Caradoc Price DSO Welsh Guards
- Major and Brevet Lieutenant-Colonel James Glendinning Browne DSO Royal Army Service Corps
- Major and Brevet Lieutenant-Colonel Herbert Tregosse Gwennap Moore DSO Royal Engineers
- Major and Brevet Lieutenant-Colonel Horace Somerville Sewell DSO 4th Dragoon Guards
- Major and Brevet Lieutenant-Colonel William Henry Traill DSO East Lancashire Regiment
- Major and Brevet Lieutenant-Colonel Charles William Macleod DSO Royal Army Service Corps
- Major and Brevet Lieutenant-Colonel Charles Bertie Owen Symons DSO Royal Engineers
- Major and Brevet Lieutenant-Colonel Reginald Francis Amhurst Butterworth DSO Royal Engineers
- Major and Brevet Lieutenant-Colonel Reginald Joseph Slaughter DSO Royal Army Service Corps
- Major and Brevet Lieutenant-Colonel Henry Charles Simpson DSO Royal Artillery
- Major and Brevet Lieutenant-Colonel George Francis Bennett Goldney DSO Royal Engineers
- Major and Brevet Lieutenant-Colonel Bertram Norman Sergison-Brooke DSO Grenadier Guards
- Major and Brevet Lieutenant-Colonel George de Someri Dudley, Royal Army Ordnance Corps
- Major and Brevet Lieutenant-Colonel Percy Wilson-Brown DSO Gordon Highlanders
- Major and Brevet Lieutenant-Colonel Thomas Thackeray Grove DSO Royal Engineers
- Major and Brevet Lieutenant-Colonel Schomberg Henley Eden DSO Royal Highlanders
- Major and Brevet Lieutenant-Colonel Guy Charles Williams DSO Royal Engineers
- Major and Brevet Lieutenant-Colonel John McDougall Haskard DSO Royal Dublin Fusiliers
- Major and Brevet Lieutenant-Colonel JosephRobert Wethered DSO Gloucestershire Regiment
- Major and Brevet Lieutenant-Colonel Austin Claude Girdwood DSO Northumberland Fusiliers
- Major and Brevet Lieutenant-Colonel Ronald Macclesfield Heath DSO Middlesex Regiment
- Major and Brevet Lieutenant-Colonel Edward Pius Arthur Riddell DSO Rifle Brigade
- Major and Brevet Lieutenant-Colonel James Lauderdale Gilbert Burnett DSO Gordon Highlanders
- Major and Brevet Lieutenant-Colonel Frank Godfrey Willan DSO King's Royal Rifle Corps
- Major and Brevet Lieutenant-Colonel Arthur Cecil Temperley DSO Norfolk Regiment
- Major and Brevet Lieutenant-Colonel Stuart Harman Joseph Thunder DSO MC Norton Regiment
- Major and Brevet Lieutenant-Colonel Hugh Marjoribanks Craigie Halkett DSO Highland Light Infantry
- Major and Brevet Lieutenant-Colonel Roland Luker MC Lancashire Fusiliers
- Major and Brevet Lieutenant-Colonel Adrian Beare Incledon-Webber DSO Royal Irish Fusiliers
- Major and Brevet Lieutenant-Colonel William Denman Croft DSO Scottish Rifles
- Major and Brevet Lieutenant-Colonel Francis Cecil Longbourne DSO Royal West Surrey Regiment
- Major and Brevet Lieutenant-Colonel Robert Francis Hurter Wallace, Royal Highlanders
- Temp Major and Brevet Lieutenant-Colonel Geoffrey Llewellyn Hinds Hpwell, Royal Army Service Corps
- Major and Brevet Lieutenant-Colonel Humphry Waugh Snow DSO Reserve of Officers, Royal West Kent Regiment
- Temp Lieutenant-Colonel William George Astell Ramsey-Fairfax DSO Tank Corps
- Lieutenant-Colonel Francis Leger Christian Livingstone-Learmonth, Royal Artillery (employed Royal Artillery)
- Lieutenant-Colonel Walliam Reid Glover DSO London Regiment
- Lieutenant-Colonel Edmund Farquhar St. John DSO Royal Artillery
- Temp Lieutenant-Colonel Cyril Montagu Luck DSO Royal Engineers
- Lieutenant-Colonel Edward James, Earl of Elgin and Kincardine, Royal Artillery
- Major Francis Fane Lambarde DSO
- Major Harold Charles Thoroton Hildyard DSO
- Major Harry Romer Lee DSO
- Major George Stuart Knox, Royal Engineers
- Major William Kelson Russell DSO Royal Engineers
- Lieutenant-Colonel Lancelot Richmond Beadon DSO Royal Army Service Corps
- Major Gilbert Claud Hamilton DSO Grenadier Guards
- Major Mervyn Meares DSO Royal Army Ordnance Corps
- Major Henry Alexander Boyd DSO Royal Artillery
- Temp Major Hubert StanleyWhitmore Pennington DSO Royal Army Service Corps
- Major William Murray Stewart DSO Cameron Highlanders
- Temp Major William Belfield, Royal Army Service Corps
- Major John Poole Bowring Robinson DSO Royal Dublin Fusiliers
- Major Rupert Caesar Smythe DSO Royal Inniskilling Fusiliers, attd. Royal Irish Rifles
- Major Lancelot Edward Seth Ward DSO Royal Artillery, Oxfordshire & Buckinghamshire Light Infantry
- Major Frederick George Skipwith, Labour Corps
- Temp Major Joseph Dalrymple OBE Royal Army Medical Corps
- Temp Major William Alfred Greenley DSO Royal Army Service Corps
- Major Duncan Grant-Dalton DSO West Yorkshire Regiment, employed 19th Battalion, Welsh Regiment
- Major John Inglis, Highland Light Infantry, employed Cameron Highlanders
- Major Alan Hamer Maude DSO Royal Army Service Corps
- Major Lawrence Chenevix-Trench DSO Royal Engineers
- Major Leopold Christian Duncan Jenner DSO
- Temp Major James Aubrey Smith, General List, employed Labour Corps
- Captain Hubert Conrad Sparks DSO MC London Regiment
- Captain and Brevet Major Edward Cuthbert de Renzy Martin DSO MC Yorkshire Light Infantry, attd. 11th Battalion, Lancashire Fusiliers
- Captain and Brevet Major William Henry Annesley DSO

Canadian Force

- Brigadier-General Charles Johnstone Armstrong CMG Canadian Engineers
- Brigadier-General Hugh Marshall Dyer CMG DSO Saskatchewan Regiment, Canadian Infantry
- Brigadier-General William Antrobus Griesbach CMG DSO Alberta Regiment, Canadian Infantry
- Brigadier-General Frederick William Hill CMG DSO West Ontario Regiment Canadian Infantry
- Brigadier-General James Howden MacBrien CMG DSO Royal Canadian Dragoons
- Brigadier-General Henri Alexandre Panet CMG DSO Royal Canadian Horse Artillery
- Brigadier-General John William Stewart CMG Canadian Railway Troops
- Brigadier-General John Munro Ross DSO British Columbia Regiment
- Brigadier-General Dennis Colburn Draper DSO Quebec Regiment
- Brigadier-General Daniel Mowat Ormond DSO Alberta Regiment
- Brigadier-General John Smith Stewart DSO Canadian Field Artillery
- Brigadier-General Alexander Ross DSO Saskatchewan Regiment
- Colonel Robert Percy Wright DSO Canadian Army Medical Corps
- Colonel Alexander MacPhail DSO Royal Canadian Engineers
- Major and Brevet Lieutenant-Colonel William Beaumont Anderson DSO Royal Canadian Engineers
- Lieutenant-Colonel Herbert John Dawson DSO Saskatchewan Regiment
- Lieutenant-Colonel Archibald de Mowbray Bell, Canadian Army Service Corps
- Lieutenant-Colonel Spurgeon Campbell, Canadian Army Medical Corps
- Lieutenant-Colonel William Robert Bertram DSO Manitoba Regiment
- Lieutenant-Colonel Stratton Harry Osier DSO Royal Canadian Engineers
- Lieutenant-Colonel Johnson Lindsey Rowlett Parsons DSO Saskatchewan Regiment
- Major Kenric Rud Marshall DSO Central Ontario Regiment
- Lieutenant-Colonel John Franklin Kidd, Canadian Army Medical Corps

Australian Force

- Colonel Julius Henry Bruche CMG General List, Australian Imperial Force
- Colonel Walter Ramsay McNicoll CMG DSO General List, Australian Imperial Force
- Colonel Walter Adams Coxen CMG DSO General List, Australian Imperial Force
- Colonel Cecil Henry Foott CMG General List, Australian Imperial Force

For valuable services rendered in connection with Military Operations in Egypt:

- Lieutenant-Colonel and Brevet Colonel Robert Seymour Vandeleur CMG Seaforth Highlanders
- Lieutenant-Colonel and Brevet Colonel Edmund Merritt Morris CMG Royal Lancaster Regiment
- Lieutenant-Colonel Arthur Henry Orlando Lloyd CMG MVO Shropshire Yeomanry
- Temp Lieutenant-Colonel Herbert Lightfoot Eason CMG Royal Army Medical Corps
- Major Charles Philip Scudamore CMG DSO late Royal Scots Fusiliers

For valuable services rendered in connection with Military Operations in Italy:

- Colonel Thomas Roe Christopher Hudson, Royal Artillery
- Lieutenant-Colonel and Brevet Colonel Herbert Gordon CMG DSO Leicestershire Regiment
- Major and Brevet Colonel Henry Lethbridge Alexander DSO Dorsetshire Regiment
- Lieutenant-Colonel and Brevet Colonel John Arkwright Strick DSO Shropshire Light Infantry

For valuable services rendered in connection with Military Operations in Salonika:

- Lieutenant-Colonel and Brevet-Colonel Robert Hugh Hare CMG MVO DSO Royal Artillery
- Lieutenant-Colonel and Brevet, Colonel Henry Edward Theodore Kelly CMG Royal Artillery
- Colonel Fitzpatrick Eassie CMG DSO Royal Army Veterinary Corps
- Temp Colonel Arthur George Phear FRCP
- Major and Brevet Lieutenant-Colonel Francis Stewart Montague-Bates CMG DSO East Surrey Regiment
- Captain and Brevet Major Robert Ernest Kelly, Royal Army Medical Corps

For valuable services rendered in connection with Military Operations in North Russia:

- Major and Brevet Lieutenant-Colonel Charles Clarkson Martin Maynard CMG DSO Devonshire Regiment

Royal Air Force

- Major-General Edward Leonard Ellington CMG
- Major-General William Geoffrey Hanson Salmond DSO
- Major-General Richard Cleveland Munday MRCS LRCP
- Colonel Philip Woolcott Game DSO
- Colonel Oliver Swann
- Colonel Francis Rowland Scarlett DSO
- Colonel Lionel Evelyn Oswald Charlton CMG DSO
- Lieutenant-Colonel John Glanville Hearson DSO

==== Civil Division ====
- Rear-Admiral Arthur David Ricardo
- Rear-Admiral Robert John Prendergast
- Engineer Rear-Admiral William George Mogg
- Engineer Rear-Admiral George William Hudson
- Captain Ronald Arthur Hopwood RN
- Captain Wentworth Henry Davies Margesson RN
- Captain Alexander Lowndes RN
- Lieutenant-Colonel Charles Louis Brooke, Royal Marine Artillery
- Engineer Captain John Harry Jenkin RN
- Engineer Captain John McLaurin RN
- Surgeon-Captain Walter Godfrey Axford RN
- Surgeon-Captain Arthur Stanley Nance RN
- Paymaster Commander Graham Hewlett RN
- Paymaster Commander Alfred Ramsey Parker RN
- Paymaster Commander Philip John Hawkins Lander Row RN
- Paymaster Commander Henry Wilfred Eldon Manisty CMG RN
- Paymaster Commander Ernest Walsham Charles Thring RN
- Major and Brevet Colonel Richard ffolliott Willis, Royal Marine Light Infantry
- Lieutenant-Colonel and Brevet-Colonel George Frend, Commanding 3rd Battalion (Reserve), The Prince of Wales's Own (West Yorkshire Regiment)
- Colonel William Alexander Mellis VD DL Chairman, Aberdeenshire Territorial Force Association
- Colonel Sir Francis Douglas Blake Bt DL Vice-Chairman, Northumberland Territorial Force Association
- Colonel Robert Oliver Lloyd DL Chairman, Pembrokeshire Territorial Force Association
- Major Henry Reeves Parkes, Unattached Last, Territorial Force, Secretary, West Lancashire Territorial Force Association
- Colonel Sir Thomas Henry, Marquess of Bath KG TD HM Lieutenant for the County of Somerset, President, Somersetshire Territorial Force Association
- Major Frederick William Peacock TD DL Chairman, Derbyshire Territorial Force Association
- Edward Hall Alderson, Clerk Assistant at the Table, House of Lords
- Cyril Ernest Ashford, Headmaster, Royal Naval College, Dartmouth, also Adviser on Education to the Admiralty
- Percy Walter Llewellyn Ashley, Assistant Secretary (Department of Industries and Manufactures), Board of Trade
- Robert Reid Bannatyne, Assistant Secretary, Home Office
- Wilberforce Ross Barker, Assistant Secretary, Board of Education
- Edmund Bourke, Commissioner, Irish Local Government Board
- Harold Edward Dale, Assistant Secretary, Board of Agriculture
- John Colin Campbell Davidson, Private Secretary to the Chancellor of the Exchequer
- Edmund Alderson Sandford Fawcett, Secretary, Ministry of National Service
- Michael Heseltine, Assistant Secretary, Ministry of Reconstruction
- Richard Valentine Nind Hopkins, Commissioner and Secretary, Inland Revenue
- Charles Fraser Adair Hore, Assistant Secretary, Ministry of Munitions
- Andrew Philip Magill, Registrar of Petty Sessions Clerks, Ireland. Lately Private Secretary to Irish Office
- Ernest Grant Moggridge, Assistant Secretary (Railway Department), Board of Trade
- The Honourable Frank Trevor Bigham, Assistant Commissioner, New Scotland Yard
- William Archdale Bland, Principal Clerk, War Office, lent to Air Ministry as Assistant Financial Secretary
- Lawrence George Brock, Assistant Secretary, National Health Insurance Commission
- Harold Beresford Butler, Assistant Secretary, Ministry of Labour
- Frank Herbert Coller, Assistant Secretary, Ministry of Food
- Brigadier-General Archibald Samuel Cooper CMG Director of Inland Waterways and Docks
- George Herbert Duckworth, Ministry of Munitions
- Captain The Honourable Evelyn FitzGerald, Private Secretary to the Quartermaster-General, War Office
- Ernest Julian Foley, Director of Military Sea Transport, Admiralty
- Captain Clement Jones, Assistant Secretary, War Cabinet
- Cecil Hermann Kisch, Private Secretary to the Secretary of State, India Office
- Robert Bruce Low Assistant Medical Officer, Local Government Board (retired)
- The Honourable Francis Oswald Lindley CBE Counsellor to His Britannic Majesty's Embassy, Petrograd
- Frederick Henry McLeod, Commissioner of Trade Exemptions, Ministry of National Service
- Alexander William Monro, Private Secretary to the President, Board of Agriculture and Fisheries
- Francis Hamer Oates, Private Secretary to the President, Board of Education
- Henry Howard Piggott CBE Assistant Secretary, Ministry of Munitions
- Edward Raven, Assistant Secretary, General Post Office
- John Lindsay Robertson Senior Chief Inspector of Schools, Scotland
- Lieutenant-Colonel Lancelot Starr, Assistant Secretary, War Cabinet
- Philip George Lancelot Webb, Deputy Controller, Petrol Control Department
- Victor Alexander Augustus Henry Wellesley, Controller of Commercial and Consular Service, Foreign Office
- Edward Frank Wise, Assistant Secretary, Ministry of Food

== The Most Exalted Order of the Star of India ==
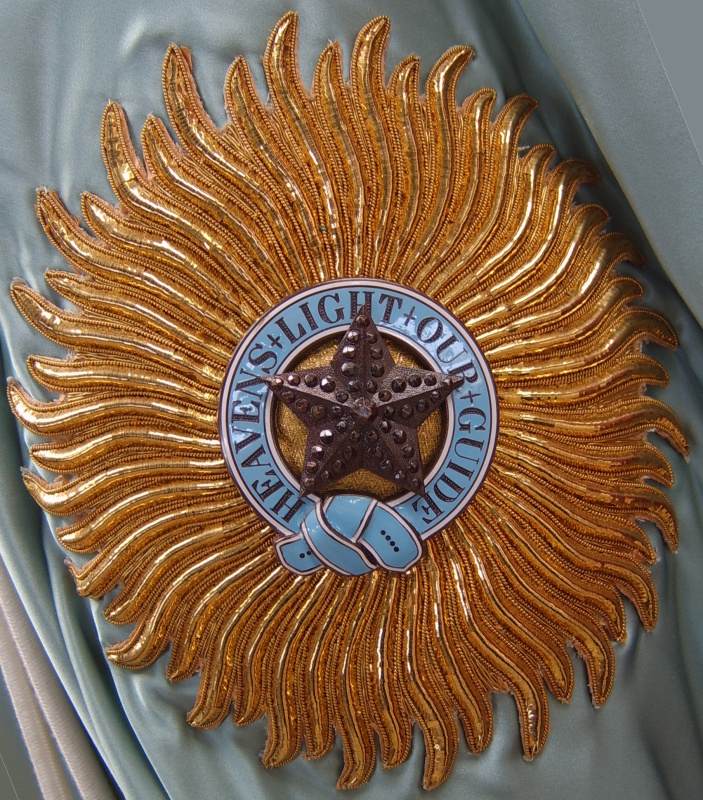
Star of a Knight Grand Commander of the Most Exalted Order of the Star of India

=== Knight Commander (KCSI) ===
- Oswald Vivian Bosanquet CSI CIE Indian Civil Service, Agent to the Governor-General in Central India

=== Companion (CSI) ===
- Hugh McPherson, Indian Civil Service, Chief Secretary to the Government of Bihar and Orissa
- Henry Fraser Howard CIE Indian Civil Service, Secretary to the Government of India, Finance Department
- Heniy Hubert Hayden CIE Director, Geological Survey of India
- Lieutenant-Colonel Herbert Des Voeux. Inspector-General of Police, Burma

== The Most Distinguished Order of Saint Michael and Saint George ==
Star of the Order of Saint Michael and Saint George.

=== Knight Grand Cross of the Order of St Michael and St George (GCMG) ===
- Vice-Admiral The Honourable Sir Somerset Arthur Gough-Calthorpe KCB CVO
- Vice-Admiral Sir Montague Edward Browning KCB MVO
- Vice-Admiral Sir John Michael de Robeck KCB

Canadian Forces

- Lieutenant-General Sir Arthur William Currie KCB KCMG

Australian Forces

- Major-General Sir John Monash KCB VD

=== Knight Commander of the Order of St Michael and St George (KCMG) ===
- Colonel Charles Delme-Radcliffe CB CMG CVO
- Major-General George Tom Molesworth Bridges CB CMG DSO
- Major-General William Watson Pike CMG DSO FRCSI Army Medical Service
- Temp Colonel John Atkins CMG FRCS Army Medical Service
- Major-General Gerald Francis Ellison CMG
- Major-General Herbert Francis, Lord Cheylesmore KCVO
- Major-General Frederick William Bainbridge Landon CB
- Major-General Robert Arundel Kerr Montgomery CB DSO
- Major-General Henry Ernest Stanton CB DSO
- Robert Thorne Coryndon CMG Governor and Commander-in-Chief of the Uganda Protectorate
- The Right Honourable William Frederick Lloyd KC DCL Prime Minister of Newfoundland
- The Honourable Henry Bruce Lefroy CMG Premier of the State of Western Australia
- Henry Charles Miller Lambert CB Assistant Under Secretary of State for the Colonies, and Secretary to the Imperial Conference
- Francis James Newton CMG CVO Treasurer of Southern Rhodesia
- Percy Charles Hugh Wyndham, His Majesty's Envoy Extraordinary and Minister Plenipotentiary to the Republic of Colombia
- Sir Francis Oppenheimer Kt Commercial Attaché and Acting Counsellor of Embassy in His Majesty's Diplomatic Service
- Harry Harling Lamb CMG Consul-General in His Majesty's Consular Service in the Levant
- Vice-Admiral Sir Hugh Evan-Thomas KCB MVO
- Vice-Admiral Sir William Christopher Pakenham KCB KCVO
- Rear-Admiral Francis Fitzgerald Haworth-Booth CMG
- Rear-Admiral Allan Frederic Everett CB
- Engineer Rear-Admiral Henry Humphreys CB
- Surgeon Rear-Admiral George Welch CB
- Major-General John Frederic Daniell CMG Royal Marine Light Infantry

Australian Forces

- Major-General Cyril Brudenell Bingham White CB CMG DSO ADC
- Major-General Sir Joseph John Talbot Hobbs KCB VD

For services rendered in connection with Military Operations in Egypt:

- Major-General John Stuart Mackenzie Shea CB CMG DSO
- General Sydenham Campbell Urquhart Smith CB

For valuable services rendered in connection with Military Operations in Salonika:

- Colonel Henry Joseph Everett CB CMG
- Lieutenant-General Sir George Francis Milne KCB DSO

=== Companion of the Order of St Michael and St George (CMG) ===
- Colonel George Frederick Colin Campbell VD Secretary to the Treasury, Receiver-General and Paymaster-General, Dominion of New Zealand
- Claude Ambrose Cardew, District Resident, First Grade, Nyasaland Protectorate
- Leslie Couper, Member of the West African Currency Board
- John James Dent, Member of the Committee of Management of the Emigrants Information Office
- James Fraser MInstCE Chief Commissioner for Railways and Tramways, State of New South Wales
- William Frederick Gowers, Resident of Kano, Nigeria
- Wilfrid Edward Francis Jackson, Colonial Secretary of the Bermudas or Homers Islands
- Merton King, Resident Commissioner, The New Hebrides
- William Russell Morris ISO Secretary, Post and Telegraph Department, Dominion of New Zealand
- Aylmer Cavendish Pearson, Governor of the State of North Borneo
- William Charles Fleming Robertson, Colonial Secretary of Gibraltar, and Acting Lieutenant-Governor and Chief Secretary to Government, Malta
- Frank Tate ISO Director of Education in the State of Victoria
- Henry Arthur Cooke, Commercial Attaché in His Majesty's Diplomatic Service
- Alexander Telford Waugh, Commercial Attaché to His Majesty's Legation at Athens and Consul in His Majesty's Consular Service in the Levant
- John Thomas Pratt, His Majesty's Consul at Jinan, China
- Rear-Admiral Cecil Frederick Dampier
- Lieutenant-Colonel and Brevet Colonel St. George Bewes Armstrong, Royal Marine Light Infantry
- Captain Alexander Farrington
- Captain Montagu William Warcop Peter Consett
- Captain Cecil Maxwell-Lefroy
- Captain Arthur Kenneth Macrorie MVO
- Captain Charles William Bruton
- Captain Alldin Usborne Moore
- Captain Arthur Edmund Wood
- Captain Lockhart Leith DSO
- Captain Gilbert Owen Stephenson
- Captain John Lewis Pearson
- Captain Wilfred Franklin French
- Commander Sidney Richard Olivier
- Acting Captain Henry Albert le Fowne Hurt
- Engineer Captain Sydney Rider
- Lieutenant-Colonel Picton Phillipps MVO Royal Marine Artillery
- Engineer Commander Richard Barns Morison
- Commander Edward James Headlam DSO
- Engineer Commander Horace George Summerford
- Engineer Commander Arthur Edward Hyne
- Surgeon Commander Robert Dundonald Jameson
- Surgeon Commander Hugh Somerville Burniston
- Acting Paymaster Commander John Cogswell Boardman
- Major Arthur Peel, Royal Marine Light Infantry
- Major-General Richard Bannatine-Allason CB
- Major-General Herman James Shelley Landon CB
- Colonel Thomas Stock, late Essex Regiment
- Lieutenant-Colonel and Brevet Colonel Arthur Robert Austen, late Shropshire Light Infantry
- Colonel Robert Scott-Kerr CB DSO MVO
- Colonel Edward Agar, late Royal Engineers
- Colonel Sydney Charles Fishburn Jackson DSO late Hampshire Regiment
- Colonel Lionel Dorling CB DSO Army Pay Department
- Colonel Reginald Stewart Oxley CB
- Colonel James Aubrey Gibbon
- Colonel Donald Guy Prendergast
- Colonel Hugh Duncan Lawrence
- Colonel Anthony Hudson Woodifield OBE Royal Army Ordnance Corps
- Lieutenant-Colonel and Brevet Colonel Alan Hinde, Royal Artillery
- Lieutenant-Colonel and Brevet Colonel Robert William Hare DSO Norfolk Regiment
- Lieutenant-Colonel and Brevet Colonel Lancelot Machell Wilson DSO Royal Artillery
- Lieutenant-Colonel and Brevet Colonel Ralph Henry Carr-Ellison, late 1st Dragoons
- Major and Brevet Colonel Richard Alexander Steel CIE Indian Army
- Lieutenant-Colonel Edward St. Aubyn Wake, late Indian Army
- Lieutenant-Colonel The Honourable Walter Dashwood Sclater-Booth CB DSO
- Lieutenant-Colonel Lewis Iggulden Backhouse Hulke, East Kent Regiment
- Lieutenant-Colonel Robert John Byford Mair, Royal Engineers
- Lieutenant-Colonel Reginald George Munn, 36th Sikhs, Indian Army
- Major and Brevet Lieutenant-Colonel William Samuel Anthony, Royal Army Veterinary Corps
- Major and Brevet Lieutenant-Colonel Oswald Kesteven Chance DSO 5th Lancers
- Major and Brevet Lieutenant-Colonel Herbert Watkins Grubb DSO Border Regiment
- Lieutenant-Colonel Gerald Richard Vivian Kinsman DSO Royal Artillery
- Major and Brevet Lieutenant-Colonel George Alfred Travels, late Royal Engineers
- Major and Brevet Lieutenant-Colonel Julian Lawrence Fisher DSO Royal Fusiliers
- Major and Brevet Lieutenant-Colonel Eric Edward Boketon Holt-Wilson DSO late Royal Engineers
- Major and Brevet Lieutenant-Colonel Edmund Byam Mathew-Lannowe DSO Royal West Surrey Regiment
- Major and Brevet Lieutenant-Colonel Llewelyn Evans DSO Royal Engineers
- Major and Brevet Lieutenant-Colonel Wilfrid Wykeham Jelf DSO Royal Artillery
- Major and Brevet Lieutenant-Colonel Josslyn Vere Ramsden DSO Royal Artillery
- Major and Brevet Lieutenant-Colonel John James Aitkin DSO Royal Army Veterinary Corps
- Major and Brevet Lieutenant-Colonel Ernest Hewlett DSO Devonshire Regiment
- Major and Brevet Lieutenant-Colonel The Honourable Maurice Charles Andrew Drummond DSO Royal Highlanders
- Major Algernon Forbes Randolph DSO late Middlesex Regiment
- Major Gerald Walton Hobson DSO late 12th Lancers
- Major Ion Richard Staveley Shinkwin DSO Royal Army Service Corps
- Major Thomas Bernard Arthur Leahy, Royal Army Ordnance Corps
- Major Herbert Laurence Wethered DSO Royal Army Ordnance Corps
- Temp Major Arthur Tilson Shaen Magan, Royal Army Service Corps
- Captain and Brevet Major Alfred Searle Head FRCVS Royal Army Veterinary Corps
- Major Charles Edward Willes, 3rd (R.) Battalion, Royal Welsh Fusiliers
- Temp Major Vere Brabazon Ponsonby, Viscount Duncannon
- Colonel Edward Maitland Maitland DSO
- Colonel Harold Douglas Briggs
- Colonel The Honourable Arthur Stopford
- Colonel Rudolph Edward Trower Hogg CIE
- Colonel Hugh Caswall Tremenheere Dowding
- Colonel Eugene Louis Gerrard DSO
- Lieutenant-Colonel Thomas Charles Reginald Higgins
- Lieutenant-Colonel Philip Lee William Herbert
- Lieutenant-Colonel Cyril Louis Norton Newall
- Lieutenant-Colonel Robert Gordon DSO
- Lieutenant-Colonel Bertie Harold Olivier Armstrong
- Lieutenant-Colonel Andrew George Board DSO
- Lieutenant-Colonel Felton Vesey Holt DSO
- Lieutenant-Colonel Kennedy Gerard Brooke
- Lieutenant-Colonel Philip Bennet Joubert de la Ferté DSO
- Lieutenant-Colonel Norman Duckworth Kerr MacEwen DSO
- Lieutenant-Colonel Gerard Robert Addison Holmes OBE
- Lieutenant-Colonel Percival Kinnear Wise DSO
- Lieutenant-Colonel Archibald Christie DSO
- Lieutenant-Colonel Arthur Wellesley Bigsworth DSO
- Lieutenant-Colonel Evelyn Boscawen Gordon DSO
- Lieutenant-Colonel Reginald John Armes
- Lieutenant-Colonel Ivo Arthur Exley Edwards
- Lieutenant-Colonel Hugh Alexander Williamson
- Lieutenant-Colonel Arthur Lowthian Godman DSO
- Lieutenant-Colonel Arthur Vere Bettington
- Lieutenant-Colonel Bertram Charles Fellows
- Lieutenant-Colonel Geoffrey Teale Brierley DSO
- Lieutenant-Colonel Malcolm Graham Christie DSO MC
- Lieutenant-Colonel Tom Dark Mackie OBE

Canadian Forces

- Colonel Hugh A. Chisholm, Canadian Army Medical Corps
- Lieutenant-Colonel William Amor Simson DSO Canadian Army Service Corps
- Lieutenant-Colonel Alfred Cecil Critchley DSO Canadian Cavalry
- Lieutenant-Colonel Karl Creighton Folger DSO Canadian Ordnance Corps

Australian Forces

- Colonel Herbert Brayley Collett DSO VD General List, Australian Imperial Force
- Colonel William Walter Russell Watson, General List, Australian Imperial Force
- Temp Colonel Charles Snodgrass Ryan, Australian Army Medical Corps
- Lieutenant-Colonel Frank Marshall, Australian Army Medical Corps

New Zealand Force

- Colonel Eugene Joseph O'Neill DSO FRCS New Zealand Medical Corps

For services rendered in connection with military operations in France and Flanders:

- Major-General Reginald Ulick Henry Buckland CB
- Major-General Richard Philips Lee CB
- Major-General John Moore CB FRCVS
- Colonel Reginald Hoare DSO
- Colonel and Honorary Brigadier-General Richard Charles Bernard Lawrence CB
- Colonel and Honorary Major-General John Elford Dickie CB India
- Colonel and Honorary Brigadier-General James Evans
- Colonel John Vaughan CB DSO
- Colonel Charles William Brownlow DSO
- Lieutenant-Colonel and Brevet Colonel Richard Pigot Molesworth, Royal Artillery
- Colonel Arthur Ernest John Perkins CB
- Lieutenant-Colonel and Brevet Colonel Hugh Maude de Fellenberg Montgomery CB Royal Artillery
- Lieutenant-Colonel and Brevet Colonel Torquhil George Matheson CB Coldstream Guards
- Major and Brevet Colonel John Charteris DSO Royal Engineers
- Major and Brevet Colonel James Kilvington Cochrane, Leinster Regiment
- Major and Brevet Colonel Lewis Frederic Green-Wilkinson DSO
- Colonel Arthur Malcolm Tyler DSO
- Temp Colonel George Ernest Gask DSO FRCS Army Medical Service
- Temp Colonel Edwin Greenwood Hardy, Remount Service
- Colonel John Poe DSO Army Medical Service
- Major and Brevet Colonel Cyril Norman MacMullen DSO 15th Sikhs, Indian Army
- Major and Brevet Colonel Ian Stewart DSO Scottish Rifles
- Rev. James Henry Davey, Royal Army Chaplains' Department
- Temp Colonel John Alexander Nixon FRCP Army Medical Service
- Temp Colonel William Errington Hume Army Medical Service
- Lieutenant-Colonel and Brevet Colonel Claud Edward Charles Graham Charlton DSO Royal Artillery
- Lieutenant-Colonel and Brevet Colonel Leopold Charles Louis Oldfield DSO Royal Artillery
- Lieutenant-Colonel and Brevet Colonel Roger Henry Massie, Royal Artillery
- Lieutenant-Colonel and Brevet Colonel Henry William Newcombe DSO Royal Artillery
- Major and Brevet Colonel Spencer Edmund Hollond DSO Rifle Brigade
- Lieutenant-Colonel and Brevet Colonel Clive Gordon Pritchard DSO Royal Artillery
- Major and Brevet Colonel Ryves Alexander Mark Currie DSO Somerset Light Infantry
- Lieutenant-Colonel William Kitson Clayton TD Royal Army Medical Corps
- Lieutenant-Colonel Netterville Guy Barron DSO Royal Artillery
- Lieutenant-Colonel William Legh Palmer, Royal Engineers
- Lieutenant-Colonel Durie Parsons DSO Royal Army Service Corps
- Lieutenant-Colonel D'Arcy Legard DSO 17th Lancers
- Lieutenant-Colonel Alexander James MacDougall Royal Army Medical Corps
- Lieutenant-Colonel Henry Graham Martin, Royal Army Medical Corps
- Lieutenant-Colonel Standish de Courcy O'Grady DSO Royal Army Medical Corps
- Lieutenant-Colonel Henry Herrick DSO Royal Army Medical Corps
- Lieutenant-Colonel Horace Samson Roch DSO Royal Army Medical Corps
- Lieutenant-Colonel Allen Butler Gosset, Cheshire Regiment
- Lieutenant-Colonel Ronald Marr Johnson DSO Royal Artillery
- Lieutenant-Colonel William Loring DSO Royal Garrison Artillery
- Lieutenant-Colonel Geoffrey Nowell Salmon DSO Rifle Brigade
- Lieutenant-Colonel William George Thompson DSO Royal Artillery
- Lieutenant-Colonel George Tagore Mair DSO Royal Artillery
- Major and Brevet Lieutenant-Colonel Harry Biddulph DSO Royal Engineers
- Major and Brevet Lieutenant-Colonel Anthony Julian Reddie DSO South Wales Borderers
- Major and Brevet Lieutenant-Colonel Hector Gowans Reid DSO Royal Army Service Corps
- Major and Brevet Lieutenant-Colonel Reginald John Kentish DSO Royal Irish Fusiliers
- Lieutenant-Colonel George Despard Franks DSO 19th Hussars
- Lieutenant-Colonel Corlis St. Leger Gillman Hawkes DSO Royal Artillery
- Lieutenant-Colonel Hugh John Bartholomew DSO Worcestershire Regiment
- Lieutenant-Colonel Arthur Stedman Cotton DSO Royal Artillery
- Lieutenant-Colonel Charles St. Maur Ingham DSO Royal Artillery
- Lieutenant-Colonel Arthur Reginald Wainewright DSO Royal Artillery
- Lieutenant-Colonel William Herman Frank Weber DSO Royal Artillery
- Lieutenant-Colonel Henry Valentine Bache de Satgé DSO Royal Artillery
- Lieutenant-Colonel Courtenay Russell Kelly DSO Royal Artillery
- Major and Brevet Lieutenant-Colonel Bertie Drew Fisher DSO 17th Lancers
- Lieutenant-Colonel Charles Wallace Everett, Royal Army Ordnance Corps
- Temp Lieutenant-Colonel Henry Maybury CB Royal Engineers
- Lieutenant-Colonel John Halket Crawford, 32nd Lancers, Indian Army
- Lieutenant-Colonel William Stirling DSO Royal Artillery
- Lieutenant-Colonel Lord Esmé Charles Gordon-Lennox DSO MVO Scots Guards
- Major and Brevet Lieutenant-Colonel Edmund Davidson, Royal Army Ordnance Corps
- Major and Brevet Lieutenant-Colonel Hubert Conway Rees DSO Welsh Regiment
- Major and Brevet Lieutenant-Colonel Rosslewin Westropp Morgan DSO South Staffordshire Regiment
- Major and Brevet Lieutenant-Colonel Herbert Edmund Reginald Rubens Braine DSO Royal Munster Fusiliers
- Major and Brevet Lieutenant-Colonel Kenneth Gray Buchanan DSO Seaforth Highlanders
- Major and Brevet Lieutenant-Colonel William George Shedden Dobbie DSO Royal Engineers
- Lieutenant-Colonel Maxton Moore DSO Royal Army Service Corps
- Temp Lieutenant-Colonel Arthur Stephenson DSO MC Royal Scots
- Temp Honorary Lieutenant-Colonel Hugh Cabot, Royal Army Medical Corps
- Lieutenant-Colonel Harold Arthur David Richards DSO Royal Army Service Corps
- Temp Lieutenant-Colonel Ewen Allan Cameron DSO North Lancashire Regiment, attd. East Surrey Regiment
- Lieutenant-Colonel Francis Arthur Twiss DSO MVO Royal Artillery
- Lieutenant-Colonel Philip Joseph Paterson DSO Royal Artillery
- Temp Lieutenant-Colonel Norman MacLeod DSO Cameron Highlanders
- Lieutenant-Colonel William Mortimer Ogg DSO Royal Artillery
- Major and Brevet Lieutenant-Colonel Robert Gilmour Earle DSO Royal Engineers
- Major and Brevet Lieutenant-Colonel Paget Kemmis Betty DSO Royal Engineers
- Major and Brevet Lieutenant-Colonel Claud Furniss Potter DSO Royal Artillery
- Major and Brevet Lieutenant-Colonel Percy Hudson DSO Liverpool Regiment
- Major and Brevet Lieutenant-Colonel Henry Townsend Corbet Singleton DSO Highland Light Infantry
- Major and Brevet Lieutenant-Colonel George Charles Grazebrook DSO Royal Inniskilling Fusiliers
- Major and Brevet Lieutenant-Colonel Walter Pitts Hendy Hill DSO Royal Fusiliers
- Major and Brevet Lieutenant-Colonel Wilfred Keith Evans DSO Manchester Regiment
- Major and Brevet Lieutenant-Colonel Percy Ryan Conway Commings DSO South Staffordshire Regiment
- Major and Brevet Lieutenant-Colonel Maurice Grove Taylor DSO Royal Engineers
- Major and Brevet Lieutenant-Colonel Denis John Charles Kirwan Bernard DSO Rifle Brigade
- Major and Brevet Lieutenant-Colonel Reginald Tilson Lee DSO Royal West Surrey Regiment
- Major and Brevet Lieutenant-Colonel Horace Walter Cobham DSO
- Lieutenant-Colonel Henry Ernest Singleton Wynne DSO Royal Artillery
- Lieutenant-Colonel Arthur Maxwell DSO London Regiment
- Lieutenant-Colonel William Melvill Warburton DSO Royal Artillery
- Temp Lieutenant-Colonel John Espenett Knott DSO Royal Inniskilling Fusiliers
- Lieutenant-Colonel Cecil Henry Pank DSO 8th Battalion, Middlesex Regiment
- Lieutenant-Colonel Austin Thorp DSO Royal Artillery (to date 29 October 1918.)
- Temp Lieutenant-Colonel George Henry Gater DSO Nottinghamshire and Derbyshire Regiment
- Temp Lieutenant-Colonel Edward Allan Wood DSO General List
- Lieutenant-Colonel John Beaumont Neilson DSO 5th Battalion, Highland Light Infantry
- Lieutenant-Colonel James Archibald Charteris Forsyth DSO Royal Artillery
- Major and Brevet Lieutenant-Colonel James Hubert Thomas Cornish-Bowden DSO Duke of Cornwall's Light Infantry
- Major and Brevet Lieutenant-Colonel Thomas Rose Caradoc Price DSO Welsh Guards
- Major and Brevet Lieutenant-Colonel James Glendinning Browne DSO Royal Army Service Corps
- Major and Brevet Lieutenant-Colonel Herbert Tregosse Gwennap Moore DSO Royal Engineers
- Major and Brevet Lieutenant-Colonel Horace Somerville Sewell DSO 4th Dragoon Guards
- Major and Brevet Lieutenant-Colonel William Henry Traill DSO East Lancashire Regiment
- Major and Brevet Lieutenant-Colonel Charles William Macleod DSO Royal Army Service Corps
- Major and Brevet Lieutenant-Colonel Charles Bertie Owen Symons DSO Royal Engineers
- Major and Brevet Lieutenant-Colonel Reginald Francis Amhurst Butterworth DSO Royal Engineers
- Major and Brevet Lieutenant-Colonel Reginald Joseph Slaughter DSO Royal Army Service Corps
- Major and Brevet Lieutenant-Colonel Henry Charles Simpson DSO Royal Artillery
- Major and Brevet Lieutenant-Colonel George Francis Bennett Goldney DSO Royal Engineers
- Major and Brevet Lieutenant-Colonel Bertram Norman Sergison-Brooke DSO Grenadier Guards
- Major and Brevet Lieutenant-Colonel George de Someri Dudley, Royal Army Ordnance Corps
- Major and Brevet Lieutenant-Colonel Percy Wilson Brown DSO Gordon Highlanders
- Major and Brevet Lieutenant-Colonel Thomas Thackeray Grove DSO Royal Engineers
- Major and Brevet Lieutenant-Colonel Schomberg Henley Eden DSO Royal Highlanders
- Major and Brevet Lieutenant-Colonel Guy Charles Williams DSO Royal Engineers
- Major and Brevet Lieutenant-Colonel John McDougall Haskard DSO Royal Dublin Fusiliers
- Major and Brevet Lieutenant-Colonel Joseph Robert Wethered DSO Gloucestershire Regiment
- Major and Brevet Lieutenant-Colonel Austin Claude Girdwood DSO Northumberland Fusiliers
- Major and Brevet Lieutenant-Colonel Ronald Macclesfield Heath DSO Middlesex Regiment
- Major and Brevet Lieutenant-Colonel Edward Pius Arthur Riddell DSO Rifle Brigade
- Major and Brevet Lieutenant-Colonel James Lauderdale Gilbert Burnett DSO Gordon Highlanders
- Major and Brevet Lieutenant-Colonel Frank Godfrey Willan DSO King's Royal Rifle Corps
- Major and Brevet Lieutenant-Colonel Arthur Cecil Temperley DSO Norfolk Regiment
- Major and Brevet Lieutenant-Colonel Stuart Harman Joseph Thunder DSO MC Norton Regiment
- Major and Brevet Lieutenant-Colonel Hugh Marjoribanks Craigie Halkett DSO Highland Light Infantry
- Major and Brevet Lieutenant-Colonel Roland Luker MC Lancashire Fusiliers
- Major and Brevet Lieutenant-Colonel Adrian Beare Incledon-Webber DSO Royal Irish Fusiliers
- Major and Brevet Lieutenant-Colonel William Denman Croft DSO Scottish Rifles
- Major and Brevet Lieutenant-Colonel Francis Cecil Longbourne DSO Royal West Surrey Regiment
- Major and Brevet Lieutenant-Colonel Robert Francis Hurter Wallace, Royal Highlanders
- Temp Major and Brevet Lieutenant-Colonel Geoffrey Llewellyn Hinds Howell, Royal Army Service Corps
- Major and Brevet Lieutenant-Colonel Humphry Waugh Snow DSO Reserve of Officers, Royal West Kent Regiment
- Temp Lieutenant-Colonel William George Astell Ramsay-Fairfax DSO Tank Corps
- Lieutenant-Colonel Francis Leger Christian Livingstone-Learmonth, Royal Artillery (employed Royal Artillery)
- Lieutenant-Colonel William Reid Glover DSO London Regiment
- Lieutenant-Colonel Edmund Farquhar St. John DSO Royal Artillery
- Temp Lieutenant-Colonel Cyril Montagu Luck DSO Royal Engineers
- Lieutenant-Colonel Edward James, Earl of Elgin and Kincardine, Royal Artillery
- Major Francis Fane Lambarde DSO
- Major Harold Charles Thoroton Hildyard DSO
- Major Harry Romer Lee DSO
- Major George Stuart Knox, Royal Engineers
- Major William Kelson Russell DSO Royal Engineers
- Lieutenant-Colonel Lancelot Richmond Beadon DSO Royal Army Service Corps
- Major Gilbert Claud Hamilton DSO Grenadier Guards
- Major Mervyn Meares DSO Royal Army Ordnance Corps
- Major Henry Alexander Boyd DSO Royal Artillery
- Temp Major Hubert Stanley Whitmore Pennington DSO Royal Army Service Corps
- Major William Murray Stewart DSO Cameron Highlanders
- Temp Major William Belfield, Royal Army Service Corps
- Major John Poole Bowring Robinson DSO Royal Dublin Fusiliers
- Major Rupert Caesar Smythe DSO Royal Inniskilling Fusiliers, attd. Royal Irish Rifles
- Major Lancelot Edward Seth Ward DSO Royal Artillery, Oxfordshire & Buckinghamshire Light Infantry
- Major Frederick George Skipwith, Labour Corps
- Temp Major Joseph Dalrymple OBE Royal Army Medical Corps
- Temp Major William Alfred Greenley DSO Royal Army Service Corps
- Major Duncan Grant-Dalton DSO West Yorkshire Regiment, employed 19th Battalion, Welsh Regiment
- Major John Inglis, Highland Light Infantry, employed Cameron Highlanders
- Major Alan Hamer Maude DSO Royal Army Service Corps
- Major Lawrence Chenevix-Trench DSO Royal Engineers
- Major Leopold Christian Duncan Jenner DSO
- Temp Major James Aubrey Smith, General List, employed Labour Corps
- Captain Hubert Conrad Sparks DSO MC London Regiment
- Captain and Brevet Major Edward Cuthbert de Renzy Martin DSO MC Yorkshire Light Infantry, attd. 11th Battalion, Lancashire Fusiliers
- Captain and Brevet Major William Henry Annesley DSO

Canadian Force

- Brigadier-General John Munro Ross DSO British Columbia Regiment
- Brigadier-General Dennis Colburn Draper DSO Quebec Regiment
- Brigadier-General Daniel Mowat Ormond DSO Alberta Regiment
- Brigadier-General John Smith Stewart DSO Canadian Field Artillery
- Brigadier-General Alexander Ross DSO Saskatchewan Regiment
- Colonel Robert Percy Wright DSO Canadian Army Medical Corps
- Colonel Alexander Macphail DSO Royal Canadian Engineers
- Major and Brevet Lieutenant-Colonel William Beaumont Anderson DSO Royal Canadian Engineers
- Lieutenant-Colonel Herbert John Dawson DSO Saskatchewan Regiment
- Lieutenant-Colonel Archibald de Mowbray Bell, Canadian Army Service Corps
- Lieutenant-Colonel Spurgeon Campbell, Canadian Army Medical Corps
- Lieutenant-Colonel William Robert Bertram DSO Manitoba Regiment
- Lieutenant-Colonel Stratton Harry Osler DSO Royal Canadian Engineers
- Lieutenant-Colonel Johnson Lindsay Rowlett Parsons DSO Saskatchewan Regiment
- Major Kenric Rud Marshall DSO Central Ontario Regiment
- Lieutenant-Colonel John Franklin Kidd, Canadian Army Medical Corps

Australian Imperial Force

- Colonel Edwin Tivey CB DSO VD General List, Australian Imperial Force
- Colonel Evan Alexander Wisdom CB DSO General List, Australian Imperial Force
- Colonel James Campbell Stewart DSO General List, Australian Imperial Force
- Colonel Iven Gifford Mackay DSO General List, Australian Imperial Force
- Colonel Henry Arthur Goddard DSO Australian Imperial Force
- Colonel James Adam Dick, Australian Army Medical Corps
- Lieutenant-Colonel Carl Herman Jess DSO General List, Australian Imperial Force
- Lieutenant-Colonel Hector Osman Caddy DSO Australian Field Artillery
- Lieutenant-Colonel Ernest Edward Herrod DSO 7th Battalion, Australian Imperial Force
- Lieutenant-Colonel William Gillian Allsop DSO Australian Field Artillery
- Lieutenant-Colonel Herbert Thomas Christopher Layh DSO 60th Battalion, Australian Infantry
- Lieutenant-Colonel Donald Ticehurst Moore DSO 3rd Battalion Australian Infantry
- Lieutenant-Colonel Bertie Vandeleur Stacy DSO 1st Battalion, Australian Infantry
- Lieutenant-Colonel John Dudley Lavarack DSO Australian Field Artillery
- Lieutenant-Colonel Charles James Martin, Australian Army Medical Corps

New Zealand Force

- Colonel Donald Johnstone McGavin DSO FRCS New Zealand Medical Corps
- Lieutenant-Colonel Donald Norman Watson Murray DSO New Zealand Medical Corps

For services rendered in connection with Military Operations in Egypt:

- Colonel William Arthur Robinson CB Royal Artillery
- Lieutenant-Colonel Edward Charles Massy CB DSO Royal Artillery
- Lieutenant-Colonel Evelyn Pierce Sewell DSO Royal Army Medical Corps
- Lieutenant-Colonel The Honourable Guy Greville Wilson DSO East Riding of Yorkshire Yeomanry
- Lieutenant-Colonel Ralph Maximilian Yorke DSO Gloucestershire Yeomanry
- Major and Brevet Lieutenant-Colonel Archibald Percival Wavell MC Royal Highlanders
- Major and Brevet Lieutenant-Colonel Claude Stuart Rome DSO 11th Hussars
- Major and Brevet Lieutenant-Colonel Eric Montague Seton Charles DSO Royal Engineers
- Major Randal Plunkett Taylor Hawksley DSO Royal Engineers
- Major Noel Ernest Money DSO Shropshire Yeomanry
- Major Arthur Drummond Borton VC DSO 2/22nd Battalion, London Regiment

Australian Imperial Force

- Lieutenant-Colonel Thomas John Todd DSO 10th Australian Light Horse Regiment

For services rendered in connection with Military Operations in Italy:

- Lieutenant-Colonel and Brevet Colonel The Honourable John Francis Gathorne-Hardy CB DSO Grenadier Guards
- Major and Brevet Colonel Herbert Richard Done DSO Norfolk Regiment
- Lieutenant-Colonel Henry Edward Gogarty DSO Worcestershire Regiment
- Lieutenant-Colonel Samuel Arthur Archer, Royal Army Medical Corps
- Lieutenant-Colonel Harry Arthur Leonard Howell, Royal Army Medical Corps
- Lieutenant-Colonel John Weir West Royal Army Medical Corps
- Lieutenant-Colonel Charles Hilton Furnivall, Royal Army Medical Corps
- Major and Brevet Lieutenant-Colonel George Henry Barnett DSO King's Royal Rifle Corps
- Major and Brevet Lieutenant-Colonel Cyril Darcy Vivian Cary-Barnard DSO Wiltshire Regiment
- Major and Brevet Lieutenant-Colonel Raymond Theodore Pelly DSO North Lancashire Regiment Spec. Reserve
- Major Charles Henry Marion Bingham DSO Royal Army Service Corps
- Major John Leonard Jesse DSO Royal Army Service Corps
- Major James Henry Edward Holford DSO Nottinghamshire Yeomanry, attd. 12th Battalion, Durham Light Infantry
- Major Everard How Rooke DSO Royal Engineers
- Temp Major Philip Cahill Sheridan, Royal Engineers
- Honorary Colonel Sir Harry Waechter Bt Royal Field Artillery
- Temp Lieutenant-Colonel Sydney Douglas Rumbold DSO MC York & Lancaster Regiment

For valuable services rendered in connection with Military Operations in Salonika:

- Lieutenant-Colonel Claude Buist Martin Royal Army Medical Corps
- Lieutenant-Colonel Harold Eustace Carey DSO Royal Artillery
- Lieutenant-Colonel Ralph Henvey DSO Royal Artillery
- Lieutenant-Colonel Douglas Keith Elphinstone Hall DSO 3rd Battalion, Dorsetshire Regiment (Spec. Reserve)
- Major and Brevet Lieutenant-Colonel Bernard John Majendie DSO King's Royal Rifle Corps
- Lieutenant-Colonel Herbert Ellicombe Molesworth DSO Royal Garrison Artillery
- Major and Brevet Lieutenant-Colonel George Ireland Fraser DSO Cameron Highlanders
- Major and Brevet Lieutenant-Colonel Philip Lewis Hanbury DSO Shropshire Light Infantry
- Major Douglas Charles Faichnie, Royal Army Ordnance Corps

For valuable services rendered in connection with Military Operations in North Russia:

- Lieutenant-Colonel John Josselyn DSO OBE TD 6th (Cyclist) Battalion, Suffolk Regiment
- Temp Lieutenant-Colonel Frederick Henry Wickham Guard DSO General List
- Temp Lieutenant-Colonel Philip James Woods DSO General List

Honorary Companions

- His Highness Mahommed Shemseddin Iskander, Sultan of the Maldive Islands
- Oladugbolu Onikepe, Alafin of Oyo, Unofficial Member of the Nigerian Council

== The Most Eminent Order of the Indian Empire ==
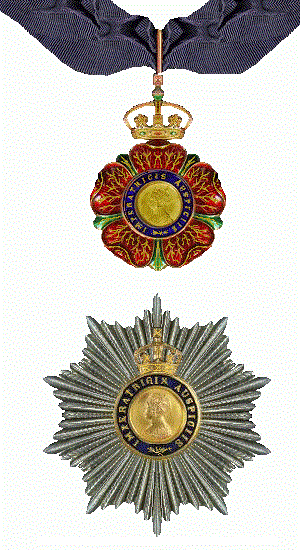
Riband, badge and star of the Knight Grand Commander of the Order of the Indian Empire

=== Knight Grand Commander (GCIE) ===
- His Highness Farzand-Khas-DauIat-Inglishia Maharaja Sir Sayaji Rao Gaekwar Sena Khas Khel Shamsher Bahadur GCSI Maharaja of Baroda
- Lieutenant-Colonel His Highness Sawai Maharaja Sir Jai Singh Bahadur KCSI KCIE Maharaja of Alwar, Rajputana

=== Knight Commander (KCIE) ===
- Nicholas Dodd Beatson-Bell CSI CIE Indian Civil Service, Chief Commissioner of Assam
- William Sinclair Marris CIE Indian Civil Service, Joint Secretary to the Government of India, Home Department (on deputation)
- Mehtar Shuja ul-Mulk CIE of Chitral, North-West Frontier Province
- Khan Bahadur Maulvi Rahim Bakhsh CIE President, Council of Regency, Bahawalpur
- James Herbert Seabrooke CIE Joint Secretary, Military Department, India Office

=== Companion (CIE) ===
- Lewis Sydney Steward O'Malley, Indian Civil Service, Secretary to the Government of Bengal
- Provash Chandra Mitter, Calcutta
- James George Jennings, Director of Public Instruction, Bihar and Orissa
- Samuel Perry O'Donnell, Indian Civil Service, Chief Secretary, Government of United Provinces
- Edward Mitchener Cook, Indian Civil Service, Controller of Currency, Bombay
- Christian Tindall, Indian Civil Service, Secretary to Government of Bengal
- Arthur Innes Mayhew, Director of Public Instruction, Central Provinces
- William Crooke, Indian Civil Service (retired)
- Vincent Arthur Smith, Indian Civil Service (retired)
- Austin Low JP Chairman of Northbrook Society
- Lieutenant-Colonel Andrew Alexander Irvine, Indian Army, Punjab Commission, District Judge, Montgomery, Punjab
- Hubert Digby Watson, Indian Civil Service, Deputy Commissioner, Jullunder, Punjab
- George Ernle Chatfield, Indian Civil Service, Collector and Magistrate, Ahmedabad, Bombay
- Lieutenant-Colonel John Telfer Calvert Indian Medical Service, Principal, Medical College, Calcutta
- Charles Gilbert Rogers, Chief Conservator of Forests, Burma
- Bernard d'Olier Barley, Executive Engineer, Tarai, United Provinces
- Thomas Heed Davy Bell, Chief Conservator of Forests, Bombay
- Walter Francis Perree, Conservator of Forests, Kumaon, United Provinces
- Bertram Beresford Osmaston, President, Forest Research Institute and College, Dehra Dun, United Provinces
- Major John Hanna Murray Indian Medical Service, Andaman Islands
- Reverend Dr. William Skinner, Principal, Madras Christian College, Madras
- Colonel Herbert Augustus Iggulden, Commanding Bangalore Brigade
- Major and Brevet Lieutenant-Colonel Richard Stukeley St. John DSO Indian Army, Embarkation Commandant, Bombay
- Major Stanley Somerset Wreford Paddon, Staff Officer attached to Military Department, India Office
- Major Walter Mason VD Chairman, Surma Valley Branch of Indian Tea Association, Assam
- William Alfred Rae Wood, His Britannic Majesty's Consul, Chiengmai, Siam
- John Carlos Kennedy Peterson, Indian Civil Service, Controller of Munitions, Bengal
- Lieutenant-Colonel Andrew Louis Charles McCormick, Royal Engineers, Senior Mint Master, Calcutta
- Lieutenant-Colonel Francis Edward Swinton, Indian Medical Service, Medical Storekeeper, Bombay
- Lieutenant-Colonel John Charles Lamont Indian Medical Service (retired), Professor of Anatomy, Medical College, Lahore, Punjab
- Captain Charles James Cope Kendall DSO Royal Indian Marine
- Sardar Bahadur Lieutenant-Colonel Muhammad Afzal Khan, Commandant, Bahawalpur Imperial Service Camel Corps
- Ernest Albert Seymour Bell, Agent, Eastern Bengal State Railway
- Major Francis Richard Soutter Gervers, Royal Engineers, Officiating Assistant Commanding Royal Engineers, Nowshera, North-West Frontier Province
- Colin John Davidson, His Britannic Majesty's Vice-Consul, Yokohama
- Francis John Preston, Chief Engineer, Great Indian Peninsula Railway, Bombay
- Albert Harlow Silver, Indian Munitions Board
- Frederick William Hanson, late General Traffic Manager, Bombay, Baroda and Central India Railway
- Nawab Malik Khuda Bakhsh Khan Tiwanar OBE Revenue Member, Bahawalpur, Punjab
- Khan Bahadur Maula Bakhsh, Attaché, Foreign and Political Department
- Colonel Vindeshri Prasad Singh, Chief Secretary, Benares State. Sardar Lakhamgouda Basava Prabhu Sir Desai, Vantmuri, Bombay

== The Royal Victorian Order ==
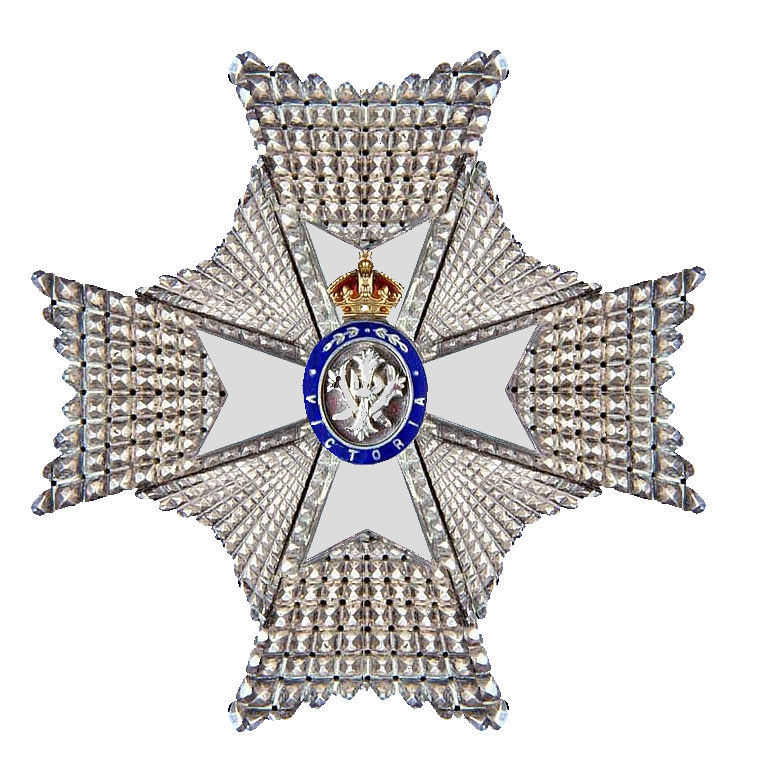
Insignia of a Knight / Dames Commander of the Royal Victorian Order

=== Knight Grand Cross of the Royal Victorian Order (GCVO) ===
- Major-General His Highness Sir Ganga Singhr Bahadur, Maharaja of Bikanir GCSI GCIE KCB Aide-de-camp to the King
- Richard Farrer, Baron Berschell KCVO
- Commander Sir Charles Leopold Cust Bt KCVO CB CMG CIE Royal Navy

=== Knight Commander of the Royal Victorian Order (KCVO) ===
- Major-General Lionel Arthur Montagu Stopford CB
- Sir George Anderson Critchett CVO

=== Commander of the Royal Victorian Order (CVO) ===
- Sir Edward Rigg CB ISO
- Colonel Arthur Robert Dick CB
- Colonel Malcolm David Graham CB CMG Aide-de-camp to the King
- The Right Rev. Andrew Wallace Williamson, Dean of the Thistle

=== Member of the Royal Victorian Order, 4th class (MVO) ===
- Lieutenant-Colonel Alan Ian, Duke of Northumberland
- Major Archibald, Baron Blythswood, Scots Guards
- Captain Wilfrid Tomkinson CB Royal Navy
- Colonel Vernor Chater
- Colonel Charles Wheler Hume
- Lieutenant-Colonel Sydney Lewis Penhorwood, Canadian Forestry Corps
- Major North Victor Cecil Dalrymple Hamilton, Scots Guards
- Lieutenant-Commander Charles Granville Naylor, Royal Navy (dated 20 November 1918)

== The Most Excellent Order of the British Empire ==
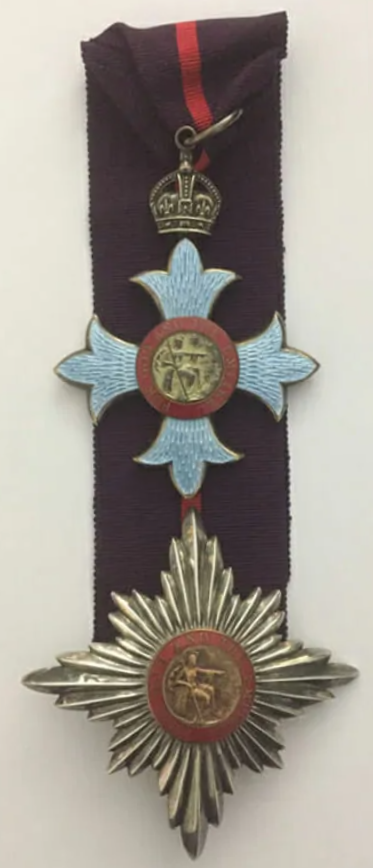
Knight Commander of the Order of the British Empire, insignia 1917–35

=== Dame Grand Cross of the Order of the British Empire (GBE) ===
==== Military Division ====
- Sidney Jane Browne RRC Matron-in-Chief, Territorial Nursing Service

==== Civil Division ====
- Her Royal Highness Princess Beatrice, President of the Isle of Wight Branch, British Red Cross Society
- Her Highness Princess Marie Louise, Head of the Bermondsey Voluntary Hospital
- Adeline Marie, Duchess of Bedford, Member of Joint War Committee, British Red Cross Society and Order of St. John of Jerusalem in England; President of the Ladies' Committee of the Order of St. John
- Mildred, Viscountess Buxton
- Sarah Ann Swift RRC Matron-in-Chief, British Red Cross Society and Order of St. John of Jerusalem in England
- Beatrix Frances, Marchioness of Waterford, Head of the Irish War Hospitals Supply Depots; Member of the Joint War Committee for Leinster, Munster and Connaught; British Red Cross Society and Order of St. John of Jerusalem in England

=== Knight Grand Cross of the Order of the British Empire (GBE) ===
==== Military Division ====
- Lieutenant-General Sir Henry Crichton Sclater GCB

==== Civil Division ====
- Walter Durnford VD Provost of King's College, Cambridge
- Sir Charles Edward Ellis KCB Member of Ministry of Munitions Council and Representative of the Ministry in France and Italy; previously Director-General of Ordnance Supply; late Managing Director, Messrs. John Brown & Co., Ltd.
- William Robert Wellesley, Viscount Peel, Chairman of Panel, Military Service (Government Departments) Committee; Chairman of Disabled Sailors' and Soldiers' Compensation Committee; formerly Chairman of the Committee on Detention of Neutral Vessels and of the Black List Committee
- George Fitzroy Henry, Baron Raglan CB Late Lieutenant-Governor of the Isle of Man
- Colonel Sir Edward Willis Duncan Ward Bt KCB KCVO Director-General of Voluntary Organisations; Commanding and Chief Staff Officer of the Metropolitan Special Constabulary

=== Dame Commander of the Order of the British Empire (DBE) ===
==== Military Division ====
- Florence Edith Victoria Leach CBE Controller-in-Chief, Queen Mary's Army Auxiliary Corps

==== Civil Division ====
- Rachel Eleanor Crowdy RRC Principal Commandant, Voluntary Aid Detachments in France
- Henrietta Caroline, Lady Henderson
- Lady Blanche Gordon-Lennox, Director of H.R.H. Princess Victoria's Rest Clubs for Nurses
- Georgiana, Baroness Mount Stephen, Queen Mary's Needlework Guild

=== Knight Commander of the Order of the British Empire (KBE) ===
==== Military Division ====
Royal Navy

- Admiral Robert Nelson Ommanney CB
- Rear-Admiral Edward Fitzmaurice Inglefield CBE
- Rear-Admiral Edmund Radcliffe Pears CB

Army

- Honorary Lieutenant-Colonel Henry Worth Thornton, Royal Engineers
- Major George McLaren Brown
- Temp Honorary Colonel John Lynn-Thomas CB CMG FRCS
- Colonel Harry Edwin Bruce Bruce-Porter CMG Army Medical Service
- Brevet Lieutenant-Colonel Thomas Duncan Rhind CBE TD Chief Recorder, Ministry of National Service

For services rendered in connection with military operations in France and Flanders:

- Temp Colonel Sir Almroth Edward Wright Kt CB FRCSI FRS Army Medical Service
- Major General The Right Honourable Lovick Bransby Friend CB Royal Engineers
- Colonel General Samuel Hickson CB Army Medical Service

==== Civil Division ====
- Francis Theodore Boys, Principal Director of Meat Supplies, Ministry of Food
- Cecil Lindsay Budd CBE Member of Non-ferrous Materials Department, Ministry of Munitions; Chairman of the Copper Committee and British Representative on the Inter-Allied Non-Ferrous Materials Committee
- Edward Napier Burnett JP FRCS FRCP Chairman of the Economic Committee of the Army Medical Department, War Office
- Geoffrey Butler CBE Director of the British Bureau of Information, U.S.A.
- James Carmichael JP Chairman of the Munition Works Board and of the Building Materials Supply Committee; Member of the Surplus Government Property Disposal Board
- Thomas Clement, Chairman of the Cheese and Butter Import Committee, Ministry of Food
- Sir Clement Kinloch-Cooke MP
- Major Algernon Tudor-Craig CBE Secretary, Incorporated Soldiers' and Sailors' Help Society
- Richard James Curtis, Food Commissioner for the Midland Division
- Percy Daniels, Head of Leather Purchasing Commission, British War Mission in U.S.A.
- Sir Alfred Eyles KCB Late Accountant-General of the Navy
- Herbert Gibson, Wheat Commissioner for the Royal Commission on Wheat Supplies in Argentina and Uruguay
- Sir Frederick Green, League of Mercy
- Sir Henry Rider Haggard, Member of the Dominions Royal Commission and of the Empire Settlement Committee
- Laurence Edward Halsey, Honorary Accountant, Prince of Wales's National Relief Fund
- William John Jones CBE Member of Iron and Steel Production Department, Ministry of Munitions
- John McKie Lees KC Sheriff of Forfarshire and Convener of the Sheriffs of Scotland
- Norman Alexander Leslie CBE Transport Department, Ministry of Shipping; Organiser of British and Allied Shipping in connection with the convoy system
- Alexander Mackenzie, Rio de Janeiro
- John McLaren JP Chairman Board of Control, National Ordnance Factories, Leeds, Ministry of Munitions; Chairman of Messrs. J. & H. McLaren, Midland Engine Works, Leeds
- Henry McLaughlin, Member of the Irish Recruiting Council
- Lieutenant-Colonel John Herbert Mansell DL Managing Director, Coventry Ordnance Works
- Captain William Maxwell
- George Douglas Cochrane Newton, Assistant Secretary (unpaid), Rural Reconstruction Department, Ministry of Reconstruction
- Bernard Pares, Professor of Russian, University of London
- John Pedder CB Assistant Secretary, Home Office; Member of the Central Control Board (Liquor Traffic)
- His Honour Judge George Bettesworth Piggott CBE Chairman of Special Military Service Tribunal for London and Deputy Chairman of the House of Commons Section of the Appeal Tribunal for London
- Colonel Thomas Andrew Polson CMG Chief Inspector of Clothing, Royal Army Clothing Department
- William Jackson Pope CBE FRS Member of the Chemical Warfare Committee, Ministry of Munitions; Professor of Chemistry, Cambridge University
- George Archdall O'Brien Reid CM
- Ashley Sparks, Director-General of British Ministry of Shipping in U.S.A.
- Commander Guy Standing CBE RNVR British War Mission to U.S.A.
- Aubrey Strahan FRS Director of the Geological Survey of Great Britain and of the Geological Museum
- William Thorn, Chairman, Blackburn Board of Management, Ministry of Munitions; Member of the Engineering Trades (New Industries) Committee of the Ministry of Reconstruction; Director of Messrs. Yates & Thorn, Ltd.
- James Howard Warrack, Member of the Admiralty Transport Arbitration Board; ex-President of the Chamber of Shipping of the United Kingdom
- William Alfred Waterlow, Managing Director of Messrs. Waterlow Bros. & Layton
- Arthur Francis Whinney, Adviser on Costs of Production, Admiralty
- Colonel William Hale-White Royal Army Medical Corps, Chairman and Consultant, Queen Mary's Royal Naval Hospital, Southend
- Arthur Willert, Correspondent of The Times at Washington; Late Secretary of the British War Mission in Washington
- John Bowring Wimble, Chairman of London Shipowners' and Transport Workers' Military Service Committee
- James Williams Woods, Director of Purchases, British War Mission in U.S.A.
- John Wormald, Chairman of the General Service and Industries Committees, War Priorities Committee; Managing Director, Messrs. Mather and Platt
- Albert William Wyon, Senior Partner, Messrs. Price, Waterhouse & Co.; Government Accountant of Controlled Canals, etc.

British India

- Lieutenant-Colonel Hector Travers Dennys CIE Indian Army, Inspector-General of Police, Punjab
- Sir Stanley Reed, Vice-President, Central Publicity Board
- Sir Henry George Richards KC Chief Justice of the High Court of Allahabad
- Lieutenant-Colonel James Wishart Thomson, Agent to the Shipping Controller in India

Sudan

- Colonel Edgar Edwin Bernard CMG Financial Secretary of the Sudan Government

Diplomatic Service and Overseas List
Colonies, Protectorates, etc.

=== Commander of the Order of the British Empire (CBE) ===
==== Military Division ====
Royal Navy

- Captain Rowland Henry Bather
- Paymaster Captain George Christopher Aubin Boyer
- Surgeon-Captain George Thomas Broach
- Commander Wilfred Montague Bruce RD Royal Naval Reserve
- Captain Adolphus Edmund Bell, Trinity House
- Commander Thomas Evans Crease CB
- Captain John Gilbert de Odingsells Coke
- Captain George Knightley Chetwode
- Honorary Paymaster Captain Henry Ashley Travers Cummins OBE
- Captain Herbert Edward Purey-Cust CB Royal Naval Reserve (Vice-Admiral, retired)
- Captain Arthur Wellesley Clarke, Trinity House
- Paymaster Captain Charles Augustus Royer Flood Dunbar
- Captain Frederic Charles Dreyer CB
- Commander George Duncan
- Captain John Dodson Daintree
- Commander Francis Edmund Musgrave Garforth
- Captain Thomas Golding, Trinity House
- Paymaster Commander Hugh Seymour Hall
- Captain Arthur Halsey
- Rear-Admiral Hugh Thomas Hibbert DSO
- Captain Owen Jones, Trinity House
- Commander Henry Douglas King DSO VD Royal Naval Reserve
- Rear-Admiral Albert Sumner Lafone
- Captain Charles Henry Clarke Langdon
- Rear-Admiral Edgar Lees
- Rear-Admiral Frederick Charles Learmonth CB
- Captain Frank Oswald Lewis
- Captain Armytage Anthony Lucas
- Paymaster Commander William Henry le Brun
- Rear-Admiral George Robert Mansell MVO Trinity House
- Captain Oswald Percival Marshall, Trinity House
- Engineer Captain Henry Wray Metcalfe
- Engineer Captain George William Murray
- Captain John Warde Osborne
- Commander Francis Hungerford Pollen
- Commander Arthur Henry Rostron RD Royal Naval Reserve
- Engineer Captain George William Roome
- Paymaster Captain Harry Robinson
- Captain John Barnes Sparks
- Commander Charles Valentine Smith
- Surgeon-Captain Vidal Gunson Thorpe
- Captain Anthony Standidge Thomson, Trinity House
- Captain Charles William Thomas
- Captain Lionel de Lautour Wells CMG

Army

- Colonel Herbert Edward Stacy Abbott DSO Royal Engineers
- Colonel Charles Henry Alexander, Royal Artillery
- Brevet Colonel Alfred James Arnold DSO late 3rd Dragoon Guards
- Honorary Brigadier-General Edward William David Baird, late Suffolk Yeomanry
- Temp Lieutenant-Colonel William Neilson Bicket, Royal Engineers
- Brevet Lieutenant-Colonel Chetwynd Rokeby Alfred Bond, late Indian Staff Corps
- Temp Lieutenant-Colonel Frederick Henry Browning, Special List
- Colonel Paul Robert Burn-Clerk-Rattray, late Royal Engineers
- Lieutenant-Colonel Charles Walker Cathcart FRCS Royal Army Medical Corps
- Colonel Thomas Henry Matthews Clarke CMG DSO Army Medical Service
- Quartermaster and Major Henry Clay OBE East Surrey Regiment
- Colonel Evelyn Rivers Henry Josias Cloete, Royal Artillery
- Colonel Lionel Combe, late Royal Dublin Fusiliers
- Captain George Northcote Crisford, Inspector of Regions, Ministry of National Service
- Colonel George Dansey-Browning, Army Medical Service
- Colonel Edward Kaye Daubeney DSO late South Staffordshire Regiment
- Colonel Algernon Cecil Dawson, Territorial Force Association
- Brevet Colonel Simeon Hardy Exham CB Royal Engineers
- Lieutenant-Colonel Sir Joseph Fayrer Bt FRCS Royal Army Medical Corps
- Colonel Henry Finnis CSI Royal Engineers
- Lieutenant-Colonel Thomas Ernie Fowlo, Extra Regimentally employed List, South African Military Command
- Lieutenant-Colonel Robert John Harvey Gibson, Cadet Battalion, Liverpool Regiment
- Colonel Edward George Grogan CB late Royal Highlanders
- Major Stuart Hartshorn OBE Secretary, East Midlands Region, Ministry of National Service
- Brevet Colonel Robert Elton Home DSO Royal Artillery
- Colonel Charles Vesey Humphrys, late West Riding Regiment
- Colonel Herbert Rowett Henry Jack CMG late Royal Army Service Corps
- Colonel Richard Jennings KHS late Army Medical Service
- Major Sir Kenneth Hagar Kemp Bt 3rd Battalion, Norfolk Regiment
- Brevet Colonel Charles Douglas Learoyd, late Royal Engineers
- Brevet Colonel Arthur Russell Loscombe, late West India Regiment
- Colonel Francis Douglas Lumley CB late Middlesex Regiment
- Brevet Major Henry Davies Foster MacGeagh, 5th Battalion, London Regiment
- Temp Lieutenant-Colonel Henry William Madoc, Special List
- Colonel Ernest Elliott Markwick CB Royal Army Ordnance Corps
- Colonel Alfred Douglas Miller DSO late 2nd Dragoons
- Captain Peter Chalmers Mitchell OBE FRS British War Mission in U.S.A.
- Major Henry John Neilson, late Royal Army Medical Corps
- Captain Geoffrey Kelsall Peto, Wiltshire Yeomanry; Director of Projectile Contracts, Ministry of Munitions
- Lieutenant-Colonel George Julian Selwyn Scovell, Cameron Highlanders
- Temp Honorary Major Henry Session Souttar FRCS Royal Army Medical Corps
- Colonel Herbert Brooke Taylor MBE VD Territorial Force Association (late 2nd Battalion, Nottinghamshire and Derbyshire Regiment)
- Brevet Colonel Philip Beauchamp Taylor, Royal Artillery
- Colonel Herbert Radclyffe Vaughan, late Royal Warwickshire Regiment
- Colonel Anthony Mildmay Julian, Earl of Westmorland ADC Lancashire Fusiliers (Spec. Reserve)
- Lieutenant-Colonel George Alexander Eason Wilkinson DSO Royal Defence Corps
- Brevet Colonel Charles Henry Luttrell Fahie Wilson, late Royal Artillery
- Colonel Fitzgerald Wintour CB late Royal West Kent Regiment

Overseas Military Forces of Canada

- Colonel George Devey Farmer, Canadian Army Medical Corps
- Lieutenant-Colonel William Ross Smyth, Canadian Forestry Corps
- Colonel John Stewart, Canadian Army Medical Corps
- Colonel Walter Reginald Ward, Canadian General List

Australian Imperial Force

- Colonel Thomas Griffiths CMG DSO
- Colonel John Patrick McGlinn CMG
- Lieutenant-Colonel Murray McWhae CMG Australian Army Medical Corps
- Colonel Henry Carr Maudsley CMG Australian Army Medical Corps

Administrative Headquarters of New Zealand

- Major William Marshall Macdonald New Zealand Medical Corps
- Lieutenant-Colonel Henry John McLean FRCS New Zealand Medical Corps
- Lieutenant-Colonel George Spafford Richardson CB CMG New Zealand Staff Corps

Union of South Africa

- Temp Lieutenant-Colonel Edward Newbury Thornton OBE South African Medical Corps

For services rendered in connection with military operations in France and Flanders:

- Lieutenant-Colonel Hugh Fenwick Brooke CB CMG Royal Army Service Corps
- Colonel Francis William John Caulfield, Indian Army
- Rev. Arthur James William Crosse, Royal Army Chaplains' Department
- Colonel Arthur Bruce Dunsterville CMG late East Surrey Regiment
- Quartermaster and Major Joseph Vinters Laughton, 21st Lancers, attd. Tank Corps
- Brevet Lieutenant-Colonel Charles Lane Magniac CMG Royal Engineers
- Lieutenant-Colonel Lewis Francis Philips DSO King's Royal Rifle Corps
- Colonel Joseph Howard Poett CB CMG late Staff

Overseas Military Forces of Canada

For services rendered in connection with military operations in France and Flanders:

- Lieutenant-Colonel Count Henry Robert Visart de Bury and de Bocarmé, Canadian Ordnance Corps
- Major William Samuel Fetherstonhaugh CMG Canadian Forestry Corps
- Lieutenant-Colonel Arthur Murray Jarvis CMG Canadian General List
- Lieutenant-Colonel George Hamilton Johnson, Canadian Forestry Corps
- Lieutenant-Colonel John Lawrence Miller, Canadian Forestry Corps
- Principal Matron Ethel Blanche Ridley RRC Canadian Nursing Service

Australian Imperial Force

- Principal Matron Grace Margaret Wilson RRC Army Auxiliary Nursing Service

For valuable services rendered in connection with Military Operations in Egypt:

- Major and Brevet Lieutenant-Colonel William John Ainsworth DSO Durham Light Infantry
- Temp Colonel Charles Coley Choyce FRGS Royal Army Medical Corps
- Temp Major Lyall Newcombe Cooper DSO Royal Engineers
- Major and Brevet Lieutenant-Colonel Aylmer Basil Cunningham DSO Royal Engineers
- Lieutenant-Colonel Cathcart Garner late Royal Army Medical Corps
- Major and Brevet Lieutenant-Colonel George Lennox Hay DSO Royal Army Ordnance Corps
- Major Watkin Randle Kynaston Mainwaring, Denbighshire Yeomanry
- Lieutenant-Colonel and Brevet Colonel Evelyn Pollock, Royal Jersey Militia Artillery
- Lieutenant-Colonel Arthur Kennedy Rawlins CIE DSO 24th Punjabis, Indian Army
- Local Colonel Ronald Storrs CMG
- Major and Brevet Lieutenant-Colonel Bertie Harry Waters Taylor, South Staffordshire Regiment
- Major Arthur George Todd DSO Royal Army Veterinary Corps

Australian Imperial Force

- Lieutenant-Colonel Graham Patrick Dixon, Australian Army Medical Corps
- Lieutenant-Colonel David Fulton, 3rd Light Horse Regiment
- Colonel Duncan McLeish CMG VD Australian Remount Service
- Lieutenant-Colonel Frank Graham Newton, General List

For services rendered in connection with Military Operations in Egypt:

- Lieutenant-Colonel George Vawdrey CMG Royal Army Service Corps

Royal Air Force

- Lieutenant-Colonel Thomas David Collis Barry
- Lieutenant-Colonel Thomas Reginald Cave-Browne-Cave
- Lieutenant-Colonel Frederick Holders Cleaver DSO
- Lieutenant-Colonel Christopher Lloyd Courtney DSO
- Lieutenant-Colonel Francis Richard Drake
- Honorary Lieutenant-Colonel Richard Frederick Drury OBE
- Major Herbert Charles Ellis
- Major Martin William Flack
- Lieutenant-Colonel Napier John Gill MC
- Lieutenant-Colonel John Crosby Halahan
- Lieutenant-Colonel Charles Brehmer Heald
- Lieutenant-Colonel Francis Richard Gurney Hoare
- Honorary Lieutenant-Colonel Harold Edward Sherwin Holt FRGS
- Lieutenant-Colonel James Murray Home
- Lieutenant-Colonel John Archibald Houison-Crauford
- Major Sir Norman Roderick Alexander David Leslie
- Brevet Lieutenant-Colonel Archibald Campbell Holms Maclean
- Major Harold Arthur Moore MC
- Acting Lieutenant-Colonel Francis Frederick Muecke FRCS
- Lieutenant-Colonel Alec Ogilvie OBE
- Lieutenant-Colonel Douglas Powell
- Lieutenant-Colonel Charles Russel Jekyl Randall
- Colonel John Miles Steel
- Lieutenant-Colonel Ralph Durrant Sadleir Stoney
- Lieutenant-Colonel Reginald George Talbot
- Lieutenant-Colonel Cecil Henry Whittington CMG

==== Civil Division ====
- Bennet Hoskyns-Abrahall, Director, Investigation Branch, Secretary's Office, General Post Office
- Annie Crawford Acheson, Head of Plastic Department, Orthopaedic Branch, Queen Mary's Needlework Guild
- Hartley Aspden JP Honorary Organiser of the "Beyond Seas" Association
- Constance Alice Bacon, Deputy President, Norfolk Branch, British Red Cross Society
- Arthur Baker, Late British Red Cross Commissioner, Romania
- George Henry Banister, Special Director, Messrs. Vickers, Ltd.
- Lieutenant-Colonel Arthur John Barry TD Commandant, Red Cross Convoys with the French Commission, France
- C. W. Bayne, Montevideo
- William John Benson OBE Ministry of Munitions
- Major John Lawrence Benthall TD Director, Messrs. Vickers, Ltd.
- William George Black Convener of Standing Voluntary Aid Detachment, Committee, Scottish Branch; British Red Cross Society
- Mary Booth Booth OBE Salvation Army
- Thomas Johnstone Bourne, War Office Representative in China
- William Boyd, Deputy Director-General of British Ministry of Shipping, New York
- Catherine Lavinia Brunskill, Late Private Secretary to the Adjutant-General
- Sir Richard Woodman Burbidge Bt
- John Macmaster Campbell JP
- Captain Arthur Edward Capel, Political Assistant Secretary to the British Section of the Supreme War Council, Versailles
- Ernest Bruce Charles KC Director, Wounded and Missing Inquiry Department, Havre
- George Christopher Clayton JP Director, The United Alkali Company., Ltd.
- John William Cobb, Livesey Professor of Coal, Gas, and Fuel Industries, Leeds University; Deputy Inspector of High Explosives, Ministry of Munitions, Leeds Area
- Richard James Coles OBE Acting Director of Finance, Ministry of Pensions
- Lady Gwendoline Audrey Adeline Brudenell Colvin, Chairman, Executive Committee, Essex Branch, British Red Cross Society
- William Patrick Joseph Connolly ISO Principal Clerk, Chief Secretary's Office, Dublin
- Andrew Crawford, Assistant Accountant-General, Ministry of Shipping
- John Gray Crookston, Controller of Propaganda in Russia, Ministry of Information
- Henry Hallett Dale FRS
- John Ford Darling
- The Honourable Arthur Jex Davey, Deputy Director of Army Contracts (Honorary) (to date 9 October 1918)
- Charles William Dawkins, Controller of Contracts, Ministry of Information
- George Francis Dixon, Marine Superintendent, South-Eastern and Chatham Railway
- Kathleen, Countess of Drogheda
- John Edmund Drower, Assistant Director of Army Contracts
- Lieutenant-Colonel Francis Dudley Williams-Drummond JP DL Live Stock Commissioner for South Wales
- Alfred Eichholz Senior Assistant Medical Officer, Board of Education
- Marjory Edith Robertson-Eustace, Organiser and Administrator of the first Rest Club for Nursing Sisters in France
- Katharine Waldo Douglas Fedden MBE Chairman of the Belgravia War Hospital Supply Depot
- Walter George Fish, Department of Controller of Coal Mines, Board of Trade
- Charles Browning Fisher, Joint Agricultural Adviser to Ministry of Food; Liaison Officer with Irish Food Control Committee
- Francis John FitzGerald JP Chairman, Oxfordshire Appeal Tribunal
- The Reverend Adam Forman, Honorary Secretary, Sphagnum Moss Committee
- Major Wilfrid Lionel Foster DSO Organiser, Royal Artillery Prisoners of War Fund
- Annie Christine Fountain
- Walter John Fryer, Manager (Honorary), Royal Army Clothing Department Factories
- James Clerk Maxwell Garnett, Principal, Municipal College of Technology, Manchester
- Hope Gibson, Buenos Aires
- Grace Catherine Rose Davies-Gilbert, Deputy President, Eastbourne Division, Sussex Branch, British Red Cross Society
- The Honourable Maud Ernestine Gladstone, Vice-President, Chester City Division, Cheshire Branch, British Red Cross Society
- Ernest Hope Goddard, Acting Editor of The Illustrated London News and The Sketch
- Neil Forbes Grant, Editor, Cables and Wireless, Ministry of Information
- John Arch Greene, Food Commissioner for Yorkshire Division
- Mabel Laura, Countess Grey, President, Northumberland Branch, British Red Cross Society
- Herbert Austen Groves, Deputy to the Assistant Secretary, Admiralty
- William Joseph Haines OBE Salvation Army
- Frederick Eardley John Blackburne-Hall JP Food Commissioner for the Home Counties (North and South) Division
- Brigadier-General Dayrell Talbot Hammond CB Military Adviser and Chief of Staff to the Irish Recruiting Council
- Lancelot Hannen, Organiser of Christie's "Our Day" Red Cross Sales
- Frank Hastings, Secretary, Headquarters Staff, British Red Cross Society
- Gerald Edward Chadwyck-Healey, Director of Materials and Priority, Admiralty
- Lady Victoria Alexandrina Mary Cecil Herbert, Organiser, Lady Victoria Herbert's Prisoners of War Fund
- David Wilson Hood, Engineer-in-Chief, Trinity House
- Stanley Wyndham Jamieson, Private Secretary to Deputy Secretary of State for War
- Paymaster Lieutenant-Commander David Thomas Jones RNR Secretary of the Fishery Board for Scotland
- Edgar Heath-Jones MBE Financial Secretary, Central Prisoners of War Committee
- James Donald Keay, Engine Works Manager, Messrs. Harland & Wolff, Ltd.
- Chris Shotter Kent OBE British War Mission in U.S.A.
- William Walker Lackie, Chief Engineer, Glasgow Corporation Electricity Department
- Hilary Howard Leng
- John Lewis JP
- Sir Robert Ashton Lister, Commissioner for War Savings, West of England
- Albert Henry Lloyd, Secretary, Recreation Huts Department, Church Army
- Samuel Cook Lloyd JP Chairman, Dudley Local War Pensions Committee
- Arthur Labron Lowe Registrar, Birmingham County Court
- Samuel Lyle Commissioner of Medical Services, Ministry of National Service
- Lieutenant Charles William Home McCall OBE Controller of Appointments Department, Ministry of Labour
- Margaret Craig, Lady McCullagh OBE President, Belfast Branch, Queen Mary's Needlework Guild
- Alexander Patrick McDougall, Live Stock Commissioner for Scotland
- Eric Robert Dalrymple Maclagan, Controller for France, Ministry of Information
- Thomas McMillan, City Treasurer, Glasgow
- Julia McMordie MBE President of St. John Voluntary Aid Detachment's for Belfast
- Hilda Madeleine, Countess of March, President of the Sussex Branch and of the Bermondsey Division, Soldiers' and Sailors' Families Association; Representative of the Association on the War Pensions Statutory Committee
- Dudley Sinclair Marjoribanks, Local Director, Messrs. Sir W. G. Armstrong, Whitworth & Co., Ltd.; Vice-Chairman, Engineering Employers Advisory Committee
- Arthur Mellersh, Surveyor, General Post Office
- Thomas Graham Menzies, Director of Special Construction, Civil Engineer in Chief's Department, Admiralty
- John Moffat, Vice-Chairman, National Allied Relief Committee
- Lieutenant-General George Hay Moncrieff, Vice-Chairman, Incorporated Soldiers' and Sailors' Help Society (to date 14 October 1918)
- George Morgan ISO Controller, Post Office Stores Department
- The Honourable Helen Mary, Lady Murray, Directress, Lady Murray's Red Cross Hospital, Le Tréport
- Charles Lee Nichols, Honorary Auditor, British Red Cross Society and Order of St. John
- Henry Obré, Chairman of No. 8 Red Cross (Baltic and Corn Exchange) Hospital, Étaples
- James George O'Keefe OBE British War Mission in U.S.A.
- Beryl Carnegy, Lady Oliver RRC Head of the Naval and Military Voluntary Aid Detachment, Department, British Red Cross Society
- Charles Augustus Oliver, Assistant Director of Navy Contracts
- Henry Hughes-Onslow, Government Committee on Treatment of Prisoners of War
- Jonathan Orchard OBE Chief Inspector of Customs and Excise
- Lieutenant-Commander Henry Edward Clarence Paget OBE RNVR Head of the Observation Service, Metropolitan Special Constabulary
- John Robert Pakeman
- Standen Leonard Pearce, Chief Engineer and Manager, Manchester Corporation Electricity Department
- Louis Frederick Pearson, Chairman, Nottingham Munitions Board of Management
- Admiral Frederick Sidney Pelham, County Director, Auxiliary Hospitals and Voluntary Aid Detachments, Sussex
- Beatrice Eleanor, Countess of Pembroke and Montgomery OBE Vice-President, Wiltshire Branch, British Red Cross Society; Organiser, Wilton House Auxiliary Hospital, Salisbury
- William Piercy, Director of the Allied Provisions Export Commission, U.S.A.
- Richard Pigott JP Director of Tea Supplies, Ministry of Food
- Ernest Manifold Raeburn, Director of Transport Department, British Ministry of Shipping in U.S.A.
- Charles Julius Reiss, Secretary, Liner Requisition Committee, Ministry of Shipping
- George Quinlan Roberts, Secretary, St. Thomas's Hospital
- George Robey
- Lady Charlotte Emma Maud Rolleston, Honorary Secretary of the Nottinghamshire County Branch and of the Nottingham Division, Soldiers' and Sailors' Families' Association
- James Stirling Ross, Deputy Assistant Financial Secretary, Air Ministry
- Florence Haynes-Rudge, Commandant and Donor, Abbey Manor Auxiliary Hospital, Evesham, Worcestershire
- Alexander Whitehead Sampson, Director of Auxiliary Vessels, Admiralty
- Harry Sterratt Seddon, Joint Honorary Treasurer, Lancashire County War Comforts Association
- Robert Hope Selbie, Controller of Horse Transport, Board of Trade
- Thomas Shaw JP Director of National Service, West Midlands Region
- William Barbour Shaw, Director, Factory Construction Department, Ministry of Munitions
- Herbert John Simmonds OBE Assistant Secretary, Board of Education; Secretary to the Advisory Committee of the Military Service (Civil Liabilities) Committee
- Robert Patrick Sloan, Managing Director, Newcastle Electric Supply Co., Ltd.
- Lieutenant-Colonel Hugh Morton Stobart DSO Deputy Controller, Cultivation Division, Food Production Department
- George William Stonestreet OBE Director of Stamping, Board of Inland Revenue
- James Bruce Strain, Deputy Controller, Department of Gun Ammunition Filling, Ministry of Munitions
- Percival Francis Swain OBE Principal Clerk, Public Trustee Office
- Edgar William Thomas OBE Financial Adviser to the Public Trustee
- Colonel William Gordon Thomson VD DL JP Red Cross Commissioner, Central Eastern District of Scotland, and Honorary Secretary and Acting County Director for the County of the City of Dundee, Scottish Branch, British Red Cross Society
- Arthur Edward Towle, Assistant Secretary, Ministry of Food
- Edmund Arthur Trouton, Wounded and Missing Enquiry Department for Ireland, British Red Cross Society
- Lady Mary Katherine Turner, President, North Lincolnshire Branch, British Red Cross Society
- Arthur Rose Vincent, Chicago Representative, Ministry of Information
- Grace Vulliamy, For assistance rendered to British Civilians and Prisoners of War in Holland
- Mary Augusta Ward
- Lionel Ashton Piers Warner, Deputy General Manager, Mersey Docks and Harbour Board; Director of Ports Branch, Ministry of Shipping
- Captain George Francis Warre, Late Head of Motor Boat Department, British Red Cross Society; Donor of Rest House for Nurses, Roquebrune, Riviera
- Edith Margaret Watson, Private Secretary to the Chancellor of the Exchequer
- Sidney Henry Wells OBE Director of Civil Employment Bureau, Egyptian Expeditionary Force
- John William White, Committee on Production
- Henry Goodrich Willett, Secretary, Trinity House
- Cecil Mary, Lady Wilson, Founder and Head of the Clothing Branch, Officers' Families Fund
- William Francis John Wood JP Chairman and Managing Director of The Derby Crown Glass Company, The Rylands Glass and Engineering Company Limited, Wood Bros. Glass Company Limited, etc.
- The Honourable Horace Marton Woodhouse, Deputy Assistant Secretary, Ministry of Food
- William Henry Plukenett Woodroffe, Director of Road Transport, Labour and Material, Ministry of Food
- James Wylie OBE Department of Procurator-General

British India

- Frederick Warner Allum, Engineer-in-Chief, Nushki Extension Railway
- Colonel William George Beyts, Army Medical Service, Assistant Director of Medical Services, Bombay Brigade
- Victor Hope Boalth, Traffic Manager, North-Western Railway
- Lieutenant Charles Stewart Campbell, Indian Army Reserve of Officers, Recruiting Officer, Kirkee, Bombay
- Evelyn Roberta, Lady Cardew, Madras
- Gertrude Carmichael, Bombay
- Harold Arden Close CIE Inspector-General of Police, North-West Frontier Province
- Anthony Cathcart Coubrough, Indian Munitions Board
- Raja Sudhal Deo, Feudatory Chief, Bamra, Bihar and Orissa
- Godfrey Charles Denham CIE OBE Indian Police, Officiating Deputy Director, Central Intelligence
- Thomas Archibald Ferrier, Mathematical Instrument Office, Calcutta
- James Alexander Ossory Fitzpatrick CIE Indian Civil Service, Political Agent, Wana, North-West Frontier Province
- Henry Harcourt, Indian Civil Service, Deputy Commissioner, Rohtak, Punjab
- John Percy Hardiman, Indian Civil Service, Controller of Munitions, Burma
- William Falkiner Harnett VD Locomotive and Carriage Superintendent, Eastern Bengal State Railway
- Edgar Joseph Holberton, Consul for Siam, Burma
- Henry Burvill Holmes VD Agent, Oudh and Rohilkhund Railway
- Nawab Mumtaz-ud-Daula Sir Muhammad Faiyaz Ali Khan KCIE KCVO CSI Pahasu, United Provinces
- Honorary Captain Nawab Malik Muhammad Mubariz Khan, Tiwana OBE Shahpur, Punjab
- Darcy Lindsay, Secretary, Royal Insurance Company, Calcutta
- Miriam Isabel Lyons, President, Poona Women's Branch of the War and Relief Fund, Bombay
- Bhupendra Nath Mitra CIE OBE Controller of War Accounts
- Edmund Alexander Molony, Indian Civil Service, Commissioner, Agra Division, United Provinces
- Alexander Robertson Murray, Manager, Thomas Duff & Co., Calcutta, Bengal
- Lieutenant-Colonel Aubrey John O'Brien CIE Indian Army, Punjab Commission, Deputy Commissioner, Gujranwala, Punjab
- James Peter Orr CSI Indian Civil Service, Chairman, City Improvement Trust, Bombay
- Colonel Charles Marshall Pearce VD Indian Defence Force, General Traffic Manager, East Indian Railway, Bengal
- David Petrie CIE OBE Punjab Police (on special duty with Government of India)
- Sir John Stanley KCIE Vice-Chairman, Indian Soldiers' Fund
- Lieutenant-Colonel Ellacott Leamon Ward, Indian Medical Service, Inspector-General of Prisons, Punjab

Egypt

- John Langley, Under-Secretary of State, Ministry of Agriculture
- Henry Ward Boys, Assistant Counsel to His Highness the Sultan in the Ministries of the Interior and Justice
- Walter Ross-Taylor, Assistant Counsel to His Highness the Sultan in the Ministries of Agriculture, Public Works and War

Sudan

- Captain Edward Colpoys Midwinter CB CMG DSO General Manager, Sudan Government Railways and Steamers

== Royal Red Cross ==
=== First Class (RRC) ===
- Margaret Alexander ARRC Sister-in-Charge, Civil Hospital Reserve
- Kate Hilda Austen, Sister, St. John's Ambulance Brigade
- Lavina Badger ARRC Acting Matron, Queen Alexandra's Imperial Military Nursing Service Reserve
- Maude Mary Blakely RRC Acting Principal Matron, Queen Alexandra's Imperial Military Nursing Service
- Edith Cornwell ARRC Matron, Army Auxiliary Nursing Service
- Elsie Janet Evans ARRC Acting Sister, Civil Hospital Reserve
- Emily Vaughan Forrest ARRC Sister-in-Charge, Queen Alexandra's Imperial Military Nursing Service
- Maud Louise Francis, Nursing Sister, Canadian Army Medical Corps
- Janey Gray, Sister-in-Charge, Territorial Force Nursing Service
- Margaret Greig ARRC Acting Sister, Civil Hospital Reserve
- Maud Hopton ARRC Acting Matron, Civil Hospital Reserve
- Stella May Jenkins, Nursing Sister, Canadian Army Medical Corps
- Clara Viola Straatman Johnson ARRC Acting Matron, Queen Alexandra's Imperial Military Nursing Service
- Inga Johnson, Acting Matron, Canadian Army Medical Corps
- Constance Winifred Jones ARRC Acting Matron, Queen Alexandra's Imperial Military Nursing Service
- Mary McLean Loughron, Acting Matron, Queen Alexandra's Imperial Military Nursing Service Reserve
- Ellen Martha May, Sister, Territorial Force Nursing Service
- Mary Cecil Elizabeth Newman ARRC Acting Matron, Queen Alexandra's Imperial Military Nursing Service
- Olive Lucy Niles, Acting Sister, Queen Alexandra's Imperial Military Nursing Service Reserve
- Maud Plaskitt ARRC Acting Matron, Queen Alexandra's Imperial Military Nursing Service (retired)
- Annie Leonora Plimsaul ARRC Acting Matron, Queen Alexandra's Imperial Military Nursing Service
- Louisa Remnant ARRC Acting Sister, Civil Hospital Reserve
- Cecilia Ballingall Robb ARRC Sister-in-Charge, Civil Hospital Reserve
- Catherine Murray Roy, Sister-in-Charge, Queen Alexandra's Imperial Military Nursing Service
- Mary Ellen Ruck ARRC Sister-in-Charge, Territorial Force Nursing Service
- Catherine Isabel Scoble ARRC Nursing Sister, Canadian Army Medical Corps
- Kathleen Marie Smith ARRC Matron, Territorial Force Nursing Service
- Jean Taggart ARRC Sister-in-Charge, Civil Hospital Reserve
- Beatrice Jane Tanner, Acting Sister, Queen Alexandra's Imperial Military Nursing Service Reserve
- Ada Constance Winifred Teevan ARRC Acting Matron, Queen Alexandra's Imperial Military Nursing Service
- Lilian Florence Wheatley, Acting Sister, Civil Hospital Reserve
- Martha Whent ARRC Matron, British Red Cross Society
- Ada White, Sister-in-Charge, Territorial Force Nursing Service
- Isobel Mary Whyte ARRC Acting Matron, Queen Alexandra's Imperial Military Nursing Service
- Minnie Wood ARRC Sister in Charge, Queen Alexandra's Imperial Military Nursing Service
- Lilian Olmeira Doughty-Wylie MBE Matron, Limenaria Hospital, Thasos

In recognition of valuable services with the British Forces in Egypt:

- Eva Helen Chapman, Head Sister, Australian Army Nursing Service
- Rose Creal, Matron, Army Auxiliary Nursing Service
- Edith Margaret Davenport, Staff Nurse (Acting Sister), Queen Alexandra's Imperial Military Nursing Service Reserve
- Alice Maud Hanrahan, Staff Nurss, Queen Alexandra's Imperial Military Nursing Service Reserve
- Helena Jane Mooney, Matron, Egyptian Government Hospital, Suez
- Beatrice Sanderson, Staff Nurse (Acting Sister), Territorial Force Nursing Service

In recognition of valuable services with the British Forces in Italy:

- Julia Mary Hart, Head Sister, Army Auxiliary Nursing Service
- Mary Davidson Woodhouse ARRC Matron, Queen Alexandra's Imperial Military Nursing Service

In recognition of their valuable services with the British Forces in Salonika:

- Winifred Maude Bickham, Assist. Matron, Territorial Force Nursing Service
- Rose Hannah Black, Sister, Territorial Force Nursing Service
- Ida Florence Brooke, Sister, Queen Alexandra's Imperial Military Nursing Service Reserve
- Dora Frederica Chapman ARRC Sister, Territorial Force Nursing Service
- Helen Muriel Lancashire Cox, Sister, Territorial Force Nursing Service
- Lilian Maud Holden, Sister, Territorial Force Nursing Service
- Edith Gertrude Kilburn, Sister, Territorial Force Nursing Service
- Sara Lewis, Sister, Territorial Force Nursing Service
- Alice Marion Prichard, Temp Matron, Army Auxiliary Nursing Service
- Adelaide Bertha Russell, Sister, Queen Alexandra's Imperial Military Nursing Service Reserve
- Ethelda Runnalls Uren, Matron, Army Auxiliary Nursing Service
- Alice Mary Josephine Walpole, Sister, Queen Alexandra's Imperial Military Nursing Service Reserve

=== Second Class (ARRC) ===
- Annie Alexander MM Sister, British Red Cross Society
- Hilda Mary Alford, Staff Nurse, Queen Alexandra's Imperial Military Nursing Service Reserve
- Gertrude Jessie Andrews, Temp Head Sister, Army Auxiliary Nursing Service
- Mary Arbuthnot, Voluntary Aid Detachment
- Ellen Armstrong, Acting Sister, Queen Alexandra's Imperial Military Nursing Service Reserve
- Maude Gertrude Atkinson, Sister, New Zealand Army Nursing Service
- Edith Aylett, Acting Sister, Queen Alexandra's Imperial Military Nursing Service Reserve
- Blanche Baldwin, Nurse, Voluntary Aid Detachment
- Annie Barrett, Sister, Territorial Force Nursing Service
- Mary Victoria Bean, Acting Sister, Civil Hospital Reserve
- Winifred Adela Beausire, Assistant Nurse, Voluntary Aid Detachment
- Emily Margaret Vivian Berry, Nurse, Voluntary Aid Detachment
- Charlotte Irene Black, Acting Sister, Queen Alexandra's Imperial Military Nursing Service Reserve
- Mary Blamire-Brown, Acting Sister, Civil Queen Alexandra's Imperial Military Nursing Service Reserve
- Annie Laura Bradley, Nursing Sister, Canadian Hospital Reserve
- Dorothy Botting, Queen Alexandra's Imperial Military Nursing Service Reserve Staff Nurse
- Annie Black Boyd, Staff Nurse, Army Medical Corps
- Florence Broome MM Acting Sister, Queen Alexandra's Imperial Military Nursing Service Reserve
- Ada Isabella Burton, Acting Sister, Civil Hospital Reserve
- Annie Hudkinson Calder, Acting Sister, Civil Hospital Reserve
- Lily Calyert, Nursing Sister, Territorial Force Nursing Service
- Elizabeth Vera Cameron, Nursing Sister, Canadian Army Medical Corps
- Louisa C. Chamberlain, Nursing Sister, Queen Alexandra's Royal Naval Nursing Service, Reserve
- Lilian Mary Clieve, Sister-in-Charge, Territorial Force Nursing Service
- Mary Emily Colston, Acting Sister, Civil Hospital Reserve
- Eileen Love Connolly, Sister, Army Auxiliary Nursing Service
- Norah Connolly, Acting Sister, Civil Hospital Reserve
- Edith Annie Church Court, Nurse, Voluntary Aid Detachment
- Caroline Eddington Crawford, Sister-in-Charge, Queen Alexandra's Imperial Military Nursing Service Reserve
- Jessie Cummings, Acting Sister, Queen Alexandra's Imperial Military Nursing Service Reserve
- Emily Marion Rosetta Currie, Staff Nurse, South African Medical Nursing Service
- Emma Argyle Cuthbert, Head Sister, Army Auxiliary Nursing Service
- Marjorie Hamilton Dalrymple, Nurse, Voluntary Aid Detachment
- Charlotte Louise Fitzgerald Dalton, Nurse, Voluntary Aid Detachment
- Mary Kathleen Daly, Staff Nurse, Queen Alexandra's Imperial Military Nursing Service Reserve
- Ruby Dalzell, Acting Sister, Queen Alexandra's Imperial Military Nursing Service Reserve
- Georgina Davidson, Sister, Harvard Unit
- Ina Docherty, Matron, General Hospital, Great Yarmouth
- Caroline Agnes Donnelly, Nursing Sister, Canadian Army Medical Corps
- Ethel Laura Dowling, Charge Sister, British Red Cross Society
- Alice Catherine Doyle, Nursing Sister, Canadian Army Medical Corps
- Rebecca Draper, Sister, Territorial Force Nursing Service
- Rachel, Countess of Dudley CBE Honorary Lady Superintendent
- Helena Elizabeth Dulmage, Matron, Canadian Army Medical Corps
- Mary Elizabeth Forrest Earle, Assistant Nurse, Voluntary Aid Detachment
- Mary Edgar, Head Sister, London Homoeopathic Hospital, Great Ormond Street
- Miss Edwardes, Matron RN Convalescent Hospital, Great Malvern
- Gladys Lilian Ellis, Nurse, Voluntary Aid Detachment
- Nellie Josephine Enright, Nursing Sister, Canadian Army Medical Corps
- Mary Ramage Fairbairn, Acting Sister, Civil Hospital Reserve
- Marie Ruth Fielding, Sister, Army Auxiliary Nursing Service
- Mary Ellen Fisher, Staff Nurse, Army Auxiliary Nursing Service
- May Francis, Sister, British Red Cross Society
- Alma Ethel May Furniss, Staff Nurse, Army Auxiliary Nursing Service
- Ada Baker Gabriel, Acting Sister, Queen Alexandra's Imperial Military Nursing Service Reserve
- Caroline Gerrard, Staff Nurse, Civil Hospital
- Ada Alice Maude Gibson, Staff Nurse, Territorial Force Nursing Service
- Sylvia Mary Glossop, Nurse, Voluntary Aid Detachment
- Elizabeth Goold, Acting Sister, Queen Alexandra's Imperial Military Nursing Service Reserve
- Edith Wastie Green, Nurse, Voluntary Aid Detachment
- Mabel Mary Gregson, Acting Sister, Queen Alexandra's Imperial Military Nursing Service Reserve
- Elsie Stewart Greig, Sister, Army Auxiliary Nursing Service
- Sybil Anna Grey, Acting Sister, Civil Hospital Reserve
- Annie Haigh, Assistant Nurse, Voluntary Aid Detachment
- Alice Maud Hall, Acting Sister, Queen Alexandra's Imperial Military Nursing Service Reserve
- Susan Hall, Acting Sister, Queen Alexandra's Imperial Military Nursing Service Reserve
- Kathleen Agnes Hallett, Charge Sister, British Red Cross Society
- Rachel Mary Hamlyn, Assistant Nurse, Voluntary Aid Detachment
- Millicent Rutherford-Hams, Nursing Sister, Royal Air Force Hospital, Vendome
- Elizabeth Davidson Harper, Acting Sister, Civil Hospital Reserve
- Barbara Evelyne Harrison, Sister, Territorial Force Nursing Service
- Kate Elizabeth Haywood, Acting Sister, Civil Hospital Reserve
- Alice Miriam Hearn, Sister, Territorial Force Nursing Service
- Ethel Maud Henbrey, Acting Sister, Queen Alexandra's Imperial Military Nursing Service Reserve
- Florence May Hepburn, Acting Sister, Civil Hospital Reserve
- Lilian Rosa Hill, Assistant Matron, Territorial Force Nursing Service
- Helen Marie Maud Homan, Sister, Army Auxiliary Nursing Service
- Annie Graham Horn, Sister, Territorial Force Nursing Service
- Blanche Marion Huddleston, Sister, New Zealand Army Nursing Service
- Margaret Hughes, Sister, Territorial Force Nursing Service
- Sarah Gwendoline Ireland, Acting Sister, Civil Hospital Reserve
- Barbara Jeffries, Voluntary Aid Detachment
- Elizabeth Jenkin, Sister, Territorial Force Nursing Service
- Mabel Georgina Clementine Johnson, Nurse, Voluntary Aid Detachment
- Charlotte Edith Jones, Acting Sister, Civil Hospital Reserve
- Hannah Jones, Sister, Territorial Force Nursing Service
- Harriet Emma Constance Jukes, Nursing Sister, Canadian Army Medical Corps
- Lucy Sinton Kelly, Staff Nurse, Queen Alexandra's Imperial Military Nursing Service Reserve
- Ethel Kenna, Charge Sister, British Red Cross Society
- John Kennard, Voluntary Aid Detachment
- Lady Elizabeth Mary Gertrude Keppel, Nurse, Voluntary Aid Detachment
- Agnes Margaret Kinnear, Acting Sister, Queen Alexandra's Imperial Military Nursing Service Reserve
- May Kirkham, Charge Sister, British Red Cross Society
- Ada Mabel Mary Langmaid, Staff Nurse, Queen Alexandra's Imperial Military Nursing Service Reserve
- Gwendoline Irene Lardner, Assistant Matron, Queen Alexandra's Imperial Military Nursing Service Reserve
- Catherine Jane Lewis, Staff Nurse, Queen Alexandra's Imperial Military Nursing Service Reserve
- Mary Haig Lindsay, Sister, Territorial Force Nursing Service
- Janet Linton, Sister, Territorial Force Nursing Service
- Agnes Maria Lithgow, Acting Sister, Civil Hospital Reserve
- Mary Matilda Little, Territorial Force Nursing Service
- Lima Gertrude Lovell, Sister, Army Auxiliary Nursing Service
- Eva Isobel MacDonald, Staff Nurse, Army Auxiliary Nursing Service
- Margaret MacDonald, Nursing Sister, Canadian Army Medical Corps
- Sarah Catherine MacIsaac, Matron, Canadian Army Medical Corps
- Agnes Gertrude MacMahon, Acting Sister, Queen Alexandra's Imperial Military Nursing Service Reserve
- Christina McLeod Macrae, Acting Sister, Queen Alexandra's Imperial Military Nursing Service Reserve
- Jessie Buchanan McDonald, Sister, Army Auxiliary Nursing Service
- Elizabeth McDougall, Nursing Sister, Canadian Army Medical Corps
- Nina McGregor, Nursing Sister, Territorial Force Nursing Service
- Anna Bella McLeod, Sister, Territorial Force Nursing Service
- Annie Smith McMillan, Sister, Territorial Force Nursing Service
- Mary McPherson, Nursing Sister, Canadian Army Medical Corps
- Violet May Marsh, Acting Sister, Queen Alexandra's Imperial Military Nursing Service Reserve
- Amy Ann Martin, Nursing Sister, Territorial Force Nursing Service
- Dora Mason, Acting Sister, Civil Hospital Reserve
- Dolores Hope Massy, Nursing Sister, Canadian Army Medical Corps
- Mary Jean Mathewson, Sister, Territorial Force Nursing Service
- Annie Fisher Mitchell, Nursing Sister, Canadian Army Medical Corps
- Annie Linaker Molyneux, Sister, Territorial Force Nursing Service
- Florence Annie Morgan, Acting Sister, Civil Hospital Reserve
- Ellen Watson Munro, Charge Sister, British Red Cross Society
- Annie Henrietta Murray, Sister, St. John's Ambulance Brigade
- Kathleen O'Connell, Staff Nurse, Queen Alexandra's Imperial Military Nursing Service Reserve
- Catherine O'Connor, Sister, Army Auxiliary Nursing Service
- Mary O'Dowd, Acting Sister, Queen Alexandra's Imperial Military Nursing Service Reserve
- Gladys Gertrude Parry, Acting Sister, Civil Hospital Reserve
- Ethel Theodora Paynter, Nursing Sister, Canadian Army Medical Corps
- Gertrude Annie Peters, Nurse, Voluntary Aid Detachment
- Margaret Phee, Staff Nurse, Queen Alexandra's Imperial Military Nursing Service Reserve
- Catherine Sarah Elizabeth Pierce, Sister, Territorial Force Nursing Service
- Edith Pilkington, Acting Sister, Queen Alexandra's Imperial Military Nursing Service Reserve
- Helen Mary Porteous, Assistant Matron, Queen Alexandra's Imperial Military Nursing Service Reserve
- Winifred Poste, Sister, British Red Cross Society
- Isabel Mary Thurlow Prior, Acting Sister, Civil Hospital Reserve
- Lucy Rangecroft, Sister, Territorial Force Nursing Service
- Gertrude Francis Reid, Nursing Sister, Canadian Army Medical Corps
- Katherine Reid, Nursing Sister, Canadian Army Medical Corps
- Mabel Hall Reynar, Nursing Sister, Canadian Army Medical Corps
- Margaret Sophie Riddell, Matron, British Red Cross Society
- Margaret Jane Riddle, Nursing Sister, Canadian Army Medical Corps
- Jean Robertson, Sister, Territorial Force Nursing Service
- Leah Rosenthal, Acting Sister, Queen Alexandra's Imperial Military Nursing Service Reserve
- Rosa Rothwell, Staff Nurse, Queen Alexandra's Imperial Military Nursing Service Reserve
- Muriel Gladys Rowe, Acting Sister, Civil Hospital Reserve
- Elizabeth Sandford MBE Assistant Matron, Limenaria Hospital, Thasos
- Ethel Shepherd, Assistant Nurse, Voluntary Aid Detachment
- Kate Skinner, Sister-in-Charge, Queen Alexandra's Imperial Military Nursing Service Reserve
- Edith Lilly Smith, Acting Sister, Queen Alexandra's Imperial Military Nursing Service Reserve
- Ethel Smith, Sister, Army Auxiliary Nursing Service
- Elizabeth Spensley, Acting Sister, Queen Alexandra's Imperial Military Nursing Service Reserve
- Sarah Eleanor Steenson, Acting Sister, Civil Hospital Reserve
- Mildred Susanne Stewart, Acting Sister, Civil Hospital Reserve
- Constance Adelaide Stone, Sister, Army Auxiliary Nursing Service
- Eliza Stones, Acting Sister, Queen Alexandra's Imperial Military Nursing Service Reserve
- Isabella Carr Stratton, Sister, Territorial Force Nursing Service
- Amy Sarah Stuart, Acting Sister, Queen Alexandra's Imperial Military Nursing Service Reserve
- Gladys Kate Thewles, Acting Sister, Civil Hospital Reserve
- Blanche Gertrude Thornton, Nursing Sister, South African Medical Nursing Service
- Edith lona Tillard, Nurse, Voluntary Aid Detachment
- Lilian Mary Trotter, Charge Sister, British Red Cross Society
- Ruth Turner, Staff Nurse, Civil Hospital Reserve
- Jane Hope Urquhart, Nurse, Voluntary Aid Detachment
- Edith Hannah Usher, Nurse, Voluntary Aid Detachment
- Hilda Caroline Gwenda Verschoyle, Assistant Nurse. Spec. Probationer
- Margaret Walker, Sister, Territorial Force Nursing Service
- Una Mary Ward, Assistant Nurse, Voluntary Aid Detachment
- Ruby Charlotte Warner, Assistant Nurse, Voluntary Aid Detachment
- Ivy Gertrude Waters, Nursing Sister, South African Medical Nursing Service
- Christina Mary Watling, Nursing Sister, Canadian Army Medical Corps
- Edith Katherine Mercedes Weston, Nurse, Voluntary Aid Detachment
- Gladys Laura White, Sister, British Red Cross Society
- Edith Catherine Whitlan, Nursing Sister, Canadian Army Medical Corps
- Maude Elizabeth Wilkin, Sister, Queen Alexandra's Imperial Military Nursing Service
- Nellie Williams, Staff Nurse, Territorial Force Nursing Service
- Edith Wood, Sister, Territorial Force Nursing Service
- Maude Wright, Nursing Sister, Canadian Army Medical Corps
- Margaret Arnott Yule, Sister, Territorial Force Nursing Service
- Dora Lund, Nursing Sister, Queen Alexandra's Royal Naval Nursing Service, Reserve
- Nance McKay, Nursing Sister, Queen Alexandra's Royal Naval Nursing Service, Reserve
- Mabel Rose Chester-Webb, Nursing Sister, Queen Alexandra's Royal Naval Nursing Service, Reserve
- Margaret Hunt, Nursing Sister, Queen Alexandra's Royal Naval Nursing Service, Reserve
- Lilian Swift, Nursing Sister, Queen Alexandra's Royal Naval Nursing Service, Reserve
- Elizabeth Wright Jones, Matron, Monkstown Hospital, Kingstown
- Jessie Annie Mortlock, Matron, Brooksby Hospital, Leicestershire

In recognition of valuable services with the British Forces in Egypt:

- Jane Bell, Sister, Territorial Force Nursing Service
- Louise Bennett, Assistant Matron, Queen Alexandra's Imperial Military Nursing Service Reserve
- Emily Bishop, Sister, Queen Alexandra's Imperial Military Nursing Service Reserve
- Elizabeth Brown, Staff Nurse, Queen Alexandra's Imperial Military Nursing Service Reserve
- Grace Helena Burns, Sister, Army Auxiliary Nursing Service
- Ruby Thomson Cameron, Staff Nurse, Queen Alexandra's Imperial Military Nursing Service Reserve
- Annie Edith Cheetham, Nurse, Voluntary Aid Detachment
- Mary Clayden, Sister, Queen Alexandra's Imperial Military Nursing Service Reserve
- Benigna Coffey, Sister, Queen Alexandra's Imperial Military Nursing Service Reserve
- Margaret Coombes, Nurse, Voluntary Aid Detachment
- Sarah Annie Cowell, Sister, Queen Alexandra's Imperial Military Nursing Service Reserve
- Katherine Mary Duckworth, Nurse, Voluntary Aid Detachment
- Matilda Fleming, Sister, Queen Alexandra's Imperial Military Nursing Service Reserve
- Louisa Fox, Sister, Queen Alexandra's Imperial Military Nursing Service Reserve
- Isabel Jackson, Sister, Queen Alexandra's Imperial Military Nursing Service Reserve
- Laura Lamonby, Nurse, Voluntary Aid Detachment
- Alma Louise Lee, Sister, Queen Alexandra's Imperial Military Nursing Service Reserve
- Janetta Thornton Leechman, Sister, Queen Alexandra's Imperial Military Nursing Service Reserve
- Isabel Montford, Nurse, Voluntary Aid Detachment
- Elsie Louise Moseley, Nurse, Voluntary Aid Detachment
- Mary Eveline Nicholson, Sister, Army Auxiliary Nursing Service
- Mary Scanlan, Sister, Queen Alexandra's Imperial Military Nursing Service Reserve
- Winifred Merlina Scott, Sister, Army Auxiliary Nursing Service
- Elizabeth Douglas Simson, Sister, Queen Alexandra's Imperial Military Nursing Service Reserve
- Maud Antrobus Wardlaw, Matron, Egyptian Government Hospital, Alexandria
- Annie Weir, Sister, Territorial Force Nursing Service
- Cecil Witherington, Assistant Matron, Queen Alexandra's Imperial Military Nursing Service Reserve
- Margaret Woods, Head Sister, Army Auxiliary Nursing Service

In recognition of valuable services with the British Forces in Italy:

- Edith Doris Altham, Sister, Queen Alexandra's Imperial Military Nursing Service Reserve
- Helena Lucy Davies, Sister, Queen Alexandra's Imperial Military Nursing Service Reserve
- Lily Mackenzie, Staff Nurse, Army Auxiliary Nursing Service
- Grace McPherson, Sister, Territorial Force Nursing Service
- Mary Jane Powell, Sister, Queen Alexandra's Imperial Military Nursing Service Reserve

In recognition of their valuable services with the British Forces in Salonika:

- Portia Mary Lewis Batley, Staff Nurse, Territorial Force Nursing Service
- Jessie Macdonald Baxter, Sister, Army Auxiliary Nursing Service
- Ada Mary Bennett, Staff Nurse, Territorial Force Nursing Service
- Gladys Marguerite Bowes, Nurse, Voluntary Aid Detachment, British Red Cross Society
- Florence Bertha Bussell, Sister, Queen Alexandra's Imperial Military Nursing Service Reserve
- Beatrice Mary Chadwick, Staff Nurse, Territorial Force Nursing Service
- Agnes Divine, Sister, Territorial Force Nursing Service
- Natalie Theodora Dodd, Nurse, Voluntary Aid Detachment, St. John's Ambulance Brigade
- Elizabeth Helen Draper, Sister, Army Auxiliary Nursing Service
- Adelaide Jenkins Eves, Sister, Queen Alexandra's Imperial Military Nursing Service Reserve
- Loretta Johanna Fogarty, Sister, Queen Alexandra's Imperial Military Nursing Service Reserve
- Hilda Mary Gerrard, Nurse, Voluntary Aid Detachment
- Ethel Mary Ann Giddings, Sister, Army Auxiliary Nursing Service
- Susannah Haig, Sister, Queen Alexandra's Imperial Military Nursing Service Reserve
- Minnie Hartley, Sister, Queen Alexandra's Imperial Military Nursing Service Reserve
- Lizzie Richardson Henderson, Staff Nurse, Queen Alexandra's Imperial Military Nursing Service Reserve
- Florence Jackson, Sister, Queen Alexandra's Imperial Military Nursing Service Reserve
- Gladys Webster Jarrett, Staff Nurse, Army Auxiliary Nursing Service
- Deborah Anne Ladbrook, Sister, Territorial Force Nursing Service
- Harriet Pears Lauder, Sister, Territorial Force Nursing Service
- Rosina McClure MacMorland, Sister, Queen Alexandra's Imperial Military Nursing Service Reserve
- Marion Russell McMillan, Sister, Territorial Force Nursing Service
- Ethel May Meade, Staff Nurse, Army Auxiliary Nursing Service
- Minnie Victoria Mears, Sister, Army Auxiliary Nursing Service
- Nona Molson, Superintendent, Voluntary Aid Detachment, British Red Cross Society
- Margaret Moody, Sister, Territorial Force Nursing Service
- Christabel Ada Nekrews, Staff Nurse, Queen Alexandra's Imperial Military Nursing Service Reserve
- Ethel Blanche Philps, Staff Nurse, Territorial Force Nursing Service
- Gertrude Pugh, Staff Nurse, Territorial Force Nursing Service
- Helen Mary Ripper, Sister, Queen Alexandra's Imperial Military Nursing Service Reserve
- Nellie Roberts, Sister, Queen Alexandra's Imperial Military Nursing Service Reserve
- Lilian Jane Rutherford, Staff Nurse, Army Auxiliary Nursing Service
- Jessie Dow Scott, Sister, Queen Alexandra's Imperial Military Nursing Service Reserve
- Theresa Frances Sephton, Sister, Queen Alexandra's Imperial Military Nursing Service Reserve
- Ethel Jeannette Softer, Sister, Army Auxiliary Nursing Service
- Adela Stones, Sister, Queen Alexandra's Imperial Military Nursing Service Reserve
- Dorothy Elizabeth Taylor, Staff Nurse, Queen Alexandra's Imperial Military Nursing Service Reserve
- Isabella Thomson, Sister, Queen Alexandra's Imperial Military Nursing Service Reserve
- Mary Anable Walker, Staff Nurse, Territorial Force Nursing Service
- Selina Elizabeth Bellona Watkins, Sister, Territorial Force Nursing Service
- Annie Elizabeth West, Staff Nurse, Army Auxiliary Nursing Service
- May Florence Young, Sister, Army Auxiliary Nursing Service

=== Awarded a Bar to the Royal Red Cross (RRC*) ===
- Annie Warren Gill RRC Lady Superintendent of Nurses, Royal Infirmary, Edinburgh
- Helena Hartigan RRC Acting Principal Matron, Queen Alexandra's Imperial Military Nursing Service
- Gertrude Mary Smith RRC Acting Matron, Queen Alexandra's Imperial Military Nursing Service
- Catherine Geddes Stronach RRC Acting Principal Matron, Queen Alexandra's Imperial Military Nursing Service
- Mabel Mary Tunley RRC Acting Principal Matron, Queen Alexandra's Imperial Military Nursing Service

In recognition of valuable services with the British Forces in Egypt:

- Janet Erskine Dods RRC Matron, Queen Alexandra's Imperial Military Nursing Service
- Daisy Millicent Catherine Michell RRC Sister, Queen Alexandra's Imperial Military Nursing Service
- Marie Elsbeth Neville RRC Sister, Queen Alexandra's Imperial Military Nursing Service
- Agnes Weir RRC Sister, Queen Alexandra's Imperial Military Nursing Service

== Kaisar-i-Hind Medal ==
First Class

- Sarah Isabel Hatch, Canadian Baptist Telugu Mission, Madras
- Mahomedbhoy Currimbhoy, Merchant, Bombay
- Pandita Ramabai, Bombay, Alfred Donald Pickford, Begg, Dunlop & Company, Calcutta, Bengal
- Lala Mul Chand Thakral, Multan, Punjab
- Amedee George Du Bern, Managing Partner, D. Bern and Company, Burma
- Gertrude Davis, Principal Matron, Australian Army Nursing Service, Victoria War Hospital, Bombay
- John Dodds Price, Officiating Civil Surgeon, Nowgong, Assam

== Medal of the Order of the British Empire ==
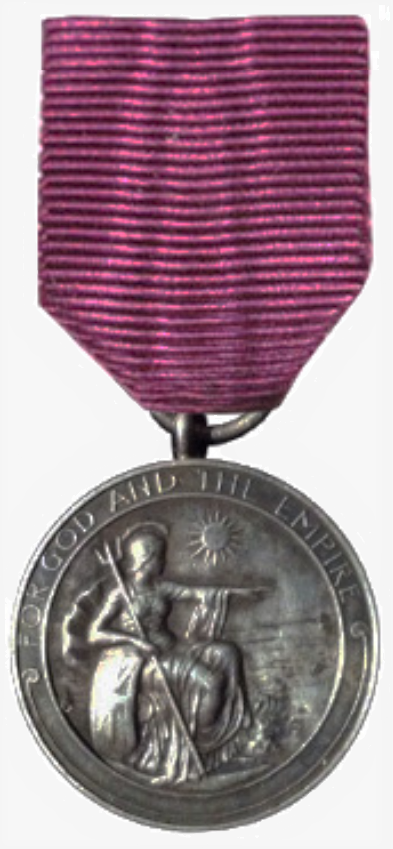
Medal of the Order of the British Empire

=== Military Division ===
For services in connection with the War.

- 2nd Mate Neil Campbell
- Chief Writer Bernard Higgins, Royal Naval Volunteer Reserve
- 3rd Writer Sidney Edward Illman
- Fireman Arthur James Knubley, M.M.R
- Chief Writer Stanley George Hoare Leyh

== Distinguished Service Order (DSO) ==
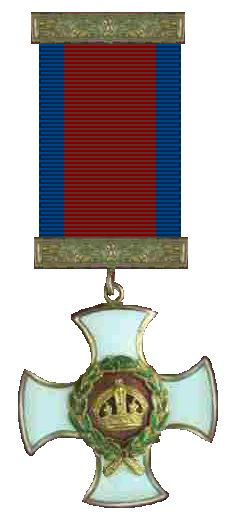
Riband and Badge of the Distinguished Service Order

- Vice-Admiral Godfrey Harry Brydges Mundy CB MVO
- Rear-Admiral Charles William Keighly-Peach
- Commander Frederic Giffard RN
- Commander Charles Frederic Roy Cowan RN
- Lieutenant-Commander Charles Tiedmann Gervers RN
- Lieutenant-Commander Cyril Goolden RN
- Lieutenant-Commander Rowland Kyrle Cecil Pope RN
- Surgeon Lieutenant-Commander Henry Dennis Drennan RN
- Major Robert Jackson Adams, Royal Horse and Royal Field Artillery, attd. 331st (East Lancaster) Brigade, Royal Field Artillery
- Major James Agnew, 1/5th Battalion, Argyll and Sutherland Highlanders
- Captain Alexander Claud Allan MC Cameron Highlanders
- Temp Captain Albert George Allen MC General List
- Major and Brevet Lieutenant-Colonel Reginald Seymour Allen, Hampshire Regiment
- Captain John Angell MC Dorsetshire Regiment and Machine Gun Corps
- Major and Brevet Lieutenant-Colonel Edgar Carnegie Anstey, Royal Artillery
- Temp Major Alec Hutchinson Ashcroft, 7th Battalion, South Staffordshire Regiment
- Captain Richard Romer Claude Baggallay MC 1st Battalion, Irish Guards
- Captain Charles Lane Bagnall MC 9th Battalion, Durham Light Infantry, attd. 50th Divisional Signals Company, Royal Engineers
- Temp Major James Yescombe Baldwin, Army Cyclist Corps
- Major George Richard Balston, Royal Field Artillery, attd. 92nd Brigade, Royal Field Artillery
- Captain James Barkley, Royal Army Medical Corps, attd. 2/3rd (Home Counties) Field Ambulance, Royal Army Medical Corps
- Major John Frederick Barrington, Royal Garrison Artillery, attd. Headquarters, 71st Brigade, Royal Garrison Artillery
- Major Arthur Frederick Bayley, Royal Artillery, attd. 307th (South Midland) Brigade, Royal Field Artillery
- Temp Captain James Arthur Bennewith, 8th Battalion, Tank Corps
- Major Hubert Lyle Bingay, Royal Engineers
- Captain and Brevet Major Frederic William Lyon Bissett MC Duke of Cornwall's Light Infantry
- Lieutenant Archie Vyvyan Board MC Essex Regiment and Machine Gun Corps
- Captain Herbert William Bolton, Royal West Surrey Regiment
- Captain Edward de Winton Herbert Bradley MC 2nd Battalion, Yorkshire Light Infantry
- Captain William Picton Bradley-Williams, 2nd Battalion, Yorkshire Light Infantry, attd. 5th Battalion, Border Regiment
- Temp Captain George Bradstock MC 407th Battery, 96th Brigade, Royal Field Artillery
- Major Henry Russell Brancker, 87th Brigade, Royal Garrison Artillery
- Temp Major Geoffrey Armstrong Buddie MC 86th Field Company, Royal Engineers
- Captain Sidney Waterfield Bunker MC Royal Fusiliers, employed Spec. Brigade, Royal Engineers
- Temp Major James Charles Burdett MC 6th Battalion, Leicestershire Regiment
- Captain Robert Burgess MC Royal Army Medical Corps, attd. 24th (1/1st Wessex) Field Ambulance
- Major William Mahony Butler, King Edward's Horse and 12th Battalion, Tank Corps
- Major Alexander Callam Royal Army Medical Corps, attd. 1/1st (East Lancaster) Field Ambulance
- Captain James Olpherts Campbell MC B/88th Brigade, Royal Field Artillery
- Temp Major Alfred Edward Carr MC 1st Field Company, Tank Corps
- Captain Bertram Abbott Carr, Royal Garrison Artillery, attd. 170th Siege Battery, Royal Garrison Artillery
- Captain Cyril Rodney Carter, 1st Battalion, Royal Lancaster Regiment
- Captain and Brevet Major Francis George Chalmer MC Royal Highlanders, attd. 9th Battalion, Machine Gun Corps
- Temp Captain Randolph Arthur Chell MC General List
- Temp Captain Peter Temple Chevallier MC General List
- Temp Captain James Archibald Church MC 251st Tunneling Company, Royal Engineers
- Temp Captain Charles Willoughby Clark MC Tank Corps
- Temp Captain Percy William Clark MC Royal Engineers
- Temp Lieutenant Wilfrid Bairstow Clarkson, 141st Siege Battery, Royal Garrison Artillery
- Temp Major Hamilton Clendining, 10th Battalion, attd. 22nd Battalion, Royal Irish Rifles
- Captain Eric Charles Clifford MC Royal Field Artillery, attd. C/150th Battery, Royal Field Artillery
- Captain Hugh Murchison Clowes, 14th Battalion, London Regiment
- Captain Lee Danby Buxton Cogan, 88th Field Ambulance, Royal Army Medical Corps
- Major Francis Lane Congreve MC Royal Field Artillery Headquarters, 155th A. Brigade, Royal Field Artillery
- Temp Captain Frederick Charles Cook MC 209th Field Company, Royal Engineers
- Temp Captain John Campbell Cooke MC General List
- Temp Lieutenant Arthur George Coombs, 113th Siege Battery, Royal Garrison Artillery
- Lieutenant-Colonel William Francis Taylor Corrie, Royal Garrison Artillery Headquarters, 69th Brigade
- Major Lannoy John Coussmaker MC Royal Engineers (T.P.)
- Major Edward Harvie Cox 2/3rd (East Lancaster) Field Ambulance, Royal Army Medical Corps
- Temp Captain Ian Cairns Cowan MC General List
- Major diaries Joseph Edmonstoune Cranstoun, 1/1st Lanarkshire Yeomanry, attd. 6th Battalion, Gordon Highlanders
- Major Frederick William Beresford Cripps, Gloucestershire Hussars Yeomanry
- Temp Major Desmond Warwick Croft MC South Wales Borderers, late 5th Battalion
- Major and Brevet Lieutenant-Colonel Arthur Crookenden, Cheshire Regiment
- Major Denis Daly MC Royal Garrison Artillery, attd. 17th Brigade, Royal Field Artillery
- Temp Major Henry William Gifford Dansey, General List
- Captain Francis Henry Norman Davidson MC Royal Field Artillery
- Lieutenant James Onslow Kingsmill Delap, Royal Garrison Artillery, attd. 303rd Siege Battery, Royal Garrison Artillery
- Captain John Finlay Dew MC Scottish Rifles
- Major Vincent Hamilton Dickson, C/330th Brigade (East Lancaster), Royal Field Artillery
- Captain Wadham Heathcote Diggle MC Coldstream Guards
- Captain John Marsh Diggles MC 6th Battalion, Cheshire Regiment
- Captain Francis George Dobson Royal Army Medical Corps, attd. 1/2nd (West Riding) Field Ambulance
- Temp Lieutenant-Colonel Robert Cooper Drury, Royal Field Artillery, attd. 50th (Nbrn) Divisional Artillery Column, Royal Field Artillery
- Lieutenant-Colonel Arthur Dugdale CMG Oxfordshire Hussars Yeomanry
- Major William McCombie Duguid-McCombie, 2nd Dragoons
- Captain and Brevet Major Jesse Pevensey Duke MC Royal Warwickshire Regiment
- Captain Thomas Ingram Dun MC Royal Army Medical Corps
- Captain and Brevet Major William Edmonstone Duncan MC Royal Field Artillery
- Captain Charles William Eames Royal Army Medical Corps, attd. 2/2nd (West Riding) Field Ambulance
- Major Clive Thornley Edmunds, 57th Field Ambulance, Royal Army Medical Corps
- Temp Major Cyril Ernest Edwards MC 26th Battalion, Royal Fusiliers
- Lieutenant William John Eldridge MC 90th Siege Battery, Royal Garrison Artillery
- Lieutenant-Colonel John Evans, 1/2nd Battalion, Monmouthshire Regiment
- Major Charles Julius Everard, 60th Siege Battery, Royal Garrison Artillery
- Major Henry Nevill Fairbank MC attd. 174th Brigade, Royal Field Artillery
- Temp Major Arthur Edward Bruce Fielding, 63rd Field Company, Royal Engineers
- Temp Major Edwin Finn, 21st Battalion, West Yorkshire Regiment
- Major John Lachlan Forbes MC 16th Siege Battery, Royal Garrison Artillery
- Major William Henry Forsyth 38th Field Ambulance, Royal Army Medical Corps
- Captain and Brevet Major Gerald Ian Gartlan MC Royal Irish Rifles
- Major Lionel Gascoigne, B/170th Brigade, Royal Field Artillery
- Captain Gerard Edward James Gent MC 3rd Battalion, Duke of Cornwall's Light Infantry, attd. 1st Battalion
- Major Ewen Grant, Lovat's Scouts Yeomanry
- Lieutenant-Colonel Charles Lloyd Rashleigh Gray, 63rd Brigade, Royal Garrison Artillery
- Captain William Edmund Gray MC Rifle Brigade and Machine Gun Corps
- Major Mancha Gregory MC Royal Field Artillery
- Captain Cyril James Anthony Griffin Royal Army Medical Corps, attd. 5th Cavalry Field Ambulance
- Captain Paul Gottlieb Julius Gnterbock MC 4th Battalion, Gloucestershire Regiment
- Captain Arthur Leslie Harman MC B Battery, 110th Brigade, Royal Field Artillery
- Temp Major John Cabourn Hartley, 4th Battalion, Royal Fusiliers
- Major Wilfred Percy Ashby Hattersley-Smith, 288th Siege Battery, Royal Garrison Artillery
- Lieutenant Hugh Douglas Hawkins, Royal Garrison Artillery, attd. 431st Siege Battery
- Major Norman Canning, Healing MC Royal Garrison Artillery
- Captain Cyril Helm MC 42nd Field Ambulance, Royal Army Medical Corps
- Major Neville George Bodleau Henderson, Royal Highlanders
- Captain John Victor Hermon, Cheshire Yeomanry, attd. 6th Dragoon Guards
- Lieutenant-Colonel Henry Heywood Heywood-Lonsdale, Shropshire Yeomanry
- Major John Pemberton Heywood Heywood-Lonsdale, Shropshire Yeomanry, attd. 10th Battalion, Shropshire Light Infantry
- Lieutenant William Edward Hicks MC 152nd Heavy Battery, Royal Garrison Artillery
- Major Lionel Henry Hickson, Royal West Kent Regiment
- Major Rowley Richard Hill, 58th A. Brigade, Royal Garrison Artillery
- Captain and Brevet Major Edward Norman Fortescue Hitchins MC West Riding Regiment, attd. 41st Divisional Signals Company, Royal Engineers
- Captain and Brevet Major James Wilfred Lang Stanley Hobart MC North Staffordshire Regiment
- Lieutenant John William Hoggart MC C/50th Brigade, Royal Field Artillery
- Temp Major Hugh Moritz Holland, Royal Garrison Artillery, attd. Headquarters, III Corps
- Captain Lord Hans Wellesley Holmpatrick MC 16th Lancers
- Temp Major Ernest Eric Ferris Home MC Royal Engineers
- Temp Captain Percy Frederick Hone MC General List, attd. 21st Battalion, Middlesex Regiment
- Major Maurice Henry Neville House, C Battery, 56th Brigade, Royal Field Artillery
- Captain Sidney Howes MC 21st Lancers
- Lieutenant-Colonel Arthur Bennison Hubback CMG 20th Battalion, London Regiment
- Major Kenneth Hunnybun, Army Cyclist Corps, attd. 7th Battalion, Somerset Light Infantry
- Major Cecil Jordan Ingleby, 4th Battalion, East Yorkshire Regiment
- Temp Lieutenant Joseph Boyd Irwin MC 1st Battalion, Royal Lancaster Regiment, attd. 12th Trench Mortar Battery
- Captain Reginald Neville Jackson, General List, attd. British Mission, French General Headquarters
- Lieutenant-Colonel Frederick William Jarvis, Suffolk Yeomanry
- Temp Captain George Francis Johnston MC 180th Tunneling Company, Royal Engineers
- Temp Lieutenant-Colonel d'Arcy Hemsworth Kay, 21st Battalion, Machine Gun Corps
- Captain David Robert Keir, 7th Battalion, Royal Highlanders,
- Lieutenant-Colonel Harry Joseph Kelsall, Royal Garrison Artillery, 12th Brigade
- Major Henry Maule Kemble, 45th Siege Battery, Royal Garrison Artillery
- Lieutenant James Benjamin Kindersley MC Royal Field Artillery
- Temp Lieutenant-Colonel Walter Diarmid Vere Oldham King, 17th Battalion, Northumberland Fusiliers
- Temp Captain Alexander Edmond Knight MC Royal Army Medical Corps
- Temp Lieutenant Reginald Coldham Knight MC 5th Brigade Headquarters, Tank Corps
- Captain Neville Ogilvie Laing, 4th Hussars
- Lieutenant James Lamond MC 2nd Battalion, Royal Scots, attd. 1/5th Battalion, South Staffordshire Regiment
- Captain Charles Llewellyn Lander MC Royal Army Medical Corps, attd. 2/3rd (S.M.) Field Ambulance, Royal Army Medical Corps
- Captain and Brevet Major Thomas Joseph Leahy MC Royal Dublin Fusiliers
- Lieutenant-Colonel Edward Carey le Pelley, Royal Garrison Artillery
- Lieutenant John Leslie MC 12th Lancers, attd. 6th Battalion, Tank Corps
- Captain Hugh Liddell MC 1/7th Battalion, Northumberland Fusiliers
- Major Robert Walton Ling MC Royal Horse and Royal Field Artillery
- Major and Brevet Lieutenant-Colonel Granville George Loch CMG Royal Scots
- Major John Fleming King Lockhart, Royal Field Artillery, attd. 312th (West Riding) Brigade, Royal Field Artillery
- Major Stuart Gerald McAllum Royal Army Medical Corps, attd. 140th Field Ambulance
- Captain Herbert Rochfort McCullagh, 2nd Battalion, Durham Light Infantry, attd. 19th Battalion
- Captain and Brevet Major Alastair Ian MacDougall MC 5th Lancers
- Captain Kenneth Ian McIver MC 135th Siege Battery, Royal Garrison Artillery
- Temp Captain Daniel MacKay MC C/165th Brigade, Royal Field Artillery
- Captain and Brevet Major Lionel de Amarel Mackenzie MC Gordon Highlanders
- Major Robert Harman Mackenzie MC Royal Engineers
- Lieutenant-Colonel Farquhar McLennan Royal Army Medical Corps
- Captain John MacMillan MC Royal Army Medical Corps, attd. 5th (London) Field Ambulance, Royal Army Medical Corps
- Captain Stuart Logan MacWatt MC 163rd Siege Battery, Royal Garrison Artillery
- Captain Bernard Oswald March MC Royal Field Artillery, attd. 158th A. Brigade
- Captain Gordon Spencer Marston MC Royal Engineers, attd. 234th Field Company, Royal Engineers
- Major Jeffery Eardley Marston MC Royal Artillery
- Temp Lieutenant-Colonel Charles Roswell Martin, 20th (S.) Battalion3 King's Royal Rifle Corps (Pioneers)
- Temp Major James Godfrey Martin MC 8th Battalion, North Staffordshire Regiment
- Temp Captain Herbert Marsh Sims Meares MC 55th Field Company, Royal Engineers
- Temp Captain Leslie Woodfield Mellonie MC 116th Heavy Battery, Royal Garrison Artillery
- Major William Rice Meredith, Royal Inniskilling Fusiliers
- Lieutenant Thomas Merrick MC attd. 87th Brigade, Royal Field Artillery
- Temp Major Charles Micklem, Royal Marine Artillery, No. 2 Howitzer
- Major George Ralph Miller, 23rd Brigade, Royal Field Artillery
- Captain Christopher Carroll Mitchell MC B/47th Brigade, Royal Field Artillery
- Captain Charles Willoughby Moke Norrie MC 11th Hussars
- Captain and Brevet Major Crawford Victor Monier-Williams MC York & Lancaster Regiment, secd, Royal Engineers Signal Service
- Major Archibald Digby Murray, Royal Garrison Artillery
- Captain Philip Stafford Myburgh MC A. Battery, 152nd Brigade, Royal Field Artillery
- Temp Captain Geoffrey Gay Nanson MC 3rd Siege Battery, Royal Garrison Artillery
- Captain George Travers Nugee MC 88th Battery 14th Brigade, Royal Field Artillery
- Captain Maurice Sarsfield Ormrod, 11th Battalion, King's Royal Rifle Corps
- Captain Charles Max Page FRCS Royal Army Medical Corps, attd. 90th Field Ambulance
- Temp Captain Montgomery Paterson Paton MC Royal Army Medical Corps
- Temp Major John William Balfour Paul, 18th Group Headquarters, Labour Corps
- Lieutenant-Colonel Wilfrid Evelyn Peal, Royal Field Artillery, attd. 123rd Brigade, Royal Field Artillery
- Captain Bertram Harris Hill Perry MC Royal Scots, attd. 8th Battalion, Royal Lancaster Regiment
- Temp Major Arthur Edward Phillips, 7th Battalion, Royal West Kent Regiment
- Temp Captain Frank Phillips MC General List
- Captain William Eric Phillips MC Leinster Regiment, attd. 2/6th Battalion, Royal Warwickshire Regiment
- Lieutenant Constantino James Phipps MC Liverpool Regiment, attd. Army Signal Service
- 2nd Lieutenant Stephen Harvey Piper, 9th Battalion, Nottinghamshire and Derbyshire Regiment
- Temp Major William Pollock, 465th Battery, 65th Brigade, Royal Field Artillery
- Captain and Brevet Major Sir Edward Hulton Preston Bt MC Royal Sussex Regiment
- Captain John Talbot Wentworth Reeve, Rifle Brigade, and Machine Gun Corps
- Temp Major Alan Reid-Kellett MC South Wales Borderers, attd. 6th Battalion
- Major John Galloway Riddick, Royal Engineers
- Captain James Robert Robertson, Bedfordshire Regiment
- Major Thomas Trevor Hull Robinson Royal Army Medical Corps, No. 5 Field Ambulance
- Major John Cowley Robson, Royal Field Artillery, attd. D. Battery, 52nd A. Brigade
- Temp Captain Vivian Barry Rogers MC General List
- Major Alistair Richard Roney-Dougal MC Royal Artillery
- Temp Major George Francis Rothschild MC 12th Battalion, Royal Sussex Regiment, attd. 2/10th Battalion, London Regiment
- Major Richard Herbert Rowe MC Royal Garrison Artillery
- Temp Major Reginald Herbert Rowland, 8th Battalion, Royal West Surrey Regiment
- Captain Humphrey Sayer MC Sussex Yeomanry
- Major Angus James Percy Scaife, Royal Garrison Artillery, 187th Siege Battery
- Captain Alexander Scott MC 1/7th Battalion, Argyll and Sutherland Highlanders
- Major Albert Harold Seagrim, Leinster Regiment, attd. 19th Battalion, Highland Light Infantry
- Major Raymond Morton Shaw MC Royal Field Artillery, attd. 246th (West Riding) Brigade
- Major George Edward Smart, Royal Garrison Artillery, 351st Siege Battery
- Major James Habersham Speeding, Royal Garrison Artillery, attd. 283rd Siege Battery
- Temp Captain Michael Spencer-Smith MC General List, attd. Canadian Corps Horse Artillery
- Major and Brevet Lieutenant-Colonel Wilfrid Bliss Spender MC Royal Garrison Artillery
- Major John Hector Stephen, 89th (Highland) 1/1st Field Ambulance, Royal Army Medical Corps
- Captain Alexander John Stephenson-Fetherstonhaugh MC Worcestershire Regiment
- Captain Charles Selby Stirling-Cookson MC King's Own Scottish Borderers
- Temp Major George Moore Stockings, 12th Battalion, Yorkshire Light Infantry
- Major Maiden Augustus Studd MC B/156th Brigade, Royal Field Artillery
- Captain and Brevet Major William Moxhay Sutton MC Somerset Light Infantry
- Captain and Brevet Major Oliver Sutton-Nelthorpe MC Rifle Brigade
- Temp Captain Robert Svensson MC Royal Army Medical Corps, 102nd Field Ambulance
- Cap Arthur Wignall Tate, Royal Highlanders, attd. 41st Battalion, Machine Gun Corps
- Captain and Brevet Major Alexander Patrick Drummond Telfer-Smollett MC Highland Light Infantry
- Lieutenant-Colonel Edward Gordon Thin, 10th Battalion, Liverpool Regiment
- Major Robert Henry Thomas, Royal Engineers
- Temp Major Stanley Ford Thomas, 6th Battalion, Shropshire Light Infantry
- Temp Captain Alan Chichester Thornson, Royal Engineers
- Temp Major George Thomson, 12th Battalion, Royal Irish Rifles
- Captain Hugh Charles Napier Trollope MC 2nd Battalion, Suffolk Regiment
- Major Arthur Owen Vaughan, Labour Corps
- Lieutenant Frederic Campbell Wallace MC Royal Irish Rifles
- Temp Lieutenant Neville Wakefield, Royal Field Artillery, attd. G. A.A. Battery
- Lieutenant Alsager Warburton MC 1/6th Battalion, Liverpool Regiment
- Major William Miles Moss O'Donnell Welsh MC C/106th Brigade, Royal Field Artillery
- Major Harold Graham Wilson, 1/5th Battalion, Lincolnshire Regiment
- Captain Francis William Wilson-Fitzgerald MC 1st Royal Dragoons
- Captain Wilfrid Ormonde Winter, No. 5 Railway Survey and Recon. Section, Royal Engineers
- Temp Captain Arthur Graham Woods MC 2nd Brigade, Tank Corps
- Major Philip Gerald Yorke, Royal Artillery
- Captain James Young 1/3rd (Lowland) Field Ambulance, Royal Army Medical Corps
- Major Jack Annand Cunningham DFC
- Captain Francis Joseph Edward Feeney
- Lieutenant-Colonel Francis Esmé Theodore Hewlett OBE
- Captain Arthur Frederick Foy Jacob
- Lieutenant-Colonel Arthur Murray Longmore
- Major Trafford Leigh Mallory
- Lieutenant-Colonel Hugh Mowbray Meyler MC
- Colonel Duncan le Geyt Pitcher CMG
- Major George Ronald MacFarlane Reid MC
- Lieutenant-Colonel Helperus Andrias Van Ryneveld MC

Canadian Force

- Major Florent Georges Arnold, Canadian Army Service Corps
- Major John Beswick Bailey, 54th Battalion, Canadian Infantry
- Major Roderick Ogle Bell-Irving MC 16th Battalion, Canadian Infantry
- Major Arthur Hardie Bick, Canadian Field Artillery
- Major Beverly W. Browne MC 16th Battalion, Canadian Infantry
- Major William James Gordon Burns, 32nd Battery, 8th Brigade, Canadian Field Artillery
- Colonel Royal Burritt, Manitoba Regiment
- Major David James Corrigall MC 1st Central Ontario Regiment
- Captain Selkirk George Currie MC Princess Patricia's Canadian Light Infantry
- Major John Carnegy de Balinhard, Saskatchewan Regiment
- Major Wallace Hugh Dobbie, 1st Siege Battery, Canadian G. Artillery
- Brigadier-General William Okell Holden Dodds CMG Canadian Field Artillery
- Major Alexander Stuart Donald, 20th Battery, 5th Brigade, Canadian Field Artillery
- Major Andrew Eastman Duncanson, 123rd Battalion, Canadian Infantry
- Major Philip Earnshaw MC 1st Canadian Divisional Signals Company, Canadian Engineers
- Major Ernest Flexman, D/22nd Battery, 6th Brigade, Canadian Field Artillery
- Major John Fortescue Foulkes, Canadian General List
- Major Daniel William Fraser, 6th Battalion, Canadian Railway Troops
- Lieutenant-Colonel Albert Coleman Garner, 12th Battalion, Canadian Railway Troops
- Major Elliot Anson Greene, 61st Battery, 14th Brigade, Canadian Field Artillery
- Major Robert Dickson Harkness MC 1st Motor Machine Gun Brigade, Machine Gun Corps
- Major Patrick Hennessy MC Canadian Army Service Corps
- Major Arthur Hibbert MC 3rd Canadian Tunneling Company, Canadian Engineers
- Lieutenant-Colonel John Houliston, Canadian Engineers
- Major Norman Holliday Macaulay, Canadian Field Artillery
- Lieutenant-Colonel Walter Adam McConnell, 10th Battalion, Canadian Railway Troops
- Major Cuthbert Finnie McEwan, Canadian Light Horse
- Lieutenant-Colonel Walter Norwood Moorhouse, 3rd Battalion, Canadian Machine Gun Corps
- Major John Alexander McIntosh, 18th Battalion, Canadian Infantry
- Major James Ivan McSloy, 4th Brigade, Canadian Field Artillery
- Temp Lieutenant-Colonel Allan Angus Magee, Quebec Regiment
- Major Harry Frederick Victor Mearling MC 2nd Motor Machine Gun Brigade, Canadian Machine Gun Corps
- Major Ernest Russell Morris, 1st Battalion, Canadian Machine Gun Corps
- Lieutenant-Colonel William Aird Munro, 11th Battalion, Canadian Railway Troops
- Quartermaster and Major Edward Albert Oliver, 38th Battalion, Canadian Infantry
- Major Leonard Cecil Outerbridge, 75th Battalion, Canadian Infantry
- Major Frederick Ross Phelan MC 87th Battalion, Canadian Infantry
- Major Francis Arthur Robertson, 12th Siege Battery, Canadian Garrison Artillery
- Major Robert Porteous Saunders MC 19th Battalion, Canadian Infantry
- Major Kenneth Stuart MC 7th Battalion, Canadian Engineers
- Temp Major William George Swan, 2nd Battalion, Canadian Railway Troops
- Major Edward Vivian Thompson, 33rd Battery, 9th Brigade, Canadian Field Artillery
- Temp Lieutenant-Colonel Charles Walter Vipond, 9th Field Ambulance, Canadian Army Medical Corps
- Major William Basil Wedd MC 1st Central Ontario Regiment
- Major Henry Willis O'Connor, East Ontario Regiment
- Major James Henry Wood, 2nd Field Ambulance, Canadian Army Medical Corps
- Lieutenant-Colonel James Gordon Weir MC 2nd Battalion, Canadian Machine Gun Corps

Australian Imperial Force

- Lieutenant-Colonel Walter William Alderman CMG Australian Imperial Force, attd. 1st Battalion, Auckland Regiment, New Zealand Forces
- Major James Sinclair Standish Anderson MC 58th Battalion, secd. 3rd Australian Infantry Brigade Headquarters
- Major Frank Horton Berryman, 5th A. Brigade, Australian Field Artillery
- Major Harry Charles Bundock, 36th Australian Heavy Artillery Brigade
- Major Henry Gervais Lovett Cameron MC 56th Battalion, Australian Imperial Force
- Major Eric Campbell, 12th A. Brigade, Australian Field Artillery
- Major Reginald Blakeney Carr, 13th Field Company, Australian Engineers
- Lieutenant-Colonel Roy William Chambers, 11th Field Ambulance, Australian Army Medical Corps
- Major Cyril Albert Clowes MC Australian Field Artillery
- Major Hugh John Connell MC 35th Battalion, Australian Imperial Force
- Lieutenant-Colonel William Edward Lodewyk Hamilton Crowther, 5th Field Ambulance, Australian Army Medical Corps
- Major Edward John Dibdin, 42nd Battalion, Australian Imperial Force
- Lieutenant-Colonel John Farrell, 43rd Battalion, Australian Imperial Force
- Major Arthur William Hutchin, General List
- Major John Morphett Irwin, 7th Brigade, Australian Field Artillery
- Major Joseph Edward Lee MC 45th Battalion, Australian Imperial Force
- Major Edmund Frank Lind, 2nd Field Ambulance, Australian Army Medical Corps
- Major Eyrl George Lister, 13th Brigade, Australian Field Artillery
- Major Robert Arthur Little, 1st Brigade, Australian Field Artillery
- Lieutenant-Colonel George-William Macartney, 10th Field Ambulance, Australian Army Medical Corps
- Major John James Lawton McCall, 20th Battalion, Australian Imperial Force
- Major Walter Paton MacCallum MC 20th Battalion, Australian Imperial Force
- Major Archibald McKillop, 1st Field Ambulance, Australian Army Medical Corps
- Major Sydney Albert Middleton, 19th Battalion, Australian Imperial Force
- Major Edward James Milford, 4th Brigade, Australian Field Artillery
- Major Claude Morlet, 13th Field Ambulance, Australian Army Medical Corps
- Major William Alexander Morton, Australian Army Medical Corps, attd. 3rd Brigade, Australian Field Artillery
- Lieutenant-Colonel Thomas Murdoch, 1st Pioneer Battalion, Australian Imperial Force
- Major Harold Hillis Page MC 25th Battalion, Australian Imperial Force
- Major John Henry Francis Pain MC 2nd Battalion, Australian Imperial Force
- Major Hubert Stanley Wyborn Parker, 6th A. Brigade, Australian Field Artillery
- Major Robert Stewart Reid, 5th Field Company, Australian Engineers
- Major Burford Sampson, 15th Battalion, Australian Imperial Force
- Lieutenant-Colonel William Henry Sanday MC 3rd Pioneer Battalion, Australian Imperial Force
- Major Alexander Sanderson MC 3rd Tunneling Company, Australian Engineers
- Major Vincent Wellesley Savage, 3rd Field Ambulance, Australian Army Medical Corps
- Major William Campibell Sawers, 14th Field Ambulance, Australian Army Medical Corps
- Major Thomas Browne Slaney, 8th Brigade, Australian Field Artillery
- Lieutenant-Colonel George Ingram Stevenson CMG Australian Field Artillery
- Major Frederick Street, 30th Battalion, Australian Imperial Force
- Major Francis Thornthwaite MC 5th Divisional Artillery Column, Australian Field Artillery
- Major Raymond Walter Tovell, 4th Pioneer Battalion, Australian Imperial Force
- Lieutenant-Colonel Charles Vincent Watson, 58th Battalion, Australian Imperial Force
- Major Stanley Holm Watson MC 2nd A. Divisional Signal Company, Australian Engineers
- Captain Frank Alan Wisdom MC 30th Battalion, Australian Imperial Force

New Zealand Force

- Lieutenant-Colonel George Craig, No. 1 New Zealand Field Ambulance, New Zealand Medical Corps
- Captain Alexander Smith Falconer MC Otago Regiment
- Major William Ivan Kirke Jennings, Machine Gun Corps
- Major Robert Gracie Milhgan, 15th Battery, 1st Brigade, New Zealand Field Artillery
- Lieutenant-Colonel Norman Francis Shepherd, New Zealand Rifle Brigade
- Major Clive Sommeryille, 12th Battery, 3rd Brigade, New Zealand Field Artillery
- Major Neiwman Robert Wilson MC 2nd Battalion, Canterbury Regiment
- Major Robert Adams Wilson, 6th Battalion, 2nd A. Brigade, New Zealand Field Artillery, attd. from Royal Garrison Artillery

South African Force

- Temp Captain Philip Albert Myburgh Hands MC South African Horse Artillery attd. 162nd Siege Battery, Royal Garrison Artillery
- Major Herbert Harold Jenkins, 1st South African Infantry
- Temp Major Lionel Herbert Maasdorp, 75th Siege Battery, South African Horse Artillery

For distinguished service in connection with Military Operations in Egypt:

- Temp Captain John Howard Alexander MC Royal Engineers
- Major Ernest Edward Austen, 28th (C. of L.) Battalion, London Regiment, attd. Royal Army Medical Corps
- Major Leonard Avery Avery, Royal Army Medical Corps, attd. 1/1st Buckinghamshire Yeomanry
- Major Harold Gordon Bagnall, Royal Garrison Artillery
- Major Stanley Welch Beeman, Liverpool Regiment, attd. 2/5th Battalion, Hampshire Regiment
- Temp Major William James Bensly, 1st Battalion, British West Indies Regiment
- Major Leigh Harley Delves Broughton, Royal Field Artillery
- Lieutenant-Colonel Gilbert Robert Cassels, 1st Battalion, 123rd Outrams Rifles, Indian Army
- Captain Thomas George Frederick Cochrane, Royal Highlanders, attd. 2nd Battalion
- Captain Walter Merry Craddock MC 2/20th (C. of L.) Battalion, London Regiment, attd. 2/19th Battalion
- Major John Evelyn Davy, Royal Field Artillery
- Lieutenant John William Downes MC Shropshire Yeomanry, attd. 1/4th Battalion, Welsh Regiment
- Major Walter Leslie Dundas, 4th Battalion, 11th Gurkha Rifles, Indian Army (late 2/3rd Gurkha Rifles)
- Lieutenant-Colonel Charles Sidney Eastmead, 2nd Battalion 3rd Gurkha Rifles, Indian Army
- Captain Newlyn Mason Elliott, Royal Horse Artillery, attd. B. Battery, Honourable Artillery Company
- Major John Evans Royal Army Medical Corps
- Captain Evelyn Robert Leopold Fraser-MacKenzie MC Royal Horse Artillery, attd. Nottinghamshire Battery
- Captain Bernard Russell French, Royal Munster Fusiliers, attd. 5th Battalion, Royal Irish Fusiliers
- Major Richard Gardiner. 53rd Sikhs, Indian Army
- Major Gerard Maxwell Glynton, 3rd Gurkha Rifles, Indian Army
- Major Herbert Stuart, Lord Hampton, 1/1st Worcestershire Yeomanry (late Rifle Brigade)
- Major and Brevet Lieutenant-Colonel Hyla Napier Holden, 5th Cavalry, Indian Army
- Captain James Arthur Jervois MC Yorkshire Light Infantry, attd. 2/22nd Battalion, London Regiment
- Major Bertram Graham Balfour Kidd, 1/125th Napiers Rifles, Indian Army, attd. 1st Battalion, 123rd Outrams Rifles
- Captain Harold Gordon Canny Laird, 1st Battalion, 101st Grenadiers, Indian Army
- Captain Patrick McEnroy MC 1st Battalion, Leinster Regiment
- Major Percy Guy Wolfe Maynard, Royal Irish Rifles, attd. Egyptian Army
- Lieutenant-Colonel and Brevet Colonel Shadwell John Murray, Connaught Rangers
- Major Estricke Sidney Phillips, 195th Heavy Battery, Royal Garrison Artillery
- Major Thomas Ellis Robins, City of London Yeomanry
- Major Harold Middleton Drury Shaw, 1st Battalion, Gurkha Rifles, attd. 3rd Battalion, 3rd Gurkha Rifles, Indian Army
- Major Douglas Brooke Charles Sladen, Royal Garrison Artillery, attd. 378th Siege Battery
- Lieutenant-Colonel George Edward Stanley Smith, 1/4th Battalion, Duke of Cornwall's Light Infantry
- Major Ian Mackintosh Smith MC Somerset Light Infantry
- Major Francis Edmond Crawshay Stanley, Royal Field Artillery
- Lieutenant Anthony John Vernon MC 2nd Battalion, Royal Irish Fusiliers
- Major Thomas Henry Walker, Royal Field Artillery
- Major Harry Weisberg, City of London Yeomanry, attd. Machine Gun Corps
- Captain John Hay Young MC Argyll and Sutherland Highlanders, attd. 2/16th Battalion, London Regiment

Australian Imperial Force

- Major Warren Melville Anderson, 6th Australian Light Horse Regiment
- Major Michael Frederick Bruxner, 6th Australian Light Horse Regiment
- Major Percy Dunningham, Australian Army Service Corps
- Major Harold Arthur Maunder, Australian Army Service Corps
- Major Stuart Archibald Tooth, 6th Australian Light Horse Regiment
- Colonel Lachlan Chisholm Wilson CMG 5th Australian Light Horse Regiment

For services rendered in connection with Military Operations in Italy:

- Temp Captain Robert Lloyd Abell MC 104Ch Battery, 22nd Brigade, Royal Field Artillery
- Major Kenneth Morland Agnew MC Royal Field Artillery
- Major Ernald Barnardiston, Royal Engineers
- Captain John Percival Bate MC 1/8th Battalion, Worcestershire Regiment
- Temp Major Howard Arthur Bowser, 171st Siege Battery, Royal Garrison Artillery
- Captain Ralph Alexander Broderick MC 1/2nd Battalion, South Midland Brigade, Field Ambulance, Royal Army Medical Corps
- Captain Hugh Vivian Combs MC Buckinghamshire Battalion, Oxfordshire & Buckinghamshire Light Infantry, attd. 23rd Machine Gun Battalion
- Temp Captain Leonard Montague Greenwood MC 13th (S.) Battalion, Durham Light Infantry
- Captain Philip Ashley Hall MC Buckinghamshire Battalion, Oxfordshire & Buckinghamshire Light Infantry
- Lieutenant-Colonel Walter Henry Bell Jacob, Royal Garrison Artillery, Headquarters, 104th Brigade, Royal Garrison Artillery
- Captain Maurice Luby MC 128th Field Company, Royal Engineers
- Temp Captain William Mackenzie Royal Army Medical Corps, attd. 9th Battalion, South Staffordshire Regiment
- Captain Roderick Macleod MC Royal Field Artillery, attd. 241st Brigade, Royal Field Artillery
- Temp Captain Donald Murray, Manchester Regiment, attd. 21st Battalion
- Temp Major William McCormick Sharpe, 197th Siege Battery, Royal Garrison Artillery
- Temp Major James Thomas Walker MC 317th Siege Battery, Royal Garrison Artillery
- Major Reginald Henry Montagu Watson, Royal Garrison Artillery, Headquarters, 15th Brigade, Royal Garrison Artillery

For valuable services rendered in connection with Military Operations in Salonika:

- Temp Major Walter Storey Cowland, 12th Battalion, Hampshire Regiment
- Temp Major Ivor Richard Cox, Royal Garrison Artillery
- Major Knightley Fletcher Dunsterville, Royal Garrison Artillery
- Major James Hector Edmond, Royal Garrison Artillery
- Major Eric Victor Howard Fairtlough MC Royal Artillery
- Major Sydney Lancelot Harvey MC Royal Engineers
- Captain William Corson Holden MC Royal Garrison Artillery
- Temp Major David Niel Hossie, Royal Field Artillery
- Major and Brevet Lieutenant-Colonel The Honourable Hugh Edward Joicey, 14th Hussars
- Captain George Stanley McNaught, Cheshire Regiment
- Captain and Brevet Major James Frederick Baker Morrell MVO East Lancashire Regiment
- Major and Brevet Lieutenant-Colonel William Neilson, 4th Hussars
- Lieutenant-Colonel Henry John Bartlet Span, 1st Battalion, Welsh Regiment
- Captain and Brevet Major Claude Waterhouse Hearn Taylor, 3rd Battalion, Royal West Kent Regiment
- Captain Leslie Hamilton Trist MC Lincolnshire Regiment (S.E.)
- Major Charles Henry Wallace, Royal Field Artillery
- Major and Brevet Lieutenant-Colonel Arthur Hamilton Yatman, Somerset Light Infantry
- Lieutenant Sidney Blyth MC Royal Scots (S.E.), attd. 1st Battalion
- Temp Lieutenant Humbert Victor Whittall MC Special List
- Temp Lieutenant Charles Edward Witcomb MC 2nd Battalion, Gloucestershire Regiment

For distinguished service in connection with Military Operations in North Russia

- Major and Brevet Lieutenant-Colonel Frank Graham Marsh CMG Indian Army

In recognition of valuable services rendered with the Forces in Northern Russia:

- Corporal W. B. Wilde, Royal Engineers (Southampton)
- Private M. Fredjohn, Labour Corps, 9th Labour Battalion (Clapham)
- Staff Sergeant Major W. R. Doe, Royal Army Service Corps (Slough)
- Staff Sergeant Major C. Garside MC Royal Army Service Corps (Salisbury)
- Private F. Brown, Royal Army Service Corps (Leigh)
- Conductor D. Leroy, Royal Army Ordnance Corps (Gravesend)
- Private J. R. Chapman, Royal Army Ordnance Corps (Hassocks)

=== Awarded a Bar to the Distinguished Service Order (DSO*) ===
- Captain William Philip Jopp Akerman DSO MC Royal Field Artillery, attd. A. Battery, 295th (North Midland) Brigade, Royal Field Artillery
- Major Vivian Allan Batchelor DSO Royal Field Artillery
- Temp Major William Allan Bowen DSO 10th Battalion, Worcestershire Regiment, Comdg. 1/4th Battalion, Shropshire Light Infantry
- Lieutenant Wilkins Fitzwilliam Chipp DSO MC 1/1st Battalion, Herefordshire Regiment
- Captain Henry Wolryche Dakeyne DSO Royal Warwickshire Regiment, attd. 8th Battalion, North Staffordshire Regiment
- Captain John Ralph Congreve Dent DSO MC 1st Battalion, Royal Inniskilling Fusiliers
- Lieutenant Alfred Hacking DSO MC 1/8th Battalion, attd. 1/5th Battalion, Nottinghamshire and Derbyshire Regiment
- Captain Romney Robert Godred Kane DSO 1st Battalion, Royal Munster Fusiliers
- Captain Cecil Lister DSO MC Northamptonshire Regiment, attd. 6th Battalion, South Staffordshire Regiment
- Lieutenant Wilfrid Cabourn Smith DSO MC 6th Battalion, King's Royal Rifle Corps, attd. 17th Battalion, Royal Fusiliers
- Captain and Brevet Major Denis Mavisyn Anslow Sole DSO Border Regiment, attd. 10th Battalion, Worcestershire Regiment

Canadian Force

- Major Charles Edward Connolly DSO Lord Strathcona's Horse, Canadian Cavalry
- Brigadier-General George Stuart Tuxford CB CMG DSO Saskatchewan Regiment, Comdg. Canadian Infantry Brigade

For distinguished service in connection with Military Operations in Egypt:

- Major Howard Lowndes Moir DSO 1/7th Battalion, Cheshire Regiment

For services rendered in connection with Military Operations in Italy:

- Major Herbert Dudley Carlton DSO Royal Scots, attd. 2nd Battalion, Royal West Surrey Regiment
- Captain Cyril Ernest Napier Lomax DSO MC Welsh Regiment, attd. 21st Battalion, Manchester Regiment
- Lieutenant-Colonel and Brevet Colonel Julian McCarty Steele CB CMG DSO Coldstream Guards

For valuable services rendered in connection with Military Operations in Salonika:

- Major Edward Hills Nicholson DSO

== Military Cross (MC) ==
- Temp Lieutenant Alexander Walter Abbey DCM 250th T. Company, Royal Engineers
- Captain Herbert Walter Acland-Troyte, 2/1st Devonshire Yeomanry
- Temp Lieutenant Williaim Lawrence Adamson, 38th Battalion, Machine Gun Corps
- Lieutenant Edward Walter Tracy Agar, let Battalion, King's Own Scottish Borderers
- Lieutenant Hugh Aglionby, Royal Garrison Artillery, attd. 219th S. Battery
- Temp Captain Richard John Aherne, Royal Army Medical Corps, attd. 9th Battalion, North Staffordshire Regiment
- Lieutenant Thomas Ainsworth, 1/9th Battalion, Manchester Regiment, attd. 126th Light Trench Mortar Battery
- Temp Lieutenant George James Aldous, Royal Army Service Corps, attd. 18th Division M.T. Company
- Lieutenant David Alexander, Royal Garrison Artillery, attd. 524th S. Battery
- Lieutenant Francis Alker, 5th Battalion, North Lancashire Regiment, attd. Intelligence Corps
- Lieutenant Edward Blake Allan, Royal Garrison Artillery, attd. XIX Corps Heavy Artillery
- Lieutenant John Harcourt Allen, Royal Garrison Artillery, attd. 144th S. Battery
- Lieutenant William Noble Robb Alston, 1/4th Battalion, King's Own Scottish Borderers
- Lieutenant George Ames, B/293rd London Brigade, Royal Field Artillery
- Lieutenant Robert Alexander Andrew, Fife and Forfar Yeomanry, attd. 14th Battalion, Royal Highlanders
- Rev. James Andrews, Royal Army Chaplains' Department, attd. D/78th Brigade, Royal Field Artillery
- Temp Captain William Henry Ansell, 289th A.T. Company, Royal Engineers
- Lieutenant John Norman Arnaud, Royal West Kent Regiment, attd. 8th Battalion
- Lieutenant Mervyn Nevil Arnold-Forster, Grenadier Guards, attd. 4th Battalion, Guards Machine Gun Regiment
- Rev. William Lynn Arrowsmith, Royal Army Chaplains' Department, attd. 2/4th Battalion, Royal Berkshire Regiment
- Lieutenant George Hugo Daniel Ascoli, 2nd Dragoon Guards Spec. Reserve, attd. 1st Signal Squadron, Royal Engineers
- Captain Percy Arthur Blundell Ashmead-Bartlett, 11th Battalion, London Regiment
- Lieutenant Frank Ashton, Royal Field Artillery, attd. B/64th Brigade, Royal Field Artillery
- Lieutenant Edward Kingston Stuart Aslat, Royal Garrison Artillery, attd. 249th S. Battery
- Captain Gervase Babington, North Somerset Yeomanry, attd. Headquarters, 6th Cavalry Brigade
- Quartermaster and Lieutenant Frederick Ferdinand Bailey DCM attd. 1/17th Battalion, London Regiment
- Temp Captain Hugh Cossart Baker, Royal Artillery, attd. 91st Brigade, Royal Field Artillery
- Lieutenant Thomas Ballantyne, 5th Battalion, King's Own Scottish Borderers, attd. Signal Service, Royal Engineers
- Temp Lieutenant Edward Nathaniel Bancroft, 157th Field Company, Royal Engineers
- Captain Basil Hastings Barber, King Edward's Horse, attd. Brit. Miss., Fr. General Headquarters
- Temp Lieutenant Cecil Herbert Barclay, 3rd Signal Company, Royal Engineers
- Captain James Barclay-Maine, Royal Field Artillery, attd. B/190th Brigade, Royal Field Artillery
- Quartermaster and Captain Herbert Barker, 5th Battalion, Yorkshire Light Infantry
- Temp 2nd Lieutenant Thomas Percy Barnes, 137th Company, L.C.
- Temp2rtd Lieutenant David Ross Barr, 7th Battalion, Border Regiment
- Quartermaster and Captain Thomas Barradell, 1st North Midland Field Ambulance, attd. 1/1st (Northumberland) Field Ambulance, Royal Army Medical Corps
- Lieutenant Edmund Arthur Bartleet, Royal Garrison Artillery, attd. 263rd Siege Battery
- Lieutenant Charles Harold Bateman, Royal Garrison Artillery, attd. 20th Siege Battery
- Temp Captain George William Baxter, B/152nd Brigade, Royal Field Artillery
- Temp Captain Frederick Scarth Beadon, 18th Battalion, Durham Light Infantry
- Lieutenant Verey Alfred Beckley, Royal Garrison Artillery, attd. 187th Siege Battery
- Captain William John Beddows, Royal Field Artillery
- Temp Lieutenant Frederick John Beecham, 37th Battalion, Machine Gun Corps
- Lieutenant Robert Buxton Beilby, 1/1st Yorkshire Dragoons, attd. Royal Engineers
- Temp Lieutenant Alan Edmund Beeton, Camouflage Pk., Royal Engineers, attd. XnI Corps
- Lieutenant Wilfred Bernard Belcher, Royal Berkshire Regiment
- Captain Frederick Archibald Bell, Royal Engineers, attd. 4th Division Engineers
- Lieutenant Henry George Bell, Royal Garrison Artillery, attd. 190th Siege Battery, Royal Garrison Artillery
- Captain James Alan Bell, 7th Battalion, Durham Light Infantry
- Lieutenant John Norman Bell, 6th Battalion, Welsh Regiment
- Temp Lieutenant Eric Wilfrid John Bence, Headquarters, 87th Brigade, Royal Field Artillery
- Lieutenant Percy Salisbury Bent, Royal Garrison Artillery, attd. 91st Brigade, Royal Garrison Artillery
- Lieutenant Albert William Bentley, Royal Field Artillery, attd. Headquarters, 48th Brigade, Royal Field Artillery
- Temp Lieutenant Walter Marcus Beresford, No. 2 Ry. Tel. Company, Royal Engineers
- Lieutenant Roy Cressy Frederick Besch, 28th Battalion, London Regiment
- Lieutenant Earle Best, 458th (West Riding) Field Company, Royal Engineers
- Temp Lieutenant Edward Billington, 15th Battalion, Cheshire Regiment
- Lieutenant Vernon Shirley Birt, Royal Garrison Artillery, attd. 101st Siege Battery
- Captain Cuthbert Bernard Joseph Bishop, D/47th Brigade, Royal Field Artillery
- Lieutenant Frederick Bishop, 1/5th Battalion, Cheshire Regiment, attd. 169th Infantry Brigade
- Temp Captain William Collins Gordon Black, General List, attd. Headquarters, 103rd Infantry Brigade
- Temp Lieutenant Arthur Basil Blagden, Lincolnshire Regiment, attd. 44th Trench Mortar Battery
- Temp Lieutenant Cedric Blaker, 2nd Battalion, Royal Sussex Regiment
- Temp 2nd Lieutenant Edwin James Blakemore, 2nd Battalion Royal Warwickshire Regiment, attd. 2/6th Battalion, North Staffordshire Regiment
- Captain William Roy Blore Royal Army Medical Corps, attd. 35th Field Ambulance
- Captain Claude Leslie Bolton, 366th Battery, 117th Brigade, Royal Field Artillery
- Lieutenant Robert Cecil-Bonsor, Welsh Guards, attd. 1st Battalion
- Captain Colin Henry Alfred Borradaile, Royal Garrison Artillery, attd1/1st Kent Heavy Battery, Royal Garrison Artillery
- Lieutenant Peter Swinton Boult, Royal Garrison Artillery, attd. R A.A. Battery
- Lieutenant Wilfrid Augustin Ranulph Bourne, 513th Field Company, Royal Engineers
- Lieutenant Ernest Bertie Bowell, Suffolk Regiment, attd. 11th Battalion
- Temp Lieutenant John Bowen, 254th Tunneling Company, Royal Engineers
- Lieutenant Wilfred Bowerbank, Northumberland Fusiliers, attd. 36th Battalion, Machine Gun Corps
- Temp Lieutenant Adam, Hogg Bowie, 184th Tunneling Company, Royal Engineers
- Temp Captain Richard Boxall, 1st Brigade, Tank Corps
- 2nd Lieutenant Edgar Brinton MM D/174th Brigade, Royal Field Artillery
- Lieutenant Bertram Brockleliurst, Royal Field Artillery, attd. 70th Brigade
- Lieutenant Benjamin Collins Brodie, Surrey Yeomanry attd. 1/4th Battalion, Gordon Highlanders
- Temp 2nd Lieutenant Frank Larden Bromfield, 1st Battalion, Royal Lancaster Regiment
- Lieutenant George Leslie Bronsdon, 469th (North Midland) Field Company, Royal Engineers
- Lieutenant Deny Anthony Brown, 1st Battalion, Royal West Surrey Regiment, attd. A. Signal Service
- Quartermaster and Captain James Brown, 5/6th Battalion, Scottish Rifles
- Captain Ernest Frederick Browning, West Somerset Yeomanry, attd. 122nd Company, L.C
- Temp Captain Angus Buchanan 49th Field Ambulance, Royal Army Medical Corps
- Temp Lieutenant William Dover Way Buckell, 21st Battalion, Machine Gun Corps
- 2nd Lieutenant George William Bullock, Royal Garrison Artillery, attd. 230th Siege Battery
- Temp 2nd Lieutenant James Bullpitt, 1st Battalion, Machine Gun Corps
- Captain William Burges, 66th S. Battery, Royal Garrison Artillery
- Temp Lieutenant William French Burman, 2nd Battalion, Suffolk Regiment
- Lieutenant Mark Hilvesley Jonas Burns-Lindow, Westmorland and Cumberland Yeomanry, attd. HQ XI. Corps
- Lieutenant Gerald Keath Burston, Royal Field Artillery, attd. Headquarters, 76th Brigade, Royal Field Artillery
- Lieutenant Philip Augustine Burton, Royal Field Artillery, attd. Brit. Miss. Portuguese Corps
- Temp 2nd Lieutenant Herbert Gladstone William Busbridge, No. 9 M.T. Company, Royal Army Service Corps
- Lieutenant Harry Butcher, Royal Garrison Artillery, attd. 366th S. Battery
- Captain Charles Caddick-Adams, 5th Battalion, North Staffordshire Regiment, attd. 12th Battalion, Machine Gun Corps
- Lieutenant Stanley Ewart Cairns, 1/7th, attd. 1/8th Battalion, Nottinghamshire and Derbyshire Regiment
- Temp Lieutenant William Leonard Caldwell, 17th Bra Lancashire Fusiliers, attd. 104th Light Trench Mortar Battery
- Lieutenant William Bedford St. George Cameron, Royal Dublin Fusiliers, attd. 1st Battalion
- Temp Captain Colin Walter Campbell, Royal Garrison Artillery, attd. N. A.A Battery
- Rev. John McLeod Campbell, Royal Army Chaplains' Department, attd. 4th Division
- Lieutenant Patrick Seymour Campbell Campbell-Johnston, Royal Artillery
- Temp Quartermaster and Lieutenant Michael Joseph Carey, 12th Battalion, Rifle Brigade
- Sergeant Major John Alfred Carleton, 2nd Battalion, Royal Scots
- Lieutenant Thomas Carlyle, 19th Battalion, London Regiment, attd. 1st Battalion, Rifle Brigade
- Company Sergeant Major Thomas Patrick Carney DCM 1st Battalion, East Yorkshire Regiment
- Temp Captain David Leonard Carr, Royal Garrison Artillery, attd. Vn. Corps, Royal Artillery
- Captain William Blacker Cathcart, Royal Army Medical Corps, attd. 72nd Field Ambulance
- Lieutenant Richard Chaffer, 1/4th Battalion, South Lancashire Regiment
- Temp Lieutenant Robert Mair Chalmers, 172nd Tunneling Company, Royal Engineers
- Rev. Lawrence Godfrey Chamberlen, Royal Army Chaplains' Department
- Captain Guy Oldham Chambers, Royal Army Medical Corps, attd. HQ Cavalry Corps
- Lieutenant Andrew Lawrance Chapman, 5th Battalion, King's Own Scottish Borderers, attd. 6th Battalion
- Temp Lieutenant Albert Rowland Chapman, 6th Battalion, Tank Corps
- Temp 2nd Lieutenant Cyril Walter Charter, 1st Battalion, Tank Corps
- Lieutenant Archibald George Church, Royal Garrison Artillery, attd. 238th S. Battery
- Temp Captain Ernest Frank Churchill, 1st Tank Brigade, Signal Company, Royal Engineers
- Temp Lieutenant Thomas Bailey Clapham, Royal Army Service Corps, attd. 66th Brigade, Royal Garrison Artillery
- Temp Captain John Cosmo Clark, 13th Battalion, Middlesex Regiment
- Temp Quartermaster and Lieutenant George Clarke, General List, attd. 43rd Labour Group HQ
- Lieutenant Francis Charles Clayton, 6th Battalion, Northumberland Fusiliers, attd. 149th Infantry Brigade HQ
- Captain Percy Lawrence Cockerill, 16th Battalion, London Regiment
- Temp Captain Exio Sutherland Cockshut, 12th Battalion, Tank Corps
- Temp Lieutenant Derek John Richard Coles, XI. Corps. Troops MT. Company, Royal Army Service Corps
- Temp Captain John Colet Collett, Royal Engineers
- Lieutenant Mark Harold Collet, No. 11 How. Battery, Royal Marine Artillery
- Temp 2nd Lieutenant William Collier, 175th Company, L.C
- Captain George Augustus Stevenson Collin, 4th R. Lancaster Brigade, Royal Field Artillery, attd. 15th Battery Royal Field Artillery
- Temp Captain Albert William Coffingbourne, 9th Battalion, Royal Sussex Regiment
- Lieutenant Frederick Charles Collins, 17th Divisional Artillery Column, Royal Field Artillery
- Lieutenant Robert MacNaughton Connell, Royal Garrison Artillery, attd. 140th Heavy Battery
- Lieutenant William Caldwell Connell, E. Kent Yeomanry, attd. 6th Battalion, East Kent Regiment
- Temp Lieutenant Charles Henry Cook, 7th Battalion, Norfolk Regiment
- 2nd Lieutenant Ernest Norville Cooke, Royal Field Artillery, attd. B/330th (East Lancaster) Brigade, Royal Field Artillery
- Lieutenant John Corke, 237th Siege Battery, Royal Garrison Artillery
- Lieutenant Eric Denis Corkery, 1st Battalion, Devonshire Regiment
- Lieutenant William Henry Elmo Cornish, Royal Field Artillery, attd. N. A.A. Battery
- Lieutenant Alfred Douglas Gordon Courage, Royal Artillery, attd. Headquarters, 1st Army A.A. Def
- Temp 2nd Lieutenant Andrew Gardiner Coventry, 8th Battalion, Northumberland Fusiliers
- Captain Francis Bolam Cowen, 7th Battalion, Northumberland Fusiliers, attd. 6th Battalion, Machine Gun Corps
- 2nd Lieutenant George William Cox
- Rev. Hubert Cecil Cox, Royal Army Chaplains' Department, attd. 16th Divisional Artillery Column
- Lieutenant Frederick Cozens, Royal West Kent Regiment, attd. 4th Battalion, Tank Corps
- Lieutenant Thomas Dick Craig, 1/5th Battalion, King's Own Scottish Borderers
- Temp Quartermaster and Captain Archie William Craven, 3rd Battalion, Machine Gun Corps
- Lieutenant Sidney Egerton Crooke, D/286th (West Lancaster) Brigade, Royal Field Artillery
- Temp Captain Leslie John Croxford, 10th Battalion, Tank Corps
- Captain Frederick Salter Cubitt, 4th Battalion, Suffolk Regiment
- Lieutenant John McAdam Cunningham, 1st Battalion, Gordon Highlanders, attd. 12th Infantry Brigade HQ
- Captain Cedric Isham Curteis, 108th Brigade, Royal Field Artillery
- 2nd Lieutenant Herbert Cusworth, Royal Garrison Artillery, attd. 499th Battery, Royal Garrison Artillery
- Temp 2nd Lieutenant Frederick James Searle Dalton, 25th Battalion, Machine Gun Corps
- 2nd Lieutenant Francis Henry James Damp, 4th Battalion, Hampshire Regiment, attd. 15th
- Captain Henry Edmund Blackburne Daniell, 9th Battalion, Durham Light Infantry, attd. 171st Company, Royal Engineers
- Temp Lieutenant Howard Dargie, 12/13th Battalion, Northumberland Fusiliers, attd. 62nd Infantry Brigade
- Temp Lieutenant David Davidson, 15th Field Company, Royal Engineers
- Temp Lieutenant Walker Wheatley Davidson, 353rd Elec. and Mechanic Company, Royal Engineers
- Lieutenant Harold Charles Edward Davis, 1st Battalion, Monmouthshire Regiment, attd. 15th Battalion, Cheshire Regiment
- Lieutenant Rudolph Victor Dawes, 151st Siege Battery, Royal Garrison Artillery
- Quartermaster and Lieutenant Horace Alfred Day, Royal Marines, Hawke Battalion, Royal Naval Division
- Captain Alan Murray Gordon Debenham, 1/7th Battalion, Lancashire Fusiliers
- Temp Lieutenant Walter Edgar Demuth, 9th Battalion, Tank Corps
- Temp Captain Charles Percival Denby, Royal Field Artillery, attd. 155th Brigade, Ammn. Column Royal Field Artillery
- Temp Lieutenant Norman Heathfield Dendy, 42nd Brigade, Royal Field Artillery
- 2nd Lieutenant John Denyer, Royal Garrison Artillery, attd. 133rd Siege Battery
- Captain Edward Hubert Michael de Stacpoole, Leinster Regiment
- Temp Lieutenant Edward Newton Dickenson, 13th Battalion, King's Royal Rifle Corps
- Temp Lieutenant Henry Alderman Dickman, 167th A.T. Company, Royal Engineers
- Temp Lieutenant Edward Alfred Tandy Dillon, 250th Field Company, Royal Engineers
- Rev. John Francis Dolan, Royal Army Chaplains' Department, attd. 15th Battalion, Cheshire Regiment
- Quartermaster and Captain John Donald, 3rd Dragoon Guards
- Lieutenant Alan July an Donkin, 409th Siege Battery, Royal Garrison Artillery
- Captain Oscar Clayton Downes DSO Rifle Brigade
- Temp Lieutenant Sydney Houghton Dowson, 1st Battalion, Royal Warwickshire Regiment
- Temp Captain Charles Francis Drew No. 9 Field Ambulance, Royal Army Medical Corps
- Temp Lieutenant Alexander MacGregor Duff, attd. 84th Battery, 84th Brigade, Royal Field Artillery
- Captain James Catto Duffus, 255th Brigade, Royal Field Artillery
- Captain Leslie Bland Dufton, 2/1st Lancaster Brigade, Royal Garrison Artillery, attd. 109th Heavy Battery, Royal Garrison Artillery
- Lieutenant Charles Frederick Dumper, Royal Garrison Artillery, attd. 323rd Siege Battery
- Lieutenant Peter Colin Duncan, 2/4th Battalion, Royal West Surrey Regiment
- Captain Ernest McMurchie Dunlop Royal Army Medical Corps, T.Fi, attd. 14th Battalion, Worcestershire Regiment
- Lieutenant Henry Augustus Dupre, 446th Northumberland Field Company, Royal Engineers
- 2nd Lieutenant William Henry Duranty, Royal Garrison Artillery, attd. 199th Siege Battery
- Lieutenant Reginald Tom Durrant, 223rd (Home Counties) Brigade, Royal Field Artillery
- Temp Lieutenant Robert Easten, 69th Field Company, Royal Engineers
- Temp 2nd Lieutenant Percy Tucker Easton, 229th Field Company, Royal Engineers
- Lieutenant Rowland Wynne Eaton, Royal Garrison Artillery, attd. D. A.A. Battery
- Lieutenant Wilfred Austin Ebbels, B/168th Brigade, Royal Field Artillery
- Temp Lieutenant Leonard Oswald Edminson, General List
- Lieutenant The Honourable George Henry Edwardes, Royal Field Artillery, attd. 150th Amy. Brigade, Ammunition Column, Royal Field Artillery
- Captain John Henry Murray Edye, York & Lancaster Regiment
- Lieutenant Edgar Charles Ellen, Honourable Artillery Company, attd. 2/A Battery, 126th Brigade, Royal Field Artillery
- Lieutenant Walter Robert Elliot, 2/20th Battalion, London Regiment
- Lieutenant Arthur Charles Ellis, Royal Field Artillery, attd. Headquarters, 18th Divisional Artillery Column
- Lieutenant Leslie Thomas Elvy, 1/13th Battalion, London Regiment
- Captain Geoffrey Elwell, 6th Battalion, South Staffordshire Regiment
- Lieutenant-Cyril Fullard Entwistle, Royal Garrison Artillery, attd. 235th Siege Battery
- Lieutenant Joseph Entwistle, 428th (East Lancaster) Field Company, Royal Engineers
- Lieutenant James Oliver Ewart, Royal Engineers
- Lieutenant William Noel Exelby, Royal Engineers, attd. 17th Corps. Signal Company, Royal Engineers
- Lieutenant Stanley Stephens Eyre, Royal Field Artillery, attd. 58th London Brigade
- Lieutenant Archibald Brodie Falconer, 5th Battalion, attd. 1/8th Battalion, Royal Scots
- 2nd Lieutenant Stanley Arthur Robert Farrall, Royal Garrison Artillery, attd. 328th Siege Battery
- Quartermaster and Captain Benjamin Farrar, 8th Battalion, West Yorkshire Regiment
- Lieutenant Walter Douglas Faulkner, 2nd Battalion, Irish Guards
- Temp Lieutenant Charles Francis Carew Featherstonhaugh, 11th Battalion, Essex Regiment
- Temp Lieutenant John Scott Finn, 120th Heavy Battery, Royal Garrison Artillery
- Temp Captain The Honourable Harold Edward Fitzclarence, General List, attd. Headquarters, 47th Division
- Lieutenant James Gerald Fitzmaurice, 2nd Battalion, Royal Munster Fusiliers, attd. Tank Corps
- Lieutenant Philip Cawthorne Fletcher, 42nd (East Lancaster) Divisional Signals Company, Royal Engineers
- Lieutenant Arthur Flowers, 25th Divisional Artillery Column, Royal Field Artillery
- Temp Lieutenant David Forgan, 278th Railway Company, Royal Engineers
- Lieutenant Herbert James Forty, 1/7th Battalion, West Riding Regiment
- Temp Captain Reginal Charles Foster, 238th Army Trps. Company, Royal Engineers
- Captain John Stanley Fox, 5th Battalion, Manchester Regiment
- Temp Lieutenant Hugh Cowan Fraser, King's Own Scottish Borderers 10690
- Company Sergeant Major Ernest Frazier DCM 1st Battalion, Worcestershire Regiment
- Lieutenant Richard Arthur Frederick Freeman, Worcestershire Regiment, attd. 11th Battalion, Tank Corps
- Captain Arthur Leslie Irvine Friend, 7th Dragoon Guards
- Temp Captain Edward William Fuggle, 12th Battalion, Nottinghamshire and Derbyshire Regiment
- 2nd Lieutenant Norman de Putron Fuzzey, Royal Garrison Artillery Spec. Reserve, attd. Headquarters, 64th Brigade Royal Garrison Artillery
- Captain Alexander Galloway, Scottish Rifles
- Lieutenant William Ronald Gardiner, Royal Field Artillery, attd. 85th Battery, 11th Brigade, Royal Field Artillery
- Lieutenant Edward Norman Gardner, 6th Battalion, Gloucestershire Regiment, attd. 2/5th Battalion
- Lieutenant Alfred Edward Gayer, Royal Garrison Artillery Spec. Reserve, attd. 2/1st Lowd. Heavy Battery, Royal Garrison Artillery
- Lieutenant Percy Hedon Gibbins, 282nd (London) Army Brigade, Royal Field Artillery
- Lieutenant Robert Withers Jacomb Gibbon, Royal Field Artillery Spec. Reserve, attd. Signal Sub-Section, Royal Engineers, 5th A. Brigade, Royal Horse Artillery
- Rev. John Stanley Gibbs, Royal Army Chaplains' Department, attd. 3rd Cavalry Division
- Temp Captain John Gibson 98th Field Ambulance, Royal Army Medical Corps
- 2nd Lieutenant Alexander Richard Gifford, Royal Field Artillery Spec. Reserve, attd. D/277th (West Lancaster) Brigade, Royal Field Artillery
- Captain Vincent Gunton Gilbey, Royal Field Artillery, attd. 175th Brigade, Ammunition Column, Royal Field Artillery
- Rev. W. Plan Gillieson, Royal Army Chaplains' Department, attd. 51st (Highd) Division
- Temp Lieutenant Clarence William Gladwell, Royal Engineers, attd. 109th Company, Labour Company
- Lieutenant Joseph Henry Goodhart, 20th Hussars
- Quartermaster and Captain William Goodly, 136th Field Ambulance, Royal Army Medical Corps
- Temp Lieutenant Francis Walden Gordon, 32nd Battalion, Machine Gun Corps
- Temp Captain Gerard Stafford Staveley Gordon, 17th Battalion, Northumberland Fusiliers
- Captain James Gordon, Royal Scots, attd. 17th Battalion
- Captain Bertrand William Whichcot Goatling, Royal Fusiliers
- Lieutenant John Romaine Govett, Royal Field Artillery, attd. C/86th Brigade, Royal Field Artillery
- Lieutenant Sydney John Gowland, 5th Battalion, Lancashire Fusiliers, attd. 11th Battalion
- Lieutenant Patrick Ludoric Graham, 2nd Battery, 16th A. Brigade, Royal Horse Artillery
- Rev. Andrew Grant, Royal Army Chaplains' Department, attd. 51st Ddv
- Temp Captain Wilfred Campbell Grant, 93rd Battery, Royal Field Artillery, attd. 280th (London) Brigade, Royal Field Artillery
- Lieutenant Thomas Brunton Grantham, Royal Field Artillery, attd. Headquarters, 33rd Brigade, Royal Field Artillery
- Rev. Samuel Frederick Green, Royal Army Chaplains' Department, attd. 1/4th Battalion, London Regiment
- Temp Lieutenant Walter Green, 2nd Battalion, West Riding Regiment, attd. 10th Trench Mortar Battery
- Captain William Gregson, 57th West Lancaster Divisional Train, Royal Army Service Corps
- Temp Lieutenant Dudley Greville, 9th Battalion, Cheshire Regiment
- Sergeant Major George William Griffin, 1st Battalion, Royal Berkshire Regiment
- Captain Frank Albert Griffiths, 4th Battalion, Royal Welsh Fusiliers, attd. 16th Battalion
- Captain Eric Llewellyn Griffith Griffith-Williams, 135th Battery, 32nd Brigade, Royal Field Artillery
- Captain Frederick Steven Brant Grotrian, 112th Battery, Royal Garrison Artillery
- Captain Lionel Francis Boulderson Groube, Royal Fusiliers
- Captain Francis Henry Guppy, Royal Army Medical Corps, attd. 8th M.A.C.
- Temp Lieutenant Ernest Gower Guthrie, 126th Field Company, Royal Engineers
- Temp Lieutenant Leonard Rome Guthrie, Royal Engineers, Headquarters, 15th Division
- Temp Captain Ernest Leon Maunsell Hackett, 8th Field Ambulance, Royal Army Medical Corps
- Lieutenant John Hadden, Royal Engineers, attd. 20th Divisional Signals Company, Royal Engineers
- Lieutenant William Isaac Haig-Scott, Royal Field Artillery, attd. Headquarters, 93rd A. Brigade, Royal Field Artillery
- Captain Frederick William Hall, 342nd Siege Battery, Royal Garrison Artillery
- Temp Captain James Mitchell Halley, 62nd Field Company, Royal Engineers
- Sergeant Major Benjamin Hallmark, 1st Battalion, Cheshire Regiment
- Temp Lieutenant David Hamilton, 28th Ordnance Workshop (Light), Royal Army Ordnance Corps
- Temp 2nd Lieutenant Howard George Hands, A. Corps Signal Company, Royal Engineers
- Temp Captain Arthur Keith Harding, 10th Battalion, Royal West Kent Regiment
- Lieutenant Leonard Stuart Harland, Dorsetshire Regiment and 4th Supply Company, Tank Corps
- Lieutenant Paxton Harrington, 1/6th Battalion, Argyll and Sutherland Highlanders
- Temp Captain Frederick George Harris, 16th Battalion, Highland Light Infantry
- Lieutenant Rowland Austin Harris, Royal Engineers, attd. 569th (Hampshire.) A.T. Company, Royal Engineers
- Captain Edward Cayley Harrison, Royal Garrison Artillery attd. T. A.A. Battery
- Captain Henry Royston Hart, 1/4th, attd. 1/5th Battalion, Royal Lancaster Regiment
- Captain Seymour Hart, Royal Field Artillery, attd. C/232nd Brigade, Royal Field Artillery
- Lieutenant Geoffrey Hamilton William Hartcup, Dorsetshire Regiment, attd. 213th Siege Battery, Royal Garrison Artillery
- Temp Lieutenant Charles Frederick Harwood, 15th Battalion, Lancashire Fusiliers
- Temp Quartermaster and Lieutenant Frank Walter Hay, 4th Battalion, Machine Gun Corps
- Temp Lieutenant Gerald Patrick Hayes, 204th Siege Battery, Royal Garrison Artillery
- Lieutenant Benjamin William Heaton, 12th Battalion, Manchester Regiment
- Temp 2nd Lieutenant Tom Thackray Heaton, 10th Battalion, Royal Warwickshire Regiment
- Lieutenant David Hendry, Royal Garrison Artillery, attd. 30th Siege Battery, Royal Garrison Artillery
- Temp Lieutenant Percy Henstock, 3rd Battalion, Worcestershire Regiment
- Temp Lieutenant Charles Clifford Henwood, 258th (T.) Company, Royal Engineers
- Quartermaster and Captain Henry Thomas Hester, 1st Battalion, Royal Scots Fusiliers
- Temp 2nd Lieutenant Ernest William Hewland, 15/17th Battalion, West Yorkshire Regiment
- Captain Cecil Albert Heydeman, 2nd Dragoon Guards
- Temp 2nd Lieutenant Roland Heygate, 23rd Battalion, Middlesex Regiment, attd. 123rd Infantry Brigade HQ
- Temp 2nd Lieutenant Torn Aubrey Heywood, 1st Battalion, Tank Corps
- 2nd Lieutenant Peter Hicks, 4th Battalion, East Kent Regiment attd. Intelligence Corps
- Temp 2nd Lieutenant Richard James Hicks, 24th Battalion, Royal Fusiliers
- Temp Captain Samuel Hilton, 9th Battalion, Royal Fusiliers
- Lieutenant Frederick Wystan Hipkins, 1/6th Battalion, Nottinghamshire and Derbyshire Regiment
- Captain Dudley Ashton Hope Hire, 69th Siege Battery, Royal Garrison Artillery
- Captain Adrian Eliot Hodgkin, 1/5th Battalion, Cheshire Regiment, attd. A. Spec. Company, Royal Engineers
- Temp Lieutenant Lennox Holt, attd. 75th BrigadeT Royal Field Artillery
- Temp Lieutenant Charles Edward Hopkinson, General List
- Captain Frederick Geoffrey Hornshaw, 6th Battalion, West Yorkshire Regiment
- Temp 2nd Lieutenant Stanley Whittaker Howard, 13th Battalion, attd. 1st Battalion, East Yorkshire Regiment
- Lieutenant Robert MacDonald Howatt, Royal Army Service Corps, attd. 6/7th Battalion, Royal Scots Fusiliers, attd. 18th Scottish Rifles
- Lieutenant James Leslie Howell, D/44th Brigade, Royal Field Artillery
- Lieutenant Thomas Windlow Howey, 8th Battalion, attd. 1/7th Battalion, Durham Light Infantry
- Temp Lieutenant William Lewis Hoyland, 4th Battalion, North Staffordshire Regiment, secd. 2nd Battalion, Tank Corps
- Captain Philip Herbert Hudson, 1st Battalion, Hampshire Regiment
- Lieutenant Robert Lawrence Hulme, 1/2nd Battalion, London Regiment, secd. 5bth Machine Gun Corps
- Captain Charles Westley Hume, 19th Battalion, London Regiment, attd. 1st Army Signal Company, Royal Engineers
- 2nd Lieutenant Cecil Alfred Hunt, Royal Field Artillery, attd. HQ 39th Brigade, Royal Field Artillery
- 2nd Lieutenant Sydney Alfred Hurxen, Royal Garrison Artillery, attd. 120th Siege Battery, Royal Garrison Artillery
- Lieutenant Ernest Amphlett Huskisson, 1/3rd Battalion, Nottinghamshire and Derbyshire Regiment
- Temp Lieutenant Legh Richmond Hutchison, 33rd Battalion, Machine Gun Corps
- Company Sergeant Major George Frederick Hyde DCM 9th Battalion, East Surrey Regiment
- Company Sergeant Major George Imisson DCM MM 1/4th Battalion, York & Lancaster Regiment
- Captain Harry Infeld, 12th Battalion, London Regiment, emp. Q Spec. Company, Royal Engineers
- Rev. Matthew Tierney Ingram, Royal Army Chaplains' Department
- Captain Cuthbert Irwin, 1/7th Battalion, Cheshire Regiment
- Lieutenant John Henry Ivens, 152nd Siege Battery, Royal Garrison Artillery
- Temp 2nd Lieutenant James Lawrence Jack, 55th Battalion, Machine Gun Corps
- Rev. James Henry Jackman, Royal Army Chaplains' Department, attd. 13th Battalion, Liverpool Regiment
- Temp Captain Ivor Jackson, General List
- 2nd Lieutenant Lawrence Nelson Jackson, Royal Field Artillery attd. D/46th Brigade
- Lieutenant Frank James, Royal Horse Artillery, attd. 3rd Cavalry Divisional Ammunition Column
- Lieutenant Victor Octavius James, 527th (Durham) Field Company, Royal Engineers
- Captain John Puxley White Jamie, 14th Battalion, Leicestershire Regiment
- Temp Lieutenant George Frederick Jervaulx Jarvis, 5th Reserve of Cavalry, attd. 9th Battalion, Yorkshire Regiment
- Lieutenant Ralph Jee, 11th Battalion, Durham Light Infantry
- Lieutenant Percy Jeffs, Royal Field Artillery, attd. 286th Brigade, Royal Field Artillery
- Temp Lieutenant Percival Jennings, S. Corps. Signal Company, Royal Engineers
- Sergeant Major James Jesse, 6th Battalion, Machine Gun Corps
- Temp Lieutenant Nicholas Allen Johns, 31st Battalion, Machine Gun Corps
- Lieutenant Alfred Forbes Johnson, Royal Garrison Artillery, attd. 69th Siege Battery, Royal Garrison Artillery
- Lieutenant Peachy Wilson Johnston, 256th (Highland) Brigade, Royal Field Artillery
- Quartermaster and Lieutenant Charles Alfred Jones, 1/23rd Battalion, London Regiment
- Lieutenant Percy Francis Fitzgerald Keane, 1/18th Battalion, London Regiment
- Temp Lieutenant Frederick Howard Keatch, Royal Artillery
- Lieutenant William Melville Kemmis-Betty, Royal Garrison Artillery, attd. K. A.A. Battery
- Temp Captain Percival Albert Kinward, Royal Army Service Corps
- Lieutenant Harry Wilson Keys, Headquarters, 231st (North Midland) Brigade, Royal Field Artillery
- Temp Lieutenant Albert King, 2nd Battalion, Royal Scots Fusiliers
- Temp Captain Henry Frederick King, General List
- Lieutenant Sidney Chevalier Kirkmari, attd. 72nd-Army Brigade, Royal Field Artillery
- Lieutenant Walter Henry Lace, 439th (Cheshire) Field Company, Royal Engineers, formerly 511th (London) Field Company
- 2nd Lieutenant Frank de Moulfield Laine, 1st Battalion, Royal Guernsey Light Infantry
- Lieutenant John Ker Lamberton, 5th Battalion, Scottish Rifles, secd. 58th Battalion, Machine Gun Corps
- Lieutenant Alfred William Lambourne, Royal Engineers
- Lieutenant Philip Gilbert Lancaster, 1/5th Battalion, East Lancashire Regiment
- Temp Lieutenant John Errington Lang, 3rd Battalion, Royal Berkshire Regiment, attd. 62nd Battalion, Machine Gun Corps
- Lieutenant James Edward Charles Langham, 5th Battalion, Royal Sussex Regiment, attd. 8th Battalion
- Captain Alan Frederick Lascelles, 1/1st Bedford Yeomanry, attd. 15th Hussars
- Temp Captain Frank Herbert Lathbury, 181st Tunneling Company, Royal Engineers
- Captain William R. Law, 7th Battalion, Scottish Rifles, attd. 74th Divisional Signals Company, Royal Engineers
- Temp Captain Philip Henry Lawless, General List
- Lieutenant Edward Charles Lawson, 2nd Battalion, Middlesex Regiment
- Temp Lieutenant George Francis Laycock, 180th Tunneling Company, Royal Engineers
- Lieutenant William Lead, 15th Divisional Artillery Column, Royal Field Artillery
- Temp Captain Arthur Brian Leake, General List, attd. 102nd Infantry Brigade
- Temp Captain Walter Burditt Leane, Royal Engineers
- Lieutenant Ralph Bertram le Cornu, Royal Army Service Corps, attd. 5th Battalion, Dorsetshire Regiment
- Captain Roland le Fanu, Leicestershire Regiment
- Lieutenant Arthur Francis Leighton, Royal Field Artillery, attd. 10th Battery, 147th Brigade
- Rev. William Watson Leonard, Royal Army Chaplains' Department, attd. 56th Division
- Captain Davis Lewis, 3rd Battalion, London Regiment
- 2nd Lieutenant Frank Lewis DCM 1st Battalion, Scottish Rifles, attd. 9th Battalion, Highland Light Infantry, T.P
- Lieutenant Herbert Earl Charles Lewis, 46th Divisional Signals Company, Royal Engineers
- Lieutenant Valentine Place Ley son, 3rd Battalion, South Lancashire Regiment, attd. 3rd Field Survey Battalion, Royal Engineers
- Temp Lieutenant James William Lipscomb, 16th Battalion, King's Royal Rifle Corps
- Temp Captain Ernest Hugh Llewellyn, General List
- Lieutenant Bertie Lloyd, C/275th (West Lancaster) Brigade, Royal Field Artillery
- Captain Roderick Croil Lloyd, 1/1st Denbigh Yeomanry
- Quartermaster and Captain Patrick Barnard Loakman, 1/7th Battalion, Cheshire Regiment
- Lieutenant Frederick James Lockington, 2nd Battalion, South Lancashire Regiment
- Captain Cecil William Lockwood, 2/4th, attd. 5th Battalion, West Riding Regiment
- Temp Captain Isaac Vernon Longley, Railway Optg. Division, Royal Engineers
- Captain Arthur Lord, D/246th (West Riding) Brigade, Royal Field Artillery
- Lieutenant Merlin Forster Loxton, Royal Field Artillery, attd. 114th Brigade, Royal Field Artillery
- Lieutenant Alfred Basil Lubbock, 1/3rd (Wessex) Brigade, Royal Field Artillery, attd. 52nd Brigade, Royal Field Artillery
- 2nd Lieutenant Henry Joseph Lucas DCM MM 2nd Battalion Yorkshire Regiment
- Lieutenant Cyril Gordon Luchford, 14th Battalion, Northumberland Fusiliers
- Temp Lieutenant Frank Ludlam, B/107th Brigade, Royal Field Artillery
- Lieutenant Philip Lumley, Royal Garrison Artillery, attd. 137th Siege Battery, Royal Garrison Artillery
- Captain Edenby Gordon Lutyens, D/23rd Brigade, Royal Field Artillery
- Temp Captain Robert Charles Lyle, 81st Company, Royal Army Service Corps, attd. 3rd Cavalry, Division HQ
- 2nd Lieutenant George Macdonald, Royal Field Artillery, attd. 110th Brigade, Royal Field Artillery
- Captain James Macdonald, Royal Field Artillery, attd. B/187th Brigade, Royal Field Artillery
- Company Sergeant Major John McDonald DCM 1/8th Battalion, Argyll and Sutherland Highlanders
- Lieutenant John Duncan Macdonald, Royal Artillery
- Temp Lieutenant Laurin MacEwan, Royal Field Artillery
- Temp Lieutenant Thomas Macfie, 1st Battalion, Scottish Rifles
- Lieutenant Lovel Durant Mack, 211th (East Lancaster) Brigade, Royal Field Artillery
- Lieutenant Frederick William Mackay, 1/4th Battalion, Yorkshire Light Infantry
- 2nd Lieutenant Norman Douglas MacKay, 80th Field Company, Royal Engineers
- Temp Lieutenant Colin John Mackenzie-Grieve, General List
- Temp Captain Roperic William Macklin, Royal Garrison Artillery, attd. 50th Siege Battery, Royal Garrison Artillery
- Temp Captain Roswell Murray MacTavish, General List
- Captain George R. Madge, Royal Engineers
- Temp Captain Harry Maitland Maitland, Special List, attd. Intelligence Corps
- Lieutenant Robert Graham Mann, 5th, attd. 5/6th Battalion, Royal Scots
- Lieutenant Henry Vaughan Markham, Royal Garrison Artillery, attd. Headquarters, 2nd Brigade, Royal Garrison Artillery
- Temp Lieutenant Harry Lewis Marsh, 16th Battalion, Royal Welsh Fusiliers
- Temp 2nd Lieutenant William Marshall, 49th Battalion, Machine Gun Corps
- Lieutenant Alfred Guy Trice Martin, Royal Field Artillery, attd. Headquarters, 112th Brigade, Royal Field Artillery
- Company Sergeant Major Charles Martin DCM 1st Battalion, Nottinghamshire and Derbyshire Regiment
- Lieutenant Norman Todd Martin, attd. 104th Brigade, Royal Field Artillery
- 2nd Lieutenant George Herbert Mason, Royal Garrison Artillery, attd. 193rd Siege Battery, Royal Garrison Artillery
- Captain George Leslie Matthews, 1st (London) San. Company, Royal Army Medical Corps
- Temp Lieutenant Harold Killegrew Matthews, 1st Field Survey Company, Royal Engineers
- Lieutenant Frederick McBride, 3rd Battalion, Coldstream Guards
- Lieutenant Charles Edwin Albert Mc.Carthy, Headquarters, 18th A. Brigade, Royal Field Artillery
- Temp Captain Charles Walter McConnan, 8th Battalion, Border Regiment, attd. 2nd Battalion, Lincolnshire Regiment
- Captain William Russell McCrae, 2/1st (Lancaster) Heavy Battery, Royal Garrison Artillery
- Lieutenant Samuel McDermott, Royal Garrison Artillery, attd. 186th Siege Battery
- Temp Captain James Matheson McIver, 206th Field Company, Royal Engineers
- Temp 2nd Lieutenant Alexander McKendrick, Highland Light Infantry, attd. 12th Battalion, Royal Scots Fusiliers
- Temp Lieutenant Septimus Oswin McLearen, 20th Battalion, Machine Gun Corps
- Temp 2nd Lieutenant Thomas Ronaldson McMillan, Royal Army Service Corps, attd. 346th Siege Battery, Royal Garrison Artillery
- 2nd Lieutenant Herbert Meathrel DCM Royal Field Artillery, attd. C/290th (London) Brigade, Royal Field Artillery
- Temp Lieutenant James Aitken Brown Menzies, 208th Siege Battery, Royal Garrison Artillery
- Temp Lieutenant Guy Mercer, General List
- Lieutenant Harold Middlewood, Royal Garrison Artillery, attd. P. A.A. Battery
- Lieutenant Robert William Miles DCM Royal Field Artillery, attd. 170th Brigade, Royal Field Artillery
- Lieutenant Robert MacGregor Millar, Somerset Light Infantry, attd. Royal Engineers Signal Company, 3rd Tank Brigade
- Temp Lieutenant Arthur Warren Millard, 25th A.T. Company, Royal Engineers
- Temp Lieutenant Gordon Mitchell, 154th Field Company, Royal Engineers
- Lieutenant Eric Edward Mockler-Ferryman, 29th Brigade, Headquarters, Royal Field Artillery
- Captain Kenneth Macrae Moir, 5th Battalion, East Surrey Regiment, attd. 29th Battalion, Machine Gun Corps
- Temp Lieutenant Charles Beresford Montgomery, 1st Battalion, Lancashire Fusiliers
- Captain Arthur Moon, 8th Battalion, London Regiment
- Temp Quartermaster and Lieutenant James Moore, 16th Field Ambulance, Royal Army Medical Corps
- Lieutenant Vivian John Moore, Royal Garrison Artillery, attd. 85th Brigade
- Lieutenant Frank Morgan, Royal Garrison Artillery, attd. 352nd Siege Battery, Royal Garrison Artillery
- Temp Lieutenant Walter Beveridge Morgan, 9th Battalion, Royal Welsh Fusiliers
- Captain Temple Morris, 21st Heavy Battery, Royal Garrison Artillery
- Temp Lieutenant George Muir, Royal Engineers, attd. 29th (1/1st London) Divisional Signals Company, Royal Engineers
- Lieutenant James Lees Murgatroyd, Royal Engineers, attd. No. 5 (Royal Anglesey) Field Company
- Lieutenant Charles Murray, 115th Siege Battery, Royal Garrison Artillery
- Temp Sergeant Major George Murray, Scots Guards, attd. 1/4th Battalion, King's Own Scottish Borderers
- Lieutenant John Kininmonth Murray, 5th Battalion, Royal Scots Fusiliers
- Captain Frederick William Musgrave, 1/6th Battalion, West Yorkshire Regiment
- Captain William Edward Stirling Napier, Lothians and Border Horse, and 61st Battalion, Machine Gun Corps
- Temp Lieutenant Frederick Charles Nawton, 15th Battalion, Machine Gun Corps
- Temp Captain William Edward Walter Naylor, 10th Battalion, East Yorkshire Regiment
- Lieutenant Harold Thomas Nelmes, 1/2nd Battalion, Monmouthshire Regiment
- Captain John Walron Nelson, 156th Heavy Battery, Royal Garrison Artillery
- Captain Clark Nicholson Royal Army Medical Corps, attd. 49th Field Ambulance
- Lieutenant Earl David Nicoll, 4th, attd. 6th, Battalion, Royal Highlanders
- 2nd Lieutenant Guy Harsant Norman, Royal Garrison Artillery, attd. 129th Siege Battery
- Temp Lieutenant Sidney North, Royal Warwickshire Regiment, attd. 1/5th Battalion, Lancashire Fusiliers
- Lieutenant Cyril Tait O'Callaghan, 1st Royal Dragoons
- Captain Arthur Patrick O'Connor 11th Field Ambulance, Royal Army Medical Corps
- Captain William Julian Odium, Royal Field Artillery, attd. Headquarters, 27th Brigade, Royal Field Artillery
- 2nd Lieutenant Edgar Oldham, Royal Garrison Artillery, attd. 135th Heavy Battery, Royal Garrison Artillery
- 2nd Lieutenant Sydney Alfred Oldham, Royal Garrison Artillery, attd. 4th Siege Battery, Royal Garrison Artillery
- Captain George Barry Oliver, 4th Battalion, Leicestershire Regiment, attd. 14th Battalion
- Temp 2nd Lieutenant George Upton O'Meara, 15th Battalion, Tank Corps
- Captain John Orr-Ewing, 16th Lancers
- Captain Roland George Orred, Royal Fusiliers
- Lieutenant Leslie Charles Cameron Owen, Royal Irish Fusiliers
- Temp Lieutenant Hugh Ffolliott-Ozanne, Royal Field Artillery
- 2nd Lieutenant R. Alderney, Artillery
- Temp 2nd Lieutenant Henry Arthur Kivers Pantlin, 5th Battalion, Royal Berkshire Regiment, attd. 35th Trench Mortar Battery
- Captain Hugh Ford Parbury, 17th Lancers
- Lieutenant Kingsley Croft Parker, Royal Garrison Artillery, attd. 145th Siege Battery
- Temp Quartmaster and Captain Charles Walter Patch, 15th Battalion, Lancashire Fusiliers
- Temp Captain Alexander McCulloch Paterson, 248th Field Company, Royal Engineers
- Captain George Arthur Reginald Paterson, 7th Battalion, Gordon Highlanders
- Sergeant Major Samuel Alfred Patman, 56th Field Ambulance, Royal Army Medical Corps
- Captain John Henry Alexander Patton, Royal Irish Rifles, attd. 15th Battalion
- Lieutenant Arthur Forman Balfour Paul, 457th Field Company, Royal Engineers
- Lieutenant Arthur Henry Paull, 1/5th Battalion, Duke of Cornwall's Light Infantry
- Temp Lieutenant Richard Pearce, Labour Corps, attd. 23rd Battalion, Lancashire Fusiliers
- Temp 2nd Lieutenant Geoffrey Lockington Pearson, 50th Battalion, Machine Gun Corps
- Temp Lieutenant Francis Richard Jonathan Peel, attd. 148th Brigade, Royal Field Artillery
- Lieutenant John Perry, Royal Field Artillery, attd. 3rd Brigade, Royal Horse Artillery, Amn. Col
- Lieutenant Arthur Todd Phillips, 135th A.T. Company, Royal Engineers
- Captain Charles Kendall Phillips, West Yorkshire Regiment, attd. 62nd Divisional Signals Company, Royal Engineers
- Lieutenant Basil Henry Pickering, 18th Battalion, York & Lancaster Regiment, formerly West Yorkshire Regiment
- Temp Lieutenant Kenneth Twyneham Pike, 74th Battalion, Machine Gun Corps
- Temp Lieutenant Gonne St. Clair Pilcher, Special List, attd. Intelligence Corps
- Lieutenant Gerald Arthur Pilleau, 1st Battalion, Royal West Surrey Regiment
- Captain Hugh Tunbridge Pomfret, 17th Battalion, Manchester Regiment
- Lieutenant Charles William Miller Potts, 50th Divl, Royal Engineers
- Temp 2nd Lieutenant George Potts, 121st Field Company, Royal Engineers
- Lieutenant Henry Rupert Powell, 556th (Glamorgan) A.T. Company, Royal Engineers
- Temp Captain James Farquharson Powell, Royal Army Medical Corps, attd. Headquarters, 76th Brigade, Royal Garrison Artillery
- Lieutenant Lawrence Powell, Royal Field Artillery, attd. Headquarters, 121st Brigade, Royal Field Artillery
- Lieutenant Kingsmoll Foster Manley Power, 1/7th Battalion, Cheshire Regiment
- Temp Captain George Pride, 10th Battalion, Scottish Rifles
- Lieutenant Harold Gordon Lusby Prynne, 1/13th Battalion, London Regiment
- Rev. Harold Septimus Pugh, Royal Army Chaplains' Department, attd. 68th Brigade, Royal Garrison Artillery
- Captain Harold James Pullein-Thompson, Royal West Surrey Regiment
- Lieutenant George Frederick Pykett, Royal Warwickshire Regiment
- Temp Lieutenant Charles Henry Quin, 7th Battalion, Royal Inniskilling Fusiliers, attd. 34th Battalion, London Regiment
- Lieutenant Edward Ralph, Royal Garrison Artillery, attd. 210th Siege Battery
- Captain Edward Ramsden, 5th Lancers
- Captain William Havelock Chaplin Ramsden, East Yorkshire Regiment, attd. 35th Battalion, Machine Gun Corps
- Lieutenant Charles Thompson Ranken, Royal Field Artillery
- Lieutenant Thomas Frederick Rawle, South Wales Borderers, attd. 1st Battalion
- Lieutenant John Brannan Raymond, 3/6th Battalion, East Surrey Regiment, attd. 1/5th Battalion, Nottinghamshire and Derbyshire Regiment
- Lieutenant Sidney Read, 1/5th Battalion, London Regiment
- Temp Captain Charles Reginald Reckitt, Royal Army Medical Corps, attd. 26th Brigade, Royal Field Artillery
- Lieutenant Charles Edward Reed, 64th Siege Battery, Royal Garrison Artillery
- Lieutenant Frederick Reid, Signal Section, Royal Engineers, attd. V. Corps, Heavy Artillery
- Lieutenant Alexander Frederick Gordon Renton, 11th Hussars
- Temp Captain William Wylie Rentoul, East Lancashire Regiment, attd. 1/4th Battalion, Shropshire Light Infantry
- Temp Captain Ernest Percy Reynolds, 37th Signal Company, Royal Engineers
- Captain Henry Edward Sutherland Richards 2/1st West Lancaster Field Ambulance, Royal Army Medical Corps
- Temp Lieutenant William Watson Richards, Royal Army Ordnance Depot
- 2nd Lieutenant Roy Hurley Rickard, Royal Garrison Artillery, attd. 120th Siege Battery
- Rev. James Sidney Dundas Rider, Royal Army Chaplains' Department, attd. 19th Hussars
- Temp Captain Thomas Kenneth Gordon Ridley, 17th Battalion, Worcestershire Regiment, formerly 12th Battalion, Yorkshire Regiment
- Lieutenant Thomas Rigby, attd. 77th Brigade, Royal Field Artillery
- Lieutenant Joseph Maitland Ripley, Royal Artillery, attd. I. Battery, Royal Horse Artillery
- Lieutenant John George Ferrier Robb, Royal Garrison Artillery, attd. 286th Siege Battery, Royal Garrison Artillery
- Temp Captain Algernon Bruce Pryor Roberts, General List, attd. Tank Corps
- Temp Captain David Robertson, General List
- Captain Duncan Irvine Robertson, 1/7th Battalion, Argyll and Sutherland Highlanders
- Lieutenant John Robertson, Cameron Highlanders, attd. 1st Battalion 240017
- Company Sergeant Major Arthur Robinson, 1/6th Battalion, Liverpool Regiment
- Lieutenant Claude Robinson, Royal Field Artillery
- Captain Douglas Charles Robinson, Royal Lancaster Regiment
- Rev. Edgar Vivian Robinson, Royal Army Chaplains' Department, attd. 1st Battalion, South Wales Borderers
- Temp Captain Falkland Robinson, 30th Brigade, Royal Garrison Artillery
- 2nd Lieutenant Harry Hambrook Robinson, 24th Battalion, Machine Gun Corps
- Rev. Daniel Roche, Royal Army Chaplains' Department, attd. 7/8th Battalion, Royal Inniskilling Fusiliers
- Captain Frederick Ernest Woodham Rogers, 2/3rd (Home Counties) Field Ambulance, Royal Army Medical Corps
- Temp Lieutenant Frederic Houghton Rogers, 255th Tunneling Company, Royal Engineers
- Rev. Louis Rogers, Royal Army Chaplains' Department, attd. 38th Labour Group
- Captain Leonard Ropner, Royal Garrison Artillery, attd. 308th Siege Battery
- Captain Clarence Henry Rose, 5th Battalion, Yorkshire Regiment, attd. 51st Battalion, Machine Gun Corps
- Temp Lieutenant Edward Andrew Ross, 13th Battalion, Manchester Regiment, attd. 1/8th Battalion
- Lieutenant John Ross, Royal Garrison Artillery, attd. 200th Siege Battery
- Temp Quartermaster and Captain Reginald Henry Rossiter, 10th Battalion, Royal Warwickshire Regiment
- Lieutenant George Noel Royce, Nottinghamshire and Derbyshire Regiment, attd. 42nd Battalion, Machine Gun Corps
- Lieutenant Arthur Eaton Rusher, 378th Battery, 169th Brigade, Royal Field Artillery
- Lieutenant Godfrey Laird Rutherford, 5th Battalion, Durh
- 2nd Lieutenant John Sabiston, Royal Field Artillery, attd. B/311th (West Riding) Brigade, Royal Field Artillery
- Captain James Roy Saidler, Royal Garrison Artillery, attd. 70th Brigade
- Lieutenant Owen Jeremy Sangar, Royal Garrison Artillery, attd. Heavy Artillery, 8th Corps
- Temp Lieutenant Reginald Henry Sawyer, Royal Marine Artillery
- Lieutenant Lyle Cooper Schlotel, Royal Garrison Artillery, attd. 263rd Siege Battery
- Lieutenant Alexander Balfour Scott, Royal Field Artillery, attd. Headquarters, 32nd Divisional Artillery
- Rev. Andrew Boyd Scott Royal Army Chaplains' Department
- Lieutenant Aubrey Heylyn Scott, Royal Field Artillery, attd. Headquarters, 15th Brigade, Royal Field Artillery
- Temp Lieutenant Wilfred Scurr, E. Corps Signal Company, Royal Engineers
- Temp Captain Albert Harold Searl, 17th Battalion, Royal Welsh Fusiliers
- Lieutenant Richard Wilcock Sellers, Middlesex Regiment
- Sergeant Major John Sephton, 2nd Battalion, Nottinghamshire and Derbyshire Regiment
- Temp Lieutenant George Colby Sharpin, 1st Battalion, Bedfordshire Regiment
- Temp Lieutenant Egbert-Wilfred George Simpson, 63rd Battalion, Machine Gun Corps
- Temp Lieutenant James Herfeert-Simpson, 16th Battalion, Royal Irish Rifles
- Lieutenant Charles Alan Slatford, Royal Garrison Artillery, attd. 133rd Siege Battery
- Temp Captain Arthur Boyson Slee, Royal Field Artillery, attd. O. A.A. Battery
- Company Sergeant Major Thomas John Sloley DCM 9th Battalion, Machine Gun Corps
- Lieutenant John Edward Smales, 9th Battalion, Durham Light Infantry
- Lieutenant Frank Barton Smith, 1/12th Battalion, North Lancashire Regiment
- Temp Captain Frederick William Smith, General List
- Temp Captain Kenneth Percival Smith, 5th Battalion, Northamptonshire Regiment
- Temp Quartermaster and Lieutenant Thomas Smith, 11th Battalion, Royal Lancaster Regiment
- Captain Norman Smithers, 4th Battalion, Royal West Kent Regiment
- 2nd Lieutenant Walter Thomas Snelling, Royal Field Artillery, attd. D/189th Brigade, Royal Field Artillery
- Lieutenant Thomas William Snow, C/286th (West Lancaster) Brigade, Royal Field Artillery
- Temp Lieutenant William Samuel Stebbing, 16th Battalion, Royal Warwickshire Regiment
- Temp Lieutenant William Steele, 15th Battalion, Highland Light Infantry
- Lieutenant John Stenson, Headquarters, 18th Brigade, Royal Garrison Artillery
- Captain Ronald William Stevenson, 8th Battalion, Worcestershire Regiment
- Temp Captain George Innes Stewart, 8th Battalion, Royal Highlanders, attd. 26th Light Trench Mortar Battery
- Lieutenant Henry John Edwin Stinson, Royal Garrison Artillery, attd. 11th Heavy Battery, Royal Garrison Artillery
- Captain Ralph Lambton Stobart, 1/1st Northumberland Hussars
- Quartermaster and Captain Vyvyan Ernest Stock, 1st Battalion, Middlesex Regiment
- Temp Captain Stanley Parke Stoker Royal Army Medical Corps, attd. 1/6th Battalion, West Riding Regiment
- 2nd Lieutenant Robert Sebastian Stott, 5th Battalion, Lancashire Fusiliers, attd. 10th Battalion
- Temp Captain Thomas Dudley Steward, General List
- Lieutenant John Robert Shuckburgh Stranack, Seaforth Highlanders, attd. 9th Battalion
- Lieutenant John Stephens Stranaghan, Honourable Artillery Company
- Company Sergeant Major John Stuart MM 7th Battalion, Gordon Highlanders
- Temp Lieutenant Eric Owen Stubbings, 247th Field Company, Royal Engineers
- Temp Captain Douglas Stewart-Tailyour, B/94th Brigade, Royal Field Artillery
- Temp Lieutenant Henry Tatham, 256th Tunneling Company, Royal Engineers
- Lieutenant Lewin Graham Mackworth Taverner, Royal Field Artillery, attd. 59th Brigade, Royal Field Artillery
- Captain Arthur Turner Taylor, 1/2nd Battalion, London Regiment
- Captain David Taylor, 51st Divisional Train, Royal Army Service Corps
- 2nd Lieutenant Harold Edgar Taylor, Royal Field Artillery
- Lieutenant Robert Emery Taylor, Middlesex Regiment
- Lieutenant Roy Stanhope Tennent, 6th Battalion, North Staffordshire Regiment
- Lieutenant John Leslie Tetlow, 1/7th Battalion, West Riding Regiment
- Temp Captain Leonard Samuel Henry Thomas, 19th Battalion, Welsh Regiment
- Lieutenant William George Thomas, 1st (London) Brigade, Royal Field Artillery, attd. B/77th Brigade, Royal Field Artillery
- Lieutenant Mervyn Edward Stanley Thompson, Headquarters, 169th Brigade, Royal Field Artillery
- Lieutenant Robert Nathaniel Thompson, 4th Battalion, Yorkshire Light Infantry
- Lieutenant Charles Ferguson Thomson, Highland Division, Royal Engineers
- Lieutenant Thomas Bentley Stewart Thomson, 9th Battalion, Highland Light Infantry, secd. to Royal Engineers
- Temp 2nd Lieutenant Fred Thurlby, 200th Field Company, Royal Engineers
- Sergeant Major William Tilbury, 5th Battalion, Royal Berkshire Regiment
- Captain Herbert Charles Coningsby Tippet, 4th Battalion, Royal Dublin Fusiliers
- Lieutenant Edward le Marchant Trafford, 1st Life Guards, attd. No. 1 (1st Life Guards) Battalion, Guards Machine Gun Regiment
- Captain Robert Cecil Trousdale DSO South Lancashire Regiment
- Temp Captain Henry Tudsbery Tudsbery, Royal Engineers
- Lieutenant Roger William Turnbull, 5th (London) Brigade, Royal Field Artillery
- Lieutenant Gerald Unsworth, Royal Warwickshire Regiment, attd. 1/4th Battalion, York & Lancaster Regiment
- Captain Croxton Sillery Vale, Royal Army Service Corps, attd. Heavy Artillery, XV. Corps
- Captain Claude Max Vallentin, 27th Battery, 32nd Brigade, Royal Field Artillery
- Temp Lieutenant Percy Keough Vere, 19th Battalion, Machine Gun Corps
- Lieutenant Wilfred Clement Von Berg, 1/0th Battalion, London Regiment
- Captain Ralph Ernest Vyvyan, Worcestershire Regiment, attd. Royal Engineers
- Lieutenant Francis Vyvyan-Robinson, Royal Engineers, attd. 1st Siege Company
- Temp Captain George Gordon Waddington, 444th Siege Battery, Royal Garrison Artillery
- Lieutenant Francis Harold Waite, 5th Battalion, West Riding Regiment
- Dt. Charles William Walker, 58th (London) Divisional Signal Company, Royal Engineers
- Quartermaster and Captain George Henry Wall, 3rd Battalion, Grenadier Guards
- Quartermaster and Captain John Richard Wall, 2/8th Battalion, Worcestershire Regiment
- Lieutenant Alexander Steven Wallace, Royal Field Artillery, attd. Headquarters, 46th Brigade, Royal Field Artillery
- Temp Lieutenant Frederic Ritchie Walls, 49th (West Riding) Divisional Signals Company, Royal Engineers
- Temp Lieutenant Holwell Hely Hutchinson Walshe, Headquarters, 9th Brigade, Royal Field Artillery
- Lieutenant Franz Wilfrid Walter, Royal Garrison Artillery, attd. 119th Siege Battery
- Lieutenant David John Walters, Royal Garrison Artillery, attd. Headquarters, 49th Brigade
- Captain Bertrand Thomas Ward, 19th Battalion, London Regiment
- Lieutenant John Leveson Ward, Nottinghamshire and Derbyshire Regiment
- Lieutenant Leslie Rushworth Ward, 113th Heavy Battery, Royal Garrison Artillery
- Temp Captain Thomas Leonard Ward, General List
- Battery Sergeant Major Joseph Henry Ware, D/79th Brigade, Royal Field Artillery
- Lieutenant Edward Price Warlters, Royal Garrison Artillery, attd. 256th Siege Battery, Royal Garrison Artillery
- Temp Lieutenant Joseph Henry Watkins, No. 81 Motor Amb. Section, Royal Engineers
- Lieutenant Arthur Cecil Burness Watts, 9th Battalion, Middlesex Regiment, Seed. Signal Service, Royal Engineers
- Captain Charles Edward Wauhope, 400th Battery, Royal Field Artillery
- Lieutenant Aynsley Mills Webster, Royal Field Artillery, attd. Signal Sub-Section, 119th A. Brigade, Royal Field Artillery
- Lieutenant Alfred Bernard Weekes, B/180th Brigade, Royal Field Artillery
- Captain David Henderson Weir, Royal Army Medical Corps, attd. 112th Field Ambulance
- Lieutenant William Arthur Welch, 66th (East Lancaster) Divisional Train, Royal Army Service Corps
- Lieutenant Charles William Welton, Royal Garrison Artillery, attd. 278th Siege Battery, Royal Garrison Artillery
- Temp 2nd Lieutenant Gordon Leake White, 12th Battalion, East Surrey Regiment
- Temp Captain Brian Whitehead, Royal Army Medical Corps, attd. 59th Divn. HQ
- Temp Lieutenant Angus McIntosh Whyte, 2nd Battalion, Tank Corps
- 2nd Lieutenant Owen Arthur Widdowson, Royal Garrison Artillery, attd. 484th Siege Battery, Royal Garrison Artillery
- Temp 2nd Lieutenant Percy Wild, 108th Labour Company, Labour Corps
- Temp Captain William Henry Albert Wilkins, 10th Battalion, South Wales Borderers
- Lieutenant Dudley Williams, Royal Field Artillery, attd. 4th Army A.A. Defences
- Temp Captain Herbert Farrar Williams, 11th Battalion, East Yorkshire Regiment
- Lieutenant Keith Williams, Royal Garrison Artillery, attd. 158th Siege Battery, Royal Garrison Artillery
- Temp 2nd Lieutenant Thomas Williams, 34th Battalion, Machine Gun Corps
- Captain George Arthur Wilmot, Royal Warwickshire Regiment, attd. 15th Battalion
- Captain Charles Watts Wilson, 2/6th Battalion, Liverpool Regiment
- Lieutenant Gerald Temple Wilson, Royal Field Artillery, attd. T. A.A. Battery
- Temp 2nd Lieutenant James Hourston Wilson, No. 9 Foreway Company, Royal Engineers
- Lieutenant Sydney Grahame Wilson, 2/14th Battalion, London Regiment
- Sergeant Major Joseph William Windmill DCM 16th Battalion, Royal Warwickshire Regiment
- Lieutenant Henry Dacres Wise, 18th Hussars
- Gerald Fergus Wood, Royal Engineers
- Lieutenant Noel Edward Walter Wood, Royal Field Artillery
- Lieutenant Tom Wood, 7th Dragoon Guards, attd. Tank Corps
- Captain Richard Montague Wootten, 6th Innis Dragoons
- Lieutenant Robert Douglas Worrall, Royal Horse Artillery, attd. D/298th Brigade, Royal Field Artillery
- Lieutenant Samuel Worrall, Royal Garrison Artillery, attd. 277th Siege Battery, Royal Garrison Artillery
- Temp Captain Ralph Marcus Meaburn Worsley, Royal Garrison Artillery, attd. 1/2nd Lancaster Heavy Battery, Royal Garrison Artillery
- Temp Captain Ralph Heron Worthington, General List
- Sergeant Major William John Wrapson, 6th Battalion, Dorsetshire Regiment
- Quartermaster and Captain William Bertie Wray, 1/22nd Battalion, London Regiment
- Lieutenant Arthur Edward James Wright, 16th Battery, 41st Brigade, Royal Field Artillery
- Temp Lieutenant David Porter Wright, 2nd Battalion, Scottish Rifles
- 2nd Lieutenant John William Wright, Lincolnshire Regiment, attd. 1st Battalion
- Captain Philip Arton Wright, 62nd (West Riding) Divisional Train, Royal Army Service Corps
- Temp Captain John Wylie Royal Army Medical Corps, attd. 6th Battalion, East Yorkshire Regiment
- Lieutenant Thomas Henry Yalden, 1st Battalion, East Surrey Regiment
- Lieutenant Arthur Edward Yapp, Headquarters, 47th Brigade, Royal Garrison Artillery
- Temp Captain Geoffrey Arthur Douglas Youl, attd. 159th Brigade, Royal Field Artillery
- Temp Lieutenant Alfred Young, 15th Battalion, Durham Light Infantry
- Temp Captain John Edgar Young, Royal Army Veterinary Corps, attd. Headquarters, 34th Brigade, Royal Field Artillery
- Temp Lieutenant John Stirling Young, 1st Battalion, Royal Highlanders
- Lieutenant Norman Harold Zimmern, 1/8th Battalion, Lancashire Fusiliers

Canadian Force

- Honorary Captain Frank Guy Armitage, Canadian Young Men's Christian Association Services
- Lieutenant James Ballantyne, Royal Canadian Regiment, Nova Scotia Regiment
- Quartermaster and Captain Thomas Barclay, 13th Canadian Field Ambulance, Canadian Army Medical Corps
- Captain Kenneth Hubert Bovill, Canadian Field Artillery, Headquarters, 5th Canadian Division Artillery
- Lieutenant Charles Chandler Brooks, Canadian Machine Gun Corps, attd. Intelligence Corps
- Lieutenant John William Moore Carey, 78th Battalion, Canadian Infantry
- Captain John Hawland Chipman, 15th Battalion, Canadian Infantry
- Honorary Captain James Clarke, Canadian Young Men's Christian Association Services
- Lieutenant Harry Frederick Charles Cocks, 5th Canadian Mounted Rifles Battalion
- Temp Captain Edward Francis Coke, 8th Battalion, Canadian Infantry
- Honorary Captain John William Coupe, Royal Canadian Regiment, Nova Scotia Regiment
- Captain Veysie Curran, 27th Battalion, Canadian Infantry
- Temp Lieutenant Vladimir Curtis, 24th Battalion, Canadian Infantry
- Captain Francis Murray Daweon, 8th Battalion, Canadian Engineers
- Lieutenant Alexandre Deslauriers, 22nd Battalion, Canadian Infantry
- Captain Geoffrey Noel Douglas, 2nd Canadian Machine Gun Corps
- Lieutenant James Lewis Duncan, Canadian Field Artillery
- Captain James Ewen Eastlake, Canadian Field Artillery
- Captain William Arthur Grafftey, 42nd Battalion, Canadian Infantry
- Captain Alexander Aitken Gray, 76th Battalion, Canadian Infantry
- Temp Captain Bernard Cecil Hall MM 3rd Tunneling Company, Canadian Engineers
- Temp Captain Stanley Horace Hawkins, 10th Battalion, Canadian Engineers
- Lieutenant Arthur Ernest Hopper, 1st Heavy Battery, Canadian Garrison Artillery
- Captain Eric Ian Henry Ings, 3rd Battalion, Canadian Machine Gun Corps
- Sergeant Major James Kay DCM 16th Battalion, Canadian Infantry
- Captain Edwin John Lovelace, 4th Canadian Divisional Artillery Column, Canadian Field Artillery
- Lieutenant Findlay Malcolm Macdonald, 4th Battalion, Canadian Machine Gun Corps
- Captain Colin MacKay, 12th Siege Battery, Canadian Garrison Artillery
- Honorary Captain John George McKay, Canadian Young Men's Christian Association Services
- Lieutenant John James MacKenzie, 8th A. Brigade, Canadian Field Artillery
- Captain Gordon Allison Medcalfe, Canadian Garrison Artillery, sec. to 443rd S. Battery, Royal Garrison Artillery
- Captain Donald Stanley Montgomery, 29th Battalion, Canadian Infantry
- Temp Captain William McLeod Moore, 46th Battalion, Canadian Infantry
- Captain Arthur McIntyre Morrison DCM 6th Battalion, Canadian Engineers
- Lieutenant Lennox Pelham Napier, Canadian Field Artillery
- Captain Henry Grattan Nolan, 49th Battalion, Canadian Infantry
- Lieutenant Herbert Braid Northwood, 78th Battalion, Canadian Infantry
- Lieutenant James Paterson, 1st Canadian Mounted Rifles Battalion
- Lieutenant Harry Leslie Petrie, 44th Battalion, Canadian Infantry
- Quartermaster and Captain Gordon Barry Pierce, 50th Battalion, Canadian Infantry
- Captain Thomas Hall Plumer, Canadian Army Service Corps
- Quartermaster and Major James Pringle, 26th Battalion, Canadian Infantry
- Captain Anthony Meredith Reid, 2nd Battalion, Canadian Engineers
- Temp Captain Alfred Hubert Rowberry, 2nd Battalion, Canadian Mounted Rifles
- Captain Gerald Stuart Rutherford, 52nd Battalion, Canadian Infantry
- Captain Reginald George Saunders, Headquarters, 2nd Brigade, Canadian Engineers
- Lieutenant Edward Baldwin Savage, Canadian Field Artillery
- Lieutenant Ezra William Savage, 3rd A.T. Company, Canadian Engineers
- Captain Harry Wilson Scruton, Western Ontario Regiment, Canadian Infantry
- Lieutenant Cecil Randolph Sircom, Canadian Field Artillery, attd. E. Battery, Canadian A.A. Battery
- Captain Stanley Morse Smith, 4th Canadian Division, Signal Company, Canadian Engineers
- Captain Ernest Arthur Steer, 4th Battalion, Canadian Mounted Rifles
- Captain Ronald Douglas Sutherland, Headquarters, 4th Brigade, Canadian Engineers
- Lieutenant Nigel Drury Theobald, 7th Battalion, Canadian Infantry
- Captain Reginald Jabez Vickers, Canadian Army Veterinary Corps, 2nd Canadian M.V.S.
- Captain Harold Chandos Walcot, 43rd Battalion, Canadian Infantry
- Captain William McLean Walwyn, 102nd Battalion, Canadian Infantry
- Captain Francis Surridge Williams, 1st Tramways Company, Canadian Engineers
- Captain Henry Royal Williams, 116th Battalion, Canadian Infantry

Australian Imperial Force

- Lieutenant Phillip Lewis Aitken, 37th Battalion, Australian Infantry
- Lieutenant Laurence Wendover Barnett, 40th Battalion, Australian Infantry
- Lieutenant Percy Aubrey Bull, 32nd Battalion, Australian Infantry
- Lieutenant Harry James Burnett, 1st Brigade, Australian Field Artillery
- Lieutenant Allan George Macleod Burns, 4th Australian Divisional Signals Company, Australian Engineers
- Quartermaster and Captain Laurence Cadell, 49th Battalion, Australian Infantry
- Captain Eustace James Colliver, 43rd Battalion, Australian Infantry
- Lieutenant Richard Cooper, 2nd Australian Divisional Train, Australian Army Service Corps
- Lieutenant Edward Richard Cox, 2nd Australian Divisional Train, Australian Army Service Corps
- Captain Noel Millar Cuthbert, 2nd Battalion, Australian Infantry
- Lieutenant James Davidson, 10th Battalion, Australian Infantry
- Quartermaster and Captain Geoffrey Egg, 11th Battalion, Australian Infantry
- Captain George Frederick Fitzgerald, 5th Battalion, Australian Machine Gun Corps
- Quartermaster and Captain Edward Freeman, 8th Battalion, Australian Infantry
- Captain Alfred Victor Gallasch, 27th Battalion, Australian Infantry
- Captain Keith Irvine Gill, 1st Battalion, Australian Machine Gun Corps
- Quartermaster and Captain Thomas Robin Hammond, 48th Battalion, Australian Infantry
- Lieutenant Leslie Elliot Harding, 50th Battalion, Australian Infantry
- Lieutenant Geoffrey Koeppen Henderson MM 48th Battalion, Australian Infantry
- Lieutenant Cyril Bruce Hislop, 6th Australian Infantry, Brigade Headquarters
- Lieutenant Paul William Hopkins, 4th Battalion, Australian Machine Gun Corps
- Captain Max Ulrich Hubbe, 1st Australian Pioneer Battalion
- Captain Milton Livingstone Fredericks Jarvie, Australian Prov. Corps
- Captain Clarence Walter Lay, 59th Battalion, Australian Infantry
- Captain Norman John MacKay, Australian Army Medical Corps attd. 55th Battalion, Australian Infantry
- Captain David MacKey, 3rd Battalion, Australian Machine Gun Corps
- Lieutenant James Joseph Malone, Australian Flying Corps
- Captain Allan Neil McLennan, 2nd Battalion, Australian Machine Gun Corps
- Captain Donald McLeod, 12th Battalion, Australian Infantry
- Lieutenant Frederick Brayshaw McWhannell, 57th Battalion, Australian Infantry
- Captain Albert Colin Morris, 3rd Tunneling Company, Australian Engineers
- Lieutenant John Wesley Mott DCM 7th Field Company, Australian Engineers
- Lieutenant David Montague Muir, 8th Battalion, Australian Infantry, attd. 2nd Light Trench Mortar Battery
- Lieutenant Henry Herbert Neaves, 45th Battalion, Australian Infantry
- Lieutenant Roy McRae Pattie, 1st Australian Divisional Artillery Column, Australian Field Artillery
- Lieutenant Thomas Giles Paul, 6th Battalion, Australian Infantry
- Quartermaster and Captain Collison Clapham Pearson, 53rd Battalion, Australian Infantry
- Lieutenant Hugh Frank Pennefather, 56th Battalion, Australian Infantry
- Quartermaster and Captain Edgar Ewart Plucknett, 13th Battalion, Australian Infantry
- Lieutenant George Fox Priestley, 11th Battalion, Australian Infantry
- Captain Douglas Frank Kae, 2nd Battalion, Australian Machine Gun Corps
- Lieutenant Leonard Victor Reid, 13th Australian Light Horse Regiment
- Lieutenant John Bade, 2nd Australian Pioneer Battalion
- Lieutenant Harry Bobbins, 38th Battalion, Australian Infantry
- Captain Septimus Archdale Robertson, 4th Australian Divisional Train, Australian Army Service Corps
- Lieutenant Edwin Charles Rogers, 44th Battalion, Australian Infantry
- Lieutenant Frank Rogerson, 3rd Field Company, Australian Engineers
- Captain Francis Palmer Selleck, 24th Battalion, Australian Infantry
- Captain George Leslie Smith, 2nd Tunneling Company, Australian Engineers
- Lieutenant John Morrison Smith, 2nd Australian Divisional Signals Company, Australian Engineers
- Lieutenant Walter Willoughby Smith, 33rd Battalion, Australian Infantry, attd. 9th Australian Light Trench Mortar Battery
- Lieutenant George Holmes Thornton, 4th Australian Pioneer Battalion
- Lieutenant Theodore Glyn Watkins, 51st Battalion, Australian Infantry
- Captain Nelson Frederick Wellington, 21st Battalion, Australian Infantry
- Lieutenant Lawrence Joseph West, 6th A. Brigade, Australian Field Artillery
- Lieutenant Roland William Wild, 4th Australian Pioneer Battalion
- Captain Owen Beresford Williams, 11th Field Company, Australian Engineers
- Rev. Bicton Clemence Wilson Australian Army Chaplains' Department, attd. 1st Brigade, Australian Imperial Force

New Zealand Force

- Lieutenant Erasmus Baxter, 1st New Zealand Rifle Brigade
- 2nd Lieutenant Arthur William Brown DCM New Zealand Machine Gun Corps
- Captain Robert Henry Daldy, New Zealand Engineers
- Captain Norman Harrison Dempster MS New Zealand Medical Corps, attd. 3rd Battalion, New Zealand Rifle Brigade
- Rev. David Craig Herron, New Zealand Chaplains' Department, attd. 2nd Otago Regiment
- Captain Maurice George Robert Newbould, 1st Field Company, New Zealand Engineers
- Captain Edward Tingey, New Zealand Maori Battalion
- Rev. Charles Walls, New Zealand Chaplains' Department, attd. 2nd Battalion, Wellington Regiment
- Captain Alexander Duncan Shanks Whyte, New Zealand Medical Corps, attd. 2nd Brigade Headquarters, New Zealand Field Artillery

South African Force

- Temp 2nd Lieutenant Francis Jean Van Halsland Duminy, 73rd Siege Battery, Royal Garrison Artillery (South African Horse Artillery)
- Lieutenant George Percy Ingarfield, 1st Battalion, South African Infantry

For distinguished service in connection with Military Operations in Egypt:

- 2nd Lieutenant Edward William Alderson, 2/10th Battalion, Middlesex Regiment
- Lieutenant George Hubert Allanson, Indian Army Reserve of Officers, attd. 2nd Battalion, Gurkha Rifles
- Lieutenant Bryan Archer, 1/5th Battalion, Essex Regiment
- Lieutenant Charles Walter Back, Norfolk Regiment, attd. 1/4th Battalion, Norfolk Regiment
- Lieutenant Thomas James Bailey, Royal Field Artillery, attd. Headquarters, 302nd Brigade
- Temp Lieutenant Albert John Beach, attd. Essex Regiment (1/4th Battalion)
- Lieutenant Edward Brymer Belcher, Indian Army Reserve of Officers
- Lieutenant Philip Manley Bendall, 2/19th Battalion, London Regiment
- Captain Ivan Benton, 314th Siege Battery, Royal Garrison Artillery
- Captain John Herd Beverland Royal Army Medical Corps, attd. 165th Indian combined Field Ambulance
- Temp Captain Wentworth Percival Bewicke, General List, attd. Headquarters, 31st Infantry Brigade
- Captain William Frederick Blacker, 36th Jacobs Horse, Indian Army
- Lieutenant Alexander Edwin Blair, Royal Highlanders, attd. 2nd Battalion
- Lieutenant Gerald Stuart Blake, Royal Field Artillery, attd. 270th Brigade
- Captain Leslie Cecil Blackmore Bowker, 2/14th Battalion, London Regiment, attd. Royal Engineers
- 2nd Lieutenant Herbert Braine, attd. Imperial Camel Corps
- Lieutenant Edward James Stanford Loftus Brooke, 2/4th Battalion, Hampshire Regiment, attd. 233rd Infantry Brigade Headquarters
- Captain Harold Septimus Burn, 436th Field Company, Royal Engineers
- Captain Reginald Alfred Carr-White, 31st Lancers, attd. 9th Hodson's Horse
- Captain Howard Charles Bobert Caudle, Royal Garrison Artillery, attd. 262nd Brigade, Royal Field Artillery
- Lieutenant George Duncan Clarke, Hyderabad Imperial Service Lancers
- Lieutenant Thomas Edwin Clements, Royal Field Artillery, attd. 428th Battery
- Lieutenant Godfrey William Collier, Royal West Surrey Regiment, attd. 2/13th Battalion, London Regiment
- Captain Guy Cooper-Willis, 2/20th Battalion, London Regiment
- Lieutenant Charles Neville Christian Copeman, 2nd Battalion, Leicestershire Regiment
- Temp Lieutenant Neville Mortimer Corke, attd. Royal West Surrey Regiment, Comdg. 160th Trench Mortar Battery
- Lieutenant James Patrick Coyle, 2/21st Battalion, London Regiment
- Lieutenant Frederick Crawford, 2nd Battalion, Royal Irish Fusiliers
- Captain Egerton Tymewell Cripps, Gloucestershire Yeomanry
- Temp Surgeon-Captain Aldington George Curphey, 2nd Battalion, British West Indian Regiment
- Lieutenant John Baymond Danson, 1/4th Battalion, Cheshire Regiment
- Temp Captain Stephen Davies, 14th Army Troops, Royal Engineers
- Captain Lancelot Ernest Dennys, 54th Sikhs, Indian Army
- Lieutenant Isaac Pierre de Villiers, Royal Field Artillery, attd. 68th Brigade
- 2nd Lieutenant John Hunt Dibley, Royal Army Service Corps, attd. Camel Transport Corps
- Lieutenant Gregory Augustine Louis Dunphy, 2/21st Battalion, attd. 2/19th Battalion, London Regiment
- Temp Lieutenant John Newman Ellis, 1st Heavy Artillery Signal Section, Royal Engineers
- Captain William Graham Elphinston, 34th Poona Horse, Indian Army
- Temp Captain Gordon John Cruikshank Ferrier, Royal Army Medical Corps, attd. 129th Indian Combined Field Ambulance
- Lieutenant Kenneth Mills Fraser, Indian Army Reserve of Officers, attd. 3rd Gurkha Rifles
- Lieutenant Thomas Edwin Furze, Indian Army Reserve of Officers, attd. 8th Gurkha Rifles
- Lieutenant Edward Gilholme, 21st Lancers, attd. Gloucestershire Yeomanry
- Temp Lieutenant Henry Claude Goldsmith, Suffolk Regiment, attd. 1/5th Battalion
- Captain William Ernest Goodwin, Royal Field Artillery, attd. B. Battery, 67th Brigade
- Captain Charles Edward Grahame, 1st Battalion, Royal Scots Fusiliers
- Temp Lieutenant Edward Stanley Greenhill, Machine Gun Corps
- Temp Lieutenant Albert Harris, 60th Battalion, Machine Gun Corps
- Captain Leslie Price Harris, Royal Army Medical Corps
- Lieutenant Harold John Hasler, attd. 121st Pioneers, Indian Army
- Captain William Francis Theodore Haultain Royal Army Medical Corps, attd. 29th Lancers, Indian Army
- Temp Lieutenant Roland Henry Hazel, 4th Signal Squadron, Royal Engineers
- Captain Charles Frederic William Burton Homan, 1/4th Battalion, Wiltshire Regiment
- Lieutenant Nicholas Howard Thomas Homer, Indian Army Reserve of Officers, attd. 23rd Sikh Pioneers
- Captain John Walter Hornby, 12th Lancers, attd. 2nd Imperial Camel Corps
- Lieutenant Richard John Jane, Royal Field Artillery, attd. 60th Divisional Artillery Column
- Captain Reginald Douglas Jebb, 4th Battalion, Royal Sussex Regiment
- Lieutenant Herbert Verrier Jones, 1/5th Battalion, Welsh Regiment
- Lieutenant Reginald Trevor Jones, Indian Army Reserve of Officers, attd. No. 3 Company
- Temp Lieutenant Burjorji H. Kamakaka, Indian Medical Service, attd. 1st Battalion, 123rd Outrams Rifles, Indian Army
- 2nd Lieutenant George Phillip Kay, Royal Field Artillery, attd. 406th Battery
- Captain Angus Menzies Kennedy, 8th Gurkha Rifles, Indian Army
- Temp 2nd Lieutenant Duncan Campbell Kerr, General List, attd. Egyptian Labour Corps
- Lieutenant Kenneth Francis Kingwell, Royal Field Artillery, attd. 265th Brigade
- Temp 2nd Lieutenant Alex. Smeath Kirkbride, Egyptian Labour Corps
- 2nd Lieutenant Samuel Howard Knight, Somerset Light Infantry, attd. 1/5th Battalion
- Captain Hubert Samuel Lane, 18th Battalion, London Regiment
- Lieutenant Cecil Arthur Loombe, Royal Field Artillery, attd. 272nd Brigade, Royal Field Artillery
- 2nd Lieutenant Gilbert Vivian Henderson Mansell, Honourable Artillery Company
- Lieutenant Cyril Marwood, 301st Battery, Royal Field Artillery
- Temp Lieutenant John Macgregor, 2nd Battalion, Royal Highlanders
- Lieutenant Walter Adair MacLellan, 264th Brigade, Royal Field Artillery
- Captain Emil Theodor Maier, 1/5th Battalion, Bedfordshire Regiment
- Temp Captain Robert McEwan, 6th Battalion, Royal Irish Fusiliers, attd. 5th Battalion
- Temp Lieutenant Charles Melville Melville, attd. Royal Fusiliers, attd. 1/10th Battalion, London Regiment
- Lieutenant Stanley Thomas Meudham, 484th (E. Anglian) Field Company, Royal Engineers
- Captain Gordon Logan Millar, Scottish Horse Yeomanry and Machine Gun Corps (Cavalry)
- Captain Leonard Milton, 2/4th (London) Field Ambulance, Royal Army Medical Corps
- Lieutenant Roy Vivian Murray, Royal Inniskilling Fusiliers, attd. 10th Battalion, Machine Gun Corps
- Lieutenant Dudley Maurice Newitt, Indian Army Reserve of Officers, attd. 53rd Sikhs, Indian Army
- Lieutenant Stanley Guy Notley, 60th Divisional Artillery Column, Royal Field Artillery
- Captain Thomas Schomberg Paterson, 19th Lancers, Indian Army
- Temp 2nd Lieutenant Edward George Pauley, attd. Middlesex Regiment (2/10th Battalion)
- Lieutenant Archibald Lindsey Pavey, Wiltshire Regiment, attd. n8th Battalion, Hampshire Regiment
- Temp 2nd Lieutenant Hubert Peake, Shropshire Light Infantry, attd. 1/1st Battalion, Herefordshire Regiment
- Captain Victor Cooper Ponsonby, Hertfordshire Yeomanry, attd. XXI. A. Corps Cavalry Regiment
- Lieutenant Francis Geoffrey Walmsley Radcliffe, 8th Brigade, Royal Field Artillery
- Captain Oswald Alfred Radley, 7th Battalion, Cheshire Regiment
- Temp Captain Harry James Rae Royal Army Medical Corps
- Lieutenant Robert Philip Lancaster Ranking, attd. 5th Cavalry, Indian Army
- Quartermaster and Major Norman Reid DCM 1st Battalion, Seaforth Highlanders
- Temp Captain Francis Charles Robbs, Royal Army Medical Corps, attd. 1st Battalion, Royal Irish Regiment
- Temp Lieutenant Donald Herbert Rose, Essex Regiment, attd. 1/6th Battalion
- Captain Alan Saunders, Indian Army Reserve of Officers
- Lieutenant Robert Sawers, 495th (Kent) Field Company, Royal Engineers
- Lieutenant Alastair Graeme Scotland, 36th Sikhs, attd. 51st Sikhs, Indian Army
- Lieutenant Samuel Simpson Seccombe, 1/7th Battalion, Essex Regiment
- Captain Norman Sharp, Ayrshire Yeomanry
- Temp 2nd Lieutenant Stephen John Sheldon, Royal Army Service Corps, attd. Camel Transport Corps
- Lieutenant Francis Lisney Skilton, No. Mtn. Battery, Hong Kong and Singapore Royal Garrison Artillery
- Captain Alfred Bernard Pavey Smith, 2/6th Battalion, London Field Ambulance, Royal Army Medical Corps
- Lieutenant Charles Stephenson, Lincolnshire Yeomanry and Machine Gun Corps (Cavalry)
- Temp Lieutenant William Arthur Strange, 5th Battalion, Royal Irish Fusiliers, attd. 2nd Battalion
- Lieutenant Arthur William Street, 8th Battalion, Hampshire Regiment (T.F.V attd. 75th Battalion, Machine Gun Corps
- Lieutenant Noel Rothwell Taitt, 1/16th Battalion, attd. 1/5th Battalion, Bedfordshire Regiment, attd. 162nd Light Trench Mortar Battery
- Lieutenant Lionel Bruce Taylor, C/303rd Battery, Royal Field Artillery
- Temp Lieutenant Cuthbert Raymond Forster Threlfall, Royal Engineers, attd. 5th Cavalry Divisional Signal Squadron
- Temp Lieutenant Walter Travis, attd. Yorkshire Light Infantry, attd. 1/4th Battalion, Northamptonshire Regiment
- Quartermaster and Captain Christopher Joseph Trollope, 2/16th Battalion, London Regiment
- Lieutenant Charles Henning Turner, 519th Field Company, Royal Engineers
- Quartermaster and Captain Thomas Appleby Tutin, 111th Battalion, London Regiment
- Temp Lieutenant Ronald Whithair Vigers, K.K. Cable Section, Royal Engineers
- Lieutenant Cyril Herbert Walker, 1/5th Battalion, Norfolk Regiment
- Lieutenant Wilfrid Arthur Ward, Lancashire Fusiliers, and 60th Battalion, Machine Gun Corps
- Captain George Bevil Hastings Wheeler, 21st Lancers
- Captain Harold Samuel White, 1/1st (Somerset) Royal Horse Artillery, attd. 1/1st Inverness Royal Horse Artillery
- Lieutenant Howard Belmont White, 4th Battalion, Welsh Regiment
- Lieutenant William Haughton Whittington, 60th Divisional Train, Royal Army Service Corps
- Captain Austin Henry Williams, 38th C. Indian Horse, Indian Army
- Lieutenant Gerald Berkeley Wills, 23rd Battalion, London Regiment
- 2nd Lieutenant James Wylie, 10th Mtn. Battery, Royal Garrison Artillery
- Lieutenant Cyril Jeffries Wood, 5th Battalion, East Kent Regiment, attd. 2/4th Battalion, Royal West Kent Regiment (I.F.)

Canadian Force

- Lieutenant James Roe Cockburn, 2nd Central Ontario Regiment, secd. 7th Field Survey Company, Royal Engineers

Australian Imperial Force

- Captain Colin Anderson, 4th Australian Light Horse Field Ambulance, Australian Army Medical Corps
- Lieutenant Charles Joseph Clifford, 11th Australian Light Horse Regiment
- Captain John Fortescue Grantley Fitzhardinge, Australian Army Medical Corps, attd. 5th Australian Light Horse Regiment
- Captain Henry Hackney, 1st Australian Machine Gun Squadron
- Lieutenant George Alexander Harrison, 4th Field Troop, 2nd Field Squadron, Australian Engineers
- Captain Edward John Howells, D Field Troop, Australian Engineers
- Captain Ernest Homewood James, 1st Australian Armd. Car Battery, Australian Machine Gun Corps
- Captain Ernest Marshall Luxmoore, 9th Australian Light Horse Regiment
- Lieutenant Frederick Matthews, 1st Anzac Camel Battalion, Imperial Camel Corps
- Lieutenant Frank William Nivison, 2nd Australian Machine Gun Squadron, attd. 2nd Australian Light Horse Brigade
- Captain George Charles Page, Australian Army Veterinary Corps, attd. 1st Signal Squadron, Australian Engineers
- Lieutenant Allison Goodlet Dight Walker, 6th Australian Light Horse Regiment

New Zealand Force

- Captain Alexander Cameron. Monteith Finlayson, Auckland Mounted Kit. Regiment
- Lieutenant Sinclair Chapman Reid, Auckland Mounted Rifles Regiment
- Captain Arthur Ernest Timaru Rhodes, Canterbury Mounted Rifles
- Lieutenant Robert Sutherland, Wellington Mounted Rifles Regiment

South African Force

- Captain Thomas Brace, 1st South African Field Artillery Brigade

For services rendered in connection with Military Operations in Italy:

- Lieutenant Cecil James Frederick Abbott, 2nd Battalion, Honourable Artillery Company
- Lieutenant George Wyman Abbott, 1/7th Battalion, Royal Warwickshire Regiment
- Lieutenant Arthur Alleri, 1/7th Battalion, Worcestershire Regiment, attd. 144th Trench Mortar Battery
- Temp Captain Edward Elston Appleyard, General List, formerly Yorkshire Regiment
- Temp Captain Harry Appleyard, 7th Divisional Train, Royal Army Service Corps
- Captain John Brian Wilson Ash, 1/7th Battalion, Royal Warwickshire Regiment
- Lieutenant Thomas William Barratt, 475th (South Midland) Field Company, Royal Engineers
- Temp Captain Frederick Barrett, 8th Battalion, Yorkshire Light Infantry
- Lieutenant Douglas Dollin Bassett, Headquarters, 48th (S.M.) Division, Royal Field Artillery
- Lieutenant Frank Beverley, Royal Garrison Artillery, attd. 19th Heavy Battery
- Lieutenant Francis John Biddulph, Royal Engineers, attd. HQ 68th Infantry Brigade
- Lieutenant Hugh Voce Bradford DCM 137th Siege Battery, Royal Garrison Artillery
- Temp 2nd Lieutenant Albert Sydney Bridgewater, 9th Battalion, Devonshire Regiment
- Temp 2nd Lieutenant Sidney Bryant, Gloucestershire Regiment, attd. 1/5th Battalion
- Company Sergeant Major Edgar Buckingham, 1/4th Battalion, Oxfordshire & Buckinghamshire Light Infantry
- Temp Captain Albert Cyril Holcombe Calvert, 8th Battalion, York & Lancaster Regiment
- Lieutenant John Gordon Campbell, 2nd Battalion, Border Regiment
- 2nd Lieutenant Charles Henry Chaffer, 1/4th Battalion, Gloucestershire Regiment
- Temp Lieutenant Hugh Howard Vivian Christie, Royal Field Artillery
- Temp Captain William Freeman Cooper, 8th Battalion, Devonshire Regiment
- Captain Raymond Kyle Cotter, Royal Field Artillery, attd. 240th Brigade, Royal Field Artillery
- Temp 2nd Lieutenant James Edwin Crooks, 12th Battalion, Durham Light Infantry, attd. 68th Light Trench Mortar Battery
- Captain Geoffrey Fenwick Jocelyn Cumberlege DSO Oxfordshire & Buckinghamshire Light Infantry
- Lieutenant George Frederick Dakin, 4th Battalion, York & Lancaster Regiment, attd. 8th Battalion
- Lieutenant Henry Wallis Dixon, Royal Garrison Artillery, attd. 317th Siege Battery
- Lieutenant William Edward Pears Done, 5th Battalion, Royal Sussex Regiment
- Lieutenant Alec Neville Downing, 1/6th Battalion, Royal Warwickshire Regiment
- Temp Lieutenant Gerald Jerome Eastburn, General List
- 2nd Lieutenant Hugh Cecil Allen Edwards, 2nd Battalion, Royal Warwickshire Regiment
- Temp 2nd Lieutenant Thomas Harkness Galbraith, Royal Engineers, attd. Field Survey Company
- Temp 2nd Lieutenant Harry Stephen Gawler, 9th Battalion, York & Lancaster Regiment
- Lieutenant Leonard Albert Gibbs, 6th Battalion, Devonshire Regiment, attd. 9th Battalion
- Captain Bernard Glasson, Royal Garrison Artillery, attd. 28th, now 391st, Siege Battery
- 2nd Lieutenant Leonard Tom Goodenough, 1/4th Battalion, Royal Berkshire Regiment
- Captain William Gordon, 2nd Battalion, Gordon Highlanders
- Temp Captain Arthur Ethelbert Griffin, 101st Field Company, Royal Engineers
- Temp 2nd Lieutenant John Frederick Guttridge, 9th Battalion, Yorkshire Regiment
- Lieutenant John Baieley Hales, 1st Buckinghamshire Battalion, Oxfordshire & Buckinghamshire Light Infantry
- Quartermaster and Captain Charles Harding, 1/8th Battalion, Royal Warwickshire Regiment
- Captain Samuel Stuart Harris, 1/6th Battalion, Gloucestershire Regiment, attd. 145th Trench Mortar Battery
- Temp 2nd Lieutenant John Thomas Harrison, attd. South Staffordshire Regiment (1st Battalion)
- Lieutenant Reginald Heather, 2nd Battalion, Honourable Artillery Company
- Temp 2nd Lieutenant James Hedley, 23rd Battalion, Machine Gun Corps
- Temp 2nd Lieutenant John Herrington, 9th Battalion, South Staffordshire Regiment
- Temp Captain Frank Wilson Hird, 10th Battalion, Northumberland Fusiliers
- Lieutenant Horatio Francis Horton, 5th Battalion, Suffolk Regiment, attd. 11th Battalion, West Yorkshire Regiment
- Temp Captain Adderley Fitzalan Bernard Howard, 13th Battalion, Durham Light Infantry
- Rev. Thomas Joseph James, Royal Army Chaplains' Department, attd. 70th Infantry Brigade
- Temp Lieutenant Thomas King, 54th Field Company, Royal Engineers
- Lieutenant Frank Robson Kirkley, Royal Field Artillery, attd. 102nd Brigade
- Lieutenant Ralph Smith Leake, 1/7th Battalion, Worcestershire Regiment
- Temp 2nd Lieutenant Albert George Lewis, D Battery, 103rd Brigade, Royal Field Artillery
- Lieutenant Eric Carl Lightbody, 477th (South Midland) Field Company, Royal Engineers
- Captain Kenneth Morley Loch, V A.A. Battery, Royal Field Artillery
- Lieutenant James Edward Mackay, 1/4th Battalion, Oxfordshire & Buckinghamshire Light Infantry
- Temp Captain Alexander Hepburn Macklin Royal Army Medical Corps, attd. 11th Battalion, West Yorkshire Regiment
- Temp Lieutenant Donald Edward May, attd. Royal Welsh Fusiliers (1st Battalion)
- Temp 2nd Lieutenant Norman Millar, 8th Battalion, Yorkshire Regiment
- 2nd Lieutenant Cyril Llewellyn Morris, 1/6th Battalion, Gloucestershire Regiment
- Temp Lieutenant Russell Williams Newcomb, Signal Company, Royal Engineers, General Headquarters
- Quartermaster and Captain Edward Nichol, Buckinghamshire Battalion, Oxfordshire & Buckinghamshire Light Infantry
- Rev. Hubert Noke, Royal Army Chaplains' Department
- Temp 2nd Lieutenant John Harrill Pearse, 9th Battalion, York & Lancaster Regiment
- Captain William Noel Pharazyn, 35th Brigade, Royal Field Artillery
- Captain Lionel George Pilkington, 3rd Battalion, Royal Warwickshire Regiment
- Lieutenant Leonard Cecil Plews, Gordon Highlanders, attd. 2nd Battalion
- Lieutenant Eustace John Priddey, Yorkshire Light Infantry, attd. 8th Battalion
- Captain Geoffry Swabery Ridout, 7th Divisional Signal Company, Royal Engineers
- Temp 2nd Lieutenant William Arthur Sharpe, 9th Battalion, Yorkshire Regiment
- Temp 2nd Lieutenant Frederick Harry Skiller, 23rd Battalion, Machine Gun Corps
- Temp Lieutenant Allan Chalmers Smith, Royal Field Artillery
- Temp 2nd Lieutenant Thomas Smithson, 12th Battalion, Durham Light Infantry
- Lieutenant Edmund Osborn Springfield, Norfolk Regiment, sec. to 7th Battalion, Machine Gun Corps
- Captain Harry Stead, 102nd Brigade, Royal Field Artillery
- Temp 2nd Lieutenant George Clifford Sugden, 10th Battalion, West Riding Regiment
- Temp Captain Angus Taylor, 285th A.T. Company, Royal Engineers
- 2nd Lieutenant John Charles Deans Taylor, Royal Garrison Artillery, attd. 247th Siege Battery, Royal Garrison Artillery
- Lieutenant Eric Westbury Thompstone, Shropshire Light Infantry, attd. 1/4th Battalion, Gloucestershire Regiment
- Temp 2nd Lieutenant James Thomas Walley, 20th Battalion, Manchester Regiment
- Temp 2nd Lieutenant John William Wilkinson, 8th Battalion, Yorkshire Regiment
- Lieutenant Charles Skinner Wilson, Royal Field Artillery, attd. Headquarters, 102nd Brigade, Royal Field Artillery
- Temp Lieutenant Neil Young Wilson, 11th Battalion, Northumberland Fusiliers, late 8th Battalion, North Staffordshire Regiment

For valuable services rendered in connection with Military Operations in Salonika:

- Lieutenant Charles Addy, Royal Field Artillery
- Temp Captain William Anderson, Royal Garrison Artillery
- Lieutenant Edgar Andrew, 2nd Battalion, Cheshire Regiment
- Lieutenant George William Arney, 2nd Battalion, East Lancashire Regiment
- Lieutenant William Barnes Austin, Royal Garrison Artillery (S.E.)
- Temp Captain John Dunstan Bavin, Royal Field Artillery
- Lieutenant William Gordon Bayly, East Lancashire Regiment (S.B.), attd. 2nd Battalion
- Lieutenant Herbert Dacre Beadon, Yorkshire Regiment, attd. 2nd Battalion, Shropshire Light Infantry
- Lieutenant James Brindley Bettington, Shropshire Light Infantry, attd. 8th Battalion
- Temp Captain Frank Robert Bloor MBE Royal Army Ordnance Corps
- Temp Captain Chandos Eric Bone, Royal Field Artillery
- Temp Captain Joseph Reginald Braddick, Royal Field Artillery
- Captain Roderic Duncan Cameron Royal Army Medical Corps (S.E.)
- Temp Captain Geoffrey Carr, 8th Battalion, Shropshire Light Infantry
- Temp 2nd Lieutenant John Bomany Rhys Challen, attd. Middlesex Regiment, 26th Battalion
- Captain Campbell Manning Christie, Royal Garrison Artillery
- Lieutenant William Gibson Cochrane, Royal Scots (S.E.), attd. 1st Battalion
- Captain Mervyn Clement Cooper, Royal Army Medical Corps (S.E.)
- Lieutenant Arthur John Moore Cooney, Royal Artillery
- Temp Lieutenant Kenneth Fursdon Crang, attd. Duke of Cornwall's Light Infantry
- Lieutenant Richard Bagnall Crawford, Pembroke Yeomanry, attd. 1st Battalion, Welsh Regiment
- Temp Lieutenant Cedric Branscombe Davidson, Machine Gun Corps
- Temp Captain Hilary Arthur Lancelot Donkin, 7th Battalion, Royal Berkshire Regiment
- Temp Captain Charles Maitland Duncan, Royal Field Artillery
- Lieutenant Thomas Dunn, 2/7th Battalion, Durham Light Infantry (T.F.), attd. Machine Gun Corps
- Captain Walter Manoel Edwards, Royal Garrison Artillery
- Captain Geoffrey Bede Egerton, Royal Army Medical Corps (S.E.)
- Lieutenant Hugh Francis Bradshaw Garrett, E. Surr. R. and Machine Gun Corps
- Captain Arthur Alexander Gemmell, 2nd Battalion, Cameron Highlanders
- Lieutenant Nigel Manghan Gordon, 1st Battalion, Suffolk Regiment
- Lieutenant Maurice John Griffith, Royal Field Artillery
- Temp 2nd Lieutenant Thomas Bain Gunn, 2nd Battalion, Cheshire Regiment
- Lieutenant Ernest Lynn Hill DCM Royal Inniskilling Fusiliers
- Lieutenant Percy Albion Hitchcock, Royal Engineers
- Lieutenant Arthur Edward Hewitt, Royal Garrison Artillery
- Temp Captain George Bedingfield Holroyde, Royal Army Medical Corps
- Temp Lieutenant Stanley Robertson Ince, Machine Gun Corps, attd. 2nd Garrison Battalion, Liverpool Regiment
- Temp Lieutenant George Frederick Jackson, Royal Garrison Artillery
- Lieutenant Charles Henry Kinnaird, Welsh Regiment
- Lieutenant Alexander Bannatyne Stewart Laidlaw, Royal Engineers
- Temp Captain Merlin Gordon Lubbock, Royal Field Artillery
- Temp Lieutenant George Frederick Lowen, 10th Battalion, Royal Highlanders
- Temp Captain Ernest Frederick Lyons, 10th Battalion, Devonshire Regiment
- Lieutenant Henry Cuthbert Erroll Mauduit, 3rd Battalion, King's Royal Rifle Corps
- Captain William Mackintosh, Lovat's Scouts Yeomanry, attd. 10th Battalion Cameron Highlanders
- Temp Lieutenant Douglas Bruce Merrie, 7th Battalion, Oxfordshire & Buckinghamshire Light Infantry
- Temp Captain William George Moore, Royal Garrison Artillery
- Temp Captain Frank William Morgan, Royal Field Artillery
- Captain Fred George Morgan, 1st Battalion, York & Lancaster Regiment
- Captain Thomas Silvian Morris, Rifle Brigade, attd. Machine Gun Corps
- Sergeant Major Rowland Ernest Neville, 7th Battalion, Royal Berkshire Regiment
- Captain Douglas Howard Nicholson, 1st Battalion, Royal Scots
- Lieutenant Montagu Horatio Nelson Aubrey Noble, Royal Highlanders, attd. 10th Battalion
- Captain William James Norman, Royal Engineers
- Temp Lieutenant John Stephens Oldham, East Lancashire Regiment, attd. 9th Battalion
- Temp Captain William Alfred Pickard, 11th Battalion, Royal Welsh Fusiliers
- Rev. Jeremiah Pigott, Royal Army Chaplains' Department
- Lieutenant John William Pitt, Royal Field Artillery
- Rev. Thomas Ceredig Phillips, Royal Army Chaplains' Department
- Temp Lieutenant Harold Kemp Prossor, 2nd Battalion, Gloucestershire Regiment, attd. Trench Mortar Battery
- Rev. William Loyd Musgrave Protheroe Royal Army Chaplains' Department
- Lieutenant William Robert Reeve, 3/6th Battalion, East Surrey Regiment (T.F), attd. 2nd Battalion
- Rev. Charles Robertson, Royal Army Chaplains' Department
- Captain Cecil Bruce Robertson, 1st Battalion, Argyll and Sutherland Highlanders
- Temp Captain Wallace Roderick Duncan Robertson, Royal Field Artillery
- Temp Captain Osborne Victor Maude Roxby, General List
- Lieutenant Michael Charles Stanley Sadler, 1/1st Derby Yeomanry
- Lieutenant John Dee Shapland, Royal Garrison Artillery
- Captain Leonard James Sheil Royal Army Medical Corps
- Lieutenant Clive Smith, 2nd Battalion, Northumberland Fusiliers
- Temp Lieutenant Ian Sugden Smith, attd. Royal Scots Fusiliers, 8th Battalion
- Temp Captain Millie Don Stott, 9th Battalion, Border Regiment
- Temp 2nd Lieutenant Eric Mansfield Stuart, 12th Battalion, Cheshire Regiment
- Temp Lieutenant Alastair Theodore Whitmarsh Stukeley, 7th Battalion, Oxfordshire & Buckinghamshire Light Infantry
- Lieutenant Clive Errington Temperley, 4th Battalion, Rifle Brigade
- 2nd Lieutenant Arthur Edward Thompson, Royal Garrison Artillery
- 2nd Lieutenant William Todd, Royal Field Artillery
- 2nd Lieutenant John Tomlin, 6th Battalion, Nottinghamshire and Derbyshire Regiment, attd. 11th Battalion, Scottish Rifles
- Captain Herbert Watt Torrance Royal Army Medical Corps
- Temp Lieutenant Stanley Neville Ure, Machine Gun Corps
- Temp Lieutenant Arthur Cyril Waterfield, 8th Battalion, Shropshire Light Infantry, attd. 66th Trench Mortar Battery
- Temp Captain Hubert Leslie Westlake, 7th Battalion, Wiltshire Regiment
- Lieutenant John Virtue Whitelaw, Royal Field Artillery, attd. Royal Garrison Artillery
- Temp Lieutenant William John Williams, 1st Battalion, Welsh Regiment
- Captain Leonard Henry Wootton Royal Army Medical Corps

For distinguished service in connection with Military Operations in North Russia

- 2nd Lieutenant Ernest W. Michelson, Special List

=== Awarded a Bar to the Military Cross (MC*) ===
- Lieutenant Percy Bayliss MC attd. 16th Battalion, Royal Scots
- Lieutenant John Burgon Bickersteth MC Royal Dragoons
- Temp Captain James Biggam MC Royal Army Medical Corps
- Captain Edwin John Bradley MC Royal Army Medical Corps, attd. 1/3rd (N. Mid) Field Ambulance
- Temp Captain Frank Leslie Brown MC 17th Battalion, King's Royal Rifle Corps, attd. Headquarters, 117th Infantry Brigade
- Rev. Father John O'Reordan Browne MC Royal Army Chaplains' Department, attd. 2/4th Battalion, North Lancashire Regiment
- Temp Lieutenant William Burns MC 18th Battalion Machine Gun Corps
- Lieutenant Mathew Carr MC formerly Royal Scots Fusiliers, attd. 102nd Infantry Brigade
- Captain Harold Vincent Spencer Charrington MC 12th Lancers
- 2nd Lieutenant Cyril Wardlaw Distin MC attd. 28th Brigade
- Captain Henry Charles Hamilton Eden MC Royal Field Artillery, formerly Royal Artillery, Headquarters, 59th Division
- Temp Quartermaster and Lieutenant Reginald Isaac Fairfax MC 10th Battalion, Cheshire Regiment
- Temp Captain Thomas Raleigh Gibbs MC 2nd Battalion, Highland Light Infantry
- Temp Captain Ronald Owen Hall MC General List
- Temp 2nd Lieutenant James Montgomery Hamilton MC 10th Battalion, Lancashire Fusiliers
- Captain John David Hills MC 1/5th Battalion, Leicestershire Regiment
- Lieutenant William Thomas O'Reilly MC Middlesex Regiment, attd. 2nd Battalion, Hampshire Regiment
- 2nd Lieutenant Elton Walter Pickles MC 8th Battalion, Worcestershire Regiment T.F., attd. 3rd Battalion
- Lieutenant Walter Rhind MC 409th Field Company, Royal Engineers
- Captain Frederick Joseph Rice MC C/82nd Brigade, Royal Field Artillery
- Temp Lieutenant Gleeson Edward Robinson MC Royal Field Artillery, attd. 17th Division, Trench Mortar Battery
- 2nd Lieutenant Stanley Flemyng Sanders MC Royal Garrison Artillery, attd. 139th S. Battery
- Temp Captain Edward Owen Sewell MC General List
- Lieutenant William Henry Tamlyn MC 504th (Wessex) Field Company, Royal Engineers
- 2nd Lieutenant Denys Redward Vachell MC 12th Field Company, Royal Engineers
- Lieutenant Thomas Dewar Weldon MC Royal Field Artillery, attd. Headquarters 45th Brigade
- Temp Lieutenant Edward Augustus Wheatley MC 3rd Field Sqdn, Royal Engineers
- Temp Captain William Uttamare White MC Royal Garrison Artillery, attd. 87th S. Battery
- Lieutenant Arthur Wingate Wingate MC 1st Dragoons

Canadian Force

- Captain Edwin Day MC 5th Battalion, Canadian Infantry
- Temp Captain James Nisbet Edgar MC Princess Patricia's Canadian Light Infantry
- Lieutenant James Cowan Franklin MC Canadian Corps, HQ Signal Company, Canadian Engineers
- Lieutenant William Francis McGovern MC 13th Battalion, Canadian Infantry
- Lieutenant Thomas Burnham Woodyatt MC 58th Battalion, Canadian Infantry

Australian Imperial Force

- Lieutenant Maurice Alfred Fergusson MC 10th Brigade, Australian Field Artillery
- Captain William Dane Wallis MC Headquarters, 5th Australian Divisional Artillery

South African Force

- Temp Captain Edward Gordelier Ridley MC 74th S. Battery, Royal Garrison Artillery (South African Horse Artillery)

For services rendered in connection with Military Operations in Italy:

- Lieutenant Neal William Matheson MC Royal Engineers
- Lieutenant Francis Dudley Rugman MC 1/6th Battalion, Gloucestershire Regiment
- Temp 2nd Lieutenant Edward Kent Waite MC 10th Battalion, West Riding Regiment

For valuable services rendered in connection with Military Operations in Salonika:

- Lieutenant Patrick John Tottenham Pickthall MC Royal Garrison Artillery

=== Awarded a Second Bar to the Military Cross (MC**) ===
- Temp Captain Ronald Rawson Rawson MC* 19th Divisional Signal Company, Royal Engineers
- Captain Hugh Kingsley Ward MC* Royal Army Medical Corps, attd. 2nd Battalion, King's Royal Rifle Corps

== Distinguished Flying Cross (DFC) ==
- Lieutenant William Melville Ackery
- Lieutenant Allan Percy Adams
- Lieutenant Douglas Alliban
- Lieutenant Thomas Craig Annan
- Major Anthony Rex Arnold DSC
- Lieutenant Edward Enos Arnold
- Major Frederick Cecil Baker AFC
- Lieutenant Leonard William Baker
- Captain Sidney Ernest Ball
- Captain David Moar Ballantyne
- Lieutenant Albert Frederick Bartlett
- Lieutenant Frederick Gordon Bayley
- Captain Rene Maurice Bayley
- Lieutenant James Alexander Beeney
- Lieutenant Bernard John Everest Belcher
- Lieutenant William Bentley
- Captain George William Biles
- Acting Captain Thomas Gerald Glyn Bolitho MC
- Lieutenant Ralph Bolton
- Lieutenant James Boyd
- Lieutenant Neville Isaac Brockbank
- Lieutenant Reginald Frederick Browne
- Lieutenant William Edward Bryan
- Lieutenant Wilfred James Buchanan
- Lieutenant-Colonel Henry Meyrick Cave-Browne-Cave DSO
- Lieutenant Sydney James Chamberlain
- Captain Cecil John Clayton
- Lieutenant Lionel John Collier
- Lieutenant Herbert Melbourne Coombs
- Captain Ebenezer Bertram Cowell
- Captain Rupert Edward Darnton
- Lieutenant Robert Ernest Lloyd Davies
- Lieutenant Harold George Davis
- Major Charles Herbert Dixon MC
- Captain Kenneth Town Dowding
- Lieutenant John Ellingham
- Lieutenant Sidney Samuel Flook
- Captain Wilfred Forsyth Norman Forrest
- Lieutenant Leslie Robert Fox
- Lieutenant Eric John Furlong
- Lieutenant Arthur Stuart Girling
- Lieutenant Thomas Crowther Gordon
- Lieutenant Acheson Gosford Goulding MC Canadian Local Forces
- Captain Ronald Grahame DSO DSC
- Lieutenant Charles Bremner Green, Canadian Local Forces
- Lieutenant James Duff Guild
- Captain Francis Neville Halstead
- Lieutenant Earl McNabb Hand
- 2nd Lieutenant Frederick Joseph Haney MC
- Captain Henry Ivan Hanmer
- Lieutenant Norman Roy Harben
- Captain Edmund Parfitt Hardman
- 2nd Lieutenant George Henry Alexander Hart
- Lieutenant Peter Haworth
- Lieutenant Harold Hillier
- Captain Walter George Raymond Hinchliffe
- Lieutenant John Hodgson
- Lieutenant George William Holderness
- Lieutenant John Richard Hopkins
- Lieutenant Francis Thomas Rattray Kempster
- Captain Walter Robert Kenny
- Lieutenant Leslie Lindo King
- Lieutenant George Martin Lees MC
- Lieutenant Douglas Fairlie Lepraik
- Captain Reginald Frederick Stuart Leslie DSC
- Lieutenant Isaac Wyper Leiper
- Lieutenant George Alexander Lingham
- 2nd Lieutenant James Macdonald (No. 6 Group, Adriatic)
- Lieutenant Malcolm MacEwan
- Major Charles Joseph Mackay MC
- 2nd Lieutenant Dugald MacDougall
- Lieutenant Earle Fraser McIlraith
- Lieutenant Frank Melville McLellan
- Captain Philip Herbert Mackworth
- Lieutenant Harvey Lancelot Macro
- Captain Bertram Alexander Malet
- Lieutenant John Leonard Mayer
- 2nd Lieutenant William Miller
- Lieutenant David Fraser Murray
- Lieutenant Jaffrey John Walter Nicholson
- Captain Harry Lawrence Nunn DSC
- 2nd Lieutenant Osborne John Orr
- 2nd Lieutenant Augustus Paget
- Lieutenant Frederick William Pickup
- 2nd Lieutenant Colin Patrick Primrose
- Lieutenant-Colonel William Harold Primrose
- Major John Charles Quinnell
- Lieutenant Walter Ridley, Canadian Engineers
- Lieutenant-Colonel Edmund Digby Maxwell Robertson
- Lieutenant Frederick Vernon Robinson (Canadian M.R.)
- 2nd Lieutenant Ian Robert Lawther Ross
- Lieutenant George Henry Russell
- Captain William Leopold Samson
- Lieutenant Frederick Herbert St. Clair Sargant
- Major Richard Ernest Saul
- Captain Charles Winter Scott
- Captain Robert Henry Sharp
- Lieutenant Victor Donald Siddons
- Captain Ronald Davidson Simpson
- Captain Leonard Horatio Slatter DSC
- Major Bernard Edward Smythies
- Lieutenant Robert Geddes Spence
- 2nd Lieutenant James Humphrey Sprott
- 2nd Lieutenant Henry McDermott Starke
- Captain Claude Harry Stokes
- Lieutenant Edwin Curtis Robinson Stoneman
- Lieutenant Stephen Charles Strafford
- Lieutenant Hedworth Williamson Tait
- Captain Godfrey Maine Thomas
- Lieutenant William Miles Thomas
- Lieutenant Thomas William Gordon Thompson
- Captain Thomas George Thornton MC
- 2nd Lieutenant Geoffrey Beauchamp Treadwell
- Lieutenant Frederick Culborne Vincent
- Lieutenant Charles Frederick Allan Wagstaff
- Captain Henry James Wiser, Canadian Infantry
- Captain John Arthur Yonge

=== Awarded a Bar to the Distinguished Flying Cross (DFC*) ===
- Captain Keith Logan Caldwell MC DFC
- Lieutenant Robert Halley DFC
- Lieutenant Thomas Walter Nash DFC

== Distinguished Flying Medal (DFM) ==
In recognition of valuable services rendered with the British Forces in Italy:

- Sergeant Mechanic Samuel Eli Allatson (Southend-on-Sea)
- Sergeant Mechanic Robert Allen (Fochabers)
- Sergeant Mechanic Cecil George Tennyson Bishop (Wimbledon)
- Corporal Mechanic Richard Brock (Ontario, Can.)
- Sergeant Mechanic Edwin Charles Carpenter (King's Lynn)
- Sergeant Mechanic Romald Charles-Chapman (Manor Park, London)
- Sergeant Mechanic Charles William Cooke, East Lancashire Regiment, attd. Royal Air Force
- Air Mechanic, 2nd Class William Edwards (Boston, Spa)
- Air Mechanic, 3rd Class William Kimberley Foster (West Hampstead, London)
- Sergeant Edward Hoare (Acton Vale)
- Sergeant Mechanic Trevor Hooton (Cardiff)
- Sergeant Mechanic William Henry Hoskin (Fulham, London)
- Air Mechanic, 2nd Class William Owen Hughes (Anglesey)
- Air Mechanic, 3rd Class Arthur Stanley Jones (Levenshulme)
- Sergeant Mechanic George Stanley Keen (High Wycombe)
- Air Mechanic, 1st Class Charles William Lamb (Wolverhampton)
- Air Mechanic, 3rd Class Alexander Lindsay (Milngavie)
- Sergeant Mechanic Ernest George-Maund (Ilford)
- Sergeant Mechanic John Henry Matthews (Cardiff)
- Air Mechanic, 1st Class Reginald Arthur Miller (Balham, London)
- Sergeant Meah. Malcolm Frederick George Mill (Poplar)
- Sergeant Mechanic Ewart Oswald Norris (Cheltenham)
- Sergeant Mechanic Peroival George Phillips (East Ham)
- Sergeant Mechanic Christopher James-Shannon (Stamford Hill, London)
- Sergeant Mechanic Eric Gordon Stevens, Lancashire Fusiliers, attd. Royal Air Force)
- Corporal Clerk Frank Frederick Thomas (Sandown, Isle of Wight)
- Sergeant Mechanic Frank Leslie Clive-Thornton (Blandford)
- Corporal Mechanic Alfred Edward Tucker (Watford)
- Corporal Frederick Thomas Wallacefanning Town, London)
- Sergeant Mechanic William Edward David Wardrop (Fulham)
- Sergeant Mechanic Victor Gordon Warnock (Kidderminster)

== Air Force Cross (AFC) ==
- Major Leslie Peech Aizlewood MC
- Captain Ellis Anthony, Canadian Militia
- Captain William Henry Shields Aplin
- Lieutenant George Hughes Armstrong
- Captain Edward Dawson Atkinson DFC
- Captain Joseph Dover Atkinson
- Captain Ernest Arthur Oliphant Auldjo-Jamieson
- Major Philip Babington MC
- 2nd Lieutenant William Dodds Haldane Baird
- Captain Brian Edward Baker DSO MC
- Lieutenant Edward Gentleman Bannister
- Lieutenant Frank Bell Baragar
- Captain Frank Sowter Barnwell OBE
- Captain Stanley Bell
- Captain Vivian Arthur Fenton Bellamy
- Captain Seymour Stewart Benson
- 2nd Lieutenant Archer Ormonde Binding
- Lieutenant Joseph Wesley Lightbourne Birkbeck
- Captain Alfred Montague Blake
- Captain Alfred Gordon Bond
- Lieutenant The Honourable Alan Reginald Boyle (Balloon Section)
- Lieutenant Allan Boyle MC
- Captain Norman Brearley DSO MC
- Lieutenant Godfrey Bremridge
- Lieutenant Bertie Sandel Brice
- Colonel Henry Robert Moore Brooke-Popham DSO
- 2nd Lieutenant Richard John Brotherton, South African Forces
- 2nd Lieutenant Leonard Desborough Brown
- Captain Henry John Butler
- Lieutenant-Colonel Henry Richard Busteed OBE
- Lieutenant David Vaughan Carnegie
- Lieutenant Reginald Sheridan Carroll
- Lieutenant Morris Drinkwater Carver
- Lieutenant Paul Richard Tankerville Chamberlayne
- Major Robert Arthur Chalmers OBE
- Lieutenant Douglas Alwyn Rougier Chapman
- Lieutenant Victor Charles Chapman
- Lieutenant Henry Richard Clarke
- Captain Frank Cleary
- Captain John Alexander Coats
- Captain Ralph Alexander Cochrane
- Major The Honourable Roger Coke
- Captain John Patrick Coleman
- Major Arthur Quilton Cooper DSC
- Captain Alexander Robb Cox
- Captain Arthur George Davis
- Captain Ronald Eric Dean
- Lieutenant Desmond Herlooin de Burgh
- Captain Geoffrey de Havilland OBE
- Lieutenant Émile Henri de Heaume
- Captain Hedley Vicars Drew
- Lieutenant Charles Herbert Drew
- Lieutenant Reginald Threlkeld Edwards
- Captain Thomas Walker Elmhirst
- Lieutenant Sven Eric Faber
- Captain Charles Osborn Fairbairn
- Captain Joseph Stewart Temple Fall DSC
- Lieutenant-Colonel Charles Robert Finch-Noyes DSO
- Lieutenant-Colonel John Norman Fletcher
- Lieutenant Norman Graham Fraser
- Lieutenant Edward David George Galley MC
- Lieutenant Harold Fraser Game
- Lieutenant Gerald William Gathergood
- Captain Alfred Herbert Harold Gilligan
- Captain Albert Earl Godfrey MC
- Lieutenant John Henry Gotch
- Major Douglas Harries
- Major Irving Henry Bibby Hartford
- Captain Charles Samuel Hay
- Lieutenant Stephen Hay
- Captain Harold Hemming
- Major Swithin Gane Hodges MC
- Captain Walter Thomas Forrest Holland
- Major Ralph James Jean Hope-Vere
- Lieutenant Frank Lindon Hopps
- Lieutenant John Leitch Home
- Major Thomas O'Brien Hubbard MC
- Lieutenant Frederick Irwin Jacks
- Lieutenant Clarence Jackson
- Captain Douglas Grahame Joy, Canadian M.R.
- Captain John Harvey Keens
- Captain Harold Spencer Kerby
- Lieutenant Ralph Imray Barton
- Captain Edwin Middleton Knott
- 2nd Lieutenant Charles Victor Lacey
- Lieutenant Thomas Audley Langford-Sainsbury
- Lieutenant Eardley Haydon Lawford
- Captain John Owen Leach MC
- Captain Thomas Orde Hans Lees
- Captain Ivo Cecil Little
- Colonel Charles Alexander Hoicombe Longcroft DSO
- Captain Ernest Vincent Longinotto
- Captain Geoffrey Lyttleton Lowis
- Captain James Steel Maitland
- Lieutenant-Colonel Francis Kennedy McClean
- Captain Cedric Yeats McDonald
- Captain Ian Macdonald
- Lieutenant Ivor Ewing McIntyre
- Captain William Gordon McMinnies
- Lieutenant Theodore Marburg
- Captain Peter Henry Martin
- Captain Thomas John Clement Martyn MC
- Lieutenant James Arthur Ryerson Mason
- Colonel Edward Alexander Dimsdale Masterman CBE
- 2nd Lieutenant Thomas Frederick Mathewson
- Captain Edward Morgan Morgan
- Lieutenant Cyrus Maxwell Mortimer
- 2nd Lieutenant John Morton
- Major Eric Roper Curzon Nanson DSC
- Lieutenant William Eric Nicholson
- Major Sidney Ernest Parker MBE
- Captain Cyril Patteson MC
- Lieutenant-Colonel Richard Edmund Charles Peirse DSO
- Lieutenant George Beacoll Powell
- 2nd Lieutenant Arthur Gwynne Power
- Lieutenant Raphael Chevallier Preston
- Major Conway Walter Heath Pulford
- Captain William Ronald Read MC
- Lieutenant Leo James Riordan
- Captain Hugh Anselm Boulton Robb MC
- Captain Brian Kyte David Robertson
- Lieutenant Douglas Hall Robertson
- Captain William Roche-Kelly
- Lieutenant-Colonel Charles Rumney Samson DSO
- Captain Robert Henry Magnus Spencer Saundby MC
- Lieutenant-Colonel Alan John Lance Scott MC
- Major George Herbert Scott
- Major James Stanley Scott MC
- Captain Walter Somerville Scott MC
- Lieutenant James Orrok Simpson
- Lieutenant Malcolm Millard Sisley
- Lieutenant Harry Slingsby
- Lieutenant Bernard Valentine Seymour Smith MC
- Lieutenant Gerald Dent Smith
- Captain Percy William Snell
- Major Frederick Sowrey DSO MC
- Major William Sowrey
- Captain Arthur Sparrow
- 2nd Lieutenant Cowan Douglas Stephenson
- Lieutenant John Clifford Stockman
- Captain Charles Howe Stocks
- Captain Ronald Scott Sugden
- Captain John A. Sully, Alberta Regiment
- Lieutenant Edric Tasker
- Major George Stanley Trewin
- Captain Cyril Jameson Truran
- Captain George Mark Turnbull
- Captain Harley Alec Tweedie
- Lieutenant Harold Ridlington Hunter Ward
- Captain Seigfried Ricards Watkins
- Lieutenant Francis Vivian Way
- Lieutenant Robert Marychurch Whitmore
- Captain Lloyd Whitworth
- Captain Percival Wickens
- Captain James Norris Wilson
- Major John Philip Wilson DSC
- Captain Bernard Cyril Windeler
- Lieutenant Ambrose Oliver Keeton Wright
- Lieutenant James Alfred Snarey Wright
- Captain William Alan Wright
- Lieutenant Arthur Mostyn Wray MC
- Lieutenant Harold Clare Young, Canadian Machine Gun Corps

== Air Force Medal (AFM) ==
In recognition of valuable services rendered with the British Forces in Italy:

- Corporal Mechanic Elmo Bearden (Brooklyn)
- Air Mechanic, 2nd Class William Herbert Brown (Croydon)
- Chief Mechanic Arthur Ernest Close (Glasgow)
- Mechanist Sergeant Sidney Redvers-Cole (Chesham, Bedfordshire)
- Chief Mechanic Cecil Jebson Cox (York)
- Air Mechanic, 1st Class Harold Frank Crespin (Felixstowe)
- Chief Mechanic Albert Edward Easterbrook (Portsmouth)
- Chief Mechanic George William Hunt (Peterhead)
- Chief Mechanic John William Long (Gosport)
- Chief Mechanic Hubert Wilfred Newitt (Goodmayes)
- Sergeant Mechanic William Fred Paull (Bitton, Gloucs.)
- Corporal Mechanic James Moran Quailr D.S.M. (Cloratarf, Dublin)
- Sergeant Mechanic Walter Rogers (Vauxhall)
- Air Mechanic, 1st Class Stephen Leonard Starr (Richmond, Surrey)

== Military Medal (MM) ==
- Chief Master-Mechanic Laurence Grant Miles (Harlesden)

== King's Police Medal (KPM) ==
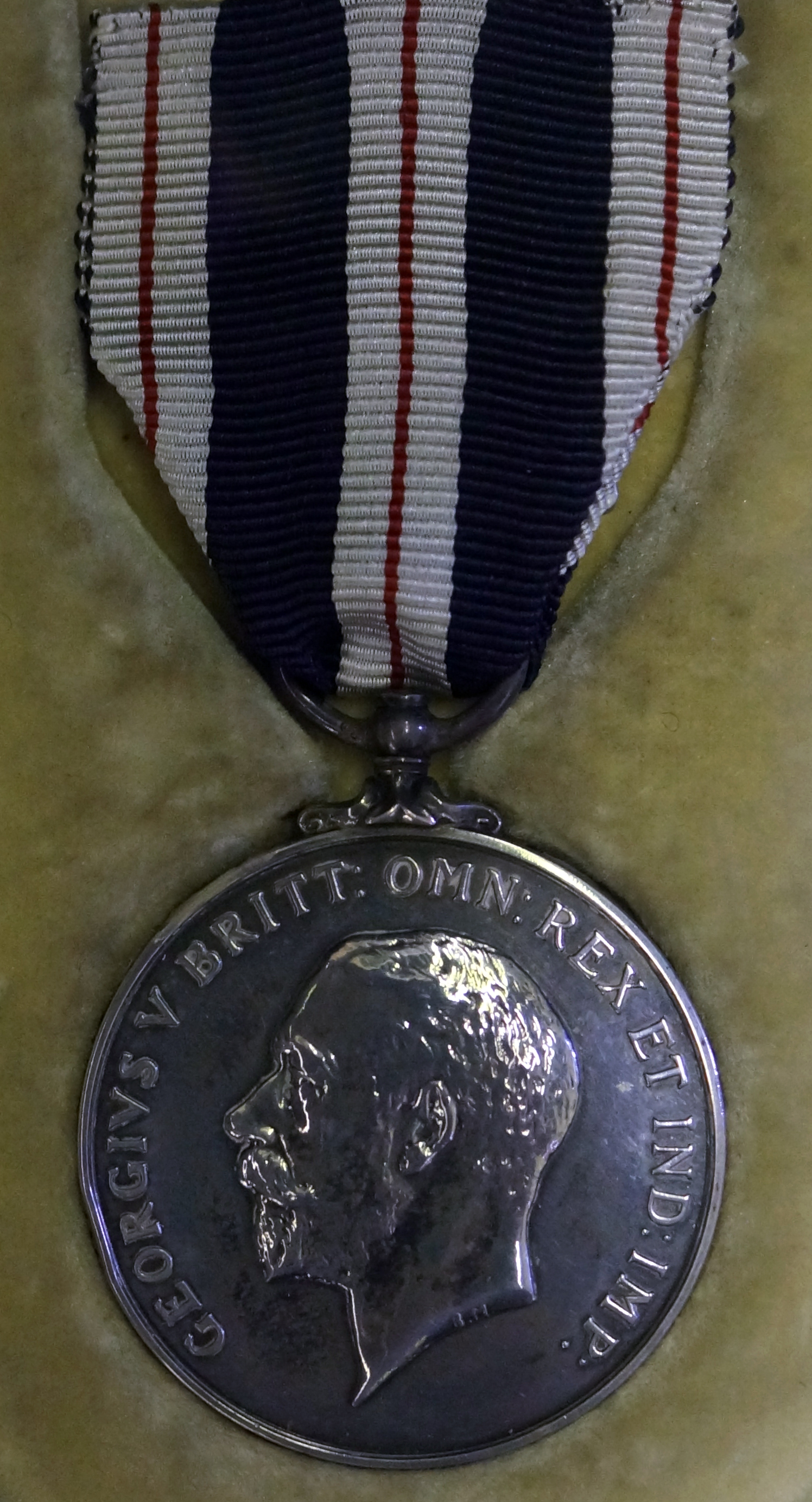
King's Police Medal with the riband for gallantry

England and Wales

Police

- Francis Caldwell MVO Chief Constable, Liverpool City Police
- Lieutenant-Colonel Alan Chichester, Chief Constable, Huntingdon County Constabulary
- John Allen, Superintendent and Deputy-Chief Constable, Gloucester County Constabulary
- Arthur Ernest Bassom, Superintendent, Metropolitan Police
- Robert John Burton, Superintendent, West Riding Constabulary
- John Chandler, Superintendent, Nottingham County Police
- Benjamin Davies, Acting Superintendent, Cardiff City Police
- John Spendlove, Chief Superintendent, Stafford County Constabulary
- Arthur Richard Bellamy, Constable, Metropolitan Police
- Frank Bryant, Constable, Metropolitan Police
- Thomas William Bubb, Constable, West Sussex Constabulary
- John Glass Colligan, Constable, Birkenhead Borough Police
- David Davies, Constable, Metropolitan Police
- Charles Kidd, Constable, Metropolitan Police
- Thomas Edwin Moore, Constable, Great Yarmouth Borough Police
- Francis Stubbs, Constable, Metropolitan Police

Fire Brigades

- Frederick Gibbons Croasdell, Superintendent, Edmonton Fire Brigade
- Alfred Johnson, Chief Officer, Ramsgate Fire Brigade
- Alfred Robert Tozer, Chief Officer, Birmingham Fire Brigade
- Frederick Bambridge Willis, Senior Superintendent, London Fire Brigade
- John Morgan Home (deceased), Second Officer, Southgate Volunteer Fire Brigade
- Thomas Matthew Crowe, Station Officer, London Fire Brigade
- Walter Knight Hanscombe (deceased), Fireman, Southgate Volunteer Fire Brigade
- Hariph Robert Taylor, Fireman, Colne Fire Brigade

Scotland

Police

- William Anderson, Chief Constable, Aberdeen City Police
- John McGimpsey, Chief Detective Inspector, City of Glasgow Police
- Alexander Hay, Constable, Nairn County Constabulary
- Alexander Macvicar, Constable, Inverness County Constabulary

Fire Brigades

- James Sinclair Weir, Firemaster, Dundee

Ireland

Police

- George Fitzgerald William Craig, District Inspector, Royal Irish Constabulary
- Martin Boyle, Head Constable, Royal Irish Constabulary
- John Browne, Head Constable, Royal Irish Constabulary
- John Allingham Johnston, Superintendent, Belfast Harbour Police
- Michael Flanagan, Sergeant, Royal Irish Constabulary
- Patrick Hefferman, Sergeant, Dublin Metropolitan Police
- Thomas Hynes, Constable, Royal Irish Constabulary
- Thomas Reid, Constable, Dublin Metropolitan Police

Fire Brigades

- Edward Doyle, Member of the City of Dublin Fire Brigade
- Joseph Lynch, Member of the City of Dublin Fire Brigade

British India

- Frank Seaver Scottney George, Superintendent, Madras Police
- Khan Babadur Muhammad Amin-ud-Dm Sahib, Deputy Superintendent, Madras Police
- Paramanandam Pillai Duraswami Pillai Inspector, Madras Police
- Abdul Quadir Sahib, Constable, Madras Police
- Vithoo Jagojee Bihonslay Jamadar, Bombay City Police
- Frederick George Collett, Assistant Superintendent, Bombay Police
- Yadav Sadoba, Constable, Bombay Police
- Rajawali Nadirkhan, Acting Head Constable, Bombay Police
- Bhagwan Luxman, Head Constable, Bombay Police
- Umar Buran, Inspector, Bombay Police
- Khan Saheb Shaikh Ahmed Shaikh Baud, Headquarters, Chief Constable, Bombay Police
- James William Fellowes, District Superintendent, Bombay Police
- Edwin Alfred John Barnes, Senior Inspector, Aden Police
- Bijoy Narayan Basu, Inspector, Bengal Police
- Phanindra Kumar Basu, Inspector, Bengal Police
- Ban Behari Mukherji, Inspector, Beoigal Police
- Rasik Lai Basu, Officiating Sub-Inspector, Bengal Police
- Aonrita Lai Bhattacharji, Inspector, Bengal Police
- Shamsuddahar, Sub-Inspector, Bengal Police
- Nityananda Nandi, Sub-Inspector, Bengal Police
- Hajari Lall Mukherji, Inspector, Bengal Police
- Brian Wardle, Officiating Additional Superintendent, Bengal Police
- Prafulla, Kumar Biswas, Inspector, Bengal Police
- Basanta Kumar Mukerji, Officiating Inspector, Bengal Police
- Musleh-ud-din, Head Constable, United Provinces Police
- Muhammad Sihafiq, Constable, United Provinces Police
- Robert John Sherwood Dodd, Superintendent, United Provinces Police
- Henry Robert Sharpe, Deputy Inspector-General, United Provinces Police
- William Edmund Botting, Executive Officer Lucknow Fire Brigade
- Agha Saadat Ali Khan Deputy Superintendent, Punjab Police
- Khan Sahib Munshi Ghulam Rasul, Deputy Superintendent, Punjab Police
- Hakim Ikram-ul-Hag, Temporary Deputy Superintendent, Punjab Police
- Sardar Anup Singh, Inspector, Punjab Police
- Lancelot Colin Bradford Clascock MVO Superintendent, Punjab Police
- Sydney Jennings, District Superintendent Burma Police
- Shanker Singh, 2nd grade Subadar, Burma Military Police
- Maung Ba, 1st grade Head Constable, Burma Police
- Maung Hla Baw, Deputy Superintendent, Burma Police
- Walter Swain, Superintendent, Bihar and Orissa Police
- John Dun Boylan, Superintendent, Bihar and Orissa Police
- Wilfred Arthur Prince Sealy, Superintendent, Bihar and Orissa Police
- Rai Bahadur Sri Krishna Mahapatra, Deputy Superintendent, Bihar and Orissa Police
- Allan Stainer Hayling, Inspector, Bihar and Orissa Police
- Dandi Ram Salai, Constable, Assam Police
- Chandi Ram Katoni, Constable, Assam Police
- Subadar Bhowan Singh Bight, Assam Rifles Subadar Pokul Thapa, Assam Rifles
- John Murray Ewart, Superintendent, North-West Frontier Province Police
- Umar Khan, Head Constable, North-West Frontier Province Police
- Arthur Finch Perrott, Assistant Superintendent, North-West Frontier Province Police
- Khan Bahadur Aga Jan, Subadar-Major, Andamans and Nicobar Police
- Thakur Din, Constable, Central India Agency Police
- Allen George Blanchett, Inspector, Ajmer Metwara Police

New South Wales

- John Walker, Inspector, Criminal Investigation Branch of the Police Department
- Nicholas George Sparks, Chief Officer of Fire Brigades
- Frank Jackson, Deputy Chief Officer of Fire Brigades
- Thomas George Cutts, District Officer of Fire Brigades
- John Tait, Superintendent Metropolitan, Police District
- John Joseph Wallace Water, Police Inspector, Sydney
- Reverend Doctor Lewis Rousseau Scudder, American Aroot Mission, Madras
- Walter Samuel Millard, Senior Partner, Messrs. Phipson and Company, Bombay

South Africa

- Willeni Cornells van Kyneveld, Inspector, South African Police
- Petrus Paulus Jacobus Botha, Lance Corporal, South African Police

Fiji

- Josua, Constable, Fiji Constabulary

Jamaica

- Michael Bernard O'Sullivan, Inspector of Constabulary
- James Alexander Miller, 1st Class Constable and Detective
- Thomas James Hazlett, Acting Deputy Inspector of Constabulary
- Owen Franklin Wright, Inspector of Constabulary
- William Nathaniel Black, Sergeant Major of Constabulary
- Walter Maxwell Bernard, Sergeant Major of Constabulary
- Charles Samuel Thomas, Sergeant of Constabulary

Leeward Islands

- Major William Edward Wilders, Inspector of Police
- Joseph Adolphus Byron, Lance Corporal of Police
- George Adolptus Warner, Lance Corporal of Police
- Edwin Ernest Thomas, Lance Corporal of Police
- Edward A. Jones, Station Sergeant of Police

Nigeria

- Captain Charles Edward Johnstone, late Inspector-General of Police, Southern Provinces
- Edwin Stanhope Willoughby, late Assistant Superintendent of Police, Southern Provinces
- John Radcliff, Assistant Commissioner of Police, Northern Provinces

East Africa

- James Maddy Lumley, Assistant Superintendent of Police
- David Marsh, 1st Class Constable

Uganda

- William Younger, Temporary Assistant Superintendent of Police

Canada

- Thomas Caulkin, Sergeant Major, Royal North-West Mounted Police
