= Edgar S. Gorrell =

American military officer & aviation pioneer (1891-1945)

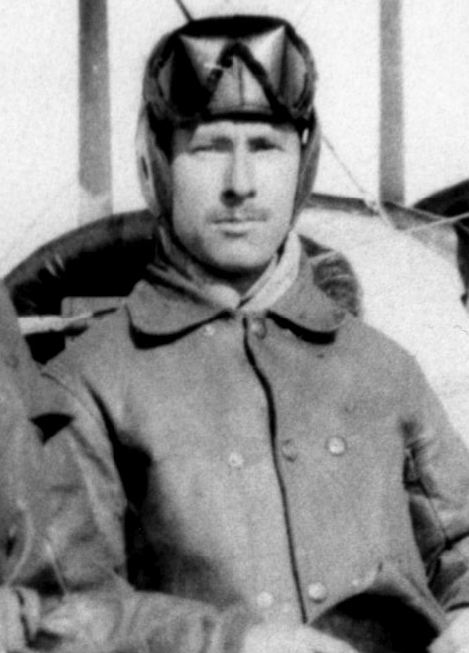
- Gorrell at field headquarters near Casas Grandes, Mexico, April 1916
- Born: Edgar Staley Gorrell; February 3, 1891; Baltimore, Maryland
- Died: March 5, 1945 (aged 54); Washington, D.C.
- Burial place: United States Military Academy
- Military career
- Allegiance: United States of America
- Branch: Infantry, United States Army; Aviation Section, Signal Corps; Air Service, United States Army
- Service years: 1912–1920
- Rank: Colonel
- Nickname: "Nap"
- Unit: 1st Aero Squadron
- Commands: None
- Conflicts: Punitive Expedition; World War I
- Awards: Army Distinguished Service Medal
- Other work: President, Stutz Motor Company; President, Air Transport Association of America

Edgar Staley Gorrell (February 3, 1891 – March 5, 1945) was an American military officer, aviation pioneer, historian, manufacturing entrepreneur, and advocate for the airline industry. He served eight years in the United States Army, most of it with the Air Service, becoming a colonel at the age of 27 during World War I. He left the army in 1920 to enter private business, first as an executive in the automotive industry, then briefly operating his own investment company to finance the mass construction of private homes. For the last nine years of his life he was the first president of the Air Transport Association of America (ATA), a trade association dedicated to airline safety and the economic growth of the industry.

A 1912 graduate of the United States Military Academy, Gorrell served an obligatory two years in the infantry before volunteering for assignment to the Aviation Section, Signal Corps, in which he became a military aviator in 1915. His only flying assignment was with the 1st Aero Squadron, the Army's first aviation unit, which he accompanied to Mexico as part of the Punitive Expedition. Deficiencies in American military aviation exposed during the campaign led to Gorrell's assignment to MIT, where he earned an advanced degree in aeronautical engineering. His technical expertise led to his inclusion in the Bolling Mission in the opening months of U.S. participation in World War I, followed by staff duties with the American Expeditionary Force. He rose rapidly in rank as a wartime airman from first lieutenant to colonel between July 1916 and October 1918.

Gorrell was an early advocate for the concept of strategic bombing, submitting a staff study in November 1917 proposing a sustained day-night campaign against the German munitions industry. The paper owed much to concepts earlier developed by British planners, but it was never implemented during the war. Described as the "earliest, clearest...statement of the American conception of the employment of airpower," it became the basis for the doctrine of strategic bombing adopted by the Air Corps 20 years later, and ultimately the rationale for creation of the United States Air Force as a separate military service. At the conclusion of hostilities Gorrell was made assistant chief of staff of the Air Service of the AEF with responsibility for compilation and completion of an official History of the Air Service, AEF, covering all its organizational, operational, and technical activities during the war. The history ultimately totaled 280 indexed volumes and became commonly known as "Gorrell's History."

In his capacity as head of the ATA, Gorrell advocated regulation of the airline industry to promote sustained growth, and also developed a strategy for use of the airlines during wartime to supplement a military air transport effort. His ideas on the use of airlines under government contract to provide worldwide air transport were sufficient to dissuade President Franklin D. Roosevelt from nationalizing the nation's scheduled airlines at the start of America's participation in World War II.

== Education and family relationships ==
Gorrell was the son of Charles Edgar Gorrell and Pamelia Stevenson Smith. His father was a carpenter in Baltimore, Maryland. His primary education was in the Baltimore City Schools and he attended secondary school at Baltimore City College between 1904 and 1908. Gorrell took competitive examinations for the United States Military Academy at West Point, New York, and was appointed by U.S. Senator Isidor Rayner to the class of 1912. During his military service he also completed the graduate program in aeronautical engineering at the Massachusetts Institute of Technology from September 1916 to April 1917, awarded a Master of Science degree in July 1917. He also received an honorary Doctor of Science from Norwich University and served on its board of trustees.

Following his return to civilian life in 1920, he married a longtime acquaintance, Ruth Maurice of New York, New York, on December 10, 1921. His wife was an honors graduate in chemistry of Sweet Briar College and did graduate work at Cornell University Medical College, becoming a clinical pathologist. They had a son, Edgar Staley Gorrell, Jr., in 1931. Gorrell married a second time, shortly before his sudden death in Washington, D.C., on March 5, 1945, from a heart attack, to Mary O’Dowd Weidman.

== Military career ==
=== West Point ===
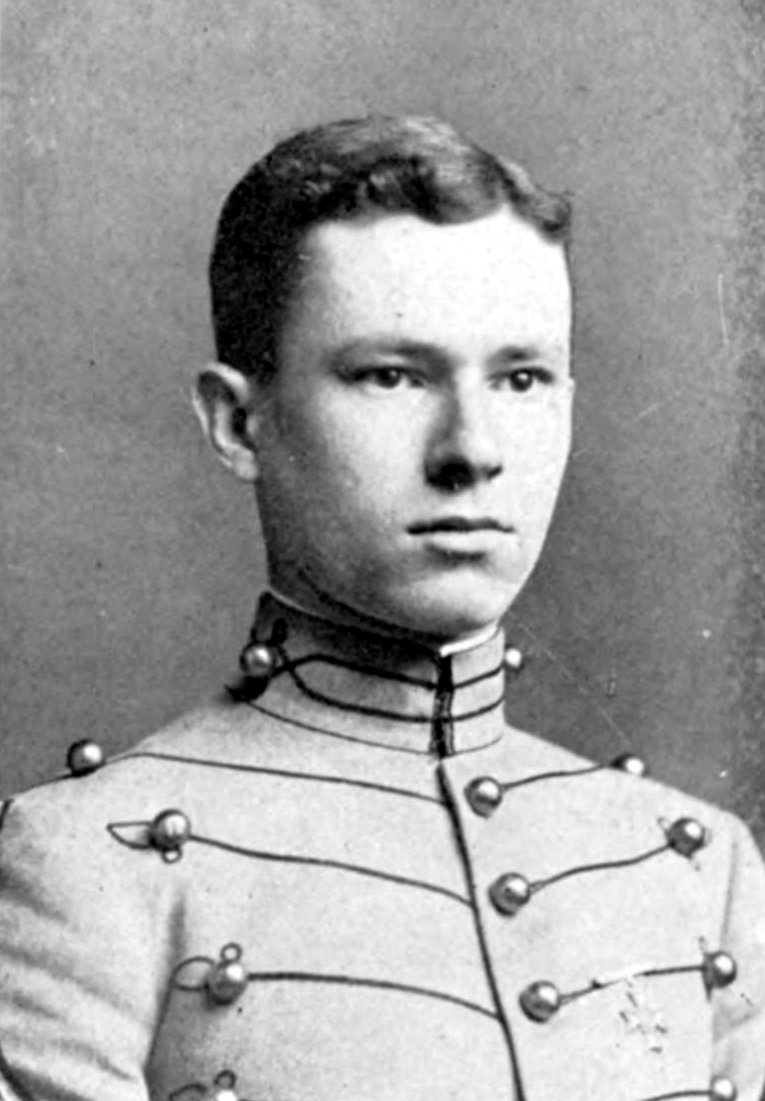
At West Point in 1912

Gorrell and the bulk of the USMA Class of 1912 were admitted to the academy on March 2, 1908, as the "class of new cadets." Gorrell had just turned 17 a month before. Their course of preliminary instruction lasted to June 10. The 1908 Official Register lists him as finishing 34th in general merit among the 112 new cadets advanced to the fourth class for the academic year beginning July 1, ranked 3rd in conduct, having accrued just 2 demerits during the preliminary period. He was in the upper half of his class in mathematics and ranked 23rd in English. Gorrell was assigned to Company C of the Corps of Cadets.

Gorrell maintained his relative class standing during all four years at the academy, finishing consistently in the upper half in academics. He excelled in all military aspects of the curriculum, finishing first in conduct twice (and first overall for the four years at USMA) and never lower than 7th, which was during his plebe year. He also finished first overall in drill regulations. He advanced in cadet rank in every class year, fulfilling a pledge he made as a plebe to become the captain of Company C. He graduated on June 12, 1912, finishing 32nd in general merit among his 95 classmates.

Small in stature, slight, and boyish-looking, he was nicknamed "Nap" (derivative of "Napoleon") by his classmates in recognition of his military bearing. Gorrell pushed himself in athletics, going out for the football, track and field, and wrestling teams before settling in as an upperclassman on the broadsword squad, which he also managed for three years. As a "firstie" he won the individual broadsword championship. (Note: The yearbook also noted that he qualified as a "sharpshooter" with the M1903 Springfield rifle and used a furlough to learn to ride a horse so that he could participate in the academy's horse show.)

One of the most formative events in Gorrell's life occurred near the end of his "yearling" year. At about ten o'clock on the morning of May 29, 1910, Cadet Corporal Gorrell joined a throng of cadets trying to catch a glimpse of a historical event in the making. Pioneer aviator Glenn Curtiss was attempting to complete the first true cross-country flight in the United States, between Albany and New York City. (Note: In February 1909 Joseph Pulitzer and the New York World offered a $10,000 prize (about $240,000 in 2015 dollars; US Inflation Calculator) for the first flight before October made by any type of air machine from New York to Albany as part of the public tercentenary celebration of Henry Hudson's cruise upriver and Robert Fulton's 1807 retracing of the route in the steamboat North River. When a pair of dirigibles failed in an attempt during the celebration, the World extended the offer for a year and allowed it to be made in either direction, provided the trip was made within a 24-hour period using only two stops. Curtiss had decided to make the attempt after a week of rain during the celebration on Governors Island had resulted in an embarrassing lack of success in competition with the Wright Brothers. During the spring of 1910 he secretly built an aircraft just for the flight, tested it in Memphis, Tennessee, and was rushing to win the prize before other candidates including Clifford B. Harmon and Charles K. Hamilton could make attempts. (Roseberry 1991, pp. 262-262)) An hour earlier a member of the academy staff had telephoned Curtiss during a refueling stop near Poughkeepsie urging him to land on the parade ground so that the cadets could inspect the craft but was turned down. The Corps had then assembled at Trophy Point.

Curtiss approached Storm King Mountain four miles (6.4 km) north of the academy at 2,000 feet (610 m), wary of the wind currents in the gorge. However, gusts caused him to lose control of the airplane momentarily, causing the plane to descend precipitously. He recovered after nearly being tossed out of the craft but the severe up and downdrafts continued. He descended to just 40 feet (12 m) above the Hudson River in hopes of finding calmer air. Many of the cadets including Gorrell ran to Cullum Hall on the other side of the promontory, where they could clearly see the airplane as it rounded the point. Gorrell and the others waved their caps and gave a raucous football cheer, clearly observed by Curtiss as he passed. Gorrell averred that from that moment forward he was determined to become an Army aviator. (Note: Curtiss completed the historic 150-mile flight in just short of four hours, including two stops for fuel, with a total flight time of two hours and 51 minutes. (Roseberry 1991, p. 280))

=== Aviation School ===
Required to complete a period of troop duty before he could apply to be detailed to the Aviation Section, Gorrell selected Infantry as his branch of service and was commissioned a 2d lieutenant in the 30th Infantry Regiment. He joined Company L at Fort William H. Seward on September 12, 1912, serving two years in the Territory of Alaska before returning with his company to the Presidio of San Francisco in California on July 14, 1914. He was detached from the 30th Infantry on December 23 and assigned to the Signal Corps Aviation School at San Diego, California for flying training. (Note: Gorrell's West Point classmate 2nd Lt. Walter G. "Mike" Kilner preceded him to the Aviation School by seven weeks. Kilner graduated from flying training a month before Gorrell and they served in Mexico together in 1916. During World War I Kilner, three years older than Gorrell, held the distinction of being the Army's youngest full colonel until Gorrell took the "title" away from him in October 1918. Kilner eventually became a brigadier general and Assistant Chief of the Air Corps in 1938.) The school was located on North Island near Coronado and was still a primitive program with no written syllabus. It published its first regulations six days after Gorrell's arrival on December 28, 1914. By the end of January 1915 the school had 11 students in training including Gorrell.

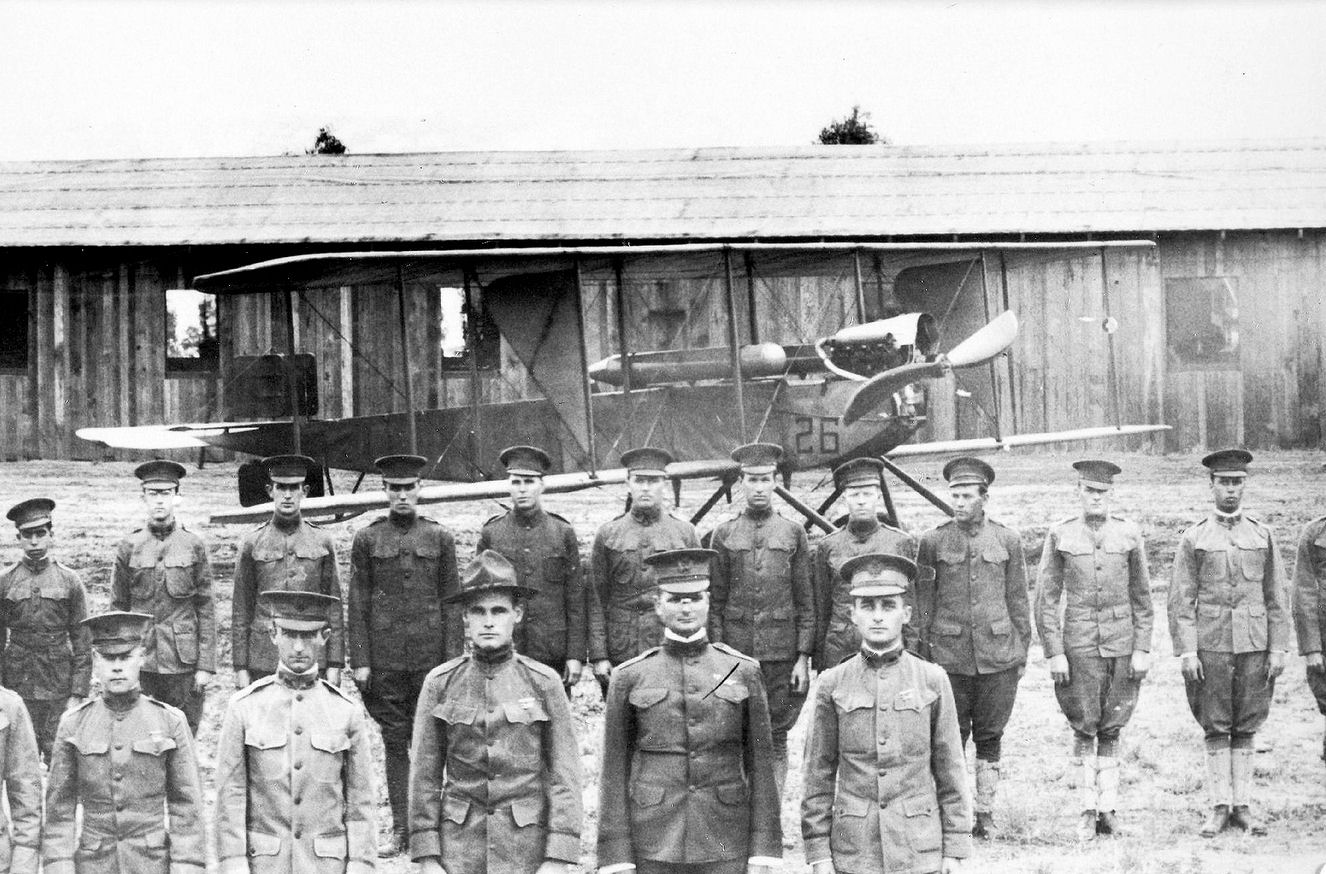
S.C. No. 26, a Burgess H trainer, at North Island, 1915

The course of instruction was individually tailored in three phases. The first introduced the student to flying with civilian instructor Francis A. "Doc" Wildman in S.C. 34, a Curtis F flying boat, an aircraft heavier than its land counterpart, making it safer to fly in San Diego's gusty conditions at low altitude and enabling the student to perform up to six times as many landings as could be made in a land airplane in the same time. After four to five hours of this phase, the student was handed off to civilian instructor Oscar A. Brindley in a Burgess Model H trainer. After his solo, the candidate had a check ride with the Officer in Charge of Training to determine if his instruction was to continue. He then flew solo until he was ready to take the test for his Fédération Aéronautique Internationale (FAI) pilot's license, a requirement for advancing to the third phase. In this Gorrell received training in cross-country flying under a military instructor, culminating in his examination for the rating of Junior Military Aviator (JMA).

In February, Gorrell was part of a group of student officers instructed in a new course on the maintenance and repair of the Curtiss OX engine. He obtained his FAI certificate in June and entered the final phase of instruction. On June 26, nearing the end of his training, Gorrell was making a solo flight from San Diego to Long Beach, California in S.C. No. 37, a Martin TT tractor-configured (forward-facing propeller) airplane, when his engine began vibrating and the propeller flew off, destroying his landing gear. He glided into an alfalfa field, stalling in the process, and flipped the aircraft on its back. Gorrell was not injured in the crash.

The first standardized examination for JMA was promulgated on April 10 and had both technical and flying requirements. On July 1 the flying aspect was increased to require a candidate to demonstrate:

*Five figure 8’s around pylons, keeping all parts of machine inside a circle whose radius is 300 feet. *Climb out of a square field 900 feet on a side and attain 500-feet altitude, keeping all parts of the machine inside of square during climb. *Climb 3,000 feet, kill motor, spiral down, changing direction of spiral, that is, from left to right, and land within 150 feet of previously designated mark. *Land with dead motor in a field 800 feet by 100 feet, assuming said field to be surrounded by a 10-foot obstacle. *From 500 feet altitude land within 100 feet of previously designated point with dead motor. *Cross-country triangular flight without landing, of approximately 60 miles, passing over the following points: starting from North Island, over Del Mar, La Mesa, Coronado Heights. *Straightaway cross-country flight of about 90 miles without landing from the vicinity of Santa Ana, California, to North Island, California.

Gorrell passed the examination and received his JMA rating on July 12, 1915, which under provisions of the Aviation Act of 1914 automatically carried with it a temporary promotion of one grade to 1st lieutenant, Aviation Section Signal Corps (ASSC) and award of an Expert Aviator's certificate from the Aero Club of America, then the national governing body of civil aviation in the United States. (Note: Gorrell was awarded FAI Certificate No. 324 and Expert Aviator Certificate No. 39.)

=== 1st Aero Squadron ===
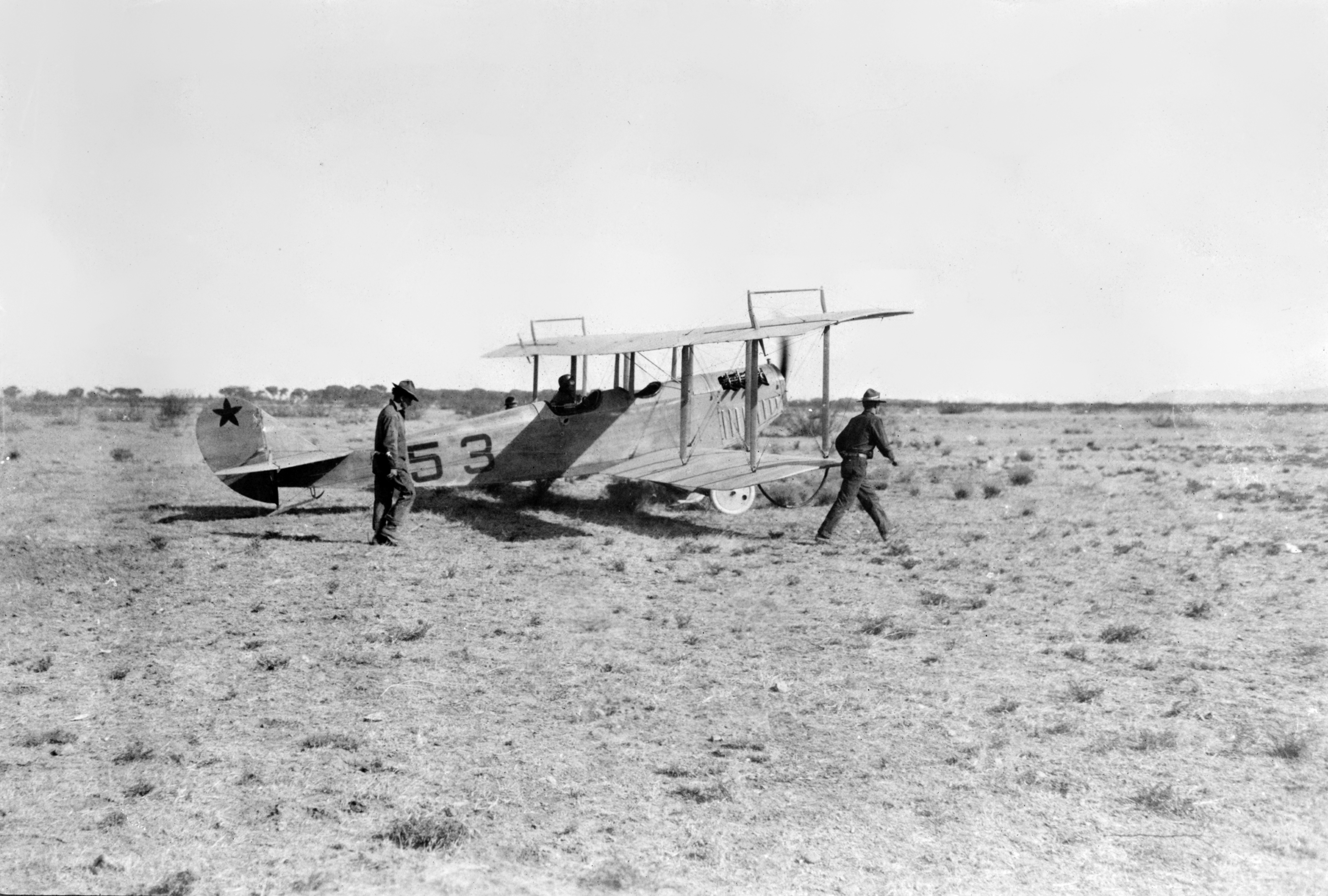
1st Aero Squadron JN3 "Jennie" in Mexico, April 1916

Gorrell remained with the Signal Corps Aviation School in Coronado as its secretary (adjutant). The 1st Aero Squadron, based on the same field, had received eight new Curtiss JN2 "Jennies" and spare engines on June 21, but before the squadron could fully flight test the new aircraft it was ordered to Fort Sill, Oklahoma. Disassembling and crating the aircraft again, the squadron left San Diego by train on July 26. A section of two aircraft and four pilots was ordered to Brownsville, Texas shortly after its arrival in Oklahoma. Gorrell joined the squadron when it relocated to Fort Sam Houston, Texas, on November 25. As junior officer in the squadron, (Note: Gorrell had trained with 1st Lt. Ira A. Rader at San Diego and both received their JMA ratings at the same time, but Rader had proceeded to Oklahoma with the 1st Aero Squadron while Gorrell remained at the school.) he was assigned the collateral duties of squadron adjutant and supply officer. (Note: The TO&E slot of a non-flying "Supply Officer" in the squadron was not authorized before 1917.)

By then the 1st Aero Squadron had suffered a number of setbacks, enduring two crashes and serious injuries to two pilots, transfer to a new "air center" in San Antonio on which no work had been done in preparation of its arrival, and worst of all, a near mutiny by the pilots of the squadron over the inadequacies of the JN2. In addition to sloppy workmanship and poor materials the airplane was underpowered with substandard engines and had serious design flaws in the wings and tail that made it unsafe. The head of the Aviation Section was unsympathetic to the complaints and slow to correct them, aggravating already serious divisions between the aviators and their nonflying commanders that had begun the year before when the pusher airplanes had shown similarly unsafe performance characteristics. The matter came to a head when the acting commander of the Brownsville detachment, 1st Lt. Byron Q. Jones, bypassed the chain of command and sent a written complaint directly to the commanding general of the Southern Department, who grounded the aircraft. Two newer JN3s arrived as replacements and the six remaining JN2s were modified with new wings, empennages, and engines to JN3 standard. (Note: For more on the divisions see Aviation Section, U.S. Signal Corps#The Goodier court-martial.)

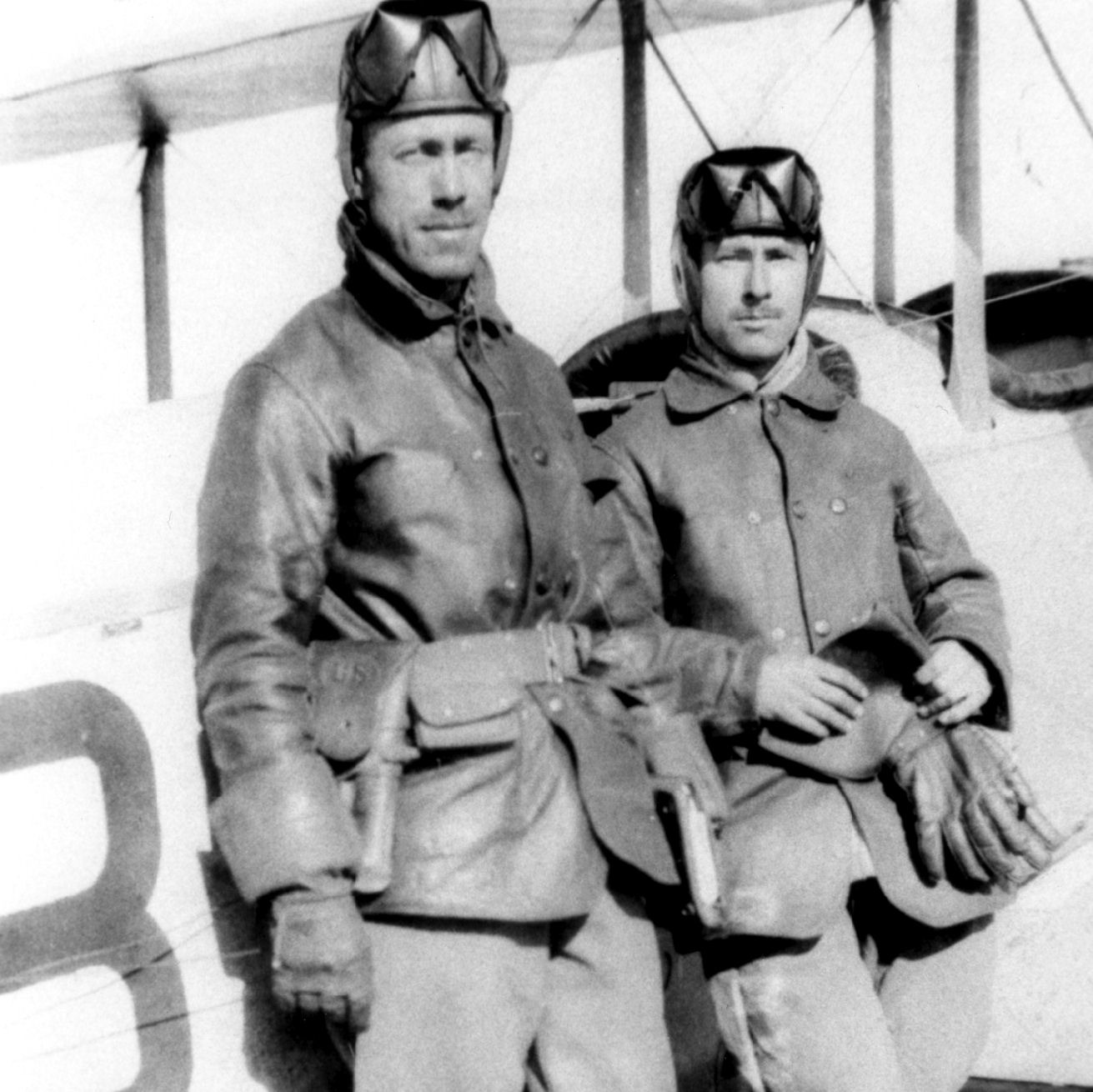
Gorrell (right) and 1st Lt. Herbert A. Dargue at Casas Grandes, Mexico, posing with S.C. No. 43 on April 11, 1916

While work went forward on improving camp conditions at the new base, problems with the airplanes continued. With the added weight of improvements, the JN3s were no more capable than before modification. This situation still existed when Pancho Villa and a force of 500 Mexican insurgents crossed the border on March 9, 1916, and raided Columbus, New Mexico. The next day President Woodrow Wilson authorized a military expedition commanded by Brig. Gen. John J. Pershing to pursue the retreating Villistas into Mexico and capture Villa if possible. United States Secretary of War Newton D. Baker ordered that the 1st Aero Squadron be included in the expedition for liaison duties and aerial reconnaissance, and on March 12 it dismantled its aircraft at Fort Sam Houston and loaded them onto a train, along with all its motor transport and engineering section. Gorrell was among the ten aviators sent with the eight airplanes to Columbus at noon on March 13, arriving on the morning of March 15. The expedition had already marched into Mexico as the squadron unloaded its equipment.

The 1st Aero Squadron took several days to prepare for field duty. Its ten four-wheel drive Jeffery Quad trucks were the only motor transport immediately available to the expedition when the Mexican government disputed American use of its railroads, and these were impressed into service hauling materiel and men south. Gorrell was assigned to command the first "truck train," two trucks sent into Mexico on the night of March 15–16. Airplane mechanics untrained in the use of infantry weapons guarded the small convoy when it stopped until daylight in the village of Las Palomas before continuing on to the expedition's headquarters at Casas Grandes, Chihuahua.

Early on the afternoon of March 19, after four days of assembling and testing their airplanes, doing the same for 27 new Jeffery Quads sent to the expedition, and moving supplies and men into Mexico, the 1st Aero Squadron received orders to join the expedition immediately at its new base. However, the nine flyers including Gorrell making the flight were unable to complete preparations before twilight and unwisely attempted to complete the two-hour flight, although untrained in night flying and having no means of navigating to Casas Grandes after dark. Gorrell's airplane (Note: Gorrell was assigned to fly Signal Corps Number 52 (S.C. No. 52), one of the two original JN3s.) was so heavy with fuel and gear that he barely cleared a wire fence at the end of the takeoff field. Another of the eight JN3s (Note: S.C. No. 42, flown by Kilner.) had difficulty hurdling the same fence and immediately developed engine trouble, circling back to land. Four managed to remain in proximity to each other and landed together near La Ascención, halfway to their destination. The other three, including Gorrell, flew on individually in the dark. Gorrell flew past the American camp, unaware of its presence and drawn by the light of a wildfire he mistook for a bonfire that was to have been lit to mark the landing ground. (Note: Unbeknownst to the aviators, field headquarters and a temporary airfield had been established 15 miles away at the old Mormon colony of Colonia Dublán.) He decided he had flown too far south and reversed course, finding and guiding on the star Polaris.

When his fuel was exhausted (Note: This source asserts that his plane's motor lost oil and was in danger of seizing up. Hennessy (p. 168) states he discovered a leak in the fuel tank after landing. The aircraft was able to take off again using the same engine, so likely Gorrell's anxiety stemmed from a combination of perceptions exacerbated by flying at night.) he performed a short-field deadstick landing in darkness without damaging the airplane, coming down near a stream and what appeared to be several abandoned adobe buildings. He continued north on foot, expecting to cross the expedition's line of communications at some point, but reversed course again when he experienced symptoms of heat exhaustion after the sun came up on March 20. Although he fainted several times, Gorrell retraced his path to S.C. No. 52 and the source of water. Later Gorrell encountered a Mexican mounted on a horse at one of the nearby buildings, and through a combination of offering money and waving his service pistol, persuaded the man to take him the 20–30 miles to La Ascención, reaching it on March 21. He was provided a small amount of gasoline and engine oil the next day and driven to his airplane in an automobile being used by the 6th Infantry, guarding the line of communications. In heavy rain and wind he took off and flew back to nearby Ojo de Federico to refuel from a passing truck train. However, during the ensuing takeoff the crosswind caused the lower left wing to strike the drum from which he had taken on fuel, destroying part of the spar. When fabric on the wing began to tear away, he landed again at Ojo de Federico. He sent word of his whereabouts to the squadron and hitched a ride on a truck convoy the next day, March 23, reaching Casas Grandes at noon. (Note: Gorrell and a group of mechanics in two Quads returned to S.C. No. 52 on March 25, finding it as he had left it. They used a spare strut and linen to make a patch over the hole in the wing and Gorrell flew it to Casas Grandes. The next day he flew it to Columbus to have a new wing installed. (Miller, pp. 28 and 31))

The 1st Aero Squadron lost two of its eight JN3s during the move to Casas Grandes. It began operations with the remainder on March 20 but the aircraft performed poorly flying in the mountains and their prevalent downdrafts, while their laminated propellers were prone to fall apart in the dry conditions. An article by freelance journalist Webb Miller detailing the frustrations of the pilots appeared April 3 in the New York World, causing a furor at the highest level of the War Department over criticisms of the Aviation Section's senior officers. Of those quoted, only Gorrell was willing to admit to having spoken with Miller, but when Pershing chose to support his aviators, the controversy died. (Note: Gorrell's obituary written for the West Point Association of Graduates suggests that his subsequent assignment to MIT while the squadron was still actively campaigning was a "kick upstairs" resulting from the dust-up. Whatever the case, the 1st Aero Squadron was Gorrell's only flying assignment.) Noteworthy among Gorrell's flying missions was that of April 15 in which he was an observer with 1st Lt. Herbert A. Dargue. The reconnaissance flight covered 415 miles in three legs, at the time an operational record.

Gorrell received the permanent establishment rank of 1st Lieutenant of Infantry on July 1, 1916, and with it an automatic temporary promotion to captain, ASSC. On August 31 he was detached from the 1st Aero Squadron and ordered to report to the Massachusetts Institute of Technology on September 21 to begin post-graduate study in aeronautical engineering. Gorrell received a Master of Science degree from MIT on July 5, 1917, by which time the United States was at war with Germany and Gorrell was serving in France.

=== World War I ===
Gorrell had nearly completed his studies at MIT when the United States declared war on Germany on April 6, 1917. That evening, already under orders for post-graduation assignment to the Office of the Chief Signal Officer (OCSO) in Washington, D.C., he reported for duty as Chief of Intelligence of the Aeronautical Division. (Note: The Aeronautical Division was an administrative, not a tactical, organization that acted as the headquarters of the "Aviation Section." It was renamed the "Air Division" on October 1, 1917, and was replaced entirely by the Division of Military Aeronautics (DMA) on April 24, 1918.) He was assigned May 5 with Major Benjamin Foulois and Captain Virginius Clark as the Army's representatives on the Joint (Army-Navy) Aircraft Technical Board. Gorrell and Foulois (Note: Foulois had been Gorrell's squadron commander in Mexico.) worked together on preparation of a budget proposal to Congress for expansion of the Aviation Section. Using ordinary grocery wrapping paper, Gorrell prepared large charts breaking down the appropriations needed to fund expansion as a briefing aid for the Chief Signal Officer, Brig. Gen. George O. Squier. These amounted to more than $600,000,000, (Note: More than $11 billion in 2015 dollars.) a sum noted by Squier as being greater than that enacted for the recent building of the Panama Canal. Squier endorsed the proposal and Gorrell joined Major Raynal C. Bolling, formerly general counsel for U.S. Steel, in drafting the necessary legislation. (Note: The resulting Aviation Act (40 Stat. 243), approved July 24, 1917, was the largest appropriation by Congress for any single purpose to that time and was in addition to two earlier war appropriations for aeronautics, $10.8M passed on May 12 and $43.5M on June 15. (Mooney and Layman 1944, p. 28)) Gorrell was promoted to captain in his branch and major, ASSC as part of the mass promotions of pre-war officers on May 15, 1917.

At the end of May, Gorrell and the Joint Army-Navy Board received a proposal from French Premier Alexandre Ribot that the United States create an aviation corps of 4,500 airplanes to be ready for combat by the spring of 1918 and from it drew up an outline for the manufacture of airplanes and engines to meet the requirements. After the Aircraft Production Board (APB) rejected European proposals that the United States manufacture for its own use aircraft already being produced in Europe, and pay a royalty on every airplane built, (Note: Gorrell later testified to Congress that in his view the United States was being asked to pay an "entrance fee" to get into the war. (October 24, 1919, to the aviation subcommittee of the House Select Committee on Expenditures in the War Department)) Bolling was appointed to the board and charged with taking a commission to Europe to resolve the royalty controversy and select aircraft types with which to arm the United States. determining which should be made under license in America and which should be purchased from Europeans. Gorrell and Clark, in their capacity as aeronautical engineers, joined Bolling as the Army's members on the 12-person commission, which became known as the "Bolling Mission." The mission sailed from New York aboard the RMS Adriatic on June 17, 1917, arriving in Liverpool on June 26. The Bolling Mission spent nearly six weeks in England, France, and Italy gathering information in fulfillment of its mission, after which both Bolling and Gorrell remained in France on the staff of the American Expeditionary Forces.

Gorrell's initial AEF assignment was as a staff officer to the nascent "Air Service, Line of Communications" in Paris, a position eventually designated as Chief of the Technical Section. (Note: The aviation staff of the AEF was set up in August 1917 to prepare itself to "hit the ground running" when the "Air Service, AEF" was formally established in orders on September 3. Bolling was promoted to colonel and made "Director of Air Service Supply.") His job as the Air Service's chief engineering officer was essentially a continuation of the work he performed for the Bolling Mission except that the materiel he procured and the information collected were for operational use in combat rather than for APB study in the United States. In addition to identifying and performing the necessary functions of his job in the three months he spent as chief, Gorrell also built the Technical Section from a one-man office to a functioning staff section of seven divisions staffed by 19 officers and 31 enlisted men, and operated an airfield at Orly for experimental aviation and acceptance of new aircraft. (Note: Ultimately there were nine divisions of the Technical Section. The Final Report describes them as "airplanes, engines, airplane instruments, metallurgy, ordering and acceptance, chemistry, technical data, history and research, and drafting." A tenth division, armaments, was transferred to another staff section. (Volume I, p. 131)) Gorrell was ultimately responsible for the acquisition of $80 million of aircraft, equipment and other property for Air Service use in his brief time as head of the section.

Gorrell was promoted to lieutenant colonel (temporary, Signal Corps) on October 27, 1917. In November Foulois, now a general and ranking officer in the Air Service, arrived from the United States with a large staff of non-flyers to replace virtually all of the aviation officers who had built up the original Air Service staff. (Note: Gorrell's memorial page wryly observed that "at the end of this hectic period an entire boat load of people landed in France to take on the jobs that Colonel Gorrell had been holding down alone.")

==== Strategic bombing plan ====
His ex officio superior while chief of the Technical Section was Col. Billy Mitchell, who was already in Europe as an observer when war was declared and succeeded Gorrell's former squadron mate, Major Townsend F. Dodd, as Aviation Officer of the AEF during the period when Gorrell was in England. (Note: Dodd was promoted to colonel and designated "Director of Air Service Instruction".) Mitchell, requiring an expert to formulate the aircraft requirements for a force to bomb Germany, selected Gorrell for the position when the Bolling Mission broke up in early August. Mitchell's initial recommendation to AEF commanding general John Pershing for such a force had been ignored in the first proposed organization (the "59-Squadron plan") of the Air Service issued in July. In their meetings with the Allies' aviation experts, Gorrell and Bolling had both been favorably impressed by arguments for a bomber force put forth by Sir David Henderson, Director-General of Military Aeronautics and formerly head of the Royal Flying Corps, and by the actual use of such a force by the Italians. (Note: Henderson had been strongly influenced by a trio of German daytime bombing raids on London in the weeks preceding his meeting with the commission. The Italians were already bombing Austria (the only Allied nation then engaged in strategic bombardment) with up to 140 bombers on a single mission, and Caproni's vision of airpower mirrored that of his friend Giulio Douhet. This led to Bolling recommending in his final report to the APB that bombardment aircraft play a major role in U.S. plans, but in expressing his view in ratios, he placed the bombardment portion third in sequence and it was inadvertently given a low priority in planning.) Gorrell in particular was persuaded of its value by the designer of the Italians' tri-motor Ca.3 bomber, Gianni Caproni. Chief among his precepts was that for an offensive bombing campaign to be effective it must be "systematic, thorough and consistent," which Gorrell thoroughly endorsed.

In addition to studying Mitchell's views, garnered mainly from RFC commander Major-General Sir Hugh M. Trenchard, Gorrell consulted a number of individuals and their writings. In the Air Service, Majors Harold Fowler and Millard F. Harmon provided practical battle experience. In addition to his views, Caproni supplied him with an English-language copy of Let Us Kill The War; Let Us Aim at the Heart of the Enemy, a compilation of his ideas written by journalist Nino Salvaneschi. He also met with Wing Commander Spencer Grey, a liaison officer of the Royal Naval Air Service attached to Air Service headquarters who had participated in a number of bombing raids and developed specialized ordnance. However, the greatest influence on his work came from another RNAS pilot, Major Lord Tiverton. (Note: Hardinge Goulborn Giffard, Viscount Tiverton and later 2nd Earl of Halsbury.) Tiverton had just authored an in-depth study of strategic bombing against German industry to which Gorrell added sections addressing American objectives but otherwise used verbatim in his own paper.

Gorrell presented his study to Foulois on November 28, 1917, and was assigned on December 3 to head a planning branch for "Strategical Aviation, Zone of the Advance" to implement it. Pershing agreed to the plan in general on January 5, 1918, (Note: The Air Service was authorized to equip and train 30 night bombing squadrons when Caproni bombers became available.) and Gorrell was transferred to the General Headquarters of the AEF in Chaumont as the Air Service Officer of its G-3 (Plans and Operations) Section. In March, as his attention focused increasingly on tactical support matters, Gorrell helped the GHQ staff install an "Office of Air Intelligence" in its G-2 Section that included a bomb target unit which was the model for those used in World War II. Gorrell's successor as head of Strategical Aviation had been a mining industrialist in civilian life (Note: Ambrose Monnell of International Nickel Company) and was ineffectual in promoting the bombing plan, but Gorrell himself acknowledged that the primary obstacle to a sustained bombing campaign in 1918 was the failure in U.S. aircraft production that resulted in growing resistance by GHQ to any diversion of resources from tactical support of the ground forces. (Note: The resistance was best illustrated by the pointed re-naming of the "Strategical Aviation" branch in June 1918 to "GHQ Air Service Reserve" and placing it under direct control of the AEF staff.) The first night bombing unit of the Air Service, AEF (Note: The 155th Aero Squadron, equipped with DH-4 two-seat bombers, sent to Autreville Airdrome.) did not reach the Zone of the Advance until only two days prior to the cease-fire.

Gorrell's plan reflected its origins in Caproni's and Tiverton's ideas, a sustained campaign against key industrial nerve centers to end the three-year stalemate on the Western Front, with the goal of identifying and destroying critical components of the enemy's capability, not a generalized "total war" campaign against the German economy and civilian populace. Even so, the likelihood of support for such a campaign from the White House and the War Department was low had the war continued into the summer of 1919. Wrote Air Force historian Thomas Greer: "Gorrell's theories were destined to lie dormant in the Army of postwar years; it was not until the eve of the next World War that they emerged again...to win at last the blessing and support of the General Staff." Resurrected by the Air Corps Tactical School for inclusion in its 1937 and 1938 curriculum, it was characterized by USAF General General Lawrence S. Kuter as the "earliest, clearest, and least known statement of the American conception of the employment of air power."

Gorrell, just 27 years old, received promotion to colonel, Air Service on October 27, 1918, and became Assistant Chief of Air Service, AEF, the youngest officer in the U.S. Army to hold the rank since the American Civil War. His staff responsibilities at the close of hostilities on November 11, 1918, were coordination and liaison at the Army group level of all Air Service operations in the AEF. Gorrell was awarded the American Distinguished Service Medal, the British Distinguished Service Order, and the French Legion of Honor for his World War I service.

=== "Gorrell's History" ===
In February 1918 the War Department in Washington, D.C., created an Historical Branch on the General Staff to begin the process of documenting the Army's participation in World War I. Simultaneously the AEF set up its own historical unit at its headquarters in Chaumont. In May the effort reached down to lower levels of the AEF when its Services of Supply (formerly named "Lines of Communication" and "Zone of the Interior") in Tours created an historical records section. As part of the SOS, the Air Service delegated its portion of the task to its Chief of Information, Capt. Ernest LaRue Jones, publisher of the magazine Aeronautics in civilian life. Jones was only able to devote a staff of five men to the program while combat continued, but he did create a small unit to produce, collect, and preserve a photographic record of Air Service activities.

In the two weeks immediately following the Armistice, the Chief of Staff of the Air Service, First Army, Lt. Col. William C. Sherman, compiled an extensive document collection of the operations of its tactical units and submitted it to the commanding general of the First Army, with a copy submitted to the final Chief of Air Service, AEF, Major General Mason Patrick. Gorrell recognized in Sherman's work a vital need for a much larger project encompassing the Air Service as a whole, identifying the tactical lessons learned and providing an institutional memory for future war planning and appropriations. He persuaded Patrick to undertake the historic project and Sherman's "history" provided the necessary shape the information was to take. Sherman's headquarters and Jones' activity in Tours renewed efforts to collect information from units and organizations, making submission of the material a requirement before their units could return to the United States. To coordinate and supervise the collection of the information, on December 4, 1918, Patrick created the position of Assistant Chief of Staff based in Paris and appointed Gorrell to fill it, in effect making him the "chief historian" of the Air Service, AEF.

Patrick issued Gorrell instructions on December 12 to produce a "Final Report" to be sent to Pershing, including statistical summaries. Gorrell selected a former fighter pilot and writer, 1st Lt. Charles B. Nordhoff, to be editor-in-chief of the Final Report. On January 6, 1919, Gorrell moved the entire project to Tours, where he could use the 70-man Information Section of the SOS to begin the laborious filing process. Two days later he held a conference in which he integrated both Jones' and Sherman's projects into his own. Jones supervised nearly 100 persons in assembling, indexing, and binding the documents and photographs as they came in, and an editorial board of 30 was set up to provide material to Nordhoff for inclusion in the Final Report. In Chaumont, Sherman was assigned to write a Tactical History describing the Air Service's combat operations, assisted by a staff of 13. In all, by February 5, 1919, more than 250 personnel were directly engaged in the production of the history.

The Final Report of Chief of Air Service emerged as a document of 252 pages, 134 of them narrative and 56 of supporting photographs, charts, tables, and maps. Two years after it was written it was published for Air Service use and in 1948 it was included in the Army Historical Division's massive history of the AEF. Sherman's Tactical History, submitted to Pershing on February 14, 1919, came to 158 pages. Both documents were edited for style before being sent on to the War Department, but not for content. By the time of completion of the entire work, officially the History of the Air Service AEF but popularly known as "Gorrell's History," it had become 282 bound volumes including two for indexes. These were organized into 18 general categories in lettered series, A through R. It was shipped to the War Department in the summer of 1919 to be the source material for definitive historical narratives on each of its categories, but that work was never begun because of a lack of funding. "Gorrell's History" was finally moved from a vault in the Munitions Building, where it had resided since 1919, to the National Archives in 1961. (Note: Jones resumed his civilian career as an aviation writer but returned to staff duty as a lieutenant colonel with the Army Air Forces during World War II. Sherman, a Regular officer and 1910 graduate of West Point whose branch was the Corps of Engineers, was assigned to the Air Service Operations and Training Group in March 1919, reduced by demobilization to his permanent establishment rank of major, and instructed at the Air Service Tactical School and the Command and General Staff College. He died in 1927 after a protracted illness at the age of 39.)

=== Post-war assignments ===
In March 1919 Gorrell accompanied Patrick to an aviation commission of 12 Allied nations assembled in Paris to write a convention regulating international aerial navigation, as both his technical adviser and fellow delegate. Gorrell (along with Bolling) had also been a delegate in 1917 to the contentious, four-nation "Inter-Allied Aeronautical Commission" and was familiar with all the preliminary discussions. Each of the five main Allied powers (Note: Besides the United States, these nations were Great Britain, France, Italy, and Japan.) to the 1919 conference brought two delegates and submitted a draft convention. Soon after its first meeting the 1919 commission was also made an advisory body on aviation matters to the Supreme Council at the Paris Peace Conference. Although neither Gorrell nor Patrick was present at the finale in October and the United States did not become a signatory, the commission resulted in the Paris Convention of 1919.

Following the signing of the Treaty of Versailles, Gorrell returned to the United States in July 1919 for duty in Washington, D.C., with the Advisory Board, Air Service. The board of six field grade officers had been created in the March 13, 1919 reorganization of the Air Service to advise the director of the Air Service, like Patrick a non-aviator major general, on technical matters. This assignment lasted only from July 19 to September 8, 1919, when his five-year association with the Air Service ended and he was assigned to the War Plans Division of the General Staff.

In the month preceding his transfer, controversy had enveloped the Air Service, some of it along politically partisan lines, as a select committee of the Republican-controlled Congress investigated the deplorable record of U.S. wartime aircraft production. At the same time bills had been introduced in both houses that would remove military aviation from the Army and Navy and create an independent air force. (Note: The bills were introduced by Senator Harry New of Indiana and Representative Charles F. Curry of California, both Republicans, following the recommendations of a fact-finding commission led by Assistant Secretary of War Benedict Crowell that contradicted Army boards created by the General Staff to oppose an independent air force. The Army used the political clout of Secretary of War Newton Baker and the prestige of General Pershing to put down the independence movement. Even so, Pershing's testimony displayed sympathy with the goals of the airmen to an extent that he was virtually cross-examined to elicit the Army's position. (Tate 1998, pp. 12-13)) Strong public and congressional support had rallied behind Billy Mitchell in favor of the bills. The Army's hierarchy vigorously opposed the movement and created the Menoher Board of four artillery generals (Note: Maj. Gen. Charles T. Menoher chaired the board, composed of himself and major generals Frank W. Coe, William G. Haan, and William J. Snow, but he was also director of the Air Service.) to articulate its position and counter the popular and flamboyant Mitchell.

Gorrell was immediately assigned by the Army to assist Director of War Plans and Menoher Board member Maj. Gen. William G. Haan in formulating their stance, which also deprived the airmen of one of their most articulate exponents at the same time. (Note: The index of his testimony before the Frear Committee lists him as "Colonel, Infantry, Regular". His colonel's commission was neither in the Infantry nor as a Regular, and were this the case, Gorrell likely would not have resigned from the Army in 1920. (War Expenditure Hearings, Volume 3 Serial 4, p. 2705)) Gorrell's appearance in August 1919 with Patrick before the Frear Committee (Note: Chaired by Congressman James A. Frear, the committee was officially the House of Representatives' "Subcommittee No. 1 (Aviation), Select Committee on Expenditures in the War Department, 66th Congress, First Session".) while still a member of the advisory board, to refute erroneous and polemic allegations made during earlier testimony, was well-remarked, but his second round of testimony on October 27, 1919, in which he returned to read into the record the just-issued report of the Menoher Board, is largely overlooked. In addition to putting forth the Army's arguments, the report bluntly opposed any independent role for the Air Service and averred that it could never become more than an auxiliary branch of the Army.

By January 1920 reprints made in the press at the height of debate over Senator New's independent air force bill attributed the Army's statement to Gorrell personally. If Gorrell was in fact opposed to any autonomy for the Air Service, he made no public statements or writings regarding his personal position after an initial endorsement of the report's contents during his testimony. Shortly after, in the wave of officer demotions to permanent grade then underway (his would be back to captain), Gorrell concluded that despite demonstrated loyalty to the General Staff he was not to be among the favored few officers who would be permitted to retain their wartime high rank and abruptly left the Army.

== Businessman ==
Gorrell resigned his commission on March 19, 1920, (Note: Gorrell quipped that "I put my own resignation through in 28 hours" after submitting it. (USMA Class of 1912 Ten Year Book, pp. 49-50)) only six weeks after his 29th birthday. He gave no reason other than he felt he had achieved the highest position possible in the Army at a young age and would face the tedium of a long climb back to that position (and without comparable compensation) if he remained in the peacetime service. He joined the Nordyke and Marmon Company's automobile manufacturing subsidiary in May 1920 as the manager of its Department of Sales Extension in Indianapolis, Indiana, at a wage of only $25.00 a week. (Note: Howard Marmon, founder and president of the subsidiary, had worked with Gorrell in Europe in 1917 when both were members of the Bolling Mission.) By February 1924 he had risen to a vice president in the company and was in Boston, Massachusetts. In September 1925 he accepted a vice presidency with the Stutz Motor Car Company and became its president on January 25, 1929. He remained with the company until August 1935, serving as chairman of the board.

In March 1935 Gorrell incorporated the Edgar S. Gorrell Investment Company in California to promote the mass housing construction market in Los Angeles and left Stutz in August to devote himself full-time to the venture. In 1941, while president of ATA, he helped found and was president of the Air Cargo, Inc. consortium.

== ATA president ==
While still with Stutz, Gorrell was drawn back into aviation by being named to a special committee of seven civilians (Note: Gorrell and two other notable veterans of the Air Service, Jimmy Doolittle and Clarence Chamberlin, were chosen for the committee when Charles Lindbergh and Orville Wright declined to serve.) and five military men chaired by former Secretary of War Baker that was formed to investigate the Air Corps in the wake of the "Airmail Scandal." The "Baker Board" convened at the Army War College on April 17, 1934, to review the work of more than a dozen prior aviation boards, interview more than 100 witnesses, and solicit suggestions for improving the Air Corps from more than 500 of its 1,400 officers. (Note: Gorrell was one of three members of Baker Board characterized as an advocate for the Air Corps (the other two were Doolittle and Air Corps chief Maj. Gen. Benjamin Foulois), but of the three, he alone concurred with the rest of the board in recommending that the role of the Air Corps remain limited to "auxiliary support" of the ground forces as advocated by the Army's general staff.) Before the Baker Board issued its report to the public on July 23, 1934, Congress passed the Air Mail Act of June 12, 1934, one of the provisions of which was creation of the Federal Aviation Commission under the Department of Commerce to scrutinize all aspects of aviation, not just military. One of the main focuses of the commission, chaired by the editor of the Atlanta Constitution, Clark Howell, was the fledgling and unregulated American air transport industry, whose alleged misconduct (Note: The April 1935 issue of Flying Magazine (p. 231) noted that the Howell Commission conducted the 20th investigation of the airlines. However, in 1941 the United States Court of Claims found that there had not been any fraud or collusion in the awarding of air mail contracts to the airlines. (Smithsonian National Postal Museum, "1934 Airmail Scandal")) was at the core of the airmail scandal.

After the cancellation of its airmail contracts, the airline industry underwent a drastic shake-up and emerged in late 1934 and throughout 1935 with new leadership but countless pressing problems, the most serious of which was its poor economic condition. Fourteen scheduled air carriers decided to leave the manufacturer-dominated Aeronautical Chamber of Commerce and form the Air Transport Association of America with its headquarters in Chicago, Illinois. Gorrell was invited to be its first president. (Note: The committee selecting Gorrell consisted of Eddie Rickenbacker (Eastern Air Lines), William A. Patterson (United Airlines), C.R. Smith (American Airlines), and Jack Frye (TWA).) He dropped his California housing venture and assumed his new role on January 14, 1936. In introducing himself to the press, Gorrell predicted four improvements in the industry by 1938: standardization of aircraft, the introduction of four-engined transports capable of speeds of 250 mph, new safety equipment, and trans-Atlantic passenger service. Although the last did not begin until June 1939 and four-engined transports were not put into general service until 1940, Gorrell's vision immediately put the ATA on a "paying basis" with the industry. Gorrell appeared before hearings of the Copeland Committee on airline safety in February 1936 and his pledge of immediate improvement in safety began to be fulfilled when on December 31, 1936, he announced that the Bureau of Air Commerce had allocated ten million dollars of its appropriations to finance a system of radio marker beacon stations along scheduled airline routes.

Gorrell was expected by airline executives to become a "czar" for civil aviation in the manner of Will Hays in the Hollywood movie industry or Judge Kenesaw Mountain Landis in professional baseball. However, Gorrell quickly perceived that any such undertaking was legally impossible and would be a serious political and business mistake. For any particular step that would benefit the industry Gorrell usually eschewed open espousal of the action, preferring to work behind scenes instead and call upon selected airline executives to advocate the move. He adopted much the same method dealing with Congress, Federal regulatory departments. and the military. (Note: In March 1937 Senator Royal S. Copeland proposed mobilizing the airlines during summer maneuvers as a test of its possible use in the 1936 revision of the Army's 1922 mobilization plan. When the GHQ Air Force decided to follow through with the suggestion during the Northeast Maneuvers of 1938, Gorrell was asked to analyze the plan and found that it would result in a loss of seven days of commercial operations and cost the taxpayers over $5 million. Rather than antagonize Copeland, who made the suggestion based on discussions with Gorrell during his committee hearings, he advised Chief of the Air Corps Maj. Gen. Oscar Westover of his findings, who had the proposal quietly shelved. (Crackel, pp. 7-8)) Gorrell became a proponent of strong government regulation of the airline industry as a means of promoting its growth by protecting existing carriers from "cut-throat" competition, as well as improving safety. The Civil Aeronautics Act of 1938 was lobbied for by members of the industry to restrict new competition and control trade practices. (Note: The characterization of Gorrell as ATA president is not entirely laudatory. The Air Line Pilots Association was still in its infancy as a pilots' union and its relationship with ATA and Gorrell was adversarial. Its history of its first 50 years is cool toward him in general, particularly regarding the role ascribed to him in passage of the Civil Aeronautics Act, and flatly states that ATA and Gorrell not only adamantly opposed what ALPA considers the prime instrument responsible for airline safety improvement, the Air Safety Board, but helped destroy the ASB in 1940. (Hopkins, pp. 92 and 105-106))

“Beyond doubt, the scheduled air transport industry has influenced and stimulated many of our other national industries. Our military air force is as dependent on commercial aeronautics as our Navy is upon our Merchant Marine.”
Edgar S. Gorrell, 14 January 1937 speech to the Boston Chamber of Commerce

One of his first tasks after accepting the ATA presidency, (Note: Gorrell first put forth his war plan proposal when he appeared before a Senate subcommittee investigating airline safety in February 1936.) fearing that in the wake of the air mail scandal the government might nationalize the air transport industry during a national emergency as it had the railroads in World War I, was a campaign to persuade the War Department to develop a plan for the use of civil air transport in such event, which became a continuing priority for Gorrell throughout his term as ATA president. Within a few days the War Department requested that the joint Aeronautical Board study the issue and develop a policy to benefit both the Army and the Navy.

A few months later, using a draft copy of the Aeronautical Board's study, Chief of the Air Corps Maj. Gen. Oscar Westover calculated the transport requirements for mobilization and found that the Air Corps lacked at least 200 transports needed for the first 120 days, and that the airlines only had sufficient aircraft to fill a third of that shortfall. The Aeronautical Board issued its report in February 1937 and specifically counseled against a military takeover of the airlines, instead recommending that a civilian "Federal Coordinator" be designated to control and coordinate their operations to eliminate duplication of effort. Airline personnel should likewise be deferred from military service to perform the tasks asked of the carriers.

In May 1937 the War Department issued a revision of the existing Industrial Mobilization Plan, first formulated in 1922, that was lacking in detail and lumped the airlines together with all other forms of transportation. Gorrell responded by writing drafts of what he termed "a structure of action" for the airlines and worked confidentially with C.R. Smith of American Airlines, William A. Patterson of United Airlines and Jack Frye of TWA to ensure its smooth implementation.

By April 1938 he had not only persuaded most military leaders of both services that nationalization would be a mistake, but had satisfactorily demonstrated how the airlines could integrate themselves into a strategic contingency while maintaining their autonomy, by limiting competition among them during the emergency and using government contracts to support the war effort. Comprehensive plans were in place and revised monthly in the War Department, the Air Corps, and the ATA by the time war broke out in Europe on September 1, 1939,

=== Role of the airlines in World War II ===
Immediately after the news of the Japanese attack on Pearl Harbor went public, Western Airlines responded to a request to move ammunition to units without it along the Pacific Coast. Other carriers followed the example within hours and on December 11 Gorrell cabled both Chief of the Army Air Forces Lt. Gen. Henry H. Arnold and Army Chief of Staff Gen. George C. Marshall that the airlines were performing their assigned functions in the plans. Nevertheless, President Roosevelt's initial impulse was to nationalize the scheduled air carriers and on December 13 he issued Executive Order 8974 to take control of the airlines. (Note: EO 8974 authorized the Secretary of War to "take possession and assume control of any civil aviation system, or systems, or any part thereof, to the extent necessary for the successful prosecution of the war." (Executive Order 8974, "Control of Civil Aviation", Dec. 13, 1941, Federal Register 6 FR 6441, Dec. 17, 1941)) Gorrell was aware that airline responsiveness was crucial to forestalling nationalization and promptly provided aircraft and crews at the first strategic request, made to ATA the same day. (Note: The first invocation of the order was to have been the movement of a provisional battalion of U.S. Marines from Quantico, Virginia, to neutral Brazil as a security force for airfields at Natal, Recife, and Belém, but Gorrell immediately provided 12 transports from American Airlines before the Marine force was even assembled.) The next day, while a deal was being brokered with Assistant Secretary of War for Air Robert A. Lovett to turn over voluntarily more than half the airlines' aircraft (Note: In December 1941 the airlines were operating 289 DC-3s and 100 lighter two-engine transports. 200 were allocated at the meeting to the Air Transport Command, but in May 1942 the number retained by the airlines was finalized at 155 DC-3s and 10 Lockheed Lodestars. (Orencic p. 51 and Craven and Cate Vol VIII p. 21, footnote 44)) and crews to the AAF Ferrying Command (ACFC) on a contract basis, (Note: Lovett convened a special conference of AAF, Navy, government and industry executives on December 14, 1941, to allocate then-limited transport resources. Airline contracts with the AAF took the form of purchase (early in the war) or lease of the aircraft by the AAF and payment to the airlines for their crews to operate them, including on overseas routes. During 1942 88% of all AAF transport operations worldwide were conducted by the airlines under contract, and 65% in 1943. Domestically the total was 100% for both years. Beginning in 1944 ATC crews and planes became available and domestic flights were phased out with some carriers released from their contracts. (Craven and Cate Vol. VII, p. 31)) the promised transports arrived at their staging points.

The executive order was not revoked, however, and Gorrell moved ATA's headquarters to Washington, D.C. His foresight and wariness were proven sound when the AAF reacted to early Axis success worldwide by using the EO to attempt transfer of the Civil Aeronautics Administration to the Army Air Forces. Although the main purpose of the move was to bring the Civilian Pilot Training Program under the military, it would also have the effect of passing to the AAF regulatory control of the airlines. Brigadier General Donald H. Connolly was recalled to active duty in January 1942 from his civilian position as CAA administrator and made Military Director of Civil Aviation (MDCA) with the explicit purpose of carrying out EO 8974. (Note: Connolly was not an airman but a career officer in the Corps of Engineers. As a lieutenant colonel he had been in charge of the WPA in Southern California in 1935 when Arnold commanded the 1st Wing at March Field. After a brief term as MDCA he commanded the Persian Gulf Command with distinction.) The MDCA took Gorrell with a six-man ATA liaison staff into the AAF Office of Civil Aviation on an unpaid advisory basis, tasked to establish travel priorities and prepare a system for the mass movement of troops within the Western Hemisphere and to Hawaii using civil carriers.

The plan was unworkable, however, because it was drawn up as an "on-demand" operation. Before it was fully implemented, Arnold ordered the commander of ACFC, Maj. Gen. Robert Olds, to take "complete military control over all parts of your operation." On February 18, 1942, all overseas contracts except those in the western hemisphere were cancelled and their associated civil operations (primarily those of Pan American) were militarized. (Note: Pan Am was targeted because its transports were already in place overseas and its trans-Africa route to the Middle East was considered vital. (Craven and Cate, Vol VIII, p.54)) The AAF had neither sufficient resources nor expertise, however, and C.R. Smith, now a colonel in the AAF, was appointed second-in-command of ACFC in April. (Note: Olds had just been replaced in command of ACFC by Brig. Gen. Harold L. George after suffering a heart attack that led to his early death in 1943.) He brought ideas and extensive transport experience to the transport command, which its senior officers did not have, developing a workable long-range plan to maintain the civil status of airline operations before further militarization took place. (Note: Smith was critical of Gorrell's planning efforts, minimizing them before, during, and following the war. He had a polarizing personality, however, and was alone in his criticisms. His motivations for the criticisms, whether honestly held, politically motivated, chafing at their professional relationship, or a rival for credit in preserving the industry, are unclear. (Crackel p. 50 note 69)) In the meantime Secretary of War Henry L. Stimson opposed the attempt to subsume the CAA into the AAF and honored Lovett's agreement with the airlines not to invoke EO 8974. In August 1942, along with Secretary of the Navy Frank Knox, he put the nationalization issue to rest by writing Secretary of Commerce Jesse H. Jones that the CAA would conduct its war support activities as a civilian agency.

Throughout the pre-war years Gorrell had linked the purpose of the ATA to national defense, going so far as to post the concept in the association's letterhead, and his war plan for the use of civil air transport parallels that of his plan for strategic air bombardment in that it soon became accepted as elementary doctrine. In 1952 the Civil Reserve Air Fleet was created to establish a permanent system for use of the airlines in times of national emergency. Gorrell's achievements as president of ATA were four-fold: the Civil Aeronautics Act of 1938 that provided civil aviation a secure economic base, development of a system of air navigation radio facilities in the United States and Alaska, preparation of a war plan for the utilization of the airlines, and the use of government contracts with the airlines to provide worldwide transportation during World War II. The ATA honors his legacy by annually awarding the "Edgar S. Gorrell Award" for outstanding contributions toward aviation safety.

== Notes ==
Footnotes

Citations
