= Redler =

Redler is a German surname. Notable people with the surname include:

- Arnold Redler (1875–1958), British founder of the conveying company Redler Limited in Stroud (Gloucestershire) in 1920
- Harold Redler (1897–1918), British World War I flying ace
- Leon Redler (born 1936), doctor of medicine, psychiatrist, psychotherapist, and teacher of the Alexander Technique
- Lucy Redler (born 1979), a German politician

== See also ==
- Redler
- Rädler
