= Harold Redler =

British World War I flying ace

Harold Bolton Redler
- Born: 27 January 1897; West Monkton, Somerset, England
- Died: 21 June 1918 (aged 21); Turnberry, Ayrshire, Scotland
- Burial place: Church of St Augustine, West Monkton, Somerset, England; 51°3′2.5″N 3°3′10″W
- Relatives: Arnold Redler (uncle)
- Military career
- Allegiance: United Kingdom
- Branch: British Army; Royal Air Force
- Rank: Lieutenant
- Units: No. 40 Squadron RFC; No. 24 Squadron RAF
- Conflicts: World War I • Western Front
- Awards: Military Cross

Lieutenant Harold Bolton Redler MC (27 January 1897 – 21 June 1918) was a British World War I flying ace credited with ten aerial victories. His most notable triumph was over a leading German ace, Adolf von Tutschek, whom he killed in action.

== Early life and family ==
Harold Bolton Redler was born in West Monkton, Somerset, the eldest son of Daniel Bolton Redler and Annie Pethick (née Crocker). Redler's grandfather Thomas John Redler, was a grain merchant and miller. Around 1900 Daniel and his brother Arnold broke away from the family business to form their own company Daniel Redler & Co. Ltd., initially at the City Flour Mill, Worcester, but then moved to Sharpness, Gloucestershire, in 1909. The brothers later went their separate ways; with Arnold inventing a system of handling bulk materials, and later founding the Redler company, now part of the Schenck Process Group, while Daniel relocated to South Africa, where he was a founder and director of the Tiger Oats & National Milling Co. Ltd., now Tiger Brands. Harold's parents were resident in Moorreesburg, South Africa, at the time of his death.

== World War I ==
Redler left South Africa at the end of 1915 to travel to England and enlist in the Royal Flying Corps. On 2 February 1917, from cadet, he was commissioned as a temporary second lieutenant (on probation) on the General List for duty with the RFC. On 9 April 1917, Redler was appointed a flying officer, and was confirmed in his rank on 3 May.

He was posted to No. 40 Squadron in northern France, flying a Nieuport 23 single-seat fighter, and became a balloon buster with his first aerial victory on 7 May 1917. He would score twice more in June and July, driving down two Albatros D.IIIs. He then transferred to No. 24 Squadron, flying a S.E.5a fighter. He began his tenure with them with his greatest feat. On 15 March 1918, Redler was leading four other No. 24 Squadron pilots on patrol. He passed to the east of a westward bound patrol of six German aircraft—three Albatros fighters and three Fokker triplanes. With the sun behind them, the British patrol dove upon a surprised sextet of Germans from Jasta 12. Redler fired at the highest flying of the triplanes, pressing his attack to a near-collision while pumping 40 rounds into its cockpit. The triplane stalled in flight, falling off to the right and spiralling down out of the dogfight into a forced landing. Redler claimed an "out of control" victory over it. However, Tutschek had apparently been rendered insensible during the fight, and was found dead in his landed aircraft under puzzling circumstances. Redler had killed one of Germany's leading aces. Redler ran off a string of six more victories by 20 April. The following day, he was wounded in action. He was relieved from his combat posting and returned to England.

Redler was posted to the No.1 School of Aerial Fighting and Gunnery, based at the golf course at Turnberry, Ayrshire, Scotland. There, on 21 June 1918, Redler and Captain Ian Henderson took off in Airco DH.9 No. D1018, to test the Lewis gun. However their aircraft crashed, and both men were killed. Redler's Military Cross was gazetted the same day. His citation read:

Temporary Second Lieutenant Harold Bolton Redler, General List and RFC

"For conspicuous gallantry and devotion to duty. He encountered four enemy two-seater machines, and attacking the lowest drove it to the ground with its engine damaged. Later, he attacked one of five enemy two-seater machines, and drove it down out of control. He has destroyed in all three enemy machines and driven three others down out of control. He continually attacked enemy troops and transport from a low altitude during operations, and showed splendid qualities of courage and determination throughout."

Redler is buried at the cemetery of the Church of St Augustine, West Monkton, Somerset, England.

== List of aerial victories ==
Combat record
No.	Date/time	Aircraft/ Serial No.	Opponent	Result	Location	Notes
1	7 May 1917 @ 0935 hours	Nieuport 23 (B1640)	Observation balloon	Destroyed	North of Henin-Liétard, France	
2	7 June 1917 @ 1100 hours	Nieuport 23 (B1558)	Albatros D.III	Driven down out of control	Northeast of Ypres, Belgium	
3	14 July 1917 @ 0650 hours	Nieuport 23 (B1558)	Albatros D.III	Driven down out of control	East of Douai, France	
4	15 March 1918 @ 1030 hours	SE.5a (B79)	Fokker Dr.I	Driven down out of control	Prémontré, France	Adolf Ritter von Tutschek killed in action
5	18 March 1918 @ 1140 hours	SE.5a (B7824)	German reconnaissance aircraft	Driven down out of control	Villers-le-Sec, Aisne, France	Victory shared with Bernard Paul Gascoigne Beanlands
6	23 March 1918 @ 1650 hours	SE.5a (B7824)	German reconnaissance aircraft	Captured	South of Berlancourt, Aisne, France	
7	24 March 1918 @ 1010 hours	SE.5a (B7824)	Rumpler reconnaissance aircraft	Destroyed	Pithon, France	
8	26 March 1918 @ 0930 hours	SE.5a (C1081)	Rumpler reconnaissance aircraft	Destroyed by fire	Estrées-Barleux, France	
9	12 April 1918 @ 1615 hours	SE.5a (D275)	Albatros D.V	Destroyed	Hangard-Moreuil, France	
10	20 April 1918 @ 1015 hours	SE.5a (D275)	Pfalz D.III	Driven down out of control	Bayonvillers, France	
