= Raynal Bolling =

United States Army officer

Raynal Cawthorne Bolling
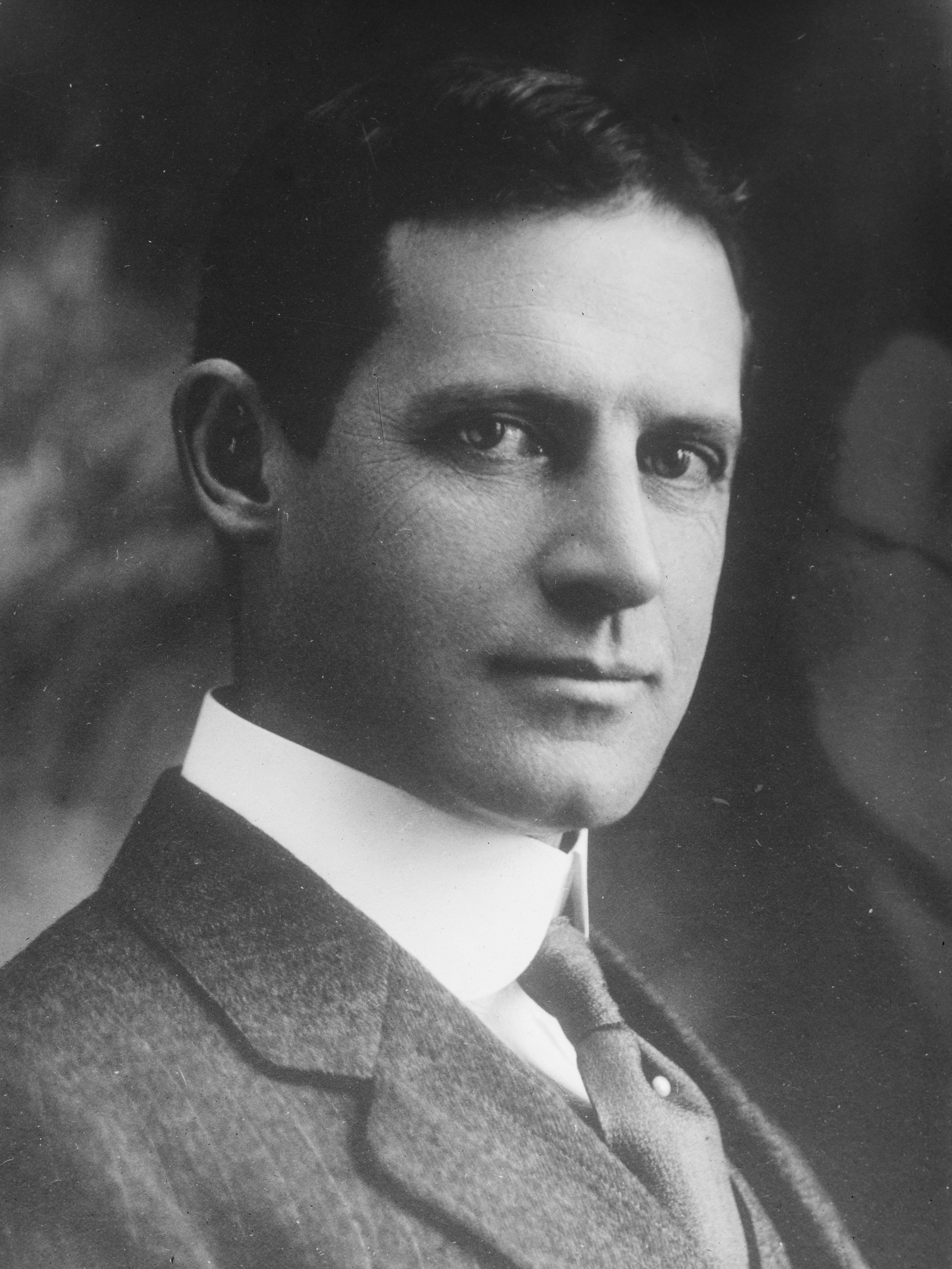
- Bolling in 1918
- Born: September 1, 1877; Hot Springs, Arkansas, U.S.
- Died: March 26, 1918 (aged 40); Estrées-Deniécourt, France
- Military career
- Allegiance: United States of America
- Branch: National Guard, New York; Aviation Section, U.S. Signal Corps
- Service years: 1915–1918
- Rank: Colonel
- Conflicts: World War I
- Awards: Army Distinguished Service Medal; Legion of Honour

Raynal Cawthorne Bolling (Note: The given name "Raynal" is pronounced as in "canal.") (September 1, 1877 – March 26, 1918) was the first high-ranking officer of the United States Army to be killed in combat in World War I. A corporate lawyer by vocation, he became an early Army aviator and the organizer of both of the first units in what ultimately became the Air National Guard and the Air Force Reserve Command.

Sent to France to lay a foundation for the Air Service of the American Expeditionary Force as head of what became known as the "Bolling Mission," he remained in France instead of returning to the United States, served briefly in a number of staff positions and was selected for a future combat command. He was touring his future area of operations to learn the nature of the work he would be expected to perform when he was killed in action by German troops during the opening days of the 1918 spring offensive. He was the namesake of Bolling Air Force Base.

== Biography ==
Bolling was born in Hot Springs, Arkansas, and was a resident of Greenwich, Connecticut, from 1911 until 1915. In 1912, he commissioned Carrère and Hastings, the architects of the New York Public Library, to build an estate for him at 137 Doubling Road in Greenwich that he later named Greyledge. Greyledge was constructed between 1912 and 1914. Greyledge was an English-style manor situated on an estate that sprawls from 137 Doubling Road to Boulder Brook. In addition to a sitting room, family room, library and thirteen fireplaces, the estate was also home to a shooting gallery. Upon completion in 1914 Colonel Raynal Bolling and Anna Tucker Phillips Bolling moved in to Greyledge with their family of four daughters and one son. However, Bolling spent virtually no time enjoying his family and new home. In November 1915, Bolling, then a First Lieutenant in the Air Force, was appointed to the New York National Guard. The estate was later razed, in 2007, by its current owner despite a public outcry. He attended the Penn Charter School in Philadelphia, graduating in 1896. He graduated from Harvard College in the class of 1900 and from the Harvard Law School in 1902.

Bolling was an attorney at Guthrie, Cravath, and Henderson. A little after a year there he began his career in the legal department of the United States Steel Corporation. By 1907 he was assistant general solicitor and married Anna Tucker Phillips, June 25, 1907, in Beverly, Massachusetts. She was the sister of William Phillips, a prominent career diplomat. He also joined the New York National Guard. He and his wife had four daughters and a son, one of whom, Cecelia Raynal Bolling, died in infancy. In 1913 he was named general counsel of US Steel at the age of 36.

== Military service ==
=== National guard aviation pioneer ===
In the summer of 1915 Bolling, along with his brother-in-law and seven New York businessmen, all members of the American Aero Club, began taking flying lessons on property owned by the Wright Company near Garden City, New York. They contracted with an aviation school operated by Edson and Herbert Gallaudet for the use of their Gallaudet C-2 dual-controls trainer, which had a 50-horsepower Gnome motor, and the services of 20-year-old Peter Carl "Tex" Millman as an instructor. By the end of July, Millman reported several of his students including Bolling were ready to try for their American Aero Club license.

Bolling was in sympathy with the objectives of the Preparedness Movement, a group of influential Americans advocating military preparedness for involvement in World War I and drawn primarily from wealthy lawyers, bankers, academics, and politicians of the Northeast. Starting August 10, he was a participant in the first "Business Men's Camp", a volunteer summer military training camp organized and funded by the Preparedness Movement in Plattsburgh, New York, with the encouragement of Major General Leonard Wood, commanding the Army's Eastern Department. There he organized a "motor machine gun troop" and arranged for Millman to fly Gallaudet's C-2, re-engined with a 100-horsepower Gnome and termed the "Military Tractor," from the camp to demonstrate its military usefulness. Despite a long delay caused by lack of a safe landing ground nearby, Millman made 20 flights over a three-day period. Bolling also arranged for use of the American Aero Club's six-person balloon, the America III, to make a demonstration for the trainees.

In September, after the Plattsburgh encampment was over, Bolling began preparations for organizing an aero company for the guard. He secured the services of three additional flying instructors (Note: One of the instructors was a fellow guardsman, Lieutenant Alexander Blair Thaw II, whose brother William Thaw was then flying with the Lafayette Escadrille.) and began recruiting personnel. He received $12,500 in funding from the Aero Club of America (ACA) (Note: The American Aero Club had instituted a subscription fund, called the "National Aeroplane Fund," in May 1915 to "develop aviation corps for the militia" after the apparent success of similar efforts in Europe. The earmarks for the 1st Aero Company eventually grew to $59,000.) The funds provided Bolling were donated anonymously by two wealthy New Yorkers, including William K. Vanderbilt, specifically to establish a unit for the NY Guard. and rented both the "Military Tractor" and Gallaudet's earlier prototype, the C-1. Authorization to form an aviation section in the Signal Corps of the Guard was announced by New York Governor Charles S. Whitman in October, and Bolling, who had just completed his flying instruction, was then appointed to the ACA's special committee to support its implementation.

In November 1915, Bolling was appointed as a first lieutenant in the New York National Guard and organized the "Aviation Detachment, First Battalion Signal Corps, National Guard, New York." During the winter of 1915-1916, when it reached its authorized strength of four officers and 40 enlisted men, the detachment was designated the "1st Aero Company" and was the first national guard aviation unit in the United States. (Note: Although several naval militia units had announced themselves as "organized," none had aircraft and only one had pilots, whereas the 1st Aero Company had both.) The pilots of the company were prominent young New Yorkers, many of whom had already had some flight instruction over the summer. Within a month, half of the 48 states had applied to the ACA for financial assistance in purchasing aircraft and equipment.

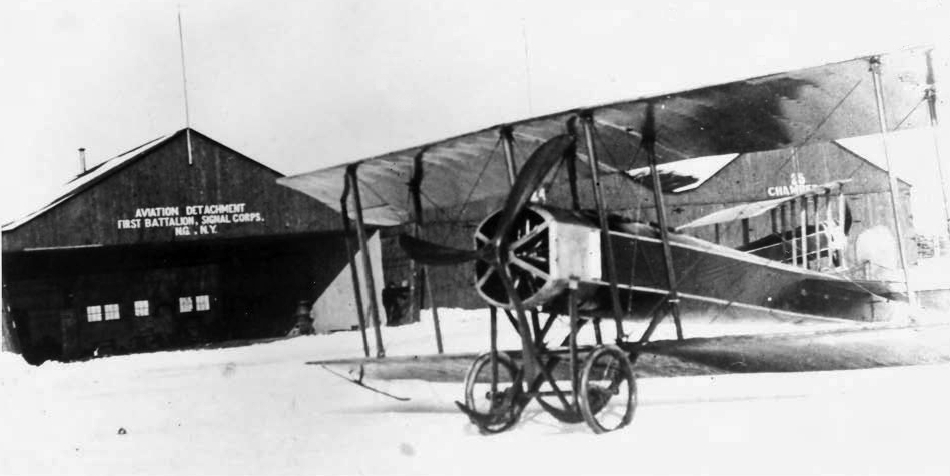
The Gallaudet "Military Tractor" used by the Aviation Detachment at Garden City

Flying instruction began immediately at Garden City Aerodrome, with 56 flights in November alone. Throughout the winter of 1915-1916 the 1st Aero Company conducted flying operations, but by April continuing bad weather and engine problems slowed progress in training. The company returned its rented trainers to Gallaudet and acquired five more of disparate manufacture and age, including purchase of a Curtiss JN-4 "Jenny". In addition, the company attended weekly classes in aircraft engines and the theory of aviation at the Columbia School Of Engineering.

The company, commanded by now-Captain Bolling, was mustered into federal service on July 13, 1916, and began a five-week encampment. The Army opened the "Signal Corps Aviation Station, Mineola" at the Garden City Aerodrome on July 22 and the 1st Aero Company received regulation training from two regulars, 1st Lieutenants Joseph E. Carberry and Walter G. Kilner, both veterans of the Punitive expedition in Mexico with the 1st Aero Squadron. On August 1 the aviation school received the first of forty new aircraft to be delivered over the next eight months, most of them Curtiss Jennies, authorization to buy fuel, and to hire three civilian instructors and seven mechanics as staff. In addition to the 1st Aero Company, the newly formed 2nd Aero Company NYNG also arrived for training (but was not federalized or subject to Carberry's orders), as did 14 officers from the guards of other states, all of which enabled the company to train as a unit. Bolling passed a flying test for an expert pilot's license on October 25, receiving Fédération Aéronautique Internationale certificate No. 536, and passed the Reserve Military Aviator (RMA) qualification test.

Intended for service in Mexico, the 1st Aero Company never left Long Island but did train 25 of its own members as pilots before mustering out of federal service in November 1916. It is recognized as the Air National Guard's oldest unit and its lineage is carried by the 102d Rescue Squadron, New York ANG. The increasing numbers of Army aircraft at Mineola enabled the company to continue flying even after it returned to the jurisdiction of the national guard.

At the same time as these events involving Bolling's unit, a parallel private pilot training program was underway. After American troops under General John J. Pershing entered Mexico in March 1916, a group of wealthy New Yorkers underwrote another school at nearby Fort Jay in New York City. The organizer was attorney Phillip A. Carroll, who had been one of the nine men trained by Millman the previous summer. Called the Governors Island Training Corps, the small group of candidates began instruction on May 2. They trained daily under the authority of and in conformance with regulations set down by General Wood with the goal of passing the RMA test and being commissioned in the new aviation section of the Signal Reserve Corps. (Note: Passed June 3, 1916, the National Defense Act provided for an additional 296 officers and 2,000 men in the Signal Corps specifically for the aviation section.) Ultimately 17 men participated, ten completed the course, and seven including Carroll received ratings and commissions by May 1917.

In its second winter of operations but no longer under federal control, the 1st Aero Company continued training flights in conjunction with the small force of reserve candidates flying from Governors Island. On November 18, 1916, Bolling led a flight of seven Jennies from Mineola to New York harbor, where they were joined by a pair of JN-4s from the Governors Island school. (Note: One Jennie was flown by Carroll and the other by Yale graduate Cord Meyer, who had noted former Princeton football player and fellow trainee Hobey Baker along as an observer. Both were among the seven later commissioned, and served together in France with the 103rd Aero Squadron.) One of Carroll's instructors in his own plane accompanied the group as the ten airplanes flew cross country together to Princeton, New Jersey, to attend the Yale-Princeton football game, the largest such formation of airplanes to date. In one of its final tactical maneuvers, led by Bolling on March 8, 1917, the 1st Aero Company participated in an exercise that involved 25 aircraft and half of the company's 44 personnel, simulating battlefield reconnaissance of camouflaged equipment and fortifications, and smoke from a simulated artillery battery. (Note: Although not a member of the national guard, Tex Millman was one of the company's pilots during the maneuvers. The 22-year-old Millman contracted pneumonia and died on March 21st. Six pilots of the company were his pallbearers, and another 12 flew a formation in the shape of a cross over his burial service. (New York Times, March 22, 1917)) Despite their achievements, Bolling's report to the Chief of the Militia Bureau concluded that the development of national guard aviation was not practical at that time because of difficulties in attracting skilled mechanics into the guard to maintain the aircraft. As a result, and because of a curtailment of federal funding for the project, the War Department decided not to use national guard aero squadrons for service in the war. The 1st Aero Company was disbanded on May 23, 1917.

By that time the United States was at war with Germany. Bolling was called to active duty as a major in the Aviation Section, U.S. Signal Corps on April 27, 1917, "for duty in connection with the organization of the 1st Reserve Aero Squadron," pursuant to authorization of the National Defense Act of 1916. On May 26, 1917, shortly after the national guard company was disbanded, he organized the new 154-man squadron, the first air reserve unit in the United States. The squadron became the 26th Aero Squadron after it deployed to France and had as its cadre the former guardsmen of the 1st Aero Company and the reserve military aviators with whom Bolling had trained in 1916-17. (Note: The 2nd Aero Company NYNG, from Buffalo, New York, provided men for the 2nd Reserve Aero Squadron, organized at the Chandler Field Aviation Station at Essington, Pennsylvania, on July 12, 1917. Its state of training was far less than its predecessor. After its induction, the Army ordered that no other reserve squadrons be formed. The 2nd RAS was redesignated the 45th Aero Squadron, a part of the National Army, and transferred to Gerstner Field, Louisiana, for the remainder of the war.)

=== World War I ===
Before Bolling could actually take command of his unit, he was detached in June 1917 for staff duty. French premier Alexandre Ribot had sent U.S. President Woodrow Wilson a telegram at the end of May urging the United States to contribute 4,500 aircraft; 5,000 pilots; and 50,000 mechanics to the war effort. Because of his legal experience Bolling was assigned to assist in the drafting of legislation to fund the development of military aviation in response to Ribot's proposal. The subsequent Aviation Act (40 Stat. 243), passed July 24, 1917, was the largest single appropriation for a single purpose to that time, $640 million.

In conjunction with that duty, he was also appointed to the advisory Aircraft Production Board of the Council of National Defense to head an aeronautical commission to Europe known as "the Bolling Mission," to represent Secretary of War Newton D. Baker and the Board. His commission consisted of himself, two Army pilots trained in aeronautical engineering at the Massachusetts Institute of Technology, two naval officers, seven civilian industrial experts, and 93 civilian manufacturing technicians. (Note: The Navy members were Naval Constructor George C. Westervelt and engine expert Lieut. Warren G. Child. The seven civilians were Robert Glendenning (a banker), Howard Marmon (an automobile manufacturer), Herbert Hughes (with Packard; an engine authority), C.H. Heilman and H.B. Hurley (metallurgists), R.A. Vail (Dodge Motor Company efficiency expert), and a Mr. Stay (aluminum castings). 18 of the technicians became officers in the Air Service.) The commission was charged with studying the types of military aircraft being used by the Allied Powers, recommend types to be put into production in the United States, and determine what types should be purchased directly from European sources. Bolling was chosen for his business and legal skills in negotiating prices and royalties. The commission left for Europe on June 17, 1917, and arrived in Liverpool on June 26. After a week in London, where its members fanned out to English airfields and aircraft factories, the commission repeated the process in Paris for two weeks, Italy for ten days, and then returned to Paris. Bolling took advantage of his mission's "quasi-diplomatic" status and his brother-in-law's authority as an Assistant Secretary of State to communicate with Washington using the State Department's transatlantic telegraph cable.

Bolling reported to the Chief Signal Officer from Paris on August 15 and recommended that the United States send materials, engines, and parts for assembly of airplanes in Europe. To accelerate the number of American pilots, the report recommended that the best cadets then in ground schools be shipped to France to complete their primary flight training under French instructors. The report further recommended an air force of "fighting airplanes and bombers" well beyond the numbers of airplanes providing auxiliary support of ground forces by observation. In particular Bolling and his Army colleagues, Captains Edgar S. Gorrell and Virginius E. Clark, were impressed by the concept of long-range strategic bombing, influenced by the Italian use of Caproni bombers against Austrian targets. It was one of a number of aircraft the commission recommended for manufacture by American industry, including the Bristol and SPAD VII fighters, but of its recommendations, only the deHavilland DH-4 was suitable for American production methods or engines and thus built in quantity before the war ended. Bolling prepared the preliminary aeronautical contract with the French, calling for delivery of 5,000 airplanes by July 1, 1918, which was signed on August 30, 1917, by the French air minister and General Pershing, now in command of the American Expeditionary Force.

Following his work with the commission, Bolling joined Col. Billy Mitchell's aviation headquarters in Paris, which was still being organized, as Chief, Zone of the Interior, Air Service. On September 3, 1917, Pershing created the Air Service of the American Expeditionary Force and chose Bolling to become Director of Air Service Supply, to administer the Air Service Zone of the Lines of Communication. (Note: In August 1918 the Lines of Communication section was separated from the Paris headquarters, renamed the Service of Supply with an Assistant Chief of Air Service (a brigadier general) in charge, and moved to Tours. Some biographies of Bolling assert that he was "Assistant Chief of Air Service," but his time in the AEF headquarters antedates this position by nine months and the Air Service itself by six.) Bolling was promoted to colonel and his duties were a continuation of those under Mitchell: the supervision of training, the administration of personnel records, the operation of Air Service lines of communication (supply), the activities of the Balloon Division, and the establishment of training schools and air depots for equipment and repair. The most important sections of his new office were those which performed flying training, all balloon activities, and aerial photography units. One of his first tasks was the accelerated construction of a large flying school at Issoudun to provide advanced training to cadets completing their preliminary instruction in France, as he had earlier recommended. (Note: Ironically, after a slow trickle at the start, the numbers of cadets arriving in the autumn of 1917 overwhelmed the inadequate and unprepared French flight schools, causing a backlog by the end of 1917 of more than a thousand untrained flying cadets awaiting instruction. Issoudun was forced to cut back its advanced training to open a primary school to help reduce the backlog. In a further irony, many experienced pilots of the 1st Reserve/26th Aero Squadron were used to fill instructor needs at Issoudun and the primary school at Tours.)

On November 17, 1917, the headquarters of the Air Service AEF underwent a shakeup when its new commander, General Benjamin Foulois, arrived from Washington, D.C., with a large staff and displaced all the existing members. (Note: Foulois' staff numbered 112 officers, all of whom were non-aviators chosen from the General Staff in Washington and many commissioned directly from civilian life. Mitchell called them "carpetbaggers" and considerable internal strife resulted that was not resolved until Pershing directed Maj. Gen. Mason Patrick to take over from Foulois in May 1918. Bolling was a victim of that strife as Foulois thought him inexperienced in handling large organizations, disregarding his extensive business and legal experience with U.S. Steel, and was critical of his use of State Department cablegrams to communicate with Washington.) Bolling was relieved by Foulois and assigned to be chairman of the Joint Army-Navy Aircraft Committee, ostensibly to coordinate the activities of the military and the aviation industry in procuring aircraft. He was also Pershing's nominal aviation representative on the Supreme War Council; however, Foulois sat on both these committees. The assignment proved frustrating as his staff work and proposals were often undermined by competing interests, political in-fighting, and administrative delays. Bolling sought a combat command and was picked to become chief of air service for the U.S. II Corps when it formed in the spring. To prepare himself he visited aerodromes of the Royal Flying Corps in the vicinity of Amiens in March 1918 to observe air operations in support of the British Expeditionary Force during the German spring offensive.

== Death ==
On the morning of March 26, 1918, during the opening phase of the offensive, Bolling and his driver, Private Paul L. Holder of the 22nd Aero Squadron, left their hotel in Amiens, headed for the British aerodrome at Harbonnières. They found it deserted and continued driving east toward the front lines, where they encountered three British Army officers in Estrées-Deniécourt, including a major with whom Bolling had an acquaintance. The officers indicated that to the best of their knowledge the oncoming German forces were still five kilometers distant. With this assurance, they headed towards a hill about 2.5 km away from which they might be able to observe the battlefield. Only Bolling was armed, and that an officer's service revolver.

After driving only 300 meters, their car was ambushed by hidden German machine guns on both sides of the Amiens-Saint-Quentin Road (49.875°N 2.780°E). Before Holder could turn the car around, German fire disabled its motor. Holder and Bolling took cover in separate shell holes, which were connected by a ditch that enabled Bolling to see Holder. The fire of the machine guns lasted fifteen minutes, after which two German soldiers approached Holder's position. When one of them fired twice at the unarmed Holder crouching in his hole, Bolling shot and killed the German with his revolver. The other soldier killed Bolling with two shots, one to the chest and the other to the head.

The German troops continued west, and while Holder pretended to be dead in hope of escaping through the lines after dark, he was captured a half-hour later by follow-on troops and made a prisoner of war. Bolling was the first high-ranking air service officer killed on the battlefield in World War I. His remains were never recovered.

== Legacy ==
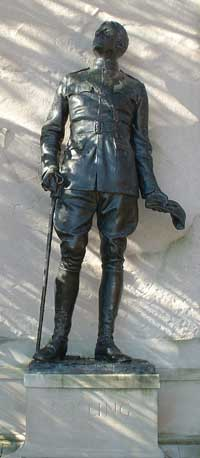
Colonel Raynal C. Bolling Memorial, Greenwich, Connecticut

Bolling was posthumously awarded the Legion of Honour by the French government and the Distinguished Service Medal by the United States Army. The sculptor Edward Clark Potter created a life-size statue of Bolling that was cast in bronze by the Gorham Foundry of Rhode Island for permanent display near the town commons of Greenwich, Connecticut. The Indiana limestone background of the memorial shows aircraft in combat in low relief. Bolling is honored at the Memorial Church of Harvard University and by "Bolling Grove," a redwood grove on the Avenue of the Giants, paralleling U.S. Highway 101 along the South Fork of the Eel River in Humboldt Redwoods State Park, California.

Bolling Field, District of Columbia, now a part of Joint Base Anacostia-Bolling, was opened on July 1, 1918, and named to commemorate Bolling.

== Notes ==
Footnotes

Citations
