= Ian Henderson (RAF officer) =

British World War I flying ace (1896–1918)

- Born: 2 October 1896; London, England
- Died: 21 June 1918 (aged 21); Turnberry, Ayr, Scotland
- Burial place: Doune Cemetery, Girvan, Ayrshire; 55°14′11″N 4°51′33″W
- Relatives: Lieutenant General Sir David Henderson (father)
- Military career
- Allegiance: United Kingdom
- Branch: British Army; Royal Air Force
- Service years: 1915–1918
- Rank: Captain
- Units: Argyll and Sutherland Highlanders; No. 19 Squadron RFC; No. 56 Squadron RFC
- Conflicts: First World War; Western Front
- Awards: Military Cross

Captain Ian Henry David Henderson, MC (2 October 1896 – 21 June 1918) was a British flying ace of the First World War, credited with seven aerial victories.

== Early life ==
Henderson was the only son of Lieutenant General Sir David Henderson, who served as Director-General of Military Aeronautics from 1914 to 1917, and as General Officer Commanding, Royal Flying Corps (RFC) from 1914 to 1915, and his wife Dame Henrietta Caroline (née Dundas).

== Military career ==
Henderson graduated from the Royal Military College, Sandhurst, on 13 January 1915, and was commissioned as a second lieutenant in the Princess Louise's (Argyll and Sutherland Highlanders) regiment. He was seconded to the RFC, and was appointed a flying officer on 21 August 1915.

He was promoted to lieutenant in his regiment on 21 January 1916, but had to wait until 1 June before receiving the same from the RFC. On 1 July he was appointed a flight commander with the acting rank of captain. Henderson was assigned to No. 19 Squadron, flying the B.E.12, gaining his first two victories in August, and was subsequently awarded the Military Cross, which was gazetted in October 1916. His citation read:

2nd Lieutenant (Temporary Captain) Ian Henry David Henderson, Argyll & Sutherland Highlanders. For conspicuous gallantry and skill on several occasions. He drove down a machine out of control, and two days later dispersed six enemy machines which were attacking his formation. A few days later again he brought down an enemy biplane, the observer being apparently killed. A week after this he attacked and drove down another machine which had wounded his leader. He has also carried out several excellent contact patrols and attacked retiring artillery and a kite balloon.

Henderson had to wait until November for his third victory, gained while flying a SPAD S.VII. In 1917 he was posted to No. 56 Squadron, flying the S.E.5a, where in July, he shot down four Albatros D.Vs. He was appointed to the General Staff as a 3rd Grade Officer, remaining there until March 1918, when he was re-appointed a flight commander with the acting rank of captain. However, on 21 June 1918, he and Harold Redler were killed in a flying accident, when their Airco DH.9 crashed at Turnberry. He is buried at Doune Cemetery, Girvan, Ayrshire.
