= Henrietta Caroline Henderson =

Scotswoman appointed DBE (1868–1959)

Dame Henrietta Caroline Henderson DBE (1868–1959; née Dundas) was a Scottish woman appointed DBE for her service during World War I. She was styled Henrietta Caroline, Lady Henderson, after her husband was knighted in 1914.

Henrietta Caroline Dundas was born in 1868 in Dundas Castle, Scotland, the daughter of Henry Robert Duncan Dundas (1853–1912) and his wife the honorable Catherine Anne Carrington Napier (1841–1929, daughter of Robert Napier, 1st Baron Napier of Magdala). She married Captain David Henderson (1862–1921), who later rose to the rank of lieutenant general, on 18 December 1895. The marriage took place in St Mary's Cathedral, Edinburgh, with eight bridesmaids and a "fully choral" service. They had one son and one daughter: their son Ian Henderson was an RAF pilot in World War I and died in a flying accident in June 1918.

She was appointed Dame Commander of the Order of the British Empire (DBE) in the 1919 New Year Honours, and in 1921 she was appointed a Lady of Grace of the Order of Saint John.

Her portrait was painted by Charles Wellington Furse.

She died on 14 April 1959.
