= Federal Aviation Commission =

The Federal Aviation Commission was set up in 1935 by order of the Air Mail Act of 1934 to make a survey of aeronautical conditions in the United States. The commission recommended an increase of the army, navy, and air forces to a total of 4,000 planes.

== Personnel ==
- Clark Howell, chairman
- Edward Pearson Warner, vice president
