= St Augustine's Church, West Monkton =

Church in Somerset, England

Church of St Augustine
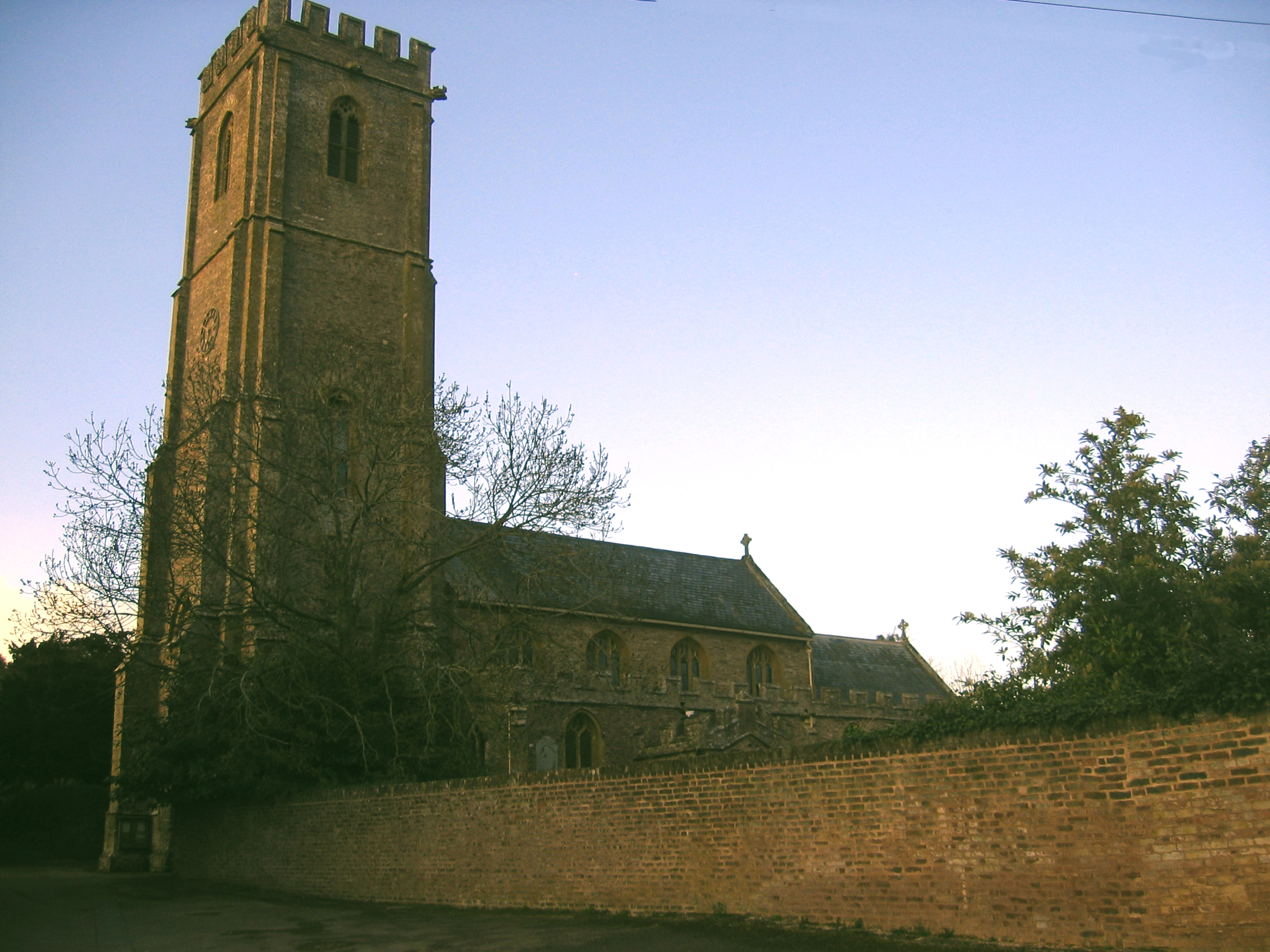

- Location within Somerset

General information
- Location: West Monkton, England
- Coordinates: 51.0507°N 3.0528°W

The Church of St Augustine in West Monkton, Somerset, England, dates from the 13th century and has been designated as a Grade I listed building.

The parish church has an 88 feet (26.8 m) tower, of four stories, with no pinnacles or fancy tracery on the windows, giving the tower a slender, austere look compared to the medieval Somerset towers of churches in nearby Taunton, for example. Nikolaus Pevsner proposes that St Augustine's tower is older than the surrounding church towers, with a tower arch that may date to 1300 as part of a previous church building.

The churchyard includes a stocks and whipping post under a canopy.

== See also ==
- List of Grade I listed buildings in Taunton Deane
- List of towers in Somerset
- List of ecclesiastical parishes in the Diocese of Bath and Wells
