= David Henderson (British Army officer) =

British Army general (1862–1921)

Lieutenant-General Sir David Henderson KCB KCVO DSO
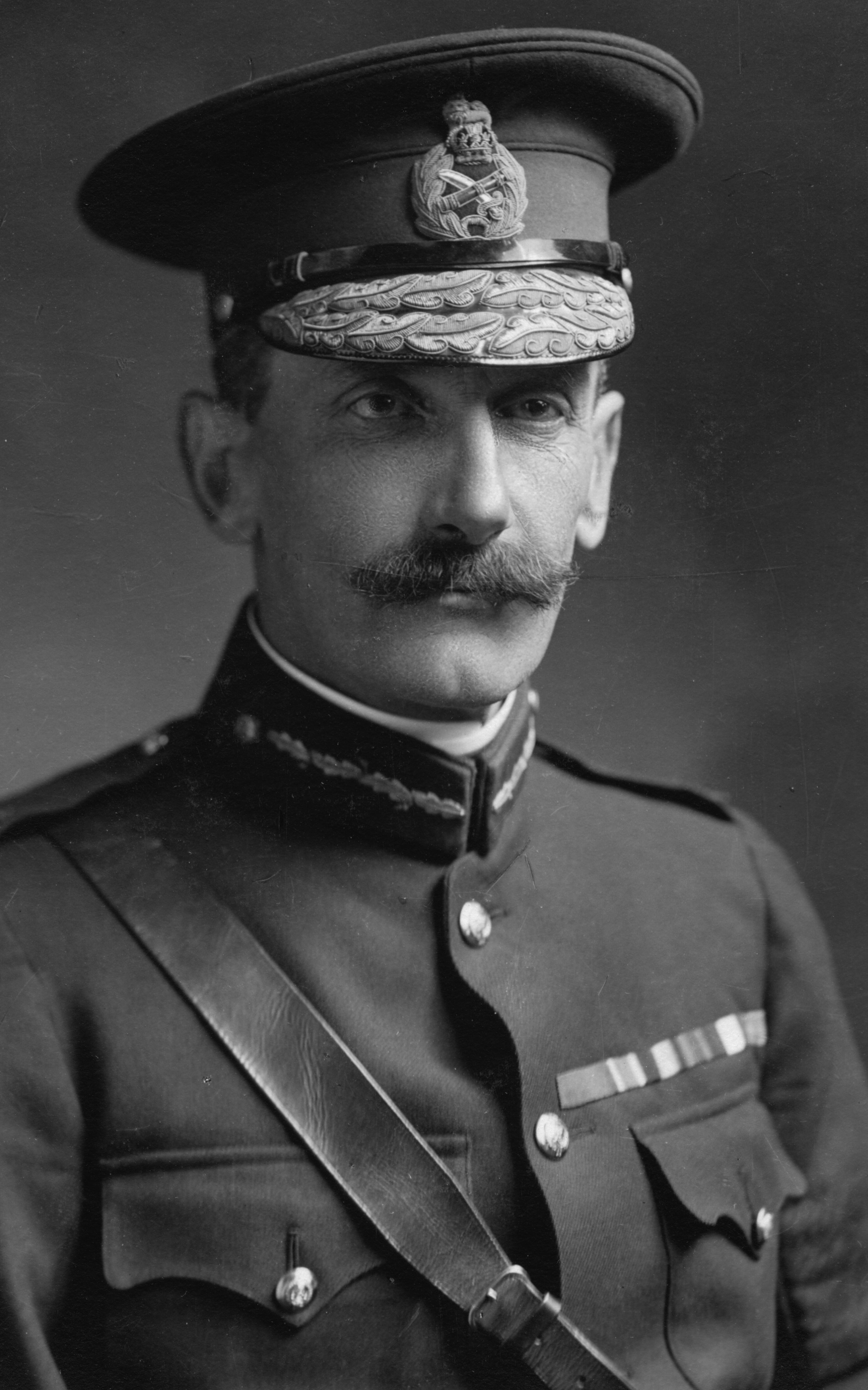
- Henderson at some point before World War I
- Born: 11 August 1862; Glasgow, Scotland
- Died: 17 August 1921 (aged 59); Geneva, Switzerland
- Spouse: Dame Henrietta Caroline Henderson (née) Dundas (m. 1895)
- Relatives: Ian Henderson (son)
- Military career
- Allegiance: United Kingdom
- Branch: British Army (1883–1918); Royal Air Force (1918–1919)
- Service years: 1883–1919
- Rank: Lieutenant-General
- Commands: Royal Flying Corps in the Field (1914–1915); 1st Infantry Division (1914)
- Conflicts: Second Boer War; Siege of Ladysmith; First World War
- Awards: Knight Commander of the Order of the Bath; Knight Commander of the Royal Victorian Order; Distinguished Service Order; Mentioned in Despatches; Grand Officer of the Legion of Honour (France); Grand Officer of the Order of the Crown (Belgium); Order of the White Eagle with Swords (Russia); Grand Officer of the Order of the Crown of Italy; Grand Cordon of the Order of the Sacred Treasure (Japan)
- Other work: Director-General of Red Cross Societies

Lieutenant-General Sir David Henderson, KCB, KCVO, DSO (11 August 1862 – 17 August 1921) was the senior leader of British military aviation during the First World War, having previously established himself as the leading authority on tactical intelligence in the British Army. He served as the commander of the Royal Flying Corps in the field during the first year of the First World War, and was instrumental in establishing the Royal Air Force as an independent service. After the war Henderson was the first Director-General of the League of Red Cross Societies.

== Early and family life ==
David Henderson was born in Glasgow on 11 August 1862 into a ship-owning family. His father, also called David Henderson, was a joint owner of the Clydeside ship builders David and William Henderson and Company.

Henderson entered the University of Glasgow in 1877 at the age of just 15. While there, he read engineering and in his fourth year (1880–1881) he studied civil engineering and mechanics as well as office and field work in engineering. For reasons now unknown, he left the university to train for a military career at the Royal Military College, Sandhurst, instead of graduating from Glasgow.

In 1895, Henderson married Henrietta Caroline Dundas, who was appointed as a Dame Commander of the Order of the British Empire (DBE) in 1919. Their children included Ian Henry David Henderson, who also joined the Royal Flying Corps, but Ian Henderson predeceased his parents, dying in a flying accident in June 1918.

== Military career ==
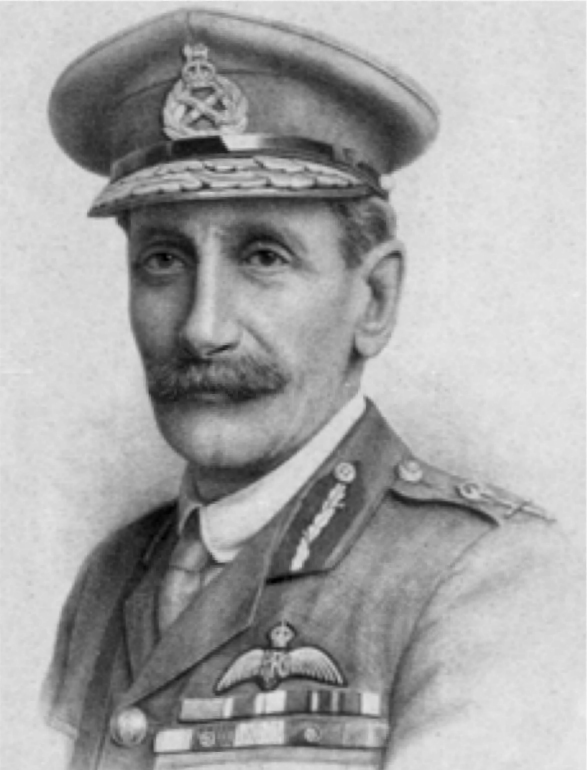
Gen David Henderson

Following officer training at the Royal Military College Sandhurst, Henderson was commissioned into the British Army on 25 August 1883, joining the Argyll and Sutherland Highlanders as a lieutenant.

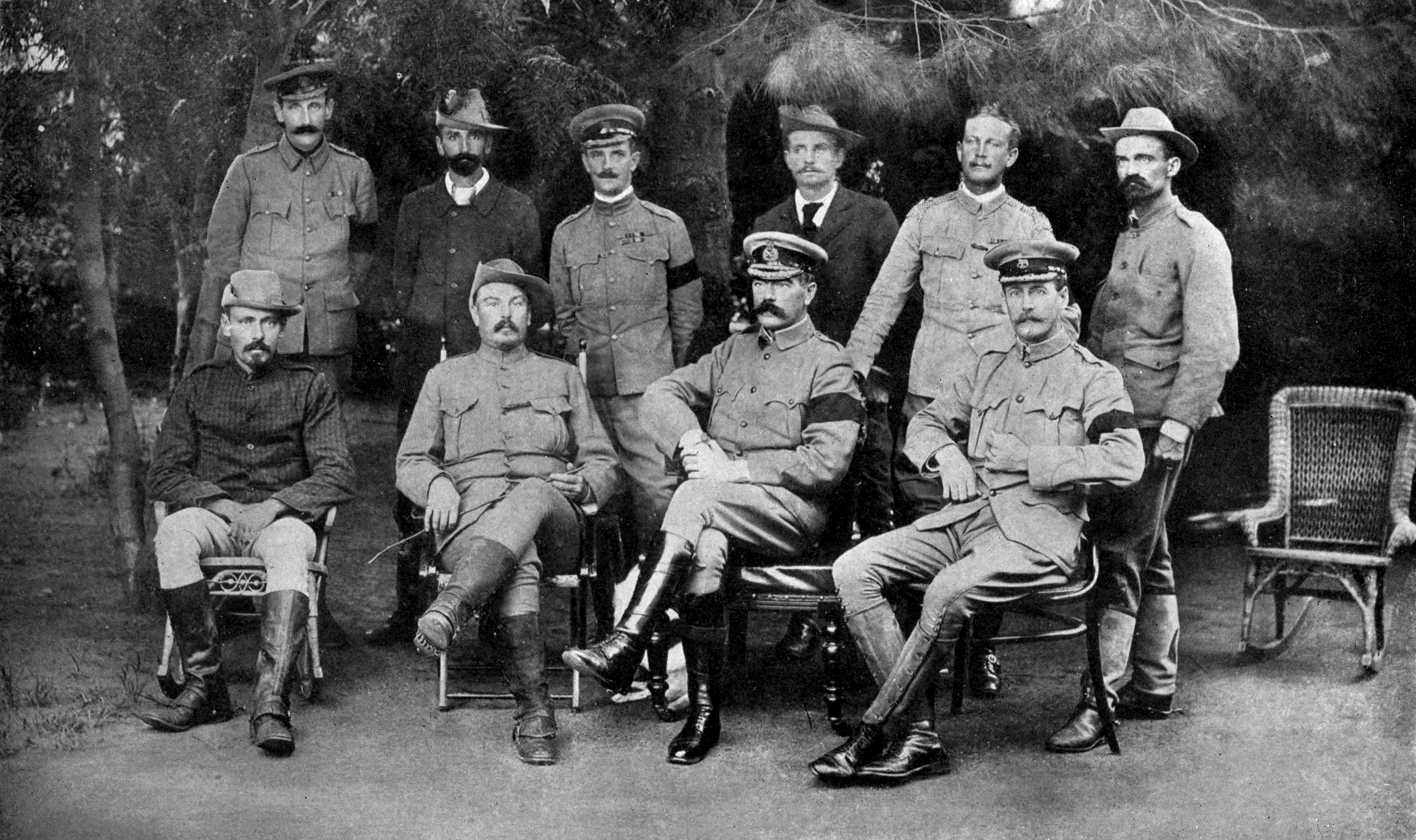
Lord Kitchener at the Peace Conference that ended the Second Boer War. Colonel Henderson is stood on the extreme left.

He was promoted to captain on 26 February 1890, and graduated from the Staff College, Camberley in 1895, the same year he married Henrietta Caroline Dundas (later Dame Henrietta Henderson, DBE). Subsequently, he was a member of the Nile Expedition of 1898, following which he received a brevet promotion to the rank of major on 16 November 1898. Three months before the outbreak of the Second Boer War Henderson was posted to Natal as an intelligence officer.

During the opening stage of the war he took part and was wounded at the Siege of Ladysmith. He received a brevet promotion to lieutenant colonel on 29 November 1900. In February 1901, the commander-in-chief in South Africa, Lord Kitchener, appointed Henderson his director of military intelligence, a post he held until the end of the war in June 1902. In a despatch dated 23 June 1902, Kitchener wrote how Henderson had "invariable done his best to cope with the great difficulties of his position." For his service in the war, he was awarded the Distinguished Service Order (DSO) in the October 1902 South Africa Honours list. His subsequent works, Field Intelligence: Its Principles and Practice (1904) and The Art of Reconnaissance (1907), did much to establish his reputation as the Army's authority on tactical intelligence.

He was promoted to major in December 1903. After having served as a deputy assistant quartermaster general, Henderson was, in November 1905, promoted to brevet colonel and succeeded Colonel Archibald Murray as an assistant adjutant general of the 1st Division. He was promoted to the substantive rank of lieutenant colonel in January 1907 and to colonel in November. In December that year he appointed as a staff officer to the staff of the inspector general of the forces, General Sir John French, for which he was, in April, granted the temporary rank of brigadier general while holding this post. In June 1909 he was made a Companion of the Order of the Bath.

In 1911, at the age of 49, Henderson learned to fly, making him the world's oldest pilot at that time. He formed part of the technical sub-committee of the Air Committee which helped to decide the organisation of the Royal Flying Corps, which was formed on 13 April 1912. In July 1912 he took over the post of director of military training at the War Office, again in succession to Archibald Murray. In 1913 the control of military aviation was separated from the responsibilities of the Master-General of the Ordnance. A new Department of Military Aeronautics was established and Henderson was appointed the first director and, with the outbreak of the First World War, he took up command of the Royal Flying Corps in the Field. He was promoted to the temporary rank of brigadier general in August 1914.

On 22 November 1914, Henderson, promoted to major general the month before, was appointed General Officer Commanding (GOC) of the 1st Division and his chief of staff Frederick Sykes took up command in his stead. However, Henderson did not spend long commanding the 1st Infantry Division. The decision to post Henderson and replace him with Sykes was not to Field Marshal Lord Kitchener's liking, and he ordered a reversal of the appointments. On 20 December 1914, Henderson resumed command of the Royal Flying Corps in the Field and Sykes was once again his chief of staff.

In 1915 Henderson returned to London to resume his London-based duties as director-general of military aeronautics, which Sefton Brancker had been performing in his absence. This meant that when, in 1917, General Jan Smuts was writing his review of the British Air Services, Henderson, who in March 1916 had been made a temporary lieutenant general, was well placed to assist. While seconded to Smuts, Henderson wrote much of what came to be called the Smuts Report. It has been argued that he had a better claim to the informal title "father of the Royal Air Force" than Sir Hugh Trenchard. Trenchard himself believed that Henderson deserved the accolade. He sat on the government's "Advisory Committee for Aeronautics", located at the National Physical Laboratory, under the chairmanship of Richard Glazebrook and presidency of John Strutt, Lord Rayleigh.

In January 1918, Henderson, who the year before had been made a substantive lieutenant general, was made a member of the Air Council, serving as its vice-president. However, having not been appointed as the RAF's Chief of the Air Staff, Henderson resigned from the Air Council in April, citing his desire to escape the atmosphere of intrigue at the Air Ministry.

Following his departure from the Air Council, Henderson returned to France where he served until October 1918. After the armistice, Henderson served as a military counsellor during the Paris Peace Conference until the signing of the Versailles Treaty in June 1919. Henderson then became Director-General of the League of Red Cross Societies in Geneva, where he died in 1921, aged 59.

== Honours ==
Henderson was awarded the Distinguished Service Order in 1902 for his work during the Second Boer War.

In April 1914 he was created Knight Commander of the Order of the Bath (KCB). In March 1918, Henderson accepted the honorary position of Colonel of the Highland Light Infantry.

David Henderson Avenue, built on the former School of Service Intelligence site in Ashford, Kent, is named after him.

== Sources ==
- Prins, François (April 2012). "Forgotten Founder". Aeroplane. Vol. 40, no. 4. pp. 60–63. ISSN 0143-7240.
- Prins, François (May 2012). "Forgotten Founder: Part 2". Aeroplane. Vol. 40, no. 5. pp. 36–38. ISSN 0143-7240.
- Raleigh, Walter (1922). The War in the Air: Being the Story of the Part Played in the Great War by the Royal Air Force: Vol 1. London: The Clarendon Press.

Military offices
Preceded by C. V. Hume	Director of Military Intelligence; For the Boer War; February 1901 – May 1902	End of Boer War
Preceded by Sir Archibald Murray	Director of Military Training; 1912–1913	Succeeded by Sir William Robertson
New title Directorate established	Director-General of Military Aeronautics; 1 September 1913 – 18 October 1917	Succeeded by John Salmond
New title Start of the First World War	General Officer Commanding the Royal Flying Corps in the Field; 5 August 1914 – 22 November 1914	Succeeded by Frederick Sykes; As Officer Commanding
Preceded by Herman Landon (Acting)	General Officer Commanding the 1st Division; 22 November – 18 December 1914	Succeeded by Richard Haking
Preceded by Frederick Sykes; As Officer Commanding	General Officer Commanding the Royal Flying Corps in the Field; 20 December 1914 – 19 August 1915	Succeeded by Hugh Trenchard
New title Air Council formed	Vice-President of the Air Council; 3 January to 17 April 1918	Vacant Title next held by J. E. B. Seely; As Under-Secretary of State for Air in 1919
Honorary titles
Preceded by Sir William Campbell	Colonel of the Highland Light Infantry; 1918–1921	Succeeded by Granville Egerton
Non-profit organization positions
New title League founded	Director-General of the League of Red Cross Societies; 1919–1921	Succeeded by Sir Claude Hill
