= Clark Howell =

American politician and publisher (1863–1936)

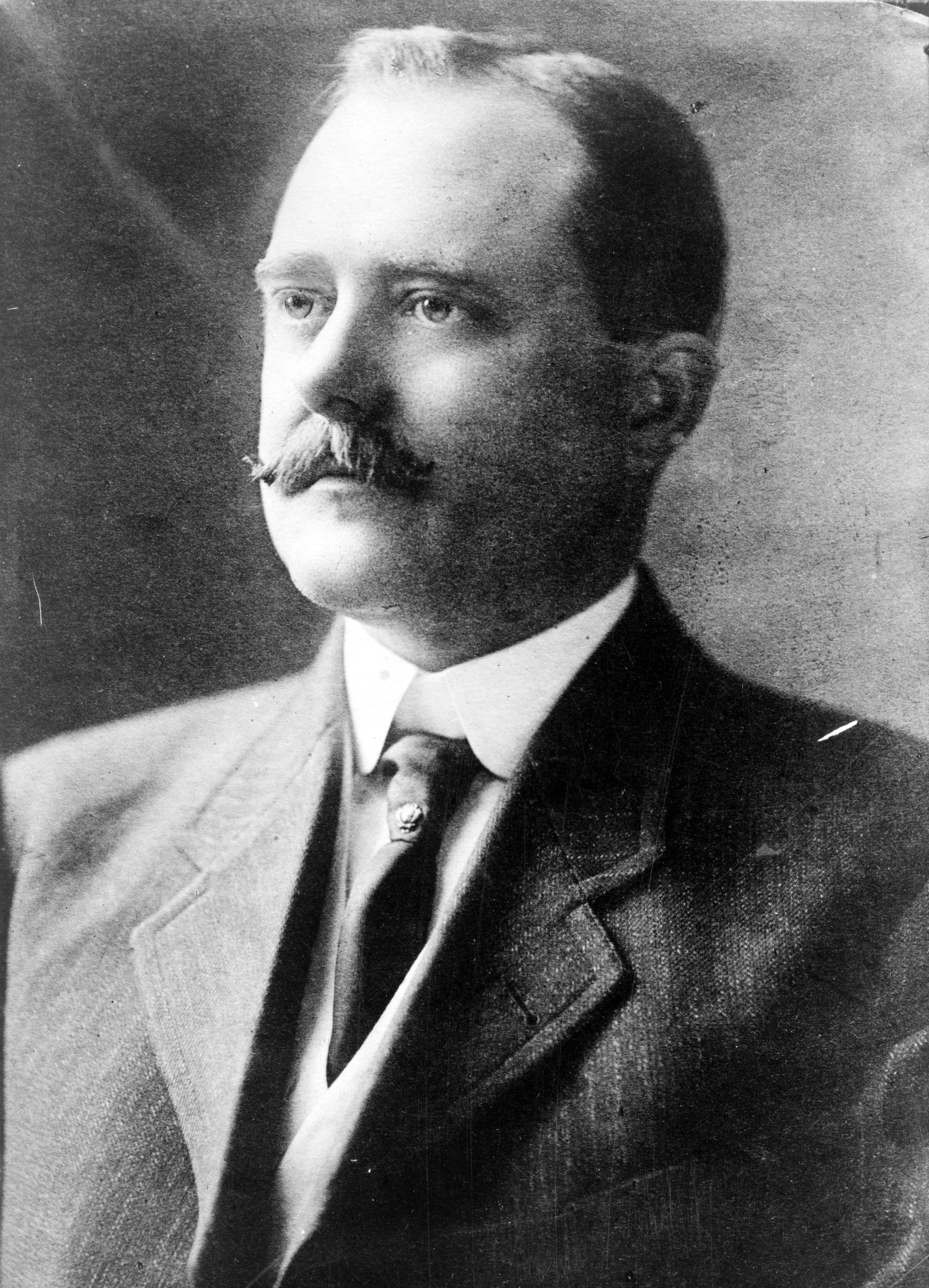

President of the Georgia State Senate
- In office 1900–1905
- Preceded by: William A. Dodson
- Succeeded by: William Stanley West

Member of the Georgia State Senate from the 35th district
- In office 1900–1905
- Preceded by: R. T. Nesbitt
- Succeeded by: A. C. Blalock

Speaker of the Georgia House of Representatives
- In office 1890–1892
- Preceded by: Alexander S. Clay
- Succeeded by: William Y. Atkinson

Member of the Georgia House of Representatives from Fulton County
- In office 1886–1892

Member of the Fulton County Board of Commissioners
- In office 1897–1898

Personal details
- Born: September 21, 1863 Erwinton, Edgefield County, South Carolina, C.S.
- Died: November 14, 1936 (aged 73) Atlanta, Georgia, U.S.
- Party: Democratic
- Spouses: Harriet Glascock Barrett (m. 1887; died 1898); Annie Comer (m. 1900; died 1922); Margaret Cannon Carr (m. 1922)
- Children: 5
- Education: University of Georgia
- Occupation: Journalist; politician
- Awards: Pulitzer Prize (1931)

Clark Howell (September 21, 1863 – November 14, 1936) was a Pulitzer Prize winning American newspaper man and politician from the state of Georgia. For fifty-three years, he was editorial executive and owner of The Atlanta Constitution.

== Early years and education ==
Clark Howell was born on September 21, 1863, in Erwinton, in Edgefield County, South Carolina, to Julia A. Erwin and Evan P. Howell. During the American Civil War his mother was in South Carolina while his father, Captain Evan Howell, served in the infantry and commanded a Confederate artillery battery. After the war, Howell's father moved the family to Atlanta where the senior Howell cut and sold timber from family land. Two years later, Evan Howell found employment as a reporter and city editor for the Atlanta Intelligencer. In 1876, Evan Howell bought a half interest in the Atlanta Constitution from Col. E.Y. Clarke. The other half interest was owned by William A. Hemphill, future mayor of Atlanta, who retained his half ownership interest and his position as the paper's business manager until 1901.

Clark Howell attended the University of Georgia (UGA) in Athens where he was a member of the Phi Kappa Literary Society as well as an early member of the Gamma chapter of the Kappa Alpha Order, and graduated with an A.B. degree in 1883.

=== Career in journalism ===
Directly after graduating from college, Howell moved to New York City and began working as a reporter for The New York Times then worked as the night telegraph editor of the Philadelphia Press.

In 1884 he returned to Atlanta and worked as a reporter and night editor at his father's newspaper, the Atlanta Constitution. His father was editor-in-chief. After managing editor Henry W. Grady died in 1889, the younger Howell took over that position. He eventually succeeded his father as editor-in-chief in 1897, upon the elder Howell's retirement. In 1901, Clark Howell purchased controlling shares in the Constitution, from Hemphill, to become its new owner. Howell remained owner and editor of the paper until his death in 1936.

== Political service and Pulitzer Prize ==
Starting in 1886, Howell was elected to three terms in the Georgia House of Representatives, serving as Speaker for one term. In 1897, he was elected to the Fulton County Board of Commissioners and served for one year. In 1900, he was elected one of the original directors of the Associated Press, a position he maintained the rest of his life. Also in 1900 he was elected to the Georgia Senate where he served consecutive two-years terms and was the President of that body during the latter term. Following that he was defeated in the contentious 1906 Democratic Georgia gubernatorial race won by Hoke Smith, owner of the rival Atlanta Journal newspaper.

Even though Howell was a lifelong Democrat, President Warren G. Harding placed him on a special mining commission in 1922 and ten years later President Hoover appointed him to a national transportation commission.

He served as Georgia's state Democratic committeeman from 1896 to 1924 and again starting in June 1936 where he succeeded Governor Eugene Talmadge.

The Atlanta Constitution won the 1931 Pulitzer Prize for Howell's series exposing the Atlanta graft ring which led to six indictments and the downfall of Mayor I. N. Ragsdale's political career. In 1934, President Roosevelt named him to chair the Federal Aviation Commission in the wake of the Air Mail scandal and appointed him chairman of a commission to study aviation in foreign countries. The French government made him a Chevalier of the Legion of Honor in 1935.

== Radio ==
In late July 1923, Howell arranged for the donation to Georgia Tech of equipment previously used by the Atlanta Constitution's radio station, WGM, which was used to help launch WBBF (later WGST, then WGKA AM 920) in January 1924. Operating as a commercial station with educational opportunities for students, the radio station was officially owned by the Board of Regents. After several lawsuits, the station was sold to a private corporation in 1974. (In 1968 the school established an educational FM station, WREK.) A freshman residence hall at Georgia Tech, Howell Hall, as well as an academic building at his alma mater, Clark Howell Hall, are named in his honor.

== Personal life ==
Howell's second wife, Annie, was the daughter of Hugh Comer, president of the Central of Georgia Railway.

== Death ==
When Clark Howell died, on November 14, 1936, in Atlanta, he was the president and editor of the Atlanta Constitution and a director of the Associated Press.

== See also ==
- List of speakers of the Georgia House of Representatives
