= Arnold Redler =

British businessman (1875 – 1958)

Arnold Redler (September 1875 – October 1958) was the British founder of the conveying company Redler Limited in Stroud, Gloucestershire in 1920 and the father of the En-Masse principle of conveying bulk materials.

== Early years ==
Born in Bishops Nympton, Devon to Thomas John Redler a Corn Miller and Georgina Relder, Arnold grew up as the second youngest of 6 children at the family home of Bathpool Mill in West Monkton. His father bought the mill when Arnold was 14 from Captain George Beadon.
