= West Monkton =

Village and civil parish in Somerset, England

Coordinates: 51.051°N 3.045°W

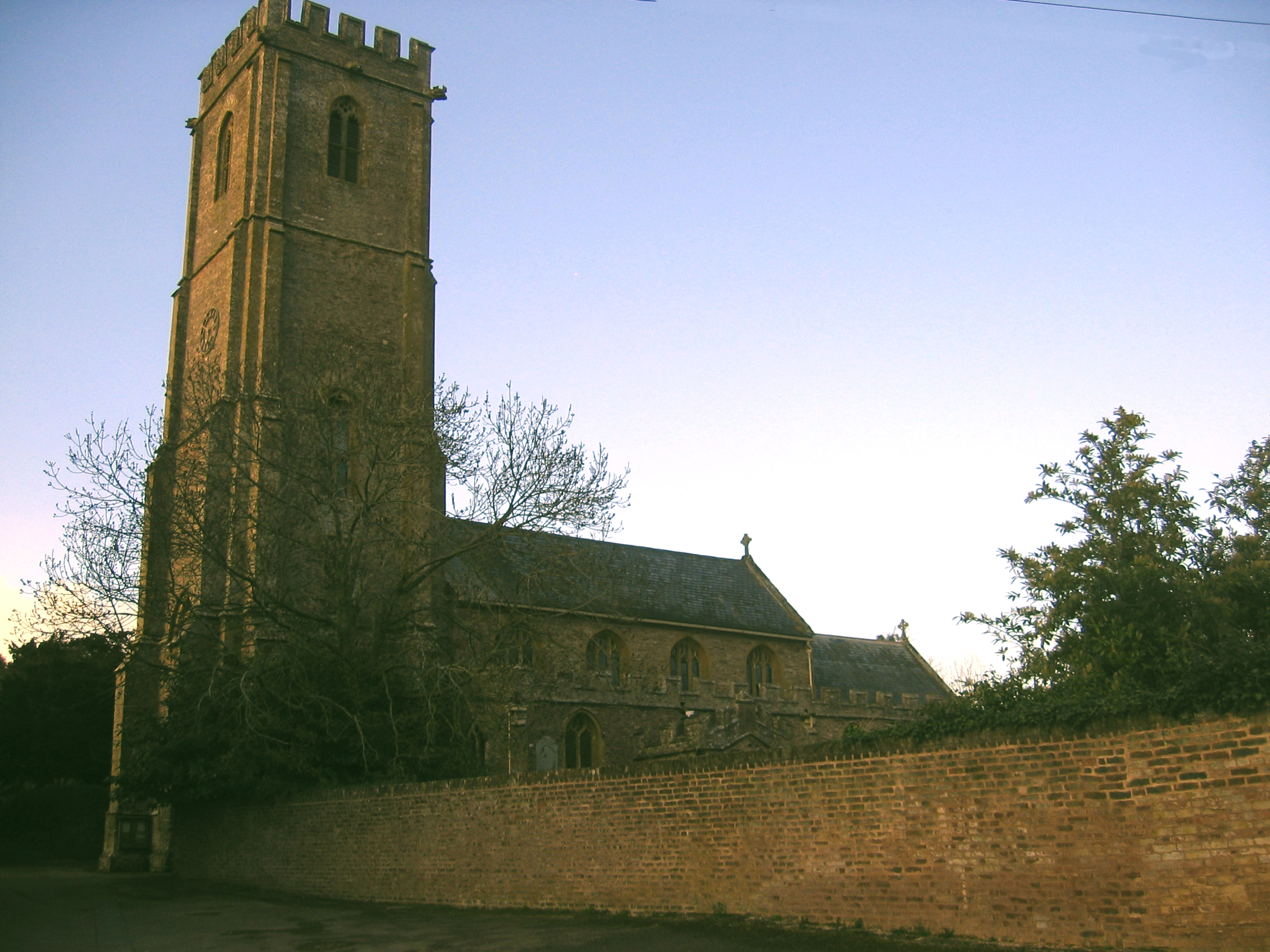
- St Augustine's Parish Church

- Location within Somerset
- Population: 2,787 (2011)
- OS grid reference: ST2628
- Civil parish: West Monkton
- Unitary authority: Somerset Council
- Ceremonial county: Somerset
- Region: South West
- Country: England
- Sovereign state: United Kingdom
- Post town: TAUNTON
- Postcode district: TA2
- Dialling code: 01823
- Police: Avon and Somerset
- Fire: Devon and Somerset
- Ambulance: South Western
- UK Parliament: Taunton and Wellington

West Monkton is a village and civil parish in Somerset, England, situated 2 miles (3.2 km) north east of Taunton. The parish includes the hamlets of Monkton Heathfield, Bathpool, and Burlinch and the western parts of Coombe and Walford, and had a population of 2,787 at the 2011 census.

== History ==
The charter for West Monkton was given to Glastonbury Abbey by the Saxon king Centwine in 682. The monks from the abbey gave the village its name Monkton, and it was called West as being west of the other estates of the abbey.

The parish of West Monkton was part of the Whitley Hundred.

After the dissolution of the monasteries the manor was granted to William Paulet, Marquess of Winchester, passing in 1616 to the Warres of Hestercombe and in 1872 to Viscount Portman of Orchard Portman.

Milling at Bathpool in the River Tone had a chequered history. There had been a mill at this location for several centuries, which had been rebuilt or adapted as required. In March 1812, the structure was burnt down by a fire, caused, according to the Taunton Courier, by "the excessive friction excited in the stones used in the process of shelling clover seeds". Stocks of flour, grain and flax valued at £2,500 were destroyed. The mill was rebuilt and later owned by Captain George Beadon. The mill was purchased by Thomas Redler in 1889 on the death of Beadon, but another fire damaged much of it two years later. Redler rebuilt it with safety in mind, and installed a steam-driven turbine as water levels were often inadequate to power the wheels. Two more turbines followed, and the water wheels were removed. Steam from the turbines was also used to heat bread ovens, which were amongst the first in the country to be heated in this way. In September 1915, another fire gutted the building, which was not rebuilt, and the ruins were demolished in the 1920s.

In the 1820s the Bridgwater and Taunton Canal was constructed. The work included the construction of several bridges to carry roads over the canal, one of which is now the A38 road. During the restoration of the canal in the 1980s the condition of the swing bridge at Bathpool caused a change in policy. There were objections to the plan to replace it with a fixed bridge with limited headroom, and the planning application was deferred.

== Governance ==
The parish council has responsibility for local issues, including setting an annual precept (local rate) to cover the council’s operating costs and producing annual accounts for public scrutiny. The parish council evaluates local planning applications and works with the local police, district council officers, and neighbourhood watch groups on matters of crime, security, and traffic. The parish council's role also includes initiating projects for the maintenance and repair of parish facilities, as well as consulting with the district council on the maintenance, repair, and improvement of highways, drainage, footpaths, public transport, and street cleaning. Conservation matters (including trees and listed buildings) and environmental issues are also the responsibility of the council.

For local government purposes, since 1 April 2023, the village comes under the unitary authority of Somerset Council. Prior to this, it was part of the non-metropolitan district of Somerset West and Taunton (formed on 1 April 2019) and, before this, the district of Taunton Deane (established under the Local Government Act 1972). From 1894-1974, for local government purposes, West Monkton was part of Taunton Rural District.

There is an electoral ward with the same name. Although West Monkton parish covers certain additional hamlets the ward extends to Cheddon Fitzpaine. The total population of the ward at the 2011 census was 4,304.

It is also part of the Taunton and Wellington county constituency represented in the House of Commons of the Parliament of the United Kingdom. It elects one Member of Parliament (MP) by the first past the post system of election.

== Landmarks ==
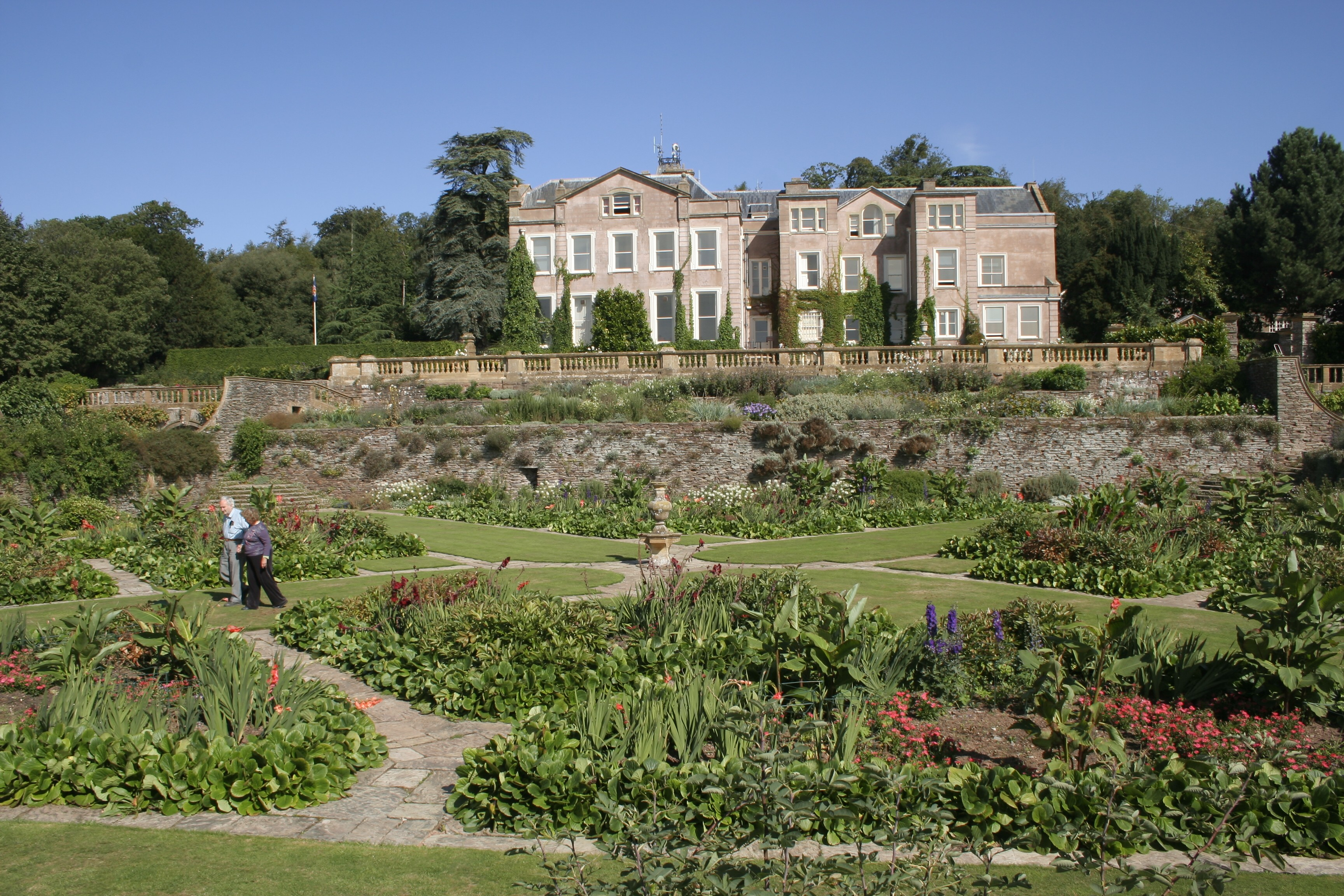
Hestercombe House

Within the parish is Hestercombe House and gardens designed by Sir Edwin Lutyens. Its restoration to Gertrude Jekyll's original plans (1904–07) have made it "one of the best Jekyll-Lutyens gardens open to the public on a regular basis", visited by approximately 70,000 people per year. The estate is Grade I listed on the English Heritage Register of Parks and Gardens of Special Historic Interest in England. The site also includes a 0.08 hectare biological Site of Special Scientific Interest as it is used as a roost site by Lesser Horseshoe Bats and has been designated as a Special Area of Conservation (SAC). The house was used as the headquarters of the British 8th Corps in the Second World War, and has been owned by Somerset County Council since 1951.

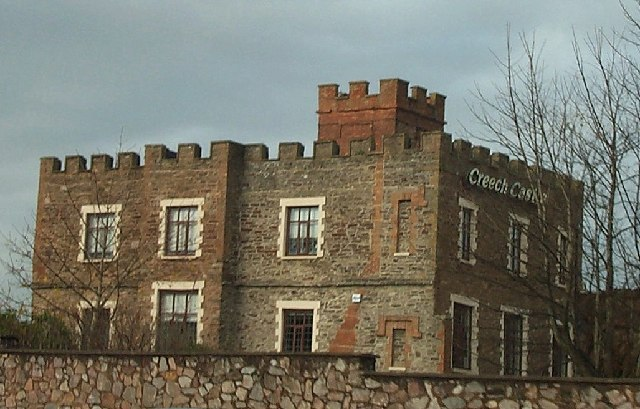
Creech Castle

Walford house was built in the late 18th century but in 1985 was converted into flats. It is a Grade II* listed building.

Creech Castle was built around 1850 and was the home of the Beadon family, but was converted into a hotel and is now a managed office. It is named after the characteristic shaped hill opposite it.

== Education ==
Monkton Heathfield is home to Heathfield Community School a state secondary school with 1,181 students aged 11 – 16 and has an Arts College specialist status.

== Religious sites ==
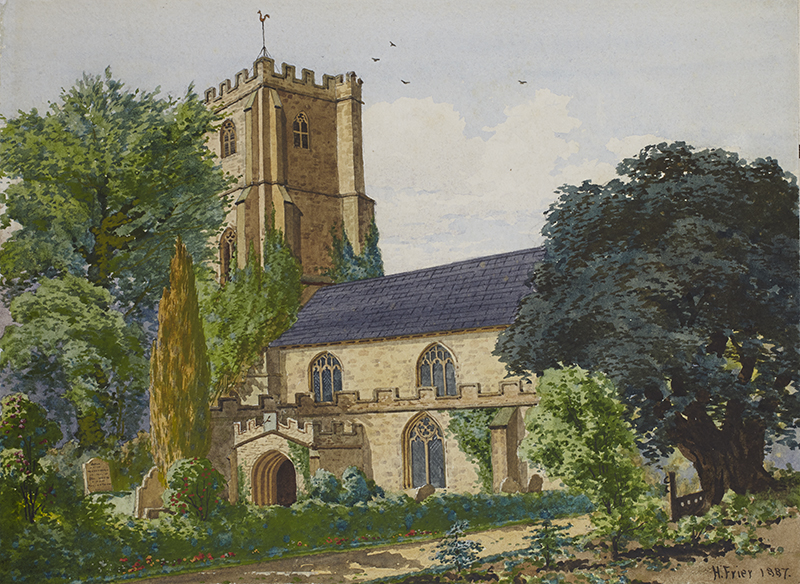
West Monkton Church, Watercolour on paper, painted by Harry Frier in 1887

The parish church of St Augustine has an 88-foot tower, four stories, with no pinnacles or fancy tracery on the windows, giving the tower a slender, austere look compared to the medieval Somerset towers of churches in nearby Taunton, for example. Nikolaus Pevsner proposes that St Augustine's tower is older than the surrounding church towers, with a tower arch that may date to 1300 as part of a previous church building. The churchyard includes a stocks and whipping post under a canopy.

== Sports ==
West Monkton is home to the West Monkton Cricket Club, who play on Saturdays in the 1st and 4th divisions of the West Somerset Cricket League.
