= List of people educated at Haileybury and Imperial Service College =

Haileybury and Imperial Service College is an independent school near Hertford in England. Originally a boys' public school, it is now co-educational, enrolling pupils at 11+, 13+ and 16+ stages of education. Over 750 pupils attend Haileybury, of whom more than 500 board.

The following are notable alumni of Haileybury:

== Arts ==
- Michael Aitkens, scriptwriter
- Alan Ayckbourn, dramatist
- John Bailey, literary critic
- Davy Burnaby, actor
- John Blofeld, Taoist and Buddhist author
- Reginald Blomfield, architect
- Bruce Bairnsfather (attended United Services College), humourist
- Erskine Childers, author of The Riddle of the Sands
- Harold Creighton, magazine proprietor
- Michael Davie, journalist and newspaper editor
- Edmund Fisher, architect
- Philip Franks, actor and director
- Charles Wellington Furse, artist
- John Gau (1940–2024), British television producer
- Guy Hamilton, film director
- Gerald Harper, actor
- John Howard Davies, TV director and producer
- Dom Joly, comedian and journalist
- Rudyard Kipling, winner of the Nobel Prize for Literature
- Quentin Letts, journalist
- Chris Lowe, BBC journalist and news presenter
- Simon MacCorkindale, actor
- Stephen Mangan, actor
- Lionel Marson, actor
- John McCarthy, journalist
- David Meyer, actor
- Christopher Nolan, film director
- Hoyt Richards, model and actor
- Alan Ross, poet and writer
- Joe Saward, sports journalist and author
- Rik Simpson, record producer, sound engineer, musician, and songwriter
- Alison Stephens, virtuoso classical mandolinist and recording artist
- Arthur Thomas, composer
- Herbert Trench, poet
- Rex Whistler, artist
- Peter Woodward, actor
- Tim Woodward, actor
- Bryan Wynter, artist

== Armed Forces ==
- Field Marshal Edmund Allenby, 1st Viscount Allenby
- Field Marshal Sir John Chapple
- Marshal of the Royal Air Force Sir William Dickson
- Marshal of the Royal Air Force Sir John Slessor
- Admiral Sir Jonathon Band, First Sea Lord
- Admiral Sir Royston Wright, Second Sea Lord
- Air Chief Marshal Sir Robert Brooke-Popham
- Air Chief Marshal Sir Trafford Leigh-Mallory
- Air Chief Marshal Sir Arthur Penrose Martyn Sanders
- Air Vice-Marshal Francis Richard Lee Mellersh
- General Sir Thomas Astley Cubitt
- General David Ramsbotham, Baron Ramsbotham
- General Lionel Dunsterville
- General Sir Alexander Godley
- General Sir Hugh Henry Gough
- General Sir Reginald May
- General Sir Rupert Smith
- Lieutenant General Sir Richard Vickers
- Major General Reverend Morgan Llewellyn
- Major General David Shaw
- Major General Hurdis Ravenshaw
- Major General Hubert Hamilton
- Major General Sir Thompson Capper
- Major General William George Walker
- Major General Clifford Coffin
- Major General Arthur Henley Dowson
- Brigadier George William St. George Grogan
- Brigadier Francis Aylmer Maxwell
- Brigadier Alexander Gore Arkwright Hore-Ruthven
- Brigadier-General Clifton Inglis Stockwell
- Brigadier General Sydney Frederick Williams
- Lieutenant-Colonel Arthur Rawlins
- Lieutenant-Colonel Gordon Thorne
- Group Captain Peter Townsend
- Flight Lieutenant Edward Mortimer-Rose
- Harry Carr, Special Intelligence Service 1919–45, Northern Area Controller (Baltic & USSR)
- Brigadier-general Archibald James Fergusson Eden

== Victoria Cross and George Cross holders ==
Seventeen former pupils, and one master, of Haileybury and its antecedents have received the Victoria Cross, and three former pupils the George Cross.

=== Victoria Cross ===
Pupils

- Indian Rebellion of 1857
  - General Sir Hugh Henry Gough (attended East India College Haileybury)
  - Ross Lowis Mangles (attended East India College Haileybury) - A Civilian recipient.
  - William Fraser McDonell (attended East India College Haileybury) - A Civilian recipient.
- Persian War 1857
  - Lieutenant Arthur Thomas Moore (attended East India College Haileybury) He later achieved the rank of major general and was made a Companion of the Most Honourable Order of the Bath (CB).
- Zulu War 1879
  - Lieutenant Nevill Josiah Aylmer Coghill (attended Haileybury College, Trevelyan House from 1865 to 1869)
- Sudan Campaign 1898
  - Brigadier General Alexander Gore Arkwright Hore-Ruthven, Earl of Gowrie & Viscount Ruthven of Canberra. (attended United Services College 1882.2). He was a Captain when he earned his VC.
- Second Boer War 1899–1902
  - Colonel Edward Douglas Browne-Synge-Hutchinson (attended United Services College Day Boy 1875). He was a Major when he earned his VC.
  - Brigadier General Francis Aylmer Maxwell (attended United Services College 1883–1890)
  - Captain Conwyn Mansel-Jones (attended Haileybury College, Batten House 1885–1888)
- Third Somaliland Expedition 1903
  - Major General William George Walker (attended Haileybury College, Colvin House, 1876–1881)
- First World War
  - Captain Anketell Moutray Read (attended United Services College 1898–1902)
  - Second Lieutenant Rupert Price Hallowes (attended Haileybury College, Le Bas House 1894–1897)
  - Major General Clifford Coffin (attended Haileybury College, Lawrence House, 1884–1886)
  - Captain Clement Robertson (attended Haileybury College, Colvin House 1904–1906)
  - Captain Cyril Hubert Frisby (attended Haileybury College, Hailey House, 1899–1903)
  - Brigadier General George William St. George Grogan (attended United Services College, 1890–1893)
- Korean War 1951
  - Colonel James Carne (attended Imperial Service College, (Alexander House), 1920–1923)

Staff

- First World War
  - Major Richard Raymond Willis (staff at Haileybury College, 1921–1921)

=== George Cross ===
- First World War 1919
  - Wing Commander Harry "Wings" Day (Harry Melville Arbuthnot Day) (formerly AM)
- Second World War
  - Wing Commander Laurence Frank Sinclair

== Business ==
- James Henderson; former CEO of Bell Pottinger
- Sir Clive Martin
- Prannoy Roy; Founder NDTV
- Alan Sainsbury, Baron Sainsbury of Drury Lane

== Law ==
- Sir Scott Baker
- Kenelm George Digby
- Geoffrey Lawrence, 1st Baron Oaksey
- Sir Richard May
- Sir James Miskin
- Cyril Radcliffe, 1st Viscount Radcliffe
- Sir Barry Sheen
- Sir Arthur Watts

== Learning ==
- Forster Fitzgerald Arbuthnot
- Frank Bell
- John Burnaby, Regius Professor of Divinity, Cambridge University
- Lionel Curtis, professor at Oxford University
- Bonamy Dobrée
- W. H. C. Frend
- Peter Garwood, HM Inspector of Schools
- Bertrand Hallward
- Brian Houghton Hodgson
- Alexander Francis Kirkpatrick, Master of Selwyn College, Cambridge
- Peter Ladefoged, linguist and phonetician
- Robert Liddell
- Jack Meyer, founder of Millfield School and county cricketer
- Humphry Osmond
- Frank Podmore
- George Speaight

== Politics ==
- Cuthbert James McCall Alport, Baron Alport, Cabinet Minister
- Clement Attlee, Prime Minister
- Hugh Bayley
- Sir Geoffrey de Freitas
- Barry Gardiner, Labour politician
- Nick Herbert, Baron Herbert of South Downs
- John Robert Jermain Macnamara
- Christopher Mayhew, Baron Mayhew
- Ian Stewart, Baron Stewartby
- Tom Sutcliffe MP
- David Garro Trefgarne, 2nd Baron Trefgarne
- Sir Edward Wakefield

== Civil, Diplomatic and Colonial Services ==
- Sir Andrew Barkworth-Wright
- Henry Bartle Frere, 1st Baronet
- John Beames, Bengal cadre, author of "Memoirs of a Bengal Civilian"
- Sir Andrew Green
- Patrick Keen, colonial officer in British India
- Edward Maltby (British civil servant), Acting governor of Madras
- Stewart Perowne
- Rennell Rodd, 1st Baron Rennell
- Sir Harold Vincent

== Sport ==
- John A'Deane, New Zealand cricketer
- Tom Askwith, Olympic Rower
- John Batten, England rugby union international
- Sam Billings, English cricketer
- John Birkett, England rugby union international player and captain.
- Ronald Brooks, English cricketer
- Ernest Cheston, England rugby union international
- John Cocks, English cricketer
- David Cooke, England rugby union international
- Edward D'Aeth, English first-class cricketer
- Jehan Daruvala, racing driver
- Devlin DeFrancesco, racing driver
- Richard Ellis, Gloucestershire and Middlesex English county cricketer
- Charles Evans, first-class cricketer
- Noel Evans, first-class cricketer
- Zara Everitt, international netball player representing England Roses and domestically London Pulse.
- Guy Evers, England rugby union international
- Archibald Fargus, English cricketer, scholar and clergyman
- Lionel Frere, English cricketer and tennis player
- Jamie George, England & Saracens rugby union player, England Captain
- Billy Geen, Welsh rugby union international
- Darren Gerard, cricketer
- Charles Gurdon, Cambridge varsity rower and England rugby union international
- Herbert Hake, English first-class cricketer
- Nigel Harrison, English first-class cricketer
- Eric Hudson, English first-class cricketer
- Callum Ilott, racing driver
- Ronald Lee, English first-class cricketer
- Victor Le Fanu, Ireland rugby union international
- Patrick Keen, English first-class cricketer
- Maharajkumar of Vizianagram, Indian cricketer
- Lionel Marson, English first-class cricketer
- Martin Maslin, English first-class cricketer
- Osbert Mackie, England rugby union international and Anglican priest
- William Marillier, English first-class cricketer
- Ralph McCall, Scottish first-class cricketer
- Percy Mead, English first-class cricketer
- Jack Meyer, English first-class cricketer and founder of Millfield School
- Charles Michell, English first-class cricketer
- Andrew Miller, Middlesex English county cricketer
- Sir Stirling Moss, Formula One racing driver
- David Newsom, English first-class cricketer and Royal Navy officer
- Clément Novalak, racing driver
- Mike Parkes, Engineer (Hillman Imp) and Formula 1 racing driver
- Oscar Piastri, Formula One racing driver
- James Pull, racing driver
- James Souter, English first-class cricketer
- Major-General James Spens, English first-class cricketer and British Army officer
- Robert Spurway, English cricketer
- Arthur Tharp, English cricketer
- Gordon Thorne, English cricketer
- Bill Tyrwhitt-Drake, English cricketer
- Thomas Usborne, English cricketer
- Walter Vezey, English cricketer
- Sir Harold Vincent, English cricketer
- Nick Walker (cricketer), Derbyshire and Leicestershire English county cricketer
- Peter Warfield, England rugby union international
- Alec Wills, English cricketer
- Charles Wynch, English first-class cricketer
- Chris Wyles, Saracens and USA rugby union international

== Miscellaneous ==
- Richard Ambler, molecular biologist
- William Henry Battle, surgeon
- Edward Clive Bayley, archaeologist
- Basil Jellicoe, Church of England priest and housing reformer.
- Quentin Stafford-Fraser, co-creator of the Trojan Room coffee pot
- Prince Andrew Romanov
