= List of Victorian era British generals =

This is an incomplete list of British generals who served during the reign of Queen Victoria (1837 to 1901).

== A ==
- General Richard Airey: Quartermaster-general to Lord Raglan during the Crimean War.
- General Sir Samuel Benjamin Auchmuty: Staff officer and infantry commander.
- Surgeon Major General Grahame Auchinleck M.D. (Army Medical Department, 1883–86): Served in the Anglo-Burmese War of 1853-54, and later during the 1858 Eusofzie Expedition into the North West Frontier. He was also present with 81st Regiment during the Indian Mutiny.

== B ==
- Major General Sir Geoffrey Barton: Commanded the 6th Infantry Brigade during the Second Boer War.
- Major General Sir Bindon Blood: Commander of British forces on the North-West Frontier in the 1890s.
- General Sir George Brown: British divisional commander during the Crimean War
- Lieutenant General Sir William Francis Butler GCB, PC (Ire) (31 October 1838 – 7 June 1910) was an Irish 19th-century British Army officer, writer, and adventurer. He was Commander in Chief of British Forces in South Africa at the outbreak of the Boer War.
- General Sir Redvers Henry Buller, VC, GCB, GCMG (7 December 1839 – 2 June 1908) was a British Army officer and a recipient of the Victoria Cross, the highest award for gallantry in the face of the enemy that can be awarded to British and Commonwealth forces. He served as Commander-in-Chief of British Forces in South Africa during the early months of the Second Boer War and subsequently commanded the army in Natal until his return to England in November 1900.

== C ==
- General Prince George, Duke of Cambridge: Longtime Commander-in-Chief of the British Army; forced to retire in 1895.
- Lieutenant General Lord Cardigan: British aristocrat; purchased a commission and continued to buy promotions, eventually becoming commander of the Light Brigade; leading it on its famous charge in 1854, during the Crimean War.
- General Duncan Cameron commander during the New Zealand Wars
- Field Marshal Sir Colin Campbell, 1st Baron Clyde: Scottish Highlander commander during the Crimean War; overall British commander during the Indian Mutiny
- Major General Robert Carey commander during the New Zealand Wars
- Major General John Talbot Coke commanded the 10th Infantry Brigade during the Second Boer War.
- Major General Sir George Pomeroy Colley: Governor General and C-in-C in South Africa during the First Boer War; was killed in action at the Battle of Majuba Hill.
- Major General Prince Arthur, Duke of Connaught: Commander of the Guards Brigade during the Anglo-Egyptian War of 1882.

== D ==
Lieutenant-General Douglas Mackinnon Baillie Hamilton Cochrane, 12th Earl of Dundonald: Commanded the irregular mounted division during the Second Boer War

== E ==
- Major General William George Keith Elphinstone: Commander of the Anglo-Indian army that invaded and occupied Afghanistan in 1841 during the First Anglo-Afghan War; captured by tribesmen during a disastrous retreat, he died in captivity.

== F ==
- Major-General Sir George Townshend Forestier-Walker KCB (2 August 1866 – 23 January 1939) was a Commander of British forces in the Cape Colony and senior British Army officer during World War I.[2]

== G ==
- Lieutenant General Sir William Forbes Gatacre: Commanded a division of two brigades at the Battle of Omdurman and the 3rd Division of the 1st Army Corps during the Second Boer War; suffered a large defeat at the Battle of Stormberg.
- Major General Charles George Gordon: Colorful Royal Engineer officer; employed by the British-dominated Egyptian government (for the second time) as governor-general of the Sudan; killed after the Siege of Khartoum during the Mahdist War.
- Field Marshal Viscount Gough: Commander of British forces during the First Opium War and the First and Second Sikh Wars.
- Lieutenant General Sir Gerald Graham: Victoria Cross winner and senior commander during the Anglo-Egyptian War and the Mahdist War of the 1880s.

== H ==
- General Sir Ian Hamilton: Brigade commander, Tirah Field Force; held various positions during the Second Boer War; commanded Allied troops during the fruitless Gallipoli campaign.
- Major General Sir Henry Havelock: Commanded units in the Indian Mutiny, including the column that retook the captured city of Cawnpore (too late to prevent the massacre of Europeans inside) and relieved the siege of Lucknow for the first time; died of dysentery just after the siege was finally lifted.
- General Sir Bruce Meade Hamilton, GCB, KCVO (7 December 1857 – 6 July 1936) was a British Army general during the Second Boer War and the First World War.

== K ==
- Field Marshal Lord Kitchener: Commander of British troops in the Mahdist War and the Second Boer War; Secretary of State for War during the First World War; drowned when his ship collided with a German underwater mine.

== L ==
- Field Marshal Lord Lucan: Like his rival Lord Cardigan, Lucan purchased his way through the ranks, attaining command of the Cavalry Division, which included the Light Brigade, during the Crimean War.
- General Sir Neville Lyttelton: commanded the 4th Infantry Brigade (United Kingdom) during the Second Boer War.

== M ==
- Major General Sir Hector MacDonald: Scottish-born commander of troops during the Mahdist War and the Second Boer War in the late 1890s; committed suicide in 1903 when accused of homosexuality.
- Field Marshal Paul Sanford Methuen, 3rd Baron Methuen: Commanded the 1st Division during the Second Boer War.

== N ==
- General Sir Charles James Napier: Commander of the Anglo-Indian army that conquered Scinde in India; reputedly punned "I have sinned" when he had completed the bloody conquest.
- Field Marshal Robert Napier, Baron Napier: Commander of the British expeditionary force that overthrew King Theodore II of Ethiopia, who had tortured British dignitaries and imprisoned other Europeans.
- Brigadier John Nicholson: Eccentric East India Company officer who oversaw the recapture of Delhi, which had been overrun by Indian mutineers in 1857.
- Lieutenant General Sir William Sherbrooke Ramsey Norcott: commanded the Rifle Brigade during the Crimean War and was Aide-de-camp to Queen Victoria.

== P ==
- General Herbert Plumer, 1st Viscount Plumer Was in Second Boer War and World War I; on the Western Front in 1917 achieved success in the 1917 Battle of Messines. Later Governor of Mandatory Palestine.

== R ==
- Major-General James Rawlins: British Indian Army Goorkha and Staff Corps officer.
- Major-General Sir Redvers Henry Buller: Veteran soldier of the wars in Africa, commanded the 1st Army Corps in the Second Boer War.
- Field Marshal Lord Roberts: Longtime British Army officer in India and senior commander in the Second Afghan War; commander at one point in the Second Boer War.

== S ==
- Lieutenant General Sir Harry Smith: Senior commander in the Xhosa Wars and the First Sikh War.
- Field Marshal Hugh Rose, 1st Baron Strathnairn: major-general in the Crimean War, then Commander-in-chief in India and then in Ireland.
- Major-General Sir William Penn Symons: Mortally wounded at the Battle of Talana Hill during the Second Boer War.
- General Sir Horace Lockwood Smith-Dorrien, GCB, GCMG, DSO, ADC (26 May 1858 – 12 August 1930) was a British Army General. One of the few British survivors of the Battle of Isandlwana as a young officer, he also distinguished himself in the Second Boer War

== T ==
- General Frederic Thesiger, 2nd Baron Chelmsford

== W ==
- Surgeon Major General John Warren, M.R.C.S. (Army Medical Department, 1893–96): Served with 1st (Royal) Dragoons and in the Second Afghan War with 15th (King’s) Hussars. Then was later present during the Anglo-Egyptian War in 1882 and notably at Suakin in 1885.
- Field Marshal Sir George Stuart White: Quartermaster-General to the Forces (1898–99) and C-in-C in Natal, South Africa at the start of the Second Boer War but his forces were cut off and besieged at Ladysmith.
- Field Marshal Garnet Wolseley, 1st Viscount Wolseley: Victoria Cross winner and commander of expeditionary forces in Africa, serving notably in the Indian Mutiny, Ashanti Wars, Anglo-Egyptian War, and serving as commander of the Gordon Relief Expedition in the Mahdist War.
- Field Marshal Sir Evelyn Wood: Awarded the Victoria Cross during the Indian Mutiny in 1858 and later commanded extensively in the Zulu War and the Mahdist War.
- Major General Sir Edward Robert Prevost Woodgate: Commanded the 11th Infantry Brigade during the Second Boer War until he was mortally wounded at the Battle of Spion Kop.
- General Sir Arthur Singleton Wynne: Commanded 11th Infantry Brigade at the Battle of the Tugela Heights during the Second Boer War.

- Major-General Andrew Gilbert Wauchope CB CMG (5 July 1846 – 11 December 1899) was a British Army officer, killed commanding a brigade at the Battle of Magersfontein in the South African War.
