= General Rawlins =

General Rawlins may refer to:

- Anthony Rawlins (fl. 1980s–2020s), Australian Army major general
- James Rawlins (1823–1905), British Indian Army major general
- John Aaron Rawlins (1831–1869), Union Army brigadier general and brevet major general
- Stuart Blundell Rawlins (1897–1955), British Army major general

== See also ==
- Edwin W. Rawlings (1904–1997), U.S. Air Force general
