= Marillier =

Marillier is a surname. Notable people with the surname include:

- Dougie Marillier (born 1978), Zimbabwean cricketer
- Garance Marillier (born 1998), French actress
- Juliet Marillier (born 1948), New Zealand-born writer of fantasy
- William Marillier (1832–1896), English cricketer

== See also ==
- Marillier shot, a shot in cricket
