= General Carey =

General Carey may refer to:

- George Glas Sandeman Carey (1867–1948), British Army major general
- George Jackson Carey (1822–1872), British Army major general
- Henry Carey, 1st Baron Hunsdon (1526–1596), captain general to Queen Elizabeth
- Joel Carey (fl. 2010s–2020s), U.S. Air Force brigadier general
- Michael Carey (United States Air Force officer) (born 1960), U.S. Air Force major general
- Richard E. Carey (born 1928), U.S. Marine Corps lieutenant general
- Robert Carey (British Army officer) (1821–1883), British Army major general
