= Haileybury Astana =

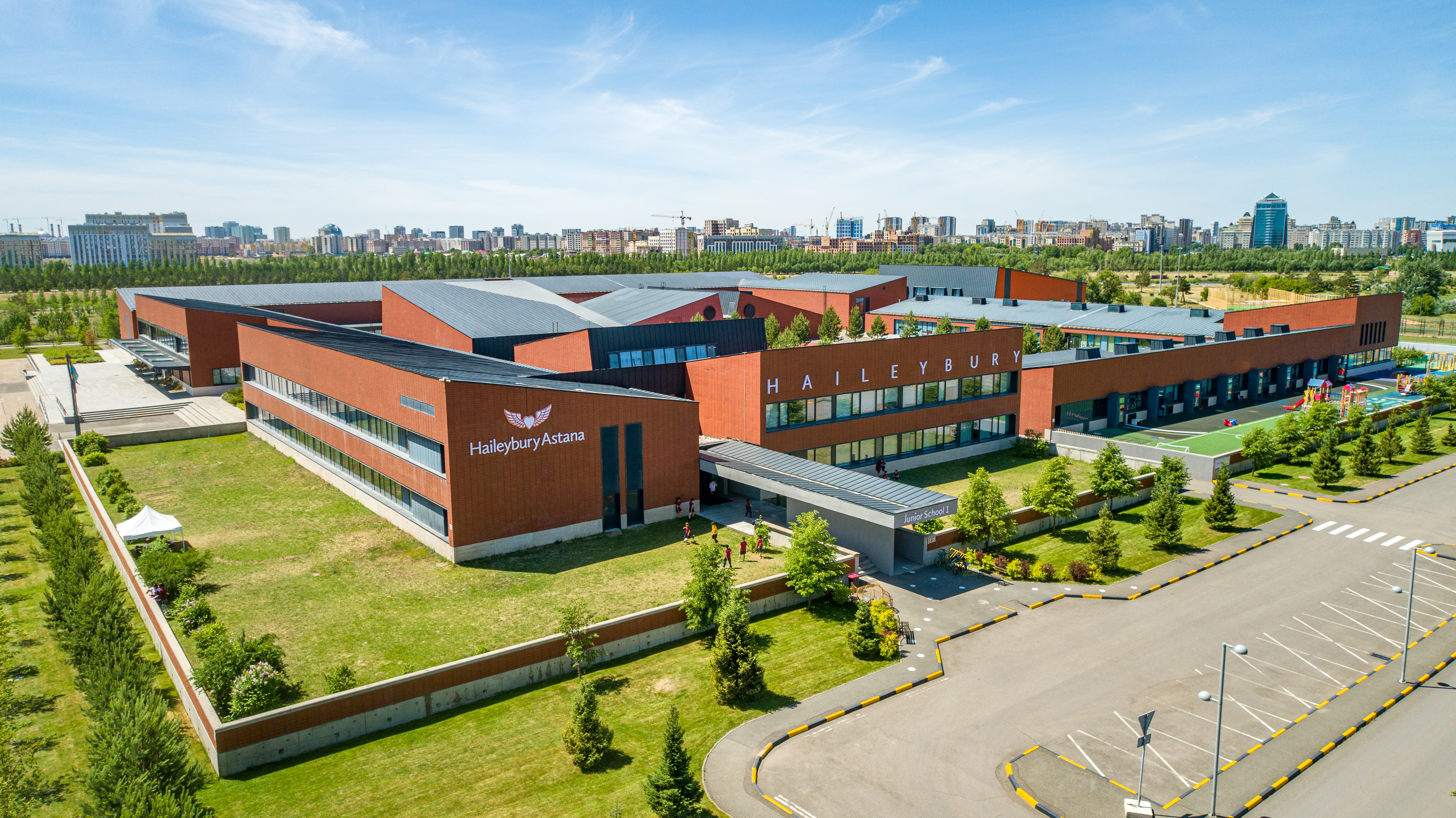

Location
- 4, Panfilov Street; Astana; Kazakhstan; 51.110945°N 71.453147°E

Information
- Type: Independent school
- Motto: Latin: Sursum Corda ("Lift Up Your Hearts")
- Established: 2011
- Sister school: Haileybury Almaty; Haileybury and Imperial Service College
- Headmaster: John Coles
- Gender: Mixed
- Age: 2 to 18
- Enrolment: 650 (approx.)
- Website: http://www.haileybury.kz

Haileybury Astana is a British independent school in Astana, Kazakhstan. It was founded in 2011 as an offshoot of Haileybury, an independent school in England, following the establishment of Haileybury Almaty in 2008. Haileybury Astana follows the UK school curriculum, and senior school pupils are prepared for the International Baccalaureate Diploma Programme (IBDP). As of today, Haileybury is a full member of FOBISIA.

In 2018, Haileybury Astana opened the IB student centre for Year 12-13 International Baccalaureate Diploma Programme (IBDP) students. Each year the school allocates 10 full scholarships for Year 12 students entering the IBDP.
