= The Oracle (1953 film) =

1953 film by C.M. Pennington-Richards

- Original trade ad by Ronald Searle
- Directed by: C. M. Pennington-Richards
- Written by: Patrick Campbell; Anthony Steven (additional dialogue)
- Based on: radio play To Tell You the Truth by Robert Barr
- Produced by: Colin Lesslie
- Starring: Robert Beatty; Michael Medwin; Virginia McKenna.
- Cinematography: Wolfgang Suschitzky
- Edited by: John Trumper
- Music by: Temple Abady
- Production company: Group 3
- Distributed by: Associated British-Pathé (UK)
- Release dates: 1 June 1953 (London, UK)
- Running time: 85 mins
- Country: United Kingdom
- Language: English

The Oracle (known as The Horse's Mouth in the United States) is a 1953 British second feature ('B') comedy film directed by C.M. Pennington-Richards and starring Robert Beatty, Michael Medwin and Virginia McKenna. The film was based on the radio play To Tell You the Truth by Robert Barr. A journalist goes on holiday to Ireland and encounters a fortune-teller.

== Plot ==
Timothy Blake, a British reporter holidaying on a remote island offshore of Ireland, hears a man's voice coming from the bottom of a well. The voice turns out to be a modern-day Oracle, or fortune teller, whose predictions prove uncannily accurate. Bob is determined to get a story out of this, but his editor is less enthusiastic and promptly fires him. The newfound publicity though, means the once-sleepy Irish village is now invaded by curiosity seekers, and those seeking the horse racing results.

== Production ==
The film was shot at Southall Studios on a budget of £43,000.

== Cast ==
- Robert Beatty as Bob Jefferson
- Michael Medwin as Timothy Blake
- Virginia McKenna as Shelagh
- Mervyn Johns as Tom Mitchum
- Arthur Macrae as Alan Digby
- Gillian Lind as Jane Bond
- Ursula Howells as Peggy
- Louise Hampton as Miss Turner
- John Charlesworth as Denis
- Joseph Tomelty as Terry Roche
- Lockwood West as Adams
- Maire O'Neill as Mrs Lenham
- John McBride as Mick
- Derek Tansley as idiot boy
- Patrick McAlinney as O'Keefe
- Lionel Marson as announcer
- Jean St Clair as young girl
- Jack May as old man
- Gilbert Harding as voice of the oracle

== Critical reception ==
Allmovie called the film "A lesser comedy of the Ealing school (though not from the Ealing studios)".

The Radio Times Guide to Films gave the film 2/5 stars, writing: "Gilbert Harding voices the oracle at the bottom of a well in this piffling comedy in which whimsy is heaped on to make up for the absence of genuine humour. Ordinarily, Harding dispenses his wisdom to the inhabitants of a small Irish island. But then journalist Robert Beatty begins using him to predict horse races and other momentous events until the British mainland is reduced to chaos. Celebrated at the time as the rudest man on TV, Harding comes over today as an irascible prig."

In British Sound Films: The Studio Years 1928–1959 David Quinlan rated the film as "average", writing: "Apart from a few shafts at yellow journalism, comedy is resolutely whimsical."
