= Arthur Rawlins =

British Indian army officer (1866–1943)

Arthur Rawlins CIE CBE DSO
- Born: 15 May 1866; Dharamshala, Himachal Pradesh, India
- Died: 16 November 1943 (aged 77); Weston-super-Mare, England
- Military career
- Allegiance: United Kingdom
- Branch: British Army (British Raj) British Indian Army
- Service years: 1888-1921
- Rank: Lieutenant-Colonel
- Commands: Bikaner Camel Corps; 1st Battalion, 24th Punjabis
- Conflicts: Tirah Campaign; China 1900; Dervish War; First World War
- Awards: Companion of the Order of the Indian Empire; Commander of the Order of the British Empire; Distinguished Service Order; Mentioned in Dispatches

Lieutenant-Colonel Arthur Kennedy Rawlins CIE CBE DSO JP (15 May 1866 – 16 November 1943) was a British Indian Army officer.

Rawlins was the son of Major-General James Sebastian Rawlins, a senior officer of the Indian Staff Corps, and Emma Augusta Wilmot Parke. Born in Dharamshala, India, he was educated at Haileybury and Imperial Service College.

He was commissioned into the 3rd Battalion, the Welsh Regiment, as a Second Lieutenant 11 April 1888. He was promoted Lieutenant 22 June 1889.

He obtained a regular commission, as a Second Lieutenant, into the East Surrey Regiment on 21 December 1889 from the Militia, but transferred to the Indian Staff Corps in 1892. He was promoted to Lieutenant on 19 May 1892. Rawlins fought in the North-West Frontier between 1897 - 1898, notably being involved in the Tirah Campaign with the 11th Regiment of Punjab Infantry, later the 24th Punjabis and on 20 May 1898 was made a Companion of Distinguished Service Order.

He served in China in 1900.

He was deployed in the Dervish war between 1903 and 1904 and saw action at Jidballi and was Mentioned in Dispatches in the London Gazette 2 September 1904.

He was promoted Major on 21 December 1907. He was promoted Lieut-Colonel 22 December 1915.

He served with Imperial Service Troops, commanding the Bikaner Camel Corps, throughout the First World War. He was Mentioned in Dispatches in the London Gazette four times during the war.

Rawlins later served in Salonika and the Russian Transcaucasia, being promoted to Lieutenant-Colonel and taking command of the regiment. On 6 January 1919 he was made a Commander of the Order of the British Empire, having already been made a Companion of the Order of the Indian Empire in recognition of his services with the Indian Army on 25 August 1916.

Following his retirement from the Army, Rawlins moved to England and lived at Weston-super-Mare, where he was a Justice of the Peace. He died unmarried in 1943. Rawlins was the great-uncle of Kenneth Spring.
