= Haileybury Almaty =

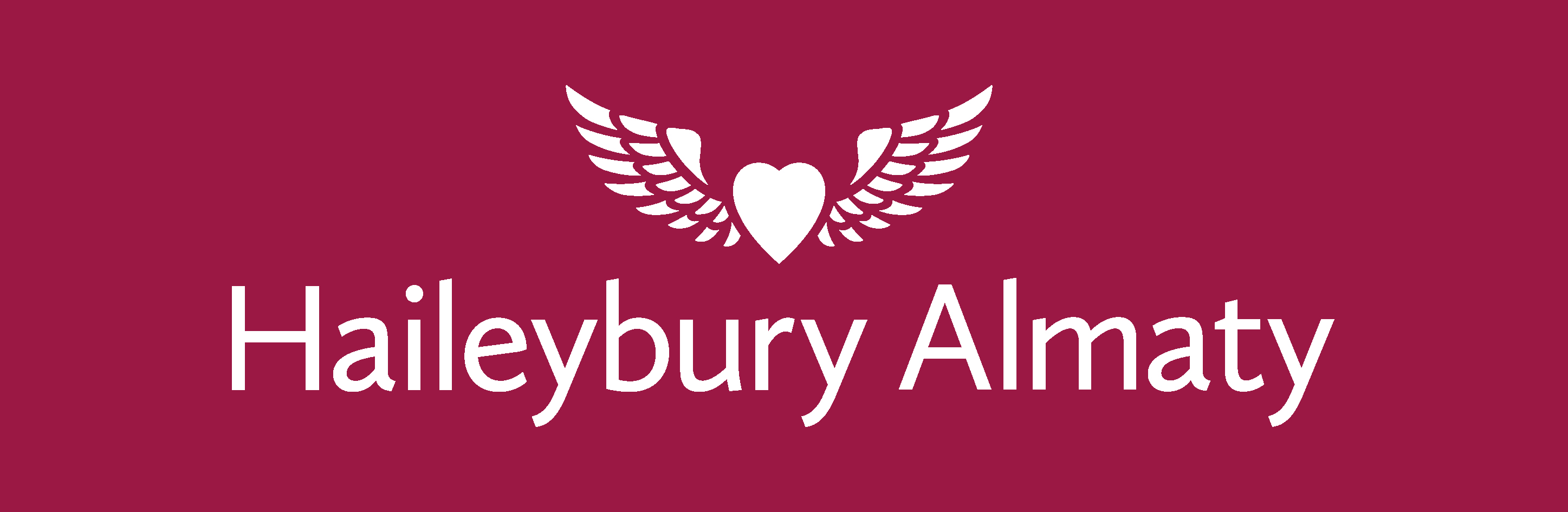

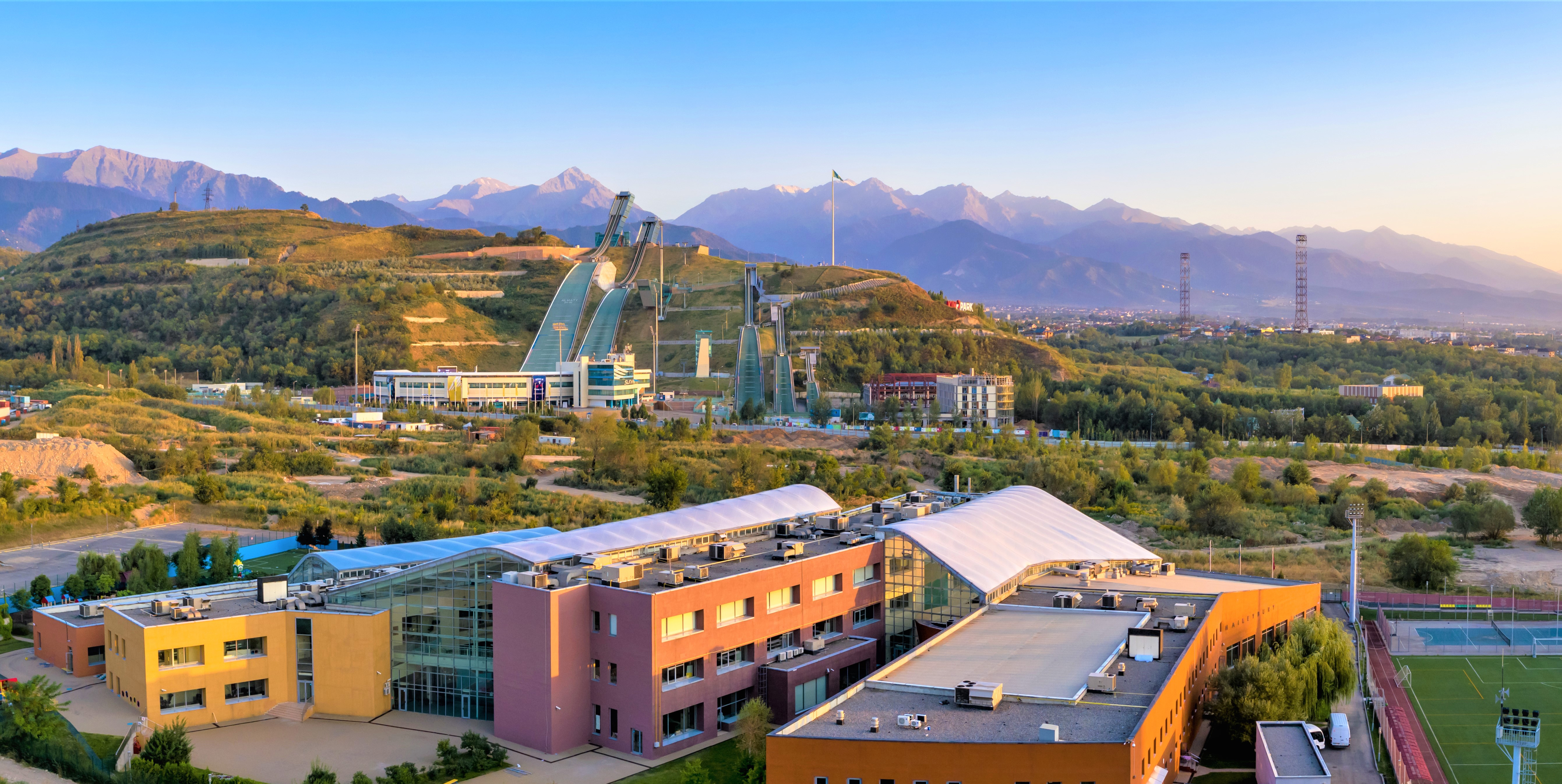

Location
- Al-Farabi Avenue, 112; Almaty, Kazakhstan
- 43.217281°N 76.933651°E

Information
- Type: FOBISIA school; Boarding school; Private school
- Established: 2008
- Sister school: Haileybury Astana; Haileybury and Imperial Service College
- Headmaster: Simon Mills
- Rival: Haileybury Astana
- Website: http://www.haileybury.kz
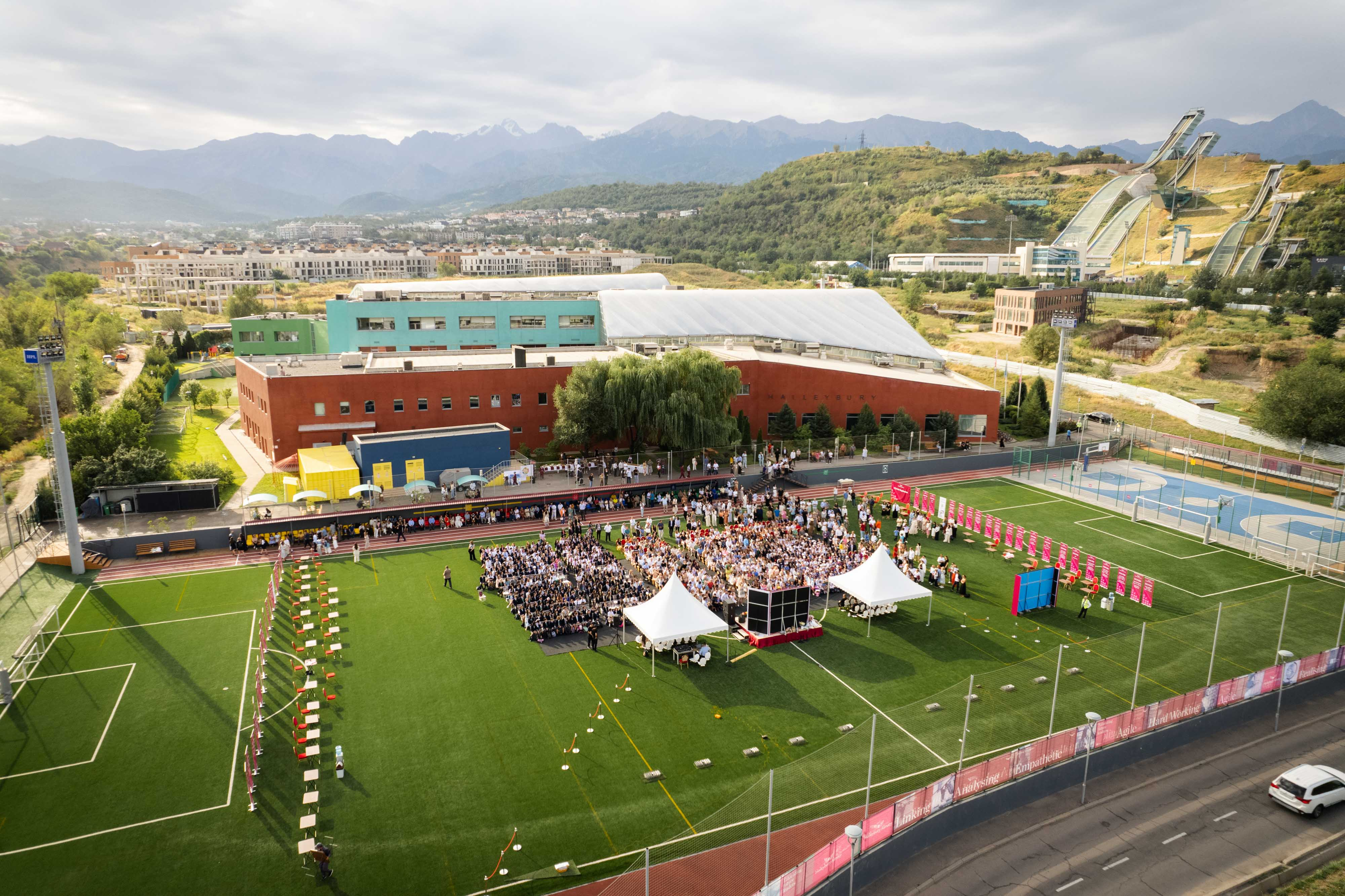
- The sky view of HBA

Haileybury Almaty commonly known as HBA is an international boarding school in Almaty, Kazakhstan. It is a licensed franchise of Haileybury, an English public school. In September 2008 HBA was officially opened by the Mayor of Almaty and Kazakhstan government education officials. When it opened, it was the first British public school in Central Asia.

As of today, HBA is a full member of the Federation of British International Schools in Asia(FOBISIA).

== History ==
HBA was established in 2007 with the laying of the first stone of its building. It officially opened its doors to students in September 2008, with the inauguration ceremony attended by the Mayor of Almaty. In its early years, Haileybury Almaty hosted distinguished guests, including the first president of Kazakhstan, Nursultan Nazarbayev, and the UK Minister of Higher Education, David Lammy MP.

Between 2010 and 2015, the school experienced significant growth and expansion, offering a wider range of academic programs and extracurricular activities. It also hosted notable figures like Prince Michael of Kent, David Beckham, and Sir Roger Moore.

From 2015 to 2020, HBA embraced innovation and technology integration into the learning experience, focusing on 21st-century skills like critical thinking, creativity, and digital literacy.

== FOBISIA ==
HBA joined FOBISIA in 2019, and is accredited by an approved inspectorate. The school had hosted and won many FOBISIA events in the past, both academic and sports competitions. In FOBISIA, where there are 3 regional subdivisions, region A, B, and C, HBA is labelled as region C.

== Curriculum ==
HBA follows a National Curriculum for England, and offers IGCSE and A Levels. The school teaches pupils from 5–18 years of age and follows the English National Curriculum, which is adapted for local context. Every pupil at Haileybury schools in Kazakhstan is assigned to one of four Houses within the school: Attlee, Bartle Frere, Edmonstone or Kipling.

The school library has a collection of over 10,000 books and DVDs in English, Russian, and Kazakh.

== Sister schools ==
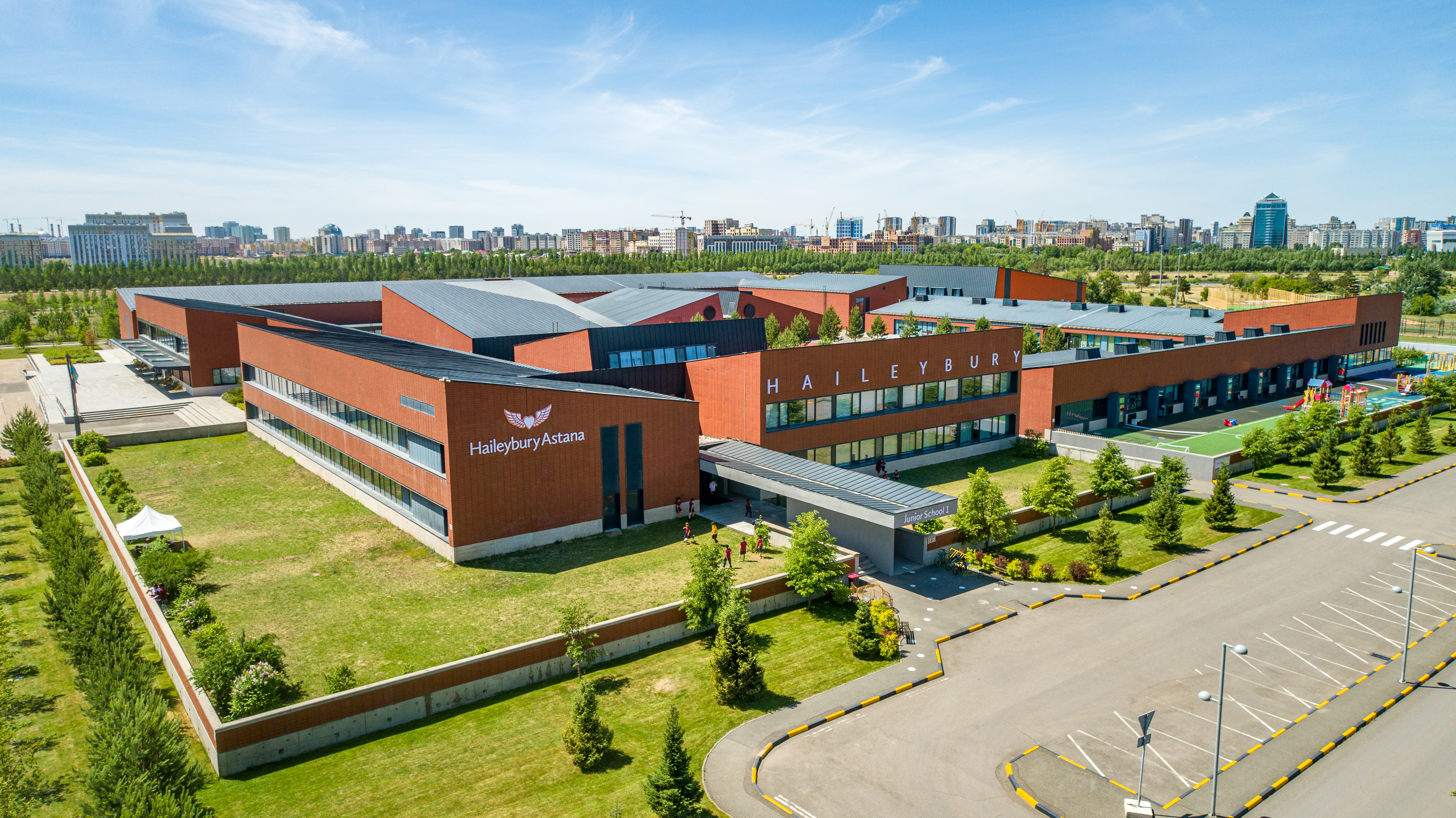
Haileybury Astana

Haileybury Almaty has 2 sister schools Eurasia-wide, Haileybury Imperial College & Haileybury Astana. Haileybury College is located in England, UK, and Haileybury Astana in Astana, Kazakhstan.

== Gallery ==
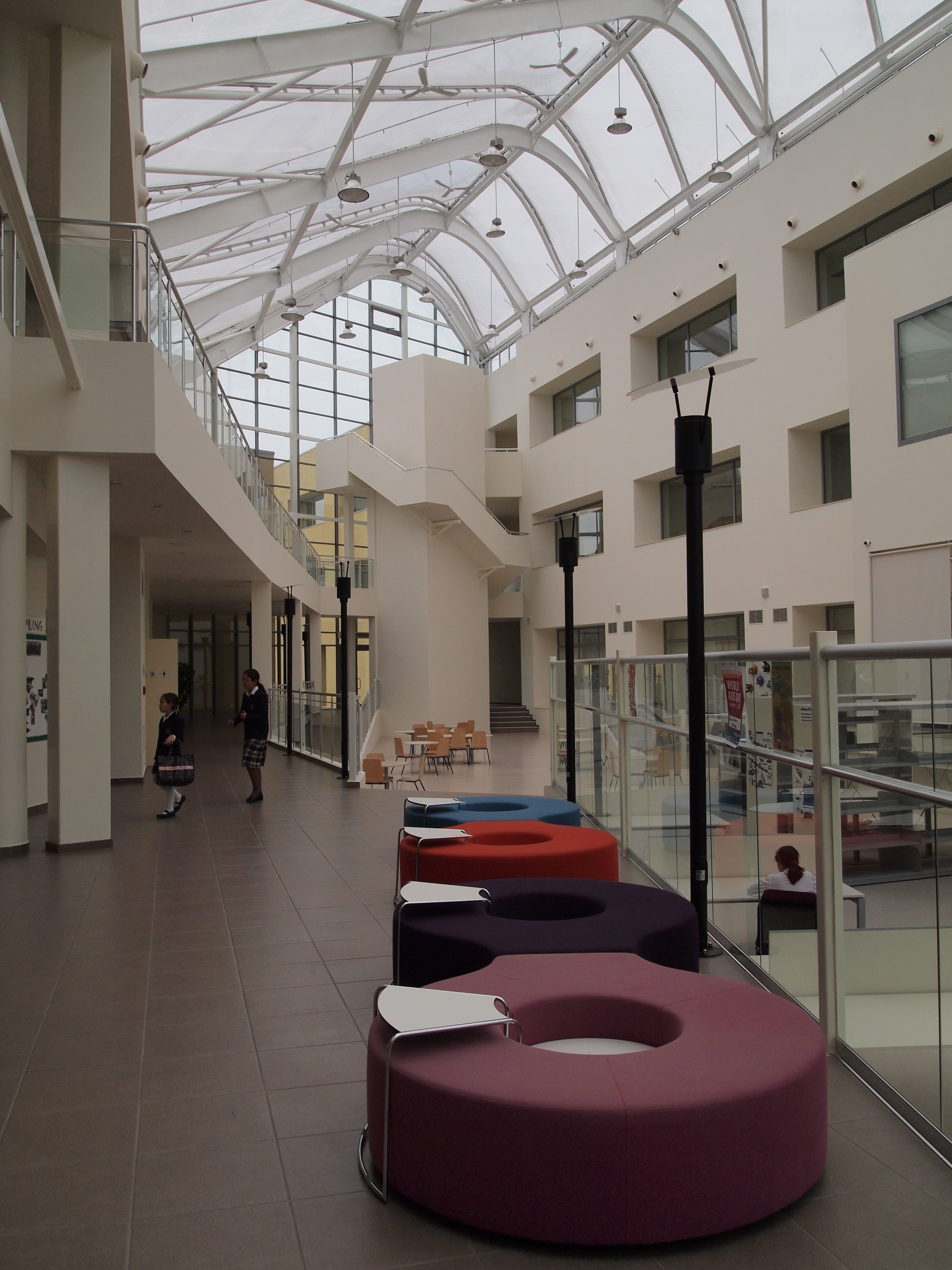
Haileybury Almaty atrium area

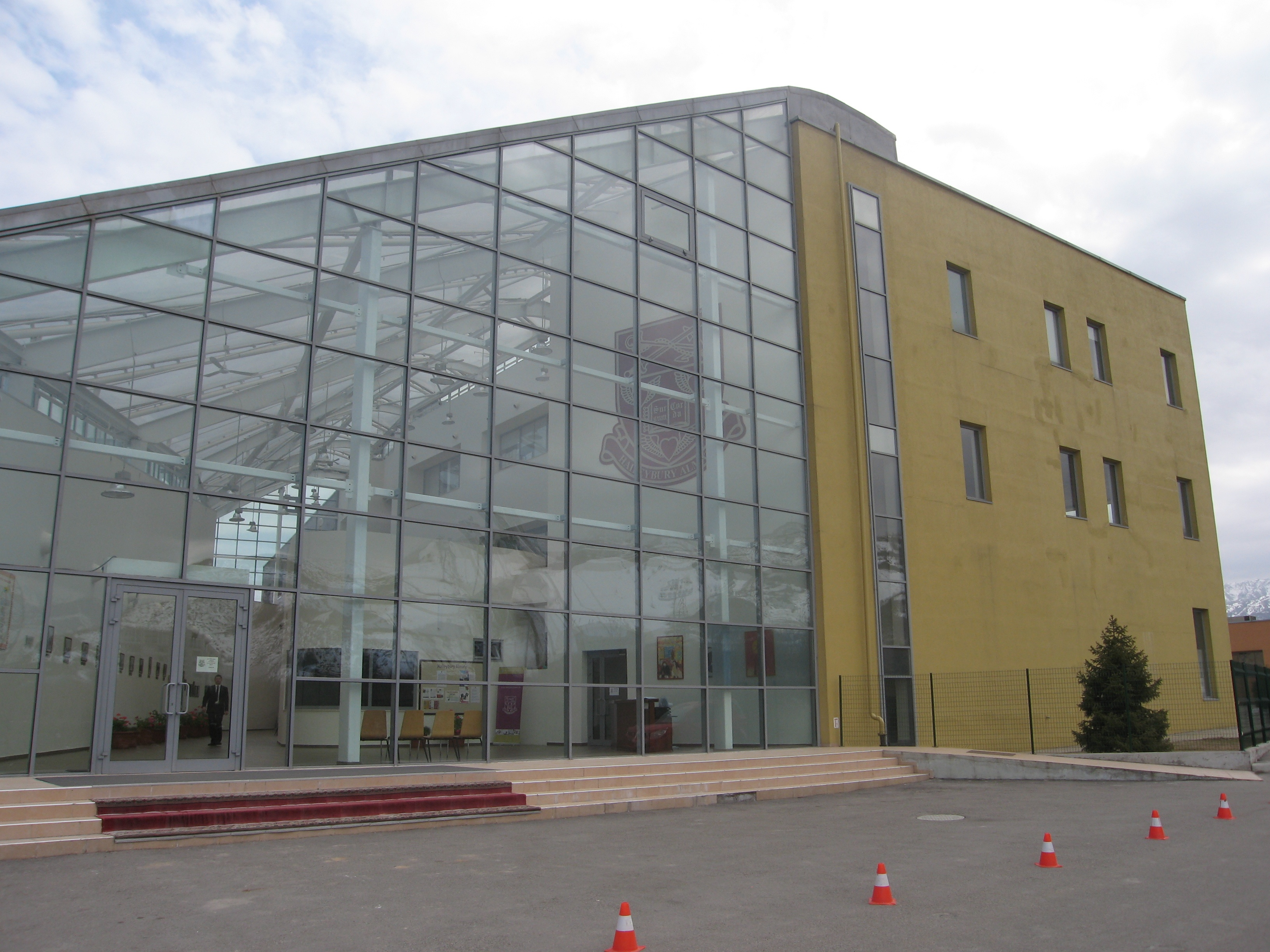
Haileybury Almaty main entrance

Another logo of Haileybury Almaty

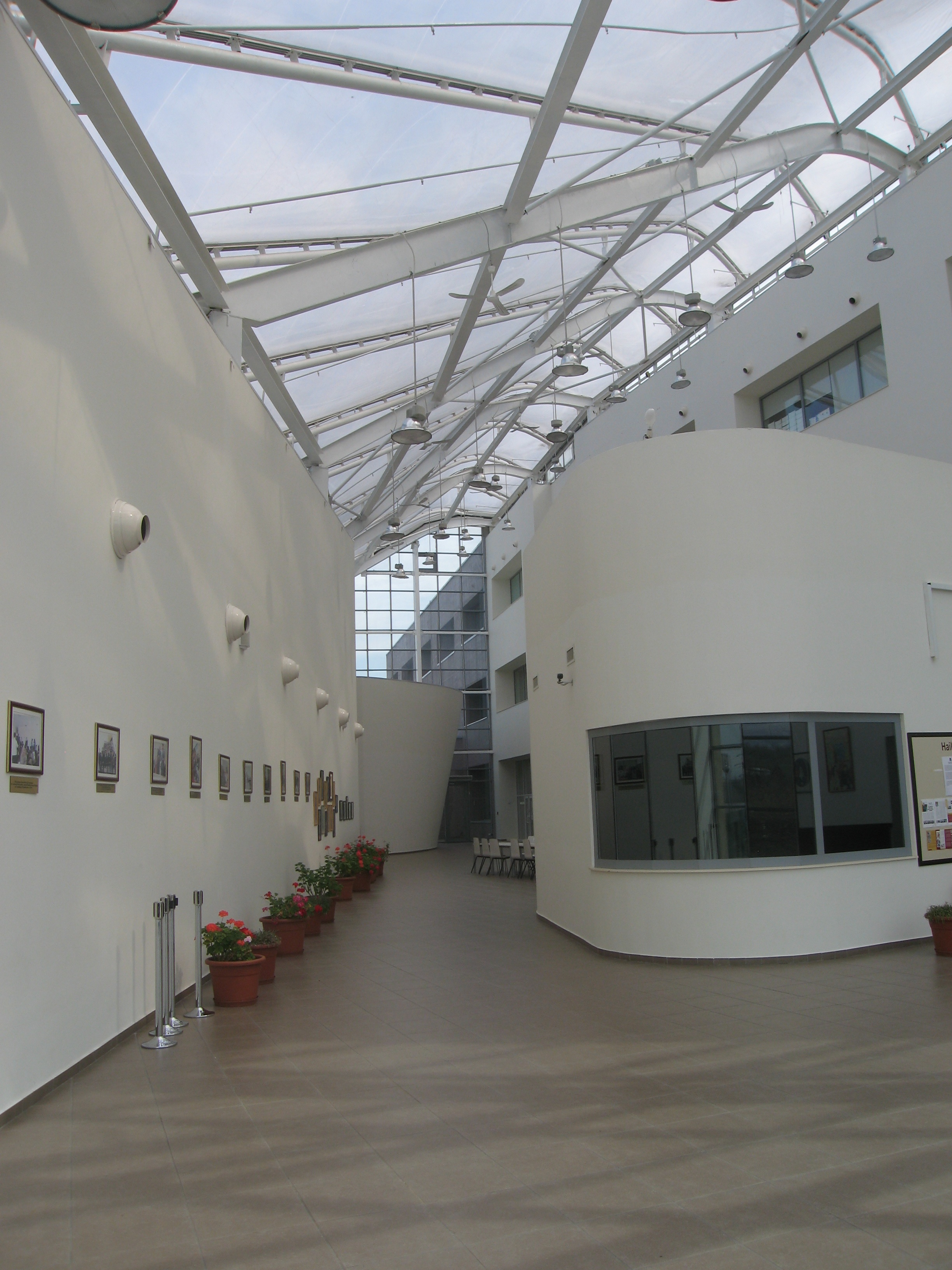
Haileybury Almaty main reception corridor

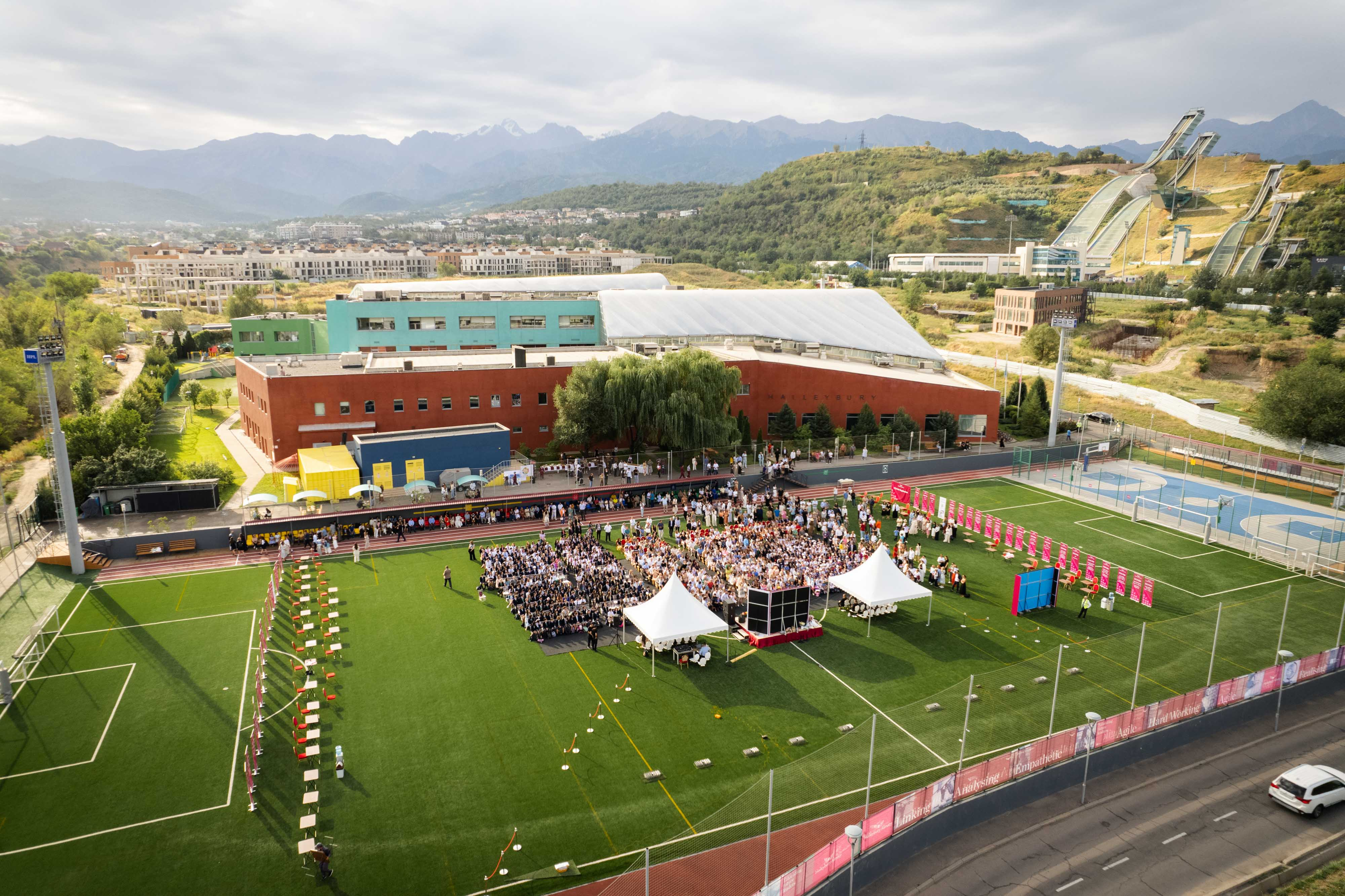
Haileybury Almaty sky view

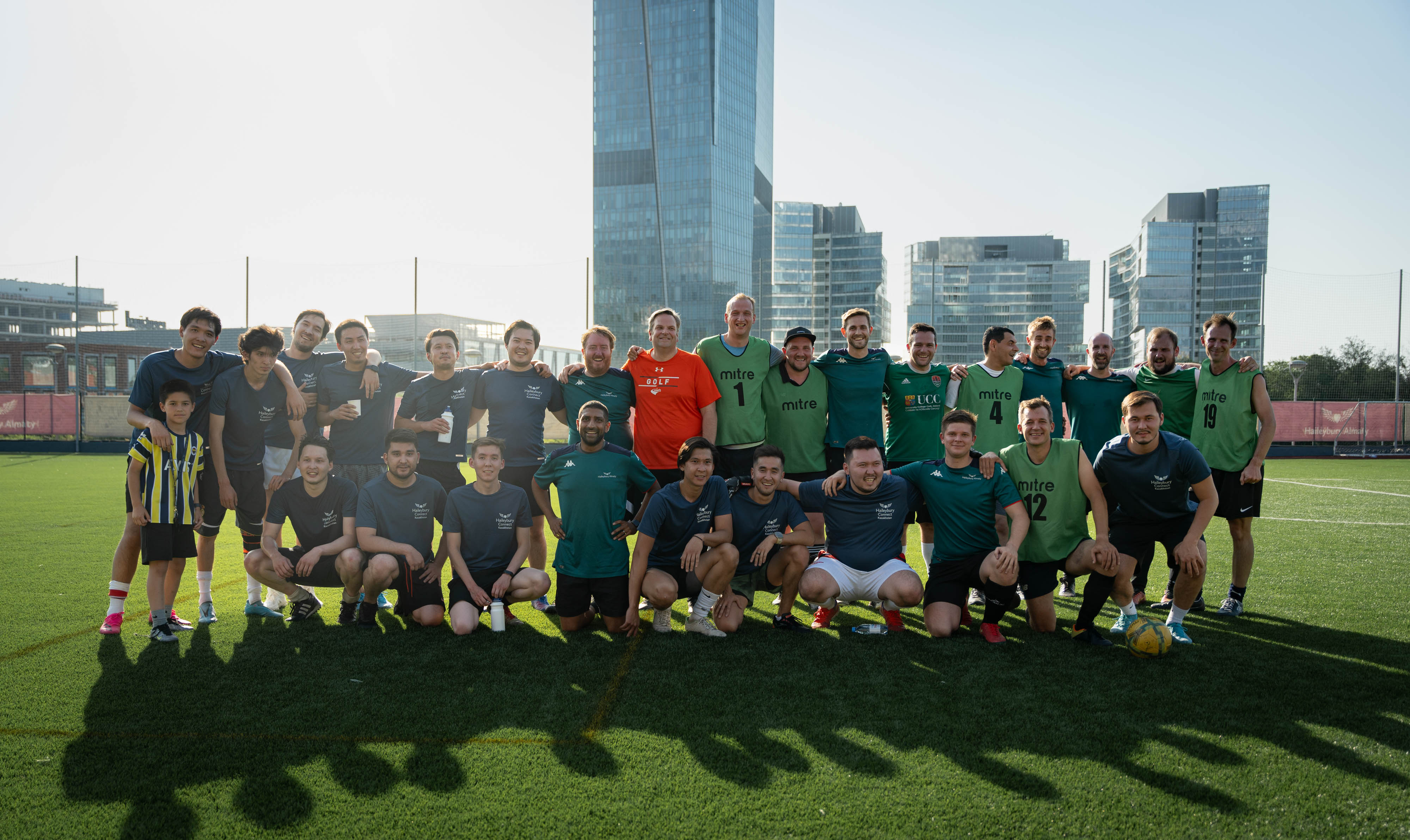
Haileybury alumni vs staff football match

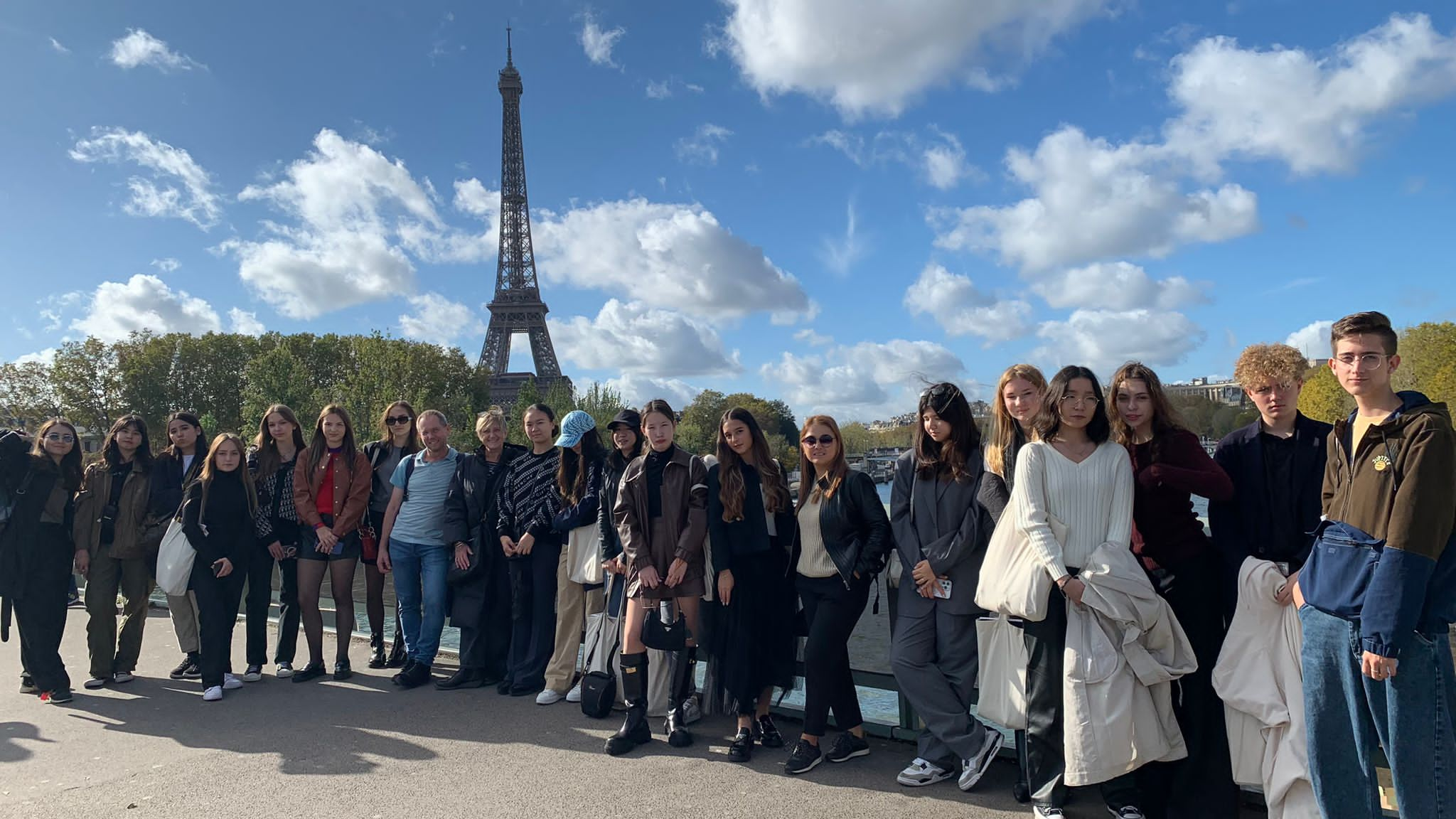
Haileybury Almaty school trip to Paris

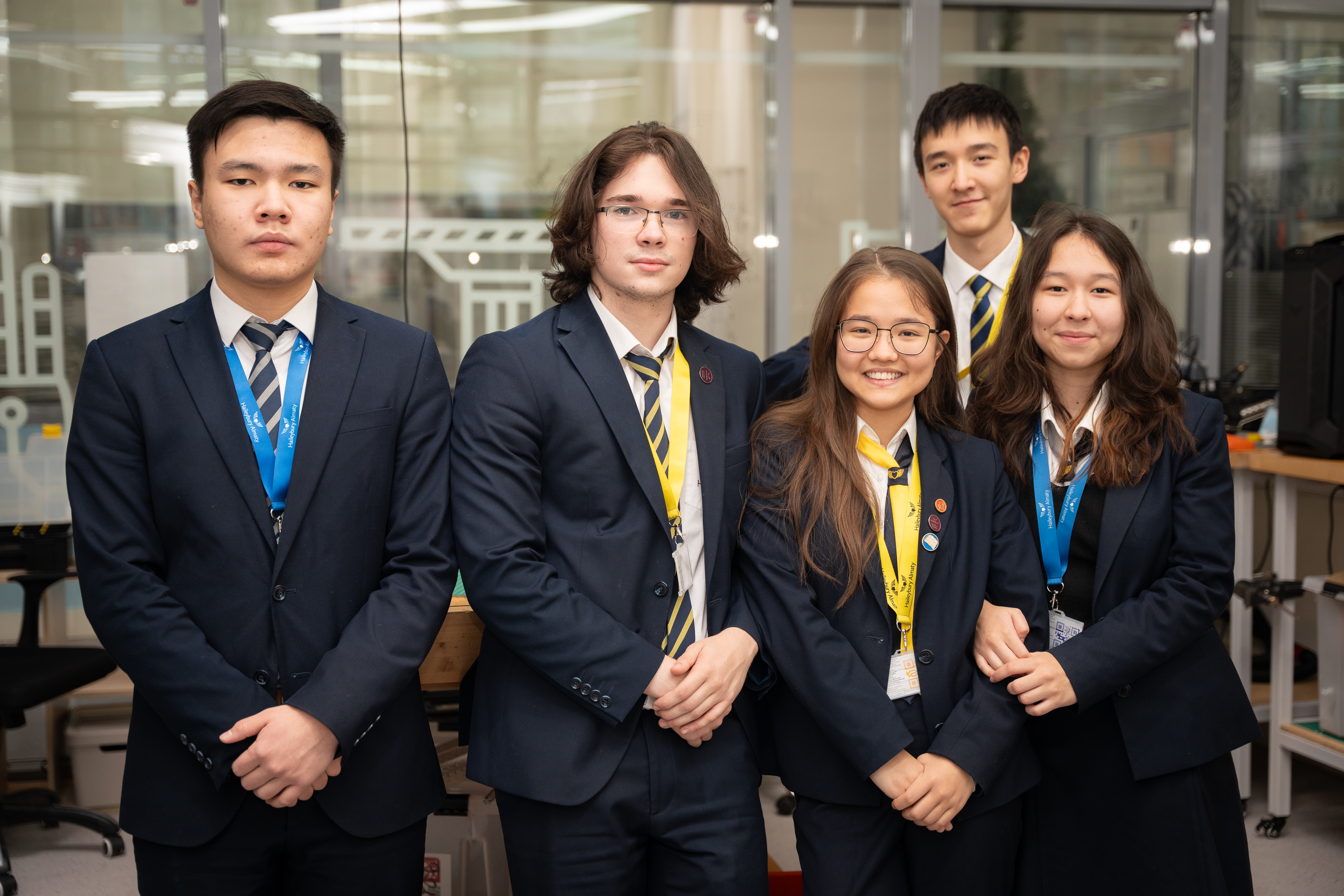
Haileybury Almaty scholars

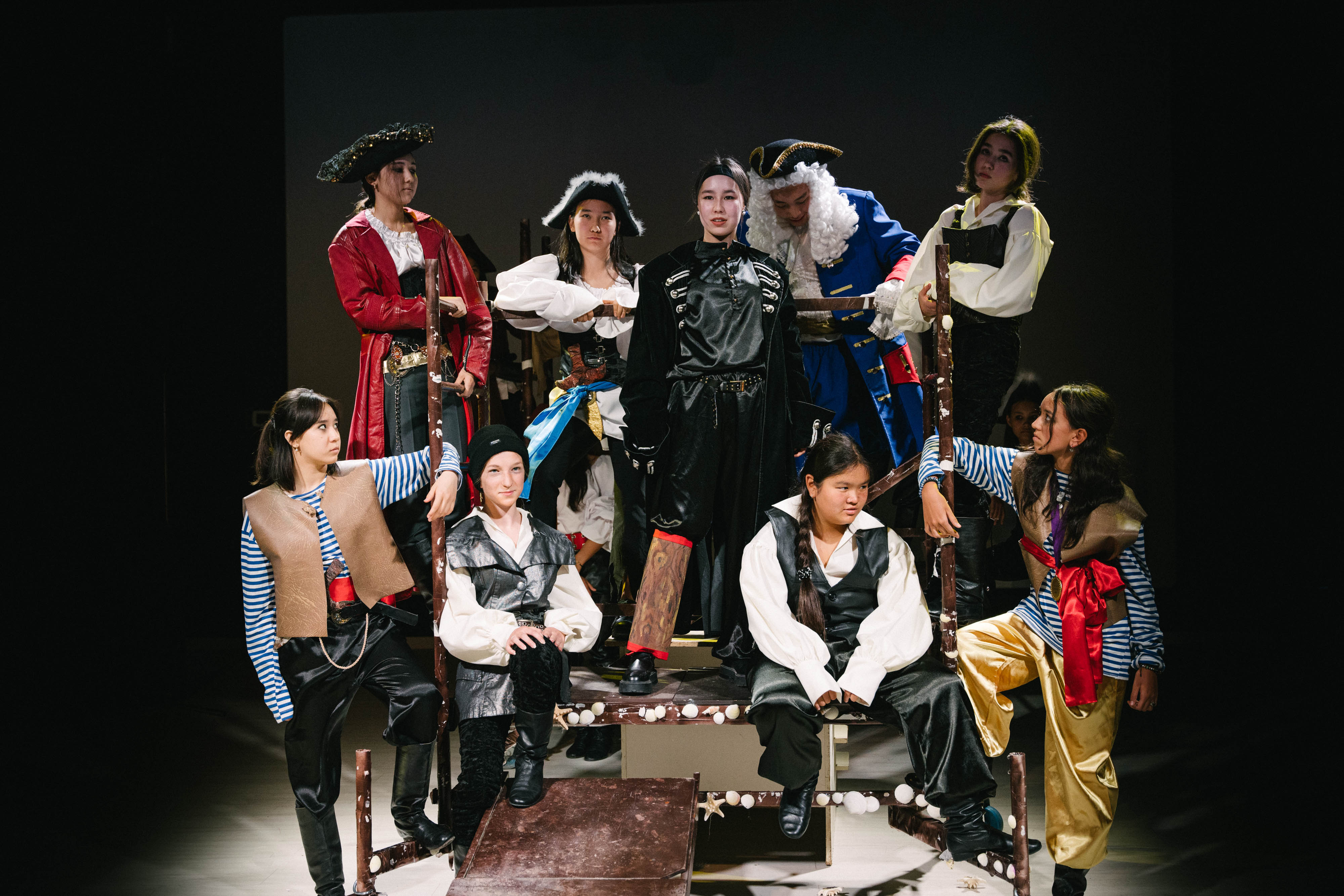
Haileybury Almaty drama performance

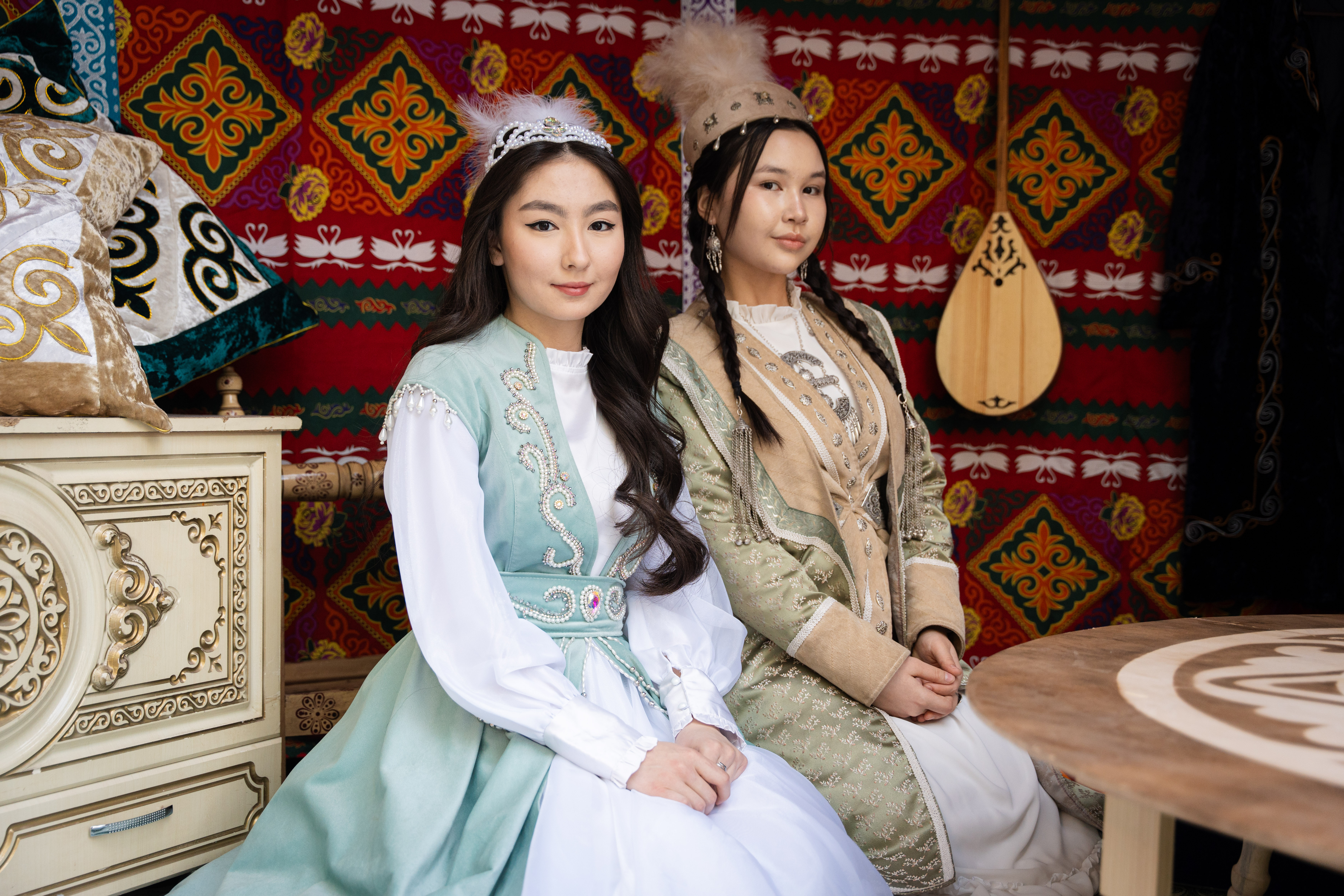
Haileybury Almaty Nauryz celebration
