= Bill Tyrwhitt-Drake =

English cricketer

Personal information
- Full name: Thomas William Tyrwhitt-Drake
- Born: 5 November 1926; Paddington, London, England
- Died: 8 March 2008 (aged 81); Sidcup, Kent, England
- Batting: Right-handed

Domestic team information
- Years: Team
- 1946–1948: Cambridge University
- 1946–1958: Hertfordshire

Career statistics
| Competition | First-class |
|---|---|
| Matches | 4 |
| Runs scored | 122 |
| Batting average | 15.25 |
| 100s/50s | –/– |
| Top score | 38 |
| Catches/stumpings | 1/– |
- Source: Cricinfo, 31 May 2019

Thomas William Tyrwhitt-Drake (5 November 1926 – 8 March 2008) was an English first-class cricketer.

Tyrwhitt-Drake was born at Paddington in November 1926, to Reverend Charles William Tyrwhitt-Drake. He was educated at Haileybury, before going up to Trinity College, Cambridge. While studying at Cambridge he made his debut in first-class cricket for Cambridge University against Somerset at Bath in 1946. He made two further first-class appearances for Cambridge University, playing against the Marylebone Cricket Club in 1946 and Leicestershire in 1948. He scored 73 runs for Cambridge across six innings, with a top score of 33. Eleven years later he made a final appearance in first-class cricket for the Free Foresters against Oxford University. In addition to playing first-class cricket, Tyrwhitt-Drake also played minor counties cricket for Hertfordshire from 1946–58, making 85 appearances in the Minor Counties Championship.

He graduated from Trinity with a master's degree in 1949, and married Muriel Ann Makgill in September 1955, with the couple having three children. He died at Sidcup in March 2008.
