= Lionel Marson =

English cricketer, British Army officer and actor

Personal information
- Full name: Lionel Frederick Marson
- Born: 15 June 1895; Wandsworth, Surrey, England
- Died: 31 March 1960 (aged 64); Melrose, Roxburghshire, Scotland
- Batting: Right-handed

Domestic team information
- Years: Team
- 1926–1927: Wiltshire

Career statistics
Competition	First-class
Matches	1
Runs scored	56
Batting average	28.00
100s/50s	–/–
Top score	23
Catches/stumpings	1/–
- Source: Cricinfo, 28 June 2019

Lionel Frederick Marson MC (15 June 1895 – 31 March 1960) was an English first-class cricketer, British Army officer and actor. Marson was commissioned into the 4th Royal Irish Dragoon Guards, serving in the First World War in which he was awarded the Military Cross. He was seconded into the Royal Air Force between 1918 and 1926, before returning to the Irish Dragoons and retiring from active service in 1930. The final year of his military service saw him play first-class cricket for the British Army cricket team. After retiring he became a radio announcer and an actor, starring in several minor roles. As an announcer for the BBC Home Service, he made the first announcement of the German Invasion of Poland.

== Early life and military career ==
Marson was born at Wandsworth in June 1895. He was educated at Haileybury, before attending the Royal Military College, Sandhurst. He graduated from Sandhurst in September 1914, entering into the 4th Royal Irish Dragoon Guards as a second lieutenant. Serving in the First World War, he was promoted to the rank of lieutenant in November 1915. He was awarded the Military Cross in January 1918, for conspicuous gallantry and devotion to duty when attacking a house. He was made a temporary captain in September 1918, while in charge of a contingent of officer cadets at Sandhurst.

He was seconded to the Royal Air Force in October 1918, with Marson relinquishing the temporary rank of captain in April 1919. He was promoted to the full rank of captain in April 1920, before being granted a temporary commission as a flying officer (honorary flight lieutenant) in the Royal Air Force in October 1922, having been seconded for four years.

== Later military career and acting ==
He relinquished his commission in the Royal Air Force upon his return to the Irish Dragoon Guards in October 1926. He made his debut in minor counties cricket for Wiltshire in the 1926 Minor Counties Championship, with Marson playing minor counties cricket for Wiltshire until 1927, making a total of sixteen appearances. He made a single appearance in first-class cricket for the British Army cricket team against the Marylebone Cricket Club at Lord's in 1930. Batting twice in the match, Marson was dismissed for 3 runs in the Army first-innings by Bill Bowes, while in their second-innings he was their top-scorer, making 53 runs before being dismissed by Sid Pegler. He retired from active service in November 1930.

Following his retirement, Marson took up acting. He attended the Royal Academy of Dramatic Art and graduated in 1933. After graduating he worked as news announcer for the BBC Home Service. He announced the German Invasion of Poland in September 1939. His on-screen acting credits included Billy Bunter of Greyfriars School (1952), The Oracle (1953), and The Three Golden Nobles (1959). He died at Melrose in Scotland in March 1960.
