= Patrick Keen =

English cricketer and soldier

Personal information
- Full name: Patrick John Keen
- Born: 30 June 1911; Kohat, North-West Frontier Province, British India
- Died: 8 March 1983 (aged 71); Hampshire, England
- Batting: Unknown

Domestic team information
- Years: Team
- 1939/40: Europeans

Career statistics
Competition	First-class
Matches	1
Runs scored	1
Batting average	0.50
100s/50s	–/–
Top score	1
Catches/stumpings	–/–
- Source: Cricinfo, 16 December 2023

Patrick John Keen CMG MBE (30 June 1911 – 8 March 1983) was an English first-class cricketer and an officer in the Indian Political Service, having previously served in both the British Army and the British Indian Army.

== Life and military career ==
The son of the Brigadier P. H. Keen, he was born in British India at Kohat on 30 June 1911. He came from a family of colonial administrators in India, with his grandfather and uncle both holding positions in the Indian Political Department. Keen was educated in England at Haileybury, before attending the Royal Military College, Sandhurst. From there, he was commissioned into the Hampshire Regiment as a second lieutenant in January 1931, with promotion to lieutenant following in January 1934. He was appointed to the British Indian Army as an aide-de-camp to Sir Ralph Griffith, Governors of the North-West Frontier Province. He was promoted to lieutenant in the British Indian Army October 1936, with promotion to captain following in January 1939. In India, Keen made a single appearance in first-class cricket for the Europeans cricket team against the Indians at Madras in the 1939–40 Madras Presidency Match. Batting twice in the match, he was dismissed for a single run in the Europeans first innings by A. G. Ram Singh, while in their second innings he was dismissed without scoring by C. K. Nayudu.

Keen was a member of the Indian Political Service during the Second World War, being assistant-director of the Intelligence Bureau at Quetta. In May 1943, he was appointed to be His Majesty's vice-consul at Bushehr. He was made an MBE in the 1944 New Year Honours. After the end of the war, he was promoted to major in December 1949, having retired from the British Indian Army following Indian Independence. He was later made a Companion of the Order of St Michael and St George in the 1968 New Year Honours for his post-war work with the Foreign Office. Keen later retired to Hampshire, where he died in March 1983. He was married to Anna Cunitia Gordon-Smith of Stansted Park, with the couple marrying at St James' Church in Emsworth in January 1958.
