= William Marillier =

English cricketer

Personal information
- Full name: William Marillier
- Born: c. 1832; Harrow, Middlesex, England
- Died: 3 January 1896 (aged 63/64); Croydon, Surrey, England
- Batting: Unknown

Career statistics
| Competition | First-class |
|---|---|
| Matches | 3 |
| Runs scored | 15 |
| Batting average | 3.75 |
| 100s/50s | –/– |
| Top score | 11 |
| Catches/stumpings | 1/– |
- Source: Cricinfo, 16 August 2019

William Marillier (c. 1832 – 3 January 1896) was an English first-class cricketer.

The son of the Harrow School master J. F. Marillier, he was born at Harrow in 1832. He was educated at Harrow School, before transferring to Haileybury. He was noted for saving the life of an E. W. Craigie while skating in Harrow Park, for which he was awarded. He played first-class cricket for the Gentlemen of England between 1853–56, playing three matches against the Gentlemen of Kent, the Gentlemen of Kent and Surrey and the Gentlemen of Surrey and Sussex. He later became a schoolteacher, holding the post of master of Rotherhithe Grammar School from 1853–89, after which he worked as the librarian of Rotherhithe Free Library from 1890 until his death at Croydon in January 1896.
