= Robert Carey (British Army officer) =

British Army general (1821–1883)

Major-general Robert Carey CB
- Born: 12 December 1821
- Died: 25 January 1883 (aged 61)
- Military career
- Allegiance: United Kingdom
- Branch: British Army
- Service years: 1839–1866
- Rank: Major-general
- Conflicts: Afghan War; Punjab and First Sikh War; Crimean War; New Zealand Wars; First Taranaki War; Invasion of the Waikato; Battle of Rangiriri; Second Taranaki War
- Awards: Companion of the Order of the Bath

Major-general Robert Carey CB (12 December 1821 – 25 January 1883) was an officer of the British Army and served as colonel in the New Zealand Wars.

== Biography ==
=== Youth ===
Robert Carey was born to Octavius Carey and Harriot Hirzel Carey (née Le Marchant) of Castel, Guernsey on 12 December 1821. He was educated there at Elizabeth College from 1833 to 1834.. He then attended the Royal Military College.

=== Afghanistan and Punjab ===
In 1839 he was gazetted as an ensign in the 40th Regiment. He was promoted to lieutenant in 1841, and from 1841 to 1842 served in the Afghan war with Sir William Nott's force, taking part in the actions of Bolan Pass, Khojak Pass, Quetta, Ghuznee, and Kandahar. He participated in the relief of Killar Shilgie, the occupation of Kabul, and in further actions at Kabul and Khyber Pass (Punjab and First Sikh War). He was awarded clasps for Kandahar, Ghuznee and Kabul, and received the 1842 Afghan medal.

=== Crimea ===
Carey was promoted to captain in 1847, and in 1854 served in the Crimean War as the acting quartermaster-general with the Turkish Contingent, and then commanding a Brigade (brevet of major). He was awarded the 4th class Medjidie and the Turkish medal.

=== Promotions and marriage ===
He was promoted to major in 1856, and on 31 December of that same year married Caroline Le Marchant, with whom he had three sons; Robert, Denis and Walter. In 1859 he was promoted to lieutenant-colonel.

=== Australia and New Zealand ===
Carey served as deputy adjutant general (DAG) in Australia in 1860, and served in the New Zealand Wars of 1860–1861 in New Zealand where he was recognised for his services as a Companion in the Most Honourable Order of the Bath. He was DAG for the forces in the Waikato district in 1863, and was promoted to colonel for the action of Rangiriri in the Invasion of the Waikato of 1863–1865, and also in the actions at Paterangi, Te Awamutu, Orakau, Pukehinahina and Mukimam. He was involved in the Campaign of 1866, including the capture of Otapawa and Waikato, and operations around Mount Egmont in the Second Taranaki War, and was awarded a medal.

=== Retirement ===
Carey retired as major general in 1866. He served as deputy judge advocate at headquarters from 1870 to 1882, and was a recipient of the Distinguished Service Award.

=== Death ===
Carey died on 25 January 1883, aged 61.
