= James Rawlins =

James Rawlins CB CIE
- Born: 18 March 1823; Staplegrove, Somerset, England
- Died: 18 October 1905 Ellenborough Park, Weston-super-Mare, England
- Allegiance: United Kingdom
- Branch: British Indian Army
- Rank: Major General
- Commands: 1st Goorkha Regiment
- Conflicts: Indian Rebellion of 1857; Perak War; Second Afghan War
- Awards: Companion of the Order of the Bath, Companion of the Order of the Indian Empire

Major General James Sebastian Rawlins CB CIE (18 March 1823 – 18 October 1905) was a senior British Indian Army officer during the second half of the nineteenth century.

Rawlins was educated at Harrow School and Addiscombe Military Seminary. He commissioned into an East India Company regiment, the 44th Regiment, Bengal Native Infantry on 20 December 1844. A captain by the time of the Indian Rebellion of 1857, Rawlins was shut up for several months in Agra Fort following the mutiny there by native soldiers of his own regiment. The 44th Bengal Native Infantry was disbanded following the Rebellion, and Rawlins transferred to the new Indian Staff Corps in 1861, now part of the British Indian Army. He was promoted to Major on 10 June 1863. After becoming a Lieutenant-Colonel in 1869, Rawlins transferred to the 1st Goorkha Regiment to become its commanding officer. He oversaw the regiment's first overseas deployment, to British Malaya in 1875 during the Perak War, after which he was made a Companion of the Order of the Bath. Shortly afterwards the regiment took part in the Second Afghan War in 1878 where, under Rawlins, they were part of the 2nd Infantry Brigade and won the Theatre Honour "Afghanistan 1878–80". Rawlins subsequently returned to the Staff Corps, rising to the rank of Major General and being made a Companion of the Order of the Indian Empire for his services.

Following his retirement he returned to England and bought Ellenborough Park, near Weston-super-Mare. He had married Emma Augusta Wilmot Parke, daughter of Major George Thomas Parke, in 1854 at Bath, Somerset. Together they had twelve children, one of which was Arthur Rawlins. He died on the 18 October 1905.
