= Haileybury and Imperial Service College =

Public school in Hertfordshire, England

Haileybury
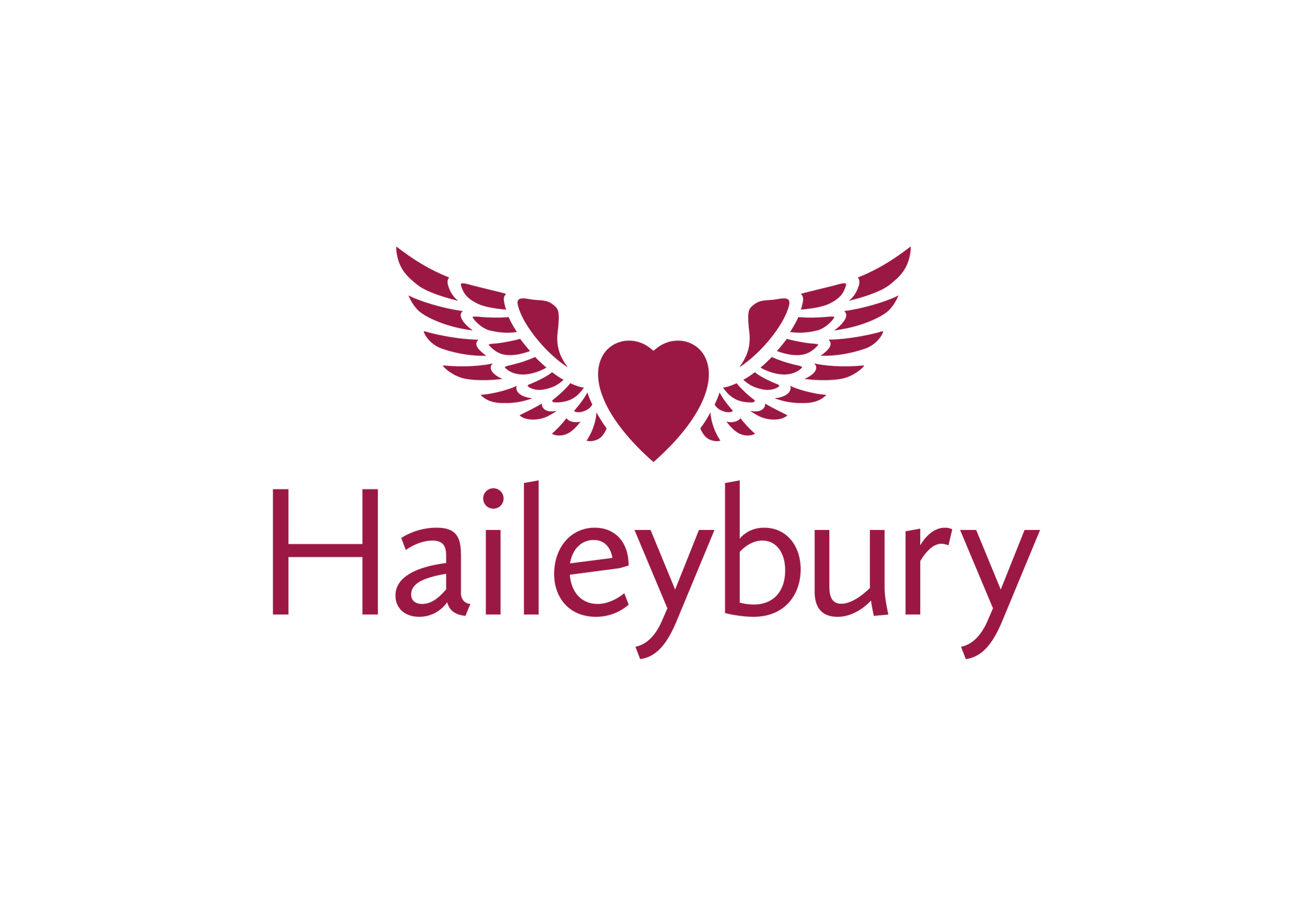

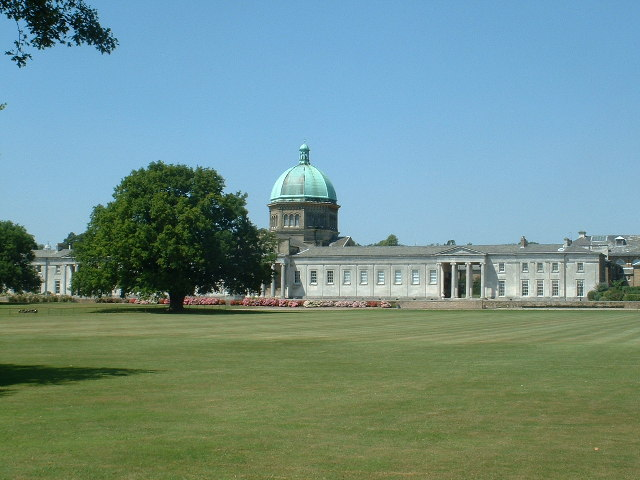

Location
- Hertford Heath, Hertfordshire, SG13 7NU; England; 51.7787°N 0.0333°W

Information
- Type: Private school; Boarding school; Day school; Public school
- Religious affiliation: Church of England
- Established: 1862; 164 years ago
- Sister school: Haileybury Almaty; Haileybury Astana
- Department for Education URN: 117607 Tables
- President: Bishop of St Albans
- Visitor: Archbishop of Canterbury
- Chairman of the Council: Alan Pilgrim
- Master: Eugene du Toit
- Gender: Co-educational
- Age: 11 to 18
- Enrolment: c. 890 pupils
- Houses: 13
- Alumni: Old Haileyburians (OHs)
- Website: haileybury.com

Haileybury is a co-educational private school with boarding and day school facilities for 11-to-18-year-olds located in Hertford Heath, Hertfordshire. It is a member of the Rugby Group and enrols pupils at the 11+, 13+ and 16+ stages of education. Over 890 pupils attend Haileybury, of whom more than 550 are in the boarding school. The campus occupies over 500 acres (200 ha) of Hertfordshire countryside, approximately 20 mi (32 km) from London.

== Academic ==
Haileybury was judged 'Excellent in all areas' in its 2022 Inspection Report by the Independent Schools Inspectorate (ISI).

In 2022, 90% of A-Level/IB grades were awarded at A*-B, or the equivalent.

In 2023, the school saw 43.9% of its candidates score A*/A.

== Model United Nations ==
Haileybury hosts its own Model United Nations Conference every year, for over a thousand pupils, making it the largest MUN conference in the UK. The conference is typically held the weekend before the Easter holiday.

== History ==
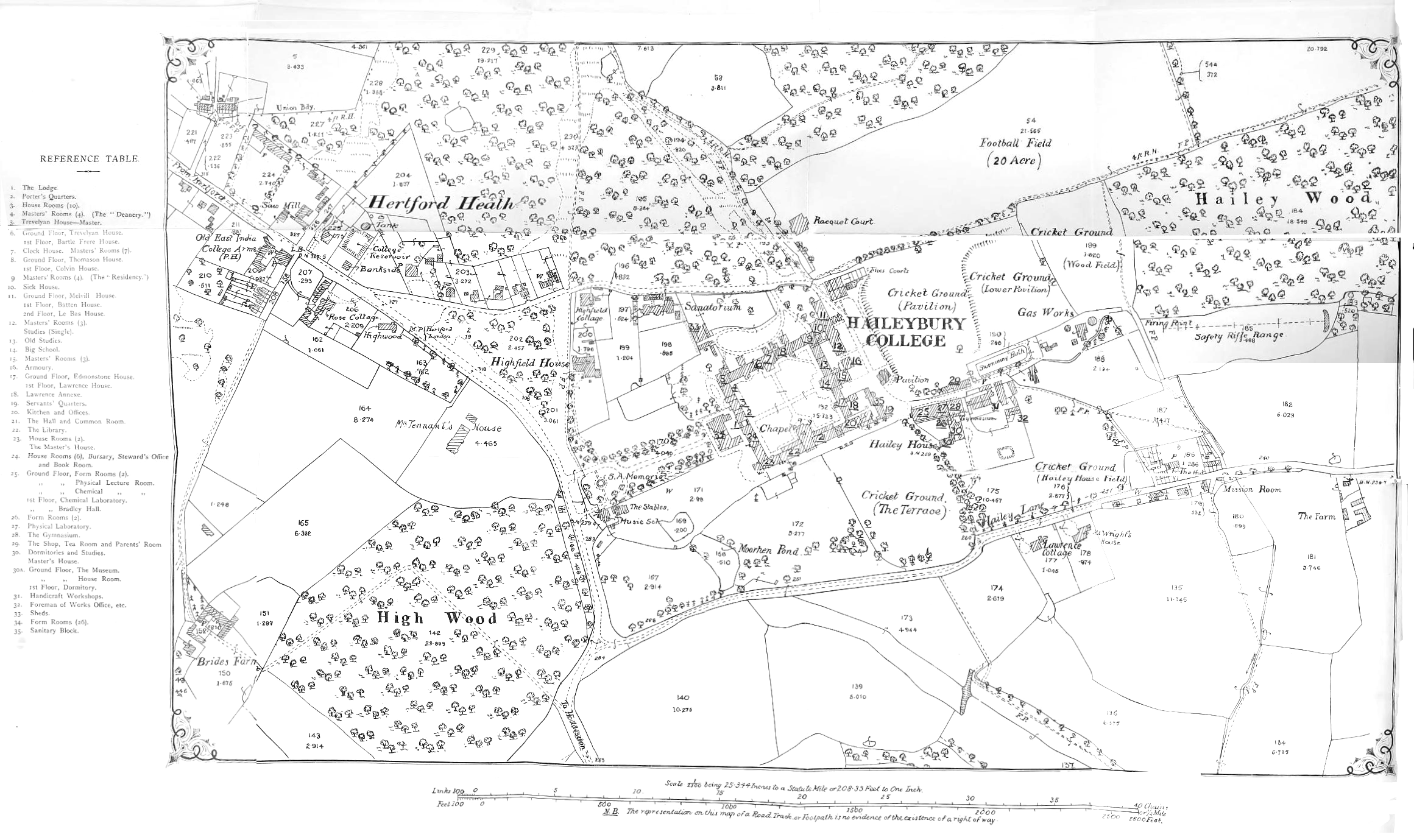
Map of the campus, 1910

The Haileybury campus originally belonged to, and was occupied by, the East India College, the training establishment founded in 1806 for administrators of the East India Company. The East India College was initially based at Hertford Castle, but substantial grounds in Hertford Heath were acquired for future development. William Wilkins, the architect of Downing College, Cambridge, and the National Gallery in London, was appointed principal architect. The buildings comprise four ranges which enclose an area known as Quad, the second-largest academic quadrangle in Britain after that of Christ Church, Oxford.

The East India College closed in 1858 and, four years later, Haileybury College was set up as a boarding school for boys on the site. The first headmaster was Arthur Gray Butler. In 1942, Haileybury and the Imperial Service College (which had itself subsumed the United Services College) merged to become Haileybury and Imperial Service College, now referred to simply as Haileybury.

In the late 20th century, reforming headmaster David Jewell took charge of Haileybury, bringing it out of its post–Cold War austerity. Stuart Westley, Master of Haileybury until July 2009, was responsible for making the school fully co-educational.

== Haileybury Almaty and Haileybury Astana ==
In 2006/2007, Haileybury advised on the building of a Haileybury Almaty in Almaty, Kazakhstan, where all-English GCSEs are taught and the curriculum is taught similarly under the guidance of Haileybury. The school, opened in September 2008, is known as Haileybury Almaty.

The pupils are made up mostly of Kazakh citizens. They are all required to speak English. The academic year 2010–11 saw the first batch of pupils pass their IGCSE exams. Since August 2011, Haileybury Almaty has opened a sixth form. In 2016, 11 pupils graduated from the sixth form, with one getting admission to Trinity College, Cambridge, and 6 securing places at University College, London (UCL). A second school, Haileybury Astana in the Kazakhstan capital, Astana, was opened in September 2011.

== Notable former pupils ==
Past pupils are known as Old Haileyburians.

For a list, see List of people educated at Haileybury and Imperial Service College.
