= Henry Hill (disambiguation) =

Henry Hill (1943–2012) was an American mobster who became an FBI informant.

Henry Hill may also refer to:

== Architects ==
- Henry Hill (Irish architect) (c. 1806–1887), founder of an architectural dynasty in Ireland.
  - Henry Houghton Hill (1882–1951), an Irish architect and grandson of Henry Hill.
- Henry Hill Vale (1831–1875), British architect
- Henry Hill (American architect) (1913–1984), American architect

== Sportspeople ==
- Henry Hill (New Zealand cricketer) (1845–1924), Welsh-born New Zealand cricketer, played for Canterbury 1873–74
- Henry Hill (cricketer, born 1851) (1851–1905), English cricketer
- Henry Hill (Yorkshire cricketer) (1858–1935), English cricketer, played for Yorkshire 1888–91
- Henry Hill (Warwickshire cricketer) (1861–1913), English cricketer, played for Warwickshire 1894–1900
- Henry Hill (Australian cricketer) (Henry John Hill, 1878–1906), Australian cricketer
- Henry Hill (American football) (born c. 1949), American football player

== Other people ==
- Henry Hill (bishop) (1921–2006), Canadian Anglican Bishop of Ontario
- Henry Hill (colonial merchant) (1732–1798), American merchant and politician
- Henry Hill (educationalist) (1849–1933), New Zealand school inspector and educationalist
- Henry Hill (Medal of Honor) (1843–1909), American Civil War soldier and Medal of Honor recipient
- Henry Hill (politician) (1826–1910), freight contractor and politician in South Australia
- Henry Hill (Royal Navy officer) (1775–1849), Vice-Admiral of the Royal Navy
- Henry Aaron Hill (1915–1979), African American chemist
- Henry Barker Hill (1849–1903), American chemist at Harvard University
- Henry Erskine Hill (1864–1939), Anglican priest and authorant and politician
- Henry Root Hill (1876–1918), American brigadier general killed in battle
- Henry W. Hill (1853–1929), American politician (New York)
- Henry Worsley Hill (1799–1868), Royal Navy officer and Governor of the Gold Coast
- John Hill (businessman) (Henry John Hill, 1847–1926), South Australian coach-horse operator

== Other uses ==
- Hank Hill (Henry Rutherford Hill), a fictional character from the animated series King of the Hill
- Henry Hill (New York), a mountain in Albany County, New York

== See also ==
- Harry Hill (disambiguation)
- Henry House Hill, scene of fighting in both the Battle of First Bull Run and the Battle of Second Bull Run
- Henry Staveley-Hill, British lawyer and politician
- Henry St. Hill (1807–1866), member of the New Zealand Legislative Council
- Hill (surname)
