= Harry Hill (disambiguation) =

Harry Hill (born Matthew Keith Hall, 1964) is an English comedian, author and television presenter

Harry Hill may also refer to:

- Harry Hill (sportsman) (1827–1896), English-born American businessman, sportsman and saloonkeeper
- Harry W. Hill (politician) (1886 - 1954), Arizona state senator
- Harry W. Hill (admiral) (1890–1971), American admiral
  - USS Harry W. Hill, American warship named after the admiral
- Tiny Hill (Harry Lawrence Hill, 1906–1971), American bandleader
- Harry Hill (cyclist) (1916–2009), British cyclist
- Harry Hill (TV series), television programme featuring the comedian

== See also ==
- The Harry Hill Movie, British comedy film (2013) featuring the comedian
- Harry Hill's Fruit Corner, British radio show (1993–1997) featuring the comedian
- Harry Hill's Real Life Adventures in TV Land, comic strip in The Dandy featuring a cartoon version of the comedian
- Harry Hill's Shark Infested Custard, British children's television series (2005–2006) featuring the comedian
- Harry Hills (1886–after 1919), English cricketer
- Harold Hill (disambiguation)
- Henry Hill (disambiguation)
- Hill (surname)
