= General Hill =

General Hill may refer to:

== United Kingdom ==
- Augustus Hill (British Army officer) (1853–1921), British Army brigadier general
- Edward Rowley Hill (1795–1878), British Army general
- Giles Hill (fl. 1990s–2020s), British Army lieutenant general
- John Hill (Indian Army officer) (1866–1935), British Indian Army major general
- John Hill (courtier) (died 1735), British Army major general
- John Thomas Hill (1811–1902), British Army general
- Walter Hill (British Army officer) (1877–1942), British Army major general
- Rowland Hill, 1st Viscount Hill (1772–1842), British Army general

== United States ==
- A. P. Hill (1825–1865), Confederate States Army lieutenant general
- Benjamin J. Hill (1825–1880), Confederate States Army brigadier general
- Daniel Harvey Hill (1821–1889), Confederate States Army lieutenant general
- Donn Hill (fl. 1990s–2020s), U.S. Army major general
- Edmund Hill (1896–1973), U.S. Army major general
- Eric T. Hill (fl. 1990s–2020s), U.S. Air Force major general
- Henry Root Hill (1876–1918), U.S. Army brigadier general
- Homer S. Hill (1919–1992), U.S. Marine Corps major general
- James A. Hill (1923–2010), U.S. Air Force four-star general
- James E. Hill (1921–1999), U.S. Air Force four-star general
- James T. Hill (born 1946), U.S. Army four-star general
- John G. Hill Jr. (1926–1999), U.S. Army major general
- Tex Hill (1915–2007), U.S. Army Air Forces brigadier general
- Walter Newell Hill (1881–1955), U.S. Marine Corps brigadier general
- William P. T. Hill (1895–1965), U.S. Marine Corps major general

== Other ==
- Benjamín G. Hill (1874–1920), Mexican Revolutionary general
- Frederic William Hill (1866–1954), Canadian Expeditionary Force brigadier general

== See also ==
- Attorney General Hill (disambiguation)
