= Frank J. Lowry =

Frank Jacob Lowry
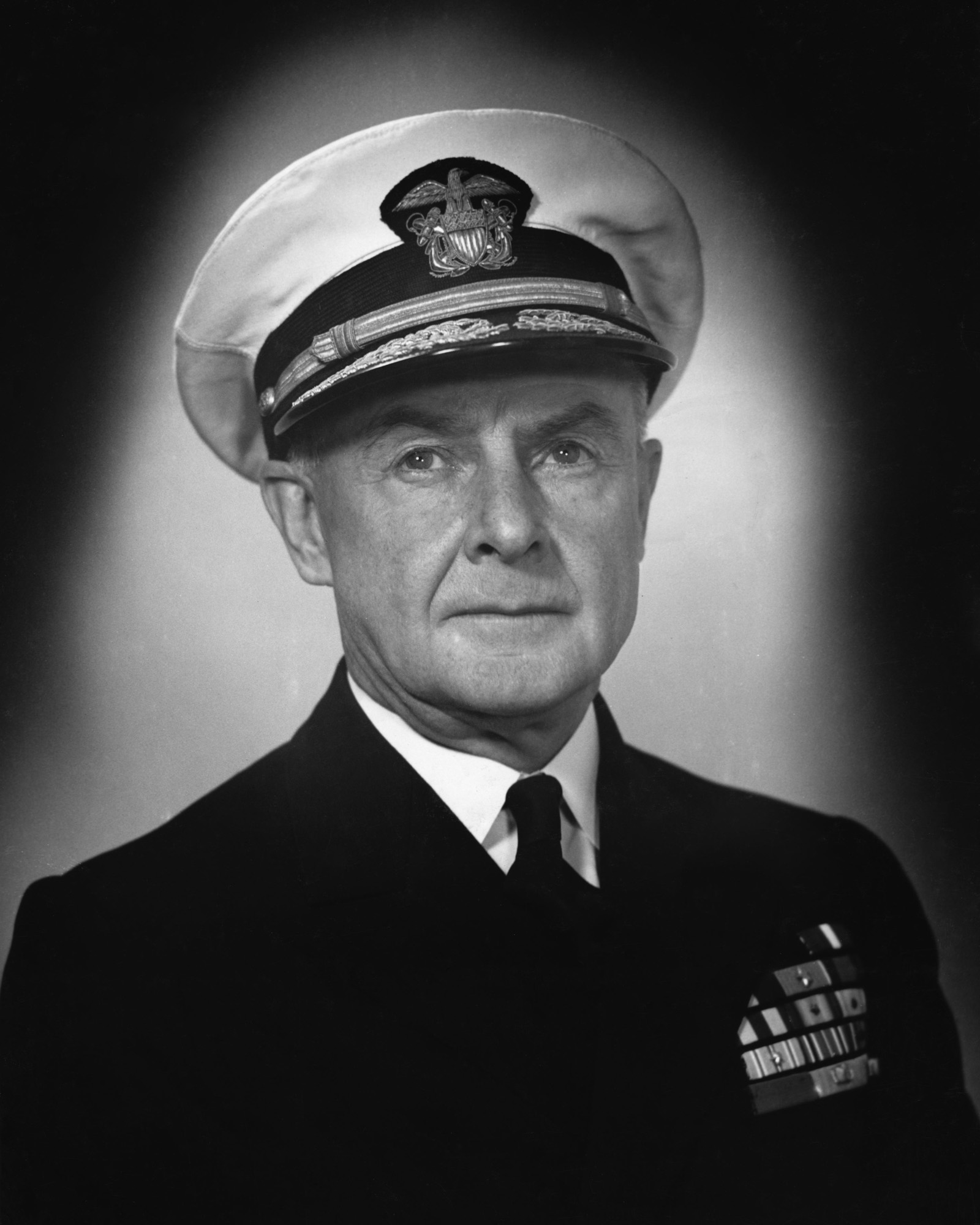
- Rear Admiral Frank J. Lowry
- Born: 15 February 1888; Cresco, Iowa, U.S.
- Died: 26 March 1955 (aged 67)
- Military career
- Allegiance: United States of America
- Branch: United States Navy
- Service years: 1911–1950
- Rank: Vice Admiral
- Commands: VIII Amphibious Force; Moroccan Sea Frontier; USS Minneapolis; USS Hale; USS Pensacola
- Conflicts: World War I World War II: Battle of the Coral Sea; Battle of Midway; Battle of Anzio; Operation Dragoon
- Awards: Navy Cross; Distinguished Service Medal; Legion of Merit (2); Navy Commendation Medal

Vice Admiral Frank Jacob Lowry (15 February 1888 – 26 March 1955) was an officer in the United States Navy who served in World War I and World War II. A 1911 graduate of the United States Naval Academy, he served on submarines during World War I. During World War II, he commanded the cruiser USS Minneapolis at the Battle of the Coral Sea, for which he was awarded the Navy Cross, and the Battle of Midway. He commanded the VIII Amphibious Force in the landings at Anzio and Southern France. He retired from the Navy in March 1950, and received a tombstone promotion to vice admiral due to his combat decorations.

== Early life ==
Frank Jacob Lowry was born in Cresco, Iowa, on 1 February 1888. In 1906, he attended St. John's Military Academy in Delafield, Wisconsin. In 1907, he was appointed to the United States Naval Academy at Annapolis, from which he graduated in 1911. Among his classmates were fellow Admirals Morton Deyo, Harry W. Hill, George D. Murray, Frederick Reifkohl, and John W. Reeves. He was commissioned as an ensign in 1914. He served on submarines, starting with duty on the submarine tender USS Alert in 1914. He became a lieutenant (junior grade) in 1915, and a lieutenant in 1916. In 1917, he was posted to the cruiser USS Raleigh (C-8). The following year he was transferred to the USS Pittsburgh.

After the war, he saw duty at the Mare Island Naval Shipyard. He commanded the cargo ship USS Pensacola from 1922 until 1925, after which he was promoted to lieutenant commander. In 1925, he entered the Naval War College, from which he graduated in May 1926. After service on the battleship USS California from 1926 to 1928, he became a professor of naval science and tactics at the University of California, Berkeley, with the rank of commander.

Following the usual pattern of alternating duty ashore with service at sea, he commanded the destroyer USS Hale from 1931 to 1933, then served as a training officer at Naval Training Center San Diego. He saw sea duty again as executive officer of the cruiser USS Tuscaloosa from 1936 to 1938, after which he was promoted to captain. He was then assigned to the officer personnel division of the Bureau of Navigation in Washington, D.C., from March 1938 to September 1940.

== World War II ==
=== Coral Sea and Midway ===
In October 1942, Lowry assumed command of the cruiser USS Minneapolis. He was its captain during the Battle of the Coral Sea, for which he was awarded the Navy Cross. His citation read:

The President of the United States of America takes pleasure in presenting the Navy Cross to Captain Frank Jacob Lowry, United States Navy, for extraordinary heroism and distinguished service in the line of his profession as Commanding Officer of the Heavy Cruiser U.S.S. Minneapolis (CA-36), during operations in Coral Sea on 7 and 8 May 1942. Under Captain Lowry's skillful direction, his ship during this action inflicted considerable damage on the enemy Japanese and rendered vital protection to the aircraft carrier to which it was assigned. Captain Lowry's inspiring leadership and the valiant devotion to duty of his command contributed in large measure to the outstanding success of these vital missions and reflect great credit upon the United States Naval Service.

As part of Rear Admiral Thomas C. Kinkaid's cruiser group, Lowry's Minneapolis helped protect the aircraft carriers USS Enterprise and USS Hornet at the Battle of Midway in June 1942.

=== Mediterranean Sea ===
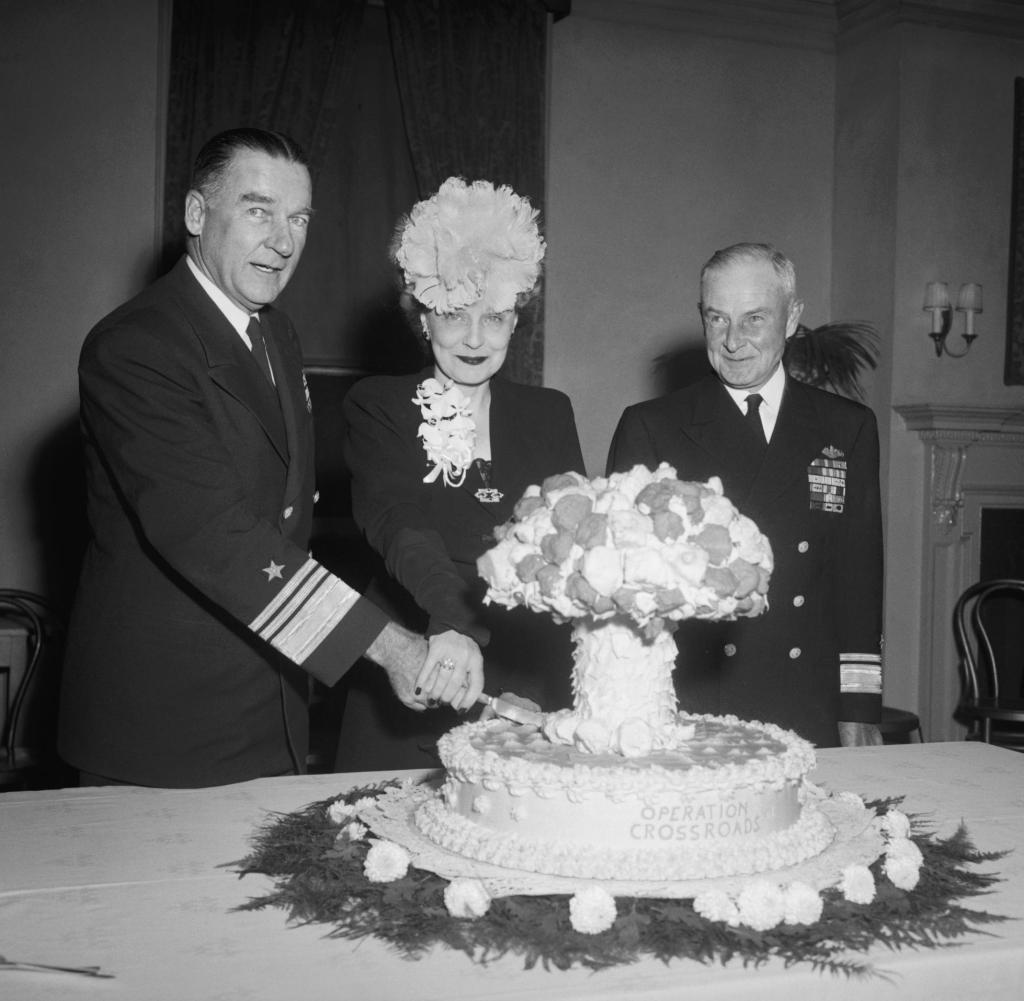
Vice admiral William H. P. Blandy and his wife cut an Operation Crossroads mushroom cloud cake, while Lowry (right) looks on.

Promoted to rear admiral in August 1942, Lowry became executive officer of the Naval Station Great Lakes in November 1942, and subsequently its commander. In February 1943, he became commander of the Moroccan Sea Frontier. He was succeeded Rear Admiral Richard L. Conolly as Commander, Landing Craft and Base, North African Waters (COMLANDCRABNAW) on 16 September 1943. On 8 November, he succeeded Rear Admiral John L. Hall, Jr., as commander of the VIII Amphibious Force. He directed the landing at Anzio in January 1944 from his flagship, the command ship USS Biscayne. The Army commander, Major General John P. Lucas, opined that "the work of the Navy under his [Lowry's] direction has been one of the outstanding achievements of the operation."

For Operation Dragoon, the landings of southern France in August 1944, Lowry commanded Task Force 84, also known as Alpha Force, which transported and Major General John W. O'Daniel's 3rd Infantry Division. This time he flew his flag from the United States Coast Guard cutter USCGC Duane. The operation went smoothly, allowing O'Daniel and his staff to go ashore from Duanne at 10:44, six hours after the first wave. Lowry subsequently commanded an amphibious group with the Pacific Fleet. For his services in World War II, in addition to the Navy Cross, he received the Navy Distinguished Service Medal, twice received Legion of Merit and was awarded the Navy Commendation Medal.

== Later life ==
After the war, Lowry served on the General Board from 1945 to 1947, and then in the office of the Vice Chief of Naval Operations. He served in this capacity until he retired in March 1950, at which point he received a tombstone promotion to vice admiral due to his combat decorations. He died on 26 March 1955.
