= Harold Hill (disambiguation) =

Harold Hill is a suburban area in the London Borough of Havering, East London. Harold Hill may also refer to:

- Harold Hill F.C., English football club based in London's Harold Hill
- Harold Hill (footballer) (1899–1969), English footballer
- Harold N. Hill (1930–2010), justice of the Supreme Court of Georgia
- Harold Hill, fictional character in the 1957 play The Music Man

== See also ==
- Harold Hill Smith (1910–1994), American geneticist
- Harold Hill Goldsmith (fl. 1990s–2020s), American developmental psychologist and behavior geneticist
- Harry Hill (disambiguation)
- Hill (surname)
