= Frederick Louis Riefkohl =

United States Navy admiral and Navy Cross recipient (1889–1969)

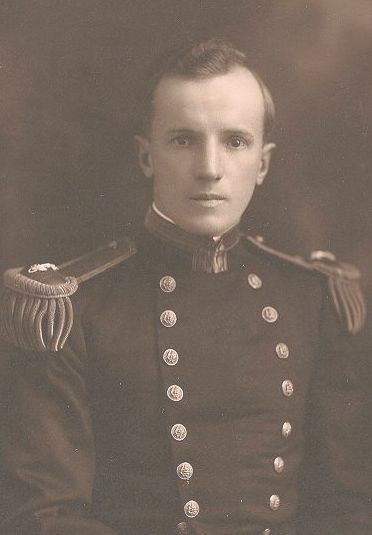
- United States Naval Academy midshipman Frederick Louis Riefkohl; Riefkohl was the first Puerto Rican to graduate from the United States Naval Academy
- Born: February 27, 1889; Maunabo, Puerto Rico
- Died: September 10, 1969 (aged 80); Brevard County, Florida, U.S.
- Burial place: United States Naval Academy Cemetery in Annapolis, Maryland.
- Military career
- Allegiance: United States of America
- Branch: United States Navy
- Service years: 1911-1947
- Rank: Rear Admiral
- Conflicts: World War I World War II
- Awards: Navy Cross; Navy Distinguished Service Medal; Purple Heart

Rear Admiral Frederick Louis Riefkohl(February 27, 1889 – September 10, 1969), a native of Maunabo, Puerto Rico, was an officer in the United States Navy and the first Puerto Rican to graduate from the United States Naval Academy and to be awarded the Navy Cross. The Navy Cross is the second highest medal, after the Medal of Honor, that can be awarded by the U.S. Navy for heroism or distinguished service. He was a World War I Navy Cross recipient who served as Captain of the USS Vincennes during World War II.

== Early years ==
Riefkohl (birth name: Luis Federico Riefkohl Jaimieson), was born and raised in Maunabo, Puerto Rico, his father was Luis A. Riefkohl y Sandoz, a Puerto Rican sugar planter and his mother and Julia Ana Jamieson Mourier, a native of Saint Thomas, Danish West Indies. His paternal grandfather was Otto Riefkohl, a native of Germany and his paternal grandmother was Luisa Sandoz, a native of Switzerland who had immigrated to Puerto Rico in the mid-1800s. His maternal grandfather was David Jamieson a merchant and director of the Bank of St. Thomas and his grandmother was Frederikke Mourier DeWindt a native of St. John. Frederick's older brother was Rudolph W. Riefkohl, who during World War I played an instrumental role in helping the people of Poland overcome the 1919 typhus epidemic. Rudolph eventually became a Colonel in the United States Army Corps of Engineers. His other siblings were his sisters, Helen, Emily and Louise Riefkohl.

Frederick Louis Riefkohl was raised at the Hacienda Orleanaise in Maunabo, his grandparent's sugar plantation, and in the nearby town of Arroyo. His primary education was in the towns of Arroyo, Puerto Rico, Christiansted, St. Croix, Danish West Indies and Concord Massachusetts. Following the death of their mother Frederick and Rudolph were sent by their father to Massachusetts to obtain their secondary education. This was a break in the family tradition of educating the male children in Germany. During the Spanish American War Riefkohl's family, as well as many other wealthy sugar planters, supported the annexation of Puerto Rico by the United States. Likewise, this decision was influenced by the presence of family members who had already established themselves in the Boston area. Frederick attended Phillips Andover Academy for three years, graduating in the class of 1907. Riefkohl received an appointment on July 5, 1907, from Beekman Winthrop, the U.S. appointed Governor of Puerto Rico from 1904 to 1907, to attend the United States Naval Academy in Annapolis, Maryland. In 1911, he became the first Puerto Rican to graduate from the Academy. His Naval Academy classmates included Morton Deyo, Harry W. Hill, Frank J. Lowry, George D. Murray, and John W. Reeves.

During World War I, Lieutenant Riefkohl served as Commander of the Armed Guard of the SS Philadelphia, a civilian passenger liner pressed into service as a troop transport ship. On August 2, 1917, he was awarded the Navy Cross for engaging an enemy submarine. The Navy Cross is the second highest medal that can be awarded by the U.S. Navy and is awarded to members of the U.S. Navy or U.S. Marine Corps for heroism or distinguished service.

== Pre-World War II ==
Riefkohl was reassigned to the Fifteenth Naval District, Balboa, Canal Zone as District Communication Officer. From 1920 to 1923, he served in various ships and in different administrative positions, among which were Squadron Radio Officer for Destroyer Squadron 3, Atlantic Fleet; Aide and Force Radio Officer on the Staff of Commander Destroyer Force, Atlantic Fleet and Executive Officer of the USS Preble en route to the Asiatic Station. From August 1922 until October 1923, Riefkohl served as Aide and Flag Secretary and Fleet Radio and Communication Officer to the Commander in Chief of the Asiatic Fleet.

From July 1926 to August 1928, he assumed the command of the destroyer USS Corry. He returned to the Brooklyn Navy Yard in New York City, after a naval tour which included the ports of Port-au-Prince, Haiti; Guantanamo Bay, Cuba; San Juan, Puerto Rico; and St. Thomas, U.S. Virgin Islands. He served as Executive Officer of the USS Kittery until June 1929. Riefkohl served as Chief of Staff to the governor of the Virgin Islands until April 30, 1931, when he was named Commandant of the islands Naval Station. He continued to serve in various ships until he was placed in charge of the Navy Motion Picture Exchange, Brooklyn Navy Yard, New York, during his senior year at the Naval War College. From January 1935 to December 1936 he served as an adviser to the Argentine Navy Department at Buenos Aires, Argentina. From July 19, 1939 until April 4, 1941, Riefkohl served as War Plans Officer on the staff of the Commandant Fifteenth Naval District, Balboa, Canal Zone.

== World War II ==
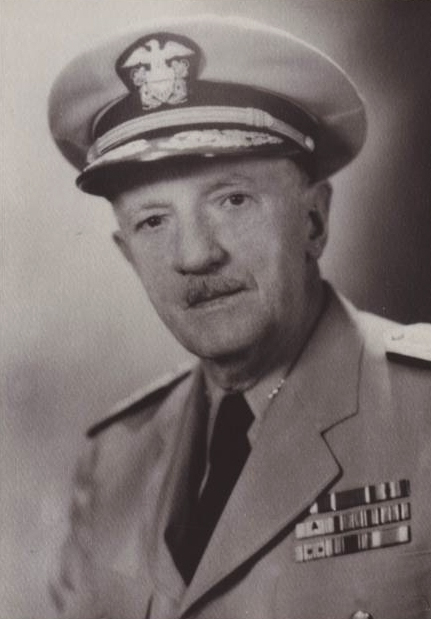
Rear Admiral Frederick L. Riefkohl

Riefkohl assumed command of the USS Vincennes on April 23, 1941. The USS Vincennes was in the Atlantic Ocean when the U.S. entered World War II and escorted the aircraft carrier USS Hornet to the Pacific. The Vincennes was among the cruiser escorts for Hornet and USS Enterprise which were involved with the Doolittle Raids on Tokyo and which later participated in the Battle of Midway.

Riefkohl's ship participated in Guadalcanal operation and was assigned to the Fire Support Group, LOVE (with Transport Group XRAY) under the command of Rear Admiral Richmond K. Turner's Task Force TARE (Amphibious Force). Rear Admiral Turner group was preparing for the Guadalcanal landing which began on August 7, 1942. The USS Vincennes belonged to Task Group 62.2, which screened the landings to the west of the assembled transports unloading on Guadalcanal and Tulagi. Rear Admiral Victor A. Crutchley commanded six allied cruisers, plus a small number of destroyers and minesweepers and split the force into a Northern Force (USS Vincennes, USS Quincy, and USS Astoria) and a Southern Force (HMAS Australia, HMAS Canberra, and USS Chicago)

On August 9, 1942, Rear Admiral Crutchley and his flagship went to meet Rear Admiral Richmond K. Turner, in command of the amphibious force, without notifying Riefkohl.

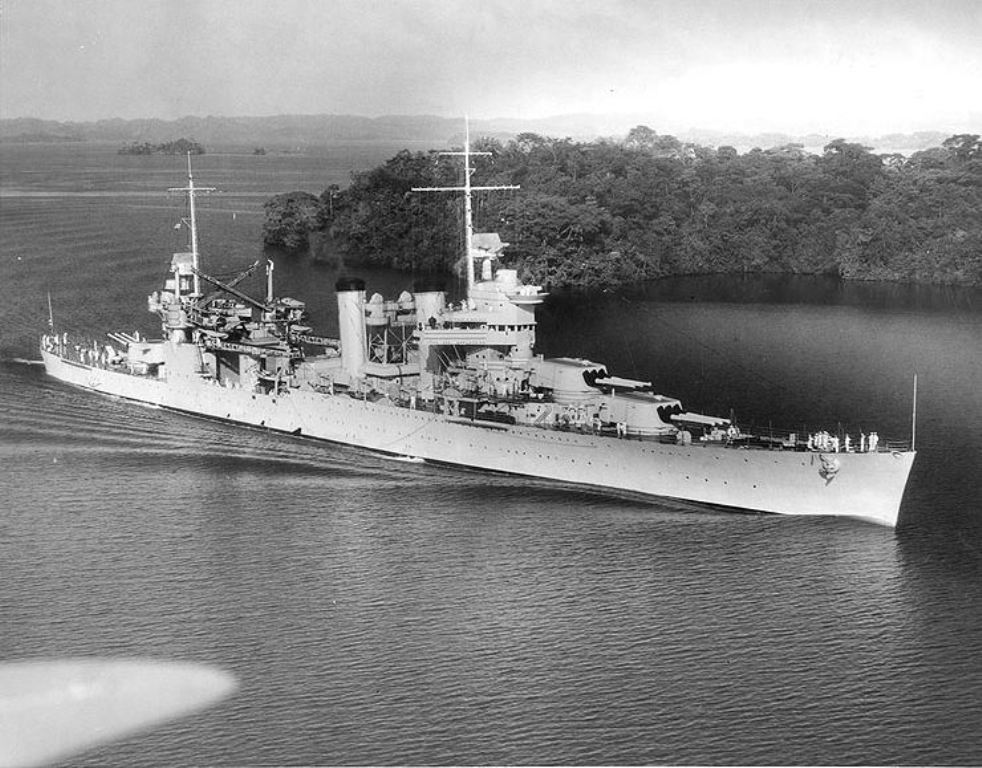
USS Vincennes

The Japanese Admiral Gunichi Mikawa of the Japanese Navy decided to make a surprise attack on the American ships, leading to the Battle of Savo Island. He first destroyed an Australian cruiser, then damaged the USS Chicago before going after the USS Vincennes. Riefkohl was summoned up to the bridge and believed that a minor skirmish was taking place with a ship. When the Japanese ships turned on their searchlights, Riefkohl mistook them for the American ships from the Southern Force and asked them over the radio to turn off their lights because enemy vessels might be near. The Japanese answered the message with a fusillade of shells and torpedoes.

Riefkohl ordered a starboard turn, but the torpedoes hit and exploded, destroying both engine rooms. The USS Vincennes fired back and may have hit the Kinugasa, a Japanese cruiser. The Vincennes received 85 direct hits and Riefkohl ordered his men to abandon the ship. The sailors manned the life rafts and the Vincennes rolled over and sank with 342 men still aboard. Riefkohl was presented a Purple Heart for the wounds which he received.

Rear Admiral Riefkohl wrote in an epitaph: "The magnificent Vincennes, which we were all so proud of, and which I had the honor to command since April 23, 1941, rolled over and then sank at about 0250, August 9, 1942, about 2½ miles east of Savo Island ... Solomons Group, in some 500 fathoms of water."

HMAS Canberra, USS Vincennes, USS Quincy, and USS Astoria sank and the USS Chicago was badly damaged in the battle. However, despite their losses they had successfully screened the amphibious ships that were still unloading to the east. Admiral Mikawa made the decision to evacuate his forces rather than press on to attack the landing ships. He was unaware of the early retreat of US aircraft carriers and was concerned about his ships' ability to withstand air attacks the following day.

In the aftermath of the worst naval defeat in the history of the United States, the Navy censored the news of the Battle of Savo Island. Mikawa's force had achieved complete surprise. Captain Riefkohl testified repeatedly about his actions on August 8–9 and was never formally disciplined. The Hepburn investigation issued a broad indictment of naval preparedness for night actions by the Japanese, in particular making assumptions about what the Japanese were likely to do rather than what they were capable of doing. A breakdown in communications and early awareness of the Japanese battle group's presence was cited as a notable factor in the defeat. This included overconfidence in inadequate radar systems and a lack of effective air reconnaissance.The Navy investigation led to reforms in the area of outfitting ships with less flammable materials and separating the tactical command of a battle group from the command of the individual ships. Although Savo Island was not a decisive battle, the defeat ultimately hardened the US Navy as a fighting force. The Battle of Guadalcanal continued for six more months before the Americans prevailed.

== Later years ==
Captain Riefkohl never commanded a United States Naval vessel again. In October 1942, he reported to the Office of the US Attache, American Embassy, Mexico City in Mexico, and joined the staff of the Commander, Mexican Forces, Region Gulf of Mexico, at Vera Cruz, as Liaison Officer for the US Commander, Gulf Sea Frontier. Throughout the remaining war years, Riefkohl served in different administrative positions, among them District Intelligence Officer, Eighth Naval District, with headquarters at New Orleans, Louisiana.

Captain Frederick Louis Riefkohl later served as the Chief of Staff to the governor of the U.S. Virgin Islands, advisor to the Argentine Navy and as Inspector of the 10th Naval District in San Juan, Puerto Rico. On the basis of his combat citations Riefkohl was advanced to the rank of Rear Admiral upon his retirement from the Navy on January 1, 1947. Rear Admiral Frederick Louis Riefkohl died in Brevard County, Florida in 1969, and was buried with full military honors in the United States Naval Academy Cemetery. He was married to Louisa Gibson Riefkohl (1902–1974) and did not have any offspring.

In 2019 Frederick Louis Riefkohl was posthumously inducted to the Puerto Rico Veterans Hall of Fame.

== Navy Cross citation ==
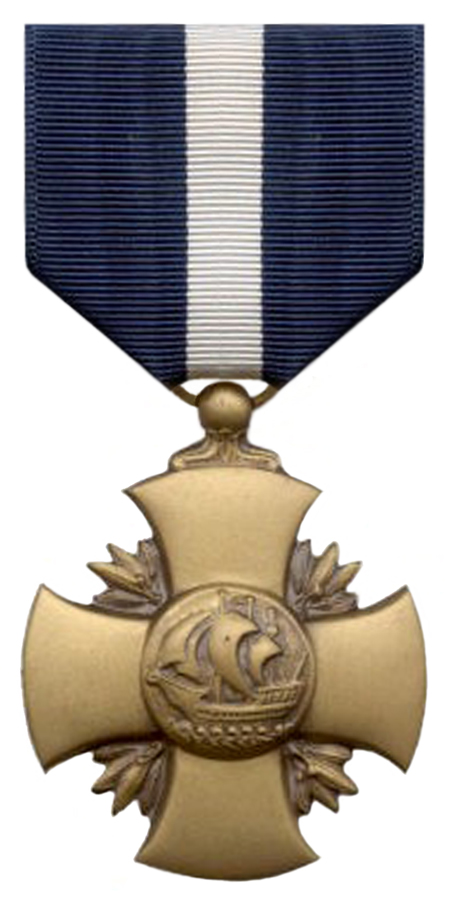

Riefkohl, Frederick L.
Lieutenant, U.S. Navy
Armed Guard, U.S.S. Philadelphia
Date of Action: August 2, 1917
Citation:

The Navy Cross is awarded to Lieutenant Frederick L. Riefkohl, U.S. Navy, for distinguished service in the line of his profession as Commander of the Armed Guard of the U.S.S. Philadelphia (sic), and in an engagement with an enemy submarine. On August 2, 1917, a periscope was sighted, and then a torpedo passed under the stern of the ship. A shot was fired, which struck close to the submarine, which then disappeared.

The Navy Cross citation mistakenly refers to the USS Philadelphia, a C-4, rather than the SS Philadelphia a civilian passenger liner pressed into service as a troop transport.

== Awards and recognitions ==
Among Rear Admiral Frederick Lois Riefkohl's decorations and medals were the following:

| 1st Row | Navy Cross | | Navy Distinguished Service Medal |
| 2nd Row | Purple Heart | Mexican Campaign Medal | World War I Victory Medal with Armed Guard Clasp |
| 3rd Row | American Defense Service Medal with bronze "A" Device | American Campaign Medal | European-African-Middle Eastern Campaign Medal |
| 4th Row | Asiatic-Pacific Campaign Medal with two bronze Service stars | World War II Victory Medal | Mexican Medal of Naval Merit |

== See also ==
- Hispanic Admirals in the United States Navy
- List of Puerto Ricans
- Puerto Ricans in World War I
- Puerto Ricans in World War II
- List of Puerto Rican military personnel
- German immigration to Puerto Rico
- Puerto Rican recipients of the Navy Cross
- Hispanics in the United States Navy
- Hispanics in the United States Naval Academy
