= USS Vincennes (CA-44) =

New Orleans class heavy cruiser

Coordinates: 9°7′17″S 159°52′48″E

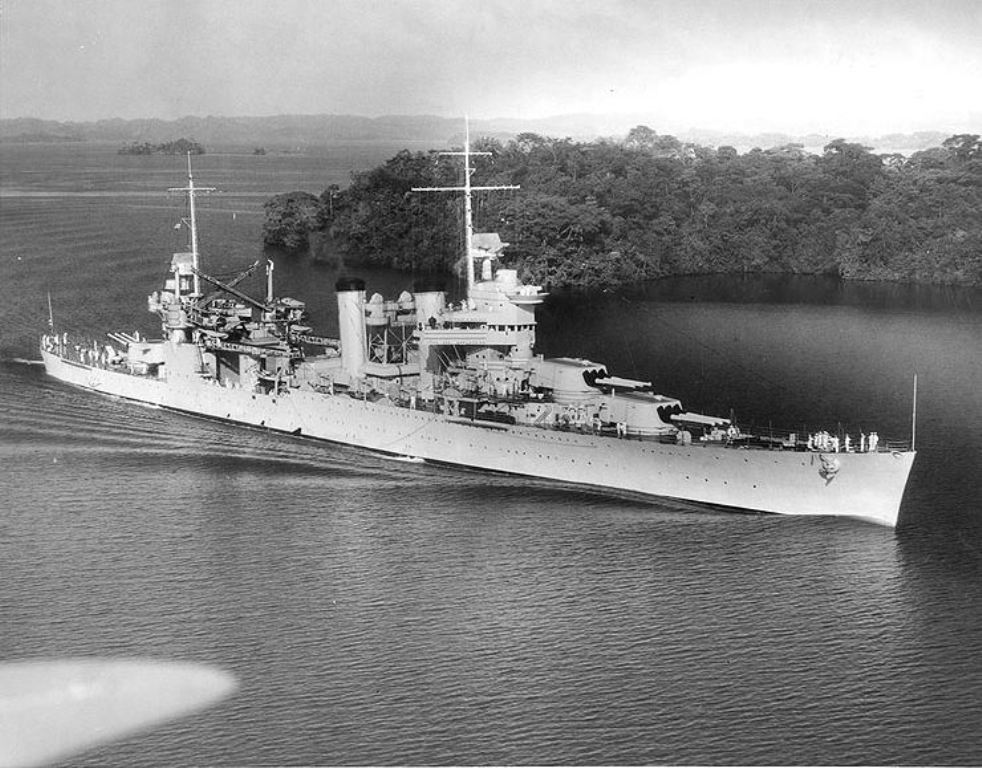
- USS Vincennes, passing through the Panama Canal on 6 January 1938, while en route to join the U.S. Fleet in the Pacific

History

United States
- Name: Vincennes
- Namesake: City of Vincennes, Indiana
- Ordered: 16 June 1933
- Awarded: 3 August 1933
- Builder: Bethlehem Shipbuilding Corporation's Fore River Shipyard, Quincy, Massachusetts
- Cost: $11,720,000 (contract price)
- Laid down: 2 January 1934
- Launched: 21 May 1936
- Sponsored by: Miss Harriet Virginia Kimmell
- Commissioned: 24 February 1937
- Identification: Hull symbol: CA-44
- Honors and awards: 2 × battle stars
- Fate: Sunk, Battle of Savo Island, 9 August 1942

General characteristics (as built)
- Class & type: New Orleans-class cruiser
- Displacement: 9,400 long tons (9,551 t) (standard); 12,463 long tons (12,663 t) (loaded)
- Length: 588 ft (179 m) oa; 575 ft (175 m) pp
- Beam: 61 ft 10 in (18.85 m)
- Draft: 18 ft 8 in (5.69 m) (mean); 23 ft 6 in (7.16 m) (max)
- Installed power: 8 × Babcock & Wilcox boilers; 107,000 shp (80,000 kW)
- Propulsion: 4 × steam turbines; 4 × screws
- Speed: 32.7 kn (60.6 km/h; 37.6 mph)
- Range: 10,000 nmi (19,000 km; 12,000 mi) at 15 knots (28 km/h; 17 mph)
- Capacity: Fuel oil: 1,650 tons
- Complement: 103 officers 763 enlisted
- Armament: 9 × 8 in (203 mm)/55 caliber guns (3x3); 8 × 5 in (127 mm)/25 caliber AA guns; 2 × 3-pounder 47 mm (1.9 in) saluting guns; 8 × 0.50 in (12.7 mm) machine guns
- Armor: Belt: 3–5 in (76–127 mm); Deck: 1 1/4–2 1/4 in (32–57 mm); Barbettes: 5 in (130 mm); Turrets: 1 1/2–8 in (38–203 mm); Conning Tower: 5 in (130 mm)
- Aircraft carried: 4 × floatplanes
- Aviation facilities: 2 × Amidship catapults

General characteristics (1942)
- Armament: 9 × 8 in (203 mm)/55 caliber guns (3x3); 8 × 5 in (127 mm)/25 caliber anti-aircraft guns; 2 × 3-pounder 47 mm (1.9 in) saluting guns; 12 × single 20 mm (0.79 in) Oerlikon anti-aircraft cannons; 4 × quad 1.1 in (28 mm)/75 caliber anti-aircraft guns

USS Vincennes (CL/CA-44) was a United States Navy New Orleans-class cruiser, sunk at the Battle of Savo Island in 1942. She was the second ship to bear the name.

She was laid down on 2 January 1934 at Quincy, Massachusetts, by the Bethlehem Shipbuilding Company's Fore River plant, launched on 21 May 1936, sponsored by Miss Harriet Virginia Kimmell (daughter of Joseph Kimmell, mayor of Vincennes, Indiana), and commissioned on 24 February 1937, Captain Burton H. Green in command.

The New Orleans-class cruisers were the last U.S. cruisers built to the specifications and standards of the Washington Naval Treaty of 1922. Such ships, with a limit of 10,000 tons standard displacement and 8-inch caliber main guns may be referred to as "treaty cruisers." Originally classified a light cruiser when she was authorized, because of her thin armor, Vincennes was reclassified a heavy cruiser, because of her 8-inch guns. The term "heavy cruiser" was not defined until the London Naval Treaty in 1930. This ship and Quincy were a slightly improved version of the New Orleans-class design.

== Inter-war period ==
The new cruiser departed from Boston on 19 April 1937 for her shakedown cruise which took her to Stockholm, Sweden; Helsinki, Finland; Le Havre, France; and Portsmouth, England.

Early in January 1938, Vincennes was assigned to Cruiser Division 7 (CruDiv 7), Scouting Force, and steamed through the Panama Canal to San Diego, California. In March, the ship participated in Fleet Problem XIX in the Hawaiian area before returning to San Pedro, California, for operations off the west coast for the remainder of the year.

Following an overhaul at the Mare Island Navy Yard which lasted through April 1939, the cruiser returned east, transited the Panama Canal on 6 June, in company with Quincy, Tuscaloosa, and San Francisco and anchored in Hampton Roads on the 13th. For the next two months, she operated out of Norfolk in the vicinity of the Chesapeake lightship and the southern drill grounds. On 1 September 1939, the day on which Adolf Hitler's legions marched into Poland and commenced hostilities in Europe, Vincennes lay at anchor off Tompkinsville, New York. She then began conducting Neutrality Patrols off the east coast, ranging into the Caribbean Sea and the Yucatán Channel, and continued these duties through the spring of 1940.

Late in May, as German troops were smashing Allied defenses in France, Vincennes received orders to immediately transit to the Azores and then, receive further direction. However, the cryptologic code machine failed once Vincennes arrived at Ponta Delgada. Unable to receive follow-on orders, the Vincennes remained in port from 4–6 June 1940 until the code machine was repaired by an enlisted sailor, Lewis Lee Edwards, using an emory board file to remove corrosion from the code machine's electrical contacts. For his actions, Edwards was offered a naval officer's commission.

With her communications reestablished, the Vincennes received urgent orders to proceed to French Morocco to receive a shipment of gold from the French Currency Gold Reserves for transport to the United States preventing it from being captured by Nazi Germany a few days later. While at anchor at Casablanca, the ship received word of Italy's declaration of war upon France, the "stab in the back" condemned by President Franklin Roosevelt soon thereafter. Vincennes' commanding officer — Captain John R. Beardall (later to become Naval Aide to the President) — noted subsequently in his official report of the cruise that "it was apparent that the French bitterly resented this [the declaration of war] and despised Italy for her actions." After departing North African waters on 10 June, the cruiser returned to the United States to offload her precious metallic cargo and return to the drudgery of Neutrality Patrols.

Overhauling at Norfolk Navy Yard, Portsmouth, Virginia, into the first week of January 1941, Vincennes departed Hampton Roads on 7 January, in company with Wichita, New York, and Texas, bound for Guantánamo Bay, Cuba. Operating once again in the Caribbean, the heavy cruiser fired battle practice and gunnery exercises in company with Wichita through 18 January, when the two cruisers proceeded for Portland Bight, Jamaica. Conducting Neutrality Patrols from this port, Vincennes patrolled in company with other ships safeguarding neutral waters and America's recently acquired Caribbean bases.

Vincennes joined other Fleet units for landing exercises at Culebra, Puerto Rico, on 4 February 1941 and sent her 50 ft (15 m) boats to assist in unloading and troop debarkation drills. She assisted transports McCawley and Wharton in landing men and material before taking station with Fire Support Group II. The cruiser then fired simulated gunfire support operations with her main and secondary batteries in exercises which foreshadowed her future combat role in the South Pacific.

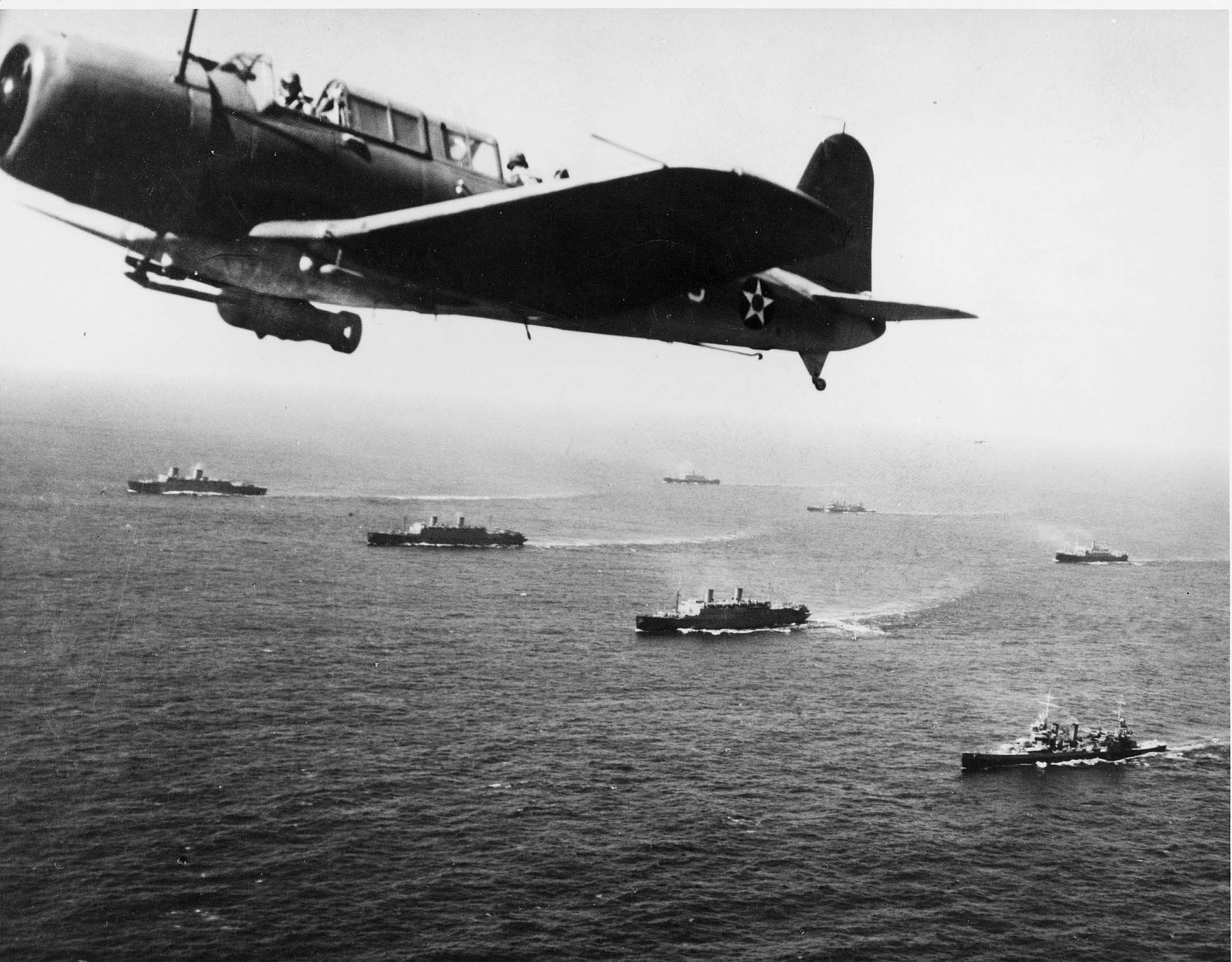
Vought SB2U Vindicator covering Convoy WS-12 en route to Cape Town.

For the remainder of February, the ship continued her landing support operations with Transport Divisions 2 and 7 (TransDivs 2 and 7), anchoring on occasion at Mayagüez or Guayanilla, Puerto Rico. Conducting operations out of Puerto Rican waters, Vincennes called at Pernambuco, Brazil, on 17 March and got underway for Cape Town, South Africa, on the 20th. Arriving to a warm welcome nine days later, the ship took on a large shipment of gold bullion to pay for arms purchased in the United States by the United Kingdom and then headed home on the 30th. En route to New York, she conducted exercises. After a brief post-voyage period of repairs, the heavy cruiser sailed for the Virginia Capes, where she rendezvoused with Ranger and Sampson, proceeded on to Bermuda, and dropped anchor in Grassy Bay on 30 April. She patrolled in the Caribbean and off the Atlantic coast of the United States through June.

After continuing her duties with the Neutrality Patrol into the autumn as American naval forces in the North Atlantic found themselves engaged in a de facto war with Germany, Vincennes undertook another mission to South African waters. She left the east coast late in November with Convoy WS-12, American transports carrying British troops. On 7 December 1941, the cruiser fought its way through heavy seas. Walls of water mercilessly pounded the ships of the convoy, and waves battered Vincennes, smashing a motor whaleboat to pieces and ripping a SOC Seagull floatplane from its "moorings" on the storm-lashed well-deck amidships. The plane was battered against the catapult silos and into the hangar doors before it was swept over the ship's side. By that evening, however, the ship learned that she was not only at war with the elements but with Japan as well. Japanese naval air forces had struck Pearl Harbor and plunged the United States into war.

== World War II ==
After having safely convoyed her charges to Cape Town, where she arrived on 9 December, Vincennes departed South African waters on the 16th, bound, via Trinidad, for Hampton Roads. Following her arrival at Norfolk on 4 January 1942, she shifted to New York four days later to be outfitted for war. Late in the month, she joined Hornet as the carrier conducted her shakedown training off the east coast of the United States.

Vincennes sailed from New York on 4 March, bound for the Pacific. She transited the Panama Canal on 11 March, and proceeded to San Francisco.

=== Doolittle Raid ===
The heavy cruiser, now a part of TF 18, built around Hornet, departed San Francisco on 2 April. The carrier bore a strange deck cargo: 16 Army North American B-25 Mitchell medium bombers slated to strike at Japan's heart. TF 18 rendezvoused with TF 16, built around Enterprise, and with the combined might of the two task forces, struck out westward across the Pacific, headed toward Japanese home waters.

On the morning of 18 April, when the American warships were still some 150 mi (240 km) from the planned launch point, an unexpected hitch developed. Japanese trawlers sighted and reported the task force. Vice Admiral William Halsey decided to fly off the bombers immediately. Accordingly, all 16 of the heavily loaded Mitchells, laden with bombs and extra fuel, rose from Hornet's spray-slicked flight deck and climbed unsteadily into the leaden gray skies. Although the raid inflicted only minimal materiel damage upon the Japanese homeland, it nevertheless packed a powerful morale building "punch". When queried as to the base from whence the bombers had come, President Roosevelt said "from Shangri-La".

The combined Enterprise and Hornet task force retired eastward and made Pearl Harbor on 25 April. Departing again five days later, the ships, still screened by Vincennes, bent on speed toward the Coral Sea. However, they were too late to take part in the Battle of the Coral Sea.

=== Battle of Midway ===
Vincennes' task force returned to Pearl Harbor on 26 May but got underway again on the 29th, bound for waters off Midway Island, which, according to American intelligence reports, a Japanese invasion force was approaching. By 4 June, the heavy cruiser had joined TF16 and was steaming north of Midway.

After American air attacks had crippled three of the four Japanese carriers the Vincennes, together with the cruiser Pensacola and destroyers Benham and Balch, was sent over to TF17 to reinforce the carrier Yorktown after it had suffered damage in a dive bombing attack.

At 1640, a group of Nakajima B5N "Kate" torpedo bombers from Hiryū approached from the north. TF 17's radar soon picked them up 15 mi (24 km) out, and Yorktown launched planes to intercept as her screen deployed to bring an optimum concentration of anti-aircraft fire to bear upon the approaching enemy. Three minutes after the first plane was spotted, Grumman F4F Wildcats from the carrier hit a "Kate". The Japanese torpedo plane spiraled from the sky trailing a long streamer of smoke before crashing into the sea.

Vincennes opened fire at 1644 with her 5 in (130 mm)/25 cal, 20 mm, and 1.1 in (28 mm) anti-aircraft batteries. Increasing her speed to 25 kn (29 mph; 46 km/h) and slowly turning to starboard, Vincennes kept her port guns trained on the enemy. While combing torpedo tracks, Vincennes hit a "Kate" and it went into the sea 150 yd (140 m) off her port bow.

The sharp, bitter action ended as quickly as it had begun. The Japanese had been driven off, but at a high cost for the Americans. Yorktown, mortally hit and listing to port, slowed to a halt. Vincennes followed Astoria around the carrier, screening from further air attacks. However, on 6 June, I-168 slipped through a screen of six destroyers and torpedoed Yorktown and Hammann, sinking the latter. The carrier went down early on the 7th.

Following the battle of Midway USS Vincennes received the rescued Ensign George Gay who had just been picked up by a PBY Catalina Flight boat, Ensign Gay was the sole survivor of 30 VT-8 aircrew from the carrier Hornet that participated in the Battle of Midway.

Returning to Pearl Harbor, Vincennes entered the navy yard for repairs and alterations which lasted until early July. She then conducted tactical exercises off the island of Hawaii with other ships of TF 11 before departing Hawaiian waters on 14 July to rendezvous with TFs 16, 18, and 62.

=== Guadalcanal Campaign ===
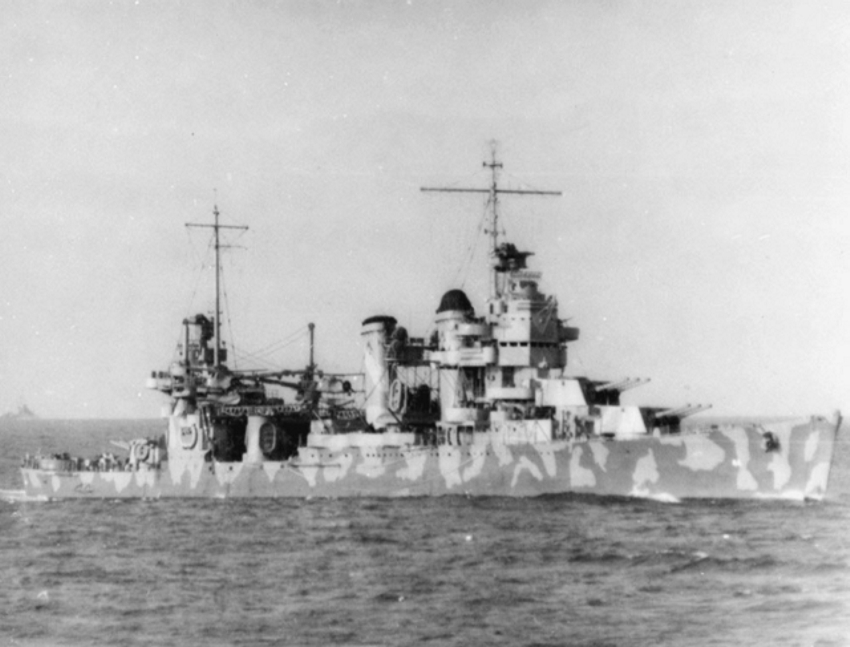
USS Vincennes en route to Guadalcanal.

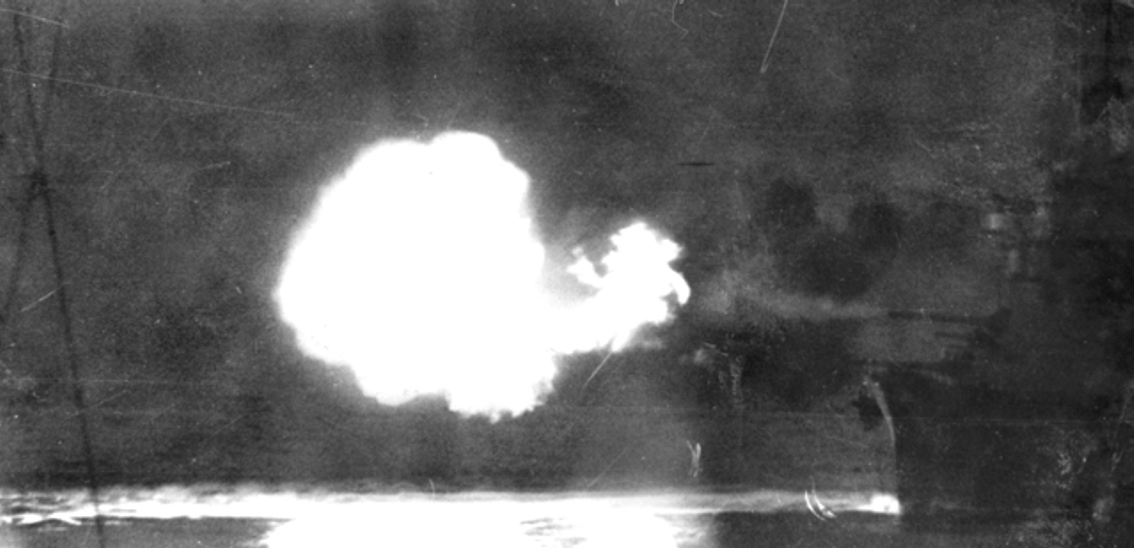
Vincennes bombarding Guadalcanal on the morning of 7 August 1942.

Screening for transport squadron "X-ray", slated to participate in the Guadalcanal landings, Vincennes, in company with San Juan and Quincy, joined TF 62 on 26 July. On the 27th, the cruiser conducted approach exercises for landing practice and simulated bombardment drills off Koro Island in the Fiji group. As flagship for Task Group 62.3 (TG 62.3), Vincennes remained on station in the covering force in the transport area before undertaking further approach and landing exercise support drills.

Following replenishing, the heavy cruiser formed up with the American armada making its way to the Solomon Islands. Vincennes, screening transport division "Yoke", arrived off Guadalcanal on 7 August. At daybreak, beneath overcast skies, the ship catapulted her scout planes and then unlimbered her main and secondary batteries to commence shore bombardment. While the thunder of the supporting ships' gunfire reverberated across the waters, Marines disembarked from their landing craft and stormed ashore to meet initially light resistance on the island.

Shortly after 1320, Japanese planes launched a counterstrike. To sunward of the transports, Vincennes found herself in a favorable position to combat the attack and tracked the opposing planes, being among the first ships to open fire on the attackers. Forced to jettison their deadly loads prematurely, the Japanese retired without doing any damage, but not before Vincennes had bagged two of them. After sunset, Vincennes, Quincy, and Astoria, in company with Helm and Jarvis, retired to conduct screening patrols.

Returning to her covering duties at daylight, Vincennes arrived at transport area "X-ray", off Guadalcanal by daybreak. Two minutes before noon, Japanese bombers, intent on avenging their losses of the day before and disrupting the American landing, swooped down from Rabaul. 27 Mitsubishi G4M "Betty" bombers swept in, in a low-level torpedo attack and ran a gauntlet of gunfire from the transports and their escorting cruisers and destroyers. 3,000 yd (2,700 m) from the transports, Vincennes, as in the previous day's action, was again in favorable firing position and opened up with every gun in her battery, from 8 in (200 mm) to 20 mm, that could bear on the attackers.

During the ensuing melee, the cruiser used her 8 in (200 mm) guns effectively, helping to down at least seven "Bettys" which flew at an altitude of only 25 to 50 ft (7.6 to 15.2 m). The shell splashes from the main battery caused Japanese pilots to fly into walls of water or forced them to drastically alter their approaches. Vincennes dodged one torpedo which passed beneath her stern and evaded a bomb which fell off her port quarter. Jarvis, adjacent to the cruiser, took one torpedo hit which ultimately proved fatal to the ship.

Later, during the afternoon, aerial reconnaissance reported a Japanese surface force coming down from the base at Rabaul. These flights noted what was thought to be three Japanese cruisers, three destroyers and two gunboats or seaplane tenders steaming south. While Jarvis limped away from Lunga Point, Vincennes and her sisters Quincy and Astoria steamed, as the northern escort force, to a position off Savo Island to screen the vulnerable transports which were still unloading off the invasion beaches. Captain Frederick Lois Riefkohl of Vincennes assumed that the enemy ships reportedly en route from Rabaul were going to launch and support another air attack early the following morning. He accordingly issued orders to be especially vigilant during the midwatch and fully expected an air attack at daybreak.

=== Loss at the Battle of Savo Island ===
At about midnight on 8 August, Riefkohl retired to his sea cabin, adjacent to the pilothouse, after having been on the bridge continuously since 0445 that morning. Turning in at 0050 on 9 August, he left his ship in the hands of the executive officer, Commander W. E. A. Mullan.

Nearly an hour later, at about 0145, lookouts spotted flares and star shells to the southward, accompanied by the low rumble of gunfire. The sound of the general quarters alarm soon rang throughout the ship and stirred her to action. Vincennes' lookouts were seeing the elimination of the southern escort group, based around HMAS Canberra and Chicago. Unbeknownst to the men manning the ships to the northward, a powerful enemy force was heading in their direction. Six cruisers and one destroyer under the command of Vice Admiral Gunichi Mikawa had turned north and were steaming directly towards Vincennes and her two sisters.

The first Japanese cruiser searchlight beams illuminated Vincennes shortly after 0155, and the American cruiser opened fire with her main battery at the troublesome lights. Within a minute, however, Japanese shells bracketed the ship and Vincennes shuddered under the impact of Japanese eight-inch armor-piercing shells. The bridge, carpenter shop, "battle II," and radio antenna trunks all were hit by the first salvo.

Altering course to port, Riefkohl, who had come to the bridge at the alarm, rang down for increased speed. With the ship and internal communications disrupted, it is doubtful that the order was received. Still moving at 19.5 kn (22.4 mph; 36.1 km/h), the heavy cruiser reeled under the impact of another group of direct hits.

Some of the shells in this group set fire to the volatile aircraft in Vincennes' hangar space, and the resultant flames became uncontrollable. A direct hit knocked the aft antiaircraft director overboard. At 0200, Vincennes heeled to starboard in an attempt to evade enemy gunfire, only to be hit by Japanese torpedoes. One or two "Long Lance" torpedoes ripped into the ship's number 4 fireroom and put it out of action. In moments the report came "Both engine rooms are black and dead."

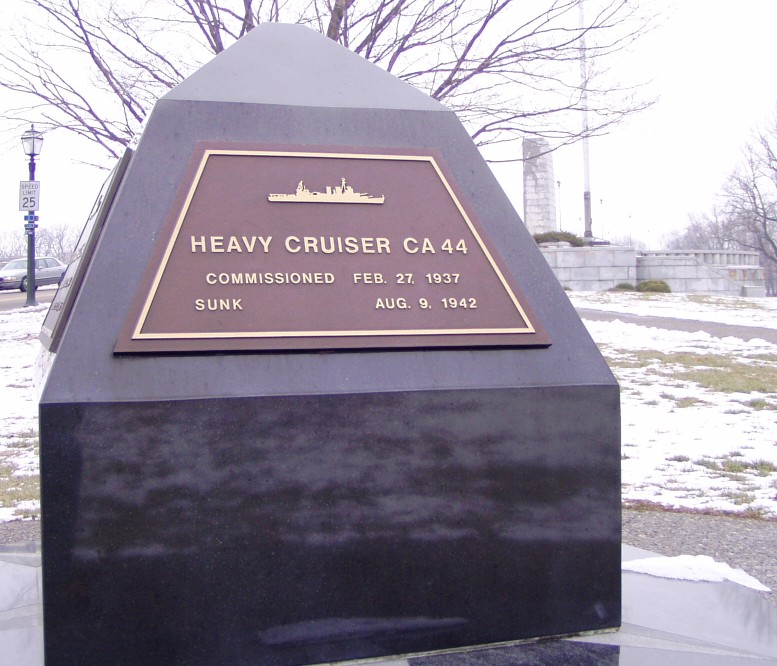
Memorial to USS Vincennes in Vincennes, Indiana

Having lost power and all steering control five minutes later, Vincennes was dead in the water within minutes. The glare of burning fires attracted additional incoming shells which quickly put the ship's own guns out of action. Vincennes shuddered to a halt. Hit at least 85 times by 8 and 5 in (200 and 130 mm) shells, the ship gradually began to list.

At 0210, the Japanese retired, leaving Savo Island and the burning hulks of three American cruisers in their wakes. As Vincennes' list increased to port, Riefkohl issued the order to abandon ship at 0230. Serviceable life jackets and rafts were broken out, and the crew began abandoning ship. At 0240, the captain went down to the main deck and jumped into the waters of what would come to be known as Ironbottom Sound. 322 crewmen were killed in action.

Riefkohl subsequently wrote: "The magnificent Vincennes, which we were all so proud of, and which I had the honor to command since 23 April 1941, rolled over and then sank at about 0250, 9 August 1942, about 2½ miles east of Savo Island ... Solomons Group, in some 500 fathoms [910 m] of water."

== Rediscovery ==
The wreck of USS Vincennes was discovered in early 2015 during a sonar mapping project of Iron Bottom Sound led by Microsoft co-founder Paul Allen.

== Awards ==
- Vincennes earned two battle stars for her World War II service.

== See also ==
- List of U.S. Navy losses in World War II

== Bibliography ==
- Dorris, Donald Hugh (1947). A log of the Vincennes. Standard Print. Co.
- Fahey, James C. (1941). The Ships and Aircraft of the U.S. Fleet, Two-Ocean Fleet Edition. Ships and Aircraft.
- Hennessy, M. Shawn (2009). Freedom's Fortress: Vincennes' History of Service to the United States. Seattle: MS Hennessy Publishing. ISBN 978-0-615-29191-8.
- Newcomb, Richard F. (2002). The Battle of Savo Island: The Harrowing Account of the Disastrous Night Battle Off Guadalcanal that Nearly Destroyed the Pacific Fleet in August 1942. Holt Paperbacks.
- Ruiz, Kenneth C. (2005). The Luck Of The Draw. MBI Publishing Company.
- Warner, Denis Ashton; Warner, Peggy; Senoo, Sadao (1992). Disaster in the Pacific. Holt Paperbacks.
- Roll of Honor
- Account of the gold transfer is in December 1985 issue of USNI Proceedings
