= Floyd Lavinius Parks =

United States Army general (1896–1959)

Floyd L. Parks
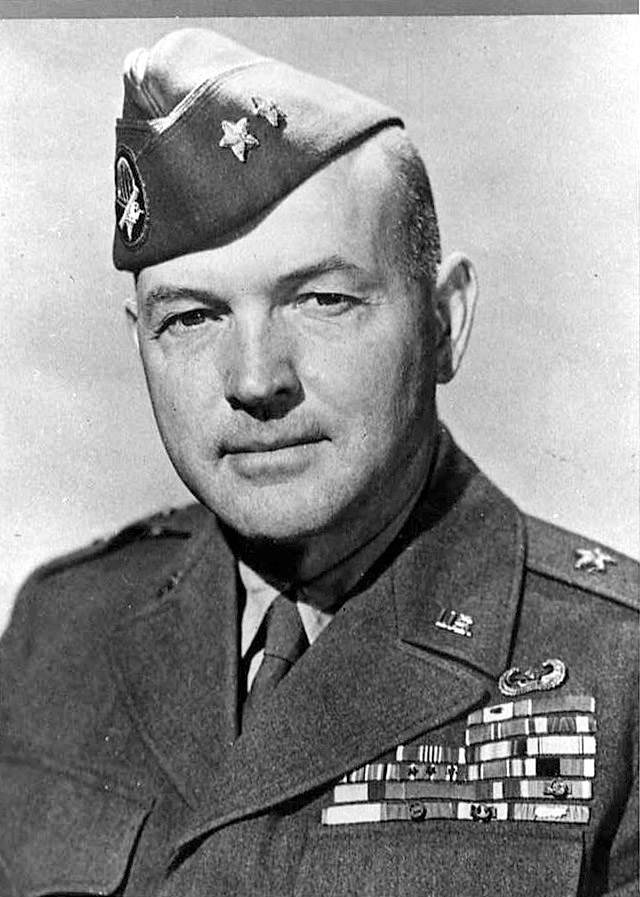
- Born: 9 February 1896; Louisville, Kentucky, U.S.
- Died: 10 March 1959 (aged 63); Washington, D.C., U.S.
- Burial place: Arlington National Cemetery
- Military career
- Branch: United States Army
- Service years: 1918–1956
- Rank: Lieutenant General
- Service number: 0-10582
- Commands: First Allied Airborne Army; US Sector and Military Governor, Berlin, Germany; Second Army
- Conflicts: World War I; World War II; Operation Market Garden; Operation Varsity
- Awards: Army Distinguished Service Medal (2); Legion of Merit; Bronze Star; Air Medal; Army Commendation Medal; Order of Kutuzov First Class (USSR); Order of the Bath (UK)

Floyd Lavinius Parks (9 February 1896 – 10 March 1959) was a United States Army officer who served with distinction during World War II. During the war, he was chief of staff of the US Army Ground Forces and the First Allied Airborne Army. As such, he participated in Operation Market Garden that directed air drops into the Netherlands behind the German lines which were preventing Allied forces from crossing the Rhine river. He commanded the US First Airborne Army in 1945 on his promotion to major general. After the war, Parks commanded the US Sector in Berlin before going to Washington, D.C., to become the chief of the Public Information Division for the Army. Later, he commanded American forces in the United States Army Pacific in 1949. After service in Hawaii, he became chief of the Information Department, whereafter he was known as the "father of modern Army public affairs." He received a promotion to lieutenant general in 1953 and thereafter served as commanding general of the Second Army until his retirement in 1956.

== Early life ==
Parks was born in Louisville, Kentucky, on 9 February 1896, the youngest of four children of Lyman Lewis Parks and Lizzie Pratt née Manly. He attended the Clemson College and graduated with a Bachelor of Science degree in mechanical and electrical engineering in 1918.

== World War I ==
Parks entered the army as a private in 1918 and was commissioned into infantry that year. He served as a machine gun instructor with the 65th Engineers, the US Army's first Tank Corps unit, under the command of Captain Dwight D. Eisenhower from 1918 to 1923 at Camp Colt, Pennsylvania. There, he also served as a commanding officer of Company A, 333rd Tank Battalion, and the Tank Corps Reserve Officers Training Camp.

== Between the wars ==
Parks was aide de camp to Major General Edward McGlachlin, Jr. from 1921 to 1923. He received a Master of Science in engineering from Yale University and graduated from Tank School in 1924. Also in that year he married Molly Mitchel Trewbridge, but the marriage lasted only 3 years and they were divorced in 1927. In 1927, he became the commanding officer of Company A, 21st Infantry at Schofield Barracks in Hawaii. From 1928 to 1932 he was at West Point as the aide-de-camp to Major General William R. Smith, the superintendent of the United States Military Academy. In 1931 he married Harriet Marie Appleby-Robinson with whom he raised four children. Parks graduated from United States Army Infantry School in 1933. He then attended the Command and General Staff School in Fort Leavenworth, Kansas, graduating in June 1935. He then served as an instructor until 1937. From 1937 to 1939, he was aide-de-camp to General Malin Craig, Chief of Staff of the Army.

== World War II ==
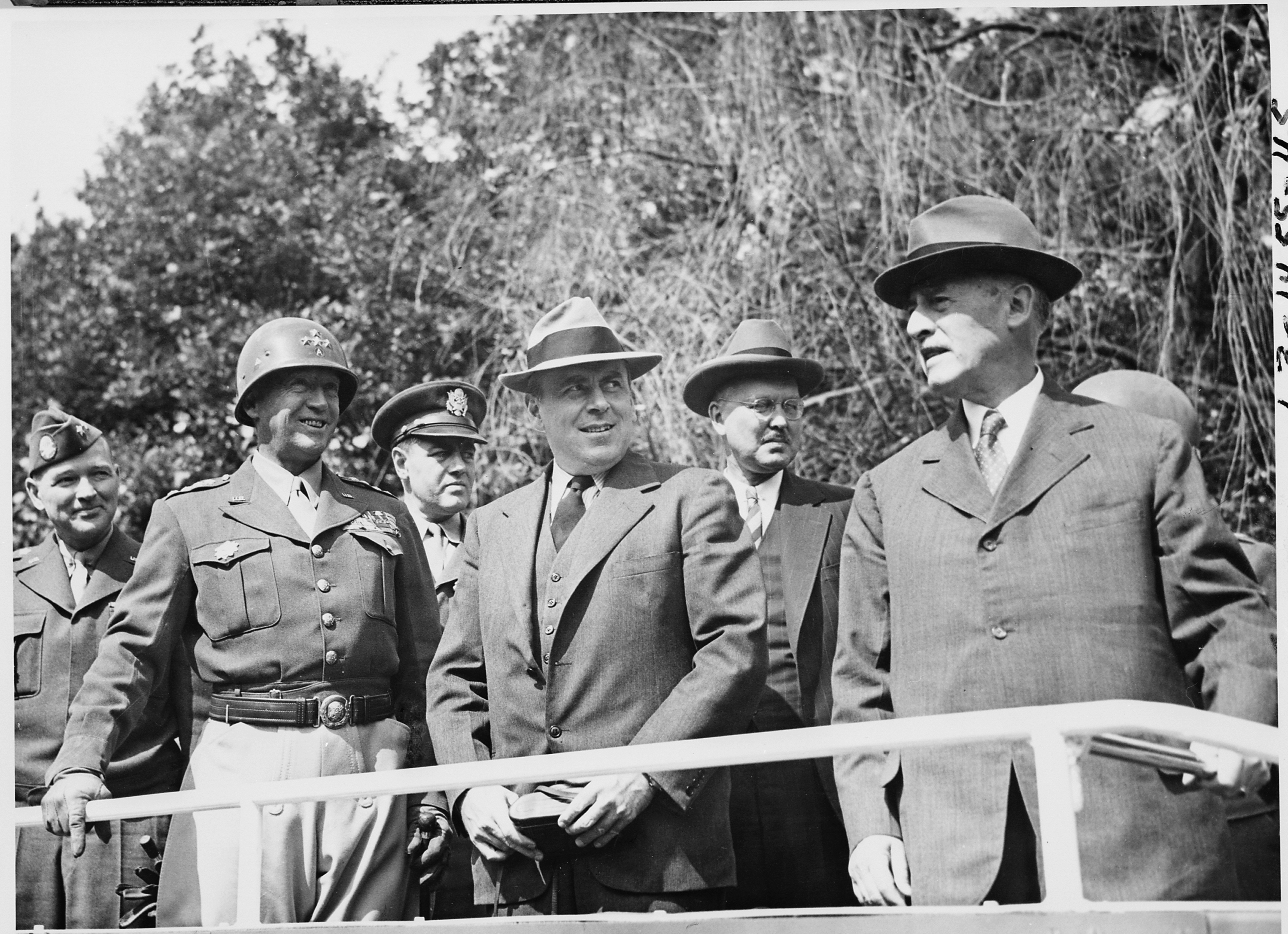
From left to right: Major General Floyd L. Parks, U. S. Commanding General, Berlin area; Gen. George S. Patton, Commanding General, U. S. 3rd Army; Col. W. H. Kyle, aide to Secretary of War Stimson; J. J. McCloy, Assistant Secretary of War; H. H. Bundy; and Secretary of War Henry L. Stimson. They are reviewing the 2nd Armored Division in Berlin, Germany during the Potsdam Conference.

Parks graduated from the Army War College in 1940 and became plans and training officer of the 2nd Armored Brigade and then he served on the staff of the 2nd Armored Division. In July 1941 he became secretary of the War Department General staff. In March 1942, he was appointed Deputy Chief of Staff of the Army Ground Forces under Lieutenant General Lesley J. McNair, later becoming its chief of staff. He was promoted to brigadier general in June 1942. From May 1943 to July 1944 he was the Assistant Division Commander of the 69th Infantry Division at Camp Shelby, Mississippi, under the command of Major General Charles L. Bolte. In August 1944 he became Chief of Staff of the First Allied Airborne Army, later the U.S. First Airborne Army, under Lieutenant General Lewis H. Brereton. He was promoted to major general in March 1945. From May to October 1945, he succeeded Brereton in command of the First Airborne Army.

== Post World War II and the Cold War ==
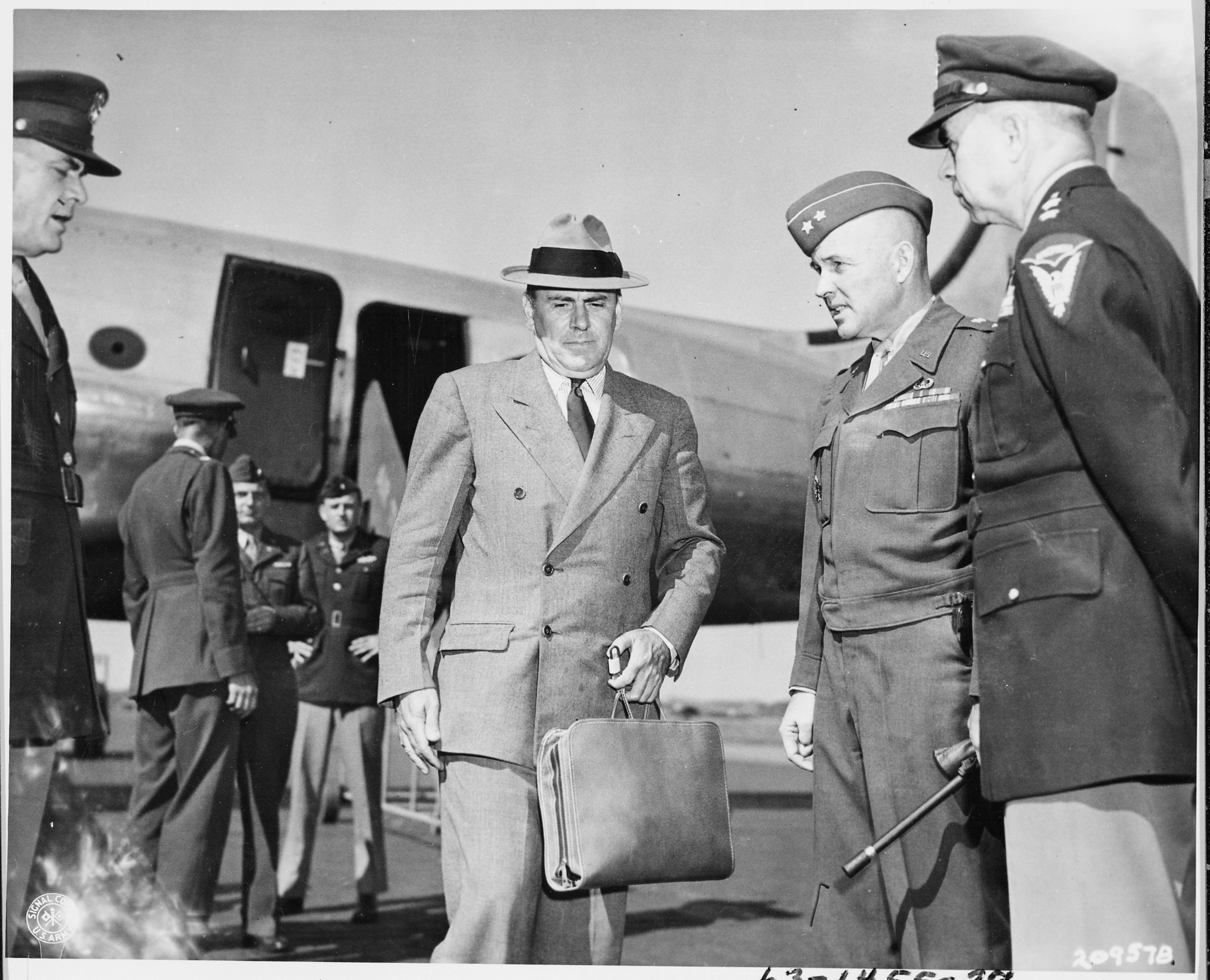
John J. McCloy, Assistant Secretary of War, arrived at Gatow Airport in Berlin, Germany to attend the Potsdam Conference. At right are Major General Floyd L. Parks, and Major General Edmund W. Hill.

From July to September 1945, Parks commanded the US Sector and was military governor in Berlin. He represented the United States in the Kommandatura which permitted the four Allied powers to govern the city. This effectively made him the mayor of the US sector in Berlin. In October 1945, Parks went to Washington, D.C., to become the chief of the Public Information Division for the Army. He held this post from 1945 until 1948. In this position he released to the press that General of the Army Dwight D. Eisenhower was not planning to run as a candidate for either party, Democratic or Republican, in the 1948 elections. From 1948 to 1949 he was the Deputy Commanding General of the United States Army Pacific in Hawaii. While performing duties as such he was flying over the Solomon Islands and witnessed the eruption of the Mt Bagana volcano on Bougainville Island. His photographs of this eruption were published in Life magazine. The following year he won the All Army Golf Championship, Senior Division, held in San Antonio, Texas, on 13 August 1949. After his service in Hawaii, he became chief of the Information Department, a position he held until 1953. He received a promotion to lieutenant general that year and served as Commanding General for the Second United States Army at Fort Meade, Maryland, until his retirement in 1956.

== Later life ==
Parks became the executive director of the National Rifle Association in March 1956, a position he held until his death. He continued golfing and won the Mid-Atlantic Senior Golf Championship in Virginia Beach, Virginia, in 1957. Parks often went golfing with President Eisenhower, and at one time, Parks scored a hole in one while playing with him. Parks died on 10 March 1959, after a long illness at Walter Reed Army Hospital in Washington, D.C. He was buried at Arlington National Cemetery.

== Decorations ==
Parks' awards included: the Distinguished Service Medal (twice), the Legion of Merit, the Bronze Star, the Air Medal, and the Army Commendation Medal. He also received awards from foreign countries including the British Order of the Bath, and the Soviet Order of Kutuzov First Class.

- Distinguished Service Medal
- Legion of Merit
- Bronze Star
- Air Medal
- Army Commendation Medal
- World War I Victory Medal
- American Defense Service Medal
- American Campaign Medal
- European-African-Middle Eastern Campaign Medal
- World War II Victory Medal
- Army of Occupation Medal
- Order of Kutuzov First Class
- Grand Officerof the Order of Orange-Nassau with Swords (15 January 1946)

== Honors and Legacies ==
A golf course at Fort Meade was named in his honor. Berlin has a street named after him, Floyd-L-Parks-Weg, located in the Lichterfelde West area. Parks was elected to the U.S. Army Public Affairs Hall of Fame, Class of 2000 with the recognition as "the father of modern Army public affairs." His papers are in the Eisenhower Presidential Center.

== Notes ==
Military offices
Preceded by Edward H. Brooks	Commander, Second United States Army; 1953–1956	Succeeded by Charles E. Hart
