= George D. Murray =

United States Navy admiral

George Dominic Murray
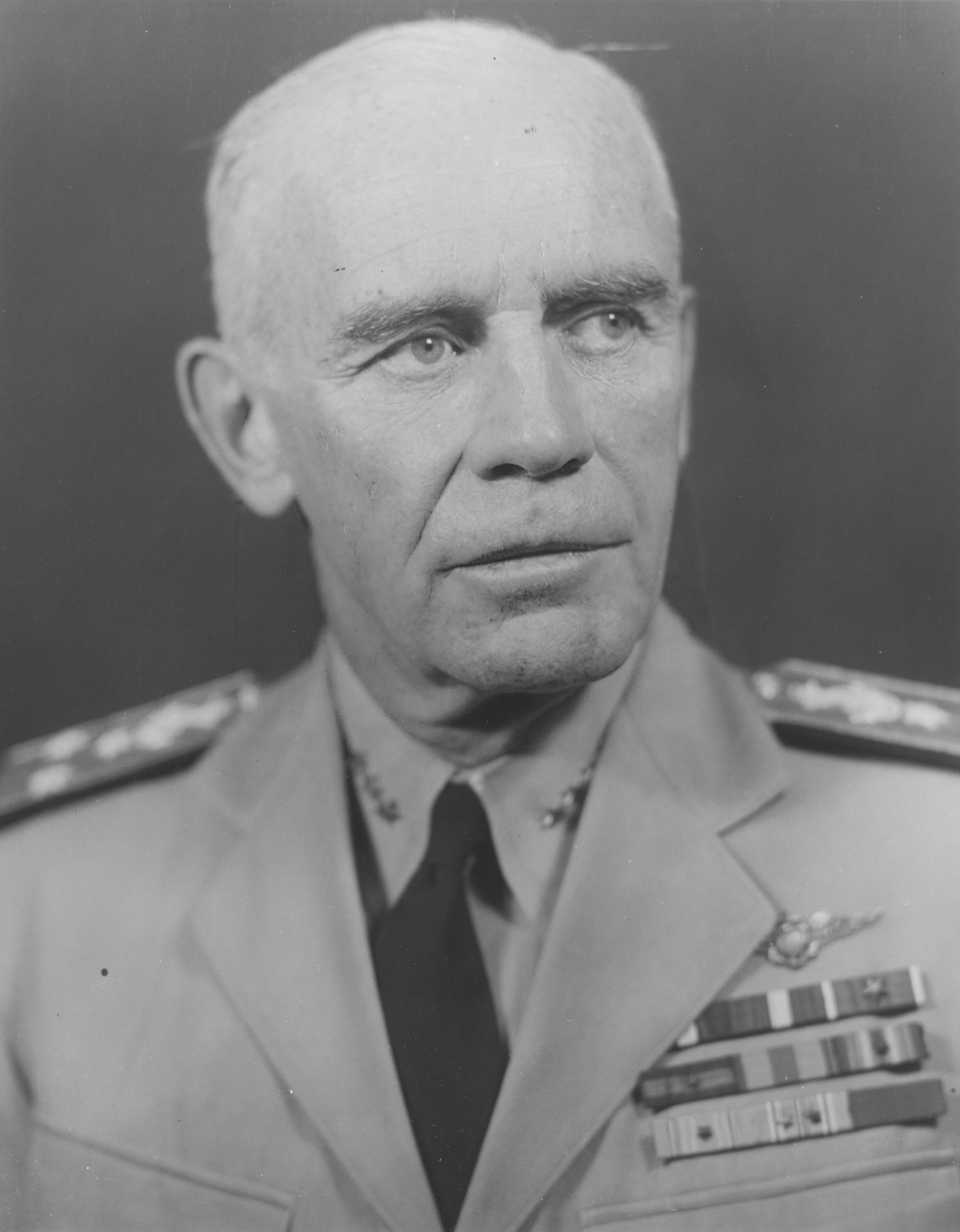
- Born: July 6, 1889; South Boston, Massachusetts, U.S.
- Died: 18 June 1956 (aged 66); San Francisco, California, U.S.
- Burial place: Arlington National Cemetery
- Military career
- Allegiance: United States
- Branch: United States Navy
- Service years: 1910–1951
- Rank: Admiral
- Commands: First Fleet; Naval Air Force, Pacific; USS Enterprise; VT-20
- Conflicts: World War I World War II
- Awards: Navy Cross; Navy Distinguished Service Medal; Legion of Merit (2)

George Dominic Murray (July 6, 1889 – June 18, 1956) was an admiral in the United States Navy and an early naval aviator.

== Biography ==
Murray was born in Boston, Massachusetts, attended the U.S. Naval Academy, graduating in 1911, his classmates included Morton Deyo, Harry W. Hill, Frank J. Lowry, John W. Reeves, and Frederick Riefkohl. He became Naval Aviator number 22 in 1915.

At the beginning of 1924, he was the commander of Torpedo and Bombing Squadron 20 (VT-20). In January, his squadron of seaplanes was transferred from San Diego to the Philippines aboard Vega (AK-17) to provide air support for the Asiatic Fleet.

During World War II, Murray commanded the aircraft carrier Enterprise (CV-6), from 21 March 1941 to 30 June 1942, which included the Doolittle Raid on Tokyo and the Battle of Midway.

From 17 August 1944 to 20 July 1945, he commanded U.S. Naval Air Forces, Pacific Fleet.

At the end of the war, Murray was the commander of the Mariana Islands, and accepted the Japanese surrender of the Caroline Islands aboard his flagship, the cruiser Portland (CA-33).

He commanded the First Fleet from August 1947 to August 1948.

He retired as a full admiral in 1951, died in San Francisco, California, on 18 June 1956, and was buried in Arlington National Cemetery.

In 1961, Murray was posthumously designated the third recipient of the Gray Eagle Award, as the most senior active naval aviator from 1947 until his retirement.

== Personal life ==
Murray is the stepfather of Vice Admiral Lloyd M. Mustin, the step-grandfather of Vice Admiral Henry C. Mustin, and the step great grandfather of Vice Admiral John B. Mustin.
