= Edmund Hill =

United States Army general

Major General Edmund W. Hill
- Born: April 26, 1896; New London, Connecticut, USA
- Died: May 1, 1973 (aged 77)
- Education: Massachusetts Institute of Technology
- Occupation: Aviator
- Organizations: United States Army; United States Army Air Service; United States Army Air Forces
- Awards: Army Distinguished Service Medal; Legion of Merit with oak leaf cluster; Bronze Star; Air Medal; Commander of the Order of the British Empire; Legion d'honeur; Croix de Guerre with Palm

Major General Edmund W. Hill CBE (April 26, 1896 – May 1, 1973) was an American aviation pioneer who served in the military in both world wars.

== Military career ==
Born in New London, Connecticut, Hill attended Massachusetts Institute of Technology, then was commissioned as a second lieutenant in the United States Army's infantry on August 9, 1917, and promoted to first lieutenant on the same day. After serving in France during World War I, he was transferred to the Air Service on February 25, 1922.

Hill was a free and captive balloon pilot, flew dirigible airships and was an airplane pilot. In 1924, he was the pilot of the first airship to launch and pick up an airplane while in flight, at Wilbur Wright Field. His 1928 balloon licence (number 25; FAI number 930) was one of very few signed by Orville Wright, in his capacity as Chairman of the National Aeronautic Association's Contest Committee.

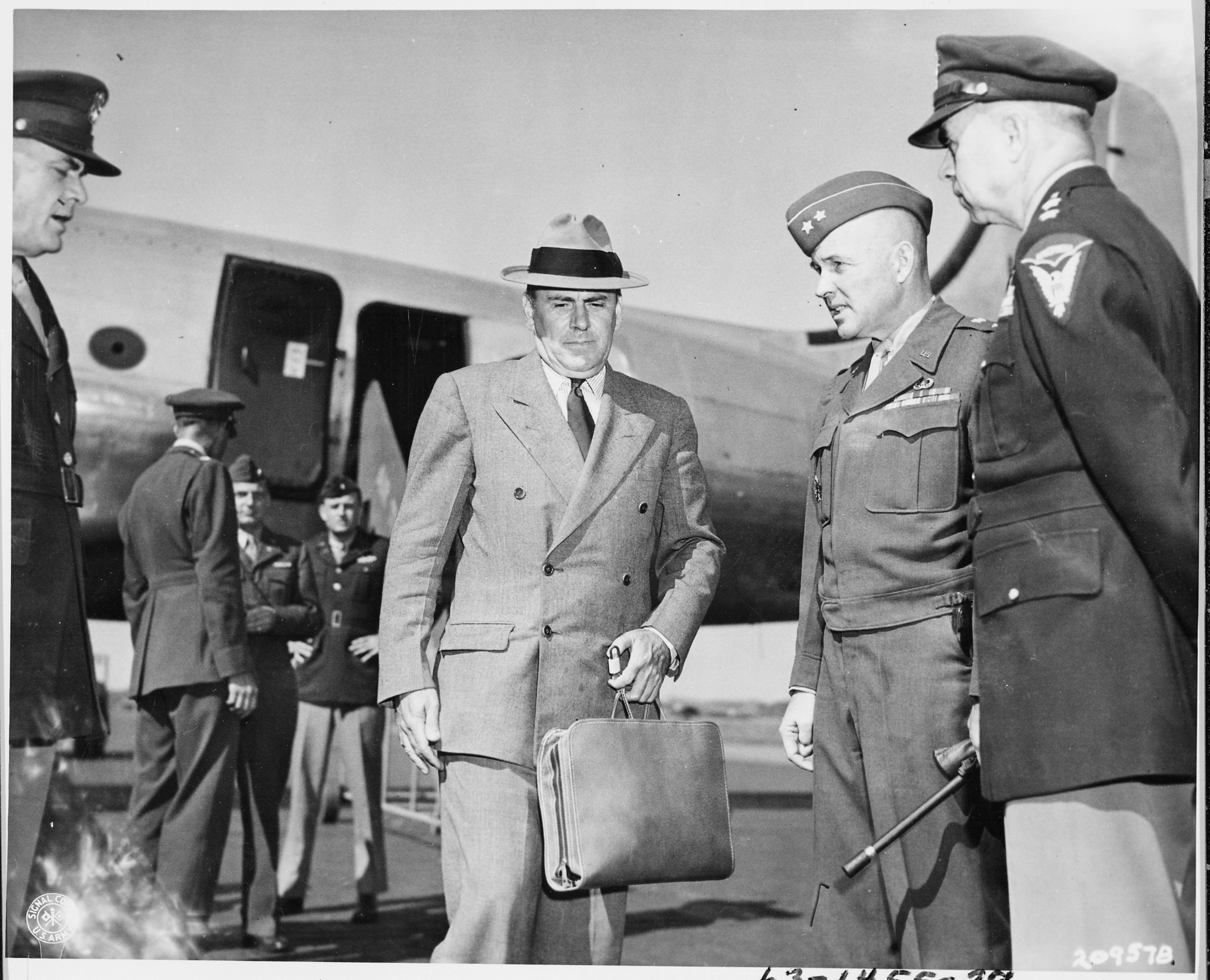
John J. McCloy, Assistant Secretary of War, arrived at Gatow Airport in Berlin, Germany to attend the Potsdam Conference. At right are Major General Floyd L. Parks, and Major General Edmund W. Hill.

Hill attended the United States Army War College from September 1938 until June 1939.

Hill was commander of Bolling Field in Washington DC from 1939-1941, then of U.S. Air Forces in Northern Ireland, and the Eighth Air Force Composite Command during World War II. He was in charge of air operations at the Yalta and Potsdam Conferences.

In 1944, Hill was U.S. Army Air Force commanding officer in charge of Post Hostilities planning for Europe. The same year, he became head of the Air Section of the United States mission to Moscow, then served as commanding general, U.S. Air Force in the U.S.S.R. from December 1944 until May 1945.

Hill coordinated the Inter-American Defense Board before his retirement on November 1, 1946.

== Awards ==
His awards included the Army Distinguished Service Medal, Legion of Merit with oak leaf cluster, Bronze Star, and Air Medal. He was made a Commander of the Order of the British Empire, awarded Legion d'honeur and Croix de Guerre with Palm.
