= USS Philadelphia =

USS Philadelphia may refer to:

- USS Philadelphia (1776) was a gunboat built in 1776 on Lake Champlain and sunk during the Battle of Valcour Island
- USS Philadelphia (1799) was a 36-gun sailing frigate active in the Quasi-War, captured in the First Barbary War and later burned
- USS Philadelphia (1861) was a side-wheel steamer used during the American Civil War, commanded by Samuel Phillips Lee
- USS Philadelphia (C-4) was a protected cruiser commissioned in 1890 and in service until 1926
- USS Philadelphia (CL-41) was a Brooklyn-class light cruiser commissioned 1937, active in World War II, and sold to Brazil in 1951
- USS Philadelphia (SSN-690) was a Los Angeles-class attack submarine commissioned in 1977 and decommissioned in 2010
- USS Philadelphia (LPD-32) is a planned San Antonio-class amphibious transport dock ordered 31 March 2023.
