= Henry Hill (cricketer, born 1851) =

English cricketer

Personal information
- Full name: Henry James Hill
- Born: 8 April 1851; Edmonton, Middlesex, England
- Died: 7 May 1905 (aged 54); Bayswater, London, England
- Batting: Right-handed
- Bowling: Right-arm roundarm medium

Domestic team information
- Years: Team
- 1880–1883: Marylebone Cricket Club

Career statistics
Competition	First-class
Matches	4
Runs scored	31
Batting average	4.42
100s/50s	–/–
Top score	17
Catches/stumpings	1/–
- Source: Cricinfo, 12 June 2021

Henry James Hill (8 April 1851 – 7 May 1905) was an English first-class cricketer.

Hill was born at Edmonton in April 1851. He later played first-class cricket for the Marylebone Cricket Club, making four appearances. He made two appearances in 1880 against Lancashire and Hampshire, followed by an appearance each against Cambridge University in 1882 and Derbyshire in 1883. He had little success in these four matches, scoring 31 runs with a highest score of 17. Hill died at Bayswater in May 1905.
