= Henry Hill (Yorkshire cricketer) =

English cricketer

Personal information
- Born: 29 November 1858; Thornhill, Dewsbury, Yorkshire, U.K.
- Died: 14 August 1935 (aged 76); Headingley, Leeds, Yorkshire, U.K.

Domestic team information
- Years: Team
- 1888–1891: Yorkshire

Henry Hill (29 November 1858 – 14 August 1935) was an English amateur first-class cricketer, who played fourteen matches for Yorkshire County Cricket Club between 1888 and 1891.

Born in Thornhill, Dewsbury, Yorkshire, England, Hill was a right-handed batsman, he scored 337 runs at 13.48 with a best score of 34 against the Australians. He also took 10 catches.

He captained the Dewsbury and Savile club for many years, and served as the Dewsbury representative on the Yorkshire Committee up to his death. He died in Headingley, Leeds, Yorkshire in August 1935.
