= Harry Hills =

English cricketer

Personal information
- Full name: Harry Mountford Hills
- Born: 28 September 1886; Mayland, Essex, England
- Batting: Right-handed
- Role: Bowler

Domestic team information
- Years: Team
- 1912–1919: Essex

Career statistics
Competition	FC
Matches	14
Runs scored	139
Batting average
100s/50s
Top score
Balls bowled
Wickets	15
Bowling average
5 wickets in innings
10 wickets in match
Best bowling
Catches/stumpings
- Source: Cricinfo, 22 July 2013

Harry Hills (28 September 1886, date of death unknown) was an English cricketer. He played for Essex between 1912 and 1919.
