= John W. Reeves Jr. =

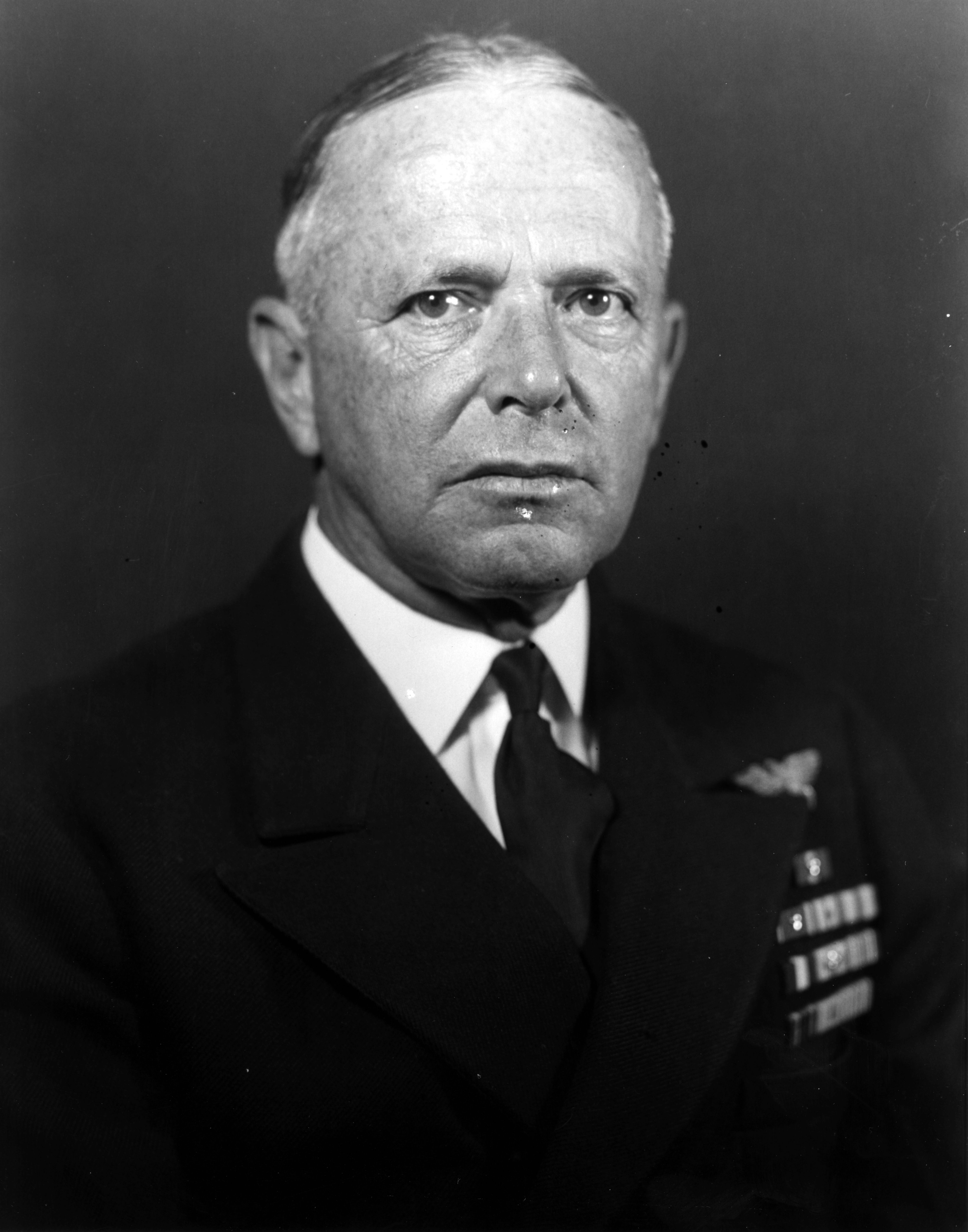
- John Reeves as a Rear Admiral
- Born: April 25, 1888
- Died: July 16, 1967 (aged 79); Pensacola, Florida, U.S.
- Military career
- Allegiance: United States of America
- Branch: United States Navy
- Service years: 1911–1950
- Rank: Admiral
- Nickname: "Black Jack"
- Commands: USS Wasp (CV-7)
- Conflicts: World War I World War II
- Awards: Distinguished Service Medal (2); Legion of Merit (4)

John Walter Reeves Jr. (April 25, 1888 – July 16, 1967) was an admiral of the United States Navy. He graduated from the U.S. Naval Academy in the class of 1915. Among his classmates were future US Navy admirals Morton Deyo, Harry W. Hill, George D. Murray, and Frederick Riefkohl.

Prior to flag rank, Admiral Reeves was the commanding officer of the USS Parrott (DD-218) (June 1928 – June 1929) and USS Wasp (CV-7) (April 1940 – May 1942). He served as the Commander of the Alaskan Sector, Northwest Sea Frontier, during World War II. As such, he led the effort to dislodge Imperial Japan forces from the Aleutian Islands.

Later transferred back to sea duty, Reeves was designated (on 7 Mar 1944), commander, Carrier Division Four (COMCARDIV) Task Group 58.1 hoisting his flag in USS Enterprise (CV-6). Reeves' Task Group 58.3, consisting of the Enterprise, Lexington (CV-16), San Jacinto (CVL-30) and Princeton (CVL-23), played a key role in the Battle of the Philippine Sea on 19–20 June 1944.

Reeves was promoted to vice admiral on April 1, 1949, and advanced to admiral based on his combat service when he retired in May 1950.

A native of Haddonfield, New Jersey, Reeves died at Pensacola, Florida. He is buried in Barrancas National Cemetery.
