= USS Harry W. Hill =

Spruance-class destroyer

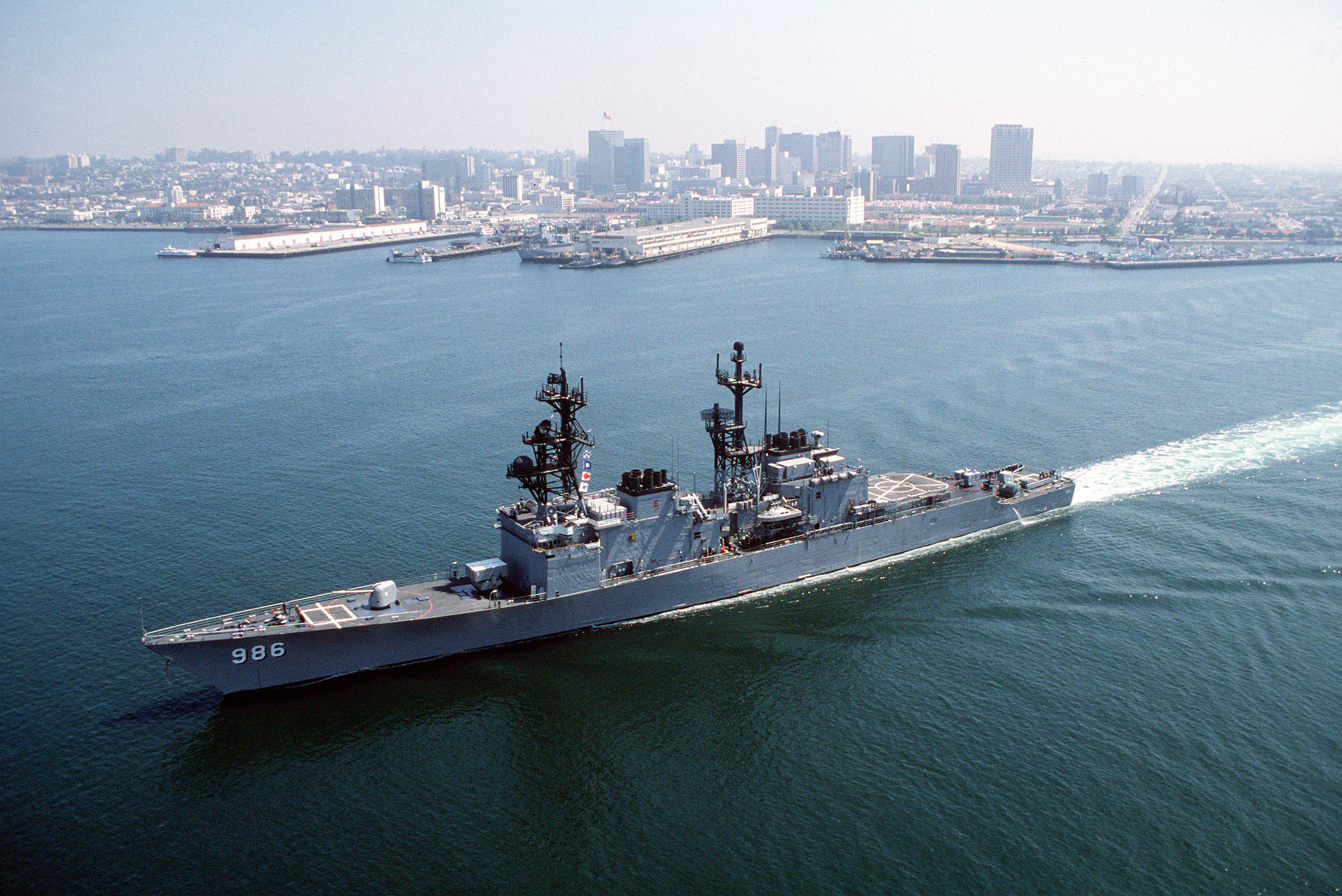
- USS Harry W. Hill leaving San Diego in December 1984

History

United States
- Name: Harry W. Hill
- Namesake: Harry W. Hill
- Ordered: 15 January 1975
- Builder: Ingalls Shipbuilding
- Laid down: 1 April 1977
- Launched: 10 August 1978
- Acquired: 29 October 1979
- Commissioned: 17 November 1979
- Decommissioned: 29 May 1998
- Stricken: 29 May 1998
- Identification: Callsign: NPFS; Hull number: DD-986
- Motto: Speed, Surprise, Success
- Fate: Sunk as target, 15 July 2004
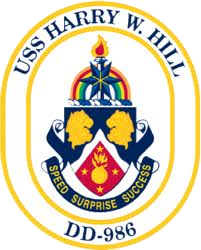
- Badge

General characteristics
- Class & type: Spruance-class destroyer
- Displacement: 8,040 long tons (8,170 t) full load
- Length: 529 ft (161 m) waterline; 563 ft (172 m) overall
- Beam: 55 ft (17 m)
- Draft: 29 ft (8.8 m)
- Propulsion: 4 × General Electric LM2500 gas turbines, 2 shafts, 80,000 shp (60 MW)
- Speed: 32.5 knots (60.2 km/h; 37.4 mph)
- Range: 6,000 nmi (11,000 km; 6,900 mi) at 20 knots (37 km/h; 23 mph)
- Complement: 19 officers, 315 enlisted
- Sensors & processing systems: AN/SPS-40 air search radar; AN/SPG-60 fire control radar; AN/SPS-55 surface search radar; AN/SPQ-9 gun fire control radar; Mark 23 TAS automatic detection and tracking radar; AN/SPS-65 missile fire control radar; AN/SQS-53 bow-mounted active sonar; AN/SQR-19 TACTAS towed array passive sonar; Naval Tactical Data System
- Electronic warfare & decoys: AN/SLQ-32 electronic warfare system; AN/SLQ-25 Nixie torpedo countermeasures; Mark 36 SRBOC decoy launching system; AN/SLQ-49 inflatable decoys
- Armament: 2 × 5 in (127 mm) 54 caliber Mark 45 dual purpose guns; 2 × 20 mm Phalanx CIWS Mark 15 guns; 1 × 8 cell ASROC launcher (removed); 1 × 8 cell NATO Sea Sparrow Mark 29 missile launcher; 2 × quadruple Harpoon missile canisters; 2 × Mark 32 triple 12.75 in (324 mm) torpedo tubes (Mk 46 torpedoes)
- Aircraft carried: 2 × Sikorsky SH-60 Seahawk LAMPS III helicopters
- Aviation facilities: Flight deck and enclosed hangar for up to two medium-lift helicopters

USS Harry W. Hill (DD-986), named for Admiral Harry W. Hill USN, was a Spruance-class destroyer built by the Ingalls Shipbuilding Division of Litton Industries at Pascagoula, Mississippi. Her commissioning sponsor was Mrs. Mary Helen Hill, the admiral's daughter-in-law.

== History ==
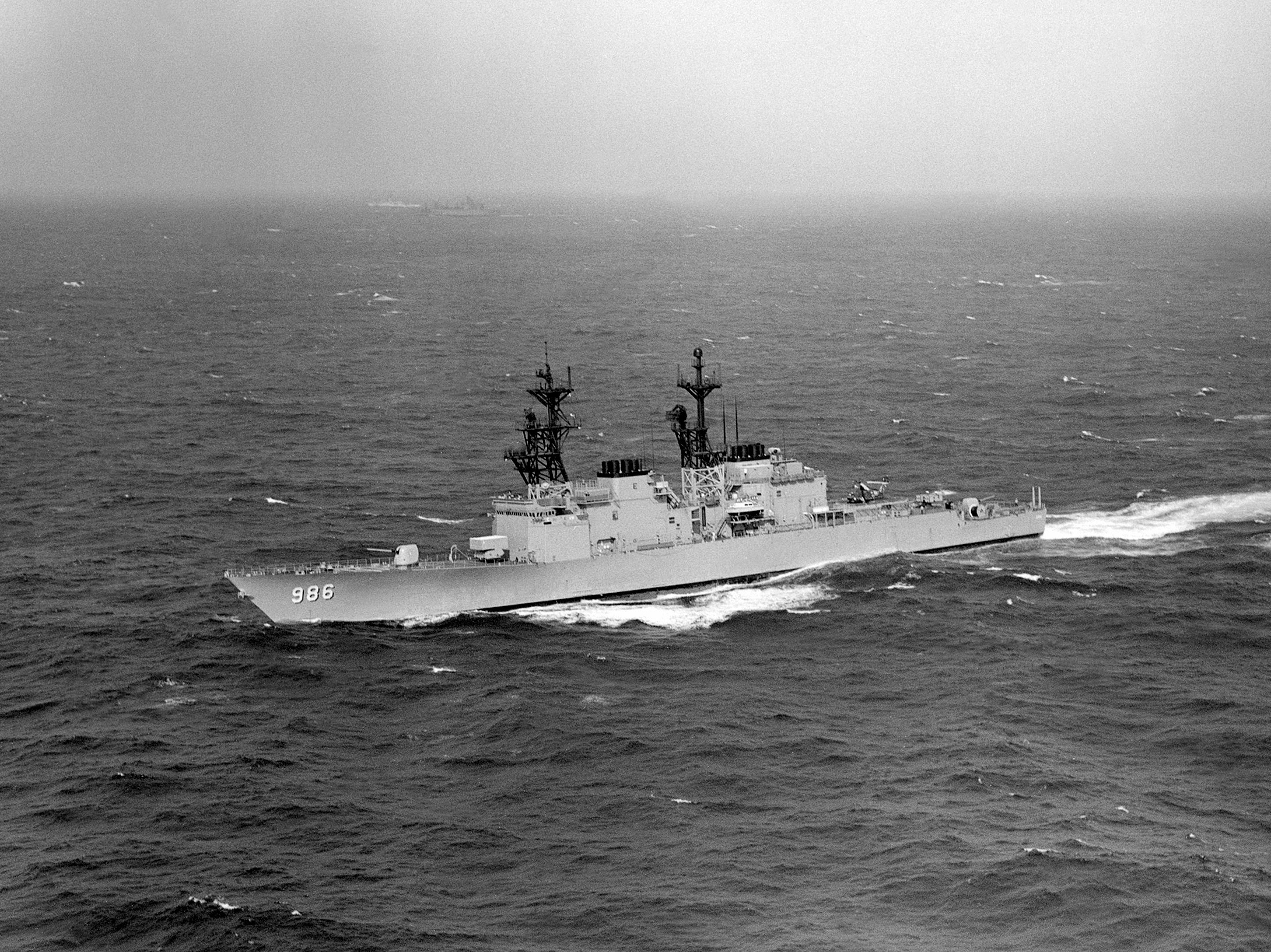
USS Harry W. Hill on 15 October 1982

In late November 1982 Harry W. Hill was detached from the USS Enterprise battle-group to shadow the Soviet aircraft carrier Minsk, which was transiting the Indian Ocean for her first deployment to the Far East, a matter of considerable interest to U.S. planners. As such, Enterprise assigned two intelligence specialists to Harry W. Hill to help in tracking the Russians. Harry W. Hill rejoined the battle-group on 19–20 January 1983.

Harry W. Hill deployed as part of operations Desert Shield and Desert Storm, part of the 1990-1991 Gulf War. On 14 January 1991, she collided with the Wichita class replenishment oiler USS Kansas City while conducting underway replenishment operations in the Gulf of Oman. There were no personnel casualties or injuries reported.

In 1994, Harry W. Hill was significantly damaged during a maneuver to re-float her and exit a dry dock. In the incident, she was caught by a gust of wind which caused the ship to smash into the dry dock. One of the steel wire control lines intended to control the ship parted, seriously injuring two crewmen in the process. The ship sustained damage to her rudders, screws, and controllable prop pitch systems.

Harry W. Hill was the only Spruance-class destroyer not to receive the armored box launchers nor the Mark 41 vertical launch system for firing Tomahawk cruise missiles.

=== Fate ===
She was based at San Diego for much of her career. Harry W. Hill was decommissioned and stricken from the Navy List on 29 May 1998. She was sunk as a target during RIMPAC 2004 on 15 July 2004.

== Gallery ==
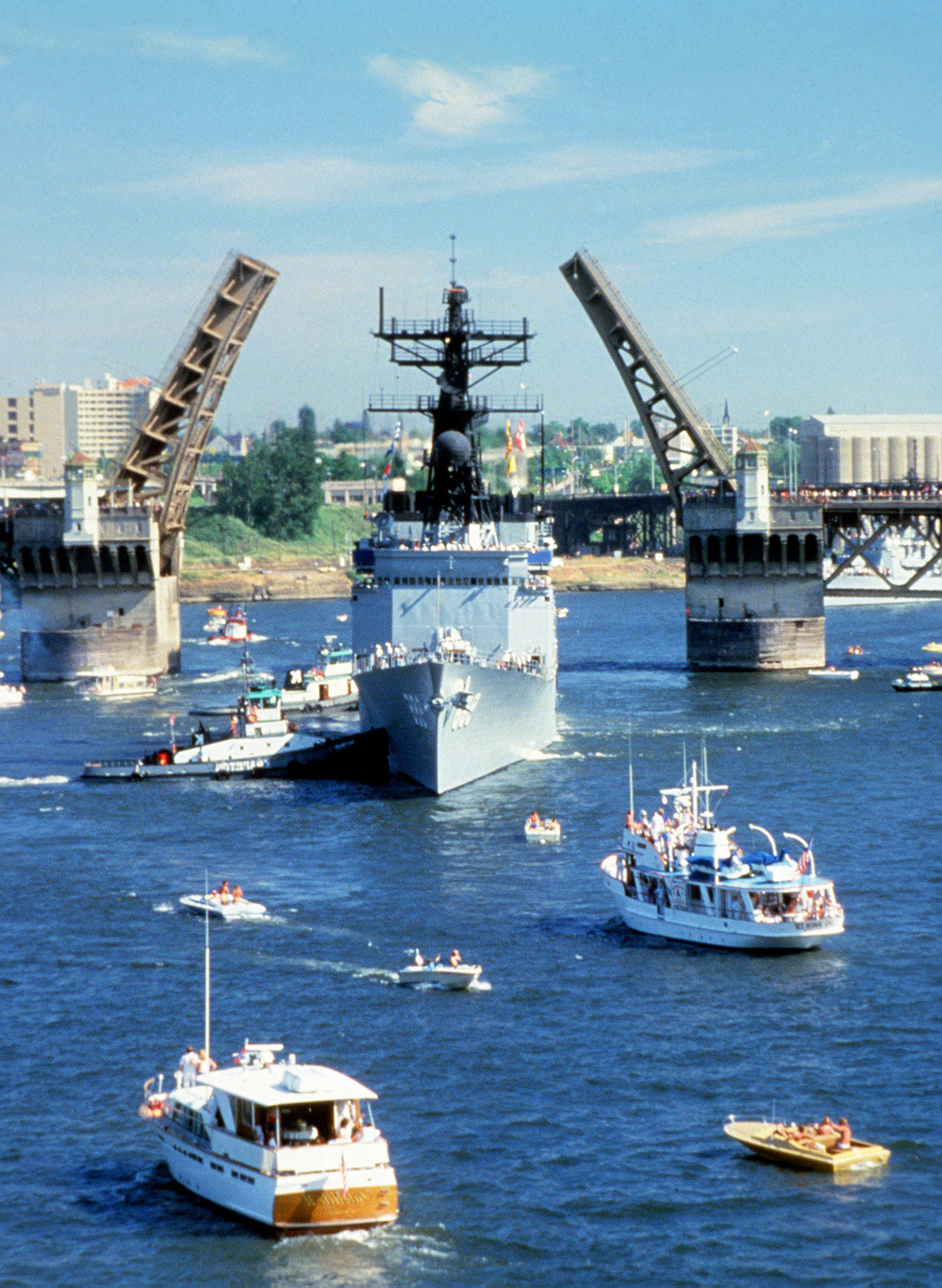
USS Harry W. Hill enters port to participate in the Portland Rose Festival, 1 December 1982

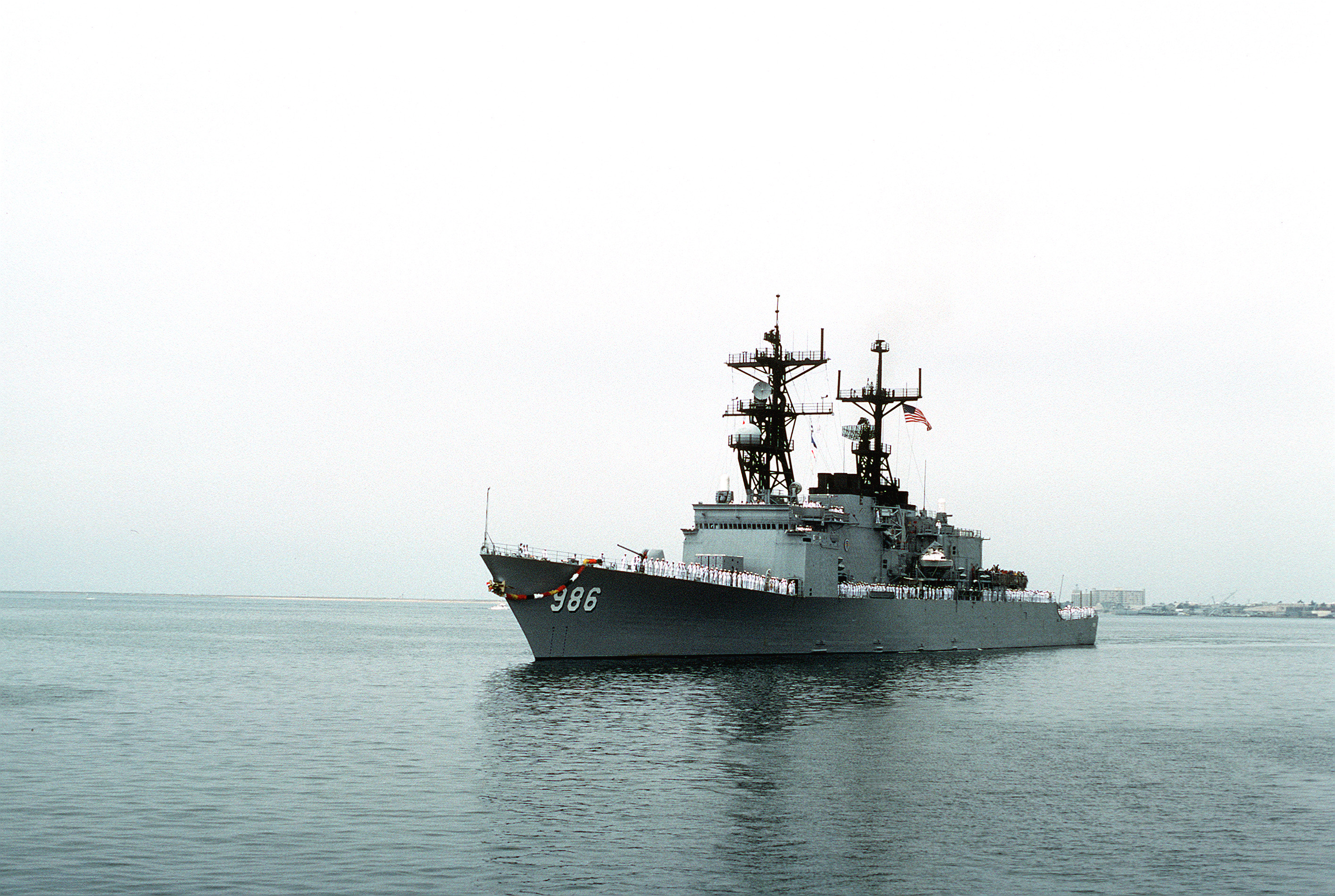
USS Harry W. Hill on 8 June 1991

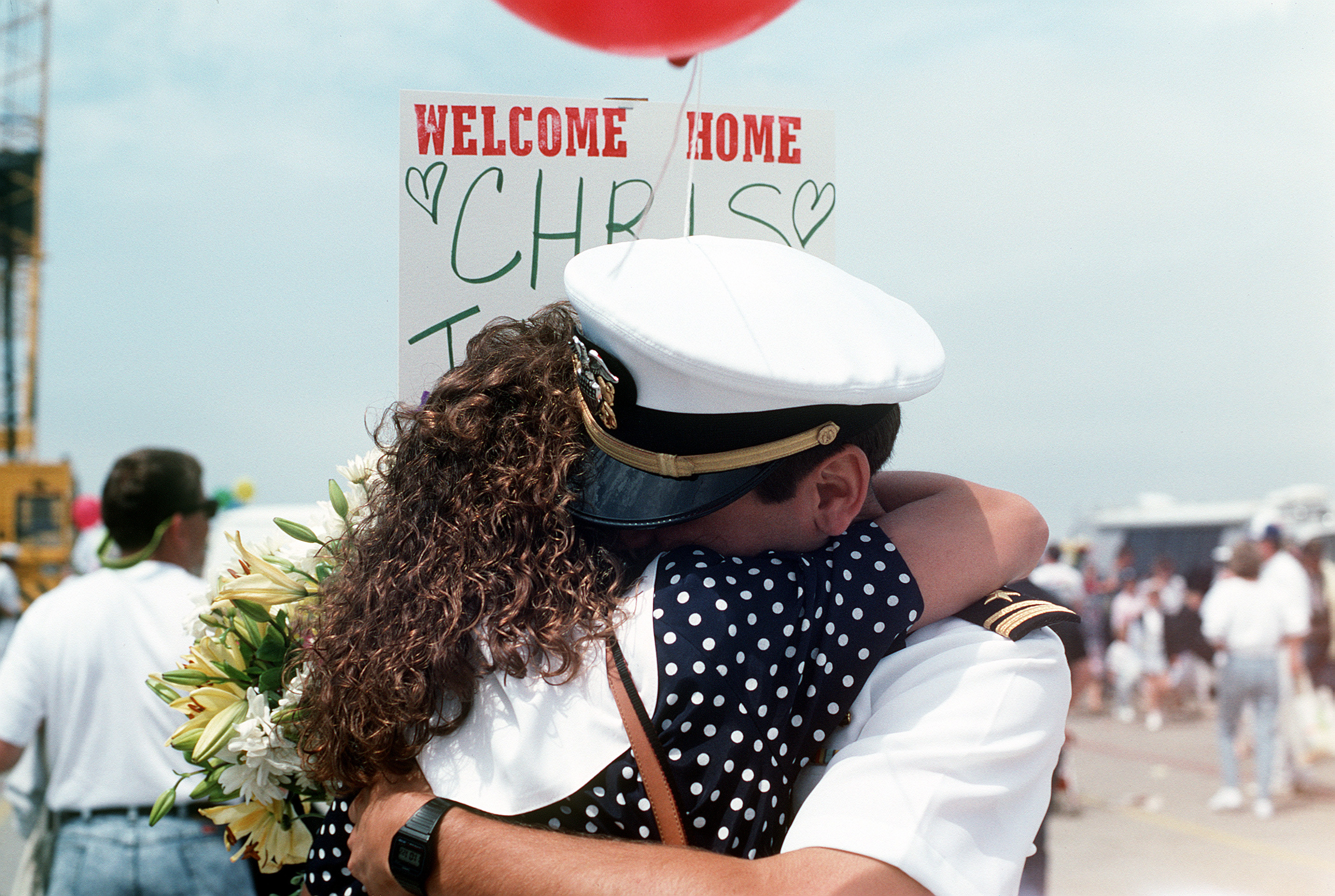
A sailor from the USS Harry W. Hill' returning from a deployment on 8 June 1991

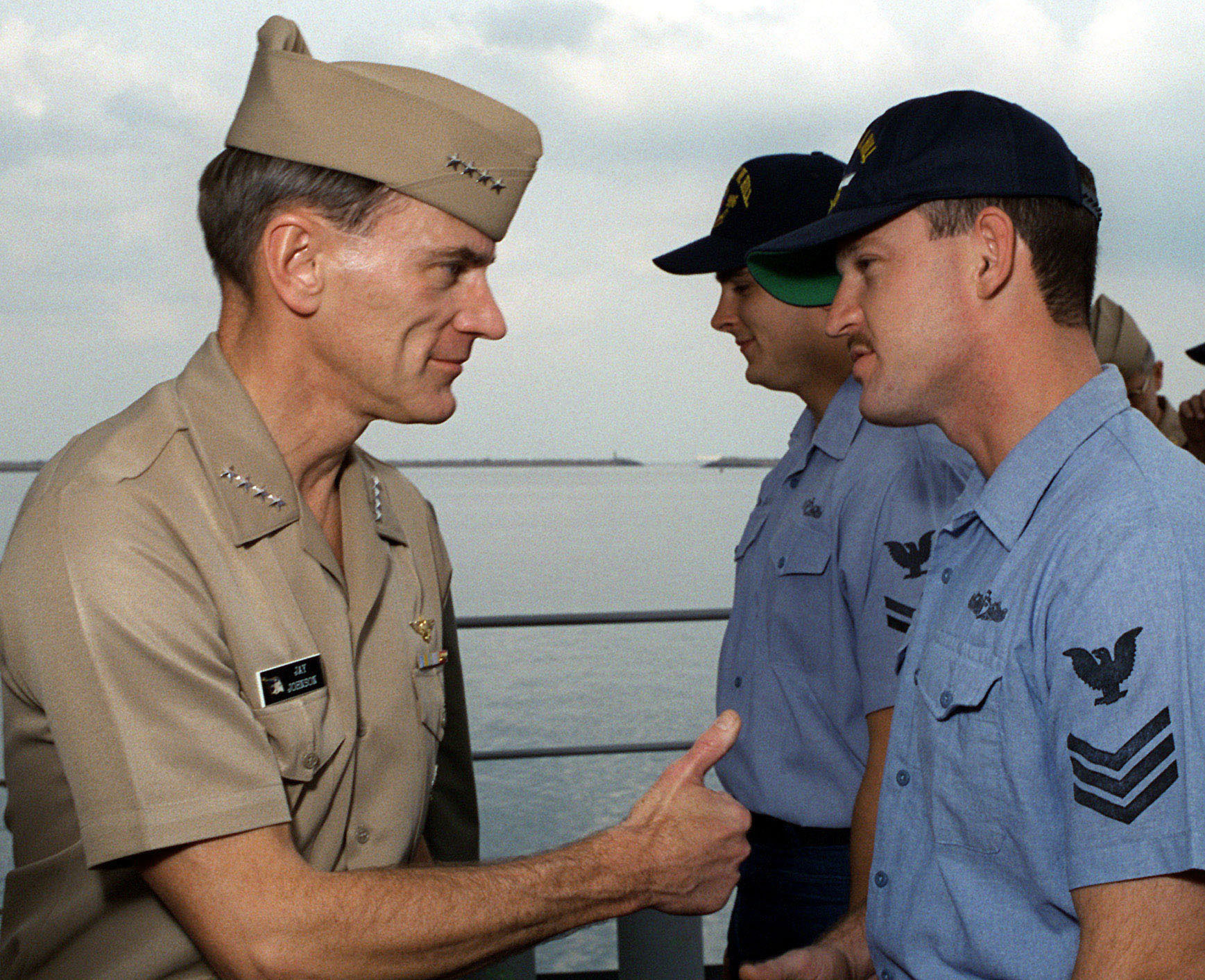
Jay L. Johnson and crewmember aboard USS Harry W. Hill on 24 December 1997

== See also ==
- List of destroyers of the United States Navy
