= Harold Hill Smith =

American geneticist

Harold Hill Smith (April 24, 1910 – October 19, 1994) was an American geneticist who first fused a human cell and a plant cell.

== Life and career ==
Born in Kearny, New Jersey, Smith graduated from Rutgers University and earned master's and doctoral degrees in genetics at Harvard University. He then worked for seven years at the United States Department of Agriculture before serving in the United States Navy in World War II.

He was appointed professor of plant genetics at Cornell University and was senior geneticist at the Brookhaven National Laboratory from 1955 to his retirement in 1978. He died of natural causes in State College, Pennsylvania.
