= Henry Hill (Medal of Honor) =

American soldier (1843–1909)

- Born: April 7, 1843; Schuylkill County, Pennsylvania
- Died: August 2, 1909 (aged 66); Schuylkill Haven, Pennsylvania
- Burial place: Schuylkill Haven Union Cemetery; Schuylkill Haven, Pennsylvania
- Military career
- Allegiance: United States of America; Union
- Branch: United States Army; Union Army
- Rank: Corporal
- Units: Company C, 50th Pennsylvania Volunteer Infantry
- Conflicts: American Civil War
- Awards: Medal of Honor

Henry Hill (July 4, 1843 – August 2, 1909) was a soldier in the Union Army during the American Civil War. He received the Medal of Honor on September 23, 1897.

== Biography ==
Hill was born on July 4, 1843, in Schuylkill County, Pennsylvania, to John and Susan (Woomer) Hill. Married Sarah A. nee Hehn on December 23, 1866, and was the father of ten children.

On May 6, 1864, as a corporal of Company C, 50th Pennsylvania Volunteer Infantry during the Battle of the Wilderness, Hill "refused to retreat and instead advanced inspiring his men and the regiment to recapture their position." Enlisted as a private on August 14, 1861, and discharged on July 30, 1865. Promoted to sergeant on March 20, 1865. Among the battles in which he participated in were: battles of Shenandoah Valley, Spottsylvania, Beufort, Cold Run, Chantilly, Antietam, Fredericksburg, Wilderness and Cold Harbor. Wounded at Cold Harbor.

Hill died on August 2, 1909, and was buried in Schuylkill Haven Union Cemetery, in Schuylkill Haven, Pennsylvania, on August 5, 1909.

== Medal of Honor citation ==
Rank and organization: Corporal, Company C, 50th Pennsylvania Infantry. Place and date: At Wilderness, Va., 6 May 1864.

Citation:

This soldier, with one companion, would not retire when his regiment fell back in confusion after an unsuccessful charge, but instead advanced and continued firing upon the enemy until the regiment re-formed and regained its position.

== See also ==
- List of Medal of Honor recipients
- List of American Civil War Medal of Honor recipients: G–L
