= Harry W. Hill (admiral) =

United States admiral (1890–1971)

Wilbur Hill
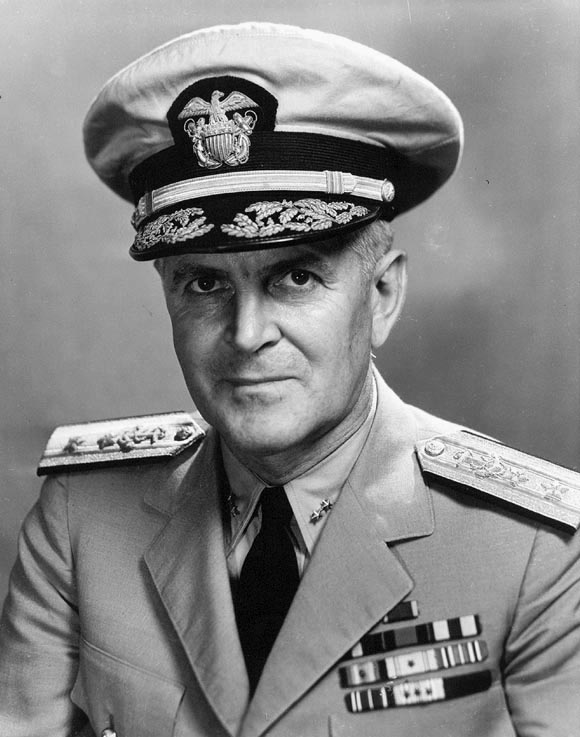
- Born: April 7, 1890; Oakland, California, U.S.
- Died: July 19, 1971 (aged 81); Annapolis, Maryland, U.S.
- Burial place: United States Naval Academy Cemetery
- Military career
- Allegiance: United States
- Branch: United States Navy
- Service years: 1907–1952
- Rank: Vice admiral
- Commands: Dewey; Wichita; Battleship Division Four; Fifth Amphibious Force
- Conflicts: World War I; World War II; Battle of Tarawa; Gilbert and Marshall Islands campaign; Mariana and Palau Islands campaign; Battle of Iwo Jima; Battle of Okinawa
- Awards: Distinguished Service Medal (2); American Defense Service Medal; Asiatic-Pacific Campaign Medal; World War I Victory Medal; World War II Victory Medal

Harry Wilbur Hill (7 April 1890 – July 19, 1971) was a vice admiral in the United States Navy during World War II.

== Biography ==
Hill was born in Oakland, California on 7 April 1890. He entered the United States Naval Academy in 1907 won an Annapolis by competitive examination, graduating in June 1911. His classmates included Morton Deyo, Frank J. Lowry, George D. Murray, John W. Reeves, and Frederick Riefkohl. While attending the Academy Hill played on the basketball and lacrosse teams. Hill completed high school at Oakland High School.

=== Early career ===
After graduation from the Naval Academy, he served successively in the armored cruiser Maryland (ACR-8), torpedo boat tender Iris, and destroyer Perry (DD-11), with the Pacific Flotilla; and as Engineer Officer of the protected cruiser Albany (CL-23).

=== World War I ===
From January 1917 he served on the battleship Texas (BB-35), a part of Battleship Division Nine of the British Grand Fleet during World War I. He transferred in September 1918 to the battleship Wyoming (BB-32), in which he witnessed the surrender of the German High Seas Fleet upon the cessation of hostilities.

=== 1918–1931 ===
On 23 November 1918, he reported as navigator of the battleship Arkansas (BB-33), and served in that capacity until January 1919, when he was assigned duty as aide and flag lieutenant to the Commander Division Seven, Atlantic Fleet. In July of that year, he transferred to similar duty on the staff of Commander Division Six, Pacific Fleet. After serving two months at the Naval Academy, in November 1919 he became aide to the Chief of Naval Operations, where he remained until March 1923.

He assisted in fitting out the Concord (CL-10), at William Cramp & Sons, Philadelphia, and upon the commissioning of that cruiser on 23 November 1923, he joined her as gunnery officer. He served three months from June 1925 as Aide to the commander in chief, U.S. Fleet, after which he had duty afloat as gunnery officer of the light cruiser Memphis (CL-13). He was assigned for two years, June 1926 – 1928, as executive officer of the Receiving Barracks, Hampton Roads, Virginia, then had service from July 1928 to May 1931, as gunnery officer of Maryland (BB-46). He was aboard that battleship in 1929 when she won the Gunnery Trophy and he received a commendatory letter from the Secretary of the Navy.

=== 1931–1942 ===
Returning to the United States, he reported as battalion officer in the Executive Department of the Naval Academy, and from June 1933 to 1934 served as Force gunnery officer on the staff of Commander Battle Force, U.S. Fleet in the Pacific. Ordered to Bath Iron Works, Commander Hill was in charge of fitting out Dewey (DD-349), then commanded that destroyer from her commissioning, from 4 October 1934 until 17 June 1935. He was again assigned to the Office of the Chief of Naval Operations, and in May 1938 completed the Senior Course at the Naval War College.

Between June 1938 and February 1940 he was war plans officer on the staff of the commander in chief, U.S. Fleet, after which he had a third tour of duty in the Office of the Chief of Naval Operations, where Captain Hill was attached to the War Plans Division until January 1942.

=== World War II ===
Ordered to sea, Hill assumed command of the heavy cruiser Wichita (CA-45), which operated for several months on convoy duty with the British Home Fleet to the North Russian port of Murmansk. Hill escorted a convoy that was reported on by Douglas Fairbanks, Jr. In response to 4th of July greetings from the British Convoy commander, from the bridge of the British cruiser Norfolk, "Many happy returns of the day. The United States is the only country with a known birthday", Hill replied "Thank you. I think England should celebrate Mother's Day."

Detached from command of Wichita on 28 September 1942, he reported as commander, Battleship Division Four, Maryland (BB-46), flagship, serving a year in the South Pacific. He was also commander of a task force, which was the first to comprise battleships and escort carriers.

In September 1943 he became Commander Amphibious Group Two, Fifth Amphibious Force, and in that capacity participated in the capture of Tarawa, and later in operations against the Gilberts, Marshalls, Marianas, Iwo Jima, and Okinawa. He relieved the Commander Fifth Amphibious Force at Okinawa in April 1945, and commanded the amphibious and support operations of that force until that island was secured at the end of June.

=== Post-war ===
At the close of the war in August 1945, he commanded the Amphibious Force which landed the Sixth Army in Southwestern Japan for occupation duty. On 1 November 1945 he assumed duty as Commandant Army-Navy Staff College, and in June 1946 Vice Admiral Hill established and served as commandant of the National War College, the highest-level educational institution of the Armed Forces and the State Department. In September 1949 he reported as chairman of the General Board, Navy Department, and on 28 April 1950 became Superintendent of the Naval Academy and commandant, Severn River Naval Command. He continued to serve as such after his retirement on 1 May 1952, until August 1952.

Admiral Hill continued to serve on active duty from 21 October 1952 until 21 May 1954 as governor of the Naval Home, Philadelphia.

Admiral Harry Wilbur Hill died of cancer in Annapolis, Maryland, on July 19, 1971.

== Namesake ==
In 1978, the destroyer USS Harry W. Hill (DD-986) was named in his honor.
