= Attorney General Hill =

Attorney General Hill may refer to:

- Bridget Hill (politician), Attorney General of Wyoming
- Curtis Hill (born 1960s), Attorney General of Indiana
- John Hill (Texas politician) (1923–2007), Attorney General of Texas
- William U. Hill (born 1948), Attorney General of Wyoming
