= Henry Hill (colonial merchant) =

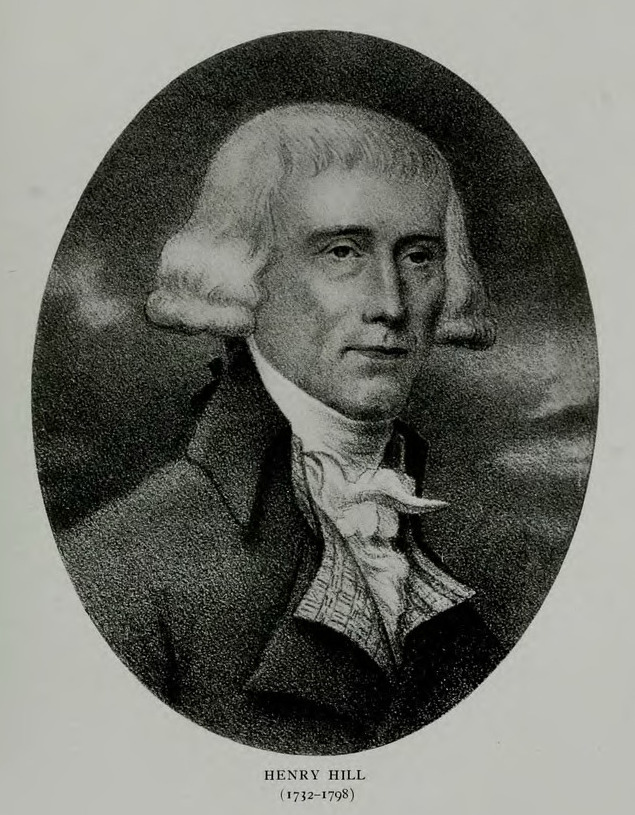
- Born: 1732; Maryland
- Died: 1798 (aged 65–66)

Henry Hill (1732–1798) was an American merchant and politician.

Born on his well-to-do father's plantation in Maryland, Hill studied the mercantile profession and relocated to Philadelphia to enter the Madeira wine trade. Hill was extremely successful in the wine business, selling to regular customers such as George Washington.

In 1771, Hill was elected as a member of the American Philosophical Society. He earned many political accolades. He became Justice of the Peace (1772), joined the Carpenters' Hall conference of the committees of safety (1776), and the Constitutional Convention of 1776. During the Revolutionary War, he served as Colonel of the 4th Battalion of Philadelphia Associators and subscribed five thousand pounds to the Pennsylvania Bank, which provided supplies for the Continental Army. He subscribed to the Bank of North America, and became one of its directors (1781–1792), all the while serving as a member of the Assembly, and of the Executive Council (1785–1788).

In 1798, he died of yellow fever.
