= Henry Root Hill =

United States Army general

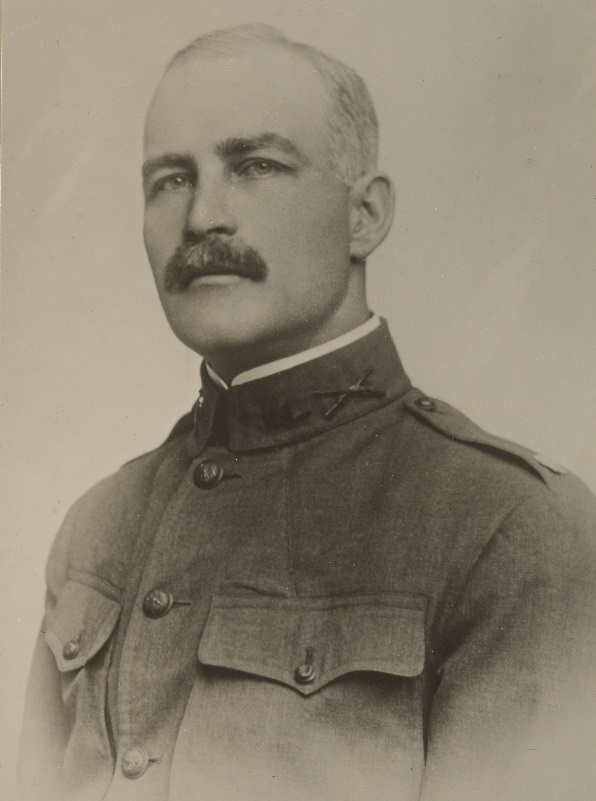
- Born: June 20, 1876; Quincy, Illinois
- Died: October 16, 1918 (aged 42); Romagne-sous-Montfaucon, France
- Burial place: Woodland Cemetery, Quincy, Illinois
- Military career
- Allegiance: United States
- Branch: United States Army
- Service years: 1894–1918
- Rank: Brigadier general
- Unit: Illinois National Guard
- Commands: Provisional Regiment, Illinois National Guard; 2nd Brigade, Illinois National Guard; 2nd Brigade, 12th Provisional Division; 65th Infantry Brigade; 2nd Battalion, 128th Infantry Regiment
- Conflicts: Spanish–American War; Pancho Villa Expedition; World War I
- Awards: Distinguished Service Cross

Henry Root Hill (June 20, 1876 – October 16, 1918) was a United States Army officer in the late 19th and early 20th centuries. He served in World War I and was killed in the conflict.

== Early life ==
Hill was born in Quincy, Illinois, on June 20, 1876, a son of Frederick T. Hill and Cecelia (Root) Hill. He was educated in the public schools of Quincy and worked at F. T. Hill Co., his father's furniture and carpeting dealership. After his father died in 1905, Hill succeeded him as the owner and manager.

== Start of military career ==
In 1894, Hill enlisted in the Illinois National Guard as a private assigned to Company F, 4th Infantry Regiment. He advanced through the ranks to first sergeant of his company. During the Spanish–American War, his unit was mobilized as part of the United States Volunteers and trained at Camp George H. Thomas, Georgia, then returned to Illinois after the end of the war eliminated the need for their continued service. He was commissioned as a second lieutenant in 1899. Hill was promoted to captain in 1902, commanded Company F, and later served as adjutant of the 5th Regiment. He was promoted lieutenant colonel in 1908 as second-in-command of the 5th Regiment. In early 1914, Hill was assigned to command of a provisional regiment in the Illinois National Guard. In late 1914, he was promoted to brigadier general as commander of the Illinois National Guard's 2nd Brigade.

In 1916, Hill served on the U.S. border with Mexico during the Pancho Villa Expedition as commander of 2nd Brigade, 12th Provisional Division. After race riots in East St. Louis, Illinois, to which the Illinois National Guard responded, Hill was appointed president of the commission that investigated the Guard's actions.

== World War I ==
On July 25, 1917, three months after the American entry into World War I, Hill became a brigadier general of the National Army, and he led the 65th Infantry Brigade during training in the United States and deployment to France. He was relieved of command during a routine training exercise in July 1918 as the result of an incident that was never definitively explained. The most common version of the story is that the commander of the 33rd Division, George Bell Jr., relieved Hill after soldiers from his brigade were observed not wearing their steel helmets, a violation of Bell's orders. In fact, as Bell later indicated, Bell relieved Hill because Bell, a regular army officer, disapproved of having a National Guard officer commanding a brigade. In addition, since Hill was the senior brigadier general in the 33rd Division, Bell opposed a National Guard officer's likely succession to division command if Bell was reassigned or became a casualty. Bell's action against Hill earned him the displeasure of many officers in the division, especially because Bell ordered his chief of staff, Colonel William K. Naylor, to deliver the news to Hill even though Naylor and Hill were friends. Hill was offered a discharge at his brigadier general's rank or a colonel's commission in the Service of Supply, both of which he refused. Instead, he insisted on serving on the front lines and accepted a major's commission in the Infantry on August 29, 1918.

Hill commanded 2nd Battalion, 128th Infantry Regiment, a unit of the 32nd Division during combat in France. The commander of the 128th Infantry, Colonel Robert Bruce McCoy requested Root for battalion command because McCoy and Hill had worked together during the Villa expedition. When McCoy's staff position during his Mexican border service was eliminated because of changed circumstances, Hill arranged for McCoy's assignment as Hill's brigade adjutant. McCoy developed an appreciation for Hill's leadership qualities, and requested his assignment to the 128th Regiment after being informed that he was available.

On October 16, 1918, Hill was killed in action during fighting near Romagne-sous-Montfaucon as part of the Meuse-Argonne Offensive. Having led his battalion through a maze of enemy machine gun nests to reach his objective, Hill observed the four-man crew of another machine gun preparing to open fire on his men. He charged them, and took three Germans as prisoners, but was killed by the fourth. He posthumously received the Distinguished Service Cross.

== Distinguished Service Cross citation ==
"The President of the United States of America, authorized by Act of Congress, July 9, 1918, takes pride in presenting the Distinguished Service Cross (Posthumously) to Major (Infantry) Henry R. Hill, United States Army, for extraordinary heroism in action while serving with 128th Infantry Regiment, 32d Division, A.E.F., near Romagne-sous-Montfaucon, France, 16 October 1918. With absolute disregard for his personal safety, Major Hill led his battalion over the top personally reached the objective, and cleaned out enemy machine-gun nests. When a group of enemy machine gunners were about to open fire on his flank, Major Hill noticed them, and, armed only with a captured pistol, he immediately went forward to engage them. Taken by surprise, three of the crew surrendered, but one, remaining in the pit, turned the machine gun on him; and as Major Hill’s pistol failed to work he was instantly killed by the machine-gun fire."

General Orders: War Department, General Orders No. 35 (1919)

== Burial ==
Hill was originally buried in France. In 1921, his remains were returned to the United States and he was buried at Woodland Cemetery in Quincy, Illinois. In 1930, Congress passed legislation permitting World War I general officers to retire at the highest rank they had held, and Hill's rank of brigadier general was posthumously restored.

== Legacy ==
Hill never married and had no children. After his death his mother had a fountain in Quincy dedicated to his memory. The Henry Root Hill Memorial Hospital at the Illinois Soldiers and Sailors Home in Quincy was named for him, as was Quincy's Henry R. Hill American Legion post (now the Hill-Emery post).
