= Hill (surname) =

- Language: English, Scottish

Origin
- Meaning: "a person who lived on a hill"
- Region of origin: England, Scotland

Other names
- Variant forms: Hyll, Hull

Hill is a surname of English and Scottish origin, meaning "a person who lived on a hill". It is the 36th most common surname in England, the 18th common surname in Scotland, and the 37th most common surname in the United States.

== A ==
- A. P. Hill (1825–1865), Confederate Army general
- A. T. Hill (1871–1953), American archaeologist
- Aaron Hill (writer) (1685–1750), British writer
- Aaron Hill (baseball) (born 1982), American baseball player
- Aaron Hill (snooker player) (born 2002), Irish professional snooker player
- Aaron Hill (actor) (born 1983), American actor
- Abby Williams Hill (1861–1943), American painter
- Abraham Hill (1633–1721), British merchant
- Abram Hill (1910–1986), American dramatist
- Achim Hill (1935–2015), East German rower
- Adam Hill (rugby union) (born 1986), New Zealand rugby union player
- Adin Hill (born 1996), Canadian ice hockey player
- Adrian Hill (American football official), American football official
- Adrian Hill (1895–1977), English painter
- Adrian V. S. Hill (born 1958), Irish vaccinologist
- Adrienne Hill (1937–1997), English actress
- Agnes Leonard Hill (1842–1917), American journalist
- Ahmed Hill (born 1995), American basketball player
- Al Hill (ice hockey) (born 1955), Canadian ice hockey player
- Al Hill (actor) (1892–1954), American actor
- Alan Hill (cricketer) (born 1950), English cricketer and umpire
- Alan Hill (author) (1928–2021), English cricket writer
- Alan Richard Hill (1859–1944), Recipient of the Victoria Cross
- Alannah Hill (born 1963), Australian fashion designer
- Albert G. Hill (1910–1996), American physicist
- Albert Hill (athlete) (1889–1969), British athlete
- Albert Hill (American football) (1896–1969), American football player
- Albert Hill (VC) (1895–1971), British Army Victoria Cross recipient
- Albert Ross Hill (1868–1943), American academic administrator
- Alec Hill (1916–2008), Australian historian
- Alex Hill (musician) (1906–1937), American jazz pianist
- Alex Kedoh Hill (born 1990), Haudenosaunee lacrosse player
- Alexander Hill (neurologist) (1856–1929), English medical doctor and professor
- Alexander Hill (rower) (born 1993), Australian rower
- Alexander Hill (minister) (1785–1867), Scottish minister
- Alexander Staveley Hill (1825–1905), British barrister and politician
- Alfred Hill (composer) (1869–1960), Australian composer and conductor
- Alfred Hill (bishop) (1901–1969), Anglican bishop
- Alfred Hill (cricketer, born 1887) (1887–1959), English cricketer
- Alfred John Hill (1862–1927), British engineer
- Alice Hill (born 1956), American judge and climate policy academic
- Alice Polk Hill (1849–1921), American poet
- Allen Hill (cricketer) (1843–1910), English cricketer
- Allen Hill (scientist) (1937–2021), British chemist
- Ally Hill (1934–2018), Scottish footballer
- Alsager Hay Hill (1839–1906), English social reformer
- Amelia Robertson Hill (1821–1904), Scottish artist and sculptor
- Amy Hill (born 1953), American actress
- Andrew Hill (pianist) (1931–2007), American jazz pianist and composer
- Andrew Hill (footballer) (born 1980), Australian rules footballer
- Andrew P. Hill (1853–1922), American artist, photographer and conservationist
- Andy Hill (composer) (born 1957), English record producer and songwriter
- Andy Hill (footballer) (born 1965), English footballer
- Andy Hill (American music producer) (born 1951), American composer
- Andy Hill (basketball) (born c. 1950), American basketball player and entertainment executive
- Andy Hill (politician) (1962–2016), American politician
- Angela Burks Hill (born 1965), American politician
- Angela Hill (born 1985), American mixed martial artist
- Angela Hill (journalist) (born 1949), American journalist
- Anita C. Hill (born 1951), American Lutheran minister
- Anita Hill (born 1956), American law professor and accuser of Clarence Thomas
- Anna Healy, Baroness Healy of Primrose Hill (born 1955), British politician
- Anne T. Hill (1916–1999), American fashion designer and yoga teacher
- Annie Hill (born 1955), British sailor and writer
- Anthoney Hill (born 1971), American gridiron football player
- Anthony F. Hill, Australian chemist
- Anthony Hill (artist) (1930–2020), English artist, mathematician
- Anthony Hill (tight end) (born 1985), American football player
- Anthony Hill (squash player) (born 1969), Australian squash player
- Anthony Hill (author) (born 1942), Australian author based in Canberra
- Anthony Hill (rugby union) (born 1973), Australian rugby union player
- Anthony Lester, Baron Lester of Herne Hill (1936–2020), British politician and barrister
- Archibald Hill (1886–1977), British physiologist
- Armond Hill (born 1953), American basketball player and coach
- Arthur Edwin Hill (1888–1966), British water polo player
- Arthur Hill (Canadian actor) (1922–2006), Canadian actor
- Arthur Hill (politician) (1873–1913), British soldier and Unionist politician
- Arthur Hill (Australian cricketer) (1871–1936), Australian cricketer
- Arthur Hill (architect) (1846 – 1921), Irish architect
- Arthur J. Hill (1948–1995), American banker
- Arthur William Hill (1875-1941), British botanist and taxonomist
- Arty Hill, American singer-songwriter
- Asher Hill (born 1991), Canadian ice dancer
- Ashton Hill (born 1995), Australian rules footballer
- Aubrey Hill (1972–2020), American football player and coach
- Austin Bradford Hill (1897–1991), English epidemiologist and statistician
- Austin Hill (born 1994), American racing driver
- Averill Hill (died 1814), Irish Anglican priest

== B ==
- B. J. Hill (American football) (born 1995), American football player
- B. J. Hill (basketball) (born 1973), American basketball coach
- Baron Hill (politician) (born 1953), American politician
- Barry Hill (Australian writer) (born 1943), Australian historian, poet, journalist and academic
- Barry Hill (American football) (1953–2010), American football player
- Basil Hill (1880–1960), England international rugby union player & British Army major general
- Beau Hill, American record producer
- Bec Hill (born 1986), Australian comedian, writer, presenter, actor, director, and YouTuber
- Becky Hill (born 1994), British singer
- Belden Hill (1864–1934), American baseball player
- Ben Hill (cyclist) (born 1990), Australian cyclist
- Benjamín G. Hill (1874-1920), Mexican general
- Benjamin Harvey Hill (1823–1882), American politician
- Benjamin J. Hill (1825–1880), American politician
- Benjamin Mako Hill (born 1980), Debian hacker, intellectual property researcher, activist and author
- Bennett D. Hill (1934–2005), American historian and Benedictine monk
- Bennett Hill (1893–1977), American racing driver
- Benny Hill (1924–1992), English comedy actor
- Bernard Hill (1944–2024), English actor
- Bert Hill (American football) (born 1958), American football player and coach
- Bert Hill (1930–2017), English footballer
- Bert Hodge Hill (1874–1958), American archeologist
- Bertha Hill (1905–1950), American blues and vaudeville singer and dancer
- Bertie Hill (1927–2005), British equestrian
- Betsy Hill, American rugby union player
- Betty Hill (politician) (1937–2013), Canadian politician
- Bill Hill (geneticist) (1940–2021), English geneticist and statistician
- Bill Hill (baseball) (1874–1938), American baseball player
- Billy Hill (songwriter) (1899–1940), American songwriter and lyricist
- Billy Hill (gangster) (1911–1984), English criminal
- Blind Joe Hill (1931–1999), American drummer
- Bob Hill (born 1948), American basketball coach
- Bob Hill (politician) (born 1940), Jersey politician
- Bob Hill (American football) (1891–1942), American football player
- Bob Hill (footballer) (1867–1938), Scottish footballer
- Bobby Hill (Australian footballer) (born 2000), Australian rules footballer
- Bobby Hill (baseball) (born 1978), American baseball player
- Bobby Hill (motorcyclist) (1922–2022), American motorcycle racer
- Bobby Hill (Scottish footballer) (born 1938), Scottish footballer
- Bobby Joe Hill (1943–2002), American basketball player
- Boyd Hill (1878–1908), American football and basketball coach
- Brad Hill (baseball) (born 1962), American baseball coach and player
- Brad Hill (basketball) (born 1986), Australian basketball player
- Brad Hill (producer) (born 1981), American record producer
- Bradford Hill (born 1967), American politician
- Bradley Hill (footballer) (born 1993), Australian rules footballer
- Breckie Hill (born 2003), American influencer
- Brendan Hill, American drummer
- Brendan Hill (rugby league) (born 1964), English rugby league footballer
- Brenn Hill (born 1976), American musician
- Brent Hill (politician) (born 1949), American politician
- Brett Hill (1944–2002), Australian swimmer
- Brian Hill (Oklahoma politician), American politician and businessman
- Brian Hill (basketball) (born 1947), American basketball coach
- Brian Hill (referee) (born 1947), English football referee
- Brian Hill (swimmer) (born 1982), Canadian Paralympic swimmer
- Brian Hill (American football) (born 1995), American football player
- Brian Hill (author), Canadian director and playwright
- Brian Hill (Ohio politician), American politician
- Brian Hill (footballer, born 1942), English footballer
- Brian Hill (ice hockey) (born 1957), Austrian-Canadian ice hockey player
- Brian Hill (diplomat) (1919–1998), Australian diplomat
- Brian Hill (director), British film and TV director
- Brian Hill (footballer, born 1937) (1937–1968), English footballer
- Brian Hill (chef), American chef and television personality
- Bridget Hill (politician) (born 1974), American lawyer
- Bronson Hill (born 1993), American football player
- Bronwyn Hill (born 1960), British civil servant
- Bruce Hill (racing driver) (1949–2017), American racing driver
- Bruce Hill (American football) (born 1964), American football player
- Bryan Edward Hill, American writer and graphic designer
- Buck Hill (musician) (1927–2017), American musician
- Bunker Hill (musician) (1941–86), American musician
- Burton Hill (1883–1963), Canadian politician
- Byron Hill (born 1953), American singer-songwriter

== C ==
- Calvin Hill (born 1947), American football player and sports executive, father of basketball player Grant Hill
- Carl Alexander Gibson-Hill (1911–1963), British physician, naturalist and museum curator
- Carl Fredrik Hill (1849–1911), Swedish painter
- Lady Charlotte Hill (1794–1821), daughter of Arthur Hill, 2nd Marquess of Downshire
- Lady Charlotte Augusta Hill (1815–1861), daughter of Arthur Hill, 3rd Marquess of Downshire and wife of Sir George Chetwynd, 3rd Baronet
- Carole Hill, American anthropologist and professor.
- Channing Hill (born 1987), American jockey
- Charles A. Hill (politician) (1833–1902), American politician
- Charles Christopher Hill (born 1948), American artist and printmaker
- Charles D. Hill (1873–1926), American architect
- Charles E. Hill (1881–1936), American political scientist
- Charles Hill (American football) (born 1980), American football player
- Charles Hill (diplomat) (1936–2021), American diplomat and academic
- Charles Hill (painter) (1824–1915), Australian painter
- Charles Lumley Hill (1840–1909), Australian politician
- Charles W. L. Hill, British-born academic
- Charlie Hill (1951–2013), Native American actor and comedian
- Charlie Hill (footballer) (1918–1998), Welsh footballer
- Charlotte Hill (1849–1930), American homesteader and specimen collector
- Charlton Hill (born 1975), Australian singer
- Chloe Hill (born 1997), English cricketer
- Chris Hill (rugby league) (born 1987), Great Britain and England international rugby league footballer
- Chris Hill (DJ) (1945–2025), British disc jockey
- Chris Hill (basketball) (born 1983), American basketball player
- Chris Hill (athletic director), American college athletics administrator and former basketball player and coach
- Chris Hill (point guard) (born 1983), American basketball player and coach
- Christopher Hill (historian) (1912–2003), English historian
- Christopher Hill (bishop) (born 1945), British bishop
- Christopher Hill (political scientist) (born 1948), British political scientist
- Christopher R. Hill (born 1952), American diplomat
- Christopher S. Hill (born 1942), American philosopher
- Christopher T. Hill (born 1951), American theoretical physicist
- Cindy Hill (golfer) (born 1948), American golfer
- Claire Ortiz Hill (1951–2025), American philosopher
- Clara Hill, German musician
- Clarence Hill (boxer) (born 1951), Bermudian boxer
- Clarence Hill (murderer) (1957–2006), American murderer
- Claude Hill (1866–1934), Lieutenant Governor of the Isle of Man
- Claudia Hill (born 1969), Interdisciplinary artist based in Berlin
- Clay Hill (lacrosse) (born 1976), Canadian lacrosse player
- Clayton Hill (actor) (1931–2009), American actor
- Clem Hill (1877–1945), Australian cricketer
- Clement Lloyd Hill (1845–1913), British diplomat and politician
- Clement S. Hill (1813–1892), American politician
- Cleo Hill (1938–2015), American basketball player
- Cliff Hill (rugby league) (1943–2021), English rugby league footballer
- Cliff Hill (baseball) (1893–1938), American baseball player
- Clint Hill (Secret Service) (1932–2025), U.S. Secret Service agent
- Clint Hill (footballer) (born 1978), English footballer
- Clinton Hill (athlete) (born 1980), Australian sprinter
- Clinton Hill (artist) (1922–2003), American abstract artist
- Clive Hill (born 1958), British actor
- Clyde Hill (footballer) (1895–1965), Australian rules footballer
- Colin Hill (footballer) (born 1963), Northern Irish footballer
- Colin Hill (priest) (born 1942), English Anglican priest and author
- Collin Hill (born 1997), American football player
- Conleth Hill (born 1964), Irish actor
- Connie Hill (1918–2001), Canadian ice hockey player
- Corey Hill (1978–2015), American mixed martial artist
- Cornelius Hill (1834–1907), Oneida leader
- Cowboy Hill (American football) (1899–1966), American football player

== D ==
- Dalonte Hill (born 1979), American basketball coach
- Dametri Hill (born 1974), American basketball player
- Damian Hill (c. 1976–2018), Australian actor
- Damien Hill, Australian rugby union coach
- Damon Hill (born 1960), British racing driver
- Dan Hill (born 1954), Canadian singer
- Dan Hill (rugby league) (born 2002), English rugby league footballer
- Dan Hill (American football) (1917–1989), American football player
- Dana Hill (1964–1996), American actress
- Daniel G. Hill (1923–2003), American-Canadian sociologist
- Daniel Harvey Hill (1821–1889), Confederate Army general
- Daniel Harvey Hill Jr. (1859–1924), American academic
- Daniel Hill (actor) (born 1956), British actor
- Daniella Hill (born 1991), American athlete
- Danielle Hill (swimmer) (born 1999), Swimmer
- Danielle Hill (born 1988), English footballer
- Danny Hill (footballer) (born 1974), English footballer
- Danny Hill (rugby league) (born 1984), English rugby league footballer
- Darius Hill (born 1985), American football player
- Darlene Hill (born 1989), American artistic gymnast
- Darrell Hill (shot putter) (born 1993), American shot putter
- Darrell Hill (American football) (born 1979), American football player
- Darren Hill (footballer) (born 1981), Scottish footballer
- Darryl Hill (snooker player) (born 1996), British snooker player
- Darryl Hill (American football) (born 1943), American football player
- Darryn Hill (born 1974), Australian cyclist
- Daryll Hill (born 1982), American basketball player
- Dave Hill (guitarist) (born 1946), English musician
- Dave Hill (actor) (born 1945), British actor
- Dave Hill (golfer) (1937–2011), American professional golfer
- Dave Hill (American football) (1941–2022), American football player
- Dave Hill (politician) (born 1945), British Marxist politician and academic
- Dave Hill (automotive engineer) (born 1943), American automotive engineer
- Dave Hill (footballer) (born 1966), English footballer and manager
- Dave Hill (baseball) (1937–2018), American baseball player
- Dave Hill (screenwriter) (born 1984), American television writer
- David B. Hill (1843–1910), American politician
- David Hill (businessman) (born 1946), English-born Australian businessman and historian
- David Hill (Oregon politician) (1809–1850), American pioneer and Oregon politician
- David Hill (choral director) (born 1957), English choral director and organist
- David Hill (tight end) (born 1954), American football player
- David Hill (author) (born 1942), New Zealand author
- David Hill (producer) (born 1946), American film producer
- David Hill (Labour adviser) (1948–2024), British political adviser
- David Hill (Canadian politician), Canadian politician
- David Hill (rugby union) (born 1978), New Zealand rugby union player
- David Hill (missionary) (1840–1896), British missionary
- David Hill (rugby league) (1946–2025), English rugby league footballer
- David Hill (Rangers footballer), Scottish footballer
- David Jayne Hill (1850–1932), American diplomat
- David Keynes Hill (1915–2002), British biophysicist
- David Octavius Hill (1802–1870), Scottish painter, photographer and arts activist
- Dawn Hill (born 1969), American attorney and Democratic politician from Maine
- Daxton Hill (born 2000), American football player
- Dean Hill (born 1984), Iroquois lacrosse player
- Debbie Hill (born 1960), British swimmer
- Debra Hill (1950–2005), American film producer
- Declan Hill, Canadian journalist and academic
- Delano Hill (born 1975), Dutch footballer
- Delmas Carl Hill (1906–1989), American judge
- Dennis Hill (1929–2020), English footballer
- Denys Hill (1896–1971), English cricketer
- Derek Hill (painter) (1916–2000), English painter
- Derek Hill (baseball) (born 1995), American baseball player
- Derek Hill (gridiron football) (1967–2012), American gridiron football player
- Derek R. Hill, American production designer
- Dewayne Hill, American politician from Georgia
- Dewey L. Hill (1925–2023), American politician
- Diana Hill (scientist) (1943–2024), New Zealand biochemist
- Dick Hill (narrator), American audiobook narrator
- Dick Hill (gridiron football) (born 1934), American gridiron football player
- Douglas Hill (1935–2007), Canadian science fiction author, editor and reviewer
- Douglas Hill (musician) (born 1946), American composer, author and French horn soloist
- Drew Hill (1956–2011), American football wide receiver
- Dulé Hill (born 1975), American actor
- Dusty Hill (1949–2021), American musician associated with the band ZZ Top
- Dwayne Hill (born 1966), Canadian actor

== E ==
- E. D. Hill (born 1962), American journalist
- E.V. Hill (1933–2003), Pastor of Los Angeles mega-church
- Ebenezer J. Hill (1845–1917), American politician
- Ed Hill, American country music songwriter
- Ed Hill (politician), American politician
- Ed Hill (comedian) (born 1984), Canadian stand-up comedian
- Eddie Hill (born 1936), American drag racer
- Edmund Hill (1896–1973), United States Army general
- Edward Burlingame Hill (1872–1960), American composer
- Edward H. Hill (1844–1904), American physician
- Edward Hill (physician) (born 1938), American physician
- Edward Hill (painter) (1843–1923), American painter and writer
- Edward Hill (Virginian politician) (died c. 1662), Virginia planter, soldier and politician
- Edward Hill Jr. (1637–1700), Virginia planter, local official and politician
- Edward Hill (New Zealand politician) (1907–2001), New Zealand clergyman and mayor
- Edward Stock Hill (1834–1902), British shipowner and Conservative Party politician
- Edwin D. Hill (1937–2018), American labor union leader
- Edwin Hill (engineer) (1793–1876), English postal official and inventor
- Edwin J. Hill (1894–1941), US Navy Medal of Honor recipient
- Edwin St Hill (1907–1957), West Indian cricketer
- Efrem Hill (born 1983), American football player
- EJ Hill (born 1985), American artist
- Eliza Trask Hill (1840–1908), American suffragist, journalist, philanthropist
- Elizabeth Hill (linguist) (1900–1996), British linguist
- Elizabeth Hill (screenwriter) (1901–1978), American screenwriter
- Ellsworth Jerome Hill (1833–1917), American Presbyterian minister and botanist
- Elsie Hill (1883–1970), American suffragist
- Emily Hill (1847–1930), New Zealand politician and suffragist
- Emma Hill (film editor), American film editor
- Emmeline Hill, Irish horse geneticist
- Eric Hill (1927–2014), English children's book author and illustrator
- Eric Hill (American football) (born 1966), American football player
- Eric Hill (cricketer) (1923–2010), English cricketer and journalist
- Eric J. Hill, American architect
- Eric T. Hill, US Air Force SOC deputy commander
- Erica Hill (born 1976), American journalist
- Erin Hill, American actress and musician
- Ernest Hill (author) (1915–2003), British writer
- Ernest Hill (musician) (1900–1964), American jazz musician
- Ernestine Hill (1899–1972), Australian journalist, travel writer and novelist
- Errol Hill (1921–2003), Trinidadian playwright, historian
- Esther Hill (1895–1985), Canadian architect and artist
- Ethel Hill (1898–1954), American screenwriter and race horse owner
- Eustace Hill (1869–1933), Welsh cricketer
- Eva Hill (1898–1981), New Zealand doctor
- Evan Hill (1919–2010), American journalist & academic
- Eveline Hill (1898–1973), British catering business manager and Conservative Party politician
- Evelyn Hill (cricketer) (1907–1953), English cricketer

== F ==
- F. Marguerite Hill (1919–2012), Canadian physician
- Faith Hill (born 1967), American singer
- Felicity Hill (1915–2019), British military personnel
- Finch Hill, British 19th century architect
- Fiona Hill (British political adviser) (born 1973), British Conservative political adviser
- Fiona Hill (presidential advisor) (born 1965), American foreign policy adviser
- Fitz Hill (born 1964), American college football player and coach, college administrator
- Frances M. Hill (1799–1884), American missionary and educator
- Francis Hill (1899–1980), British solicitor and historian
- Francis Hill (cricketer) (1862–1935), English cricketer
- Frank Ackerman Hill (1919–2012), American World War II pilot
- Frank E. Hill (Medal of Honor) (1850–1906), United States Army soldier
- Frank Ebenezer Hill (1880–1932), United States Navy Medal of Honor recipient
- Frank Hill (1906–1993), Scottish footballer and manager
- Frank Hill (rugby union) (1866–1927), Wales international rugby union player
- Frank Hill (Australian politician) (1883–1945), Australian politician
- Frank Hill (American politician) (born 1954), American politician
- Frank Pierce Hill (1855–1941), American librarian
- Fred Hill (American football) (born 1943), American football player
- Fred Hill (footballer, born 1940) (1940–2021), English footballer
- Fred Hill (coach) (1934–2019), American football and baseball coach
- Fred Hill (basketball) (born 1959), American basketball player
- Freddie Hill (footballer, born 1914), Welsh footballer
- Frederic William Hill (1866–1947), Canadian lawyer and military officer
- Frederick William Hill (1889–1959), British Military officer
- French Hill (politician) (born 1956), American politician

== G ==
- G. Kathleen Hill (born 1964), American diplomat
- Garrett Hill (born 1996), American baseball player
- Garry Hill (born 1958), English football manager
- Garry Hill (baseball) (1946–2017), American baseball player
- Gary Hill (born 1951), American artist
- Gary Hill (basketball) (1941–2009), American basketball player
- Gavin Hill (born 1965), NZ international rugby footballer
- Geoff Hill (Northern Ireland journalist) (born 1956), Author, journalist and motorcycle rider
- Geoffrey Hill (1932–2016), English poet
- Geoffrey T. R. Hill (1895–1955), British aeronautical engineer
- George Birkbeck Hill (1835–1903), British writer
- George F. Hill (1832–1910), Canadian politician
- George Francis Hill (1867–1948), British numismatist
- George Heywood Hill (1906–1986), British bookseller
- George Hill (director) (1895–1934), American film director and cinematographer
- George Hill (runner) (1891–1944), New Zealand long-distance runner
- George Hill (figure skater) (1907–1992), American figure skater
- George Hill (basketball) (born 1986), American basketball player
- George Hill (sprinter) (1901–1992), American sprinter
- George Hill (American football) (1933–2020), American football coach
- George Hill (Idaho politician) (1868–1958), American politician
- George Hill (minister) (1750–1819), Scottish minister
- George Hill (footballer) (1921–2002), Scottish footballer and manager
- George Hill (Maine politician) (1903–1980), American politician
- George Hill (cricketer) (born 2001), English cricketer
- George Hill (Medal of Honor) (born c. 1844), US Navy sailor Medal of Honor recipient
- George Hill (intelligence officer) (1892–1968), British intelligence officer
- George Hill (Australian politician) (1802–1883), Australian politician
- George Hill (agronomist) (1938–2017), New Zealand agronomist
- George Hill (ice hockey) (born 1941), Canadian ice hockey player
- George R. Hill (1884–1971), American educator
- George R. Hill III (1921–2001), American chemist and religious leader
- George Rowland Hill (1855-1928), English football official
- George Roy Hill (1921–2002), American film director
- George Snow Hill (1898–1969), American painter and sculptor
- George Washington Hill (1884–1946), American businessman
- George Watts Hill (1901–1993), American banker and philanthropist
- George William Hill (1838–1914), American mathematical astronomer
- George William Hill (sculptor) (1862–1934), Canadian sculptor
- Georgiana Hill (cookery book writer) (1825–1903), English cookery writer
- Georgiana Hill (1858–1924), British historian and women's rights activist
- Gerry Hill (1913–2006), English cricketer
- Gil Hill (1931–2016), American politician, police detective and actor
- Giles Hill, British Army general
- Gladwin Hill (1914–1992), American journalist
- Gladys Hill (1916–1981), American screenwriter
- Glenallen Hill (born 1965), American baseball player and coach
- Goldie Hill (1933–2005), American country music singer-songwriter
- Gordon Hill (footballer) (born 1954), English footballer and manager
- Gordon Hill (referee) (1928–2019), English football referee
- Gordon Hill (politician) (born 1951), Australian politician
- Grace Livingston Hill (1865–1947), American novelist
- Graham Hill (1929–1975), British racing driver
- Graham Hill (academic), Zimbabwean veterinary surgeon and academic
- Graham Hill (theologian) (born 1969), Australian theologian
- Graham Hill (judge), Australian judge
- Grant Hill (born 1972), American basketball executive and former player
- Grant Hill (politician) (born 1943), Canadian politician
- Grant Hill (producer), Australian film producer
- Greg A. Hill (artist) (born 1967), Canadian-born First Nations artist and curator
- Greg Hill (running back) (born 1972), American football player
- Greg Hill (cornerback) (born 1961), American football player
- Greg Hill (cricketer) (born 1972), English cricketer
- Greg Hill (poet) (born 1949), Welsh editor and poet
- Gregg Hill (born 1977), American tennis player
- Gus Hill (1858–1937), American vaudeville performer

== H ==
- Hainer Hill (1913–2001), German scenic designer
- Hamnett Pinhey Hill (1876–1942), Canadian politician
- Harlon Hill (1932–2013), American football player
- Harry Hill (born 1964), English comedian
- Harry Hill (cyclist) (1916–2009), English racing cyclist
- Harry Hill (sportsman) (1827–1896), British boxer
- Harry W. Hill (admiral) (1890–1971), United States admiral
- Harvie Hill, English rugby league footballer
- Hazel Hill (1921–2010), Computer, physician and psychiatrist
- Heather Hill (politician) (born 1960), Australian politician
- Heather Hill (director) (1939 or 1940 – 2025), American television director
- Helen Hill (1970–2007), American animator, filmmaker and social activist
- Henrietta Hill (born 1973), British High Court Judge
- Henry Aaron Hill (1915–1979), American chemist
- Henry Erskine Hill (1864–1939), Scottish priest and author
- Henry Hill (1943–2012), American mobster
- Henry Hill (American football) (born 1948), American football player
- Henry Hill (Australian cricketer) (1878–1906), Australian cricketer
- Henry Hill (New Zealand cricketer) (1845–1924), New Zealand cricketer
- Henry Hill (American architect) (1913–1984), English-born American architect
- Henry Hill (educationalist) (1849–1933), New Zealand educationalist and politician
- Henry Hill (bishop) (1921–2006), Canadian bishop
- Henry Hill (politician) (1826–1910), Australian freight contractor and politician
- Henry Hill (Irish architect) (1806–1887), Irish architect
- Henry Hill (Royal Navy officer) (1775–1849), British naval officer
- Henry W. Hill (1853–1929), American politician
- Henry Worsley Hill (1799–1868), English sailor and administrator
- Herbert Hill (basketball) (born 1984), American basketball player
- Herbert Hill (labor director) (1924–2004), American civil rights activist
- Herbert Hill (baseball) (1891–1970), American baseball player
- Herbert Hill (footballer) (1887–1955), Australian rules footballer
- Herman Hill (1945–1970), American baseball player
- Holton Hill (born 1997), American football player
- Homer S. Hill (1919–1992), American Major general
- Howard Hill (1899–1975), American archer
- Hugh Hill (baseball) (1879–1958), American baseball player
- Hugh Lawson White Hill (1810–1892), American politician
- Hunter Hill (baseball) (1879-1959), American baseball player
- Hunter Hill (politician) (born 1977), American politician

== I ==
- Ian Hill (born 1952), English bassist, member of Judas Priest
- Ian Hill (cardiologist) (1904–1982), Scottish physician
- Ian Hill (diplomat), New Zealand diplomat
- Ida Hill (1875–1954), American archaeologist
- Ike Hill (born 1947), American football player
- Irie Hill (born 1969), English pole vaulter
- Irving Hill (1915–1998), American judge
- Isaac Hill (1789–1851), American politician
- Ivan Hill (born 1961), American serial killer

== J ==
- J. D. Hill (born 1948), American football player
- J. Hill, American music arranger
- J. Lister Hill (1894–1984), American politician
- J. Tomilson Hill (born 1940), American hedge fund manager
- Jack Hill (born 1933), American filmmaker
- Jack Hill (footballer, born 1897) (1897–1972), English footballer and manager
- Jack Hill (gridiron football) (1932–2005), American gridiron football player
- Jack Hill (cricketer) (1923–1974), Australian cricketer
- Jack Hill (actor) (1887–1963), American actor
- Jack Hill (politician) (1944–2020), American politician
- Jack W. Hill (1928–1987), United States Marine
- Jackson Hill (composer) (born 1941), American composer
- Jaclyn Hill (born 1990), American internet personality
- Jacqueline Hill (1929–1993), English actress
- Jaden Hill (born 1999), American baseball player
- Jahquil Hill (born 1997), Bermudian association football player
- Jaime Hill (born 1963), American football coach
- Jake Hill (racing driver) (born 1994), British racing driver
- Jamahal Hill (born 1991), American mixed martial artist
- Jamal Hill (swimmer) (born 1995), American Paralympic swimmer
- James A. Hill (1923–2010), United States Air Force general
- James B. Hill (1856–1945), American inventor
- James Clinkscales Hill (1924–2017), American judge
- James DeWitt Hill (1882–1927), American air mail pilot
- James E. Hill (1921–1999), United States Air Force general
- James Enoch Hill (1929–2018), American sport shooter
- James G. Hill (1841–1913), American architect
- James Hill (rower) (1930–2020), New Zealand rower
- James Hill (British director) (1919–1994), British filmmaker
- James Hill (TV personality) (born 1987), English television personality
- James Hill (footballer, born 2002) (born 2002), English footballer
- James Hill (American film producer) (1916–2001), American film producer
- James Hill (British Army officer) (1911–2006), British Army officer
- James Hill (Mississippi politician) (c.1838–1903), American politician
- James Hill (Conservative politician) (1926–1999), British Labour politician
- James Hill (Canadian musician) (born 1980), Canadian ukulele musician
- James Hill (folk musician) (1811–1853), British folk musician
- James Hill (Labour politician) (1899–1966), Scottish Labour politician
- James Hill (American football) (born 1974), American football player
- James Hill (surgeon) (1703–1776), Scottish surgeon
- James Hill (Wisconsin state legislator) (1825–1897), American politician
- James J. Hill (1838–1916), American railroad promoter and financier
- James John Hill (1811–1882), English painter
- James L. Hill (1834–1888), American politician
- James M. Hill (1899–1962), Roman Catholic bishop
- James Peter Hill (1873–1954), Scottish embryologist
- James T. Hill (born 1946), US Army general
- James T. Hill Jr. (1892–1978), American lawyer
- Jamie Hill (rugby union) (born 1999), Welsh rugby union player
- Jamie Hill (born 1981), New Zealand international lawn and indoor bowler
- Jane H. Hill (1939–2018), American linguist
- Jane Hill (born 1969), British newsreader
- Jane Hill (politician) (1936–2015), Australian politician
- Jason Hill (singer), American musician
- Jason Hill (American football) (born 1985), American football player
- Jason Hill (golfer) (born 1971), American professional golfer
- Jay Hill (politician) (born 1952), Canadian politician
- Jay Hill (American football) (born 1975), American football player and coach
- Jean Hill (1931–2000), Eyewitness to President John F. Kennedy's assassination
- Jean Hill (actress) (1946–2013), American model and actress
- Jean Hill (swimmer) (born 1964), British swimmer
- Jeff Hill (born 1972), American football player
- Jemele Hill (born 1975), American sports journalist
- Jenna Miscavige Hill (born 1984), American author and critic of Scientology
- Jennifer Hill (born 1969), American statistician
- Jenny Hill (music hall performer) (1848–1896), English music hall performer
- Jenny Hill (politician), Australian politician
- Jenny Hill (journalist), Jersey journalist
- Jeremiah Hill (basketball) (born 1995), American basketball player
- Jeremy Hill (born 1992), American football player
- Jeremy Hill (baseball) (born 1977), American baseball player
- Jerome Hill (1905–1972), American film director
- Jerry Hill (racing driver) (born 1961), American racing driver
- Jerry Hill (politician) (born 1947), American politician
- Jess Hill (1907–1993), American baseball player
- Jess Hill (writer), Australian investigative journalist
- Jesse Hill (1927–2012), African American civil rights activist
- Jessie Hill (1932–1996), American musical artist
- Jessie Hill (director), Australian music video director and fashion designer
- Jim Hill (broadcaster) (born 1946), American football player and sportscaster
- Jim Hill (Alabama politician) (born 1950), Alabama politician
- Jim Hill (Oregon politician) (born 1947), American politician
- Jim Hill (racing driver) (1888–1962), American racing driver
- Jimmy Hill (footballer, born 1935), Northern Irish footballer and manager
- Jimmy Hill (1928–2015), English association football personality
- Jimmy Hill (American football) (born 1928), American football player
- Jimmy Hill (broadcaster, born 1989), British TV presenter and YouTuber
- Jimmy Hill (Scottish footballer) (born 1872), Scottish footballer
- Jo Hill (born 1973), Australian basketball player
- Joan Hill (1930–2020), Native American artist
- Joan Robinson Hill (1931–1969), American socialite and equestrian
- Jody Hill (born 1976), American director and screenwriter
- Joe Hill (activist) (1879–1915), Swedish-American labor activist
- Joe Hill (writer) (born 1972), American author
- Johannes Hill (born 1989), German opera singer
- John A. Hill (1858–1916), American engineer, publisher and businessman
- John Cathles Hill (1857–1915), British architect
- John Christopher Columbus Hill (1828–1904), American engineer
- John deKoven Hill (1920–1996), American architect
- John Edward Gray Hill (1839–1914), British solicitor and travel writer
- John Edwards Hill (1928–1997), English zoologist
- John Ethan Hill (1865–1941), American football coach and mathematician
- John Fremont Hill (1855–1912), American politician, Maine
- John G. Hill Jr. (1926–1999), American army officer
- John H. Hill (1852–1936), African-American school administrator
- John Hamar Hill (1912–1998), British Royal Air Force officer
- John Hill (botanist) (1716–1775), English author and botanist
- John Hill (wrestler) (1941–2010), Canadian professional wrestler
- John Hill (musician), American guitarist
- John Hill (American football) (1950–2018), American football player
- John Hill (New Jersey politician) (1821–1884), American politician
- John Hill (Texas politician) (1923–2007), American judge
- John Hill (New Zealand footballer) (born 1949), New Zealand footballer
- John Hill (Australian politician) (born 1949), Australian politician
- John Hill (Virginia politician) (1800–1880), U.S. Representative from Virginia
- John Hill (explorer) (c. 1810–1860), English explorer of South Australia
- John Hill (British politician) (1912–2007), Barrister, farmer, and British Conservative Party politician
- John Hill (North Carolina politician) (1797–1861), American politician
- John Hill (British Army officer, died 1735), 17/18th-century British army officer
- John Hill (screenwriter) (2000–2017), American screenwriter and film director
- John Hill (trade unionist) (1863–1945), British trade union leader
- John Hill (Australian businessman) (1847–1926), South Australian businessman
- John Hill (actor) (born 1978), American musical theater actor
- John Hill (police officer) (1914–2004), British police officer
- John Hill (bishop) (1862–1943), British Anglican bishop
- John Hill (ice hockey) (born 1960), American ice hockey coach
- John Hill (died 1408), Member of the Parliament of England
- John Hill (classicist) (1747–1805), Scottish minister and classicist
- John Hill (conductor) (1843–1876), Australian organist, and choirmaster
- John Hill (planter) (1824–1910), American industrialist
- John Hill (Royal Navy officer) (1774–1855), Royal Navy officer
- John Hill (English cricketer) (1867–1963), English cricketer
- John Hill (New Zealand cricketer) (1930–2002), New Zealand cricketer
- John J. Hill (1853–1932), American stonemason
- John McGregor Hill (1921–2008), British nuclear physicist
- John Philip Hill (1879–1941), American politician
- John Sprunt Hill (1869–1961), American private banker and politician
- John Stephen Hill (born 1953), Canadian actor
- John Thomas Hill (1811–1902), British Army general
- John W. Hill (1890–1977), American public relations executive
- John Wesley Hill (1863–1936), American minister, activist, and author
- John William Hill (1812–1879), British-American painter
- John Y. Hill (1799–1859), American politician
- Johnny Hill (1905–1929), Scottish boxer
- Johnny Hill (footballer) (1884–?), Scottish footballer
- Jon Hill (chef) (born 1954), American chef
- Jon Michael Hill (born 1985), American actor
- Jonah Hill (born 1983), American actor
- Jonathan Hill (presenter), Welsh television presenter
- Jonathan Hill (cricketer) (born 1990), Filipino-Australian cricketer
- Jonny Hill (rugby union) (born 1994), England international rugby union player
- Jordan Hill (basketball) (born 1987), American basketball player
- Jordan Hill (American football) (born 1991), American football player
- Jordan Hill (singer) (born 1978), American singer-songwriter
- José Roberto Hill (1945–2005), Mexican actor
- Joseph Adna Hill (1860–1938), American statistician
- Joseph H. Hill (1858–1927), American educator
- Joseph Hill (musician) (1949–2006), Jamaican singer and songwriter
- Joseph Hill (lexicographer) (1625–1707), English academic and nonconformist clergyman
- Joseph M. Hill (1864–1950), American judge
- Josephine Hill (1899–1989), American actress
- Josh Hill (footballer) (born 1989), Australian rules footballer
- Josh Hill (racing driver) (born 1991), British racing driver
- Josh Hill (American football) (born 1990), American football player
- Josh Hill (rugby union) (born 1999), New Zealand rugby union player
- Josh Hill (fighter) (born 1986), Canadian mixed martial artist
- Joshua Hill (politician) (1812–1891), American politician
- Joshua Hill (Pitcairn Island leader) (1773–1844), Pitcairn Island politician
- Joshua Hill (baseball) (born 1983), Australian professional baseball pitcher
- Jovan Hill (born 1992 or 1993), American livestreamer
- Joyce Hill (1925–2021), American baseball player
- Jude Hill (born 2010), Northern Irish child actor
- Judith Hill (born 1984), American singer-songwriter
- Judson Hill (born 1959), American politician
- Julia Butterfly Hill (born 1974), American environmental activist
- Julian Hill (politician) (born 1973), Australian politician
- Julian W. Hill (1904–1996), American chemist
- Julien Hill (1877–1943), American football coach and banker
- Justice Hill (born 1997), American football player
- Justin Hill (politician), American businessman and politician
- Justin Hill (baseball), American college baseball coach
- Justin Hill (writer) (born 1971), English novelist
- Justly Hill (1781–1853), English anglican priest

== K ==
- K. J. Hill (born 1997), American football player
- Kacy Hill (born 1994), American singer-songwriter and model
- Kahlil Hill (born 1979), American gridiron football player
- Kamani Hill (born 1985), American soccer player
- Karen Friedman Hill (born 1946), Wife of mobster Henry Hill
- Karl Hill (1831–1893), German opera singer
- Kasey Hill (born 1993), American basketball player
- Kasim Hill (born 1997), American football player
- Kathryn Hill (born 1994), Scottish footballer
- Katie Hill (born 1987), American politician
- Katie Rain Hill (born 1994), American transgender activist and author
- Katy Hill (born 1971), British television presenter
- Keith Hill (politician) (born 1943), British politician
- Keith Hill (footballer) (born 1969), English footballer and manager
- Kelli Hill (born 1960), American retired gymnast and coach
- Ken Hill (baseball) (born 1965), American baseball player
- Ken Hill (botanist) (1948–2010), Australian botanist
- Ken Hill (playwright) (1937–1995), English playwright and theatre director
- Ken Hill (motorcyclist) (born 1964), American motorcycle racer
- Kenny Hill (defensive back) (born 1958), American football player
- Kenny Hill (quarterback) (born 1994), American football player and coach
- Kenny Hill (English footballer) (born 1953), English footballer
- Kent Hill (born 1957), American football player
- Kent R. Hill, American academic administrator
- Kerrica Hill (born 2005), Jamaican athlete
- Kerry Hill (1943–2018), Australian architect
- Kevin Hill (footballer) (born 1976), English footballer and manager
- Kevin Hill (snowboarder) (born 1986), Canadian snowboarder
- Kim Hill (soul singer) (born 1970), American soul musician
- Kim Hill (Christian singer) (born 1963), American singer-songwriter
- Kim Hill (broadcaster) (born 1955), New Zealand broadcaster
- Kimberly Hill (born 1989), American volleyball player
- King Hill (1936–2012), American football player
- King Solomon Hill (1897–1949), Delta blues guitarist and singer
- Koyie Hill (born 1979), American baseball player
- Kristofer Hill (born 1979), American singer-songwriter
- Kristy Hill (born 1979), New Zealand footballer
- Kyle Hill (born 1979), American basketball player
- Kylin Hill (born 1998), American football player

== L ==
- Lady Anne Hill (1911–2006), British bookseller and writer
- Lady Arthur Hill (1848–1944), English composer
- Lano Hill (born 1995), American football player
- Laura Hill (squash player) (born 1976), English squash player
- Lauren Michelle Hill (born 1979), American model and actress
- Laurie Hill (footballer, born 1942) (1942–2014), Australian rules footballer
- Laurie Hill (footballer, born 1970), American-born Mexican retired footballer
- Lauryn Hill (born 1975), American rapper and singer
- Lavert Hill (born 1998), American football player
- Lawrence Hill (born 1957), Canadian novelist, essayist, and memoirist
- Ledger Hill (1871–1950), English cricketer
- Lee Hill (actor) (1894–1957), American actor
- Len Hill (1941–2007), Welsh sportsman
- Len Hill (footballer) (1899–1979), English footballer
- Leonard Hill (physiologist) (1866–1952), British physiologist
- Leonard Hill (producer) (1947–2016), Television producer
- Leonard Hill (politician) (1886–1963), Australian politician
- Leroy Hill (born 1982), American football player
- Les Hill (born 1973), Australian actor
- Les Hill (cricketer) (1884–1952), Australian cricketer
- Leslee Hill, American Republican politician
- Leslie Hill, British academic
- Leslie Pinckney Hill (1880–1960), American educator, writer and community leader
- Lester S. Hill (1891–1961), American mathematician
- Levi Hill (1816–1865), American minister and photographer
- Lew Hill (basketball) (1965–2021), American basketball coach
- Lewis Hill (Pacifica Radio) (1919–1957), American public radio personality
- Lewis Hill (cricketer, born 1990), English cricketer
- Lillie Rosa Minoka Hill (1876–1952), American physician
- Lionel Hill (1881–1963), Australian politician
- Lisa Hill (political scientist) (born 1961), Australian political scientist
- Lisa Katharina Hill (born 1992), German artistic gymnast
- Liv Hill (born 2000), British actress
- Lloyd Hill (American football) (born 1972), American football player
- Lonzell Hill (born 1965), American gridiron football player
- Lord Arthur Hill (1846–1931), Anglo-Irish soldier and Conservative politician
- Lord George Hill (1801–1879), British Army officer and MP
- Lorna Hill (1902–1991), English author
- Lorraine Hill (born 1946), Australian cricketer
- Lou Hill (born 1944), Australian politician
- Louis G. Hill (1924–2013), American politician
- Louis W. Hill (1872–1948), American railroad executive
- Louisa Hill (born 1962), New Zealand equestrian
- Louise Sneed Hill (1862–1955), Socialite in Denver, Colorado
- Lovette Hill (1907–1989), American football and baseball coach
- Lucienne Hill (1923–2012), French-English translator and actress
- Luzene Hill (born 1946), Native American multimedia and installation artist
- Lyda Hill (born 1942), American investor and philanthropist
- Lydia Cecilia Hill (1913–1940), British dancer
- Lynn Hill (born 1961), American rock climber

== M ==
- Mabel Hill (1872–1956), New Zealand painter
- Mac Hill (1925–1995), Australian rules footballer
- Mack Lee Hill (1940–1965), American football player
- Maddy Hill (born 1990), English actress
- Madre Hill (born 1976), American football player and coach
- Maggie Hill (1898–1949), British mobster
- Maja Hill (born 1976), Macedonian artist
- Malcolm Hill (footballer) (1938–2024), Australian rules footballer
- Malcolm Hill (basketball) (born 1995), American basketball player
- Marc Hill (1952–2025), American baseball player
- Marc Lamont Hill (born 1978), American academic, writer and activist
- Margaret Hill (social reformer) (1885–1970), British social reformer
- Margaret Hunt Hill (1915–2007), American philanthropist and heiress
- Marianna Hill (born 1942), American actress
- Mariko Hill (born 1995), Hong Kong cricketer
- Marjorie Hill (1886–1909), American educator and sorority founder
- Mark Hill (musician) (born 1972), Welsh musician, songwriter and record producer
- Mark Hill (Scottish footballer) (born 1998), Scottish footballer
- Mark Hill (cricketer) (born 1964), Australian cricketer
- Mark Hill (antiques expert) (born 1975), British antiques expert
- Mark Langdon Hill (1772–1842), American politician
- Marquis Hill (born 1987), American jazz trumpeter
- Marquise Hill (1982–2007), American football player
- Martha Hill (1900–1995), American dance instructor
- Martha Hill (skier) (born 1960), American para-alpine skier
- Martha N. Hill (born 1943), American nurse
- Martin Hill (visual effects artist), Special effects artist
- Martina Hill (born 1974), German actress and comedian
- Martyn Hill (born 1944), British operatic tenor
- Marvin S. Hill (1928–2016), American historian
- Mary C. Hill, American hydrologist
- Mary Elliott Hill (1907–1969), American chemist
- Mary Lynne Gasaway Hill (born 1964), American poet, writer and professor
- Matt Hill (born 1968), Canadian actor
- Matt Hill (English footballer) (born 1981), English footballer
- Matt Hill (golfer) (born 1988), Canadian professional golfer
- Matt Hill (American football) (born 1978), American football player
- Matt Hill (businessman) (born 1970), Australian businessman
- Matt Hill (musician) (born 1985), American singer
- Matthew Davenport Hill (1792–1872), English lawyer, prison reform campaigner and MP
- Matthew Hill (born 1978), American politician
- Matthew W. Hill (1894–1989), American judge
- Maurice Hill (geophysicist) (1919–1966), British marine geophysicist
- Maurice Hill (cricketer) (born 1935), English cricketer
- Mauriq Hill (born 1995), Bermudian footballer
- Max Hill (born 1963), British barrister
- Mel Hill (1914–1996), Canadian ice hockey player
- Melanie Hill (born 1962), English actress
- Melinda Hill (born 1972), American comedian and actress
- Melissa Hill (born 1970), American pornographic film actress
- Mervyn Hill (1902–1948), British cricketer
- Micaiah John Muller Hill (1856–1929), English mathematician
- Michael Hill (tennis) (born 1974), Australian tennis player
- Michael Hill (activist) (born 1951), American political activist
- Michael Hill (baseball) (born 1971), Baseball executive
- Michael Hill (jeweller) (1938–2025), New Zealand businessman
- Michael Hill (cricketer, born 1988) (born 1988), Australian cricketer
- Michael Hill (1672–1699), English politician
- Michael Hill (American football) (born 1989), American football player
- Michael Hill (diplomat), British diplomat
- Michael Hill (English cricketer) (born 1951), English cricketer
- Mick Hill (javelin thrower) (born 1964), English javelin thrower
- Mick Hill (pool player), English pool player
- Mick Hill (footballer) (1947–2008), English-born Welsh footballer
- Mike Hill (film editor) (1949–2023), American film editor
- Mike Hill (sportscaster) (born 1972), American television sportscaster and sports journalist
- Mike Hill (golfer) (1939–2025), American professional golfer
- Mike Hill (bishop) (born 1949), English Anglican bishop
- Mike Hill (British politician) (born 1963), British politician
- Mike Hill (American politician) (born 1958), American politician
- Mike Hill (athletic director) (born 1968), American university sports administrator
- Mildred J. Hill (1859–1916), Composer of the melody of "Happy Birthday to You"
- Milt Hill (born 1965), American baseball player
- Mimi Hill (born 2002), Australian rules footballer
- Minnie Mossman Hill (1863–1946), American steamboat captain
- Miranda Hill (1836–1910), English social reformer
- Mirrie Hill (1889–1986), Australian composer
- Mitch Hill, American college baseball coach
- Monroe Palmer, Baron Palmer of Childs Hill (born 1938), British politician
- Morton A. Hill (1917–1985), American anti-pornography campaigner
- Moyses Hill (died 1630), English knight and army officer
- Mr. Hill (born 1973), American hip hop record producer and DJ
- Murray Hill (performer) (born c. 1971), American comedian
- Murray Hill (politician) (1923–2003), Australian politician

== N ==
- Nancy M. Hill (1833–1919), American Civil War nurse
- Napoleon Hill (1883–1970), American author
- Narelle Hill (born 1969), Australian judoka
- Nate Hill (American football) (1966–2007), American football player
- Nate Hill (artist) (born 1977), American artist
- Nathan Hill (writer) (born 1975), American fiction writer
- Nathan W. Hill (born 1979), American historical linguist
- Nathaniel Hill (artist) (1861–1930), Irish artist
- Nathaniel P. Hill (1832–1900), American mining executive, academic, and politician
- Ned C. Hill (born 1945), American academic
- Nic Hill (born 1981), American film director
- Nicholas Hill (scientist) (1570 – c. 1610), English natural philosopher
- Nicholas Hill (priest) (fl. 1428–1457), Irish Anglican priest
- Nick Hill (born 1985), American football player and coach
- Nick Hill (baseball) (born 1985), American professional baseball pitcher
- Noel Hill (musician) (born 1958), Irish concertina player
- Noel Hill (rugby league) (1927–2003), Australian rugby league footballer
- Norm Hill (1928–2020), Canadian football player
- Norman Hill (born 1933), American civil rights activist
- Norman Hill (cricketer) (1935–2023), English cricketer

== O ==
- Octavia Hill (1838–1912), English social reformer
- Oliver Hill (attorney) (1907–2007), American lawyer
- Oliver Hill (architect) (1887–1968), British architect
- Oliver Hill (baseball) (1909-1970), American baseball player
- Opal Hill (1892–1981), American professional golfer
- Otis Hill (born 1974), American basketball player
- Owen Hill (born 1982), Colorado politician

== P ==
- Pascoe Grenfell Hill (1804–1882), British writer
- Pat Hill (born 1951), American football player and coach
- Pati Hill (1921–2014), American writer and photocopy artist
- Patricia Hill, New Zealand Paralympian
- Patrick Seager Hill (1915–2010), British clothing manufacturer
- Patty Hill (1868–1946), American educator and songwriter
- Paul Hill (flight director) (born 1962), Former Director of Mission Operations at the NASA Lyndon B. Johnson Space Center
- Paul Hill (rugby union) (born 1995), England international rugby union footballer
- Paul Jennings Hill (1954–2003), American minister and anti-abortion terrorist
- Paul R. Hill (1909–1990), American aerodynamicist
- Pauline Hill (1926–2012), American baseball player
- Percival Hill (1868–1950), Australian cricketer
- Perry Hill (baseball) (born 1952), American baseball coach
- Pete Hill (1882–1951), Baseball player
- Peter Buckley Hill (born 1948), British comedian
- Peter Hill (pianist) (born 1948), British pianist and musicologist
- Peter Hill (journalist) (born 1945), British journalist
- Peter Hill (entrepreneur) (born 1964), Australian skateboarder and entrepreneur
- Peter Hill (Paralympian) (born 1957), Australian Paralympic swimmer and athlete
- Peter Hill (footballer) (1931–2015), English footballer
- Peter Hill (bishop) (born 1950), British Anglican bishop
- Peter Hill (civil servant), British civil servant and political advisor
- Ployer Peter Hill (1894–1935), USAF pilot and namegiver to Hill Air Force Base
- Phelan Hill (born 1979), British rower
- Phil Hill (1927–2008), American racing driver
- Phil Hill (ice hockey) (born 1982), Welsh ice hockey player
- Philip Carteret Hill (1821–1894), Premier of Nova Scotia from 1875 to 1878
- Phillip E. Hill Sr. (born 1956), American fraudster
- Phillip Hill (born 1972), American bass and guitar player
- Phyllis Hill (1920–1993), American actress
- Priscilla Capps Hill (1900–1985), American philanthropist

== Q ==
- Quadtrine Hill (born 1982), American football player

== R ==
- Raewyn Hill (born 1972), New Zealand choreographer and dancer
- Ralph Hill (representative) (1827–99), American lawyer and politician
- Ralph Hill (music critic) (1900–50), British music critic
- Ralph Hill (runner) (1908–94), American middle-distance runner
- Ralph Nading Hill (1917–87), American writer and preservationist
- Ralyn M. Hill (1899–1977), American Medal of Honor recipient
- Reg Hill (Reginald Eric Hill, 1914–1999), English model maker and television producer
- Reginald Hill (1936–2012), British crime novelist
- Rhonda P. Hill (born 1956), American fashion industry analyst
- Rich Hill (born 1980), American baseball player
- Rich Hill (baseball coach) (born 1962), American baseball coach
- Richard Hill (rugby union, born 1973), British Lions & England international rugby union player
- Richard Hill (rugby union, born 1961), England international rugby union player
- Richard Hill (Royal Navy officer) (1929–2017), English Royal Navy admiral
- Richard Hill (Pennsylvania politician) (1652–1729), American judge
- Richard Hill (runner) (born 1986), British former athlete
- Richard Hill (bishop) (1401–1496), 15th-century Bishop of London
- Richard Hill (composer) (1942–2026), British composer
- Richard Hill (cricketer, born 1861) (1861–1924), English cricketer
- Richard Hill (RAF officer) (1899–1918), British flying ace
- Richard Hill (footballer, born 1963), English footballer and manager
- Richard Hill (footballer, born 1893) (1893–1971), English footballer
- Richard Hill (priest) (1782-1836), Anglican priest
- Richard Hill (New South Wales politician) (1810–1895), Australian politician
- Richard Hill (Queensland politician) (1885–1959), Australian politician
- Richard Hill (activist) (1795–1872), Jamaican zoologist, botanist, ornithologist and politician
- Richard Leslie Hill (1901–1996), English civil servant and historian of Sudan
- Rick Hill (born 1946), American politician
- Ricki Hill (born 1960), Australian squash player
- Ricky Hill (born 1959), English footballer and manager
- Ricky Hill (politician), American politician
- Rico Hill (born 1977), American basketball player
- Riley Hill (actor) (1914–1993), American actor
- Rob Hill (field hockey) (born 1967), British field hockey player
- Rob Hill (producer), American record producer
- Robbie Hill (born 1954), New Zealand cricketer
- Robert A. Hill (historian) (born 1943), Jamaican historian and academic
- Robert Andrews Hill (1811–1900), American judge
- Robert C. Hill (1917–1978), American diplomat
- Robert Carnwath, Lord Carnwath of Notting Hill (born 1945), English judge
- Robert Chambre Hill (1778–1860), British Army cavalry officer
- Robert F. Hill (1886–1966), Canadian film director and screenwriter
- Robert Gardiner Hill (1811–1878), British surgeon
- Robert Hill (Australian politician) (born 1946), Australian politician
- Robert Hill (priest) (1550–1623), English clergyman
- Robert Hill (musician) (born 1953), American harpsichordist and fortepianist
- Robert Hill (coach) (1934–2016), American football and baseball coach
- Robert Hill (writer), American screenwriter and playwright
- Robert Jordan Hill, British film director, writer, editor and producer
- Robert L. Hill (biochemist) (1928–2012), biochemist, researcher, teacher
- Robert Lee Hill (1892–1963), American labor unionist
- Robert Madden Hill (1928–1987), American judge
- Robert P. Hill (1874–1937), American politician
- Robert T. Hill (1858–1941), American geologist
- Robert W. Hill (1828–1909), American architect
- Robin Hill (biochemist) (1899–1991), British plant biochemist
- Rocky Hill (musician) (1946–2009), American blues guitarist and singer
- Rod Hill (born 1959), American gridiron football player
- Roderic Hill (1894–1954), Royal Air Force Air Chief Marshal
- Rodney Hill (1921–2011), British mathematician
- Roger Hill (actor) (1948–2014), American actor
- Roger Hill (judge) (1605–1667), English judge and Member of Parliament
- Roger Hill (of Denham) (1642–1729), English landowner, courtier and Whig politician
- Roger P. Hill (1910-2001), Royal Navy officer
- Roland Hill (journalist) (1920–2014), British journalist and author
- Ron Hill (1938–2021), British long-distance runner
- Ronald Hill (rugby), Wales rugby league footballer and commentator
- Rosalind Hill (1908–1997), English historian
- Rosamond Davenport Hill (1825–1902), British educational administrator and prison reformer
- Rose Hill (actress) (1914–2003), English actress and operatic soprano
- Rose Hill (athlete) (born 1956), British wheelchair athlete
- Rosemary Hill (born 1957), English writer and historian
- Roslyn Hill, American community activist
- Rowland Clegg-Hill, 3rd Viscount Hill (1833–1895), British Conservative politician
- Rowland Hill (1795–1879), Devisor of the British postal system
- Rowland Hill (preacher) (1744-1833), English preacher and vaccination advocate
- Rowland Hill (MP) (c.1495–1561), Publisher of the Geneva Bible and Tudor Statesman
- Rowland Hill, 1st Viscount Hill (1772–1842), British Army officer and politician
- Rowland Hill, 2nd Viscount Hill (1800–1875), British politician
- Rowley Hill (bishop) (1836–1887), Anglican bishop of Sodor and Man
- Roy W. Hill (1899–1986), American businessman and philanthropist
- Ruth W. Hill (1898–1995), American numismatist

== S ==
- Sally Hill, New Zealand academic
- Sara B. Hill (1882–1963), American bookplate designer
- Scott Hill (rugby league) (born 1977), Australia international rugby league footballer
- Scotti Hill (born 1964), American guitarist
- Sean Hill (ice hockey) (born 1970), American ice hockey player
- Sean Hill (American football) (born 1971), American football player
- Sharon A. Hill (born 1970), American science writer and speaker
- Shaun Hill (born 1980), American football player
- Shawn Hill (born 1981), Canadian baseball pitcher
- Sidney Hill, British merchant and philanthropist
- Simone Hill, Belizean LGBTQ rights activist
- Stanley Hill (1885–1970), Australian cricketer
- Stephanie Hill (model) (born 1995), English actress and model
- Stephen Clancy Hill (1976-2010), American murderer and pornographic actor
- Stephen D. Hill, American judge
- Stephen Hill (broadcaster), American radio producer
- Stephen Hill (Australian footballer) (born 1990), Australian rules footballer
- Stephen Hill (American football) (born 1991), American football player
- Stephen Hill (footballer, born 1982), English footballer
- Stephen Hill (entrepreneur) (born 1962), Australian skateboarder
- Stephen Hill (academic) (1946–2023), British academic
- Stephen John Hill (1809–1891), British colonial statesmen
- Stephen P. Hill (1806–1884), American minister
- Steve Hill (evangelist) (1954–2014), American pastor
- Steve Hill (footballer) (1940–2010), English footballer
- Steve Hill (horse trainer), American horse trainer
- Steven Hill (1922–2016), American actor
- Steven Hill (basketball) (born 1985), American basketball player
- Steven Hill (baseball) (born 1985), American baseball player
- Steven Hill (author) (born 1958), American writer and political reformer
- Stewart Hill (born 1962), American gridiron football player
- Stuart "Captain Calamity" Hill (born c. 1943), British sailor and activist
- Stuart Hill (author) (born 1958), British author
- Sue Hill (born 1955), British healthcare scientist
- Susan Hill (born 1942), British author of fiction and non-fiction
- Sylvia Louise Hill, also known as Sylvia Williams (1936–1996), American museum director, curator, art historian, and scholar of African art

== T ==
- Terence Hill (born Mario Girotti in 1939), Italian actor
- Terry Hill (1972–2024), Australian rugby league player
- Thelma Hill (1906–1938), American actress
- Theodora Hill (born 1946), New Zealand Olympic gymnast
- Theodore Hill (Australian politician) (1855–1942), Australian politician
- Thomas E. Hill (politician), American politician
- Thomas E. Hill (academic) (born 1937), American professor of philosophy
- Thomas Hill (Unitarian) (1818–1891), American clergyman
- Thomas Hill (actor) (1927–2009), American actor
- Thomas Hill (American painter) (1829–1908), American landscape painter
- Thomas Hill (hurdler) (born 1949), American hurdler
- Thomas Hill (gardening author) (1528–1574), English astrologer, author and translator
- Thomas Hill (theologian) (died 1653), English Puritan divine
- Thomas Hill (basketball) (born 1971), American basketball player
- Thomas Hill (archdeacon) (died 1875), Archdeacon of Derby
- Thomas Hill (dean of Ossory) (born 1634), Anglican priest
- Thomas Hill (clarinetist), American clarinetist
- Thomas Hill (footballer, born 1901), English footballer
- Thomas Hill (footballer, born 2002), Welsh footballer
- Thomas Hill (Shrewsbury MP) (1693–1782), 18th century English elected official
- Thomas Noel Hill (1784–1832), British Army officer
- Thomas Rowley Hill (1816–1896), English politician
- Thomas Seymour Hill (1893–1977), Australian rules football administrator
- Thomas Wright Hill (1763–1851), English mathematician and schoolmaster
- Tigre Hill (born 1968), American filmmaker
- Tim Hill (filmmaker) (born 1973), American filmmaker
- Tim Hill (politician) (born 1936), American politician
- Tim Hill (basketball) (born 1976), American basketball player
- Tim Hill (baseball) (born 1990), American baseball player
- Timmy Hill (born 1993), American racing driver and team owner
- Timothy Hill (politician) (born 1981), American politician
- Tiny Hill (1906–1971), American big band leader
- Tiny Hill (rugby union) (1927–2019), New Zealand rugby union player
- Tobias Hill (1970–2023), British writer
- Tokey Hill (born 1958), American martial artist
- Tom Hill (judoka) (born 1974), Australian Olympic judoka
- Tommie Hill (born 1985), American gridiron football player
- Tommy Hill (born 1985), British motorcycle racer
- Tony Hill (wide receiver) (born 1956), American football player
- Tony Hill (umpire) (born 1951), New Zealand cricket umpire
- Tony Hill (politician) (born 1957), American politician
- Tony Hill (defensive end) (born 1968), American gridiron football player
- Tony Hill (boxer) (born 1986), British former professional boxer
- Trey Hill (born 2000), American football player
- Trysten Hill (born 1998), American football player
- Tyler Hill (racing driver) (born 1994), American NASCAR driver
- Tyreek Hill (born 1994), American football player

== V ==
- Vernon Hill (born 1945), American businessman
- Vernon Hill (sculptor) (1887–1972), British sculptor
- Vernon Hill (cricketer, born 1871) (1871–1932), Welsh cricketer
- Vince Hill (Vincent Hill, 1934–2023), English traditional pop music singer, songwriter and record producer
- Vince Hill (American football) (born 1985), American football player
- Viola Hill (1892–after 1940), suffragist and musician
- Virgil Hill (born 1964), American boxer

== W ==
- W. Douglas P. Hill (1884–1962), British Indologist
- W. J. Hill (1834–1888), Actor, singer and comedian
- Walter Hill (born 1942), American filmmaker
- Walter Hill (garden curator) (1819–1904), British/Australian botanist
- Walter Hill (British Army officer) (1877–1942), British military officer
- Walter Barnard Hill (1851–1905), American academic
- Walter Newell Hill (1881–1955), United States Marine Corps general
- Warren Hill (musician) (born 1966), Canadian jazz saxophonist
- Warren Hill (murderer) (1960–2015), American murderer
- Whitmell Hill (1743–1797), American politician
- Wilhelm Hill (1838–1902), German musician
- Will Hill (born 1990), American gridiron football player
- William "Red" Hill Sr. (1888–1942), Canadian daredevil and rescuer
- William Hill (colonial administrator), Proprietary Governor of the Province of Avalon in Newfoundland, now in Canada
- William Hill (Australian politician) (1866–1939), Australian politician
- William Hill (English architect) (1827–1889, English architect
- William Hill (New South Wales politician) (1838–1919), Australian politician
- William Hill (Irish architect) (1798–1844), Irish architect
- William C. Hill (1917–1998), American judge
- William Charles Osman Hill (1901–1975), British anthropologist and anatomist
- William D. Hill (1833–1906), American politician
- William Ebsworth Hill (1817–1895), London violin maker
- William Henry Hill (New York politician) (1876–1972), American politician
- William Henry Hill (North Carolina politician) (1767–1809), American politician
- William Henry Hill Sr (1837–1911), Irish architect
- William Lair Hill (1838–1924), American attorney, historian and newspaper editor
- William Lowell Hill (1855–1922), US Navy sailor and Medal of Honor recipient
- William Luther Hill (1873–1951), American politician
- William P. T. Hill (1895–1965), United States Marine Corps general
- William S. Hill (1886–1972), American politician
- William U. Hill (born 1948), American judge
- William Waldegrave, Baron Waldegrave of North Hill (born 1946), British politician
- Wilson S. Hill (1863–1921), American politician
- Wilton St Hill (1893–1957), Trinidadian cricketer
- Winfield Hill, American engineer
- Winston Hill (1941–2016), American football player
- Winston Hill (boxer) (born 1993), Fijian boxer

== X ==
- Xavier Hill (born 2001), American football player

== Y ==
- Yolanda Dechelle Hill (born 1968), American accountant, non-profit executive, and public official
- Yvonne Hill (born 1937), Australian sport shooter

== Z ==
- Z. Z. Hill (1935–1984), American blues singer
- Zach Hill (born 1979), American musician
- Zak Hill (born 1979), American football player and coach
- Zanzye H.A. Hill (1906–1935), American lawyer

== Fictional characters ==
- Augustus Hill, a character from Oz
- Hank Hill, the protagonist of King of the Hill
  - Bobby Hill, Hank's son
  - Peggy Hill, Hank's wife
  - Cotton Hill, Hank's father

== See also ==
- Hill (disambiguation)
- Hills (disambiguation)
- Hull (surname)
- General Hill (disambiguation)
- Justice Hill (disambiguation)
