= Francis Hill (disambiguation) =

Francis Hill (1899–1980) was a British solicitor and historian.

Francis Hill may also refer to:

- Francis Manning Hill (1809–1854), Canadian lawyer and politician
- Francis Hill (cricketer) (1862–c. 1935), English cricketer
- Francis William Clegg-Hill, 5th Viscount Hill (1866–1924), British peer

== See also ==
- Frank Hill (disambiguation)
- Hill (surname)
