= Frank Hill (disambiguation) =

Frank Hill (1906–1993) was a Scottish football player and manager.

Frank Hill may also refer to:

- Frank Hill (American politician) (born 1954), American politician in the state of California
- Frank Hill (Australian footballer) (1914–1976), Australian rules footballer
- Frank Hill (Australian politician) (1883–1945), Australian politician
- Frank Hill (Medal of Honor) (1864–?), American Medal of Honor recipient (Spanish–American War)
- Frank Hill (rugby union) (1866–1927), Welsh international rugby union player
- Frank Hill (scientist) (born 1951), American astrophysicist
- Frank Ackerman Hill (1919–2012), American military airman and WWII Fighter Ace
- Frank E. Hill (Medal of Honor) (1850–1906), American Medal of Honor recipient (American Indian Wars)
- Frank Ebenezer Hill (1880–1932), American peacetime Medal of Honor recipient
- Frank Harrison Hill (1830–1910), English journalist
- Frank Pierce Hill (1855–1941), American librarian
- Jules Strongbow (born 1962), American professional wrestler whose ringname was Chief Frank Hill

== See also ==
- Francis Hill (disambiguation)
- Hill (surname)
