= Sara Hill =

Sara Hill may refer to:

- Sara B. Hill (1882–1963), American bookplate designer
- Sara E. Hill, former attorney general of the Cherokee Nation

== See also ==
- Sarah Hill (disambiguation)
