= Ruth Hill =

Ruth Hill may refer to:

- Ruth Edmonds Hill, American scholar and oral historian
- Ruth W. Hill, American numismatist
