= Sarah Hill =

Sarah Hill may refer to:

- Sarah Boland (born 1995), Canadian curler
- Sarah Althea Hill (1850–1937), American socialite
- Sarah J. Hill (1909–1996), American astronomer
- Sarah Hill (comics) or Horridus, a superheroine in The Savage Dragon comics series

== See also ==
- Sara Hill (disambiguation)
