= Alfred and Rosy Skinner House =

Historic house in Utah, United States

- Formerly listed on the U.S. National Register of Historic Places
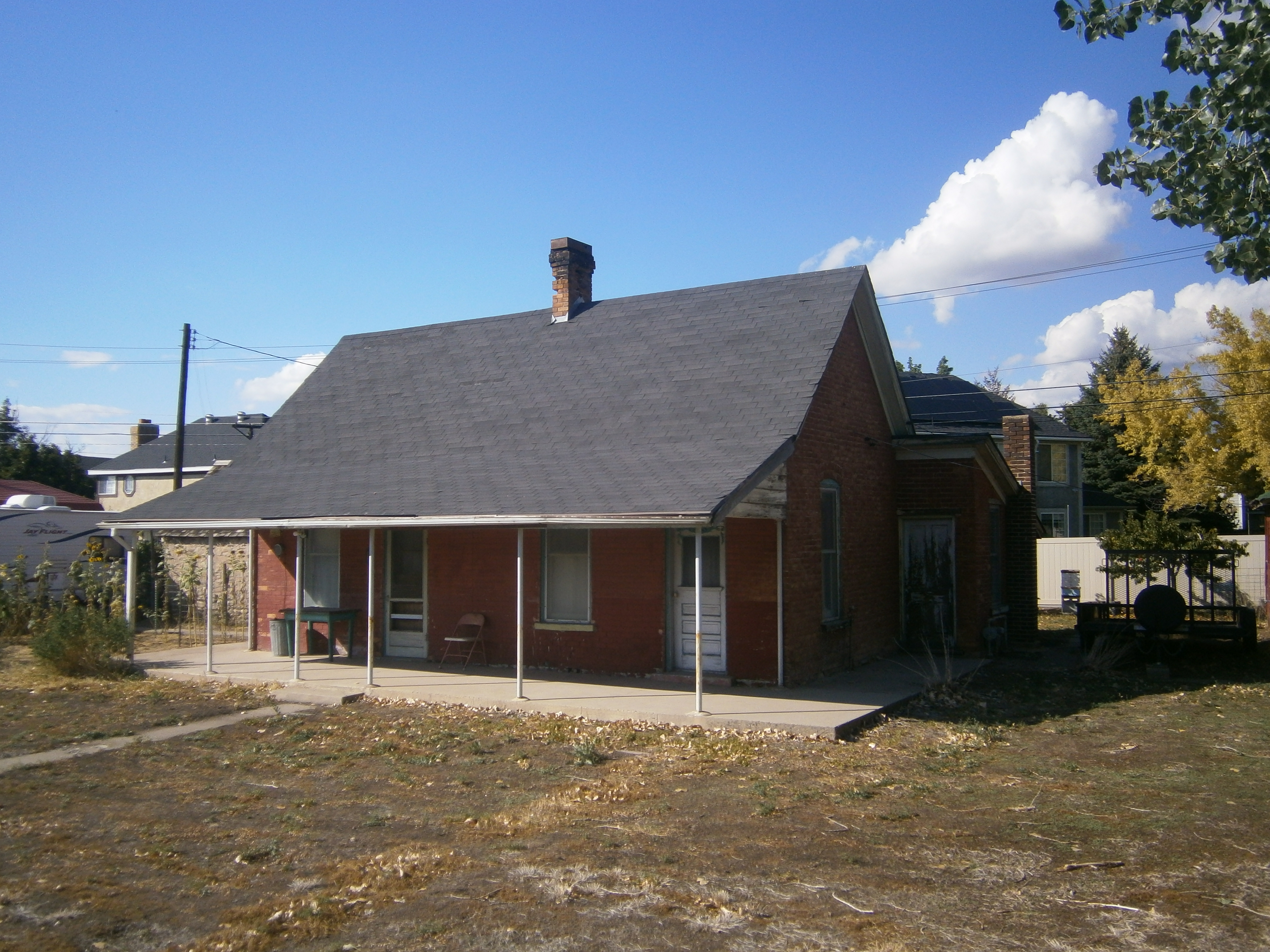

- Location within Utah Location within the United States
- Location: 232 W. 800 S., Orem, Utah
- Coordinates: 40°16′57″N 111°42′2″W
- Area: 0.4 acres (0.16 ha)
- Built: 1905
- Built by: Hill, John J.; et al.
- Architectural style: Classical Revival
- MPS: Orem, Utah MPS
- NRHP reference No.: 98000662

Significant dates
- Added to NRHP: June 11, 1998
- Removed from NRHP: October 10, 2023

The Alfred and Rosy Skinner House at 232 W. 800 S. in Orem, Utah, United States, was built in 1905. It was listed on the National Register of Historic Places in 1998, and was delisted in 2023.

It was a work of stonemason/builder John J. Hill.
