= Richard Hill (cricketer, born 1861) =

English cricketer

Personal information
- Full name: Richard Ernest Hill
- Born: 12 August 1861; Timsbury, Bath, Somerset, England
- Died: 25 December 1924 (aged 63); Westminster, Middlesex, England
- Batting: Right-handed
- Bowling: Left-arm fast

Domestic team information
- Years: Team
- 1882: Somerset

Career statistics
Competition	FC
Matches	1
Runs scored	7
Batting average	7.00
100s/50s	0/0
Top score	7*
Balls bowled	32
Wickets	1
Bowling average	21.00
5 wickets in innings	0
10 wickets in match	0
Best bowling	1/21
Catches/stumpings	0/–
- Source: CricketArchive (subscription required), 22 December 2015

Richard Hill (12 August 1861 — 25 December 1924) was an English cricketer. He was a right-handed batsman and left-arm fast bowler who played for Somerset. He was born in Timsbury and died in Westminster.

Hill made a single first-class appearance for the team during the 1882 season, against Gloucestershire. From the lower order, he scored a duck in the first innings in which he batted and 7 not out in the second, his first-innings wicket falling courtesy of W. G. Grace.

Hill bowled eight overs during the match, capturing one wicket, that of onetime Test player James Cranston.

Hill's brother, Francis, made a single first-class appearance for Somerset during the 1882 season.
