= Thomas Hill (footballer, born 1901) =

English footballer

Personal information
- Full name: Thomas Hill
- Date of birth: 1901
- Place of birth: Bradford, England
- Height: 5 ft 7 1/2 in (1.71 m)
- Position: Right half

Senior career*
| Years | Team | Apps | (Gls) |
| –1921 | Bolton United | | |
| 1921–1924 | Bradford City | 12 | (0) |
| 1924–1926 | Walsall | 15 | (0) |
| 1926–1928 | York City | 2 | (0) |
| Total | | 29 | (0) |
- * Club domestic league appearances and goals

Thomas Hill (born 1901) was an English professional footballer who played as a right half. He was also known as Tommy Hill and Tom Hill.

== Career ==
Born in Bradford, West Riding of Yorkshire, Hill signed for Bradford City in October 1921 after playing with Bolton United, leaving the club in July 1924 to sign for Walsall. During his time with Bradford City he made 12 appearances in the Football League. He went on to play 15 Football League matches for Walsall, before joining Midland League club York City in 1926. He made his debut in a 3–3 away draw with Long Eaton on 19 April 1927, with his second and final appearance coming almost a year later on 29 February 1928 in a 4–2 home win over Mexborough.
