= Francis Manning Hill =

Francis Manning Hill (1809 – January 1854) was a lawyer and politician in Canada West. He served as mayor of Kingston in 1849 and 1851.

Hill came to Upper Canada from England. He was called to the Upper Canada bar in 1845. His home Hillcroft, built in 1853 but not quite completed at the time of his death, later served as the residence of Alexander Campbell. He died at the age of 45, leaving behind a wife and four daughters.

A historical plaque placed by the province of Ontario stands in front of Hillcroft. The house was designed by architect William Coverdale.
