= E.V. Hill =

Pastor of Los Angeles mega-church (1933–2003)

- Born: Edward Victor Hill; November 10, 1933; Columbus, Texas, U.S.
- Died: February 24, 2003 (aged 69); Los Angeles, California, U.S.
- Occupation(s): Pastor, evangelist
- Years active: 1954–2003
- Spouses: Jane Edna Hill (m. 1955; died 1987) La Dean Hill (m. 1992)
- Children: 2, including E.V. Hill II

Edward Victor Hill Sr. (November 10, 1933 – February 24, 2003) was an American pastor. He was senior pastor at the Mount Zion Missionary Baptist Church in Los Angeles, California from 1961 until his death; under his leadership, it became one of the largest African-American congregations in the US. A prominent figure within the wider Baptist movement, he also served as co-chair of the Baptist World Alliance and was closely aligned with fellow evangelists such as Billy Graham.

== Biography ==
Hill was born in Columbus, Texas on November 10, 1933, the son of William and Rosa Hill. Despite being born into poverty, he managed to obtain a four-year scholarship to Prairie View A&M University near Houston to study Agronomy.

In 1954 he was called to pastor the Friendly Will Missionary Baptist Church in Austin and, subsequently, the Mount Corinth Baptist Church in Houston. While there he became a confidant of Martin Luther King Jr., whom he assisted in establishing the Southern Christian Leadership Conference. He also became active in social issues, lobbying for government programs to provide housing and other basic amenities to poor, often rural blacks.

In early 1961 he moved to Los Angeles to pastor the Mount Zion Missionary Baptist Church, which went on to become a hotspot of political and social activism in the city. Following the 1992 Los Angeles riots, President George H. W. Bush visited the church.

Hill increasingly aligned himself with Republican politics following his move to Los Angeles. He gave the inaugural prayer at Richard Nixon's second inauguration and later led clergy committees during the presidency of Ronald Reagan. His conservative politics put him at odds with many of the attendants at his services. He did, however, support Jesse Jackson's 1984 bid for the Democratic presidential nomination.

He was also active in Los Angeles politics, initially backing the mayoral campaign of Sam Yorty over that of black policeman Tom Bradley and chairing the city's Economic Opportunity Committee and Fire Commission during Yorty's administration. Later he served as a special volunteer advisor on South-Central Los Angeles under mayor Richard Riordan.

He was among the first African-American preachers to broadcast on the Trinity Broadcasting Network and enjoyed considerable influence among the Baptist movement. He variously served as leader of the California State Baptist Convention from 1972, associate professor of evangelism for the Billy Graham Evangelistic Association and was also a leading figure in the National Baptist Convention. In 1971 Graham invited him along with seven other black clergymen for a private discussion with then-President Nixon. Other evangelists with whom he aligned himself included Jim Bakker and Jimmy Swaggart, whom he supported during their respective sex scandals in the 1980s. He was also close friends with Jerry Falwell, who later attended his funeral. In 1998 he publicly defended the National Baptist Convention's embattled president Henry Lyons, who was ultimately forced to resign following charges of racketeering.

One of the most prominent African-American clergy of his time, Hill was opposed to the use of the term "black", stating that it was "theologically, philosophically and ophthalmologically unacceptable" and that he preferred the term "Negro".

In his later years Hill's health declined as a result of diabetes and other conditions. During his last year he had to deliver his sermons sitting down after losing the use of his legs. On February 8, 2003 he was admitted to the Cedars-Sinai Medical Center in Los Angeles with pneumonia, where he died on February 24 at the age of 69. His funeral, which took place at West Angeles Cathedral on March 8, was attended by around 4,000 people.

His son, E.V. Hill II, succeeded him as senior pastor of Mount Zion and continued in that function until his death on August 12, 2019.
