= William Hill (New South Wales politician) =

Australian politician

William Charles Hill (5 May 1838 – 11 January 1919) was an Australian politician.

He was born in Sydney to Richard Hill and Henrietta Cox, but grew up in rural areas. He was a partner in a woolbrokers' firm, and on 20 August 1874 married Alice Smith, with whom he had a daughter. He was a pastoralist and stock agent, and in 1900 was appointed to the New South Wales Legislative Council, where he served until his death at Woollahra in 1919.

== See also ==
- Political families of Australia: Wentworth/Hill/Griffiths/Scott/Cooper family
