= Jovan Hill =

American livestreamer (born 1992 or 1993)

- Born: Jovan Miguel Hill; 1992 or 1993 (age 32–33); Newport News, Virginia, U.S.
- Education: University of Baltimore (attended); Pace University (attended); Texas State University (attended)
- Years active: 2018–present

Jovan Miguel Hill (born 1992 or 1993) is an American internet personality and livestreamer. A homosexual man who was brought up in a religious household, Hill began a Tumblr blog as a teenager to document his experiences. After he asked his followers to donate so that his grandmother could pay off her bills, they sent him $3000. He dropped out of Texas State University and moved to Brooklyn, New York, in 2018, where he livestreamed and, unemployed, asked his followers to donate to pay rent. He moved to California in 2019.

Hill was a prolific Twitter user and had over 200,000 followers across his five active platforms in December 2018. Following the publication of Hill's profile in The New York Times, he received further attention and was criticized by several tabloids. He was nominated for Storyteller of the Year at the 11th Shorty Awards. After a string of repeated suspensions, he left Twitter for Instagram in 2019.

== Life and internet career ==
=== Early life ===
Jovan Miguel Hill was raised in Missouri City, Texas, alongside his eleven siblings, by a single mother who was a Jehovah's Witness. He is a homosexual, African-American man. Hill was active on online message boards and role-playing games such as MapleStory, where he would often troll other players. As he grew older, Hill blogged on Tumblr and documented his experience as a "gay high schooler in a religious household." According to Hill, he was diagnosed as bipolar but does not take any medication.

In 2016, after his grandmother's electricity was cut off due to unpaid bills, Hill panicked and asked his followers for $3000 to restore it. To his surprise, his followers sent him the full amount.

=== 2018: Moving to Crown Heights, Brooklyn ===
We basically came to an agreement where it was like, if you want me to be sitting in my room and going live every day, you need to pay my rent [...] At first that was like $300 to live in a basement, but then they wanted me to have a better life.

— Jovan Hill, The New York Times

Hill studied at Texas State University, but dropped out in January 2018 following a "manic episode" over a severe breakup, only several credits from graduating. With $22, Hill moved to a basement apartment in the neighborhood of Crown Heights, Brooklyn, with twenty-two year old fellow influencer Jake Garner, (Note: Garner is also known under his Twitter handle, @HuntyChan.) an acquaintance from Tumblr, to "start over." Without regular income, the pair began asking their online following to cover their rent. Hill was initially employed at a cinema concession stand, but quit after several weeks when he saw that he made more money streaming five times daily. He did not pick up his final paychecks. Hill is currently unemployed and only makes money from donations.

In December 2018, Hill had over 200,000 followers across his five platforms. He shared his apartment with several roommates. He then posted over thirty times a day on Twitter on his account @jovanhill, after his previous account, @ehjovan, was suspended after Hill feuded with K-pop fans.

=== 2019–2020: Twitter, Instagram ===
Throughout 2019, Hill's Twitter accounts were suspended repeatedly. In March, Hill's Twitter account @jovanmhill was suspended after he posted a fake photo of controversial beauty influencer James Charles using a racial slur in a direct message. When Charles threatened to sue him, Hill responded "let's do it baby, I know the law." He created a new account, @jovanforever, afterwards, with the purpose of "exposing" white internet personalities who have previously said discriminatory statements, such as Shane Dawson, David Dobrik and Tana Mongeau. In July, Hill said that he has been suspended nine times, including an account which was suspended forty-two minutes after its creation, with no response given. He added that several of his online acquaintances, including Garner and Kehlani, had contacted Twitter, to no avail.

In May, Hill had a guest appearance in the music video for the song "This Life" by Vampire Weekend. In a September interview for the Afropunk Festival, Hill said he had moved to California, video-called the singer Kehlani and discussed frustrations with his content being reshared online without his permission whilst dealing with student loan payments. He also mentioned that, although he was now active on Instagram, "I don’t think I’ll ever be back on Twitter how I was mid-2018."

== Content and platforms ==
Hill described his livestreams as a "gay, broke diary [...] like if a sloppy Tumblr blog and a 4chan thread had a mistake of a child." Besides asking for donations for his rent and cost of living, his videos depict him "ranting" and commentating on his life, mental health and pop culture, smoking marijuana, calling friends, hosting parties, and looking at the internet. He frequently shifts topics and sometimes interacts with his viewers in the chat during streams. He greets his audience as "girls and gays" and calls donating to him "the Jovan charity." His non sequiturs were described as trivial and dryly humorous, and he often uses slurs sarcastically. In 2019, The Atlantic said that Hill was mostly in his apartment or walking around Los Angeles, noting he often uses the phrase "I’m very poor today."

In December 2018, Hill was active on the now-defunct livestreaming service Periscope, and had accounts on YouTube, Instagram and the subscription service Patreon, making over $4000 monthly. He was also a prolific Twitter user, creating nine accounts after each were suspended. He afterwards moved to Instagram. His Patreon includes a $10 subscription tier for priority in Hill's inbox and a $50 tier where members can message and video-call Hill.

His videos are typically filmed from his apartment on his iPhone X, but are also recorded at parties and on walks. He streams three times daily for ten to thirty minutes at a time. He sometimes streams with Garner, his roommate who was also active on Periscope and on Twitch, Patreon, and Twitter.

== Reception ==
The New York Times profiled Hill in December 2018, mainly around his audience's donations for his living costs, saying that he was able to raise a community around himself and establish "crowdfunding [as] audience participation". The Times categorized him as one of many emerging online influencers whose audience pays them to view their everyday lives. In response to the profile, websites and tabloids such as the New York Post and the Daily Mail published articles severely critical of Hill. The Post called him a "digital beggar," "con artist" and an "unemployed pot fiend" whilst criticizing millennial culture, as did others. Hill received numerous hate comments online and speculated that race may have been a factor in the backlash; he also felt undue weight was given to his marijuana habit. He tweeted, "the weirdest 'hate' ive [sic] gotten is people saying i should be embarrassed like why would i be embarrassed my rent is paid and my blunt is rolled."

In September 2019, Kaitlyn Tiffany of The Atlantic commented on the Times article, saying that "[Hill's] shtick is more like post-webcam camgirl, or self-aware Truman Show" in an article about influencers who charge their fans for "intimacy." Tiffany adds that his fans may, individually, be financially unstable, "but together they can create security for one likable person—an idea as lovely as it is dark."

Hill was nominated for Storyteller of the Year at the 11th Shorty Awards in 2019. He was also highlighted as a "viral sensation" on the Afropunk Festival website.

== Sexual assault allegations ==
In a series of tweets, a Twitter user named @WhiteyPPG, later revealed to be "Riley" by Hill, made allegations against Jovan Hill regarding a sexual assault incident. Riley claimed that Hill had "pressured" him into consuming excessive amounts of alcohol at a bar. According to Riley, Hill then attempted to engage in sexual activity with him while he was unconscious, only stopping after Riley said "Stop, I'm too drunk" multiple times. Riley further stated that he is aware of Hill allegedly sexually assaulting others, urging them to come forward. However, he expressed hesitation in speaking out, fearing backlash and accusations of lying or seeking attention. Hill, in response, posted an apology on Instagram, acknowledging that he too was unable to provide consent due to his intoxicated state and does not remember the incident clearly. He stated that he is not trying to avoid responsibility but, given his lack of recollection, he is relying on Riley's account of what happened.

=== Awards and nominations ===
Year	Ceremony	Category	Result	Ref.
2019	11th Shorty Awards	Storyteller of the Year	Nominated	
