= John Hill (New Zealand cricketer) =

New Zealand cricketer

Personal information
- Born: 22 September 1930; Gore, Southland, New Zealand
- Died: 26 August 2002 (aged 71); Invercargill, Southland, New Zealand
- Batting: Right-handed
- Bowling: Left-arm medium
- Relatives: Robbie Hill (son)

Domestic team information
- Years: Team
- 1953/54–1965/66: Southland
- 1961/62–1962/63: Otago

Career statistics
Competition	First-class
Matches	8
Runs scored	31
Batting average	5.16
100s/50s	0/0
Top score	10
Balls bowled	1,266
Wickets	19
Bowling average	25.42
5 wickets in innings	0
10 wickets in match	0
Best bowling	4/61
Catches/stumpings	3/–
- Source: CricInfo, 21 April 2022

John Hill (22 September 1930 – 26 August 2002) was a New Zealand cricketer. He played eight first-class matches for Otago teams, two during the 1961–62 season and six in 1962–63.

Hill was born at Gore in Southland and was educated at Gore High School. A left-arm medium-pace bowler, he played most of his senior cricket for Southland. In Southland's match against the touring West Indian team in 1955–56, he took 8 for 55 in the first innings. A year later, against the touring Australians, he took four of the six wickets that fell in the Australians' only innings. In his first-class career his best figures came in his last match, for an Otago Invitation XI against the touring MCC in March 1963, when he took four wickets.

Hill died at Invercargill in 2002 at the age of 71. An obituary was published in the 2003 edition of the New Zealand Cricket Almanack. His son, Robbie, also played for Otago and Southland.
