= Frank Hill (scientist) =

American astrophysicist (born 1951)

- Born: July 31, 1951 (age 75); New York City
- Education: City College of New York, University of Colorado, Boulder
- Spouse: Cheryl Brown
- Awards: Association of Universities for Research in Astronomy Service Award
- Scientific career
- Fields: Astrophysics, helioseismology
- Workplaces: National Solar Observatory
- Thesis: Oscillatory probes and direct observations of solar convection (1982)
- Doctoral advisor: Jüri Toomre

Frank Hill (born July 31, 1951) is an American astrophysicist who works at the National Solar Observatory. He was formerly its associate director, and currently serves as the Global Oscillations Network Group program manager.

== Research on the sunspot cycle ==
In 2011, Hill's research, which had used helioseismography to monitor streams below the surface of the Sun, attracted considerable media attention. Although such streams tend to be the "spawning ground" for sunspots, and they had been expected to begin forming in 2008, the study found that these new streams had yet to form. The study in question therefore suggested that the sunspot cycle was going to take longer than expected to reach its next peak, or, according to Hill, might not happen at all. Although Hill and his colleagues refused to discuss the possible effects this weaker solar cycle would have on climate, this was reported on by some media, including the Global Warming Policy Foundation, as evidence that a "mini ice age" was imminent. Hill responded to these reports by telling Reuters that "We have not predicted a Little Ice Age," but rather that "We have predicted something going on with the Sun." In an NSO press release, Hill added that "In my opinion, it is a huge leap from that to an abrupt global cooling, since the connections between solar activity and climate are still very poorly understood. My understanding is that current calculations suggest only a 0.3 degree C decrease from a Maunder-like minimum, too small for an ice age."
