= Robbie Hill =

New Zealand cricketer

Personal information
- Full name: Robert John Hill
- Born: 1 February 1954 (age 72); Gore, Southland, New Zealand
- Batting: Right-handed
- Bowling: Right-arm medium
- Relatives: John Hill (father)

Domestic team information
- Years: Team
- 1976/77–1989/90: Otago

Career statistics
Competition	First-class	List A
Matches	9	5
Runs scored	93	10
Batting average	9.30	10.00
100s/50s	0/0	0/0
Top score	36	7*
Balls bowled	644	171
Wickets	7	5
Bowling average	35.71	28.80
5 wickets in innings	0	0
10 wickets in match	0	0
Best bowling	4/55	2/23
Catches/stumpings	5/–	0/–
- Source: CricInfo, 21 April 2022

Robert John Hill (born 1 February 1954) is a New Zealand former cricketer. He played nine first-class and five List A matches for Otago between the 1976–77 and 1989–90 seasons.

Hill was born at Gore in Southland in 1954, the son of John Hill who had played cricket for Southland and Otago in the 1950s and 60s. Like his father, Robbie Hill played most of his senior cricket for Southland, becoming the first player to play 100 two- or three-day games for the side, and taking part in 36 challenge matches for the Hawke Cup between 1974–75 and 1991–92. He later had senior coaching roles in Southland cricket for more than 20 years.

After playing for Otago age-group sides in the early 1970s, Hill made his first-class debut for the team during the 1976–77 season. He made nine first-class appearances for Otago, the last coming in January 1980; he took seven first-class wickets. After making his List A debut in 1976–77, Hill did not play again in the format for Otago until he made three appearances during the 1985–86 season. His final appearance came four seasons later.
