= Hazel Hill =

Computer, physician and psychiatrist

- Born: Hazel Bertha Hill; 21 July 1920; London, England
- Died: 28 September 2010 (aged 90)
- Occupations: computer, physician and psychiatrist
- Known for: at age 13, calculating firepower of pre-Second World War aircraft
- Notable work: published research into school phobia, anorexia and autism
- Spouse: Chris Baker (m. 1948)
- Children: 4 sons
- Parents: Frederick William Hill (father); Bertha Hill (née Underwood) (mother)

Hazel Bertha Hill (21 July 1920 – 28 September 2010) was a British child psychiatrist and general practitioner, probably best known for her contribution in changing an Air Ministry specification of firepower to be carried by new fighter aircraft before the Second World War.

== Early life ==
Hill was born in London to Frederick William Hill and his wife Bertha (née Underwood).

She was only 13 when she helped her father calculate how many guns the new generation of fighter aircraft would need to bring down enemy aircraft. The pair used mechanical calculators at the kitchen table of their London home. The new aircraft was to have four guns which fired 1,200 rounds per minute and many thought that this would be sufficient. Her father was not so sure. In June and July 1934 they worked at night to create the evidence that her father's boss needed to justify making a large change in the design. They calculated that 256 bullets in two seconds would be necessary to bring down an enemy bomber at the increased speeds of the new aircraft, and for this eight guns were required.

Hazel's son, Robin, said he thinks his mother enjoyed maths because she was partially dyslexic and had trouble with spelling. This led to some teachers thinking she was being naughty as she was obviously intelligent. "I think when she did mathematics, she had none of these problems, which is why it appealed to her so much," Robin said.

The RAF publicly acknowledged Hill's important role in a BBC documentary. Group Captain James Beldon said: "What a great inspiration to young people today, and young girls in particular, who can look upon someone like Hazel in the 1930s making such an important contribution to our later success in the Battle of Britain, which was vital to this country's survival."

== Later life ==
After school, Hill studied medicine at a university in London and joined the Royal Army Medical Corps after graduating in 1943. At the end of the war, she became a GP and in 1948 married Chris Baker, who was one of the soldiers she had treated in the war. The couple moved to Wednesbury, West Midlands, where she got a job setting up a child health clinic in the newly formed National Health Service. She later trained as a psychiatrist becoming a founder member of the Royal College of Psychiatrists in 1972. She published research into school phobia, anorexia and autism.

She had four sons: Robin, Richard, Frank and Ted.

She died, age 90, in 2010.
