= Mark Hill (cricketer) =

Australian cricketer (born 1964)

Personal information
- Full name: Mark Anthony Hill
- Born: 27 July 1964 (age 62); Perth, Western Australia
- Batting: Right-handed
- Bowling: Right-arm fast-medium

Domestic team information
- Years: Team
- 1985/86: Tasmania

Career statistics
Competition	First-class	List A
Matches	5	2
Runs scored	22	–
Batting average	7.33	–
100s/50s	0/0	–
Top score	10	–
Balls bowled	750	120
Wickets	6	7
Bowling average	59.16	10.28
5 wickets in innings	0	1
10 wickets in match	0	0
Best bowling	2/54	5/29
Catches/stumpings	1/–	0/–
- Source: Cricinfo, 2 January 2011

Mark Anthony Hill (born 27 July 1964) is an Australian former cricketer, who played first class cricket and List A cricket for the Tasmania cricket team in the 1985/86 season. He was a right-arm fast-medium bowler.
