= Jamie Hill (rugby union) =

Welsh rugby union player

- Born: 14 June 1999 (age 27) Pontypridd, Wales
- Height: 1.78 m (5 ft 10 in)
- Weight: 79 kg (12.4 st; 174 lb)

Rugby union career
- Position: Scrum-half
Senior career
Years	Team	Apps	(Points)
2020–2024	Cardiff Rugby	12	(0)
2024-2025	Manly Marlins	6	(0)
- Correct as of 12 June 2022
International career
Years	Team	Apps	(Points)
2019	Wales U20s	2	(0)
- Correct as of 27 October 2020

Jamie Hill (born 14 June 1999) is a retired Welsh rugby union player, last playing for side Manly Marlins. His preferred position is scrum-half.

== Cardiff Rugby ==
Initially signing for the Cardiff academy squad. He made his Cardiff debut in Round 3 of the 2020–21 Pro14 against Munster. He is now a member of the Cardiff senior squad.
