= Katie Rain Hill =

American transgender activist and author

- Years active: 2011–present
- Notable work: Rethinking Normal
- Height: 179 cm (5 ft 10 in)

Katie Rain Hill (circa 1994) is an American transgender activist and author. In 2014, she published the award-winning autobiographical book Rethinking Normal (2014).

== Biography ==
Hill was born in Tulsa, Oklahoma to Jazzlyn and Randy Hill, and was bullied as a child. She was depressed for many years, and attempted suicide when she was eight years old. On her 15th birthday, she asked her mom to help with her begin transitioning. In 2012, at age 18, she received gender-affirming surgery.

The same year, Hill and her then-boyfriend Arin Andrews began receiving national attention because they are both transgender. During their time together, the couple received mass media attention and was "featured in a Bruce Weber-led transgender focused modeling campaign for ... Barneys." The couple broke up in January 2014. The same year, they each released memoirs (Some Assembly Required: The Not So Secret Life of a Transgender Teen and Rethinking Normal: A Memoir in Transition) discussing their experiences as transgender individuals, as well as their relationship with one another.

== Rethinking Normal ==
Rethinking Normal is a memoir published September 30, 2014 by Simon & Schuster Books for Young Readers. The book provides " an honest and introspective look into her oft-difficult and pain filled childhood," as well as her experiences transitioning and dating Arin Andrews. Both Andrews's and Hill's memoirs, released in the same year, are the first memoirs about being transgender that are marketed toward a young adult audience.

=== Reception ===
Rethinking Normal was generally well received by reviewers.

Kirkus Reviews indicated that the book "[w]ill both educate cisgender readers and strike sparks of recognition in those questioning their own gender identities."

Publishers Weekly highlighted Hill's honesty, saying, "Part of what makes Katie’s story so extraordinary is that many of her struggles are entirely ordinary (she cheats on Arin, for example...). Being so open—and openly imperfect—makes Katie relatable on a human level, not just as a spokesperson." School Library Journal echoed the sentiment, calling the writing "open and straightforward."

Rethinking Normal has received the following accolades:

- American Library Association's (ALA) Rainbow List selection (2015)
- ALA's Popular Paperbacks for Young Adults nominee (2017)
- Oklahoma Book Award finalist

=== Censorship ===
In December 2021, San Antonio’s North East Independent School District began removing 414 books from school libraries to ensure the books “'do not contain obscene or vulgar material,' based on district standards." The action followed State Rep. Matt Krause (R-Fort Worth)'s October 2021 letter to schools that included a list of over 800 books he thought “might make students feel discomfort, guilt, anguish, or any other form of psychological distress because of their race or sex.” Many of the books on the list, including Rethinking Normal, discuss topics such as racism, sex, and gender identity, and the majority of authors on the list are women, people of color, and/or LGBT. After librarian review, 110 books were permanently removed or replaced, many of which discuss LGBTQ topics, though Rethinking Normal was returned to shelves.

In August 2022, Rethinking Normal was listed among 52 books banned by the Alpine School District following the implementation of Utah law H.B. 374, “Sensitive Materials In Schools." Forty-two percent of removed books “feature LBGTQ+ characters and or themes.” Many of the books were removed because they were considered to contain pornographic material according to the new law, which defines porn using the following criteria:

- "The average person" would find that the material, on the whole, "appeals to prurient interest in sex"
- The material "is patently offensive in the description or depiction of nudity, sexual conduct, sexual excitement, sadomasochistic abuse, or excretion"
- The material, on the whole, "does not have serious literary, artistic, political or scientific value."
