= Sally Hill =

New Zealand professor of Italian studies

- Born: 1971

Academic background
- Education: University of Chicago, University of Auckland

Sarah Patricia Hill is a New Zealand academic, and is a full professor at the Victoria University of Wellington, specialising in Italian cultural studies. Hill researches Italian culture, especially the role of photography in culture, and violence and disability in Italian cinema.

== Academic career ==
Hill completed both a Bachelor of Arts and a Master of Arts at the University of Auckland. Hill went overseas for further postgraduate training, completing a PhD titled Photographic fictions: photography in Italian literature 1945-2000 at the University of Chicago in 2004. Hill then returned to New Zealand, joining the faculty of Victoria University of Wellington that same year. Hill was promoted to full professor in 2022. As of 2024, Hill is an Associate Dean in Victoria's Faculty of Humanities and Social Sciences, and Director of the Bachelor of Global Studies.

Hill studies Italian culture, covering topics such as the role of photography in culture, and violence and disability in Italian film. She has also examined Italian migrants to New Zealand, and migrant writing, and has become interested in the ways that Italian communities "respond to the material history of fascism". She translated into English work by Italian literary critic Sergio Zatti. In 2014 Hill edited a book with Giuliana Minghelli on Italian photographic modernity.

In 2014, Hill was awarded a Teaching Excellence Award, and was nominated for a national teaching award. At that time she was Head of the School of Languages and Cultures.

== Selected works ==
=== Books ===
- Hill, Sarah Patricia; Minghelli, Giuliana, eds. (2014). Stillness in Motion: Italy, Photography, and the Meanings of Modernity. Toronto: University of Toronto Press.
- Zatti, Sergio. The Quest for Epic: From Ariosto to Tasso. Edited by Dennis Looney and translated by Sally Hill.(2006). Toronto: University of Toronto Press. Pp. vii+315.

=== Journal articles ===
- Giorgia Alù; Hill, Sarah Patricia Sally (2018). "The travelling eye: reading the visual in travel narratives". Studies in Travel Writing. 22 (1): 1–15. doi:10.1080/13645145.2018.1470073. Wikidata Q116752192.
- Hill, Sarah Patricia Sally; Luciana d'Arcangeli (2023). "Indelible: Violence Against Women and Their Resistance to It in the Visual and Performing Arts in Italy and Beyond". Violence Against Women. 29 (8): 1471–1476. doi:10.1177/10778012231162044. PMC 10201069. PMID 36946085. Wikidata Q124538054.
- Hill, Sarah Patricia Sally (2023). "Insult to Injury? Women and Mental Disorder in Italian Photography and Visual Culture". Violence Against Women. 29 (8): 1477–1498. doi:10.1177/10778012231162041. PMC 10170574. PMID 36917848. Wikidata Q124538055.
- Hill, Sarah Patricia Sally (2020). "Convivial Encounters: Word and Image in the Work of Rebecca West". Italian Culture. 38 (1): 6–16. doi:10.1080/01614622.2020.1751996. Wikidata Q116752188.
- Hill, Sarah Patricia Sally (2014). "A family affair: the depiction of disability in contemporary mainstream Italian cinema". Modern Italy. 19 (2): 169–181. doi:10.1080/13532944.2014.910505. Wikidata Q116752200.
