= Paul Hill (flight director) =

Former Director of Mission Operations at the NASA Lyndon B. Johnson Space Center

Paul Sean Hill
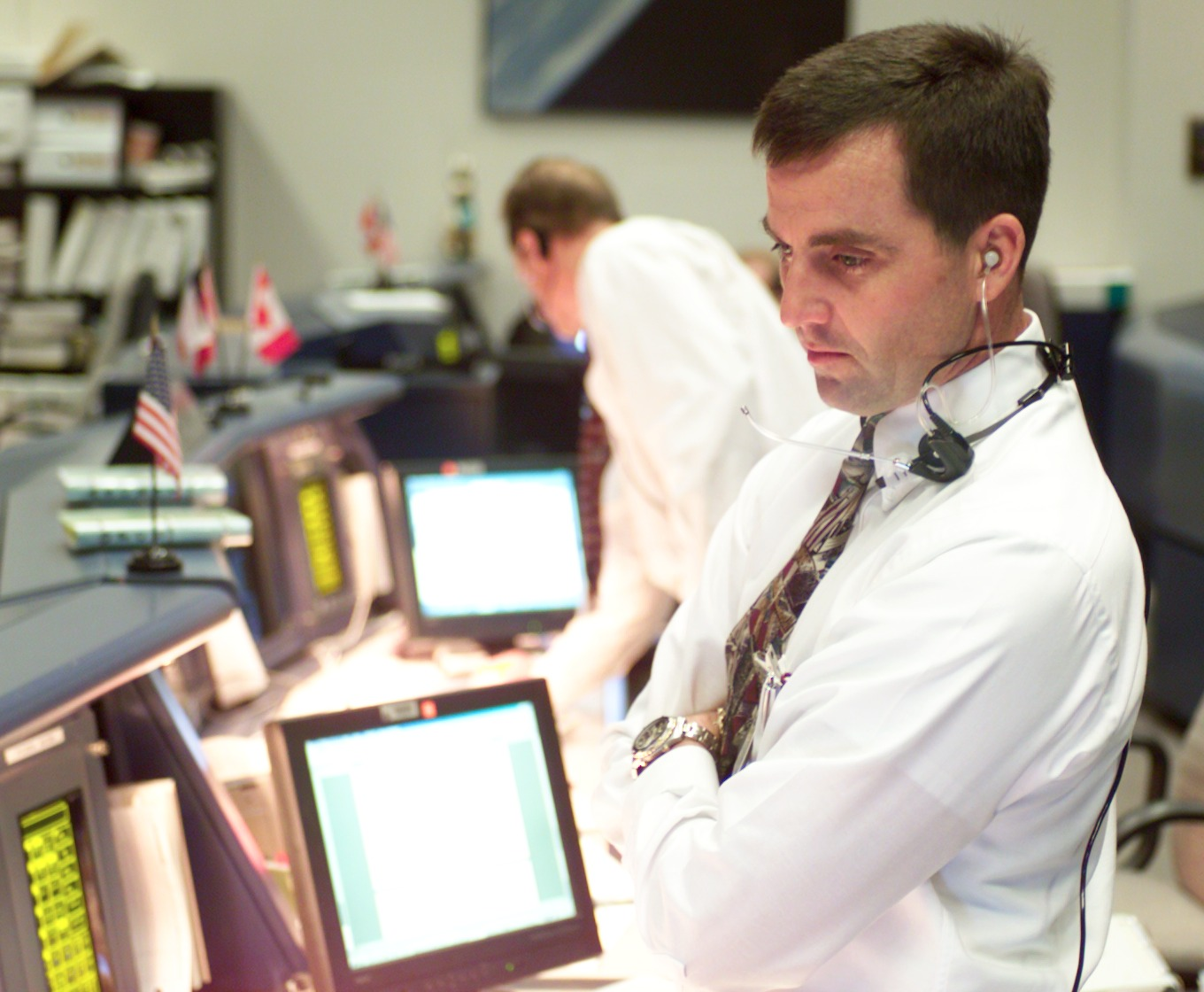
- Paul S. Hill, Flight Director
- Born: June 23, 1962 (age 64); Orlando, Florida, U.S.
- Education: BS and MS, Aerospace Engineering, Texas A&M University
- Occupation: Engineer
- Employer: NASA
- Known for: Flight Director
- Title: Director of Mission Operations
- Spouse: Pam Gerber Hill
- Military career
- Allegiance: United States of America
- Branch: United States Air Force
- Rank: Captain

Paul Sean Hill (born June 23, 1962) is the former Director of Mission Operations at the NASA Lyndon B. Johnson Space Center in Houston, Texas. He was formerly a Flight Director in the Mission Control Center for Space Shuttle and International Space Station missions under the call sign "Atlas".

== Early years ==
Paul Sean Hill was born in Orlando, Florida to Lawrence Edwin Hill and Sonya Kaye Robinson. Hill's father, Larry, joined NASA in 1959 at the Redstone Arsenal (now known as the Marshall Space Flight Center) in Huntsville, Alabama, and worked on every crewed space program from Project Mercury through the International Space Station era. While growing up, Hill migrated from Titusville, Florida to Dallas and Irving, Texas; Marathon and Sugarloaf, Florida; Lexington Park, Maryland; Pensacola, Florida; and back to Irving.

Hill attended nine schools in Florida (Coquina (1st grade), Sue Moore (4th), and Sugarloaf (5th) Elementary Schools, Ferry Pass Middle School (7th and 8th), and Booker T. Washington High School (9th and 10th)); Texas (Jefferson Davis (1st and 2nd) and Farina (2nd - 4th) Elementary Schools); and Maryland (Leonardtown Elementary (6th)) before graduating from Irving High School (11th and 12th) in Irving, Texas.

== Education and training ==
A third generation "Aggie", Hill attended Texas A&M University. He earned a Bachelor of Science degree in 1984 and a Master of Science degree in 1985, both in Aerospace Engineering. He was a member of the Texas A&M University Corps of Cadets and had an Air Force Scholarship. He worked in military satellite operations in the Air Force following his university training, attaining the rank of Captain. During his service in the Air Force, Hill commanded mobile satellite communications crews providing missile launch and nuclear detonation detection, and was responsible for all facets of covert deployment planning for that system. He was also an undergraduate aerodynamics and aircraft performance instructor.

== NASA career ==
After four years in the Air Force, Hill started work at Johnson Space Center in 1990 as a Space Shuttle and Space Station operations engineer. At that time, he was planning was underway for Space Station Freedom, which evolved into the International Space Station. Hill worked as a Flight Control Engineer for Barrios Technology Incorporated from 1990 to 1991, for Rockwell Space Operations Company from 1991 to 1993, and for NASA Johnson Space Center from 1993 to 1996. Hill led development of International Space Station assembly operations and integrated systems procedures. He participated in every formal Space Station design review, three extensive spacecraft redesign activities, and wrote many of the initial Space Station activation procedures. He served as Joint Operations Panel Chairman.

Hill's responsibilities soon expanded, eventually leading to his appointment as a Space Shuttle and ISS Flight Director in 1996, a position in which he served until 2005. In this post, he was responsible for the safe conduct of crewed space flight missions. Hill led the flight control team in flight preparation and execution from Mission Control, and supported over twenty Shuttle and International Space Station missions as a Flight Director. Each NASA Flight Director chooses a call-sign to represent his or her team; Hill chose "Atlas" as the call-sign for his flight control team.

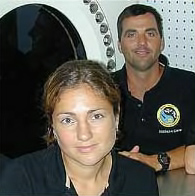
Hill with fellow NEEMO 4 aquanaut Jessica Meir.

Hill led an independent assessment of the Chandra X-ray Observatory’s flight readiness for NASA Headquarters. In September 2002, Hill served as an aquanaut on the joint NASA-NOAA NEEMO 4 expedition (NASA Extreme Environment Mission Operations), an exploration research mission held in Aquarius, the world's only undersea research laboratory, four miles off shore from Key Largo. Hill and his crewmates spent five days saturation diving from the Aquarius habitat as a space analogue for working and training under extreme environmental conditions. The mission was delayed due to Hurricane Isadore, forcing National Undersea Research Center managers to shorten it to an underwater duration of five days. Then, three days into their underwater mission, the crew members were told that Tropical Storm Lili was headed in their direction and to prepare for an early departure from Aquarius. Fortunately, Lili degenerated to the point where it was no longer a threat, so the crew was able to remain the full five days.

Hill led the Columbia accident investigation team responsible for detecting and locating early debris during re-entry; obtaining and analyzing all data collected by government agency sensors during entry; and coordinating radar testing with the Air Force Research Laboratory. He also led the team that developed on-orbit inspection and repair techniques for the Space Shuttle and was the lead Flight Director for its return to flight on mission STS-114. Interviewed in July 2004, Hill said, "Flying the Shuttle is a really dangerous business. But that is not a bad thing. That doesn't mean we should stop flying in space. You can make some changes to make parts of this dangerous endeavor safer, but in the end it's still dangerous."

Hill served as Deputy Manager of the EVA Office at Johnson Space Center from 2005 to 2006, as Manager of Shuttle Operations in the Mission Operations Directorate (MOD) from 2006 to 2007, and as deputy director of Mission Operations during 2007. In December 2007, he became Director of Mission Operations, in which position he is responsible for Mission Operations support for crewed space flights. Interviewed in January 2011 about the downsizing of the Mission Operations Directorate as the Shuttle program ends, Hill said, "I could not be more proud to be part of this great MOD team and the people that comprise this national treasure... The risk of fully eliminating it keeps me awake at night, both for the technical capability and the human impact to these people who are carrying the load for the cause."

In 2024, Hill headed up the agency's Independent Review Board (IRB) that assessed why the heat shield on the Orion spacecraft lost so much material during the 2022 uncrewed Artemis I test flight.

== Personal ==
Hill is married to the former Pam Gerber. They have two daughters who are fourth-generation Aggies. Hill enjoys skiing, traveling with his family, and playing and coaching soccer.
