= F. Marguerite Hill =

Canadian physician (1919-2012)

Dr. Florence Marguerite “Peggy” Hill
- Born: May 24, 1919; Toronto, Ontario, Canada
- Died: January 15, 2012 (aged 92)
- Education: University of Toronto (BA. 1940, MA. 1941, M.D. 1952)
- Alma mater: University of Toronto
- Occupation: Physician
- Years active: 1952-1984
- Employer(s): Canadian Women’s Army Medical Corps, Women’s College Hospital, Toronto General Hospital, University of Toronto

Florence Marguerite “Peggy” Hill (May 24, 1919 – January 15, 2012) was a Canadian physician. She was the Physician-in-Chief of the Department of Medicine at Toronto's Women's College Hospital.

== Early life and education ==
Hill was born in Toronto on May 24, 1919. Her father Frederick was a businessman and her mother was Gertrude Mary Spragg. She grew up in Toronto and attended North Toronto High School.

In 1936, she enrolled in the University of Toronto (U of T) on a scholarship to study Arts and graduated with a Bachelor of Arts in 1940. In 1941, she graduated again from the U of T with a Master's in Psychology. After obtaining her Masters, she worked for a year as a psychologist in the Juvenile Court system.

Hill then returned to the U of T where she obtained her MD in 1952. She was awarded that year's gold medal for the highest academic standing in the Faculty of Medicine. After her graduation Dr. F.M. Hill went on to complete postgraduate training in internal medicine from 1952 to 1957, specialising in kidney disease.

== Career ==
Prior to obtaining her M.D, Hill joined the Canadian Women's Army Medical Corps in 1942, where she was in charge of personnel selection. While in the military, she achieved the rank of captain, and in 1944 she served a tour overseas in England. After being discharged in 1946, Hill returned to the University of Toronto. As a veteran, she was entitled to a free education and could afford to attend medical school.

In 1957, she became the first woman to be appointed chief resident at Toronto General Hospital. She then joined the Department of Medicine at Women's College Hospital as a staff physician in 1958. In 1965, she became physician-in-chief of the Department of Medicine, becoming the second woman to serve as a physician-in-chief of a U of T teaching hospital. During her time at Women's College Hospital, she turned the Department of Medicine into a strong clinical and teaching unit.

In addition to her activities at the hospital, Hill was appointed to the U of T as an associate professor in 1965 and was promoted to full professor in 1968. She was named professor emeritus upon her retirement in 1984.

== Awards, recognitions, and memberships ==
In 1957, Hill became a Fellow of the Royal College of Physicians and Surgeons of Canada and served for many years as an examiner in Internal Medicine for the College. She was also a member of several organizations and boards. In 1968, Dr. F.M. Hill was the first woman appointed to the board of the Canadian Imperial Bank of Commerce (CIBC). She also served on the Women's College Hospital Board of Directors (1966-1982, 1990-1997). In addition, she was a founding member of the Canadian Society for Nephrologists and was a member of the Federation of Medical Women of Canada and the American College of Physicians.

In recognition of her contributions in medicine, she was appointed as a Member of the Order of Canada in 1994. Furthermore, in honour of Hill, Women's College Hospital established an F.M. Hill Chair in Academic Women's Medicine.

== Later life and legacy ==
She retired as Physician-in-Chief of Women's College Hospital in 1984. After her retirement she was appointed as a member of the hospital's Honorary Staff.

Hill died on January 15, 2012, at the age of 93. Her legacy and contributions are honoured during Women's College Hospital's annual F.M. Hill lecture, which showcases current research in women's health.

== Personal life ==
Hill enjoyed travelling and ornithology. Her other hobbies included gardening, knitting and watching Toronto's baseball team the Toronto Blue Jays.
