= Frederick William Hill =

British Military officer (1889–1959)

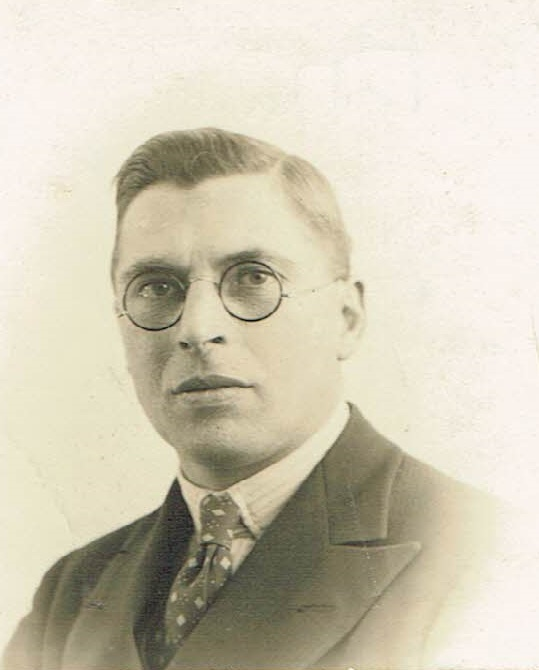
- F.W. Hill in 1934
- Born: 24 February 1889
- Died: 10 November 1959; Colchester, Essex
- Military career
- Branch: Royal Naval Air Service (1915–1918); Royal Air Force (1918–1919)
- Rank: Captain
- Nickname: Gunner Hill
- Other work: Air Ministry (1920–1957)

Frederick William "Gunner" Hill (24 February 1889 – 10 November 1959) is best known for his pre-war calculations that showed that the high speed fighters then being developed (notably the Supermarine Spitfire and Hawker Hurricane) would need to be armed with eight machine guns in order for them to be effective weapons. Captain Hill's technical skills were important in arming aircraft in both World Wars. In World War I he trialled methods of mounting machine guns in aircraft, evaluated heavy aircraft guns including the 37mm Coventry Ordnance Works (COW) gun, tested ammunition to be used against Zeppelins including the Brock bullet and designed and developed aircraft gun sights. In the inter-war period he worked at the Air Ministry where he continued to work on aircraft gun sights as well as showing how they could best be armed with the weapons then available. He made key contributions to the development of the GM2 reflector gunsight that helped the allies gain air superiority over Germany.

== Early life ==
Hill was born on 24 February 1889 into a working class family in London (his father was a warehouseman). He excelled at school in science disciplines. Between 1907–9 he studied for and gained a BSc in chemistry at University College, University of London, and completed a course in teaching in 1910, becoming a certified teacher after which he worked at schools in North London. He married Bertha Winifred Underwood (1890–1950) in 1916.

== World War I – Isle of Grain ==
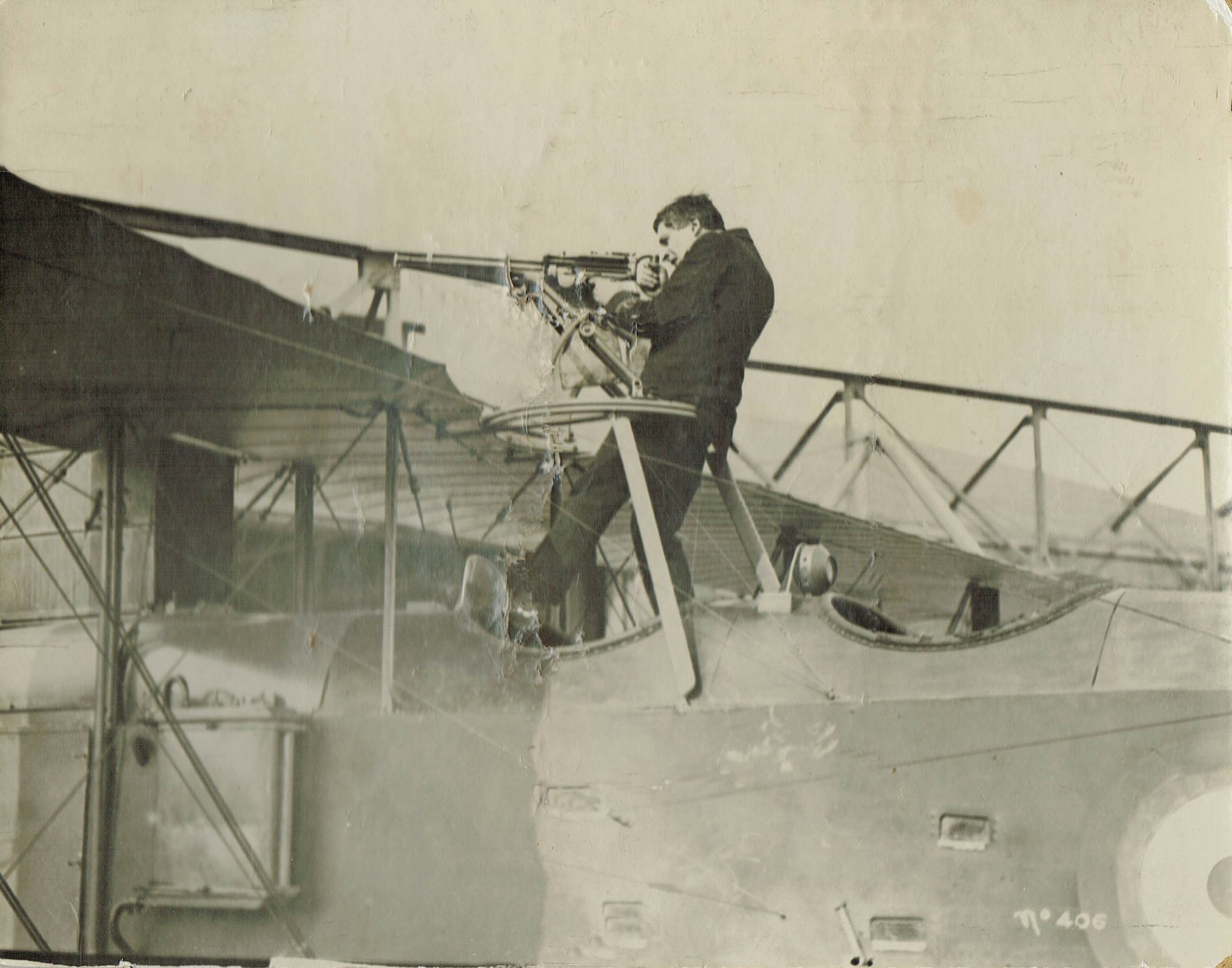
F.W. Hill testing a collapsible gun platform fitted to a Short Type 184 seaplane in 1917

In 1915 he joined the Royal Navy Volunteer Reserve, when his expertise in chemistry, physics, mathematics and engineering were noted.

He received his commission in August 1915 and was appointed as Assistant Experimental Officer at the Isle of Grain seaplane base where he invented two sights for aerial guns. The Experimental Armament Department ("EAD") was formally established at Port Victoria Marine Experimental Aircraft Depot on the Isle of Grain in August 1915 under Flight Lieutenant P.L. Holmes and Sub-Lieutenant F.W. Hill RNVR. Early in 1916 the Department was considerably enlarged and place under the command of Lieutenant Commander E.D.M. Robertson. By February 1917 the EAD had a complement of 111 naval ratings and petty officers. That month Robertson was appointed to the Air Board and the EAD was placed under the command of Lieutenant Commander R.A. Chalmers with Lieutenant J.K. Wells in charge of Section I (trials of Ranken Dart, bombs and bomb gear) and Lieutenant F.W. Hill, Chief Gunnery Officer, in charge of Section II (gunnery and ammunition).

In concentrating on aircraft machine guns, Section II undertook trials of machine gun mountings, development of synchronous guns, and trials of heavy guns, including the quick firing gun and the COW 37 mm gun. In addition, there were trials of the Brock bullet that was used against Zeppelins (this ammunition was also trialled elsewhere, including at Kingsnorth in 1916.)

It was during this period that Hill's interest in the design of gunsights began. A sight described as the ‘Hill’ sight was used in accuracy trials of the COW gun fired from an Airco DH.10 Amiens bomber. In spite of bad weather conditions, the results were very promising.

== The Inter-War Years ==
The RAF was formed on 1 April 1918 and in May 1918 he was promoted to captain and mentioned in dispatches for valuable services. In 1919 he was transferred to the newly formed Air Ministry. Experimental work at Grain continued until 1920, including on ammunition to ignite hydrogen

In 1922 following the "Geddes Axe" which cut the defence budget by 42% and civil service numbers by 38% he twice received several letters advising him he would be made redundant followed by a later letter extending his service. During this period of uncertainty he made plans to return to teaching. However, his position was eventually made permanent (at a lower salary) and he joined the staff of the Armament Research and Development Section of the Air Ministry. He worked in a small section of three headed by Major H.S.V. Thompson and with Captain E.S.R Adams as a colleague. The section concentrated on gunnery. Thompson and Adams were acknowledged gun experts. Thompson played a major part in the selection of the Browning .303 machine gun and Hispano-Suiza HS.404 cannon for the RAF and Adams oversaw the modifications needed to turn the original hand built prototypes of the Hispano cannon into weapons that could be mass-produced and installed in aircraft.

=== Gun sights ===
Hill's main contribution was in working with gunsights and armament trials in which he could bring to bear his mathematical abilities. In accordance with civil service practice at the time discoveries made by civil servants could be patented by them. He was awarded several secret patents relating to reflector gunsight improvements, including the ability to adjust for range. He also patented the use of monochromatic light in gun sights (the 1920s equivalent of the modern red dot sight) and was awarded patents for improvements to machine gun muzzle locks and machine gun synchronisation gear. The reflector gun sight patents were later assigned to Barr and Stroud and used in the guns sights they supplied to the RAF during World War II including the GM2 reflector fixed sights used in fighters from 1938 and the Mk III reflector free sights used in bombers and adopted by the US Navy as the Mark 9.

=== Fighters with eight guns ===
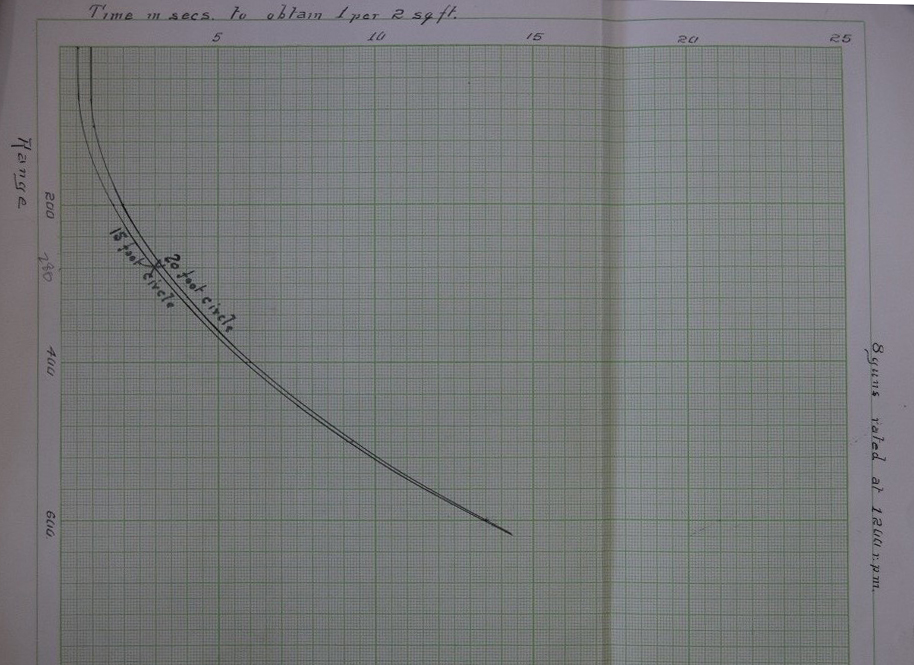
The graph prepared by Hill in his own handwriting. Note the addition in pencil at 280 yards. For more see article on Gun harmonisation

In 1931 Air Vice-Marshal Hugh Dowding asked for air firing trials to be carried out to determine the accuracies that could be obtained at the faster aircraft speeds now being achieved. (He also asked for range adjustable gun sights which Hill helped to incorporate into Barr and Stroud’s GM2.) A long series of air firing trials were carried out between 1931 and 1933 which produced large amounts of data that had to be analysed and summarised by Hill. Often working through the data late at night at home, and helped by a mechanical calculator which he had borrowed from his place of work, Hill would draft in his thirteen year old daughter, Hazel, to assist with the calculations. The results produced were of sufficient quality to enable him to start making predictions about what might happen in actual combat under varying conditions of range and accuracy of sighting. In September 1933 Claude Hilton Keith took over as Assistant Director of Armament Research and Development at the Air Ministry. The conclusion of Hill’s analysis was that future fighters would need to carry no less than eight machine guns each capable of firing at least 1,000 rounds a minute. In order to convince a wider audience within the Air Ministry Keith arranged with Air Commodore Arthur Tedder (then Director of Training) to hold a conference on 19 July 1934 in Tedder’s office at which Hill’s results summarised in the form of graphs were discussed. These were generally accepted and a properly constituted Air Fighting Committee (“AFC”) was set up, holding monthly meetings from 1 November 1934 with a place for the Assistant Director of Armament Research and Development and with Hill as the most junior member. The requirement for fighters to have eight guns was included in the next issued Air Ministry specification for a fighter (F.5/34).

Hill served on the AFC until the outbreak of war. The future tactics of the RAF were worked out by this Committee, which is credited with instigating the multi-gun fighter specification leading to the Hurricane and Spitfire, the adoption of the reflector gunsight and the mechanically driven gun turret. As war loomed the Committee became increasingly important.

=== Other work 1930–1939 ===
Hill carried out various tests and trials for the AFC including on armoured glass requested by Dowding which was later fitted to fighters. He also investigated unusual armaments. Keith records that he sent Hill to France to investigate a mystery weapon that was claimed to bring down power lines. Hill filed a negative report. But his main concern in this period was the installation of reflector gun sights in the fighters and bombers that were now being built. Many problems had to be overcome such as condensation, sunlight reflection, composition of lenses and of course each different plane presented its own installation problems. Additionally Keith asked him to prepare a series of diagrams which offered information on a variety of armament subjects.

== World War II ==
=== Farnborough ===
In 1939 the Armament Research and Development at the Air Ministry moved to Farnborough and worked with the Royal Aircraft Establishment (RAE). In August 1940 Hill arranged trials of an 0.5 in (13 mm) machine gun as compared to the standard Browning .303 machine gun because of concerns about the power of the Browning to bring down German aircraft. Air Chief Marshall Dowding was sufficiently concerned, despite this being the height of the Battle of Britain to attend and he wrote with his impressions to Lord Beaverbrook (then Minister for Air Production) the same day. (Later trials showed that the Hispano cannon as developed by Hill's colleague Captain E.S.R. Adams was superior to the 0.5” machine gun.) At the beginning of the war there were problems with the Browning machine gun overheating and fouling. Hill was involved in tests on heating and fouling and the introduction of the 1940 muzzle attachment designed by BSA.

=== Central Gunnery School ===
In April 1942 C.H. Keith took command of the RAF's Central Gunnery School then based at Sutton Bridge. He recognised the need for a scientist to explain some of the stranger ballistic effects that were appearing as fighter speeds increased and arranged for Hill to be transferred from Farnborough, initially for a limited time. He remained there until the end of the war when he returned to the Air Ministry which by then had become part of the Ministry of Supply.

== Hazel Bertha Hill (daughter) ==
Hazel (1920–2010) was only 13 when she helped her father Frederick to calculate how many guns the new generation of Spitfires and Hurricanes would need to have, to bring down enemy aircraft. The pair used 'calculating machines', which were rudimentary computers, at the kitchen table of their London home. The RAF publicly acknowledged Hazel's important role in a BBC documentary.
