= W. Douglas P. Hill =

British Indologist

William Douglas Penneck Hill M.A.
- Occupations: Translator, writer
- Writing career
- Subjects: Bhagavad Gita, Indology

William Douglas Penneck Hill (1884 – 9 April 1962) was a British Indologist, a scholar of King's College, Cambridge, former assistant master at Eton and principal of Jay Narayan's High School Benares. He is noted for his English commentary and scholarly translation of the Bhagavad Gita.

== Biography ==
He was born in 1884 in London, England. In 1928 he translated the Bhagavad Gita into English. He died on 9 April 1962 in Poole, Dorset, England.

== Review ==
W. Douglas P. Hill, who in 1928 gave us the most outstanding English rendering of the text, was quite conscious of the difference between good and bad translations. He noted in his "Bibliographical Notes" that in the eighteen eighties and nineties the Bhagavadgītā had become "the playground of western pseudo-mystics." He did not appreciate the attempts that he grouped together as "Theosophical Versions"; he referred to the greater part of other works on the Gītā as comparatively worthless," and he added: "Hundreds of vernacular editions have found a home in the Indian Office Library, and still continue to encumber its reluctant shelves."

– Kees W. Bolle
