= John J. Hill =

American stonemason

John James Hill (1853–1932), known as John J. Hill, was born in Leicester, England. He was a stonemason and builder in Utah and Nevada in the United States.

He was a local builder in Tonopah, Nevada.

A couple of his works are listed on the U.S. National Register of Historic Places.

His works include:

- Tonopah Public Library, completed 1906, at 171 Central in Tonopah, Nevada, NRHP-listed
- Alfred and Rosy Skinner House, completed 1905, at 232 W. 800 S. in Orem, Utah, NRHP-listed
