= Rhonda P. Hill =

American fashion industry analyst

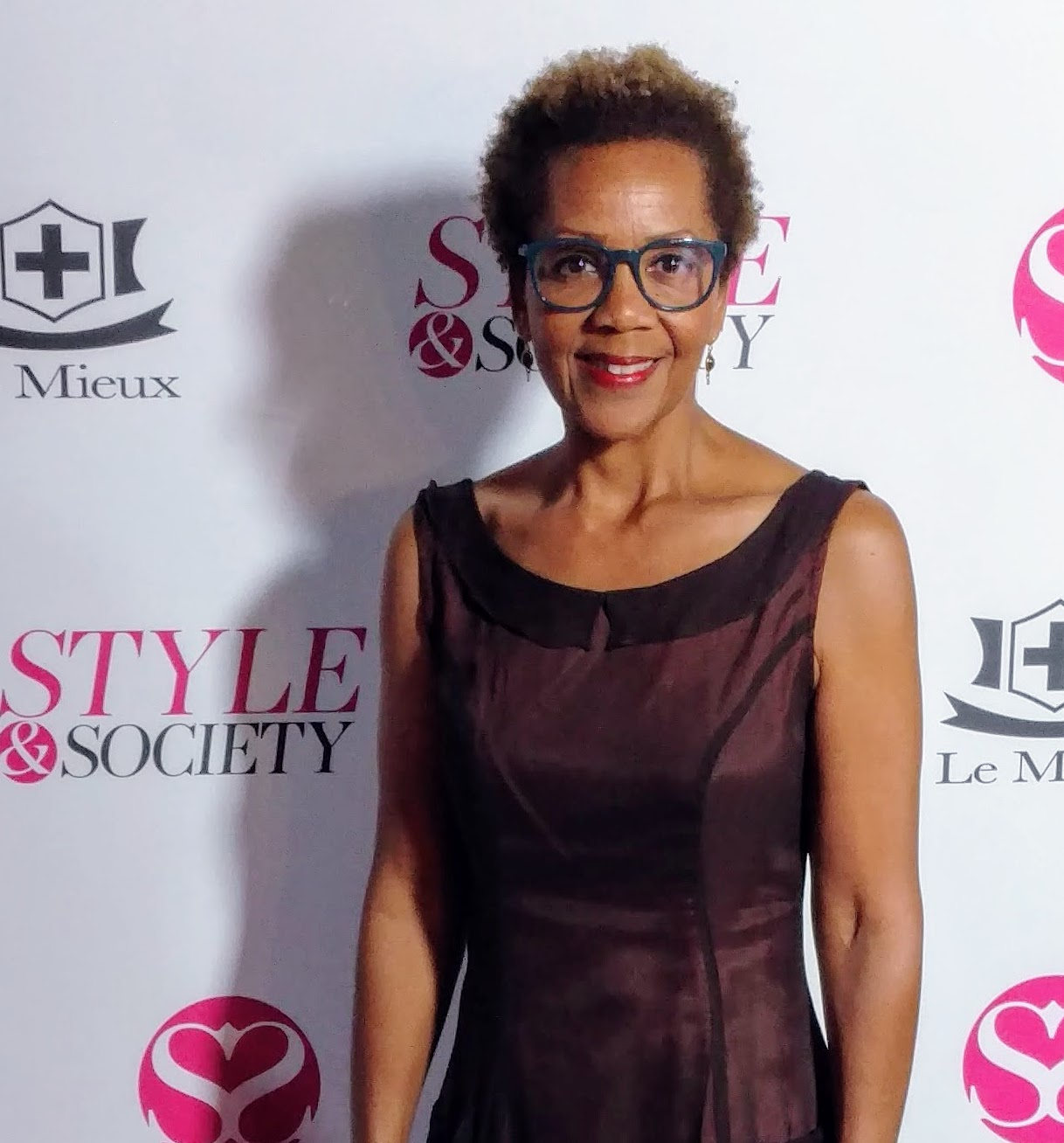
Rhonda P. Hill, Los Angeles Fashion Week, 2017

Rhonda Pnina Hill (born in 1956) is an American fashion industry analyst, curator, founder of EDGE (Emerging Designers Get Exposure for fashion designers), editor-in-chief of EDGExpo.com, a fashion intelligence platform, known for her advocacy of women's rights and minority empowerment, and for promoting ecological and sociological integrity throughout the entire fashion industry supply chain.

Starting in the late 1970s, pursuing a career in a fashion industry with endemic under-representation of African Americans, Hill rose to become the first African-American Vice President of Disney Consumer Products in 1998.

== Early life and education ==
Hill was born in 1956 at Craig Air Force Base in Selma, Alabama. Her father was a Lieutenant Colonel in the United States Air Force and graduate of Tuskegee Institute, Tuskegee, Alabama with Master of Science degrees in Science Education from Tennessee State University, and Business Management from the University of Colorado, Boulder. Her mother was a school teacher and graduate of Alabama State University, Montgomery, Alabama. They were the first college-educated generation in their families. The Hills chose education and a military life to move away from the oppression they had experienced in the South. Rhonda Hill's first exposure to language occurred while her father was stationed in Tokyo, Japan.

Hill's father retired to Glendale, Arizona, where Hill graduated in 1974 from the all-female private high school, Xavier College Preparatory, in Phoenix, Arizona. In 1978, Hill graduated from the University of Arizona in Tucson, Arizona with a Bachelor of Science in Business Administration.

== Career ==
After graduating, Hill moved to San Francisco to work for Macy's, where she was a fashion buyer. Hill held management positions with experience covering the entire production lifecycle of fashion products, including director at Agron Inc, a licensee for Adidas, manager of product development at Levis Strauss & Co, director at Warner Bros. Studio Stores, and Vice President of Disney Consumer Products.

After leaving her corporate positions, Hill founded EDGE (Emerging Designer Get Exposed) a fashion intelligence platform for exposing and mentoring emerging designers who meet certain standards of artistic, cultural, and sustainable practice. EDGE has become an international platform advocating ecological responsibility, design integrity, and human rights throughout the entire product life cycle for fashion products. Exposure of emerging fashion designers is primarily through the website EDGExpo.com which ran a series covering fashion production throughout Africa.

== Philosophy and sustainable fashion ==
A key feature of Hill's work has been the linking of fashion production and design to identity, and our cultural infrastructure. As Hill states, "The power of fashion lies in its ability to transform identity and culture."

The art historian and Head of School of Creative and Liberal Arts, Regent's University, London, Gill Stark, in her history of fashion presentation points out that Hill is known for a comprehensive approach, exposing fashion designers working throughout the African diaspora with an emphasis on women's rights, workforce empowerment, preserving traditional methods, responsible development of industry infrastructure by governments, with originality of design and its integration into personal identity. Hill says that cultures need to look at the sustainability and ecological responsibility throughout the entire product lifecycle, including how products are discarded, in addition to upcycling and recycling.

=== Sustainable fashion ===
Hill is an advocate of sustainable fashion, for brands taking responsibility for the ecological impacts of clothing. As editor of EDGExpo.com, Hill has emphasized sustainable fashion content with a focus on up-and-coming fashion designers who work with sustainable materials, recycle, and upcycle new products from discarded materials. Hill's EDGE Africa series covers designers making a commitment to sustainable fashion, zero waste fashion, and recycling applications.

In the early 1990s, Hill was involved with one of the earliest comprehensive operating standards for responsibility and sustainability throughout the product lifecycle while at Levi Strauss & Co, called their Terms of Engagement (TOE), which has influenced her current advocacy through her EDGE fashion intelligence platform.

=== Fashion history ===
Hill is also noted for her historical projects conducted yearly for the United States Black History Month in February that receive wide distribution in the fashion industry. Topics include surveys of African designers, the African diaspora, the Afropolitan, and studies like A Study of Eight: The Untold American Story which covered neglected achievements of Blacks involved in the history of American fashion from early Black ownership of American cotton mills to the role of Black models and designs in the 1973 Battle of Versailles that altered the status of American fashion design worldwide.

== Curatorial work ==
Hill is a proponent of fashion exhibits as a means of exposing fashion as an art within a contemporary and cultural context. Hill states that "Like art, fashion embodies the time we live in and society bears witness to the interpretation of its historical and cultural significance."

Hill curated the exhibition Blurred Boundaries: Fashion as an Art, that opened on September 21, 2018, at the GraySpace Gallery, Santa Barbara, California, featuring the designers Tingyue Jiang, Alena Kalana, Susan Tancer, and Hera Zhou. Hill claims that fashion is an artistic expression as valid as sculpture and painting.

== Personal life ==
Rhonda P. Hill lives in Portland, Oregon with her husband, visual artist, Erik Reel.
