= Sara B. Hill =

American bookplate designer

- Born: 1882; Connecticut
- Died: 1963
- Citizenship: American
- Education: New York School of Applied Design for Women
- Occupation: American bookplate designer
- Notable work: charter member of the American Society of Bookplate Designers and Collectors

Sara B. Hill (1882-1963) was an American bookplate designer, and a charter member of the American Society of Bookplate Designers and Collectors.

Hill was born in Connecticut. She attended the New York School of Applied Design for Women, where she studied under Alphonse Mucha, developing an appreciation for "conventionalized form" and symbolic design. She also studied with Arthur Dow. In addition to bookplates, she also worked with designs for stained glass, jewelry, book covers, and illumination. Her work was noted for its steady lines, good lettering, and clean design.

Hill was commissioned by her friend Rachel McMasters Miller Hunt to design an official bookplate for the Hroswitha Club, based on an engraving of Hroswitha of Gandersheim by Dürer that Hunt had acquired.

Examples of Hunt's work can be found in bookplate collections at the San Diego State University Special Collections and Archives, the Vassar College Archives and Special Collections Library, and the Stuart A. Rose Manuscript, Archives, and Rare Book Library at Emory University.
