= Ruth W. Hill =

Ruth Walden Hill
- Born: October 24, 1898; Texas, United States
- Died: January 15, 1995 (aged 96); St. Louis, Missouri
- Other name: Mrs. Adolph B. Hill Jr. III
- Occupations: Bank note collector, Honorary Director for Life of the International Bank Note Society
- Spouse: Adolph B. Hill Jr.

Ruth W. Hill (October 24, 1898–January 15, 1995) was an American numismatist who specialized in the collection of historical banknotes from around the world. Referred to as the "Grand Old Lady of Paper Money Collecting in North America” by many collectors, she was well-regarded not only for her extensive numismatic holdings but also for her trailblazing efforts as a woman in a male-dominated field. Hill was a collector of bank notes and one of the foremost researchers of paper currency, and was a highly active member of the numismatic community from the 1950s until her death. By the time of her death, her bank note collection was considered one of the rarest and most extensive in the world.

== Early life ==
Ruth Hill was a native of Texas and lived in both Georgia and Florida before settling down in St. Louis with her husband, Adolph B. Hill Jr. The Mr. Hill worked as a representative for a company that made specialty inks, which included dealings with banks. It was through her husband's dealings with the Banco de México that Ruth Hill first became interested in studying and collecting paper currency.

== Career ==
After her husband's death in the 1950s, Hill's interests in bank notes propelled her to begin attending coin shows and interacting with the nascent American numismatic community. At the time, Hill was one of very few women involved in the field. Hill later said that at the first few coin shows she attended, "she felt out of place as one of the few women there."

Her collection quickly grew to contain some of the rarest bank notes ever issued. Hill was well known for her generosity both in time and resources to other members of the numismatic community, especially noted for her keen assistance to new numismatic collectors and being pivotal in bank note research. Later in her life, Hill also used her collections to promote collecting interests in grade school-age students.

At one point in 1966, Hill quietly saved the International Banknote Society (IBNS) from financial collapse. Her connection with the IBNS would eventually lead her to being appointed board member of the organization and president of IBNS from 1979 to 1981. Hill also served in the Society of Paper Money Collectors and the American Numismatic Society.

== Death ==
Ruth Hill died in St. Louis in January, 1995 at the age of 96. Her collections of bank notes, both American and international, went on to be partially auctioned off or preserved for future generations of bank note collectors. Hill was posthumously named an Honorary Director of the International Bank Note Society for life in 2010 and inducted into the IBNS Hall of Fame.

== Notable holdings ==
Hill's extensive collection included many rare and valuable items, including the following:

- A 10,000 yuan note from 1951 that sold in auction for $199,750 and was described as "'quite simply the rarest note' in the first series of the People’s Republic of China"
- A 1925 10 rupee note from Zanzibar that sold for $64,625
- A German New Guinea 10 marks printed by the Australian occupation forces in 1914 that sold for $49,937.50
- A 1933 cloth one yuan note from the Sichuan-Shaanxi Provincial Workers & Farmers Bank which sold for $18,800
