= Francis Hill (cricketer) =

English cricketer

Francis Hill (1 October 1862 — c. 1935) was an English cricketer. He was a right-handed batsman who played for Somerset. He was born in Timsbury and died in Saskatoon.

Hill made a single first-class appearance for the team, during the 1882 season, against Hampshire. From the upper-middle order, he scored 29 runs in the first innings in which he batted, and 2 runs in the second.
