= July 14 =

Events on calendar date 14 July

July 14 this year in various calendars
- Tuesday, 14 July 2026
Akan	Kwabene
Armenian	29 Hrotich 1475
Aztec	Quecholli 5, 4 Ācatl
Babylonian	28 Simanu, 2337 SE
Balinese pawukon	Menga, Beteng, Jaya, Paing, Was, Anggara of Pujut, Guru, Tulus, Suka
Bengali	30 Asharh, BS 1433
Chinese	Yin Earth Ox・Turtle Beak Mansion; Fire Horse Year, Month 6, Day 1 (Xiaoshu, 9 days until Dashu)
Common Era	14 July 2026 CE
Coptic	7 Epip, AM 1742
Egyptian	29 Athyr, 2775 NE
Ethiopian	7 Ḥamlē, 2018 Amätä Məhrät
French Republican	Décade III, Sextidi de Messidor de l'Année 234 de la République
Gregorian	14 July, AD 2026
Hebrew	29 Tamuz, AM 5786
Hindu	Punarvasu・Vyāghāta; Solar: 30 Āṣāḍha, 1948 SE; Lunisolar: Amāvasyā, Kṛishna pakṣa of Jyeṣṭha, 2083 VE; Rāudra・5127 KY・1,872,770
Icelandic	Þriðjudagur, 23 Sólmánuður 2026
Islamic	28 Muharram, AH 1448 (using tabular method)
ISO week date	2026-W29-2
Japanese	1 Minazuki, Reiwa 8 (Shōsho, 9 days until Taisho)
Julian	1 July, AD 2026 (AM 7534)
Julian day	2461236
Korean	1 Yangdal, 4359 DE
Maya	13.0.13.13.13; 6 Xul, 4 Ben
Roman	Kalendis Iuliis, MMDCCLXXIX AUC
Solar Hijri	23 Tir, SH 1405
Tibetan	30 snron, me pho rta 2153 or 1772 or 1000

<<	July					>>
Su	Mo	Tu	We	Th	Fr	Sa
			1	2	3	4
5	6	7	8	9	10	11
12	13	14	15	16	17	18
19	20	21	22	23	24	25
26	27	28	29	30	31
2026

July 14 in recent years
2026 (Tuesday)
2025 (Monday)
2024 (Sunday)
2023 (Friday)
2022 (Thursday)
2021 (Wednesday)
2020 (Tuesday)
2019 (Sunday)
2018 (Saturday)
2017 (Friday)

July 14 is the 195th day of the year (196th in leap years) in the Gregorian calendar; 170 days remain until the end of the year.

== Events ==
=== Pre-1600 ===
- 982 – King Otto II and his Frankish army are defeated by the Muslim army of al-Qasim at Cape Colonna, Southern Italy.
- 1223 – Louis VIII becomes King of France upon the death of his father, Philip II.
- 1420 – Battle of Vítkov Hill, decisive victory of Czech Hussite forces commanded by Jan Žižka against Crusade army led by Sigismund, Holy Roman Emperor.
- 1430 – Joan of Arc, taken by the Burgundians in May, is handed over to Pierre Cauchon, the bishop of Beauvais.
- 1456 – John Hunyadi and his forces defeat the Ottoman fleet on the Danube, allowing them to reinforce and supply the besieged city of Belgrade.
- 1596 – Anglo-Spanish War: English and Dutch troops sack the Spanish city of Cádiz before leaving the next day.

=== 1601–1900 ===
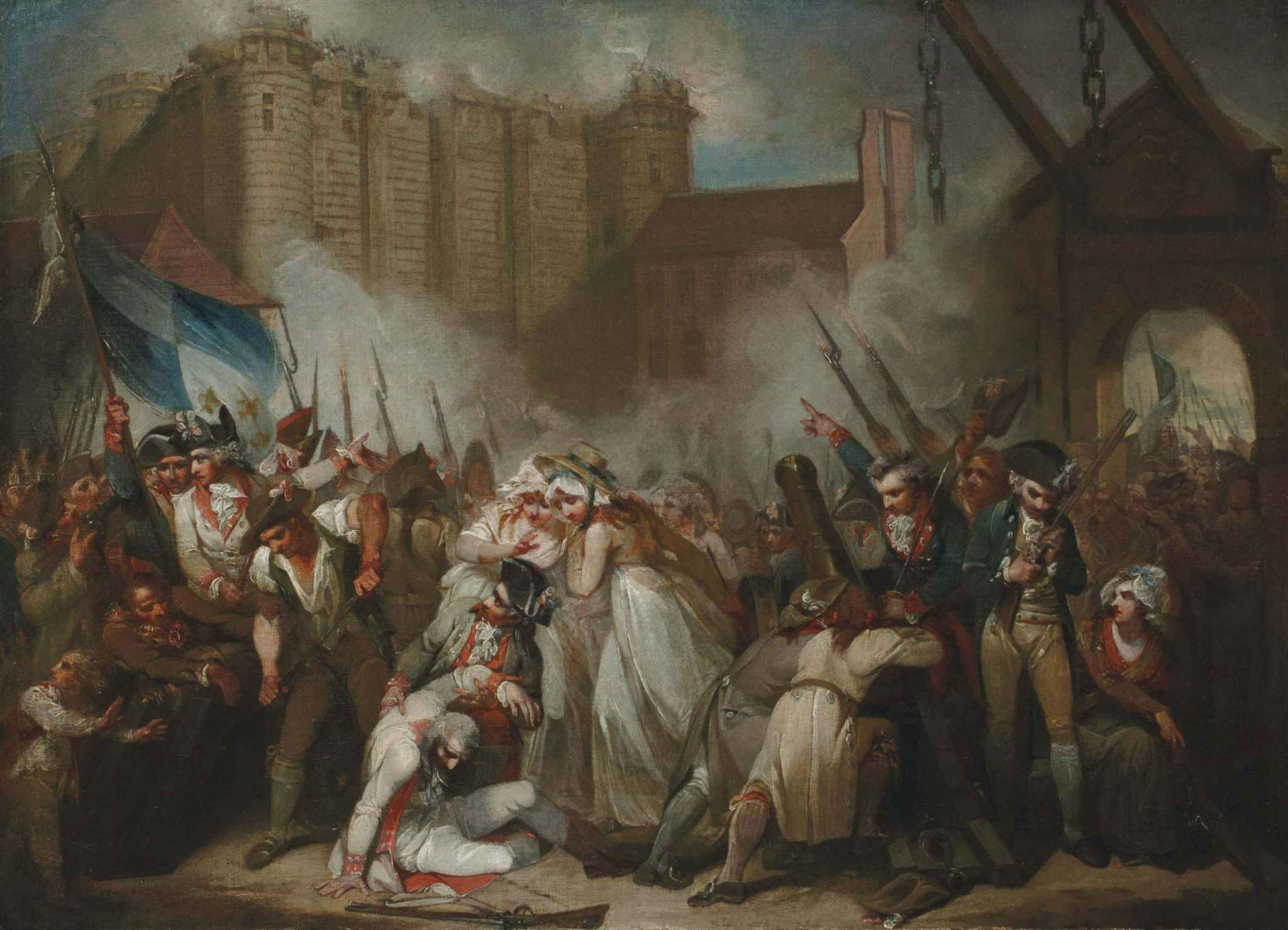
The Storming of the Bastille by Henry Singleton

- 1769 – An expedition led by Gaspar de Portolá leaves its base in San Diego and sets out to find the Port of Monterey (now Monterey, California).
- 1771 – Foundation of the Mission San Antonio de Padua in modern California by the Franciscan friar Junípero Serra.
- 1789 – Storming of the Bastille in Paris. This event escalates the widespread discontent into the French Revolution. Bastille Day is still celebrated annually in France.
- 1790 – Inaugural Fête de la Fédération is held to celebrate the unity of the French people and the national reconciliation.
- 1791 – Beginning of Priestley Riots (to 17 July) in Birmingham targeting Joseph Priestley as a supporter of the French Revolution.
- 1798 – The Sedition Act of 1798 becomes law in the United States making it a federal crime to write, publish, or utter false or malicious statements about the United States government.
- 1808 – The Finnish War: the Battle of Lapua is fought.
- 1853 – Opening of the first major US world's fair, the Exhibition of the Industry of All Nations in New York City.
- 1865 – The first ascent of the Matterhorn is completed by Edward Whymper and his party, four of whom die on the descent.
- 1874 – The Chicago Fire of 1874 burns down 47 acres of the city, destroying 812 buildings, killing 20, and resulting in the fire insurance industry demanding municipal reforms from Chicago's city council.
- 1881 – American outlaw Billy the Kid is shot and killed by Sheriff Pat Garrett in the Maxwell House at Fort Sumner, New Mexico.
- 1900 – Armies of the Eight-Nation Alliance capture Tientsin during the Boxer Rebellion.

=== 1901–present ===
- 1902 – Peruvian explorer and farmer Agustín Lizárraga discovers Machu Picchu, the "Lost City of the Incas".
- 1902 – The Campanile in St Mark's Square, Venice collapses, also demolishing the loggetta.
- 1911 – Harry Atwood, an exhibition pilot for the Wright brothers, is greeted by president William Howard Taft after he lands his aeroplane on the South Lawn of the White House, having flown from Boston.
- 1915 – Beginning of the McMahon–Hussein Correspondence between Hussein bin Ali, Sharif of Mecca and the British official Henry McMahon concerning the Arab Revolt against the Ottoman Empire.
- 1916 – World War I: Battle of Delville Wood begins as an action within the Battle of the Somme, lasting until 3 September 1916.
- 1933 – In a decree called the Gleichschaltung, Adolf Hitler abolishes all German political parties except the Nazis.
- 1933 – Nazi eugenics programme begins with the proclamation of the Law for the Prevention of Hereditarily Diseased Offspring requiring the compulsory sterilization of any citizen who suffers from alleged genetic disorders.
- 1942 – In the Wardha session of Congress, the "Quit India" resolution is approved, authorising Mahatma Gandhi to campaign for India's independence from Britain.
- 1943 – In Diamond, Missouri, the George Washington Carver National Monument becomes the first United States National Monument in honor of an African American.
- 1948 – Palmiro Togliatti, leader of the Italian Communist Party, is shot and wounded near the Italian Parliament.
- 1950 – Korean War: beginning of the Battle of Taejon.
- 1951 – Ferrari take their first Formula One grand prix victory at the British Grand Prix at Silverstone.
- 1957 – Rawya Ateya takes her seat in the National Assembly of Egypt, thereby becoming the first female parliamentarian in the Arab world.
- 1958 – In the 14 July Revolution in Iraq, the monarchy is overthrown by popular forces led by Abd al-Karim Qasim, who becomes the nation's new leader.
- 1960 – Jane Goodall arrives at the Gombe Stream Reserve in present-day Tanzania to begin her study of chimpanzees in the wild.
- 1960 – Northwest Orient Airlines Flight 1-11 ditches off Polillo Island in the Philippines, killing one person and injuring 44.
- 1965 – Mariner 4 flyby of Mars takes the first close-up photos of another planet. The photographs take approximately six hours to be transmitted back to Earth.
- 1983 – Mario Bros. is released in Japan, beginning the popular Super Mario Bros franchise.
- 2001 – Australian criminal Bradley John Murdoch murders British tourist Peter Falconio and abducts his girlfriend in the Northern Territory.
- 2001 – Rus Flight 9633 crashes during takeoff from Chkalovsky Airport, killing all 10 people on board.
- 2002 – French president Jacques Chirac escapes an assassination attempt from Maxime Brunerie during a Bastille Day parade at Champs-Élysées.
- 2013 – Dedication of the statue of Rachel Carson, a sculpture of the environmentalist, in Woods Hole, Massachusetts.
- 2015 – NASA's New Horizons probe performs the first flyby of Pluto, and thus completes the initial survey of the Solar System.
- 2016 – A man ploughs a truck into a Bastille Day celebration in Nice, France, killing 86 people and injuring another 434 before being shot by police.
- 2019 – A GippsAero GA8 Airvan crashes in Umeå, Sweden, killing all nine aboard.

== Births ==
=== Pre-1600 ===
- 926 – Murakami, emperor of Japan (died 967)
- 1410 – Arnold, Duke of Guelders, (died 1473)
- 1454 – Poliziano, Italian poet and scholar (died 1494)
- 1515 – Philip I, Duke of Pomerania (died 1560)

=== 1601–1900 ===
- 1602 – Cardinal Jules Mazarin, Italian-French cardinal and politician, chief minister of France from 5 December 1642 to 9 March 1661 (died 1661)
- 1608 – George Goring, Lord Goring, English general (died 1657)
- 1610 – Ferdinando II de' Medici, Grand Duke of Tuscany (died 1670)
- 1634 – Pasquier Quesnel, French priest and theologian (died 1719)
- 1671 – Jacques d'Allonville, French astronomer and mathematician (died 1732)
- 1675 – Claude Alexandre de Bonneval, French general (died 1747)
- 1696 – William Oldys, English historian and author (died 1761)
- 1721 – John Douglas, Scottish bishop and scholar (died 1807)
- 1743 – Gavrila Derzhavin, Russian poet and politician (died 1816)
- 1755 – Michel de Beaupuy, French general (died 1796)
- 1785 – Mordecai Manuel Noah, American journalist, playwright, and diplomat (died 1851)
- 1801 – Johannes Peter Müller, German physiologist and anatomist (died 1858)
- 1816 – Arthur de Gobineau, French writer who founded Gobinism to promote development of racism (died 1882)
- 1825 – Georgiana Hill, English cookery book writer (died 1903)
- 1829 – Edward Benson, English archbishop (died 1896)
- 1859 – Willy Hess, German violinist and educator (died 1928)
- 1861 – Kate M. Gordon, American activist (died 1931)
- 1862 – Florence Bascom, American geologist and educator (died 1945)
- 1862 – Gustav Klimt, Austrian painter and illustrator (died 1918)
- 1865 – Arthur Capper, American journalist and politician, 20th Governor of Kansas (died 1951)
- 1866 – Juliette Wytsman, Belgian painter (died 1925)
- 1868 – Gertrude Bell, English archaeologist and political officer (died 1926)
- 1872 – Albert Marque, French sculptor and doll maker (died 1939)
- 1874 – Abbas II of Egypt (died 1944)
- 1874 – Crawford Vaughan, Australian politician, 27th Premier of South Australia (died 1947)
- 1878 – Donald Meek, Scottish-American stage and film actor (died 1946)
- 1885 – Sisavang Vong, Laotian king (died 1959)
- 1888 – Scipio Slataper, Italian author and critic (died 1915)
- 1889 – Marco de Gastyne, French painter and illustrator (died 1982)
- 1889 – Ante Pavelić, Croatian fascist dictator during World War II (died 1959)
- 1893 – Clarence J. Brown, American publisher and politician, 36th Lieutenant Governor of Ohio (died 1965)
- 1893 – Garimella Satyanarayana, Indian poet and author (died 1952)
- 1894 – Dave Fleischer, American animator, director, and producer (died 1979)
- 1895 – F.R. Leavis, British literary critic (died 1978)
- 1896 – Buenaventura Durruti, Spanish soldier and anarchist (died 1936)
- 1897 – Plaek Phibunsongkhram, Thai military officer and politician, 3rd Prime Minister of Thailand (died 1964)
- 1898 – Happy Chandler, American lawyer and politician, 49th Governor of Kentucky, second Commissioner of Baseball (died 1991)

=== 1901–present ===
- 1901 – Gerald Finzi, English composer and academic (died 1956)
- 1903 – Irving Stone, American author and educator (died 1989)
- 1907 – Chico Landi, Brazilian racing driver (died 1989)
- 1910 – William Hanna, American animator, director, producer, and actor, co-founded Hanna-Barbera (died 2001)
- 1911 – Pavel Prudnikau, Belarusian poet and author (died 2000)
- 1912 – Northrop Frye, Canadian literary critic (died 1991)
- 1912 – Woody Guthrie, American singer-songwriter and guitarist (died 1967)
- 1913 – Gerald Ford, American commander, lawyer, and politician, 38th President of the United States (died 2006)
- 1918 – Fred Baur, American chemist and founder of Pringles (died 2008)
- 1918 – Ingmar Bergman, Swedish director, producer, and screenwriter (died 2007)
- 1918 – Arthur Laurents, American director, screenwriter, and playwright (died 2011)
- 1918 – Jay Wright Forrester, American computer engineer and systems scientist (died 2016)
- 1920 – Shankarrao Chavan, Indian lawyer and politician, Indian Minister of Finance (died 2004)
- 1921 – Sixto Durán Ballén, American-Ecuadorian architect and politician, 48th President of Ecuador (died 2016)
- 1921 – Leon Garfield, English author (died 1996)
- 1921 – Armand Gaudreault, Canadian ice hockey player (died 2013)
- 1921 – Geoffrey Wilkinson, English chemist and academic, Nobel Prize laureate (died 1996)
- 1922 – Robin Olds, American general and pilot (died 2007)
- 1922 – Elfriede Rinkel, German concentration camp guard at Ravensbruck (died 2018)
- 1922 – Käbi Laretei, Estonian-Swedish concert pianist (died 2014)
- 1923 – René Favaloro, Argentine surgeon and cardiologist (died 2000)
- 1923 – Dale Robertson, American actor (died 2013)
- 1923 – Robert Zildjian, American businessman, founded Sabian (died 2013)
- 1924 – Warren Giese, American football player, coach, and politician (died 2013)
- 1924 – Dorothy Stanley, American educator (died 1990)
- 1925 – Bruce L. Douglas, American politician (died 2025)
- 1926 – Wallace Jones, American basketball player and coach (died 2014)
- 1926 – Harry Dean Stanton, American actor, musician, and singer (died 2017)
- 1926 – Himayat Ali Shair, Urdu poet (died 2019)
- 1927 – John Chancellor, American journalist (died 1996)
- 1927 – Mike Esposito, American author and illustrator (died 2010)
- 1928 – Nancy Olson, American actress
- 1928 – William Rees-Mogg, English journalist and public servant (died 2012)
- 1929 – Jacqueline de Ribes, French fashion designer and philanthropist (died 2025)
- 1930 – Polly Bergen, American actress and singer (died 2014)
- 1930 – Benoît Sinzogan, Beninese military officer and politician (died 2021)
- 1932 – Del Reeves, American country singer-songwriter (died 2007)
- 1933 – Robert Bourassa, Canadian lawyer and politician, 22nd Premier of Quebec (died 1996)
- 1933 – Dumaagiin Sodnom, Mongolian politician; 13th Prime Minister of Mongolia
- 1934 – Lee Elder, American golfer (first African-American to play in the US Masters) (died 2021)
- 1934 – Lee Friedlander, American portrait, and 'social landscape' photographer, and album cover artist
- 1935 – Ei-ichi Negishi, Japanese chemist (palladium-catalyzed cross couplings) and Nobel Prize winner (died 2021)
- 1936 – Robert F. Overmyer, American colonel, pilot, and astronaut (died 1996)
- 1937 – Yoshirō Mori, Japanese journalist and politician, 55th Prime Minister of Japan
- 1938 – Jerry Rubin, American activist, author, and businessman (died 1994)
- 1938 – Moshe Safdie, Israel-Canadian-American architect
- 1939 – Karel Gott, Czech singer-songwriter and actor (died 2019)
- 1940 – Susan Howatch, English author and academic
- 1941 – Maulana Karenga, American philosopher, author, and activist, created Kwanzaa
- 1941 – Andreas Khol, German-Austrian lawyer and politician
- 1942 – Javier Solana, Spanish physicist and politician, Spanish Minister of Foreign Affairs
- 1945 – Jim Gordon, American rock drummer and convicted murderer (died 2023)
- 1947 – John Blackman, Australian radio and television presenter (died 2024)
- 1947 – Navin Ramgoolam, Mauritius physician and politician, 3rd Prime Minister of Mauritius
- 1948 – Goodwill Zwelithini kaBhekuzulu, Zulu king (died 2021)
- 1949 – Tommy Mottola, American businessman and music publisher
- 1950 – Bruce Oldfield, English fashion designer
- 1950 – Andy Newmark, American session and touring drummer (Carly Simon, George Harrison; John Lennon)
- 1952 – Bob Casale, American musician, member of Devo (died 2014)
- 1960 – Anna Bligh, Australian politician, 37th Premier of Queensland
- 1960 – Kyle Gass, American musician, comedian, and actor
- 1960 – Angélique Kidjo, Beninese singer-songwriter, activist and actress
- 1960 – Jane Lynch, American actress (Glee), comedian, author, and game show host
- 1961 – Jackie Earle Haley, American actor and director
- 1961 – Howard Lutnick, American businessman, CEO of Cantor Fitzgerald, secretary of commerce in the Trump administration
- 1966 – Matthew Fox, American actor
- 1967 – Robin Ventura, American baseball player
- 1971 – Bubba Ray Dudley, American professional wrestler
- 1972 – Steph Bridge, British World Champion kitesurfer
- 1975 – Tim Hudson, American baseball player
- 1977 – Victoria, Crown Princess of Sweden
- 1984 – Dagbjört Hákonardóttir, Icelandic politician
- 1984 – Samir Handanović, Slovenian footballer
- 1985 – Darrelle Revis, American football player
- 1985 – Phoebe Waller-Bridge, English actress and screenwriter
- 1986 – Dan Smith, British singer, songwriter and record producer
- 1987 – Adam Johnson, English footballer
- 1987 – Dan Reynolds, American singer-songwriter
- 1988 – Conor McGregor, Irish mixed martial artist
- 1988 – Jérémy Stravius, French swimmer
- 1990 – Paulo Muacho, Portuguese politician
- 1994 – Lucas Giolito, American baseball player
- 1995 – Harrison Butker, American football player
- 1995 – Kim In-hyeok, South Korean volleyball player (died 2022)
- 1997 – Neekolul, American internet personality
- 2003 – Haley Winn, American hockey player
- 2004 – Noah Clowney, American basketball player

== Deaths ==
=== Pre-1600 ===
- 664 – Eorcenberht, king of Kent
- 809 – Otomo no Otomaro, Japanese general and Shogun (born 731)
- 850 – Wei Fu, chancellor of the Tang Dynasty
- 937 – Arnulf I, duke of Bavaria
- 1223 – Philip II, king of France (born 1165)
- 1262 – Richard de Clare, 6th Earl of Gloucester, English soldier (born 1222)
- 1486 – Margaret of Denmark, daughter of Christian I of Denmark (born 1456)
- 1526 – John de Vere, 14th Earl of Oxford, English peer, landowner, and Lord Great Chamberlain of England (born 1499)
- 1575 – Richard Taverner, English translator (born 1505)

=== 1601–1900 ===
- 1614 – Camillus de Lellis, Italian priest and saint (born 1550)
- 1723 – Claude Fleury, French historian and author (born 1640)
- 1742 – Richard Bentley, English scholar and theologian (born 1662)
- 1774 – James O'Hara, 2nd Baron Tyrawley, Irish field marshal (born 1682)
- 1780 – Charles Batteux, French philosopher and academic (born 1713)
- 1789 – Jacques de Flesselles, French politician (born 1721)
- 1789 – Bernard-René de Launay, French politician (born 1740)
- 1790 – Ernst Gideon von Laudon, Austrian field marshal (born 1717)
- 1809 – Nicodemus the Hagiorite, Greek monk and saint (born 1749)
- 1816 – Francisco de Miranda, Venezuelan general (born 1750)
- 1817 – Germaine de Staël, French philosopher and author (born 1766)
- 1827 – Augustin-Jean Fresnel, French physicist and engineer, reviver of wave theory of light, inventor of catadioptric lighthouse lens (born 1788)
- 1834 – Edmond-Charles Genêt, French-American diplomat (born 1763)
- 1840 – Sir George Pocock, 1st Baronet, English politician and peer (born 1765)
- 1850 – August Neander, German historian and theologian (born 1789)
- 1856 – Edward Vernon Utterson, English lawyer and historian (born 1775)
- 1876 – John Buckley, English soldier, Victoria Cross recipient (born 1813)
- 1881 – William H. Bonney aka Billy the Kid, American gunfighter and outlaw (born 1859 or 1860)

=== 1901–present ===
- 1904 – Paul Kruger, South African politician, 5th President of the South African Republic (born 1824)
- 1907 – William Henry Perkin, English chemist and academic (born 1838)
- 1910 – Marius Petipa, French dancer and choreographer (born 1818)
- 1917 – Octave Lapize, French cyclist (born 1887)
- 1918 – Quentin Roosevelt, American lieutenant and pilot (born 1897)
- 1936 – Dhan Gopal Mukerji, Indian-American author and scholar (born 1890)
- 1937 – Julius Meier, American businessman and politician, 20th Governor of Oregon (born 1874)
- 1939 – Alphonse Mucha, Czech painter and illustrator (born 1860)
- 1954 – Jacinto Benavente, Spanish author and playwright, Nobel Prize laureate (born 1866)
- 1965 – Adlai Stevenson II, American soldier and politician, 5th United States Ambassador to the United Nations (born 1900)
- 1966 – Julie Manet, French painter and art collector (born 1878)
- 1967 – Tudor Arghezi, Romanian author and poet (born 1880)
- 1968 – Konstantin Paustovsky, Russian author and poet (born 1892)
- 1970 – Preston Foster, American actor (born 1900)
- 1974 – Carl Spaatz, American World War II general; commander of the Strategic Air Forces in Europe (born 1891)
- 1980 – Carlos López Moctezuma, Mexican actor (born 1909).
- 1984 – Ernest Tidyman, American author and screenwriter; Academy Award winner for The French Connection (born 1928)
- 1984 – Philippe Wynne, American soul singer (The Spinners) (born 1941)
- 1986 – Raymond Loewy, French-American industrial designer (born 1893)
- 1991 – Constance Stokes, Australian painter (born 1906)
- 1993 – Léo Ferré, Monacan singer-songwriter, pianist, and poet (born 1916)
- 1998 – Richard McDonald, American businessman, co-founded McDonald's (born 1909)
- 2000 – Pepo, Chilean cartoonist; creator of Condorito (born 1911)
- 2005 – Cicely Saunders, English hospice founder (born 1918)
- 2017 – Maryam Mirzakhani, Iranian mathematician (born 1977)
- 2018 – Harold Covington, American neo-Nazi and white separatist (born 1953)
- 2020 – Rosa, Spanish-born cow on French television (born 2001)
- 2022 – Ivana Trump, Czech-American socialite and model (born 1949)
- 2024 – Jacoby Jones, American football player (born 1984)
- 2025 – B. Saroja Devi, Indian actress (born 1938)
- 2025 – Andrea Gibson, American poet and activist (born 1975)
- 2025 – John MacArthur, American evangelical preacher (born 1939)
- 2025 – Fauja Singh, British-Indian centenarian marathon runner

== Holidays and observances ==
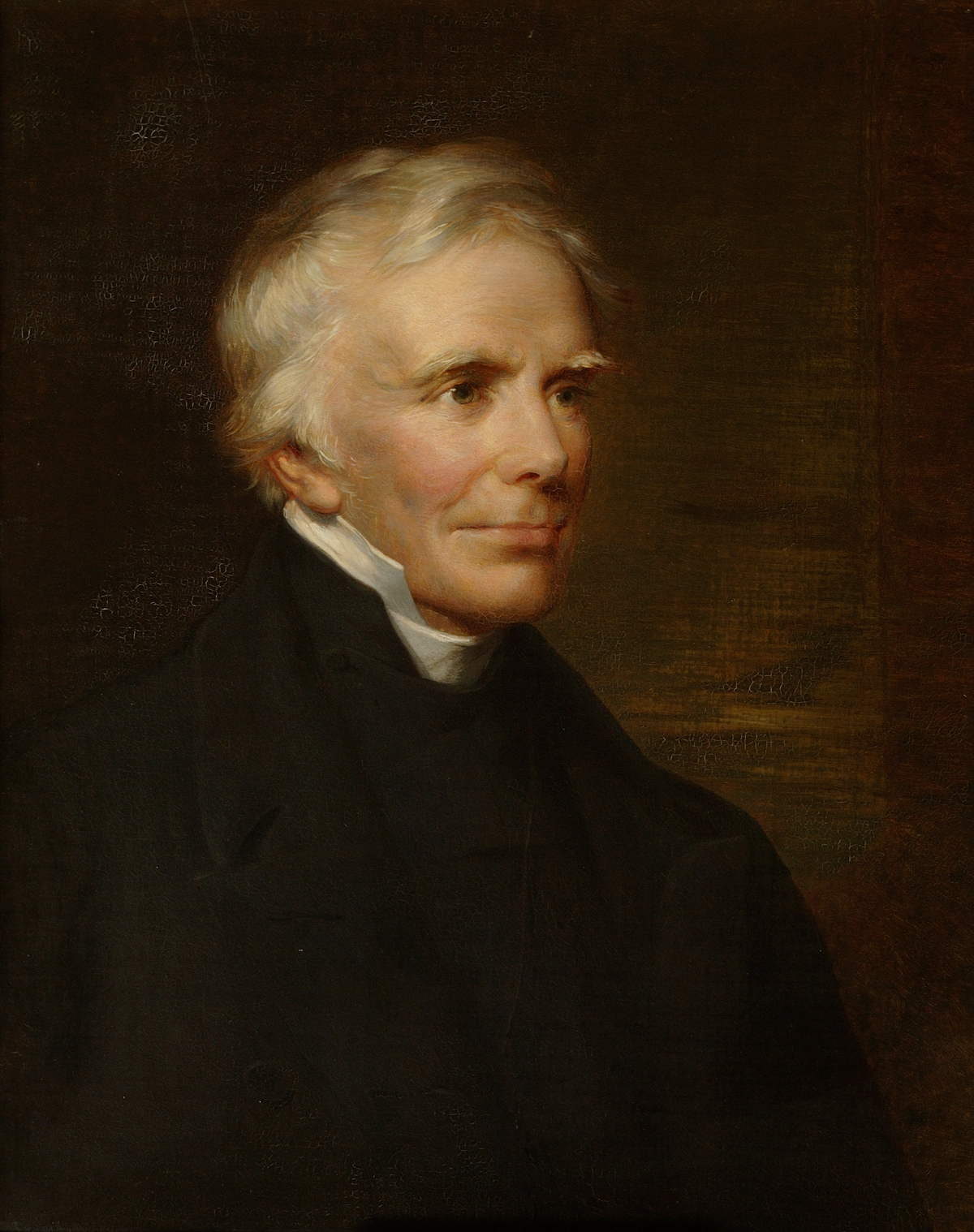
John Keble's feast day is 14 July, the anniversary of his Assize Sermon on "National Apostasy" in 1833.

- Christian feast day:
  - Blessed Angeline of Marsciano
  - Gaspar de Bono
  - Camillus of Lellis (Roman Catholic Church, except in the United States)
  - Deusdedit of Canterbury
  - Francis Solanus
  - Blessed Ghébrē-Michael
  - John Keble (Church of England)
  - Samson Occom (Episcopal Church (United States)
  - July 14 (Eastern Orthodox liturgics)
- Bastille Day (France and dependencies)
- International Non-Binary People's Day
- Republic Day (Iraq)
- Victoria Day (Sweden). The birthday of Crown Princess Victoria is an official flag flying day in Sweden.
- North Korean Defectors' Day (in South Korea)
