= Avis Crocombe =

English cook

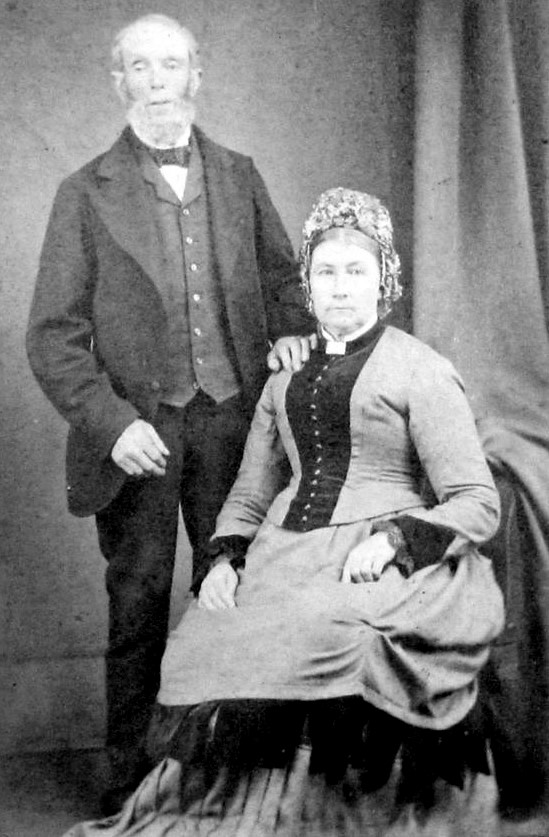
- Possible image of Avis Crocombe and husband Benjamin Stride, 1886
- Born: c. 1839; Martinhoe, Devon, England
- Died: 1927 (aged 88); Marylebone, London, England
- Occupation: Cook
- Known for: Head cook at Audley End House
- Spouse: Benjamin Stride (m. 1884)

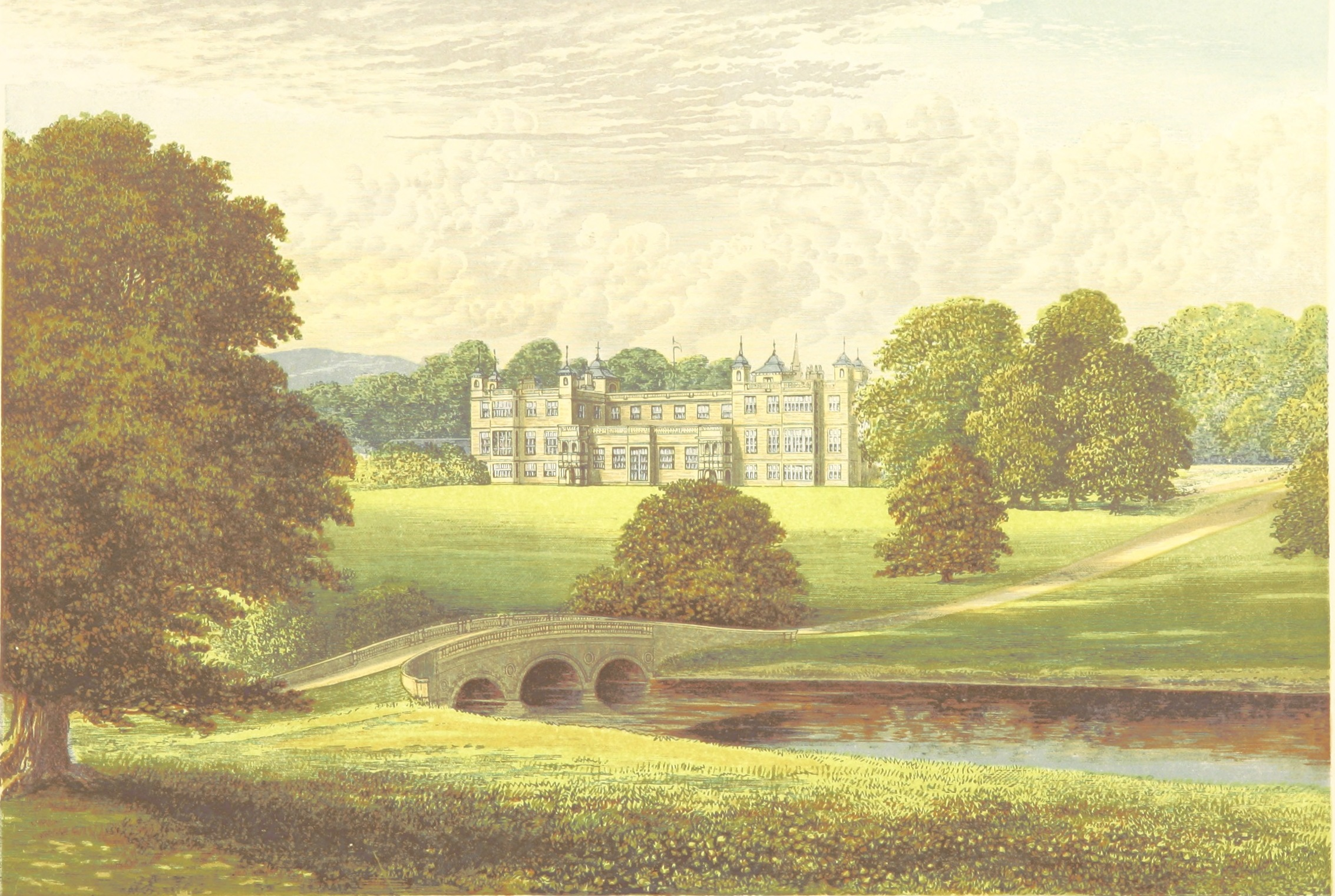
"Audley End" from Morris's Country Seats (1880)

Avis Crocombe (c. 1839–1927) was an English domestic servant who was the head cook during the 1880s at Audley End House, a 17th-century country house near Saffron Walden in England. She found fame nearly a century after her death due to being portrayed in a series of YouTube videos made by English Heritage, who now manage the estate. These include a small selection from her own manuscript cookery book. Crocombe and other individuals from the 1880s are the focus of a long-running live interpretation project at Audley End, which started in 2008 and ended in December 2024.

== Life ==
Avis Crocombe was born into a large family at Martinhoe, Devon, around 1839 to Richard Crocombe, a farmer, and Agnes Crocombe.

Crocombe entered domestic service before her 13th birthday. She initially worked for her brother John in Devon, but by 1861 was working as a kitchenmaid for John Townshend, Viscount Sydney, one of a staff of at least 10, including a male cook and several footmen. By 1871, she was working as a cook and housekeeper in the household of Thomas Proctor Beauchamp at Langley Hall, Norfolk, one of 16 servants employed by the family. Sometime before 1881, she became cook to the family of the 5th Baron Braybrooke whose country seat was at Audley End House near Saffron Walden. As was usual for cooks, she also worked at the family's home in London at Upper Brook Street, and for them in their seaside home at Branksome Towers in Bournemouth. She replaced a male French chef ("Monsieur Merer"), as the family was probably cost-cutting. Avis would have been substantially cheaper. Although staff wages are not known at Audley for 1881, in general male cooks commanded around £100-120 a year (the upper end if French), whereas women's salaries ranged from £40-60. Those who, like Crocombe, had trained under male cooks could expect higher wages than those who had not.

Avis Crocombe left Audley End in 1884 when she married Benjamin Stride, who ran a lodging house in London. He died in 1893, leaving £496.6s.8d, and she continued to run the business, along with his daughter (her step-daughter) Anna-Jane. She died in 1927, aged 88, by now an employer of servants herself.

== Legacy ==
In 2008, English Heritage, a charity which cares for over 400 monuments and sites across England, including Audley End, undertook a multi-million pound restoration of the service wing, funded by the Heritage Lottery Fund. As part of the interpretation, historical interpretation company Past Pleasures provided costumed characters, who animated the service wing portraying the servants as listed in the 1881 census. The project centred around live cookery, with the team in character, talking to the public and sharing with them recipes from the era. It was initially led by food historian Annie Gray, and then by historical interpreter and educator, Kathy Hipperson. Initially, recipes were sourced from books appropriate to the era, but in 2009, Benjamin Stride's descendant Robert Stride bought tickets to see a concert at Audley End. The name sparked a memory, and he realised that he had Avis's hand-written recipe book in a drawer. He donated it to English Heritage, and the costumed team were able to integrate Avis Crocombe's recipes into their work. The book also enabled Gray to work more closely on the sources available to Crocombe, and the style of cookery likely to have been seen at Audley in the 1880s. Crocombe copied several recipes from Eliza Acton's Modern Cookery for Private Families (1845), for example, while others were sourced from newspapers and visitors to the house.

From 2008-2025 Avis Crocombe was regularly portrayed as part of the interpretation at the house, led firstly by Past Pleasures and latterly by Time Will Tell, and was played by a number of different interpreters. In 2025, as part of a wider programme of budget cuts, the professional live interpretation project came to an end.

=== YouTube ===
English Heritage has commissioned a number of videos for their YouTube channel featuring Kathy Hipperson playing Mrs Crocombe. Coming under the banner of The Victorian Way, they are part-demonstration, part-historical showcase, and draw upon recipes from both her manuscript book and many others from the period, to both engage and entertain as part of English Heritage's mission, to 'inspire and entertain', with 'authenticity, quality, imagination, responsibility and fun'. The videos were produced by Gareth Clifford of the Digital Content Team, assisted by Annie Gray, and several English Heritage staff have also appeared, including historian Andrew Hann (whose work on Avis has enabled positive identification of a photograph donated with the recipe book as probably being Avis and Benjamin), and the current curator of Audley End, Peter Moore. In 2018 English Heritage also collaborated with James Townsend & Son, an American costumed interpretation and historic props company, with crossover videos featuring packages sent from the UK to the US and vice versa. English Heritage has also collaborated with dress historian Bernadette Banner in three videos.

The Victorian Way videos had received over 200 million views as of June 2021. In June 2019, English Heritage won both Breakthrough Advertiser and the Grand Prix awards at the YouTube Works (UK) awards. In late 2019, a tie-in book was announced with recipes and history. The book was eventually released in September 2020 and titled "How To Cook The Victorian Way With Mrs Crocombe".

With the announcement in early 2025 by English Heritage of its restructuring plan, and the live interpretation project ending, the last Victorian Way video was released in December 2025. Hipperson and Gray have since gone on to work on another set of historic cooking videos with The Food Museum.

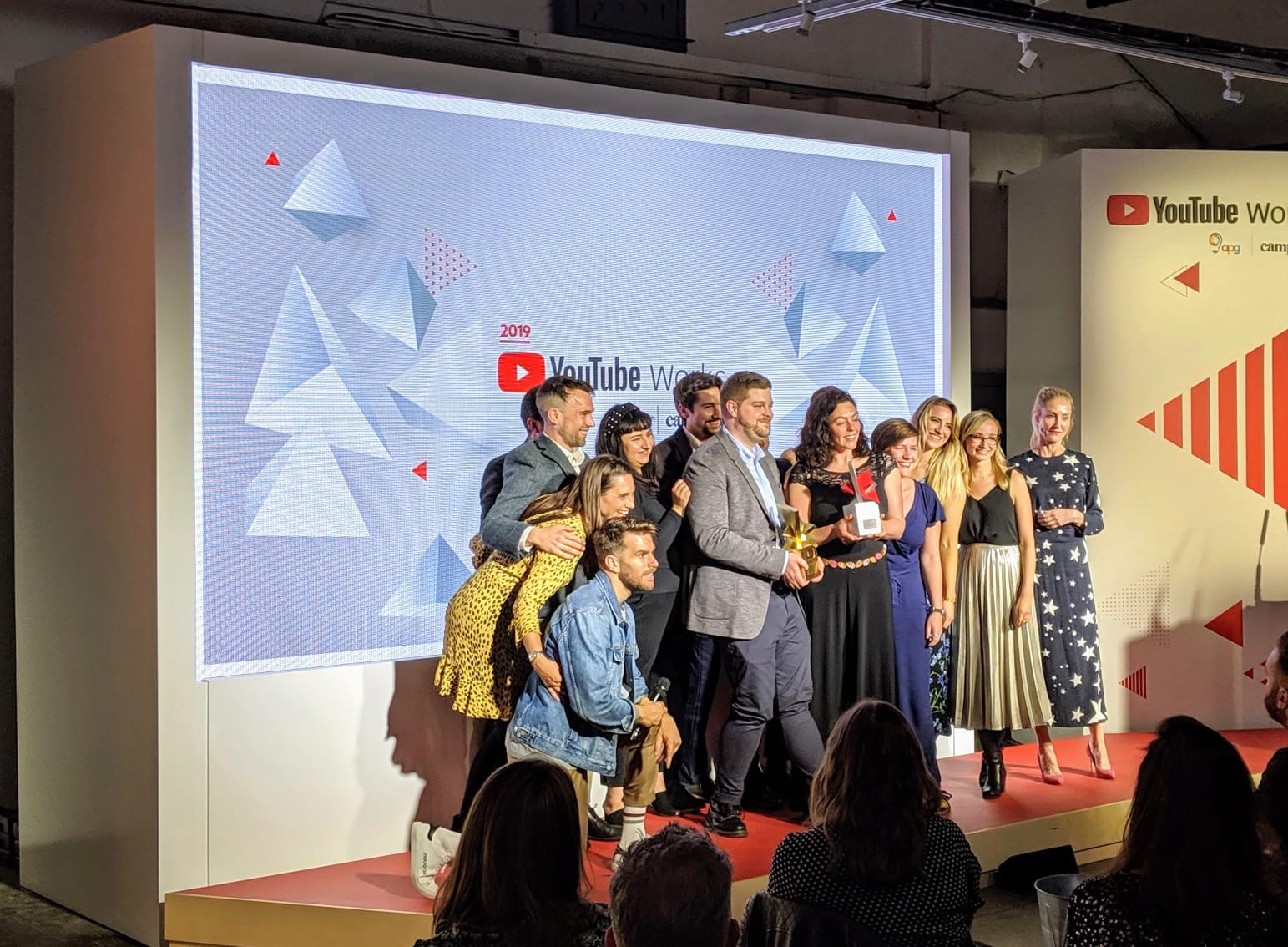
The English Heritage content marketing team, together with Kathy Hipperson and Annie Gray, at the YouTube Works award ceremony, June 2019

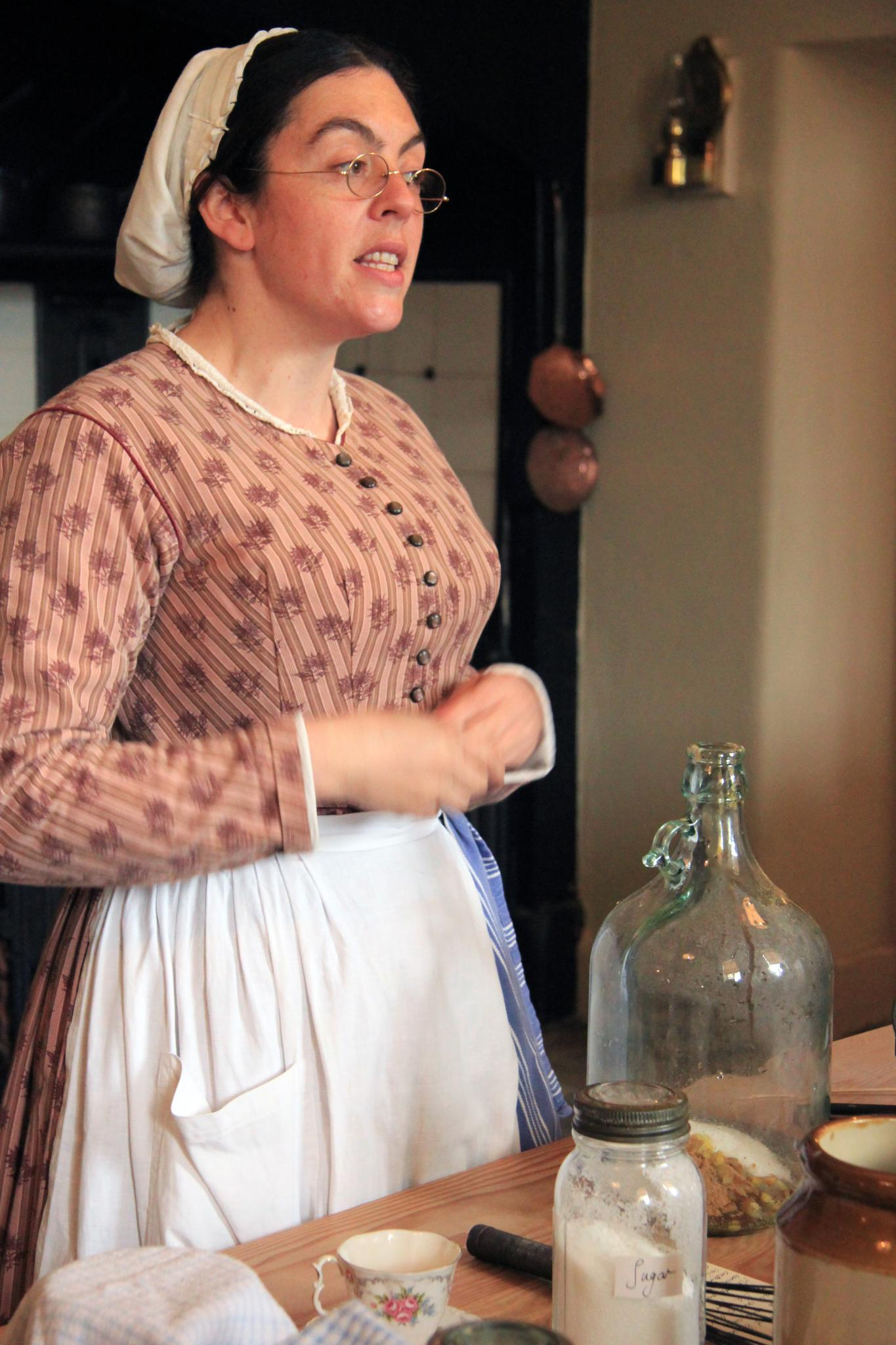
Kathy Hipperson playing Avis Crocombe

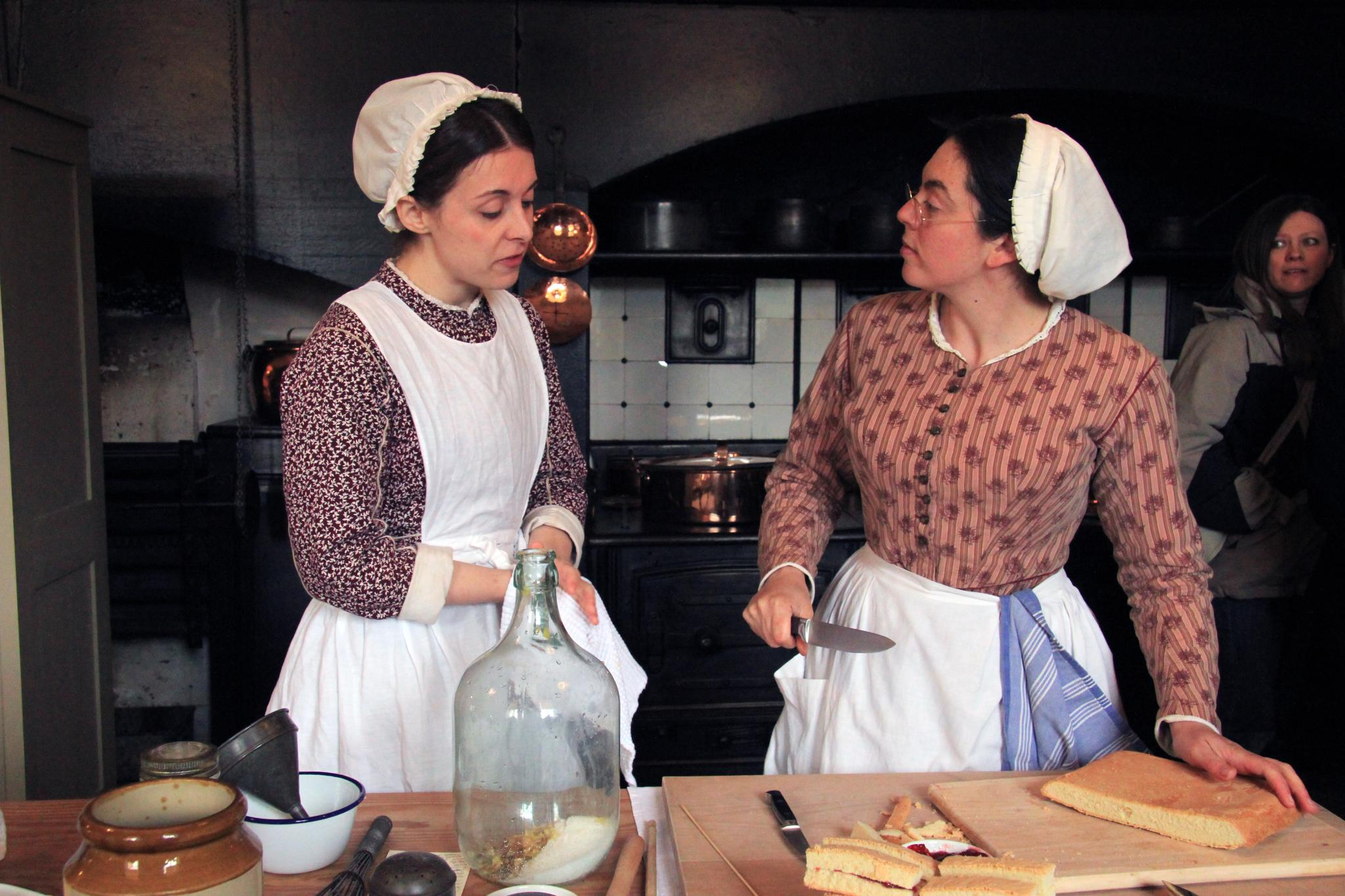
Kathy Hipperson and assistant

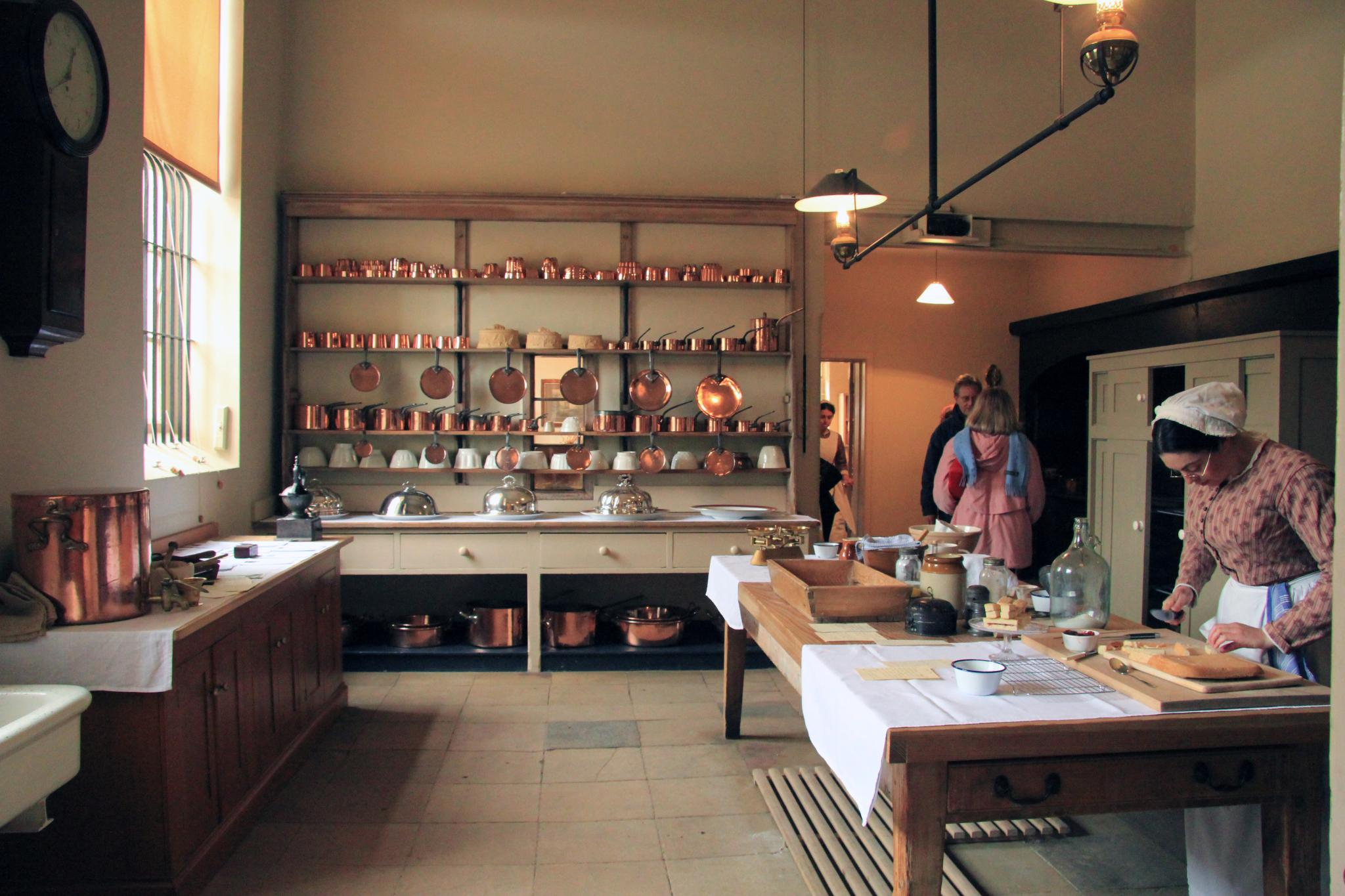
Kitchens at Audley End House seen in 2012
