= Georgiana Hill =

British historian and women's rights activist (1858–1924)

Georgiana Hill (8 December 1858 – 29 March 1924), was a British social historian, journalist, and women's rights activist.

== Early life ==
Georgiana Hill was born on 8 December 1858, at 9 Mount View, Lambeth, London, the younger of two daughters of George Hill (1822–1897), a master printer, journalist, and newspaper publisher, and his wife, Emily, née Kitson (1815–1894). George Hill was the founder and editor of the local newspaper, the Westminster and Lambeth Gazette, and was a local political activist, including being the representative for Lambeth on the Metropolitan Board of Works.

== Career ==
Neither Hill nor her older sister, Emily Hill (1851/52–1936) ever married, and they worked and lived together until Hill's death in 1924.

Georgiana and Emily Hill were active in an extensive array of social and philanthropic movements, and actively participated in their father's business. They worked as journalist, and also trained other women in composition, proof-reading, journalism, and such like connected matters. Georgiana and Emily wrote the "Woman's Page" in the Westminster and Lambeth Gazette up until their father's retirement in 1891.

Georgiana published A History of English Dress from the Saxon Period to the Present Day in 1893, a "classic example of the cultural and social history publications characteristic of late nineteenth-century amateur women historians", in which she consistently criticised fashions that were uncomfortable, ostentatious or impractical.

In 1896 Georgiana published Women in English Life from Medieval to Modern Times, which examined the experience of women of all classes over time, within an overall liberal and progressive viewpoint. However, she noted that there was "no unvarying progress from age to age", and that there were losses as well as gains over time.

Georgiana was a suffragist. She has been called a "successor to the Strickland sisters and Mary Anne Everett Green, and the foremother of Alice Clark and Eileen Power".

=== Publications ===
- A History of English Dress from the Saxon Period to the Present Day (1893)
- Women in English Life from Medieval to Modern Times (1896)

== Later life ==
Hill died on 29 March 1924, at her home at 3 Blenkarne Road, Wandsworth, London, of pneumonia. She is buried in Wandsworth Cemetery.

== Identity ==
For much of the twentieth century Hill's identity and work was conflated with that of her namesake, Georgiana Hill, the cookery book writer: the historian Joan Thirsk, in her introduction to Women in English Society, 1500–1800 (1985) discusses the social historian as having "extraordinary success as an author [that] started with her cookery books which sold cheaply ... and in very large numbers". In 2014 the historian Rachel Rich wrote the entry for Georgiana Hill (the cookery book writer) for inclusion in the Dictionary of National Biography.
