= The Kitchen Cabinet =

BBC radio program

The Kitchen Cabinet is a BBC Radio 4 programme hosted by Jay Rayner in which members of the public can put questions to a panel of experts about food and cooking.

== History ==
The programme was first broadcast on 7 Feb 2012; as of November 2025 it is in its 50th series. It is a Somethin' Else production.

== Format ==
The show has a format similar to that of the long established Gardeners Question Time, coming from public venues at interesting 'food locations' in Britain in front of an audience. Panel members have included the food historian Professor Peter Barham, James 'Jocky' Petrie, the former Head of Creative Development for Heston Blumenthal and food writer Tim Hayward.

Annie Gray is a regular member of the panel, as the resident food historian. She wrote the official publication accompanying the series in 2021, which includes a foreword from Jay Rayner.
