= Georgiana Hill (cookery book writer) =

English cookery writer (1825–1903)

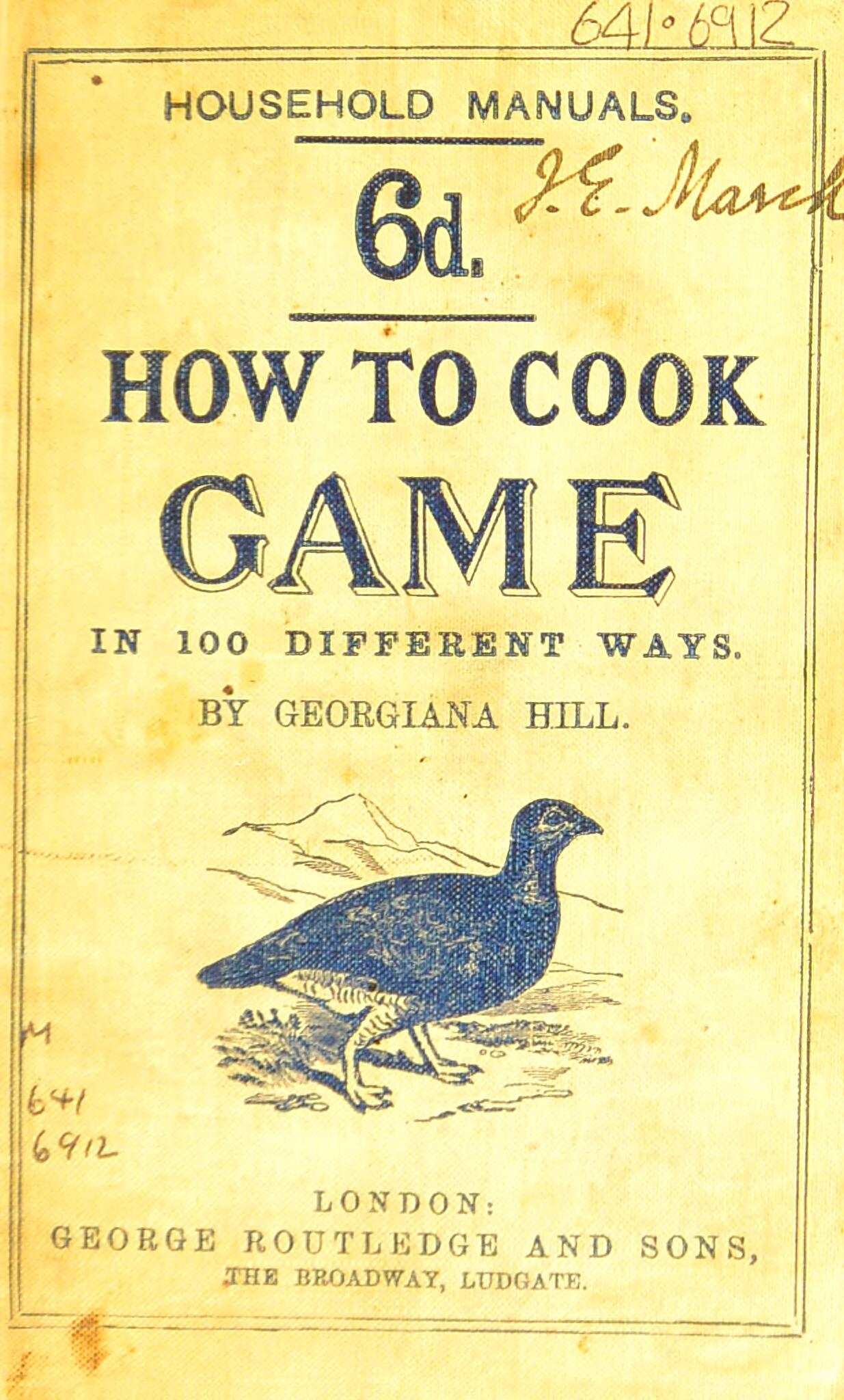
The cover page of Hill's 1867 work How to Cook Game

Georgina Hill (14 July 1825 – 22 July 1903) was an English cookery book writer who wrote at least twenty-three works. She was born in Kingsdown, Bristol before moving to Tadley, Hampshire in the 1850s. She wrote her first cookery book, The Gourmet's Guide to Rabbit Cooking, there in 1859. Within a year she was writing for the Routledge Household Manuals series of books; her final work was published in 1870. She produced several books that specialised in an ingredient, type of food, method of cooking or meal. Her books appear to have sold well, and were advertised in the UK, India and the US. The recipes assume a prior knowledge of cookery. Her complete canon of publications has been favourably compared with the compendium-style cookery books that were produced in Victorian England, particularly Isabella Beeton's 1861 work A Book of Household Management.

Hill's 1862 work Everybody's Pudding Book was republished as A Year of Victorian Puddings in 2012. For much of the twentieth century Hill's identity and work were mistakenly conflated with those of her namesake, Georgiana Hill, the social historian, journalist and women's rights activist.

== Life ==
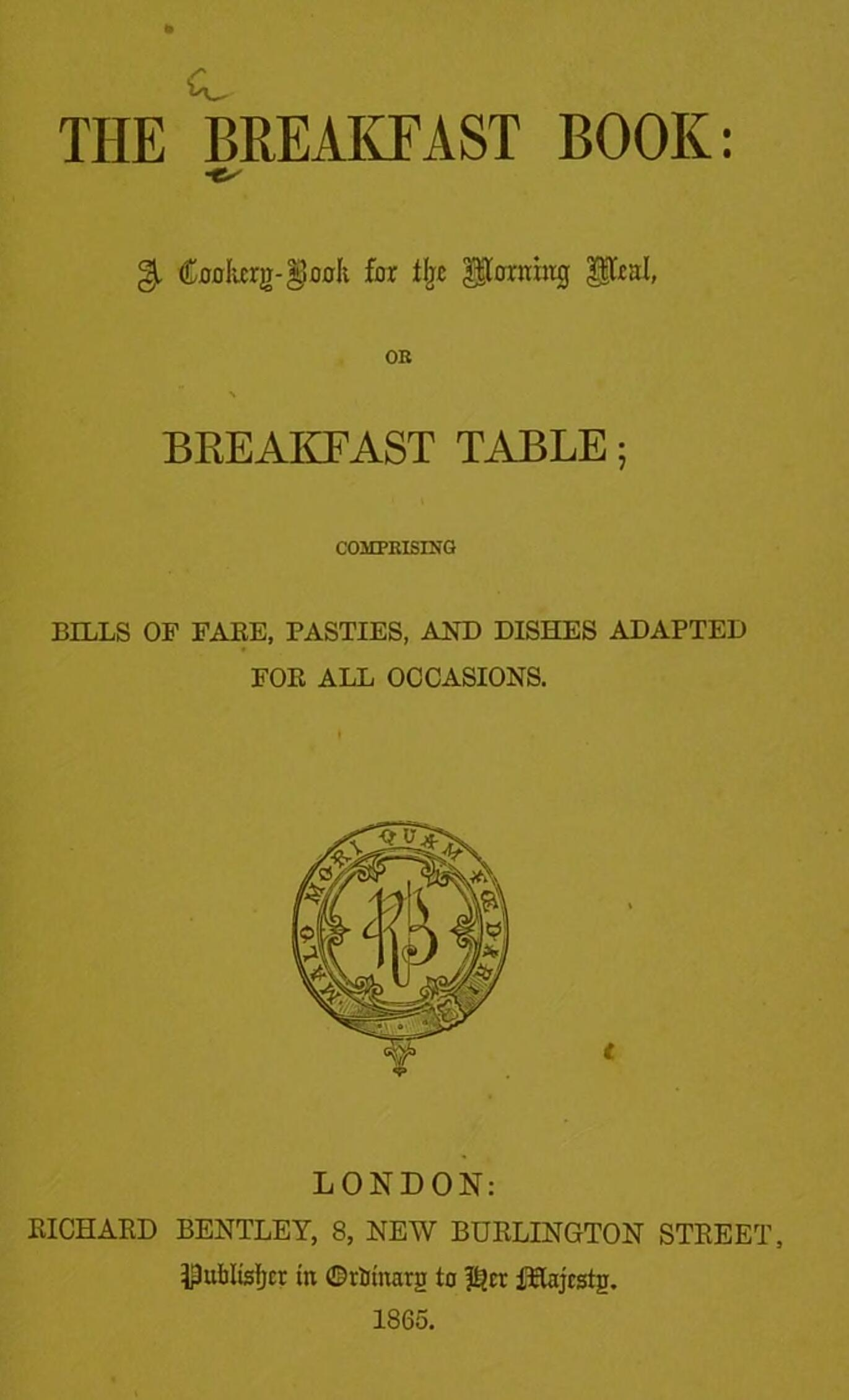
The title page of Hill's 1865 work The Breakfast Book

Georgina Hill was born on 14 July 1825 in Kingsdown, Bristol; her father was George Hill, a civil engineer and her mother was Sophia Pitson (née Edgar). She was the couple's second daughter. Little is known about Hill's early life, although in 1841 the family were living in Weston-super-Mare, Somerset. Her mother died in the 1840s. In 1851 Hill was living in Exmouth, Devon, and teaching languages; her sister, Sophie, also lived in the town, and taught singing. Hill's father died in the 1850s and at some point in that decade both sisters moved to Browning Hill, near Tadley, Hampshire. They both remained unmarried.

Rachel Rich, Hill's biographer, considers it a possibility that Hill may have worked as a housekeeper at the rectory in Baughurst, which is near Browning Hill. Several of Hill's recipes refer to the rectory, and one of her contracts with the publishers Routledge was witnessed by David Williams, the rector of Baughurst, which suggest she may have worked there. (Note: Hill provides the name of the recipe for "Lapereau Enragé as at Baughurst Rectory" as one example.) In 1859 Hill wrote her first cookery book, The Gourmet's Guide to Rabbit Cooking, which was published under the pseudonym "An Old Epicure"; her final work was in 1870.

By 1871 Hill was employed as a ward sister at Guy's Hospital, London, but returned to Browning Hill to live with her sister a few years later. One of the census returns refers to her profession as a "professor of languages". She died at Browning Hill on 22 July 1903.

== Works ==
Hill's first work, The Gourmet's Guide to Rabbit Cooking (1859), divides the recipes by methods of preparation, and comprises rabbit prepared boiled, roast, baked, in pies, puddings, soups, curried, broiled, fried, fricasseed, stewed, served cold and warmed. (Note: The pages covered by the recipes are: boiled (pages 17–20), roast (pages 21–26), baked (pages 26–33), in pies (pages 34–37), puddings (pages 38–41), soups (pages 41–45), curried (pages 45–47), broiled (pages 47–51), fried (pages 52–58), fricasseed (page 59), stewed (pages 60–71), served cold (pages 72–73) and warmed (pages 73–79).) She wrote in the preface:

And why should I not, as a good gastronomer, publish some of my experiences in the 'social science' of cookery? ... Nor do I deem it to be a derogation of my dignity to take up my pen in favour of so gracious a subject ... So, then, am I right ... [to] put on armour (my apron) for the advancement of the ars coquinari?

The Gourmet's Guide to Rabbit Cooking was reviewed in The Globe and described as "a curiosity in its way" as it taught cooks "how to make cheap dishes that are not nasty".

In 1860 Hill began writing for Routledge's Household Manuals series of books. These were cheaply produced with soft covers and on thin paper and cost sixpence. (Note: 6d in 1860 is approximately equivalent to £3 in 2025, according to calculations based on the Consumer Price Index measure of inflation.) The first book she wrote in the series was The Cook's Own Book, a volume of 64 pages. It was described in the London City Press as having "the double merit of being cheap and simple; so simple that the most unskilful in the culinary art may ... serve up a savoury meal to please the most fastidious palate". The reviewer for the Leeds Intelligencer thought the work would be beneficial to those "who wish to instruct the ignorant in a good system of cookery", as the work "is not a mere collection of 'receipts', but it is a short treatise on cookery, in which practical instructions of great value are given". (Note: The common name for a recipe was, at the time, "receipt".) The Lincoln, Rutland and Stamford Mercury also reviewed the work:

... Mrs. Georgiana Hill thought that there was room for another small brochure for the use of the cuisine; and accordingly she has written one entitled The Cook's Own Book, a Manual of Cookery for the Kitchen and the Cottage (Routledge and Co.), which, conveying information through the medium of question and answer, most certainly will accomplish her object—that of impressing on the memory of young practitioners the more important rules and directions necessary to be observed to order to render inapplicable the old aphorism that "the devil sends cooks". Housekeepers will undoubtedly find Mrs Hill's instructions of great value.

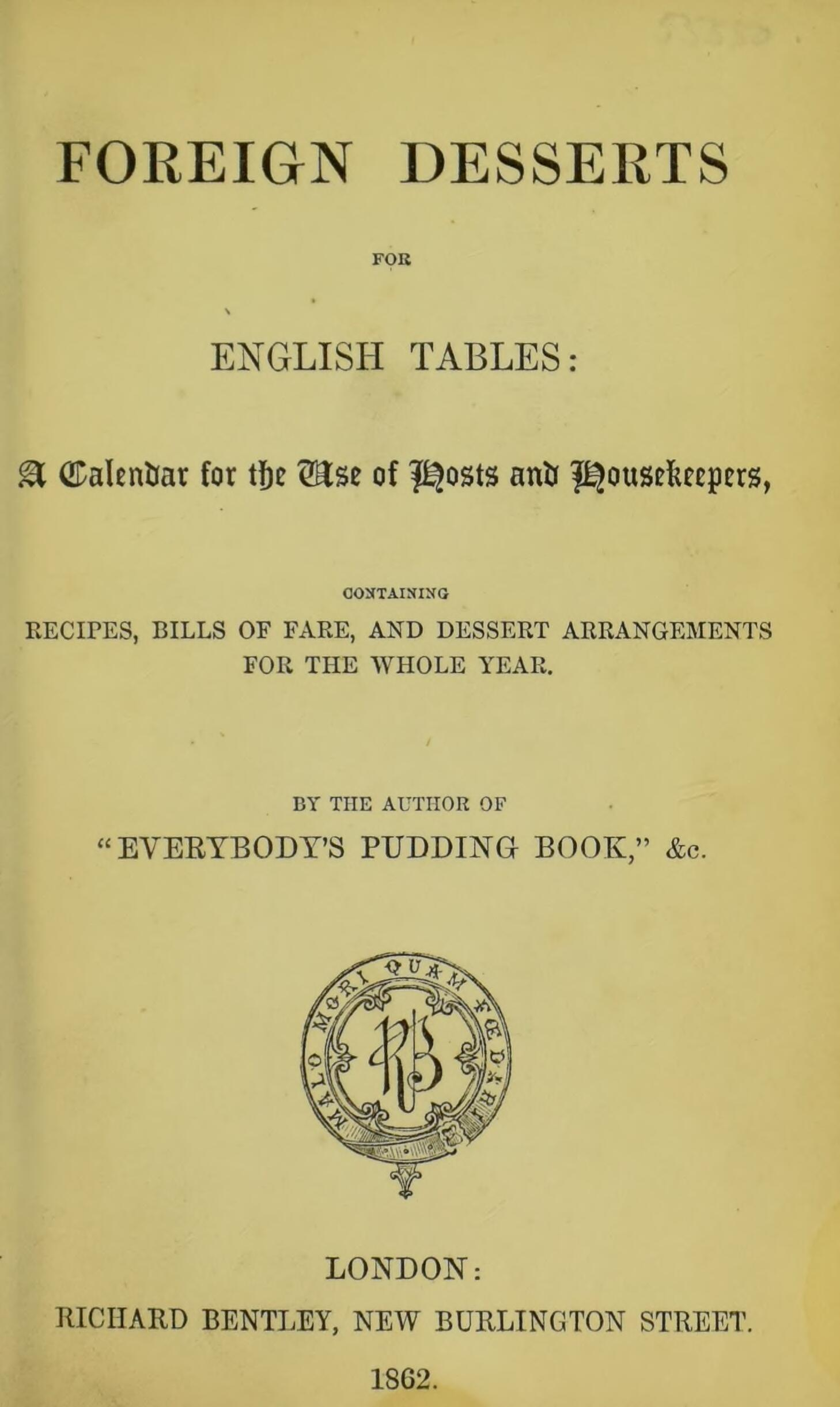
The title page of Hill's 1862 work Foreign Desserts for English Tables

Hill wrote extensively for the Household Manuals series, producing a series of works that specialised in an ingredient, such as apples, potatoes, fish, game, vegetables or onions; type of food, such as cakes, salads, soups and sweet and savoury puddings; method of cooking, including stew, hash, curry, pickles and preserves; or whole meals, such as breakfast. After she stayed at the house of an old lady who had apple puddings for six months of the year, and then changed to gooseberry desserts for the other half of the year, Hill wrote Everybody's Pudding Book in 1862. She structured the work into monthly sections rather than type or style of the dish. Each chapter provides information about the month in question, and the best dishes to prepare with the seasonal produce; for example, in the chapter for April she writes "Spring is coming to us once again; already the verdant fields rejoice our sight, and enrich the quality of the milk, cream and butter which lend perfection to those puddings that we presently enjoy".

Hill's books appear to have sold well, and were advertised for sale in the UK, the US and India; in 1869 an American publication comprising four of her works was published under the name How to Cook Potatoes, Apples, Eggs and Fish. Four Hundred Different Ways. Many of her works show the influence of European cuisines on the English repertoire; recipes for French, Spanish and Italian dishes are included. Although it is not known if she travelled to gain the experience of the dishes, or read widely, in the 1863 work Everybody's Pudding Book, Hill relates that "I first tasted this dish in Tuscany on the 27th April, 1850, and I have commemorated the event by having a like pudding annually on that day ever since". Rich notes that the books show the hand of an educated and erudite writer who understood French and Italian, could write about the apple in classical mythology and also about modern manners.

For the 1865 work, The Breakfast Book, Hill included sample menus at the end, divided by the season. The book was described in The Cheltenham Journal and Gloucestershire Gazette as "a pretty extensive collection of receipts for the preparing of the many luxuries of the table which either fastidious or plain people regard as necessary to the proper enjoyment of the morning meal".

Hill wrote thirteen entries in the Routledge series and a reader needed to spend 6 shillings 6d to buy them all. (Note: 6 shillings 6d in 1860 is approximately equivalent to £35 in 2025, according to calculations based on the Consumer Price Index measure of inflation.) She was paid for each title she wrote, but did not receive any additional payments for subsequent editions or reprints, unlike other cookery book writers of the time. The publisher Richard Bentley paid Miss Renney £21 for the first edition of 3,000 copies of her 1863 work What to do with Cold Mutton and £5 5 shillings for each subsequent thousand copies; Bentley paid Hill £20 in 1862 for Everybody's Pudding Book. (Note: £21 in 1863 is approximately equivalent to £2,281 in 2025; £5 5 shillings in 1863 is approximately equivalent to £552 in 2025; and £20 in 1862 is approximately equivalent to £2,103 in 2025 according to calculations based on the Consumer Price Index measure of inflation.)

Hill's style of writing recipes assumed the cook had some prior knowledge of cooking, and some judgement for things such as the amounts that were needed for many of the ingredients or how to present a dish at a table and with what accompaniments. In discussing Hill's approach to recipe presentation, Rich gives as an example the instructions for plain curried rabbit, which have no list of ingredients, just simple instructions:

Cut up a young rabbit, and roll it well in a mixture of two ounces of flour and half an ounce of curry-powder; fry it till it begins to turn brown, when add a little white wine, and enough good stock to cover it. Let it simmer for half an hour, and serve either with sippets of fried bread, or a rim of plain boiled rice. (Note: A "sippet" is defined as "A small piece of toasted or fried bread, usually served in soup or broth, or with meat, or used for dipping into gravy, etc".)

== Identity and legacy ==
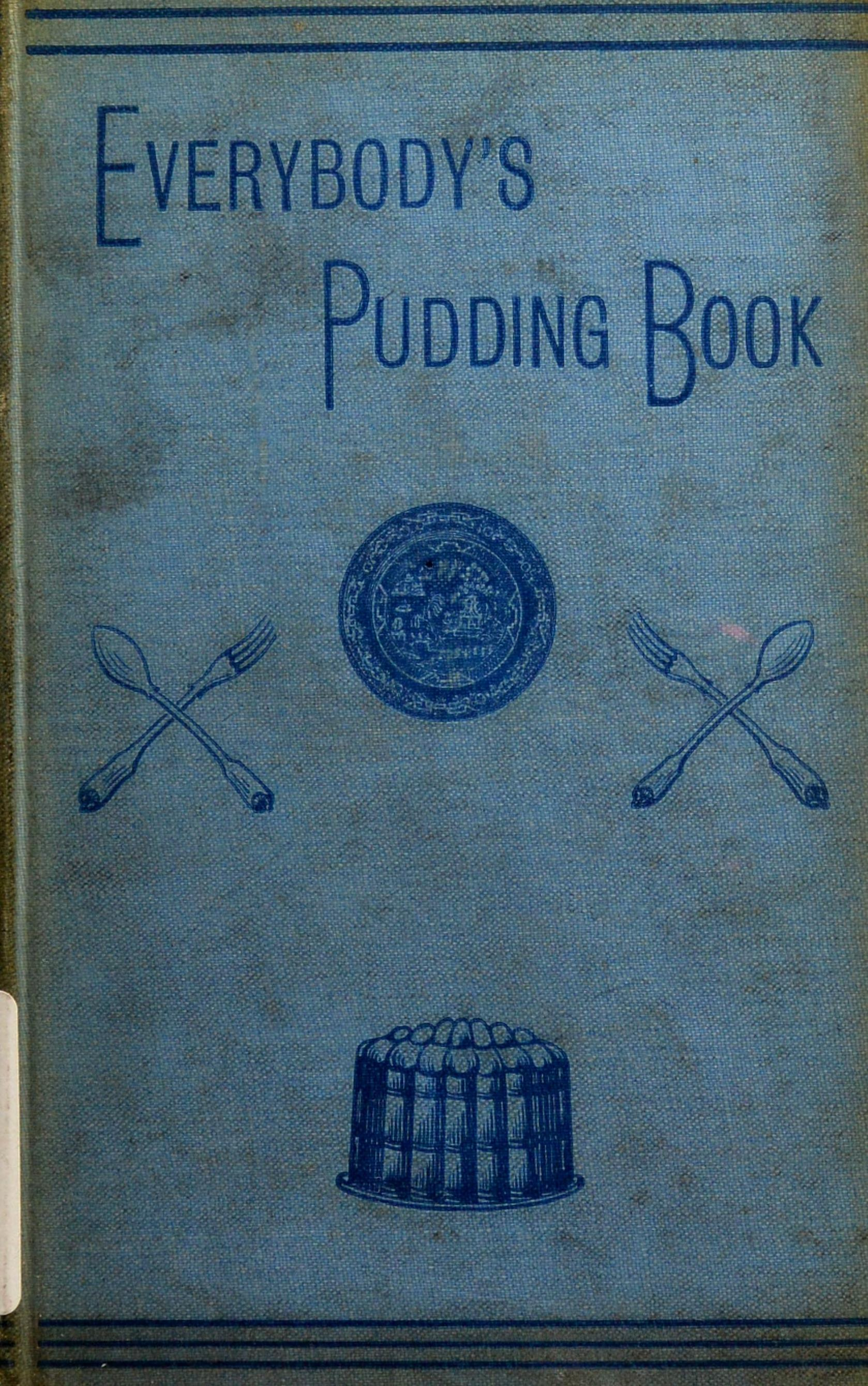
Cover of Everybody's Pudding Book (1863)

For much of the twentieth century Hill's identity and work were mistakenly conflated with those of her namesake, Georgiana Hill, the social historian, journalist and women's rights activist. The historian Joan Thirsk, in her introduction to Women in English Society, 1500–1800 (1985) discusses the social historian as having "extraordinary success as an author [that] started with her cookery books which sold cheaply ... and in very large numbers". The food historian Sarah Freeman, in her history of British food Mutton and Oysters, describes how Hill "desisted from writing for twenty years; then in the '90s, she published a history of fashion". In some cases Hill's name was confused with her place of residence, and she is named Browning Hill. In 2012 Mark Curthoys, the commissioning editor at the Oxford Dictionary of National Biography undertook research that showed that the cookery book writer was a different person to the historian of the same name. He asked the historian Rachel Rich to write the biography for Georgiana Hill (the cookery book writer) for inclusion in the Dictionary of National Biography, which was published in 2014.

Rich observes that Hill's approach was that of the "specialist and expert", focusing on an individual ingredient or course, when the style of contemporary cookery book publishing was towards that of the broader compendium. For the latter type of work, Rich gives the example of Isabella Beeton's 1861 all-encompassing publication A Book of Household Management. Freeman considers that the canon of Hill's work taken together is an equivalent to the compendium.

Hill's work has been used as a source in several works of social and food history, and her recipes and advice still appear in such works. (Note: For example in Lucy Madden's The Potato Year, Laura Shapiro's What She Ate: Six Remarkable Women and the Food that Tells Their Stories, Annie Gray's How to Cook the Victorian Way with Mrs Crocombe, Linda and Fred Griffith's Nuts, Heather Arndt Anderson's Breakfast: A History, Sandra Oliver's Saltwater Foodways: New Englanders and their Food, at Sea and Ashore, in the Nineteenth Century, Jacqueline B. Williams's Wagon Wheel Kitchens, Sarah Freeman's Best of Modern British Cookery, and Regula Ysewijn's Pride and Pudding: The History of British Puddings Savoury and Sweet.) Everybody's Pudding Book was republished as A Year of Victorian Puddings in 2012.

== Publications ==
Books by Georgiana Hill
Title	Publisher	Year	Pages	OCLC or ISBN
The Gourmet's Guide to Rabbit Cooking, in One Hundred and Twenty-Four Dishes	W. Kent and Co.	1859	32	OCLC 2101774
The Cook's Own Book: A Manual of Cookery for the Kitchen and Cottage	Routledge, Warne, & Routledge	1860	64	OCLC 430903223
Foreign Desserts for English Tables: A Calendar for the Use of Hosts and Housekeepers	Richard Bentley	1862	160	OCLC 560427684
Everybody's Pudding Book	Richard Bentley	1862	185	OCLC 558996253
Foreign Desserts for English Tables	Richard Bentley	1862	160	OCLC 560427684
The Lady's Dessert Book: A Calendar for the Use of Hosts and Housekeepers	Richard Bentley	1863	160	OCLC 222001726
How to Cook Apples, Shown in a Hundred Different Ways of Dressing that Fruit	George Routledge and Sons	1867	63	OCLC 49249831
The Breakfast Book	Richard Bentley	1865	139	OCLC 560427632
Upwards of a Hundred Ways of Dressing and Serving Potatoes	George Routledge and Sons	1866	64	OCLC 35447376
How to Cook or Serve Eggs: In a Hundred Different Ways	George Routledge and Sons	1866	63	OCLC 920661501
How to Cook Fish in Upwards of a Hundred Different Ways	George Routledge and Sons	1866	64	OCLC 4549603
How to Cook Game in a Hundred Different Ways	George Routledge and Sons	1867	64	OCLC 1880808
Cakes: How to Make Them a Hundred Different Ways	George Routledge and Sons	1868	64	OCLC 1181035339
Onions Dressed and Served in a Hundred Different Ways	George Routledge and Sons	1867	55	OCLC 19456098
How to Dress Salads; Shown in a Hundred Different Ways	George Routledge and Sons	1867	63	OCLC 1079001226
How to Preserve Fruit in a Hundred Different Ways	George Routledge and Sons	1867	64	OCLC 35447285
Soups: How to Make them in More than a Hundred Different Ways	George Routledge and Sons	1867	82	OCLC 999612926
How to Cook Vegetables in One Hundred Different Ways	George Routledge and Sons	1868	63	OCLC 1065393896
How to Stew, Hash and Curry Cold Meat and Fish in a Hundred Different Ways	George Routledge and Sons	1868	64	OCLC 660081399
How to Cook Potatoes, Apples, Eggs and Fish. Four Hundred Different Ways	Dick & Fitzgerald, New York	1869	178	OCLC 38731314
Pickles: How to Make Them in a Hundred Different Ways	George Routledge and Sons	1870	214	OCLC 560427850
How to Cook Meat, Fruit and Sweet Puddings, in Upwards of Two Hundred Ways	George Routledge and Sons	1870	64	OCLC 441229334
A Year of Victorian Puddings: Traditional Tarts, Pies and Puddings for Every Day of the Year	Macmillan	2012	186	ISBN 978-0-2307-6782-9

== Notes and references ==
=== Sources ===
==== Books ====
- Arndt Anderson, Heather (2013). Breakfast: A History. Lanham, Maryland: AltaMira Press. ISBN 978-0-7591-2163-8.
- Freeman, Sarah (1989). Mutton and Oysters: The Victorians and Their Food. London: Gollancz. ISBN 978-0-575-03151-7.
- Freeman, Sarah (2008). Best of Modern British Cookery. London: Grub Street. ISBN 978-1-9065-0219-5.
- Gray, Annie (2020). How to Cook the Victorian Way with Mrs Crocombe. London: English Heritage. ISBN 978-1-9109-0742-9.
- Griffith, Linda; Griffith, Fred (2003). Nuts: Recipes from Around the World that Feature Nature's Perfect Ingredient. New York: St. Martin's Press. ISBN 978-0-3122-6624-0.
- Hill, Georgiana (1859). The Gourmet's Guide to Rabbit Cooking, in One Hundred and Twenty-Four Dishes. London: W. Kent & Co. OCLC 2101774.
- Hill, Georgiana (1887) [1862]. Everybody's Pudding Book. London: Richard Bentley & Son. OCLC 560427666.
- Hill, Georgiana (1863). Everybody's Pudding Book: Or, Puddings, Tarts, Etc., in their Proper Season, for all the Year Round. London: Richard Bentley. OCLC 558996253.
- Madden, Lucy (2015). The Potato Year. Cork: Mercier Press. ISBN 978-1-7811-7311-4.
- Oliver, Sandra (1995). Saltwater Foodways: New Englanders and their Food, at Sea and Ashore, in the Nineteenth Century. Mystic, Connecticut: Mystic Seaport Museum. ISBN 978-0-9133-7272-2.
- Shapiro, Laura (2018). What She Ate: Six Remarkable Women and the Food that Tells Their Stories. London: 4th Estate. ISBN 978-0-0082-8107-6.
- Thirsk, Joan (1985). "Introduction". In Prior, Mary (ed.). Women in English Society, 1500–1800. London: Routledge. pp. xiv–xxviii. ISBN 978-0-4150-7901-3.
- Williams, Jacqueline B. (1993). Wagon Wheel Kitchens. University Press of Kansas. ISBN 978-0-7006-0610-8.
- Ysewijn, Regula (2016). Pride and Pudding: The History of British Puddings Savoury and Sweet. Sydney: Murdoch Books. ISBN 978-1-7433-6738-4.

==== Journals and magazines ====
- Baker, Sue (20 July 2012). "Food & Drink Category Preview – August to January 2013". The Bookseller. pp. 34–40.
- Rich, Rachel (2019). "Georgiana Hill's Household Manual Series: How to Cook Dinner in a Hundred Different Ways". Victorian Review. 45 (2): 200–204. doi:10.1353/vcr.2019.0050. JSTOR 26953060.
- Rich, Rachel (May 2015). "'If You Desire to Enjoy Life, Avoid Unpunctual People'". Cultural and Social History. 12 (1): 95–112. doi:10.2752/147800415X14135484867225.
- Rich, Rachel (14 July 2020). "Cookbook Writers and Recipe Readers: Georgiana Hill, Isabella Beeton and Victorian Domesticity". Journal of Victorian Culture. 25 (3): 408–423. doi:10.1093/jvcult/vcaa007.

==== News ====
- "Good Books". London City Press. 21 July 1860. p. 6.
- "Literary Extracts, &c". The Lincoln, Rutland and Stamford Mercury. 18 May 1860. p. 6.
- "Literary Notices". Cheltenham Journal and Gloucestershire Gazette. 16 December 1865. p. 6.
- "Literature". The Globe. 12 May 1859. p. 1.
- "Literature". Leeds Intelligencer. 12 May 1860. p. 3.

==== Websites ====
- Braithwaite, Carrie (18 September 2014). "Victorian Cookery Writer's Life Revealed for First Time". Leeds Beckett University. Archived from the original on 9 June 2020.
- Clark, Gregory (2023). "The Annual RPI and Average Earnings for Britain, 1209 to Present (New Series)". MeasuringWorth.
- "receipt and recipe". British Library. Archived from the original on 19 February 2020.
- Rich, Rachel (2014). "Hill, Georgiana (1825–1903)". Oxford Dictionary of National Biography (online ed.). Oxford University Press. doi:10.1093/ref:odnb/106198. (Subscription, Wikipedia Library access or UK public library membership required.)
- "sippet". Oxford English Dictionary (online ed.). Oxford University Press. doi:10.1093/OED/7886021872. (Subscription or participating institution membership required.)
