= Tim Hayward =

British food writer, broadcaster and restaurateur

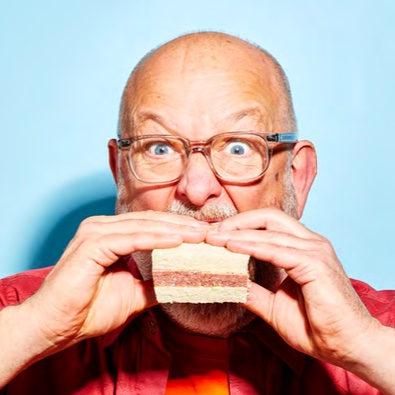
- Hayward in 2022
- Born: 9 July 1963 (age 63); Bristol, England
- Education: Bournemouth and Poole College of Art and Design
- Occupations: Food writer, broadcaster and restaurateur
- Spouse: Alison Wright

Timothy Matthew Hayward (born 9 July 1963 in Bristol) is a British food writer, broadcaster and restaurateur.

== Career ==
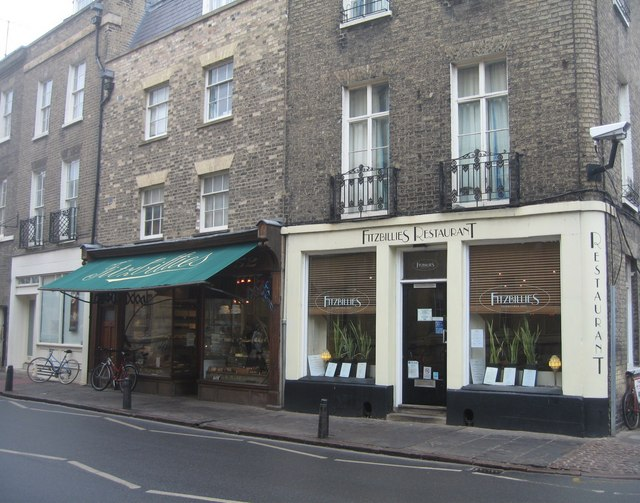
Fitzbillies on Trumpington Street, Cambridge

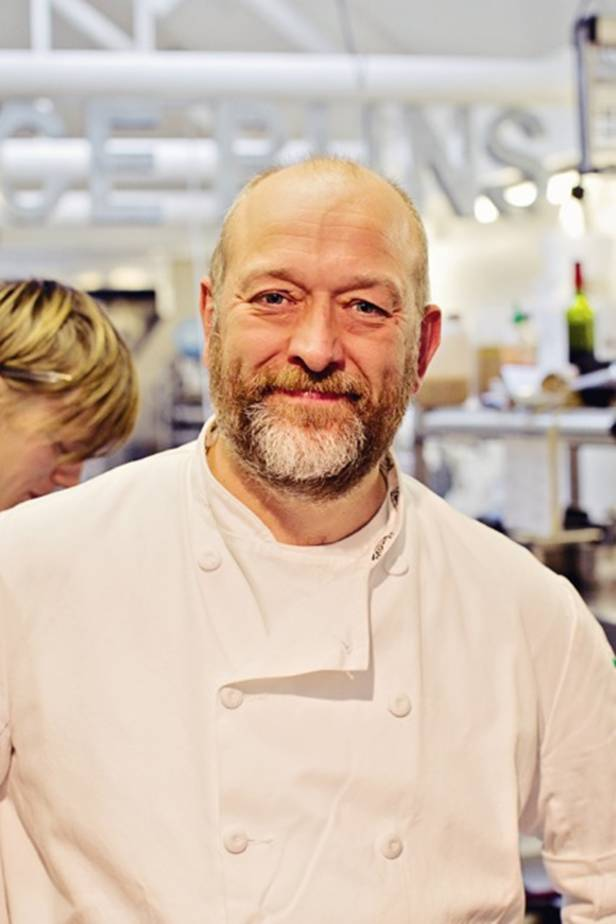
Hayward in 2010

Born in Bristol, Hayward was educated at Bristol Grammar School, New College School, and Bournemouth School. He later attended the Bournemouth and Poole College of Art and Design.

He has published several books including Food DIY (2012) and Knife: The Cult, Craft and Culture of the Cook's Knife (2016) which has now been translated into 8 languages. He is a regular panellist on BBC Radio 4’s The Kitchen Cabinet and has also written and presented several radio documentaries, including the 5-part The Gut Instinct - A Social History (2018), Fungi: The New Frontier (2022) and Bacteria - The Tiny Giants which won Gold in the 2023 New York Festival radio awards.

He is restaurant critic of the FT Magazine, the Financial Times Weekend supplement.

== Personal life ==
Hayward lives in Cambridge where, with his wife Alison Wright, he is proprietor of Fitzbillies, a hundred-year-old bakery, café and local institution.

In November 2020, he was admitted to Addenbrooke's Hospital with COVID-19, subsequently requiring treatment using a ventilator and suffering a pulmonary embolism. He was discharged after a month, having spent 14 days in a coma, and later described himself as "lucky to have lived."

== Publications ==
- 2011–2014 Fire & Knives – Food Quarterly. (Editor)
- 2013 Food DIY: How to Make Your Own Everything
- 2015 The DIY Cook
- 2016 Knife: The Cult, Craft and Culture of the Cook's Knife
- 2017 The Modern Kitchen: Objects That Changed the Way We Cook, Eat and Live
- 2019 Fitzbillies: Stories and Recipes from a 100-year-old Cambridge Bakery (with Alison Wright)
- 2021 Loaf Story: A Love-Letter to Bread, with Recipes
- 2022 Charcuterie From Scratch
- 2024 Steak: The Whole Story

== Awards ==
- 2009 Guild of Food Writers 'New Media Award'.
- 2011 Guild of Food Writers 'Food Broadcast of the Year Award'
- 2012 Guild of Food Writers 'Best Food Magazine’ for Fire & Knives.
- 2012 Guild of Food Writers 'Food Journalist of the Year'
- 2014 Fortnum & Mason Award for 'Best Food Journalism'
- 2014 Guild of Food Writers 'Food Journalist of the Year'
- 2015 Guild of Food Writers ‘Food Journalist of the Year’
- 2018 Guild of Food Writers ‘Restaurant Writer of the Year’
- 2022 Fortnum & Mason Award for 'Best Food Writer'
- 2024 Fortnum & Mason Award for 'Best Restaurant Writer'
- 2024 Guild of Food Writers 'Food Writer of the Year'
