= Henry Singleton (painter) =

English painter

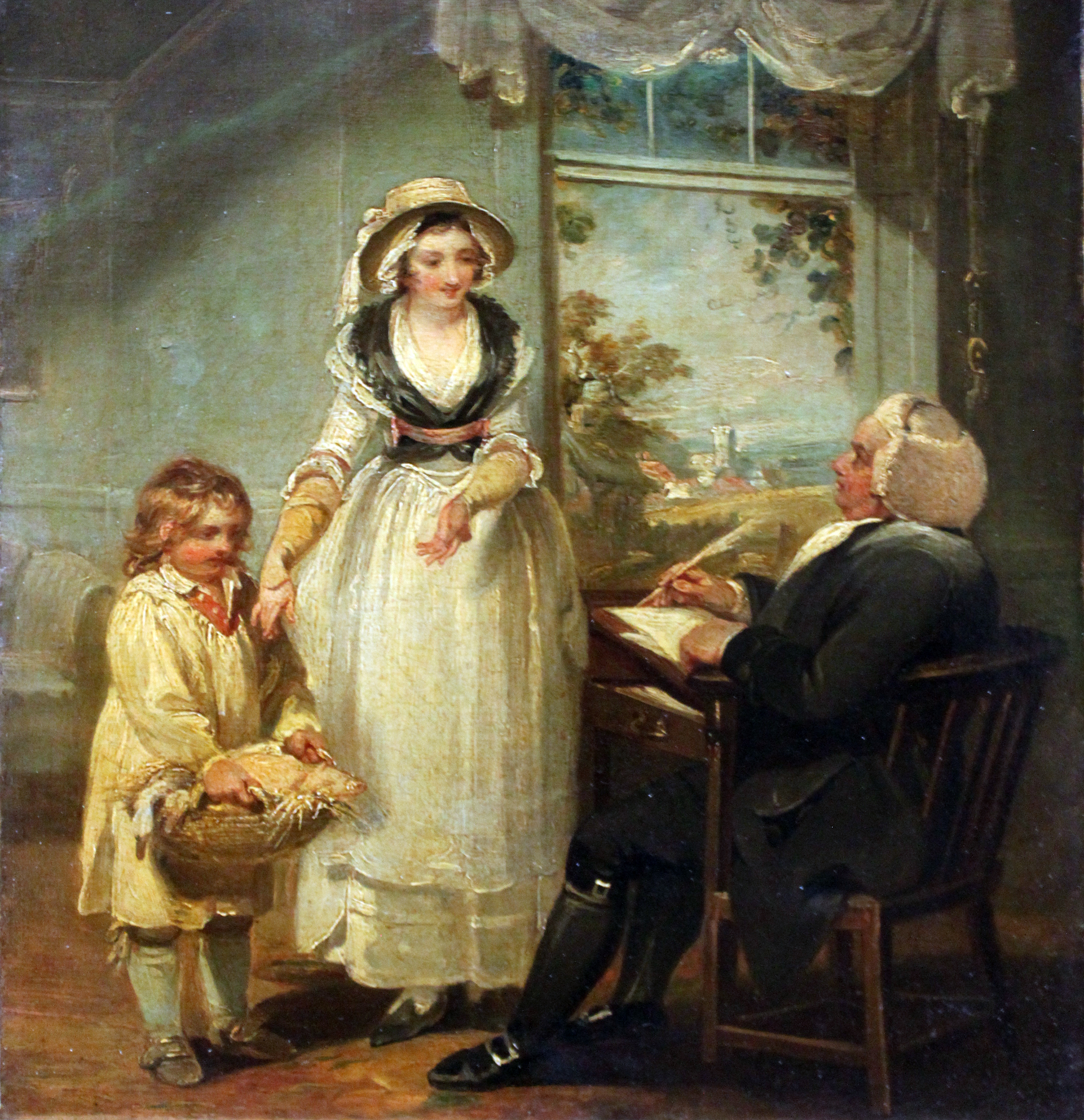
The vicar receives his tithes (1792)

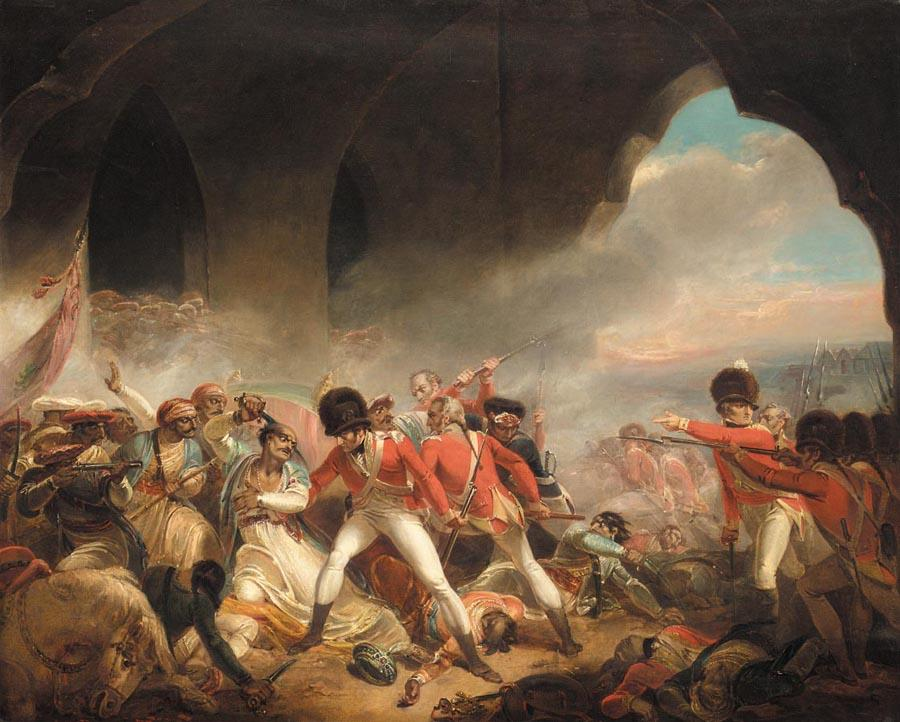
The Last Effort and Fall of Tippoo Sultaun (c. 1800)

Henry Singleton (19 October 1766 – 15 September 1839) was an English painter who specialised in portrait miniatures.

== Family life ==
Henry Singleton was born in London, England, into an artistic family. He was not yet two years old when his father died, so he was raised by his uncle William Singleton (d. 1793), who had studied under the tutelage of Ozias Humphry and painted portraits and miniatures. Another uncle, Joseph Singleton, exhibited at the Royal Academy between 1773 and 1788. Henry’s sisters Maria and Sarah (later Macklarinan) were miniaturists who exhibited at the Royal Academy from 1808 to 1820 and from 1787 to 1806 respectively.

In 1807 Henry married his cousin William Singleton’s only daughter.

Henry Singleton died in London at the age of 72, at the house of a friend at 7 Kensington Gore, and was buried in the church of St Martin-in-the-Fields.

== Work ==
Although Singleton, like his uncles and sister, also painted miniatures, he did not adhere strictly to the genre. He exhibited at the Royal Academy, between 1784 and 1839, approximately 300 works, a large proportion of which were portraits, with scriptural subjects making up much of the remainder. He was for many years the Royal Academy's oldest living exhibitor. His works were also exhibited at the British Institution from 1806 and at the Society of British Artists from 1824 until his death in 1839.

From the age of sixteen, Singleton worked as a professional portraitist. He attended the Royal Academy Schools from the age of seventeen and won the silver medal in 1784. His painting from John Dryden’s ode Alexander’s Feast won the gold medal in 1788. In 1793, Singleton was commissioned by the Royal Academy to paint a group portrait of forty of the academicians. Ironically, he never became a member or an associate of the Academy himself. Early in his career, Singleton was noted for large compositions from the Bible, Shakespeare or contemporary historical events. Although his portrait work was always in demand, he never achieved the great success as a historical painter that his early promise indicated. Lord Nelson, Admiral Vernon, Lord Howe and John "Mad Jack" Fuller are among his portrait sitters. Paul I Granting Liberty to Kościuszko (1797) and The Death of Captain Alexander Hood after Capturing the French 74 "L'Hercule", 21 April 1798 are considered by some to be his best works. Shortly before his death, Singleton completed a series of cabinet pictures to illustrate the works of Shakespeare.

Henry Singleton’s works are currently in the collections of the British Museum, the Victoria and Albert Museum, the National Portrait Gallery (London), the Scottish National Portrait Gallery, Tate Britain, the Ulster Museum, the Royal Institution and the Brighton Art Gallery.

== Gallery ==
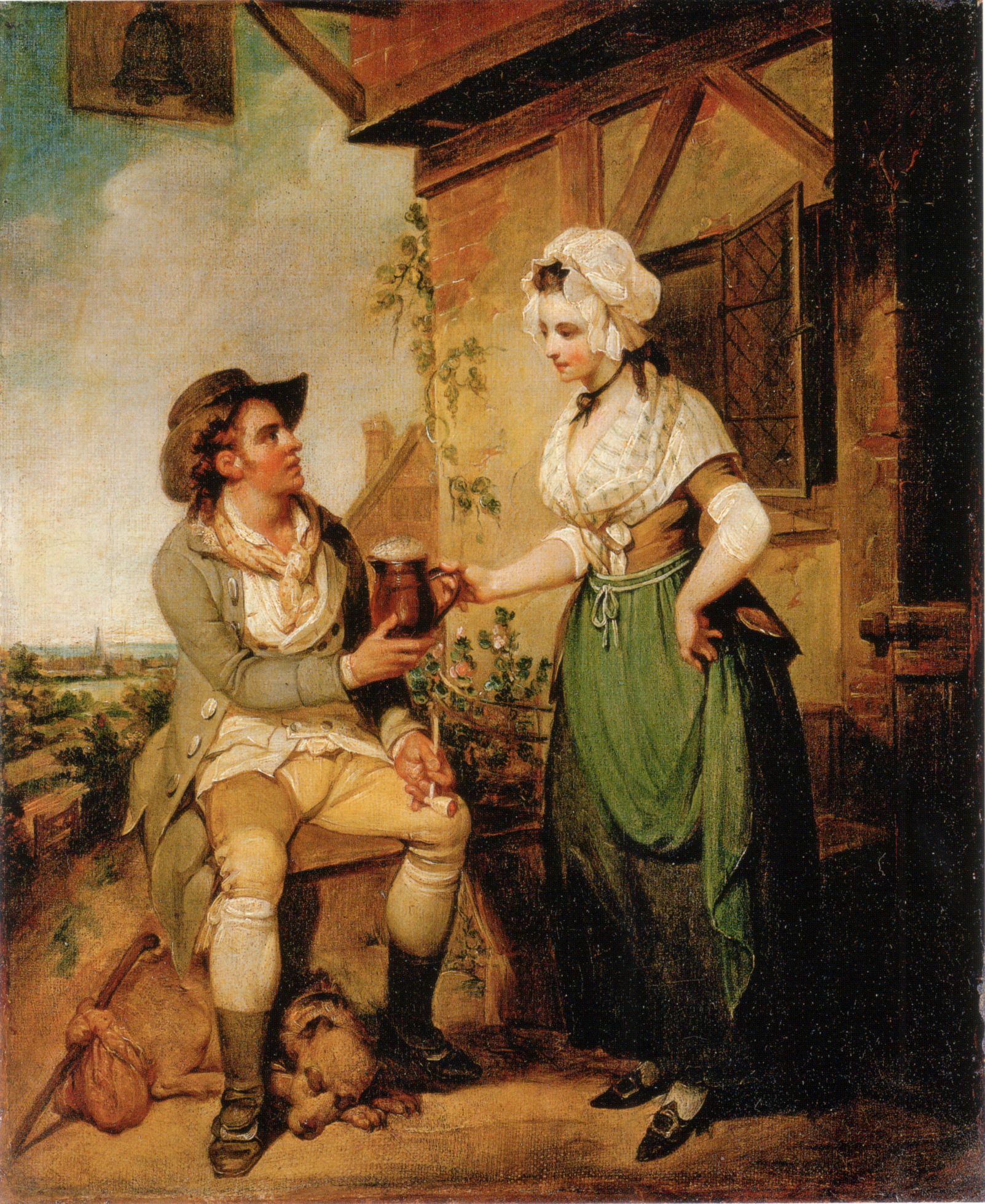
The Ale-House Door, c. 1790

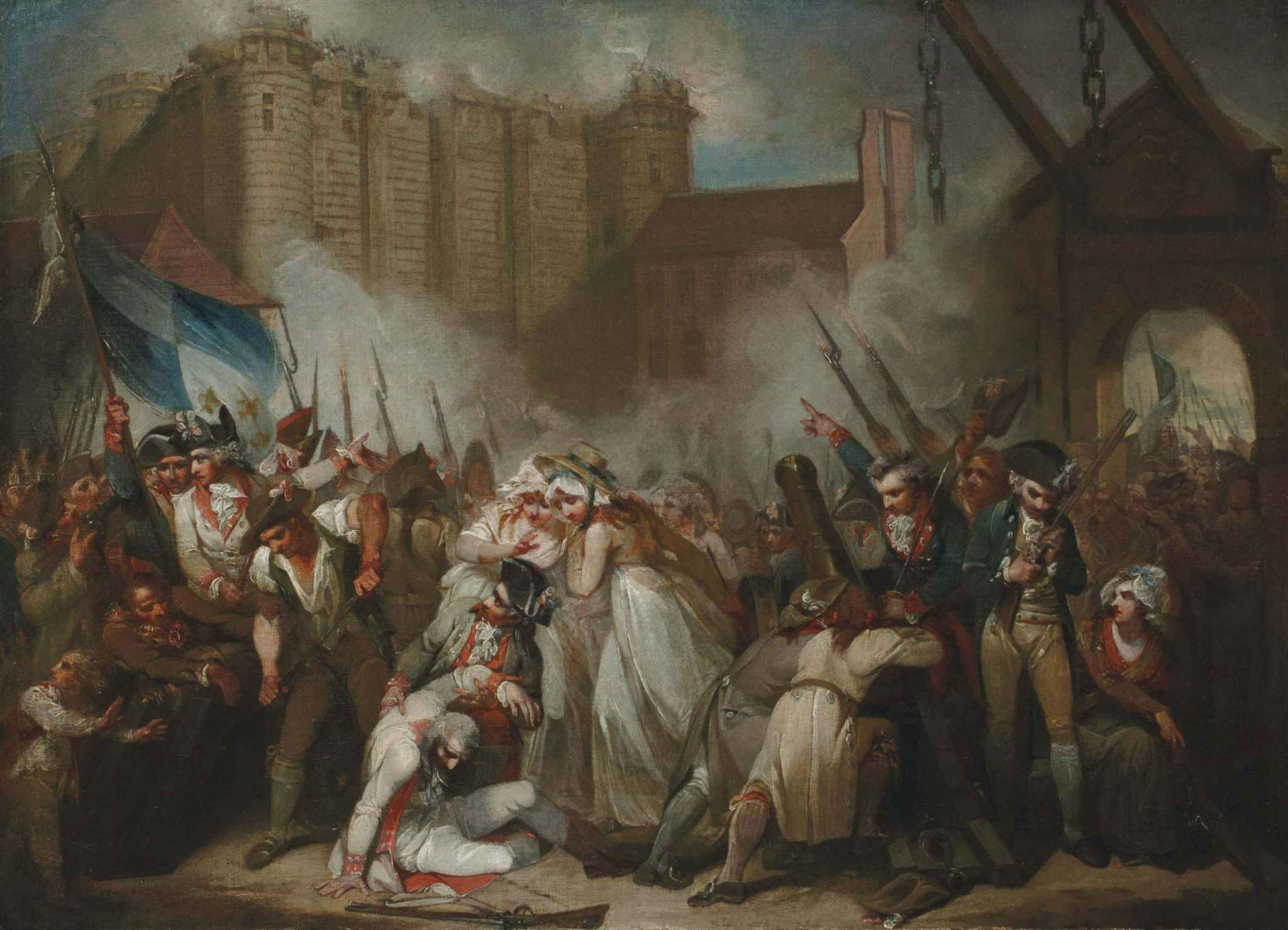
The Storming of the Bastille , c.1790

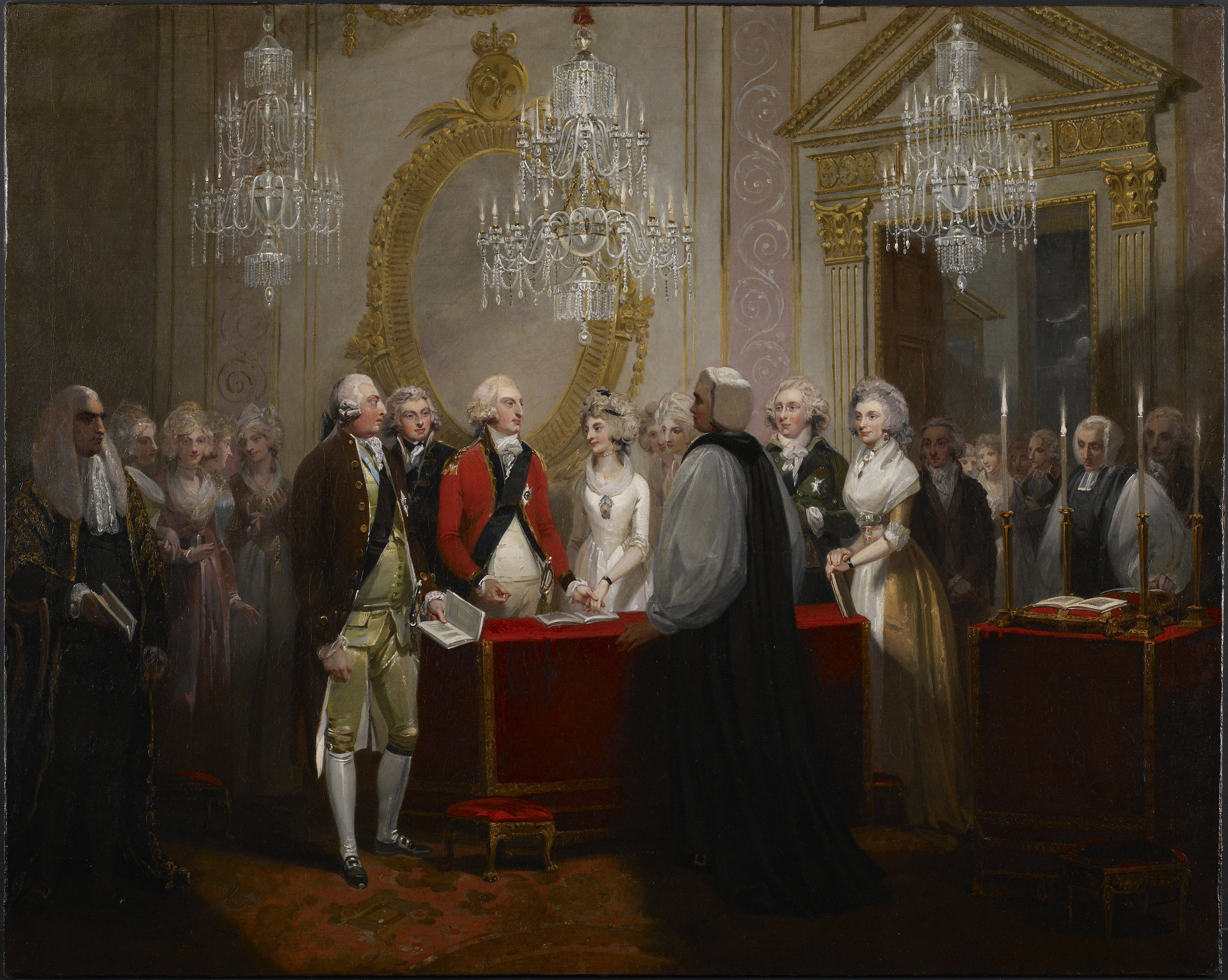
The Marriage of the Duke and Duchess of York, 1791

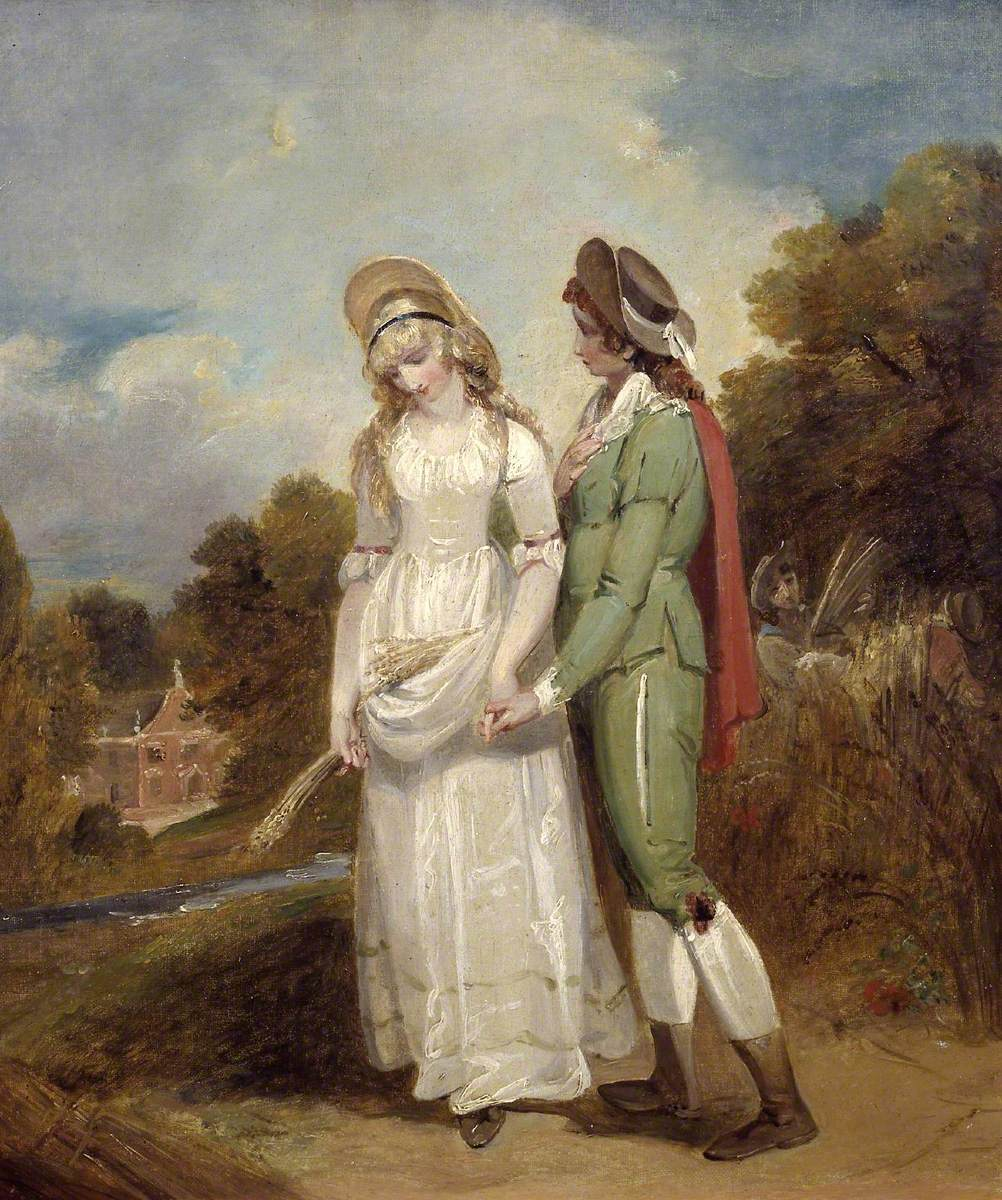
Palemon and Lavinia, 1792

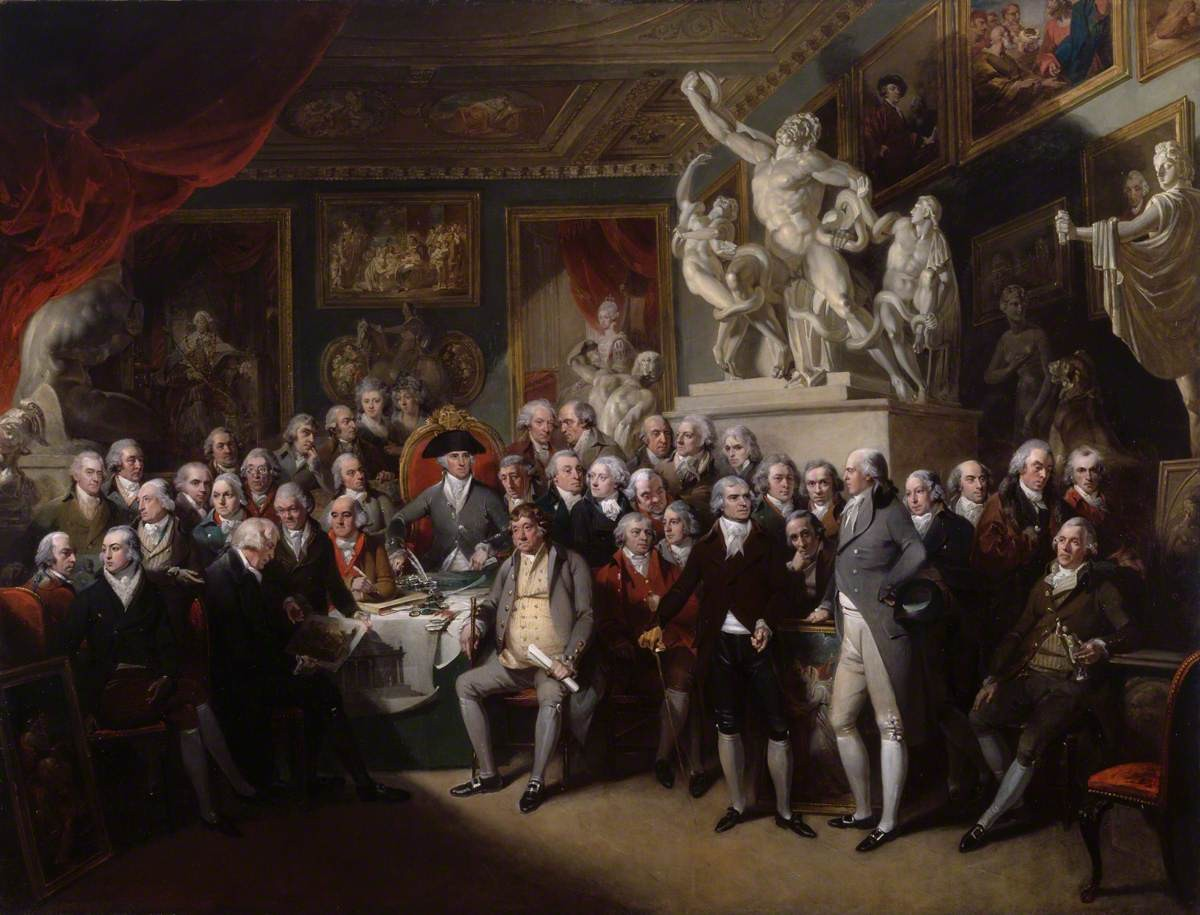
The Royal Academicians in General Assembly, 1795

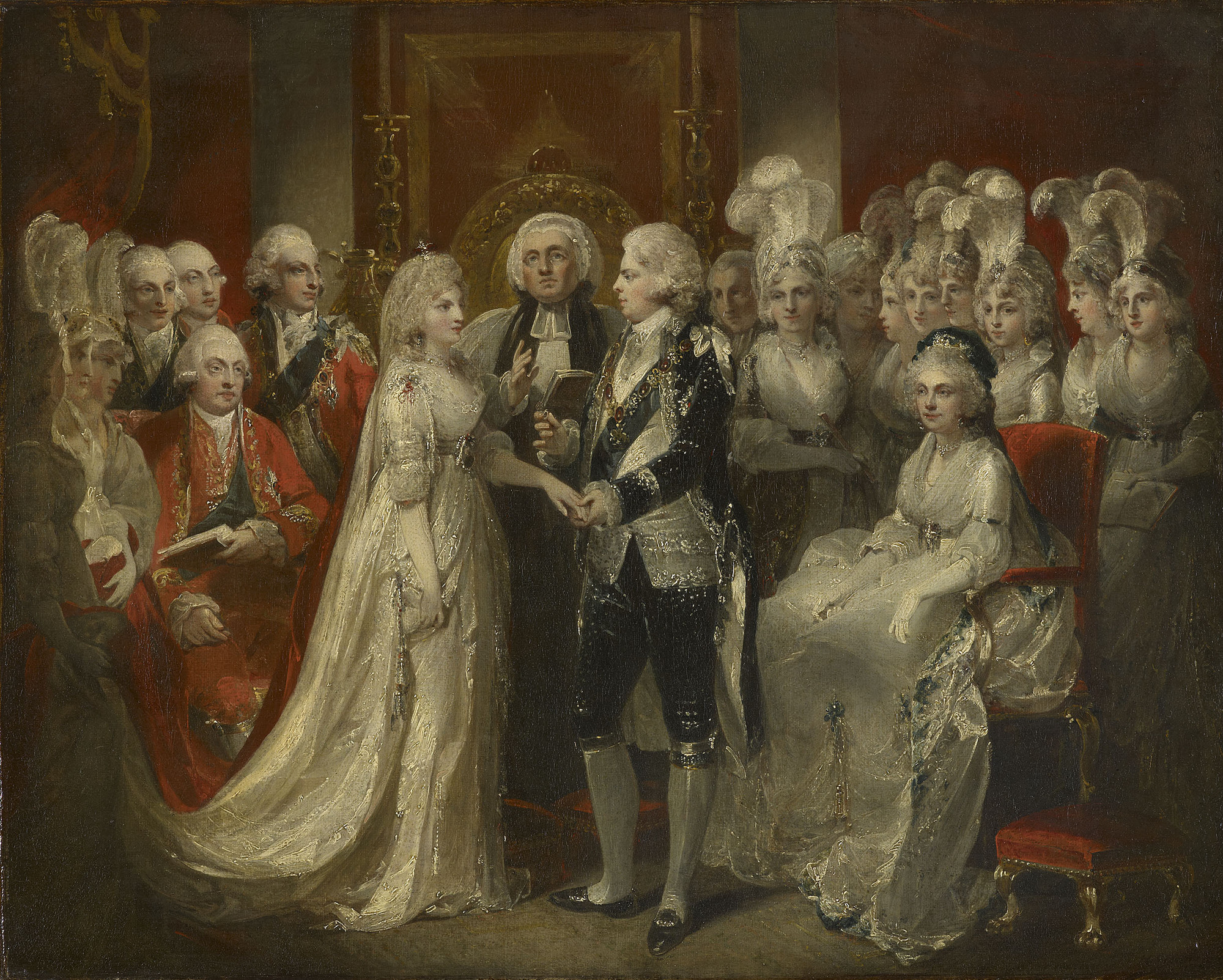
The Marriage of George IV when Prince of Wales, 1795

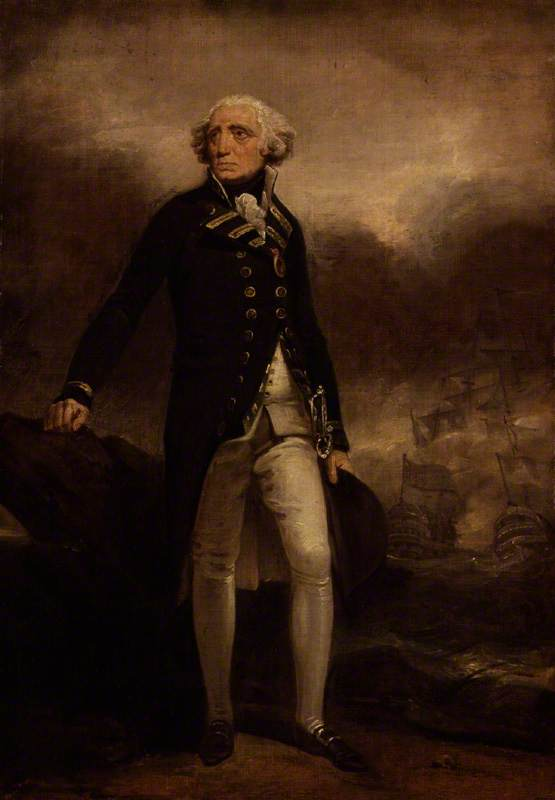
Richard Howe, 1st Earl Howe, c 1795.

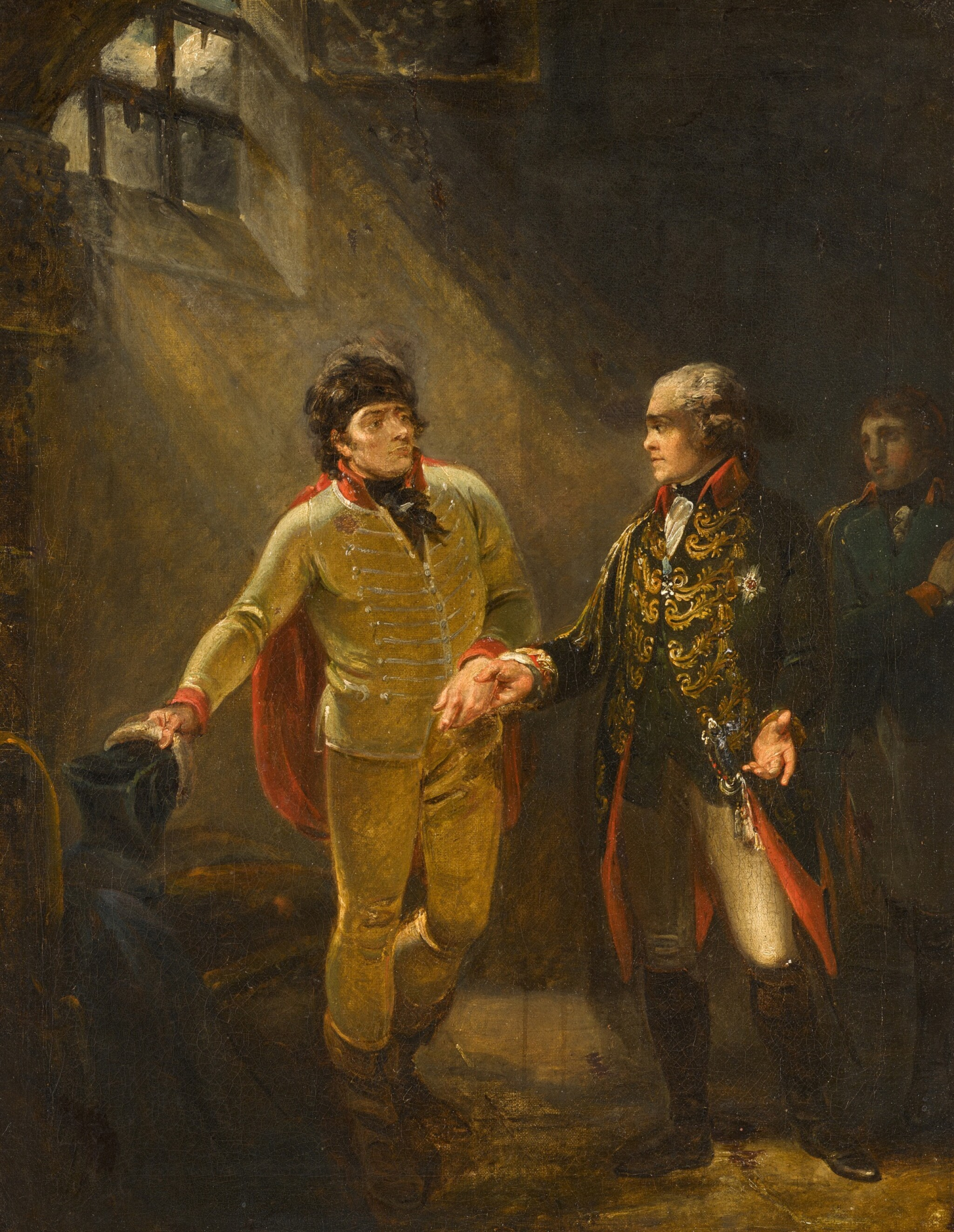
Emperor Paul I of Russia granting liberty to General Kościuszko, 1797

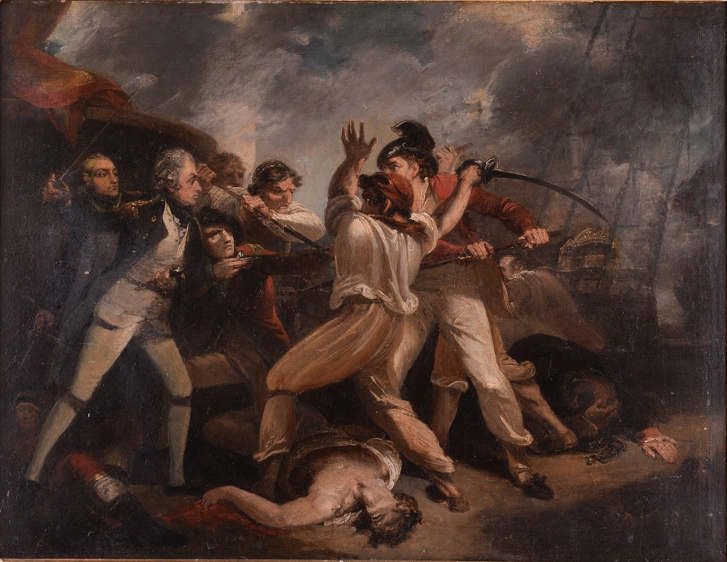
Nelson at Cape St Vincent, 1799
