= Annie Gray =

British food historian

- Occupation: Food historian
- Known for: The Kitchen Cabinet

Annie Gray is a British food historian specialising in the era from the 1650s to 1950s.

== Education and academia ==
Gray studied modern history at the University of Oxford, followed by an MA in historical archaeology at the University of York and a PhD from the University of Liverpool. Gray is an honorary fellow at the University of York and a fellow of the Royal Historical Society.

== Career ==
Gray is known for regular appearances on The Kitchen Cabinet as the resident food historian. She has worked on the show since 2012 and wrote the official publication accompanying the series in 2021, which includes a foreword from the show's host, Jay Rayner.

Gray worked as an expert on BBC television series The Sweet Makers alongside Emma Dabiri, and on Victorian Bakers. She presented A Merry Tudor Christmas with Lucy Worsley.

Gray appeared on The Great British Bake Off as a food historian during series 1–5.

In 2016, Gray was granted "privileged access" to cook at Osborne House with James Martin, where the kitchens had not been used since the late 1800s.

Gray was a consultant for the English Heritage YouTube series The Victorian Way about Victorian cook Avis Crocombe and co-authored the tie-in cookbook. She has also experimented with recipes from the 300-year-old The Unknown Ladies Cookbook.

Gray has often been featured in coverage of public celebrations talking about the foods that were historically eaten at related events such as royal banquets, VE Day, or royal jubilees. She has also featured in the media talking about her work reconstructing Christmas dinners from previous eras.

== Publications ==
- The Greedy Queen: Eating With Victoria
- The Official Downton Abbey Cookbook
- From the Alps to the Dales: 100 Years of Bettys
- Victory in the Kitchen: The Life of Churchill's Cook
- At Christmas We Feast: Festive Food Through the Ages
- Food for Thought: Selected Writings on Food
- How to Cook The Victorian Way with Mrs Crocombe
- The Kitchen Cabinet: A Year of Recipes, Flavours, Facts & Stories for Food Lovers
- The Official Call The Midwife Cookbook.
- The Bookshop, The Draper, The Candlestick Maker: a history of the high street
