= The Storming of the Bastille (painting) =

Painting by Henry Singleton

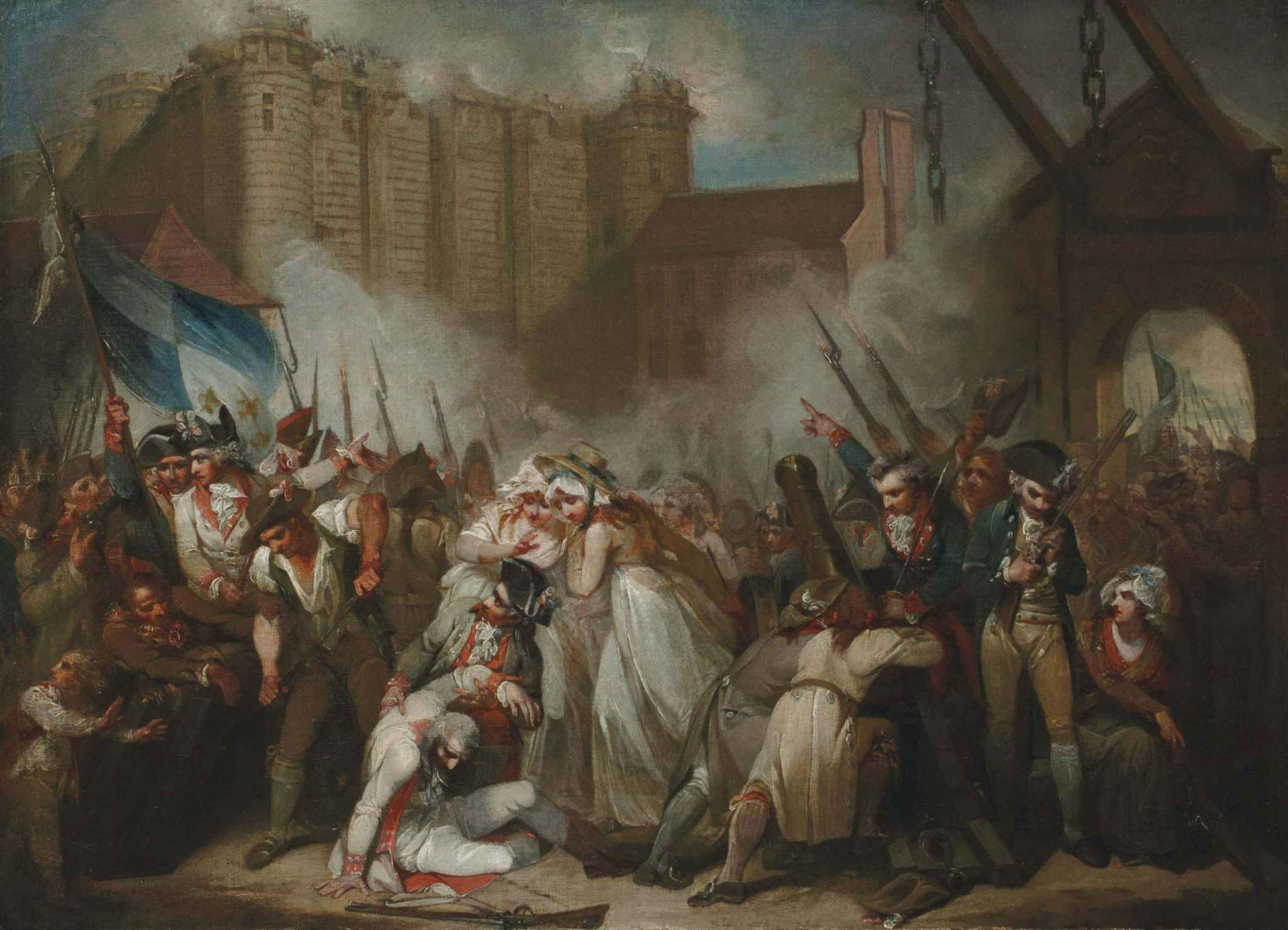
- Artist: Henry Singleton
- Year: c.1790
- Type: Oil on canvas, history painting
- Dimensions: 45.1 cm × 60.4 cm (17.8 in × 23.8 in)
- Location: Museum of the French Revolution, Vizille

The Storming of the Bastille is a 1790 history painting by the British artist Henry Singleton. It depicts the Storming of the Bastille on 14 July 1789. Commemorated as Bastille Day, it is considered a significant moment in the eruption of the French Revolution which later led to the Execution of Louis XVI in 1793. It portrays the assault on the Bastille, long a prison of the Ancien Regime, from the view of the insurgents. Today the painting is in the collection of the Museum of the French Revolution in Vizille.

== Bibliography ==
- Fairclough, Mary. The Romantic Crowd: Sympathy, Controversy and Print Culture. Cambridge University Press, 2013.
- Pressly, William L. The French Revolution as Blasphemy: Johan Zoffany's Paintings of the Massacre at Paris, August 10, 1792. University of California Press, 2023.
- Weber, Carolyn (ed.) Romanticism and Parenting: Image, Instruction and Ideology. Cambridge Scholars Publishing, 2009.
