= Bernadette Banner =

American YouTuber, author, and former costume assistant

- Born: 1994 or 1995 (age 31–32)
- Education: New York University
- Occupation: YouTuber

YouTube information
- Channel: Bernadette Banner
- Years active: 2018-present
- Subscribers: 1.96 million
- Views: 176 million
- Last updated: 30 August 2026
- Website: https://bernadettebanner.co.uk/

Bernadette Banner (born 1994 or 1995) is an American YouTuber and author currently based in London.

== Education and previous career ==
Banner studied in the Production and Design Studio at Tisch School of the Arts. Prior to graduation, she briefly worked as a costume assistant for Broadway, as well as for a parody preview video of the Broadway musical Frozen. After that, she did an internship for Tony Award-winning costume designer Jenny Tiramani at the School of Historical Dress in London.

== Content ==
Banner began her YouTube channel on garment construction in 2018. She is known for her interest in and promotion of historical dress reconstruction and study of a range of historical fashion periods from the early Medieval era to World War I, with a primary focus on the Victorian and Edwardian eras. She has focused on the lack of quality in modern fast fashion. She is also known for sewing in Original Practice, the art of crafting clothes using historically informed methods and materials.

A significant area investigated by Banner has been the accuracy in reproductions of historical clothing, for example in films like Little Women (2019) and Beauty and the Beast (2017). In addition, she has also been featured by Glamour as commentary for an analysis of Mary Poppins' dressing.

=== On fast fashion ===
On her channel, Banner often highlights the fast fashion industry's environmental impacts and poor labor practices as a reason to avoid the industry. As an alternative, she suggests "slow fashion" — a limited-size wardrobe of durable garments which can be mended by hand as needed. In 2019, a 15th-century-inspired gown Banner made was poorly copied and sold by an online merchant using Banner's photo in the sales listing. Banner bought the dress and made a public video in which she criticized its poor construction.

== Writings ==
In 2022, she authored a non-fiction book, Make, Sew and Mend, published by Page Street Publishing. It was a BookScan trade paperback bestseller for the third week of May 2022.

== Personal life ==
Banner is based in London. In September 2025 she publicly referred to her wife in an Instagram post that also included the hashtag #gayapproved. She also mentioned her wife in a March 2026 YouTube video while making flower crowns inspired by Victorian Art Nouveau and Florence + the Machine.
