= Robert F. Lopez =

US Navy officer (1857–1936)

Robert Files Lopez (March 31, 1857 – September 20, 1936) was an officer in the United States Navy. He entered Annapolis with the Class of 1879, and he became the first Hispanic-American to graduate from the United States Naval Academy.

== Biography ==
Lopez served as an ensign aboard the USS Thetis during a voyage of exploration around Alaska in 1888–89. Lopez Point on Herschel Island was named in his honor by the commander of Thetis, Charles Stockton.

The highlight of his 32-year naval career, was his service under Admiral Dewey's command at the first major engagement of the Spanish–American War, the Battle of Manila Bay in 1898.

Shortly after the war ended, Lopez became a plankowner of the torpedo boat USS Rowan (TB-8) when it was commissioned on 1 April 1899.

Following his assignment to Rowan, Lopez commanded the destroyer Preble (DD-12) from 1904 to 1906.

Captain Lopez's last posting before retirement was as senior member of a naval board which conducted a general survey of vessels on the Pacific coast. He retired as a Commodore (Rear Admiral) in 1911.

Upon America's entry into World War I in 1917, Lopez was recalled to duty as acting commandant of the Mare Island Naval Shipyard, located northeast of San Francisco.

Commodore Lopez died in Alameda, California after a year's illness at the age of 77.

== Awards ==
- Dewey Medal
- Spanish Campaign Medal
- Philippine Campaign Medal
- Victory Medal

== Dates of rank ==
- Cadet Midshipman - 29 September 1874
- Midshipman - 10 June 1881
- Ensign (junior grade) - 3 March 1883
- Ensign - 26 June 1884
- Lieutenant (junior grade) - 16 April 1892
- Lieutenant - 1 April 1896
- Lieutenant Commander - 11 April 1902
- Commander - 1 July 1907
- Captain - c. March 1911
- Commodore, Retired list - 30 June 1911

== See also ==
- Hispanics in the United States Naval Academy
