= Hispanics in the United States Naval Academy =

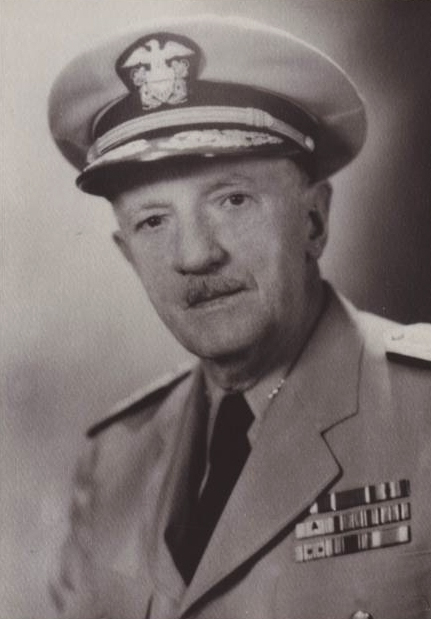
Frederick Lois Riefkohl

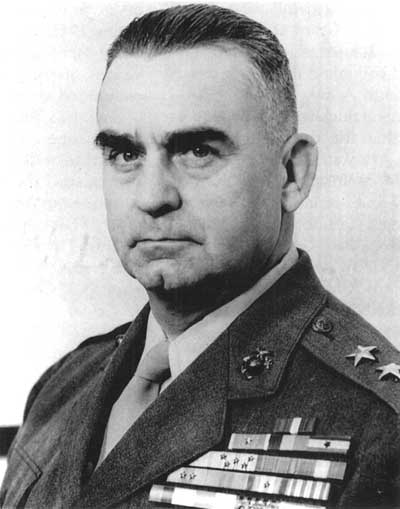
Pedro Augusto del Valle

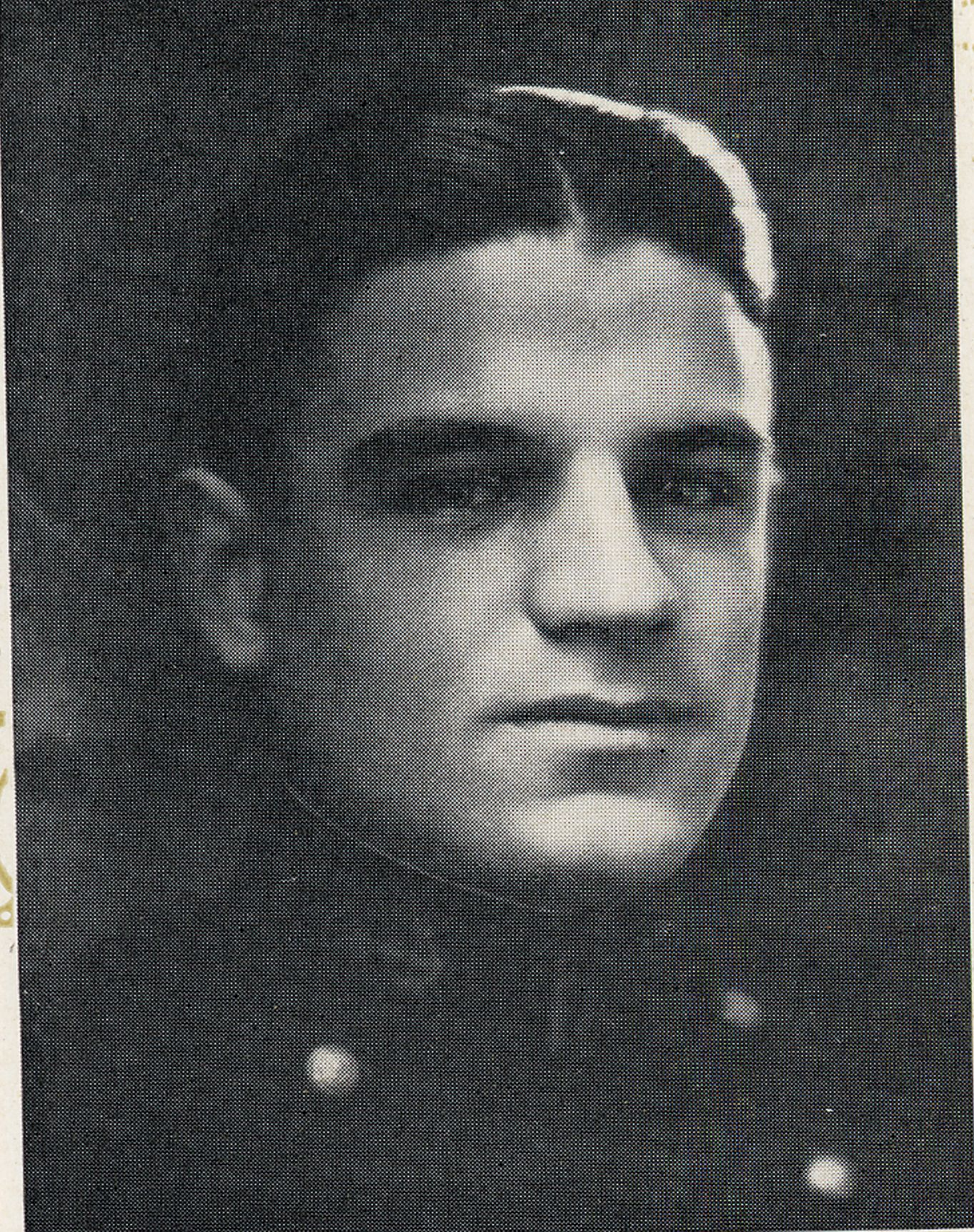
Jose M. Cabanillas

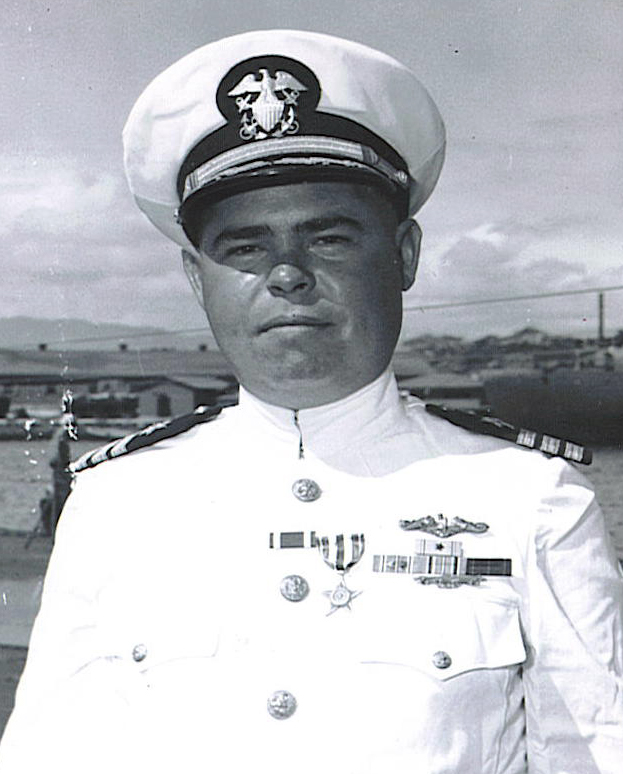
Marion Frederic Ramírez de Arellano

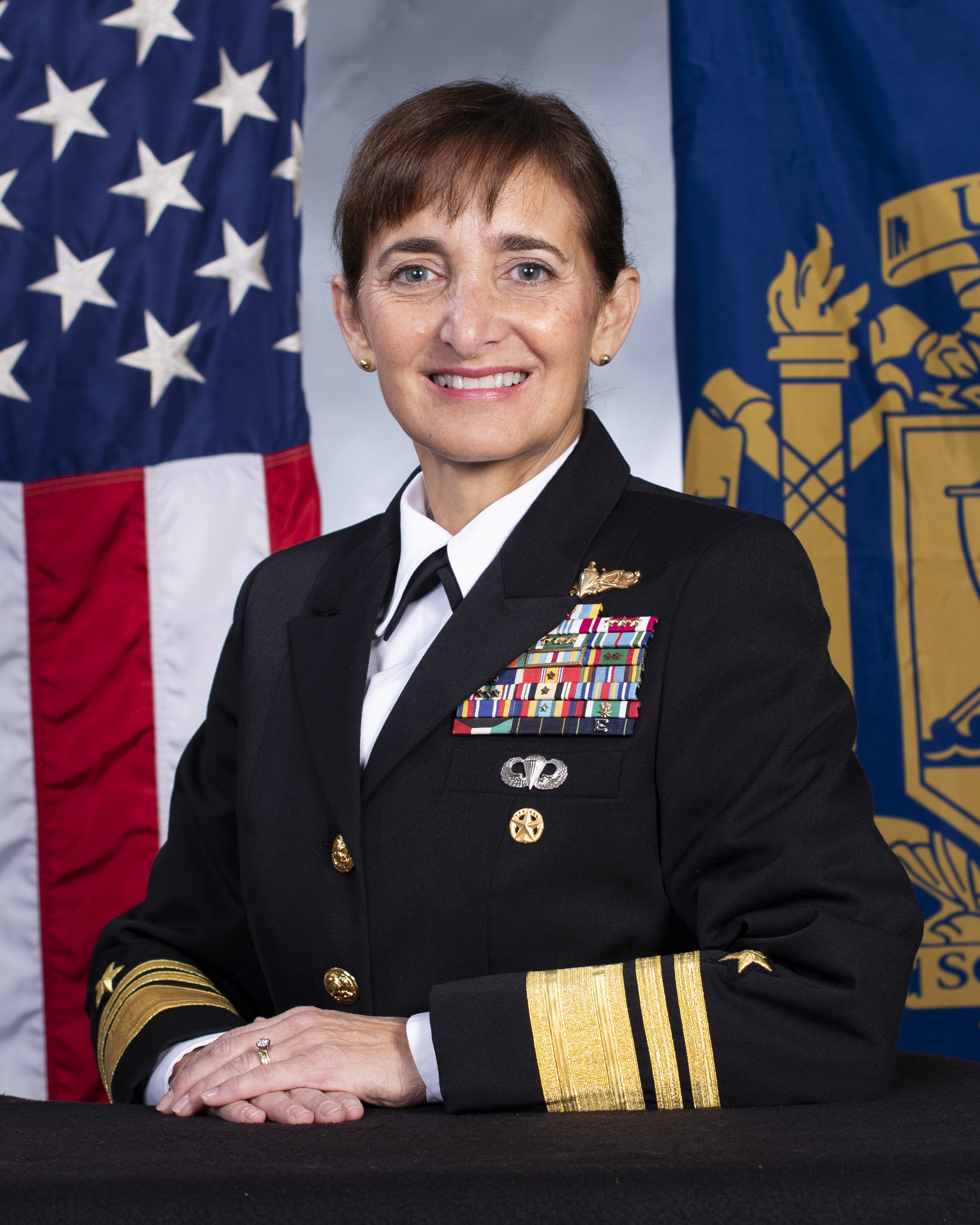
Yvette M. Davids

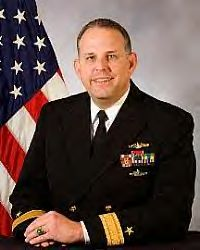
Patrick H. Brady

Hispanics in the United States Naval Academy account for the largest minority group in the institution. According to the academy, the Class of 2009 includes 271 (22.2%) minority midshipmen. Out of these 271 midshipmen, 115 are of Hispanic heritage. In 2004, of the total of 736 female midshipmen, 74 (10%) of them were of Hispanic descent.

The United States Navy has implemented a recruitment program directed towards this group, El Navy, whose principal aim is to attract those who speak Spanish.

== First Hispanic-American alumni of the Academy ==
The United States Naval Academy (USNA), founded 1845, is an institution for the undergraduate education of officers of the United States Navy and Marine Corps.

The first Hispanic-American to graduate from the academy was Commodore Robert F. Lopez, Class of 1879. The first Hispanic to graduate from the academy and to reach the rank of admiral was a Puerto Rican, Rear Admiral Frederick Lois Riefkohl, Class of 1911.

In 1980, the USNA included Hispanic/Latino as a racial category for demographic purposes. Four women identified themselves as Hispanics in the Class of 1981, and they became the first Hispanic women to graduate from the academy. The four women were Carmel Gilliland, who had the highest class rank; Lilia Ramirez, who retired with the rank of Commander; Ina Marie Gomez; and Trinora Pinto.

== Notable Hispanic USNA graduates ==
Amongst the academy's Hispanic alumni who have distinguished themselves as career officers in the Navy, the Marine Corps or the United States Air Force are the following:

=== 19th century, notable Hispanic USNA graduates ===
- Commodore Robert F. Lopez, USN - USNA Class of 1879. Born in Davenport, Iowa. Appointed from Tennessee, 9th Congressional District, Lopez was admitted to the USNA on September 29, 1874. Captain Lopez retired from the Navy in 1911 as a Commodore. During World War I, he was recalled to active duty. Lopez served as Commandant of the Mare Island Naval Shipyard north of San Francisco.

=== 1900-1959, notable Hispanic USNA graduates ===
- Rear Admiral Frederick Lois Riefkohl, USN – USNA Class of 1911. Born and raised in Maunabo, Puerto Rico, he was the first Puerto Rican to graduate from the Naval Academy. He was a World War I Navy Cross recipient who served as captain of the USS Vincennes during World War II.
- Lieutenant General Pedro Augusto del Valle, USMC - USNA Class of 1915. Born in San Juan, Puerto Rico (28 August 1893 - 28 April 1978) and appointed to the USNA on 17 June 1911 by Governor George R. Colton. He was a United States Marine Corps officer who became the first Hispanic to reach the rank of lieutenant general. His military career included service in World War I, Haiti and Nicaragua during the so-called Banana Wars of the 1920s; in the seizure of Guadalcanal; and later as commanding general of the U.S. 1st Marine Division during World War II.
- Rear Admiral Jose M. Cabanillas, USN - USNA Class of 1924. Born in Mayagüez, Puerto Rico, was an executive officer of the USS Texas which participated in the invasions of North Africa and Normandy (D-Day) during World War II. In 1945, he became the first commanding officer of the USS Grundy.
- Rear Admiral Edmund Ernest García, USN - USNA Class of 1927. Born in San Juan, Puerto Rico, his father Enrique Garcia was a captain in the U.S. Army. He was originally a member of the Class of 1926 but requested to be turned back to the class of 1927 for academic deficiency in mathematics. During World War II was commander of the destroyer escort USS Sloat and saw action in the invasions of Africa, Sicily, and France.
- Colonel Jaime Sabater Sr., USMC - USNA Class of 1927. Sabater was born on May 28, 1904, in San Juan, Puerto Rico. He was appointed to USNA on July 8, 1923, by Félix Córdova Dávila, the resident commissioner of Puerto Rico in Washington D.C. During World War II, commanded the 1st Battalion, 9th Marines during the Bougainville amphibious operations. Commanding officer of the 3rd Marines, Fleet Marine Force, Western Pacific (formerly the 3rd Battalion, 4th Marines) from 1 October 1947 to 1 April 1948 in Qingdao, China.
- Rear Admiral Henry G. Sanchez, USN – USNA Class of 1930. Born on 29 December 1907. During World War II, then-LCDR Sanchez commanded VF-72, a F4F squadron of 37 aircraft, on board the USS Hornet from July to October 1942. His squadron was responsible for shooting down 38 Japanese airplanes during his command tour which included the Battle of the Santa Cruz Islands.
- Admiral Horacio Rivero Jr., USN - USNA Class of 1931. Was the first four-star admiral from Puerto Rico and the second Hispanic-American full admiral, after Admiral David Farragut, in the Navy. Born in Ponce, Puerto Rico and graduated third in his USNA class. During World War II, he served aboard the USS San Juan and was involved in providing artillery cover for Marines landing on Guadalcanal, Marshall Islands, Iwo Jima, and Okinawa. In October 1962, Admiral Rivero found himself in the middle of the Cuban Missile Crisis. As Commander of amphibious forces, Atlantic Fleet, he was on the front line of the vessels sent to the Caribbean by President Kennedy to stop the Cold War from escalating into World War III.
- Captain Marion Frederic Ramírez de Arellano, USN - USNA Class of 1936. Born in San Juan, Puerto Rico was the first Hispanic submarine commanding officer. He was awarded two Silver Star Medals, the Legion of Merit, and a Bronze Star Medal for his actions against the Japanese Imperial Navy. Not only is he credited with the sinking of at least two Japanese ships, but he also led the rescue of the lives of numerous downed Navy pilots.
- Rear Admiral Rafael Celestino Benítez, USN - USNA Class of 1939. Born in Juncos, Puerto Rico, was a lieutenant commander and saw action aboard submarines and on various occasions weathered depth charge attacks. For his actions, he was awarded the Silver and Bronze Stars. Benitez would later play an important role in the first American undersea spy mission of the Cold War as commander of the submarine USS Cochino in what became known as the "Cochino Incident".
- 1st Lieutenant Baldomero Lopez, USMC - USNA Class of 1947. Posthumously awarded the Medal of Honor for smothering a hand grenade with his own body during the Inchon landing on 15 September 1950 during the Korean War. His father, also named Baldomero, came to Tampa, Florida as a young man from the Asturias region of Spain. Born on 23 August 1925 in Tampa, Florida he enlisted in the Navy on 8 July 1943 and served until 11 June 1944 when he was given a Fleet appointment to the U.S. Naval Academy. There is a maritime vessel named after him, USNS 1St Lt Baldomero Lopez, plus a room in Bancroft Hall at the U.S. Naval Academy bears his name.
- General Julio Torres, USAF - USNA Class of 1957. Torres was born in Santurce, Puerto Rico. He completed his premedical studies at the University of Puerto Rico before attending the Naval Academy. He continued his academic education and earned a master's degree and professional engineers degrees in Electrical Engineering at Stanford University. He later earned a doctorate in Electrical Engineering and Applied Physics at the same institution. In 1983, Torres graduated from the United States Naval War College and in 1984 he completed his studies at the Industrial College of the Armed Forces.
- Major Pedro Vazquez, USMC - USNA Class of 1957. He was born in San Juan, Puerto Rico. Completed a degree in law from the University of Puerto Rico. Was Deputy General Counsel of the U.S. Department of Commerce and later on became Secretary of State of Puerto Rico and Chief of Staff to then Governor Carlos Romero Barceló.
- Rear Admiral Benjamin F. Montoya, USN – USNA Class of 1958. He was born in Indio, California and graduated from Coachella Valley High School in 1953. He retired from the Navy in 1989 as the Chief of the Navy Civil Engineer Corps and Commander of the Naval Facilities Engineering Command.
- Vice Admiral Jesse J. Hernandez, USN – USNA Class of 1958. Hernandez was the Commander, US Naval Forces Japan from 1990 to 1993.

=== 1960-present, notable Hispanic USNA graduates ===
- Rear Admiral Henry F. Herrera, USN – USNA Class of 1966. Hails from Miami Springs, Florida, he was the commanding officer of two fleet ballistic missile submarines, the President of the Board of Inspection and Survey, the Commander of Submarine Group NINE, and the Director, C41 Systems (J-6), U.S. Strategic Command.
- Rear Admiral Marc Y.E. Pelaez, USN – USNA Class of 1968. He was commanding officer of nuclear-powered attack submarine USS Sunfish, director of submarine technology at the Defense Advanced Research Projects Agency (DARPA), and Chief of the Office of Naval Research.
- Rear Admiral George "Rico" Mayer, USN – USNA Class of 1975. Born and raised in Puerto Rico, became a naval aviator and assumed his current assignment as Commander, Naval Safety Center, in August 2005. Mayer earned a master's degree from the U.S. Naval War College.
- Brigadier General Joseph V. Medina, USMC – USNA Class of 1976. In November 2003, Medina took command of Expeditionary Strike Group Three. This event marked the first time in history that a United States Marine Corps officer took command of a Naval flotilla. He has a Bachelor of Science (Physics) and a Master of Science (Systems Management) degree from the University of Southern California.
- Rear Admiral Jay A. DeLoach, USN - USNA Class of 1978. Born in San Diego, California, His academic background includes a Bachelor of Science degree in Marine Engineering and two master's degree; Master of Arts in Management & Supervision and Masters of Engineering in Nuclear Engineering. DeLoach is the Assistant Deputy Chief of Naval Operations for Resources, Requirements and Assessments. DeLoach played an instrumental role in implementing a visionary "Memorandum of Understanding" between the Submarine Force Active component and the Reserve component. He helped pioneer many key initiatives that have since been adopted Navy-wide.
- Captain Miguel López Alegría - Astronaut, USN - USNA Class of 1980. Born 30 May 1958, in Madrid, Spain and raised in Mission Viejo, California. His academic background include a Bachelor of Science degree in systems engineering from the U.S. Naval Academy in 1980; and a Master of Science degree in aeronautical engineering from the U.S. Naval Postgraduate School in 1988. Graduate of Harvard University's Kennedy School of Government Program for Senior Executives in National and International Security. Speaks Spanish, French and Russian. López Alegría served as pilot and mission commander of EP-3E aircraft. he was assigned to NASA as an engineering test pilot and program manager at the Naval Air Test Center. López Alegría reported for training to the Johnson Space Center (JSC) in August 1992. After one year of training he was designated as an astronaut. Between 20 October 1995 and 21 April 2007, López Alegría participated in four spaceflights, logged over 257 days in space, and performed 10 spacewalks accumulating a total of 67 hours and 40 minutes of Extra-vehicular Activity (EVA).
- Rear Admiral Patrick H. Brady, USN – USNA Class of 1981. Born in Camp Springs, Maryland is the deputy director, Submarine Warfare Division (N87B). Brady, who is of Irish and Hispanic descent, graduated from the United States Naval Academy in 1981 with a Bachelor of Science in Ocean Engineering. Brady's academic accomplishments also include a Master of Arts in National Security Affairs from the Naval Postgraduate School. He attended the Air Force Command and Staff College, and completed Navy Nuclear Power training and Level Three acquisition training. Prior to his current position, Brady was the Commander of the Naval Undersea Warfare Center.
- Commander Lilia L. Ramirez (ret.), USN – USNA Class of 1981. Born in Colombia and raised in Glen Cove, New York, she was one of the first four Hispanic female graduates of the academy. She is currently the Director of the International Programs Office, for the Department of Homeland Security, Science and Technology Directorate.
- Carlos Del Toro (born 1961) is a Cuban-American entrepreneur and retired United States Navy officer who served as the 78th United States secretary of the Navy from 2021 to 2025. He is the second Hispanic American to serve as the Secretary of the Navy, after Edward Hidalgo.
- Colonel Christopher J. "Gus" Loria - Astronaut, USMC - USNA Class of 1983. Born 9 July 1960 in Belmont, Massachusetts. His educational background includes a Bachelor of Science degree in general engineering from the U.S. Naval Academy (1983). He has a Master in Public Administration from John F. Kennedy School of Government, Harvard University (2004); and an Executive Certificate in Management and Leadership from the MIT Sloan School of MManagement. Colonel Loria flew 42 combat missions with Marine Fighter Attack squadron VMFA-314 in support of allied operations during Operations Desert Shield and Desert Storm. Colonel Loria was the Naval Test Wing Atlantic's test pilot of the year in 1995. In 1996 he was the runner up for the Society of Experimental Test Pilot's coveted Iven C. Kinchloe Award for the test pilot of the year world-wide. Selected by NASA in April 1996, Loria completed two years of training and evaluation, and qualified for flight assignment as a pilot. From September 2002 through July 2003 he served as the Chief of Flight Test for the Orbital Space Plane Program.
- Colonel George David Zamka - Astronaut, USMC - USNA Class of 1984. Born in Jersey City, New Jersey in 1962. He was raised in New York City; Irvington, New York; Medellín, Colombia; and Rochester Hills, Michigan. In June 1998, Zamka was selected for the astronaut program, and reported for training in August. Zamka served as lead for the shuttle training and procedures division and as supervisor for the astronaut candidate class of 2004. Zamka made his first spaceflight as the pilot of STS-120, This was a Space Shuttle mission to the International Space Station to deliver the U.S. Node 2 Module, while also reconfiguring part of the station to prepare it for future assembly missions. The mission was flown in September 2007 by Space Shuttle Atlantis.
- Vice Admiral Yvette M. Davids, USN – USNA Class of 1989. She was the first Hispanic American woman to command a navy ship, due to commanding the frigate USS Curts (FFG-38) from April 2007 to November 2008.

== Gallery of Hispanic USNA Alumni ==
Hispanic USNA Alumni
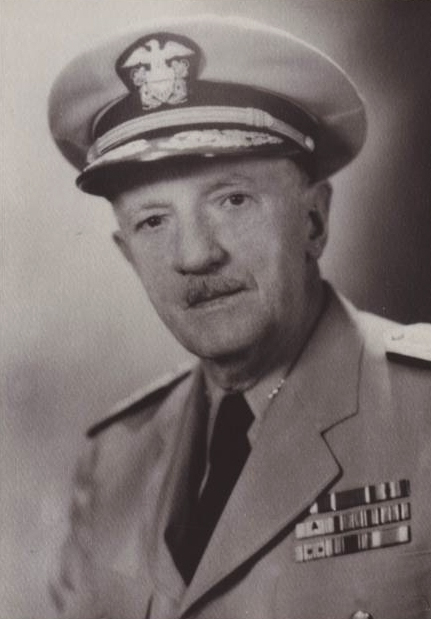
RADM Frederick Lois Riefkohl
Class of 1911

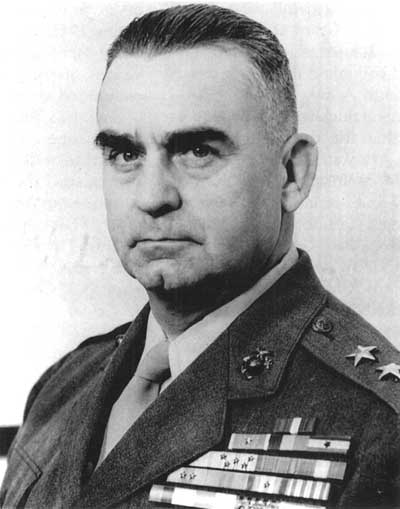
Lt. Gen. Pedro Augusto del Valle
Class of 1915

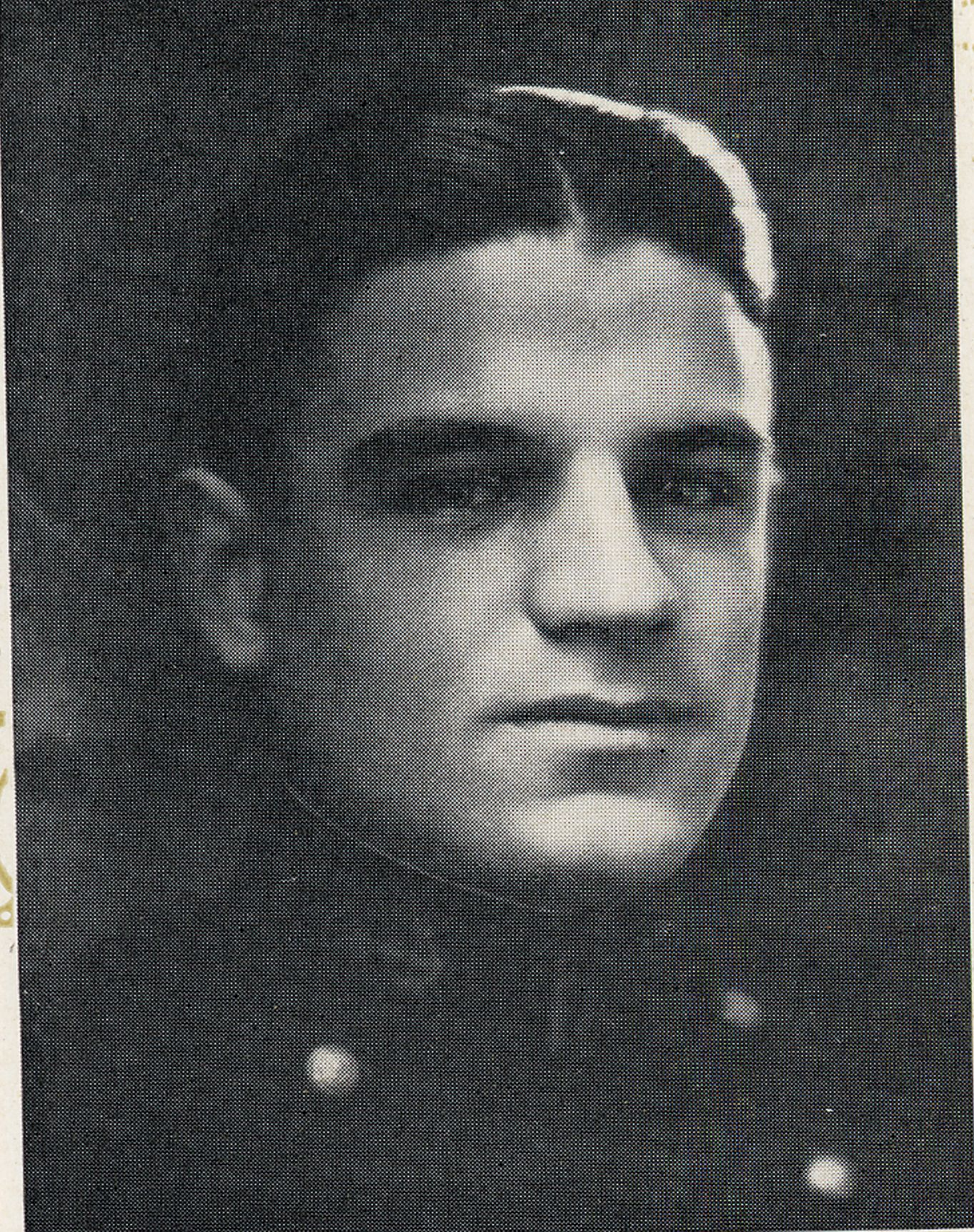
RADM Jose M. Cabanillas
Class of 1919

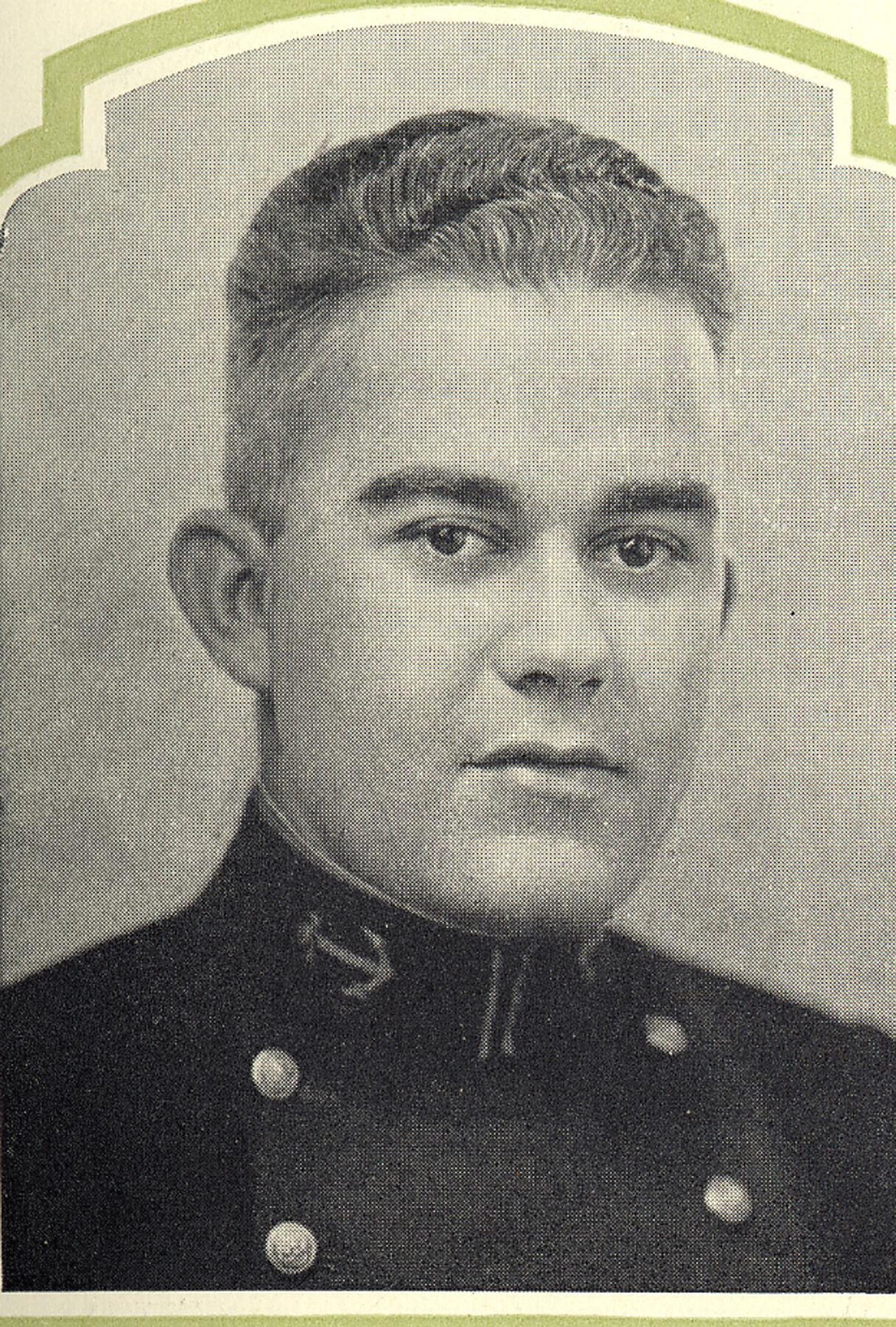
RADM Edmund Ernest García
Class of 1926

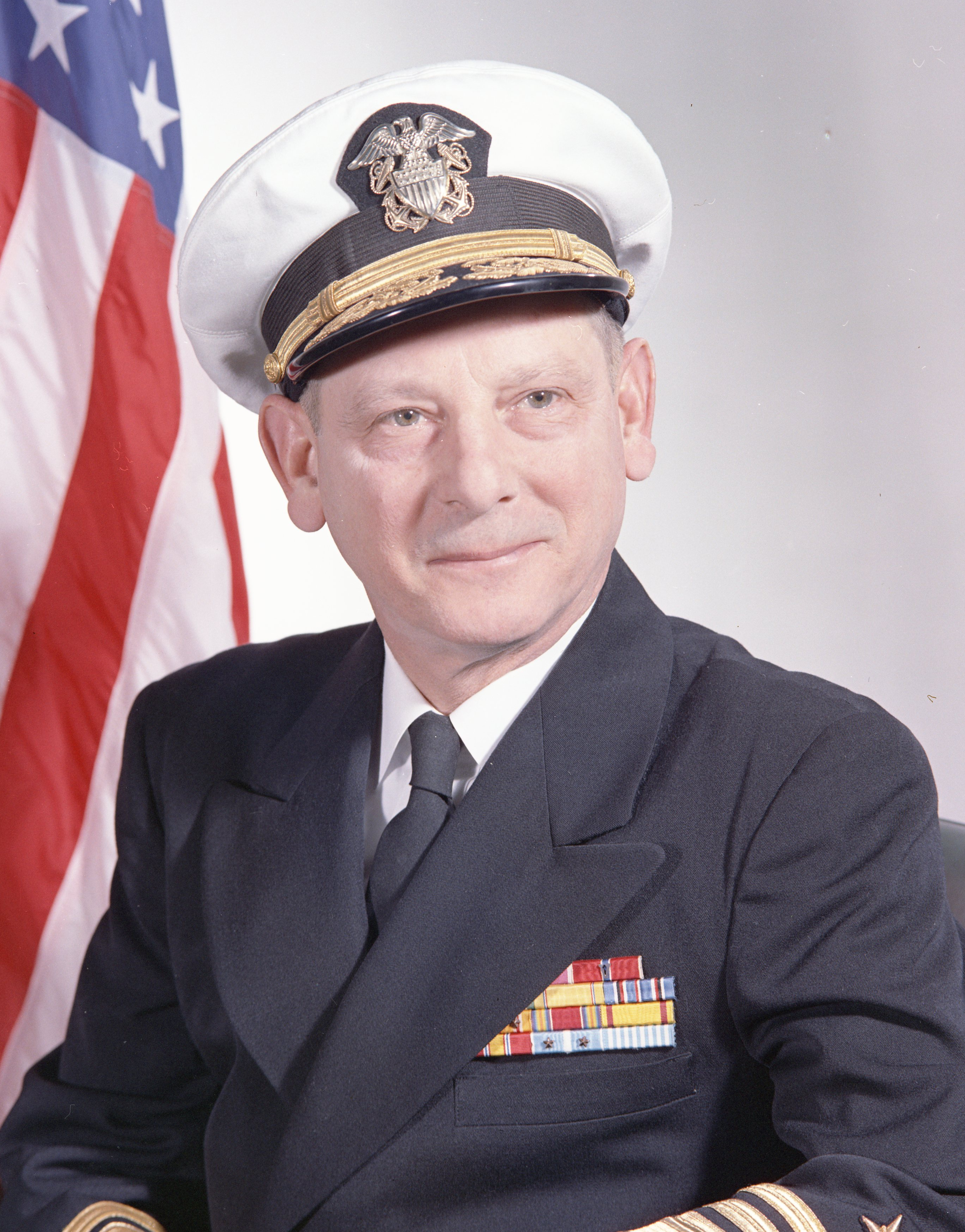
ADM Horacio Rivero Jr.
Class of 1931

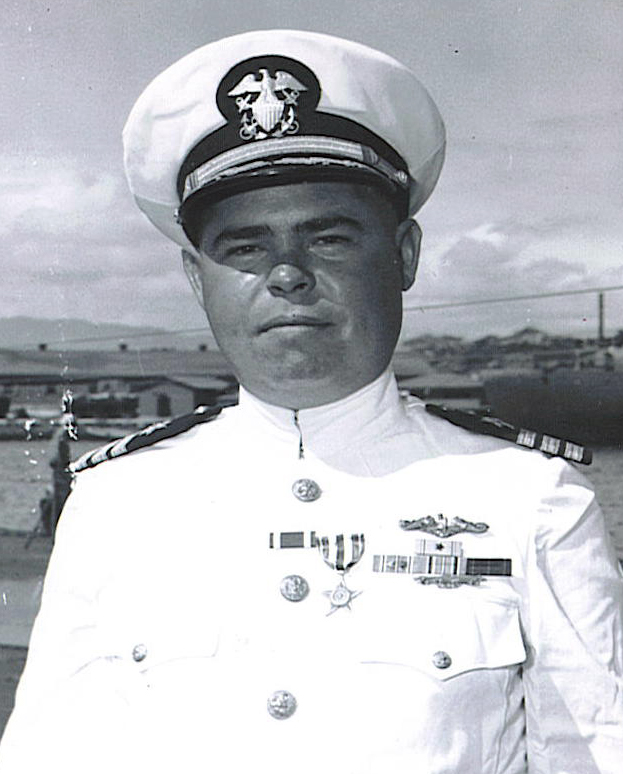
Capt. Marion Frederic
Ramirez de Arellano
Class of 1935

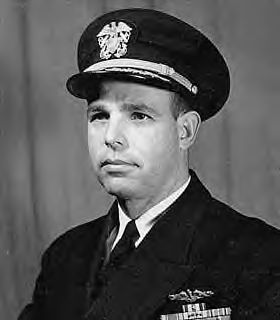
RADM Rafael Celetino Benitez
Class of 1939

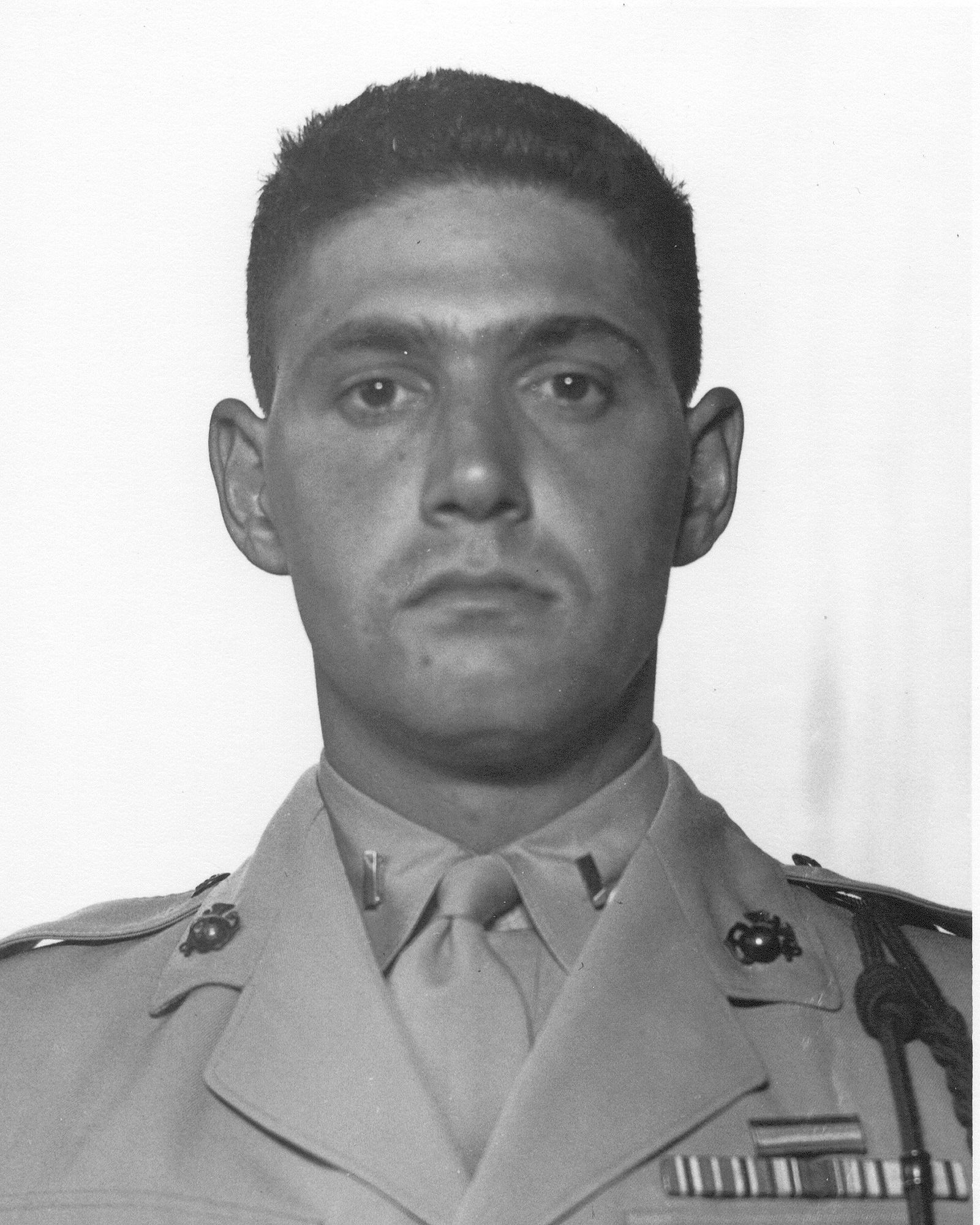
1st Lt. Baldomero Lopez
Class of 1947

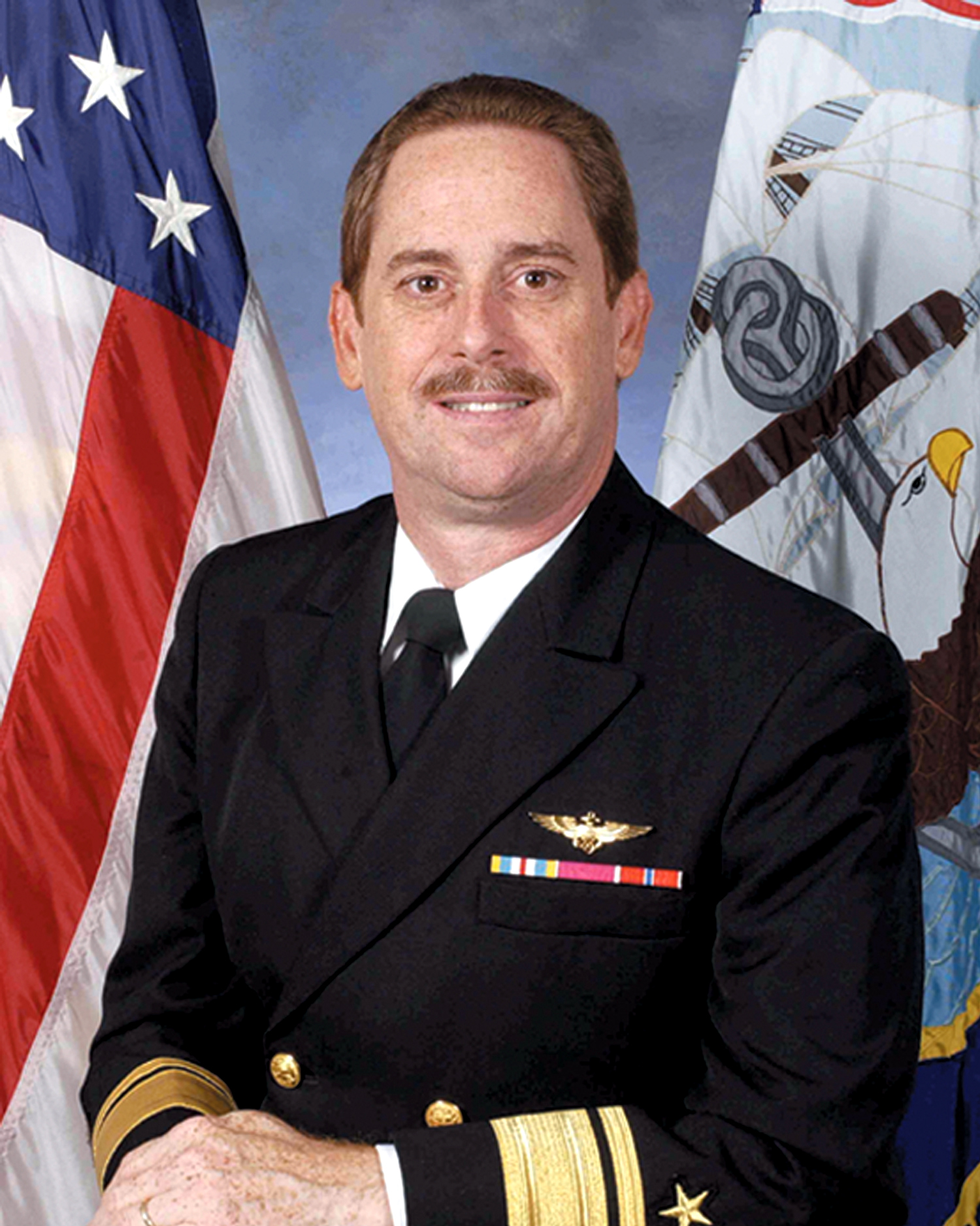
RADM George "Rico" Mayer
Class of 1975

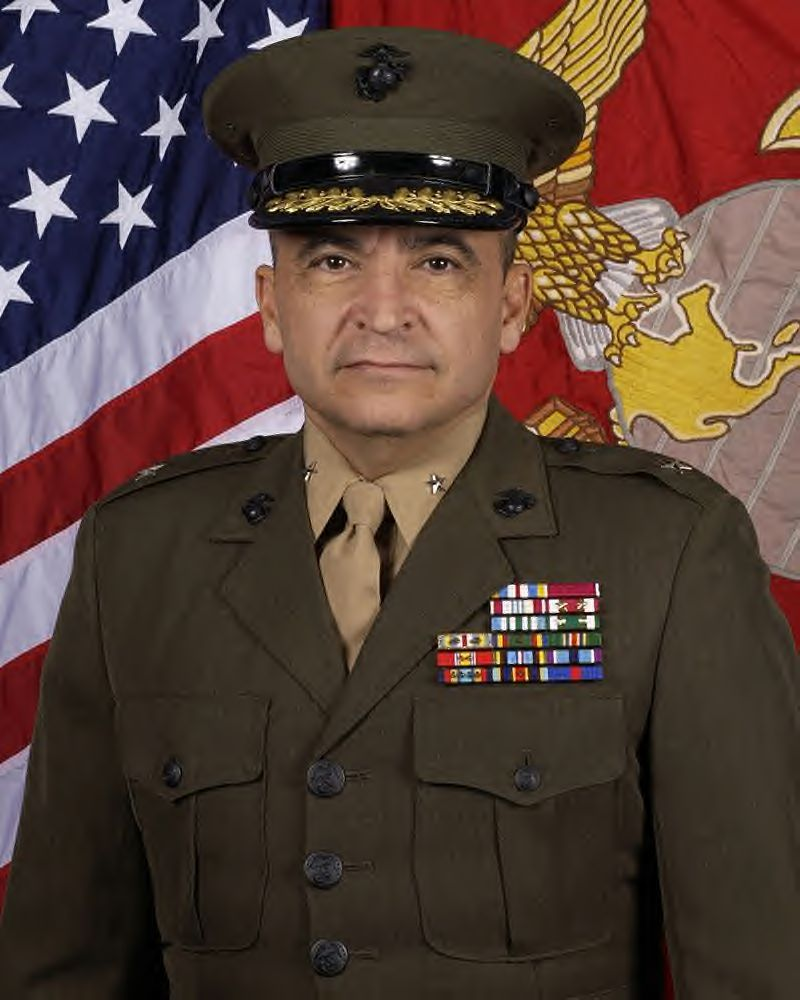
Brigadier General
Joseph V. Medina
Class of 1976

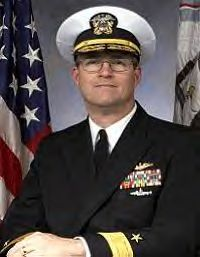
RADM Jay A. DeLoach
Class of 1978

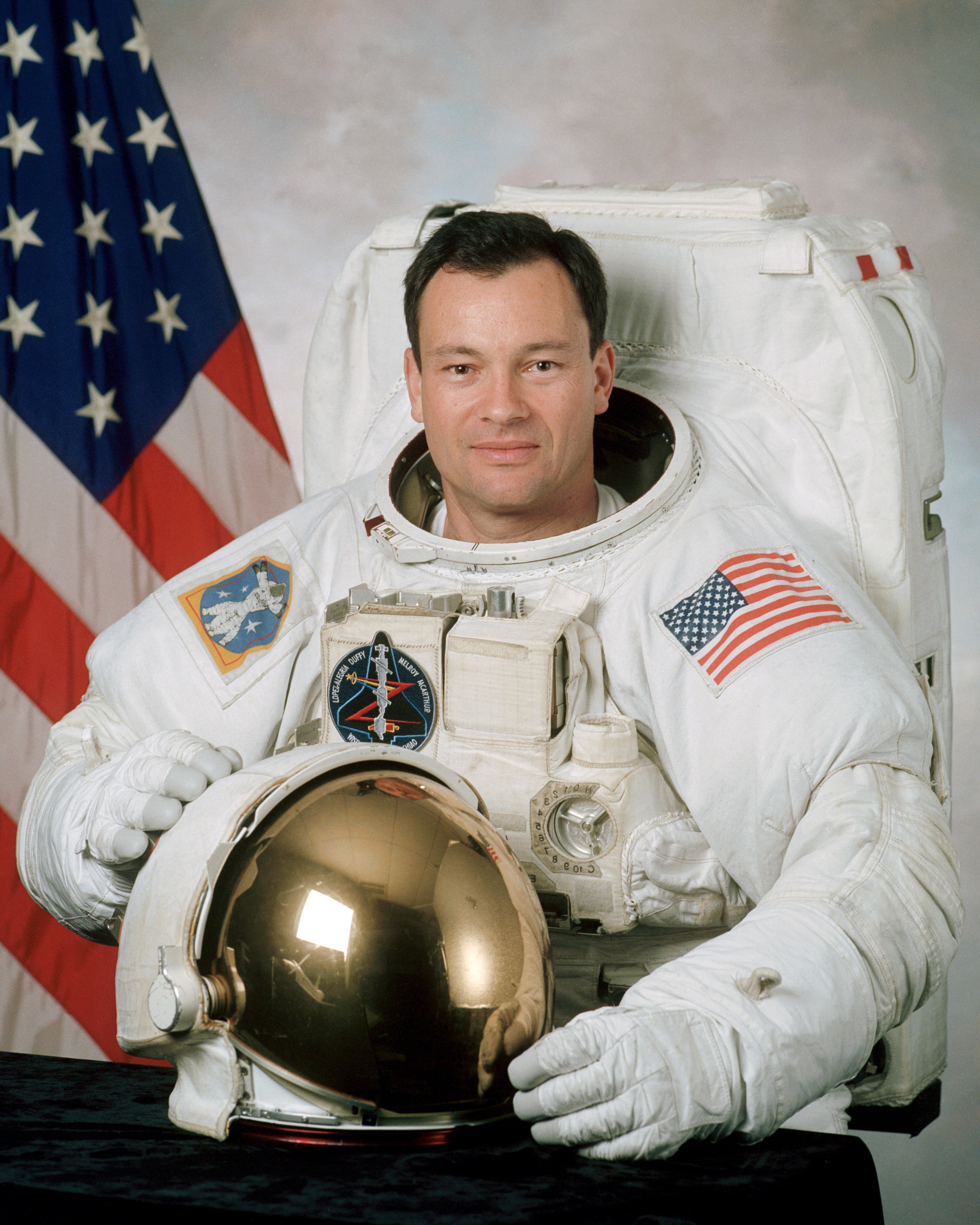
Capt. Miguel López Alegría
Class of 1980

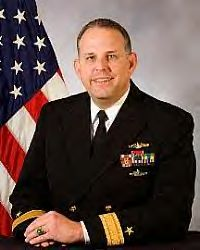
RADM Patrick H. Brady
Class of 1981

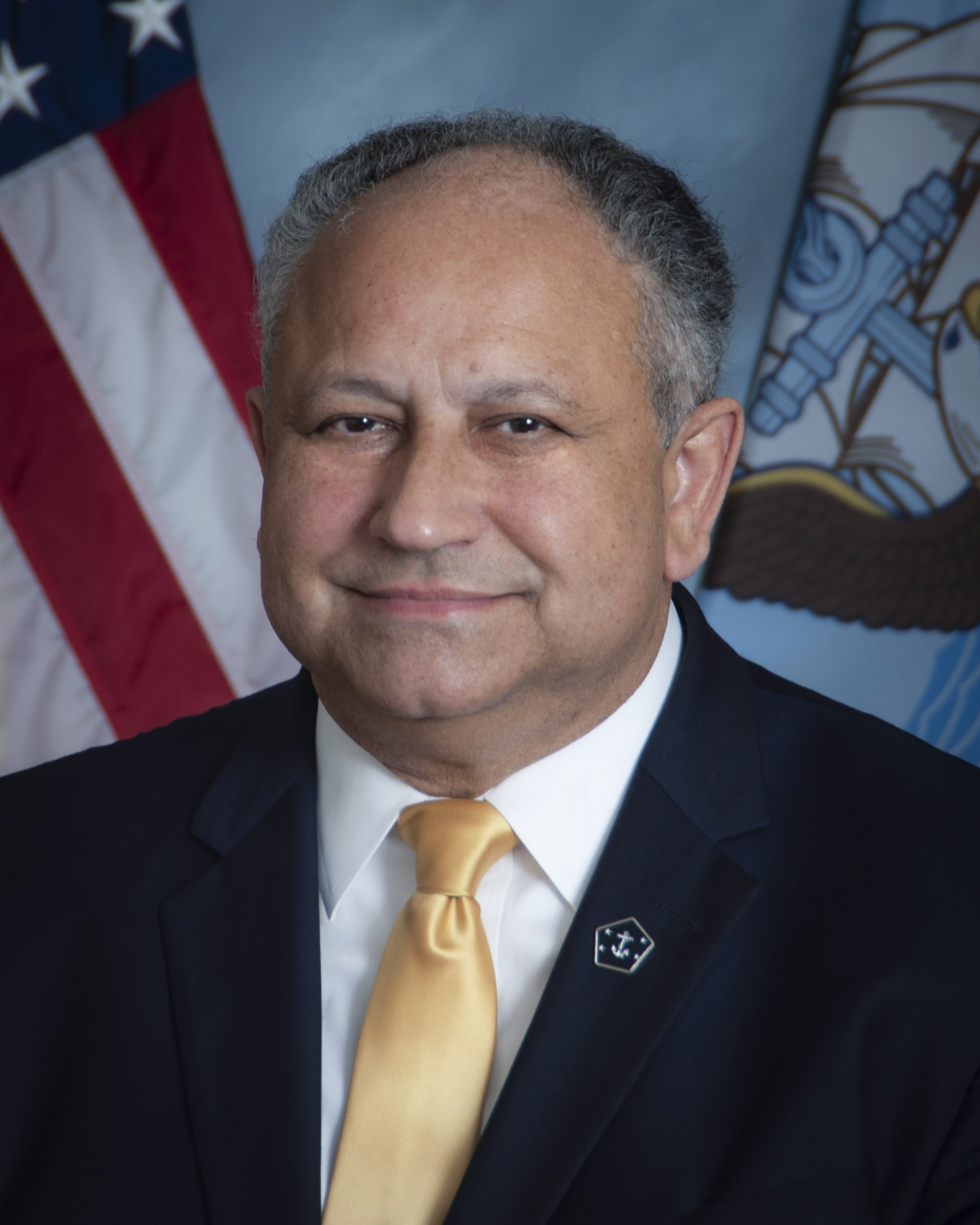
Carlos Del Toro
Class of 1983

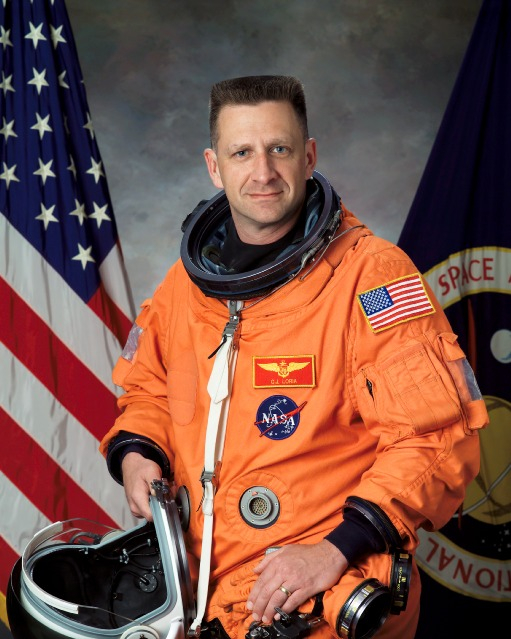
Lt. Col. Christopher J. "Gus" Loria
Class of 1983

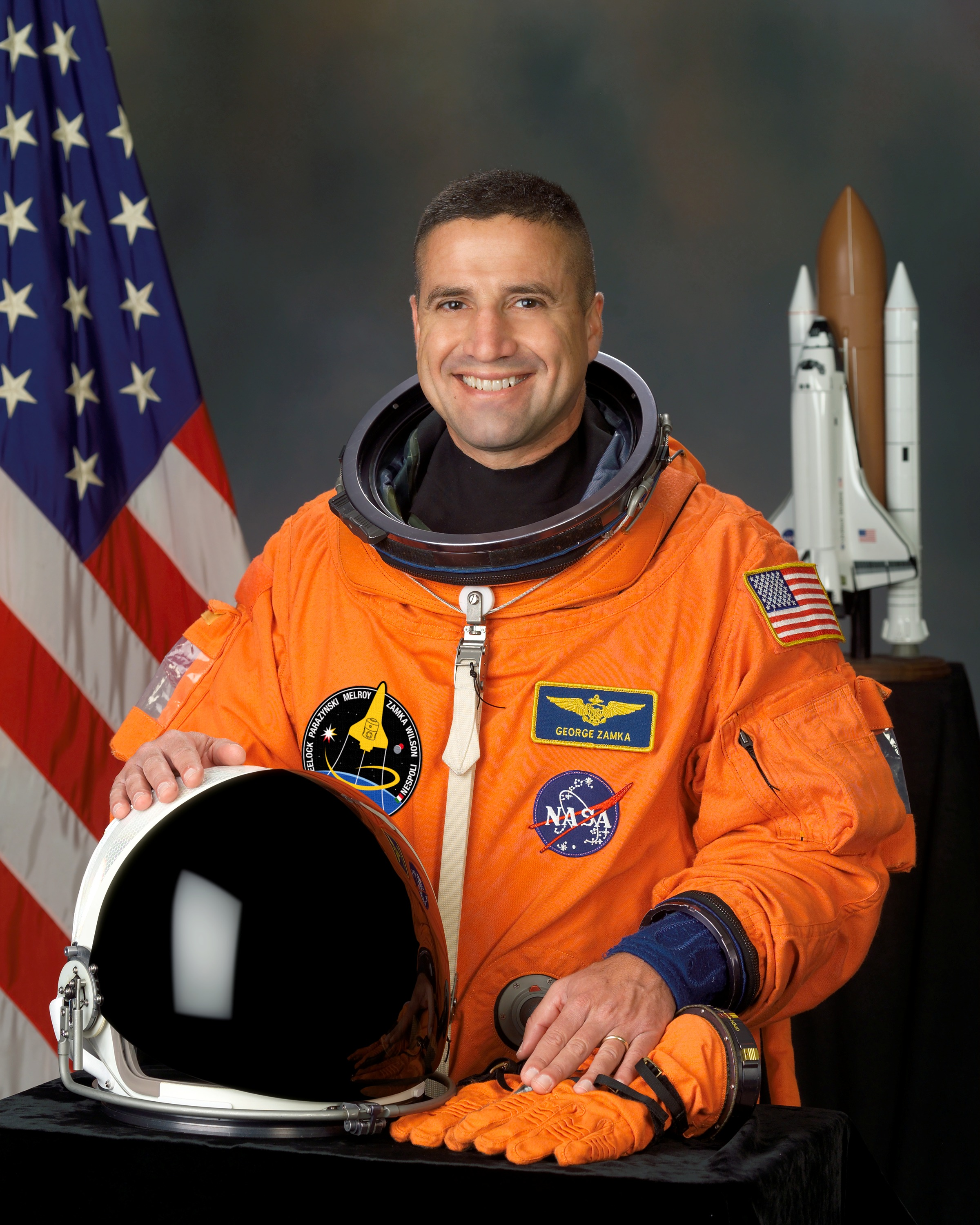
Col. George David Zamka
Class of 1984

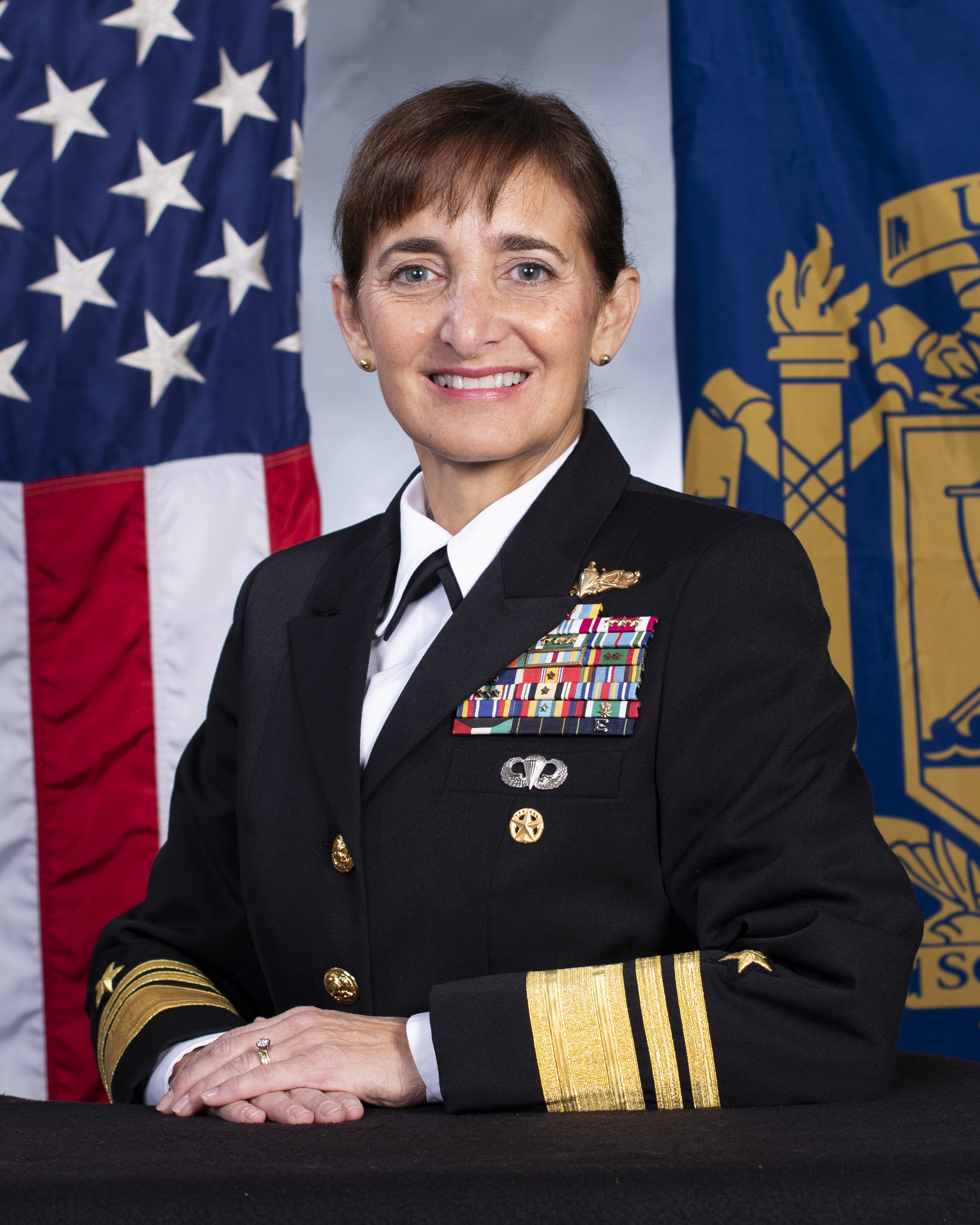
VADM Yvette M. Davids
Class of 1989

== See also ==
- Hispanic Admirals in the United States Navy
- Hispanics in the United States Navy
- Hispanics in the United States Marine Corps
- Hispanics in the United States Air Force
- Hispanics in the United States Coast Guard
- Hispanic Americans in World War II
- Hispanics in the American Civil War
- List of United States Naval Academy alumni
