= Marion Frederic Ramírez de Arellano =

Submarine commander in the United States Navy

Marion Frederic Ramirez de Arellano
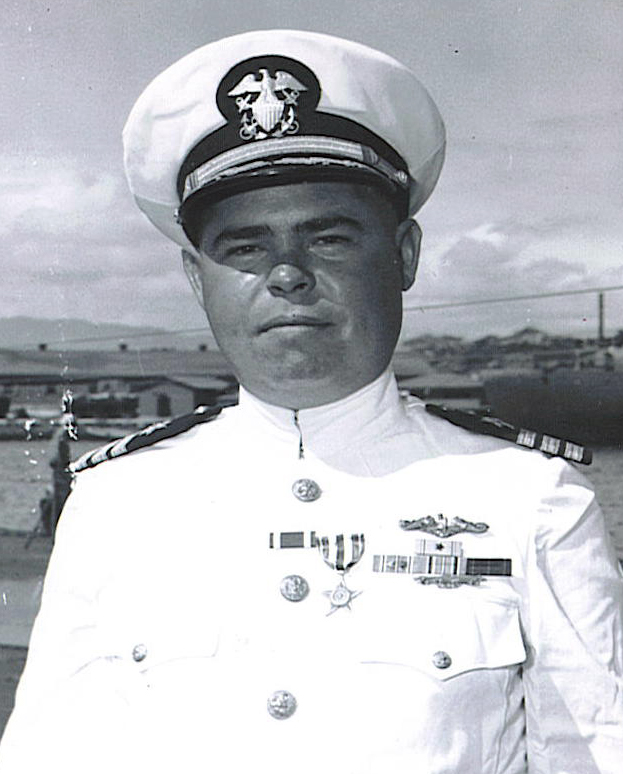
- Capt. Marion Frederic Ramirez de Arellano; First Hispanic submarine commanding officer
- Born: Marion Frederic Ramirez de Arellano Kimerer; August 5, 1913; San Juan, Puerto Rico
- Died: May 15, 1980 (aged 66); Andrews Air Force Base in Washington, D.C., U.S.
- Burial place: Arlington National Cemetery
- Military career
- Allegiance: United States of America
- Branch: United States Navy
- Service years: 1935–1961
- Rank: Captain
- Nickname: Ramrod
- Commands: USS Balao (SS-285)
- Conflicts: World War II
- Awards: Silver Star (2); Legion of Merit; Bronze Star with combat "V"

Captain Marion Frederic Ramirez de Arellano (August 5, 1913 – May 15, 1980) was a submarine commander in the United States Navy and the first Hispanic submarine commanding officer. He was awarded two Silver Stars, the Legion of Merit, and a Bronze Star for his actions against the Japanese Imperial Navy during World War II.

== Early years ==
Ramirez de Arellano (birth name: Marion Frederic Ramírez de Arellano Kimerer) was born in San Juan, Puerto Rico, to Rafael Ramirez de Arellano and Lucille Josephne Kimerer. When he was just a child, his parents moved for a short period of time to Athens, Georgia, where he began grade school. The family soon returned to the island and both his parents Rafael W. de Arellano and Lucille Kemmerer Ramirez de Arellano found employment as professors at the University of Puerto Rico at Río Piedras. Ramirez de Arellano continued his education in Puerto Rico and after he graduated from high school, he attended the University of Puerto Rico for two years.

== U.S. Naval Academy ==
Midshipman Ramirez de Arellano on the cover of "The Submarine Forces Diversity Trailblazer"

In 1931, he was appointed to the U.S. Naval Academy by Theodore Roosevelt Jr. who served as Governor of Puerto Rico from 1929 to 1932. Ramirez de Arellano excelled in sports in the Academy, earning varsity letters in soccer, tennis, and gymnastics. He also won the Society of the Cincinnati prize for highest standing in the course for the Department of Languages. He graduated from the Academy in 1935.

Upon his graduation, he was commissioned an ensign and assigned to the USS Ranger, the first ship of the United States Navy to be designed and built from the keel up as an aircraft carrier. He served aboard as gunnery officer from 1935 to 1937. From 1937 to 1938, he attended Submarine School at Groton, Connecticut.

== World War II ==
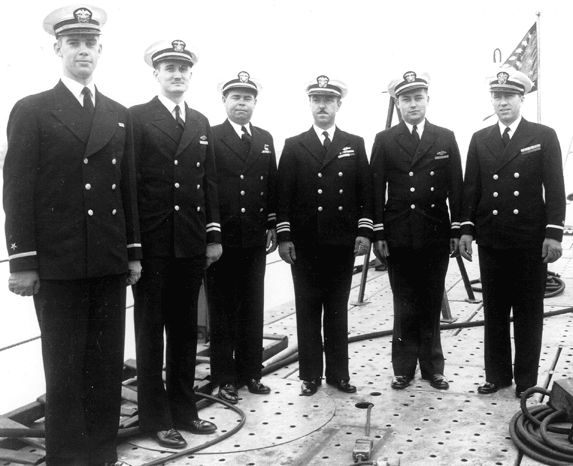
Then-Lt. Ramirez de Arellano (third from the left) posing with his fellow officers during USS Skate's commissioning on April 15, 1943.

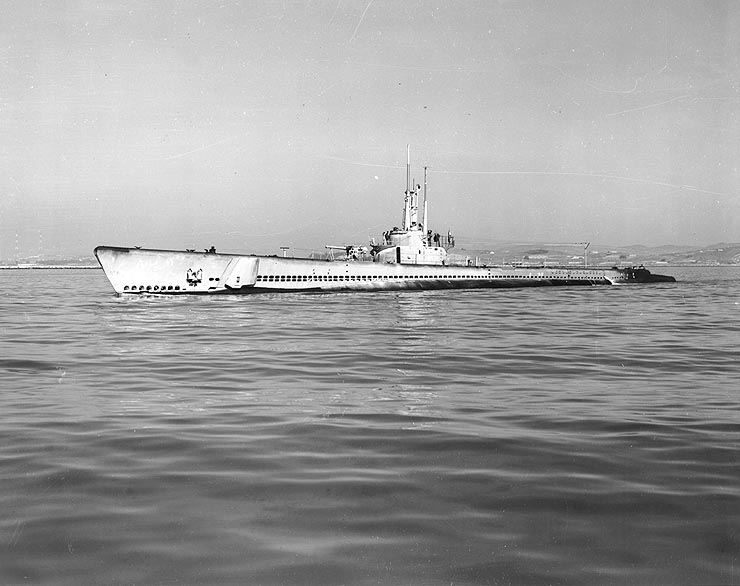
USS Balao, October 25, 1944

In 1938, Ramirez de Arellano was assigned as Division Officer of the USS Pickerel, a Porpoise-class submarine. The Pickerel was training near the Philippines when on December 8, 1941, the islands were attacked by Japan. The Pickerel was ordered to patrol the coast of the islands and on her second war patrol she sank the Kanko Maru, a Japanese vessel, in the Gulf of Davao off Mindanao. He participated in five war patrols with the Pickerel and led the effort to rescue five Navy pilots and one enlisted gunner off Wake Island. He also contributed to the sinking of two Japanese freighters and damaging a third. For his actions, he was awarded a Silver Star Medal and a Legion of Merit Medal.

After a brief stint at the Navy Yard on Mare Island, he was reassigned to the USS Skate, a Balao-class submarine. He participated in the Skate's first three war patrols and was awarded a second Silver Star Medal for his contributions in the sinking the Japanese light cruiser Agano, on his third patrol. The Agano had survived a previous torpedo attack by submarine USS Scamp.

In April 1944, Ramirez de Arellano as named Commanding Officer of the USS Balao, thus becoming the first Hispanic submarine commanding officer. He participated in his ship's war patrols 5, 6 and 7. On July 5, 1944, Ramirez de Arellano led the rescue of three downed Navy pilots in the Palau area. On December 4, 1944, the Balao departed from Pearl Harbor to patrol in the Yellow Sea. The Balao engaged and sunk the Japanese cargo ship Daigo Maru on January 8, 1945. Ramirez de Arellano was awarded a Bronze Star with Combat V and a Letter of Commendation.

In February 1945, Ramirez de Arellano worked with submarine relief crews in Submarine Division 202 and he served as Commander of Submarine Division 16.

== Post-World War II ==
In May 1946, Ramirez de Arellano was named Commanding Officer of Submarine Base, Saint Thomas, U.S. Virgin Islands. With the exception of his other two ship commands, the USS Lindenwald (1952–1954) and of the USS Thomaston (1954–1955), Ramirez de Arellano held various administrative and teaching positions — among them Assistant to War Plans Officer, Caribbean Sea Frontier, 10th Naval District (1947–1949) and in the Department of Languages, U.S/ Naval Academy (1949–1952). He was War Plans Officer, Joint U.S. Military Group in Madrid, Spain from May 1955 to June 1957 and the Deputy Director of the Inter-American Defense Board in Washington, D.C., from July 1957 to July 1961. On July 1, 1961, Captain Ramirez de Arellano retired from the Navy.

== Personal ==
Ramirez de Arellano was married to Mysie Isabel Judson, of Tacoma, with whom he had three sons. He died on May 15, 1980, at Andrews Air Force Base near Washington, D.C.

=== Miscellaneous ===
Ramirez de Arellano is described in Rick Riordan's young-adult novel The Blood of Olympus as being a great-great-uncle of the major character Reyna Ramirez-Arellano.

In 2020 Marion Frederic Ramírez de Arellano was posthumously inducted to the Puerto Rico Veterans Hall of Fame.

== Awards and decorations ==
Among Ramirez de Arellano's military decorations were the following:

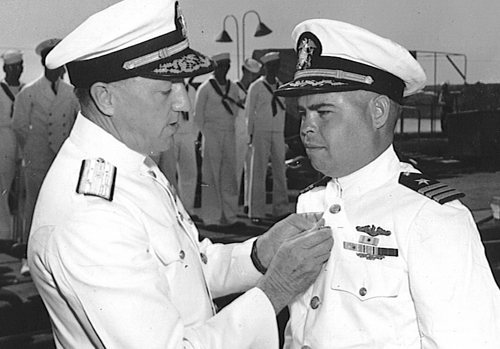
Ramirez de Arellano, then a commander, receives the Silver Star—the fourth highest decoration given by the U.S. military.

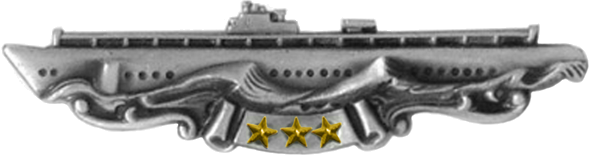

Submarine Officers Warfare insignia
Navy Distinguished Service Medal
Silver Star with one gold award star	Legion of Merit with Combat "V"	Bronze Star with Combat "V"	Navy and Marine Corps Commendation Medal with Combat "V"
Presidential Unit Citation	Navy Unit Commendation	Asiatic-Pacific Campaign Medal	World War II Victory Medal
Asiatic–Pacific Campaign Medal	World War II Victory Medal	National Defense Service Medal with one bronze service star	Navy Rifle Marksmanship Ribbon
Command at Sea insignia
Submarine Combat Patrol insignia

== See also ==
- Hispanic Admirals in the United States Navy
- List of Puerto Ricans
- Puerto Ricans in World War II
- List of Puerto Rican military personnel
- Hispanics in the United States Navy
- Hispanics in the United States Naval Academy
