= Baldomero López =

United States Marine Corps Medal of Honor recipient

Baldomero Lopez
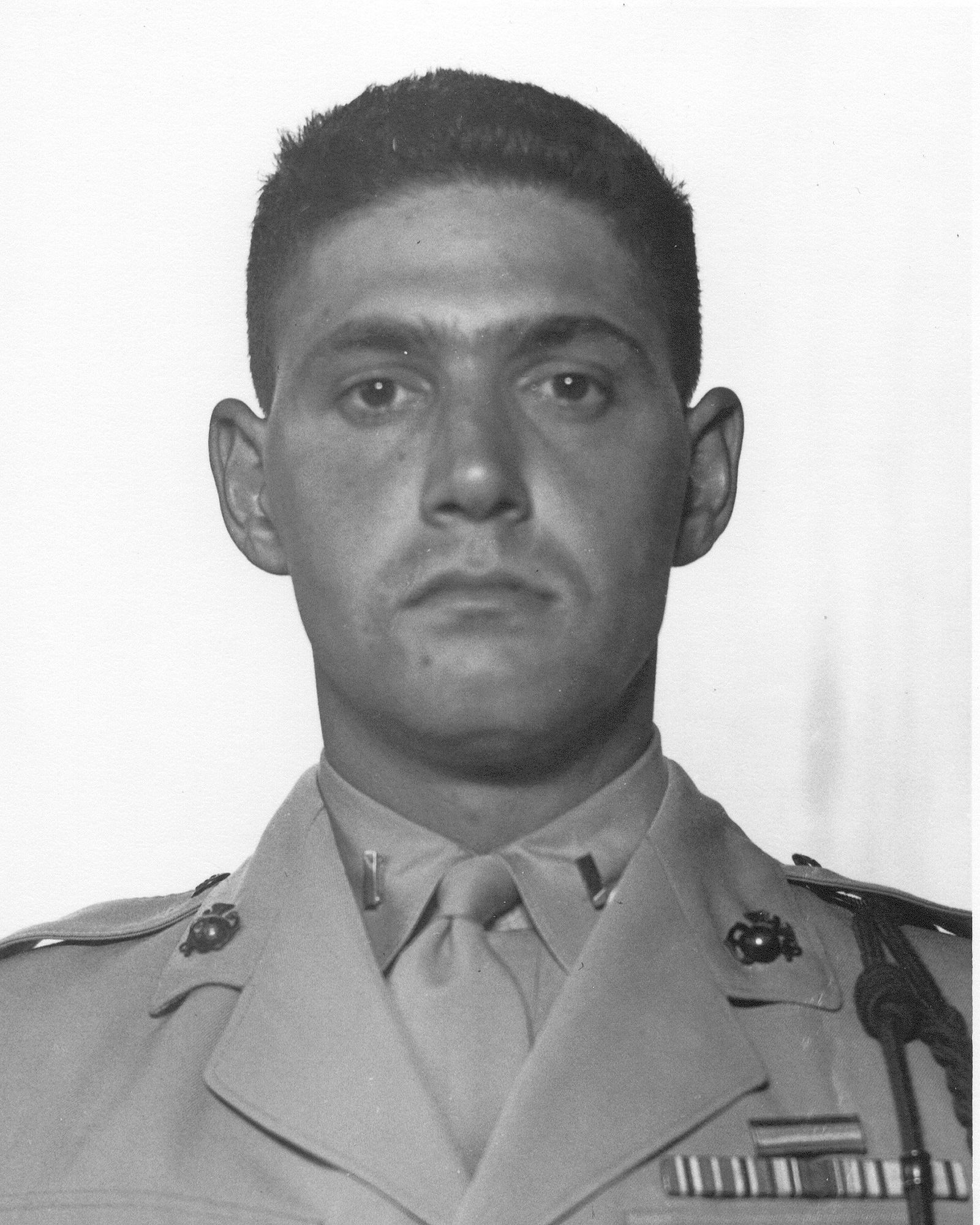
- Born: August 23, 1925; Tampa, Florida, U.S.
- Died: September 15, 1950 (aged 25); Incheon, Gyeonggi, South Korea
- Burial place: Centro Asturiano Memorial Park Cemetery, Tampa, Florida, U.S.
- Military career
- Allegiance: United States
- Branch: United States Navy; United States Marine Corps
- Service years: 1943–1947 (U.S. Navy); 1947–1950 (U.S. Marine Corps)
- Rank: First Lieutenant
- Units: Company A, 1st Battalion, 5th Marines, 1st Marine Division
- Conflicts: World War II; Korean War; Battle of Inchon †
- Awards: Medal of Honor; Purple Heart; Taegeuk Order of Military Merit (South Korea)

Baldomero López (August 23, 1925 – September 15, 1950) was a first lieutenant in the United States Marine Corps during the Korean War. He posthumously received the Medal of Honor for smothering a hand grenade with his own body during the Incheon Landing on September 15, 1950.

== Early life and education ==
López was born on August 23, 1925, in Tampa, Florida, and grew up in the neighborhood of Ybor City. His father, also named Baldomero López, had immigrated to the United States from Asturias in the north of Spain as a young man. The younger Lopez attended Hillsborough High School, where he was an accomplished basketball player and a regimental commander in the school's Junior Reserve Officers' Training Corps program. He enlisted in the United States Navy on July 8, 1943, shortly after graduating from high school, and served until June 11 of the next year.

== Military career ==
López was selected to attend the United States Naval Academy in the midst of World War II, and because of the ongoing war he and his classmates were placed in an accelerated three-year program. Upon graduating on June 6, 1947, he was commissioned a second lieutenant in the United States Marine Corps. He attended The Basic School at Quantico, Virginia, after which he became a platoon commander in the Platoon Leaders Class Training Regiment.

In 1948, López went to China, where he served as a mortar section commander and later as a rifle platoon commander at Qingdao and Shanghai. On his return from China he was assigned to Camp Pendleton, California. He was serving there when, shortly after the outbreak of the Korean War, he volunteered for duty as an infantry officer in Korea. He was promoted to the rank of first lieutenant on June 16, 1950.

=== Korean War ===
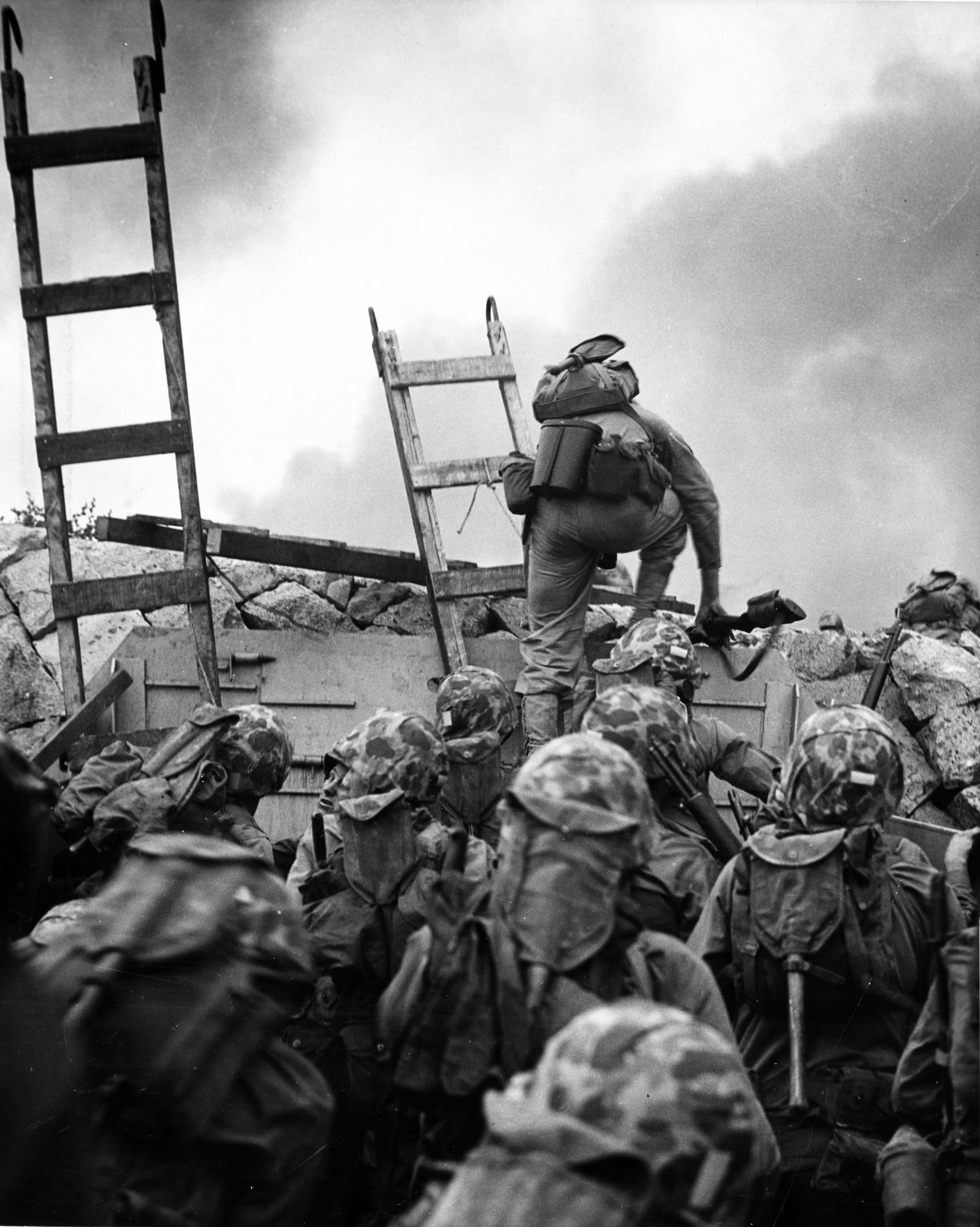
Lieutenant López leading his men under fire over the seawall at Inchon several minutes before his death.

In Korea, Lt. López served as a platoon commander in A Company, 1st Battalion, 5th Marines, 1st Marine Division (Reinforced). On September 15, 1950, he took part in the amphibious invasion of Inchon. After landing on the beach, he was captured in an iconic photograph by Marguerite Higgins as he led his men over a seawall. Moments later, while preparing to throw a hand grenade into a North Korean bunker, he was struck by automatic weapons fire in the chest and right shoulder, causing him to drop the activated device. Although seriously wounded, Lt. López crawled toward the grenade and unable to throw it because of his injuries, pulled it under his body to shield others from the blast. He was killed in the resulting explosion and was posthumously awarded the Medal of Honor. Secretary of the Navy Dan A. Kimball presented the medal to Lopez's parents during a ceremony in Washington, D.C., on August 30, 1951.

News of his death spread quickly among fellow Marines on the battlefronts. A Scripps-Howard war correspondent, Jerry Thorp, said in a news story on López's deed that he "died with the courage that makes men great."

== Medal of Honor ==
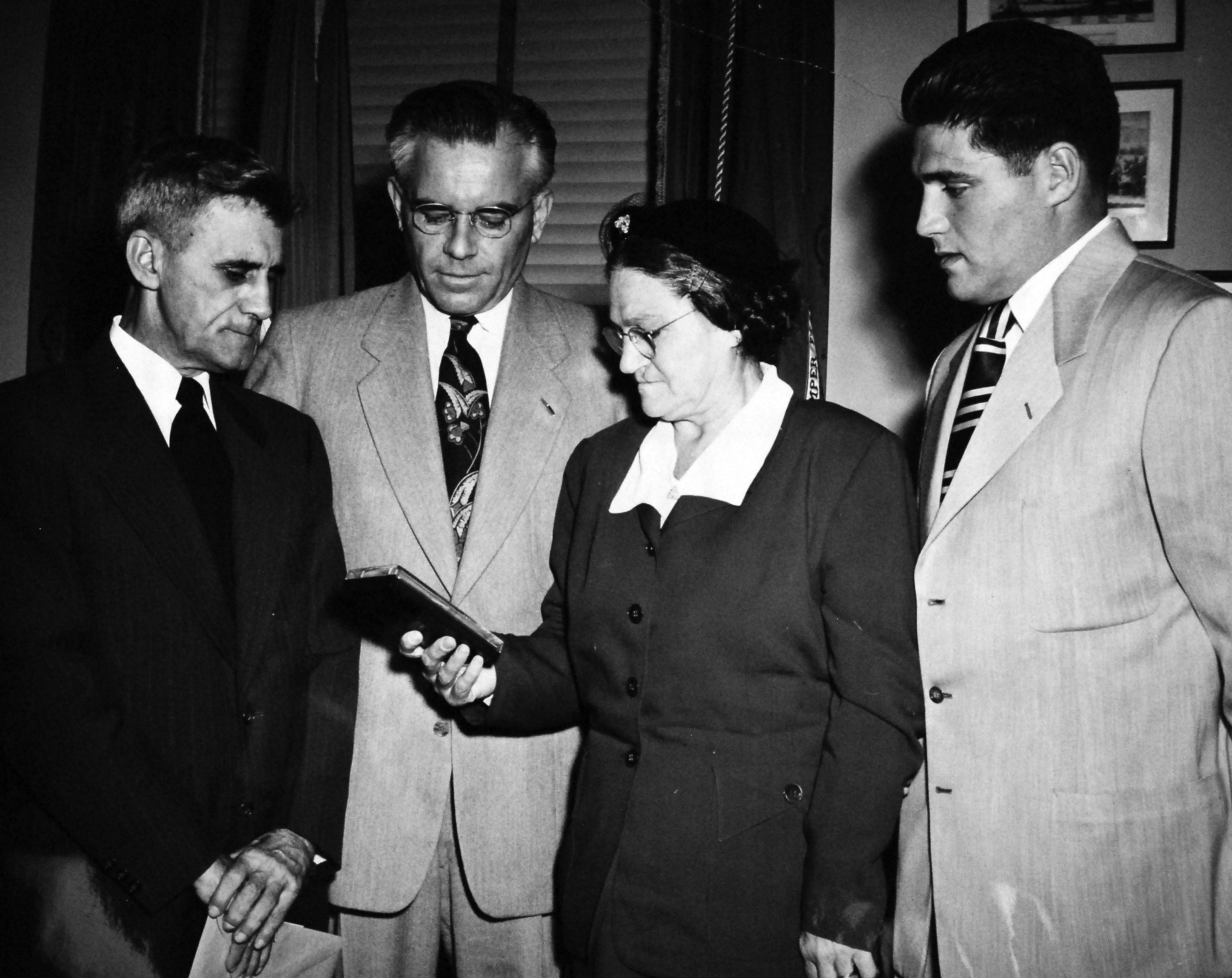
Medal of Honor presentation to the family of Baldomero López

Lopez's official Medal of Honor citation reads:

For conspicuous gallantry and intrepidity at the risk of his life above and beyond the call of duty as a Marine platoon commander of Company A, in action against enemy aggressor forces. With his platoon 1st Lt. Lopez was engaged in the reduction of immediate enemy beach defenses after landing with the assault waves. Exposing himself to hostile fire, he moved forward alongside a bunker and prepared to throw a hand grenade into the next pillbox whose fire was pinning down that sector of the beach. Taken under fire by an enemy automatic weapon and hit in the right shoulder and chest as he lifted his arm to throw, he fell backward and dropped the deadly missile. After a moment, he turned and dragged his body forward in an effort to retrieve the grenade and throw it. In critical condition from pain and loss of blood, and unable to grasp the hand grenade firmly enough to hurl it, he chose to sacrifice himself rather than endanger the lives of his men and, with a sweeping motion of his wounded right arm, cradled the grenade under him and absorbed the full impact of the explosion. His exceptional courage, fortitude, and devotion to duty reflect the highest credit upon 1st Lt. Lopez and the U.S. Naval Service. He gallantly gave his life for his country.

== Awards and decorations ==
In addition to the Medal of Honor, López's decorations include the Purple Heart, Presidential Unit Citation with one bronze star, World War II Victory Medal, China Service Medal, National Defense Service Medal, Korean Service Medal with two bronze stars and the United Nations Service Medal.

1st row	Medal of Honor	Purple Heart	Combat Action Ribbon Retroactively Awarded, 1999
2nd row	Navy Presidential Unit Citation with 1 Service star	China Service Medal	American Campaign Medal
3rd row	World War II Victory Medal	National Defense Service Medal	Korean Service Medal with 1 Campaign star
4th row	Korean Presidential Unit Citation	United Nations Service Medal Korea	Korean War Service Medal Retroactively Awarded, 2003

== Legacy ==
Several structures have been named in López's honor, including a state nursing home and a school in Seffner, Florida. A Korean War memorial at the Ed Radice Sports Complex in Tampa was opened on November 11, 2007, and dedicated to Lopez. The memorial features a rock from the beach at Incheon. A public swimming pool across from Macfarlane Park in West Tampa is named for him. The U.S. Navy's Military Sealift Command named a container ship after him, the USNS 1st Lt. Baldomero Lopez (T-AK-3010). In Bancroft Hall, the U.S. Naval Academy dormitory, a room is dedicated to him (Room No. 3021), with a display including his photo and a bronze plaque of his Medal of Honor citation. There is also the Baldomero Lopez State Veteran' nursing home in Land O'Lakes FL at 6919 Parkway Blvd. The Dining Facility at The Basic School, the U. S. Marine Corps schoolhouse López attended upon commissioning, is named after him, and features a display documenting his actions.

López's Medal of Honor remains in the possession of his extended family. On April 26, 2023, President of South Korea Yoon Suk-yeol posthumously awarded López the Taegeuk Order of Military Merit. López's nephew received the award on his behalf.

== See also ==
- List of Korean War Medal of Honor recipients
- List of Hispanic Medal of Honor recipients
- Hispanics in the United States Marine Corps
- Hispanics in the United States Naval Academy
