= Hispanic and Latino Americans =

Demographic of Americans

Estadounidenses hispanos y latinos (Spanish) Estadunidenses hispânicos e latinos (Portuguese)
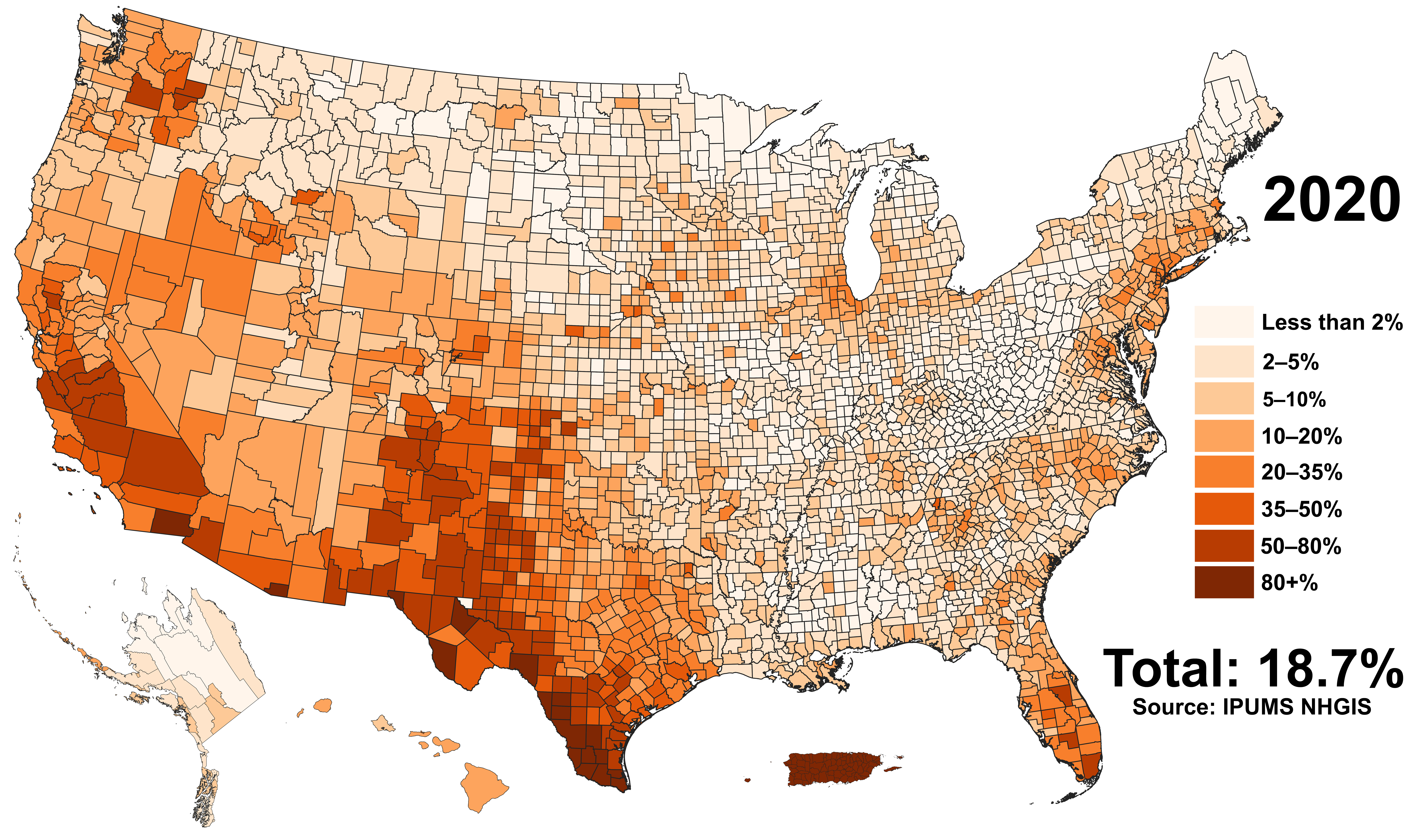
- Proportion of Hispanic and Latino Americans in each county of the fifty states, the District of Columbia, and Puerto Rico as of the 2020 United States census

Total population
- ▲65,329,087 (2020); 19.5% of the total US and Puerto Rico population (2020) ▲62,080,044 (2020); 18.7% of the total US population (2020)

Regions with significant populations
- California; Texas; Northeast megalopolis (New York/New Jersey metropolitan area, Washington, D.C. metro area, others); Florida; Southwestern United States; Midwestern industrial cities (Chicago metropolitan area, Kansas City, Milwaukee, others)

Languages
- Spanish language in the United States; American English; European Spanish; Latin American Spanish; Chicano English; Spanglish

Religion
- Catholic 43%; Unaffiliated 30%; Evangelical Protestant 15%; Non-evangelical Protestant 6%; Other 4%

Related ethnic groups
- Latin Americans; Spanish Americans; White Latin Americans; White Hispanic and Latino Americans; Afro-Latin Americans; Black Hispanic and Latino Americans; Indigenous Americans; Hispanos; Tejanos; Hispanos of New Mexico; Californios; Floridanos; Louisiana Isleños; Chicanos; Nuyoricans; Asian Hispanic and Latino Americans

Hispanic and Latino Americans are Americans who have a Hispanic or Latino American background, culture, or family origin. This demographic group includes all Americans who identify as Hispanic or Latino, regardless of race. According to annual estimates from the U.S. Census Bureau, as of July 1, 2024, the Hispanic and Latino population was estimated at 68,086,153, representing approximately 20% of the total U.S. population, making them the second-largest group in the country after the non-Hispanic White population.

"Origin" can be viewed as the ancestry, nationality group, lineage or country of birth of the person, parents or ancestors before their arrival into the United States of America. People who identify as Hispanic or Latino may be of any race, because similarly to what occurred during the colonization and post-independence of the United States, Latin American countries have had populations made up of multiracial and monoracial descendants of settlers from the metropole of a European colonial empire (in the case of Latin American countries, Spanish and Portuguese settlers, unlike the Thirteen Colonies that will form the United States, which received settlers from the United Kingdom). Hispanics and Latinos of mixed European and Indigenous ancestry are sometimes known as mestizos. In addition, there are also Indigenous peoples of the Americas (Native Americans), descendants of African slaves brought to Latin America in the colonial era, and post-independence immigrants from Europe, the Middle East, and East Asia.

As one of only two specifically-designated categories of ethnicity in the United States (under the technical label of "Hispanic or Latino"; the other category being under the technical label of "Not Hispanic or Latino"), Hispanics and Latinos form a pan-ethnicity incorporating a diversity of inter-related cultural and linguistic heritages, in which use of the Spanish language is the most important common element. The largest national origin groups of Hispanic and Latino Americans in order of population size are: Mexican, Puerto Rican, Cuban, Salvadoran, Dominican, Panamanian, Colombian, Chilean, Argentine, Guatemalan, Honduran, Costa Rican, Ecuadorian, Peruvian, Uruguayan, Bolivian, Venezuelan, Spanish, Paraguayan and Nicaraguan. Although commonly embraced by Latino communities, Brazilians are officially not considered Hispanic. The predominant origin of regional Hispanic and Latino populations varies widely in different locations across the country, for example the majority of Cuban Americans live in Florida. Over half of Hispanic Americans are of Mexican origin; in 2024, Mexican Americans made up 57.32% of all Hispanic Americans and 11.56% of the US population, with a number of 38,990,058 people. In 2012, Hispanic Americans were the second fastest-growing ethnic group by percentage growth in the United States after Asian Americans.

Hispanic Americans of mixed Indigenous descent and European (typically Spanish) descent are the second oldest racial group (after the Native Americans) to inhabit much of what is today the United States. Spain colonized large areas of what is today the American Southwest and West Coast, as well as Florida. Its holdings included all of present-day California, Nevada, Utah, Arizona, New Mexico, Texas and Florida, as well as parts of Wyoming, Colorado, Kansas and Oklahoma, all of which constituted part of the Viceroyalty of New Spain, based in Mexico City. Later, this vast territory (except Florida, which Spain ceded to the United States in 1821) became part of Mexico after its independence from Spain in 1821 and until the end of the Mexican–American War in 1848.

== Terminology ==
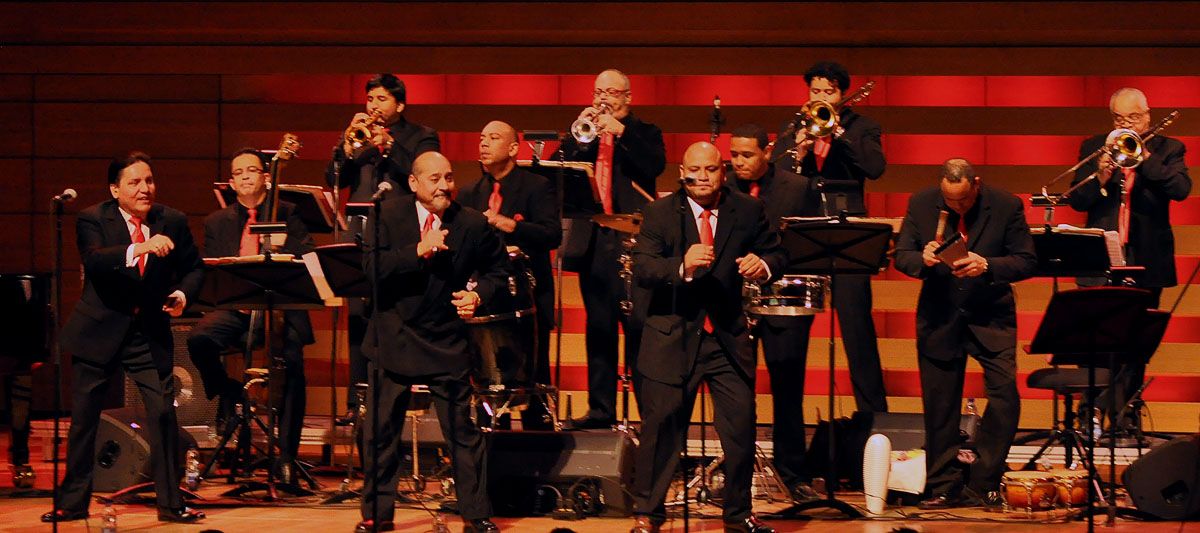
The Spanish Harlem Orchestra in Manhattan. New York City is home to nearly 3 million Latino Americans, the largest Hispanic population of any city outside Latin America and Spain.

The terms Hispanic and Latino refer to an ethnicity. Hispanic first came into popular use to refer to individuals with origins in Spanish-speaking countries after the Office of Management and Budget created the classification in 1977, as proposed by a subcommittee composed of three government employees, a Cuban, Mexican, and Puerto Rican American. The United States Census Bureau defines being Hispanic as being a member of an ethnicity, rather than being a member of a particular race and thus, people who are members of this group may also be members of any race. In a 2015 national survey of self-identified Hispanics, 56% said that being Hispanic is part of both their racial and ethnic background, while smaller numbers considered it part of their ethnic background only (19%) or racial background only (11%). Hispanics may be of any linguistic background; in a 2015 survey, 71% of American Hispanics agreed that it "is not necessary for a person to speak Spanish to be considered Hispanic/Latino". Hispanic and Latino people may share some commonalities in their language, culture, history, and heritage.

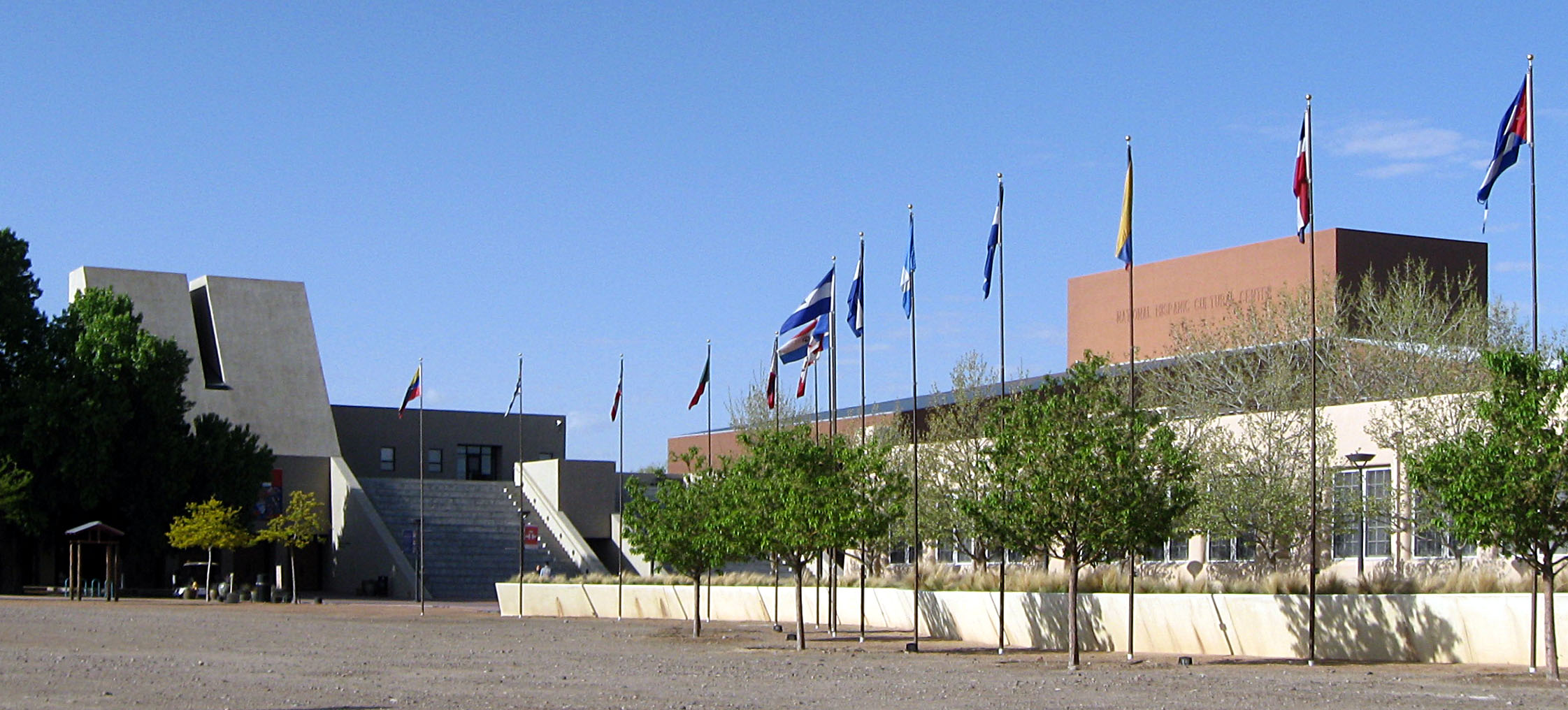
The National Hispanic Cultural Center in Albuquerque, New Mexico; Hispanics make up half of New Mexico's population.

The Smithsonian Institution defends that the term Latino should also include peoples with Portuguese roots, such as Brazilians, and not only those of Spanish-language origin. The difference between the terms Hispanic and Latino is ambiguous to some people. The US Census Bureau equates the two terms and defines them as referring exclusively to hispanic people and those from Spain or the Spanish-speaking countries of the Americas. After the Mexican–American War concluded in 1848, term Hispanic or Spanish American was primarily used to describe the Hispanos of New Mexico within the American Southwest. The 1970 United States census controversially broadened the definition to "a person of Mexican, Puerto Rican, Cuban, Dominican, South or Central American, or other Spanish culture or origin, regardless of race". This is now the common formal and colloquial definition of the term within the United States, outside of New Mexico. This definition is consistent with the 21st century usage by the US Census Bureau and OMB, as the two agencies use both terms Hispanic and Latino interchangeably. The Pew Research Center mentions that some researches defend that the term Hispanic is strictly limited to Spain, Puerto Rico, and all countries where Spanish is the only official language, whereas "Latino" could include all countries in Latin America (even Brazil regardless of the fact that Portuguese is its only official language), but not Spain and Portugal.

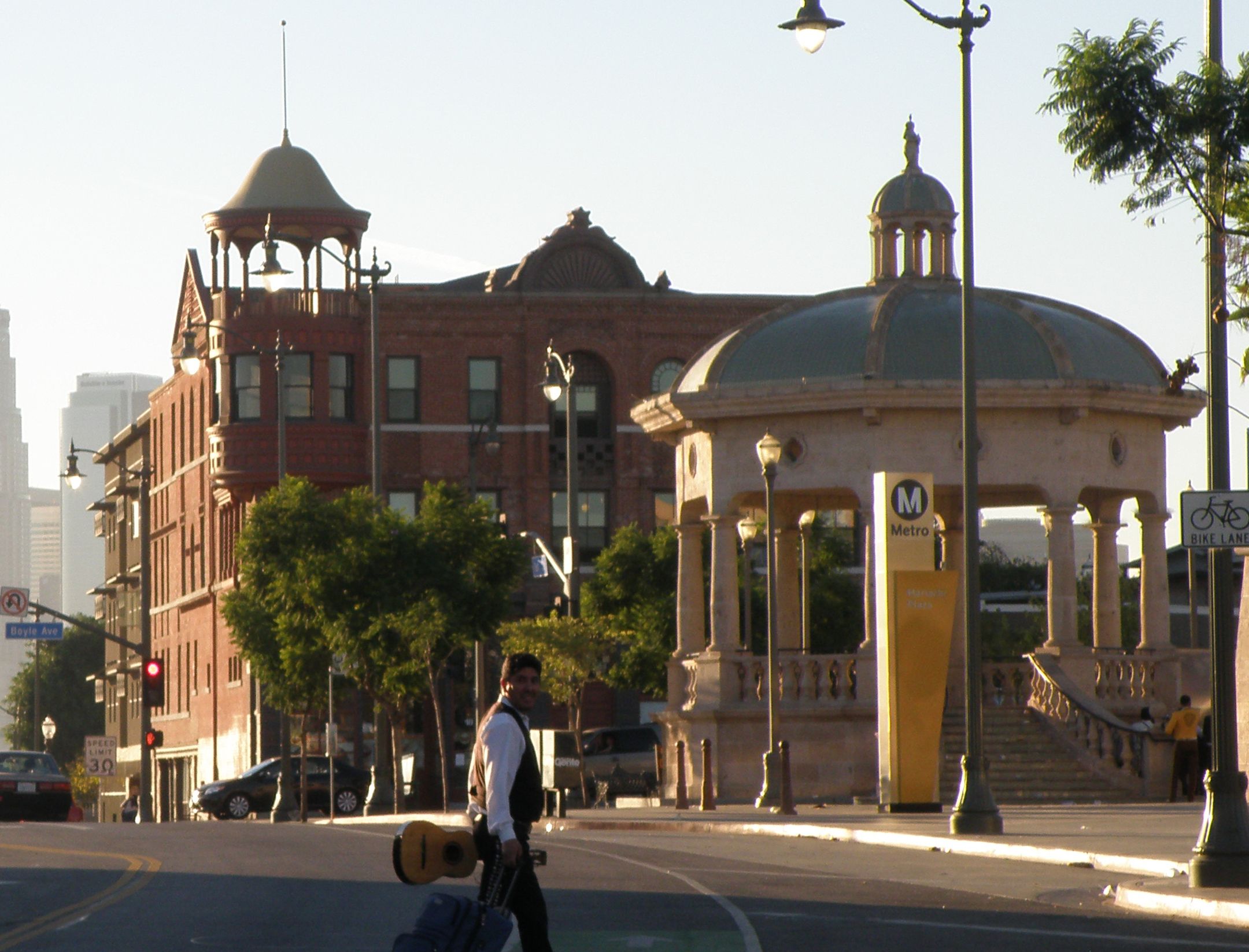
Mariachi Plaza in Los Angeles; Hispanics form the largest ethnic group in California, at 15.7 million people, or 40.4% of the total population.

The terms Latino and Latina are words from Italy and are ultimately from ancient Rome. In English, the term Latino is a condensed form of "latinoamericano", the Spanish term for a Latin American, or someone who comes from Latin America. The term Latino has developed a number of definitions. This definition, as a "male Latin American inhabitant of the United States", is the oldest definition which is used in the United States, it was first used in 1946. Under this definition a Mexican American or Puerto Rican, for example, is both a Hispanic and a Latino. In the United States, Brazilian Americans are officially not considered "Latino", as they are for the most part descended from immigrants from a non-Hispanic country, unless they happen to have had recent history in a Latin American country.

Preference of use between the terms among Hispanics in the United States often depends on where users of the respective terms reside. Those in the Eastern United States tend to prefer the term Hispanic, whereas those in the West tend to prefer Latino.

The US ethnic designation Latino is abstracted from the longer form latinoamericano. The element Latino- is actually an indeclinable, compositional form in -o (i.e. an elemento compositivo) that is employed to coin compounded formations (similar as franco- in francocanadiense 'French-Canadian', or ibero- in iberorrománico, etc.).

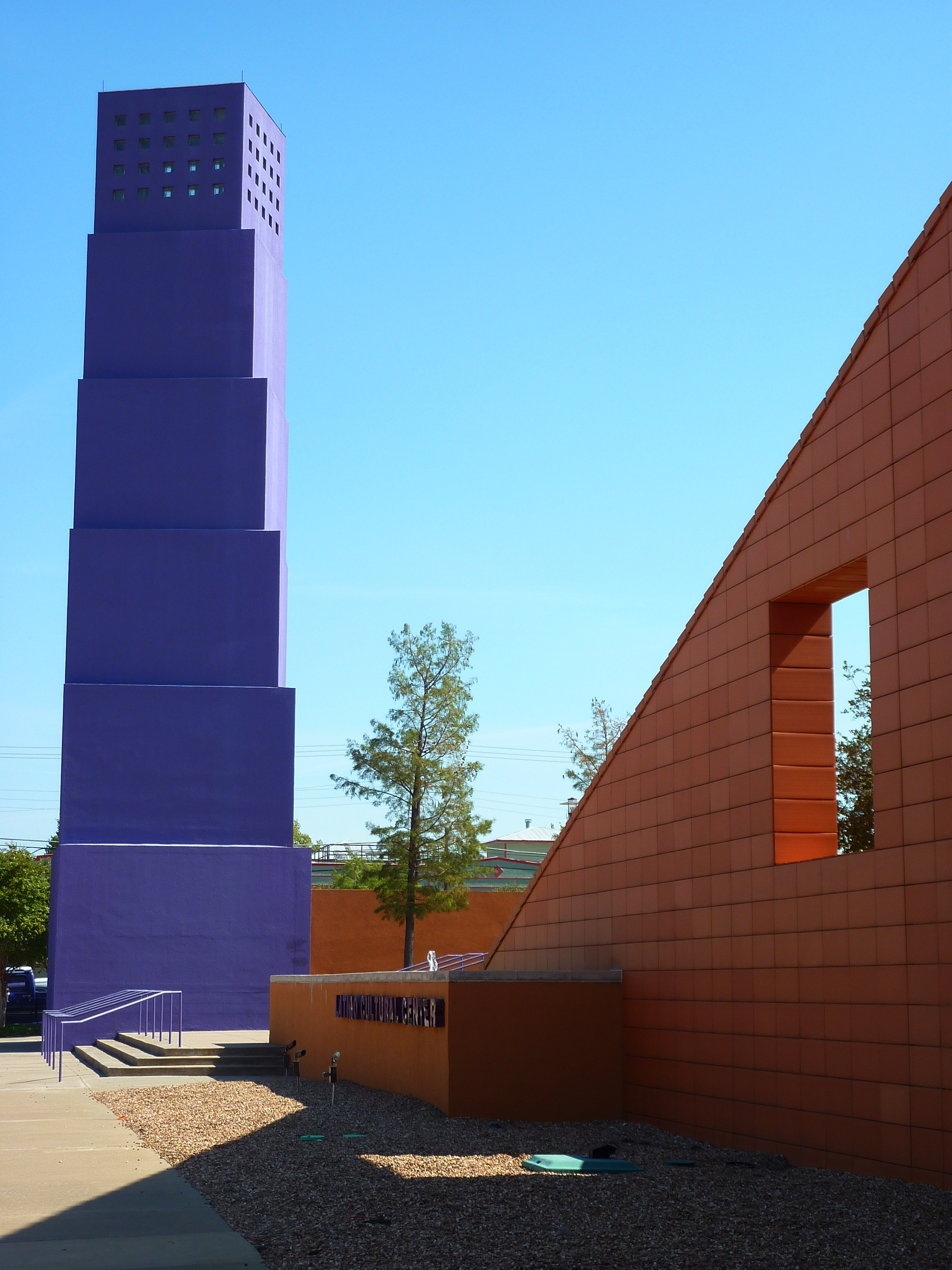
The Latino Cultural Center in Dallas; Hispanics are the largest ethnic group in Texas, making up 11.4 million people, or 39.3% of the population.

The term Latinx (and similar neologism Xicanx) have gained some usage. The adoption of the X would be "[r]eflecting new consciousness inspired by more recent work by LGBTQI and feminist movements, some Spanish-speaking activists are increasingly using a yet more inclusive "x" to replace the "a" and "o", in a complete break with the gender binary. Among the advocates of the term LatinX, one of the most frequently cited complaints of gender bias in the Spanish language is that a group of mixed or unknown gender would be referred to as Latinos, whereas Latinas refers to a group of women only (but this is changed immediately to Latinos, if even a single man joins this female group). A 2020 Pew Research Center survey found that about 3% of Hispanics use the term (mostly women), and only around 23% have even heard of the term. Of those, 65% said it should not be used to describe their ethnic group. Another gender neutral term, like LatinX, is Latine. Though "Latinx" is quite challenging to say in Spanish, "Latine" is easy. Spanish speakers are increasingly adopting this term, which originated in Spanish-speaking countries.

Some have pointed out that the term "Latino" refers to a pan-ethnic identity, one that spans a range of races, national origins, and linguistic backgrounds. "Terms like Hispanic and Latino do not fully capture how we see ourselves", says Geraldo Cadava, an associate professor of history and Hispanic studies at Northwestern University.

According to a 2020 American Community Survey data, more than two-thirds of Brazilians in the U.S. described themselves as Hispanic or Latino. In 2017, a small minority of Portuguese Americans (2%), and the Filipino Americans (1%) self-identified as Hispanic.

== History ==
=== 16th and 17th centuries ===
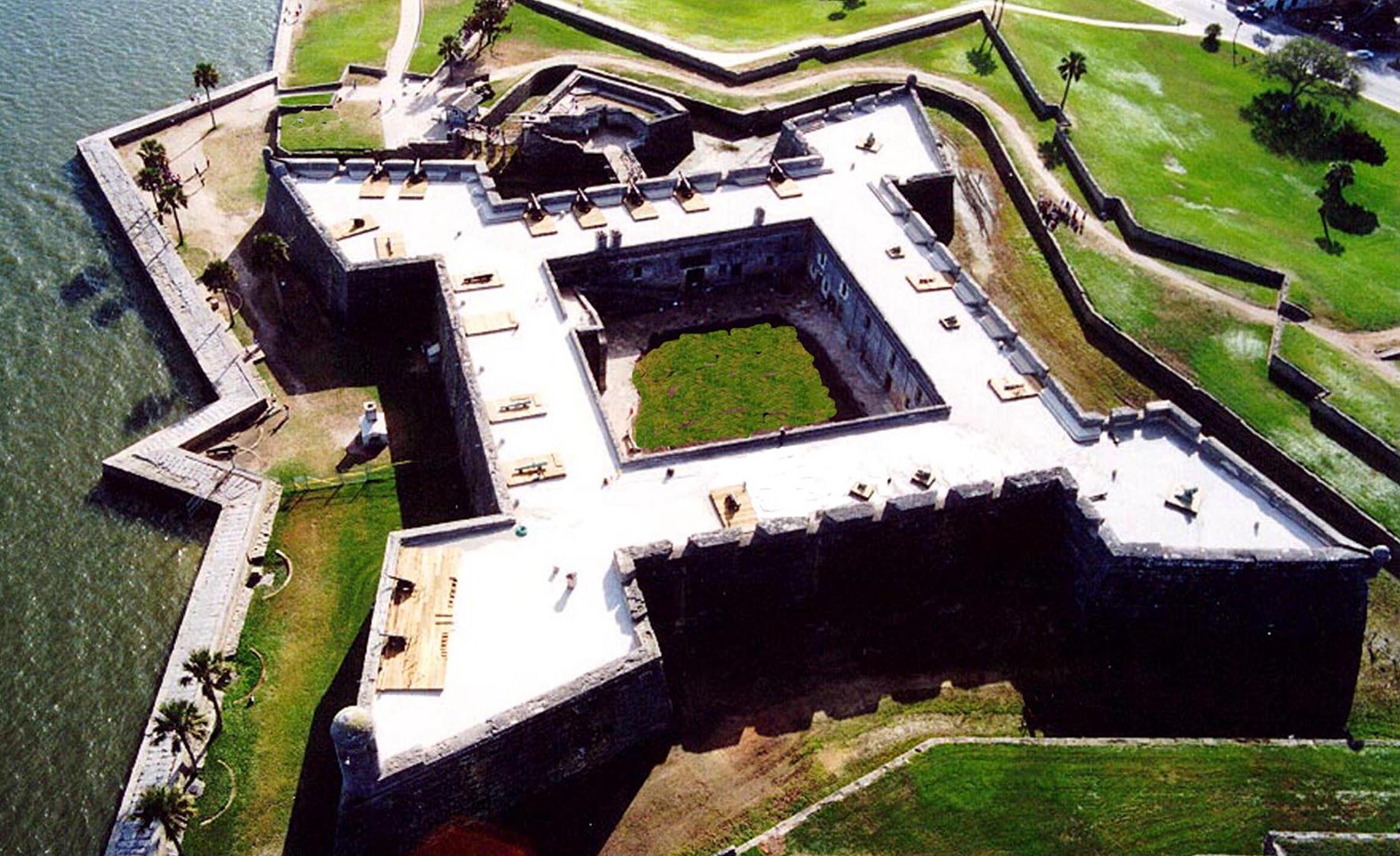
Founded by the Spanish in 1565, St. Augustine, Florida is the oldest continuously inhabited European-established settlement in the contiguous United States.

Explorers were pioneers in the territory of the present-day United States. The first confirmed European landing in the continental United States was by Juan Ponce de León, who landed in 1513 at a lush shore he christened La Florida. In the next three decades, the small numbers of Spanish individuals became the first Europeans to reach the Appalachian Mountains, the Mississippi River, the Grand Canyon and the Great Plains. Ships sailed along the Atlantic Coast, penetrating to present-day Bangor, Maine, and up the Pacific Coast as far as Oregon. From 1528 to 1536, Álvar Núñez Cabeza de Vaca and three fellows (including an African named Estevanico), from a Spanish expedition that foundered, journeyed from Florida to the Gulf of California. In 1540, Hernando de Soto undertook an extensive exploration of the present United States.

Also in 1540, Francisco Vásquez de Coronado led 2,000 mostly Mexican natives across today's Arizona–Mexico border and traveled as far as central Kansas, close to the exact geographic center of what is now the continental United States. Other Spanish explorers of the US territory include, among others: Alonso Alvarez de Pineda, Lucas Vázquez de Ayllón, Pánfilo de Narváez, Sebastián Vizcaíno, Gaspar de Portolà, Pedro Menéndez de Avilés, Álvar Núñez Cabeza de Vaca, Tristán de Luna y Arellano, and Juan de Oñate, and non-Spanish explorers working for the Spanish Crown, such as Juan Rodríguez Cabrillo.

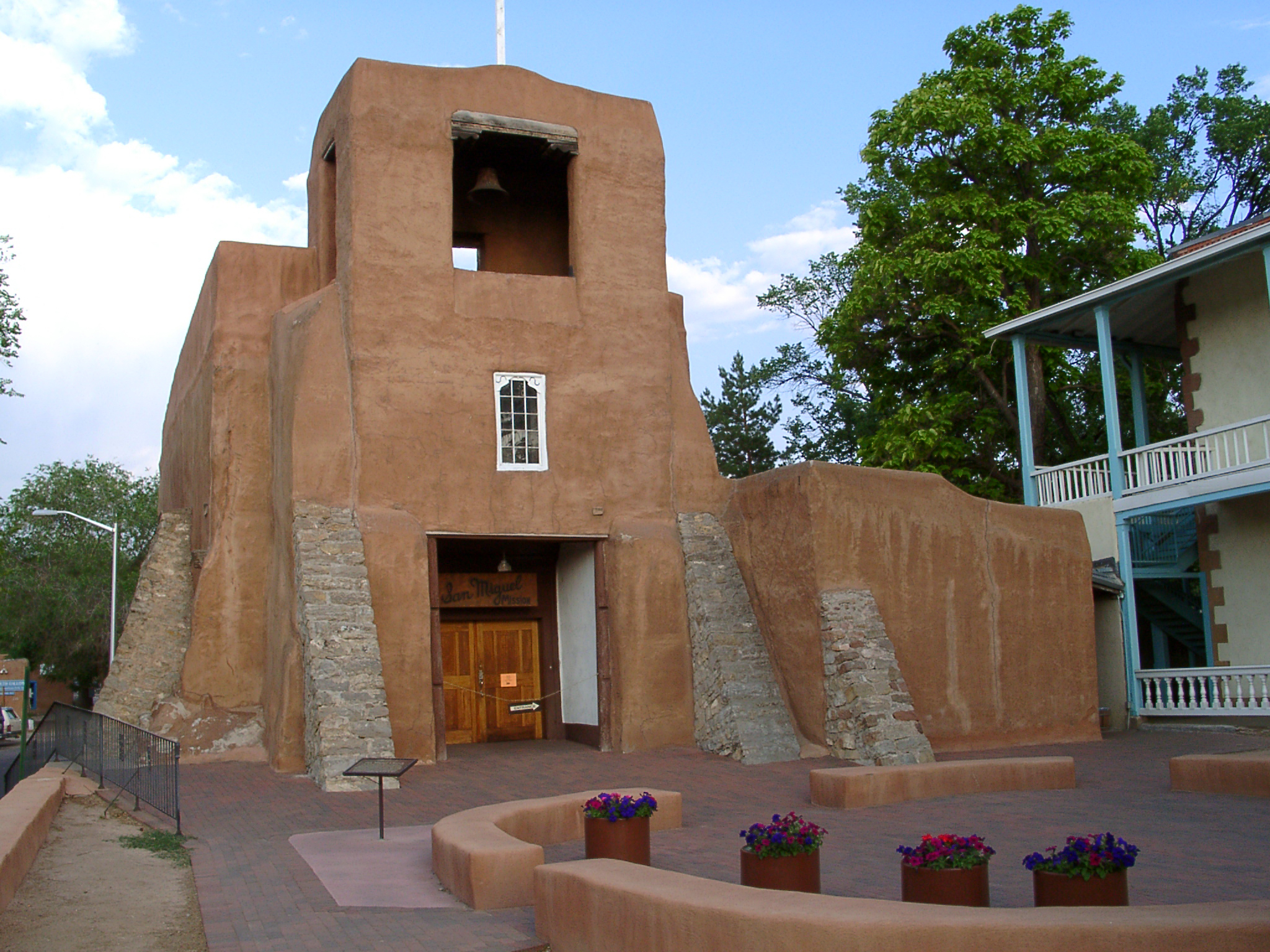
San Miguel Chapel, built in 1610 in Santa Fe, New Mexico, is the oldest church structure in the United States.

In 1565, the Spanish created the first permanent European settlement in the continental United States, at St. Augustine, Florida. Spanish missionaries and colonists founded settlements including in the present-day Santa Fe, New Mexico, El Paso, San Antonio, Tucson, Albuquerque, San Diego, Los Angeles, and San Francisco.

=== 18th and 19th centuries ===
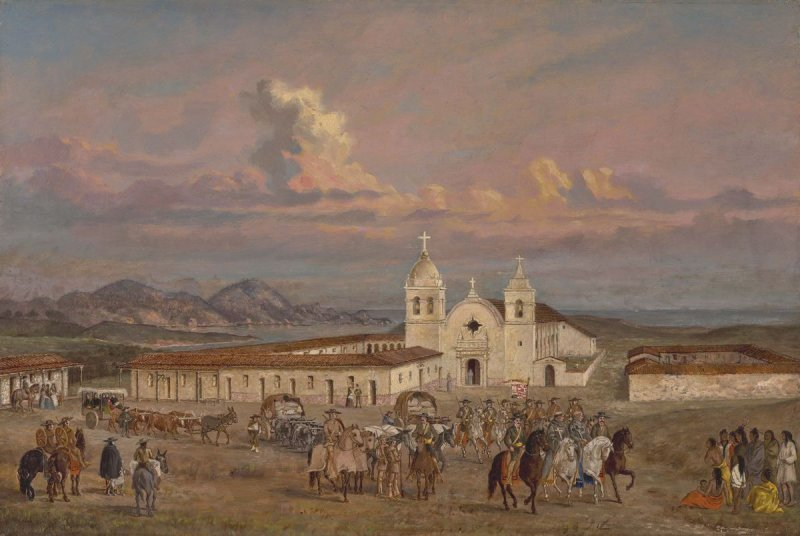
Mission San Carlos Borromeo de Carmelo, established in 1770, was the headquarters of the Californian mission system from 1797 until 1833.

As late as 1783, at the end of the American Revolutionary War (a conflict in which Spain aided and fought alongside the rebels), Spain held claim to roughly half the territory of today's continental United States. From 1819 to 1848, the United States increased its area by roughly a third at Spanish and Mexican expense, acquiring the present-day U.S. states of California, Texas, Nevada, Utah, most of Colorado, New Mexico and Arizona, and parts of Oklahoma, Kansas, and Wyoming through the Treaty of Guadalupe Hidalgo after the Mexican-American War, as well as Florida through the Adams-Onís treaty, and the U.S. territory of Puerto Rico through the Spanish-American War in 1898. Many Latinos residing in those regions during that period gained U.S. citizenship. Nonetheless, many long-established Latino residents faced significant difficulties post-citizenship. With the arrival of Anglo-Americans in these newly incorporated areas, Latino inhabitants struggled to maintain their land holdings, political influence, and cultural traditions.

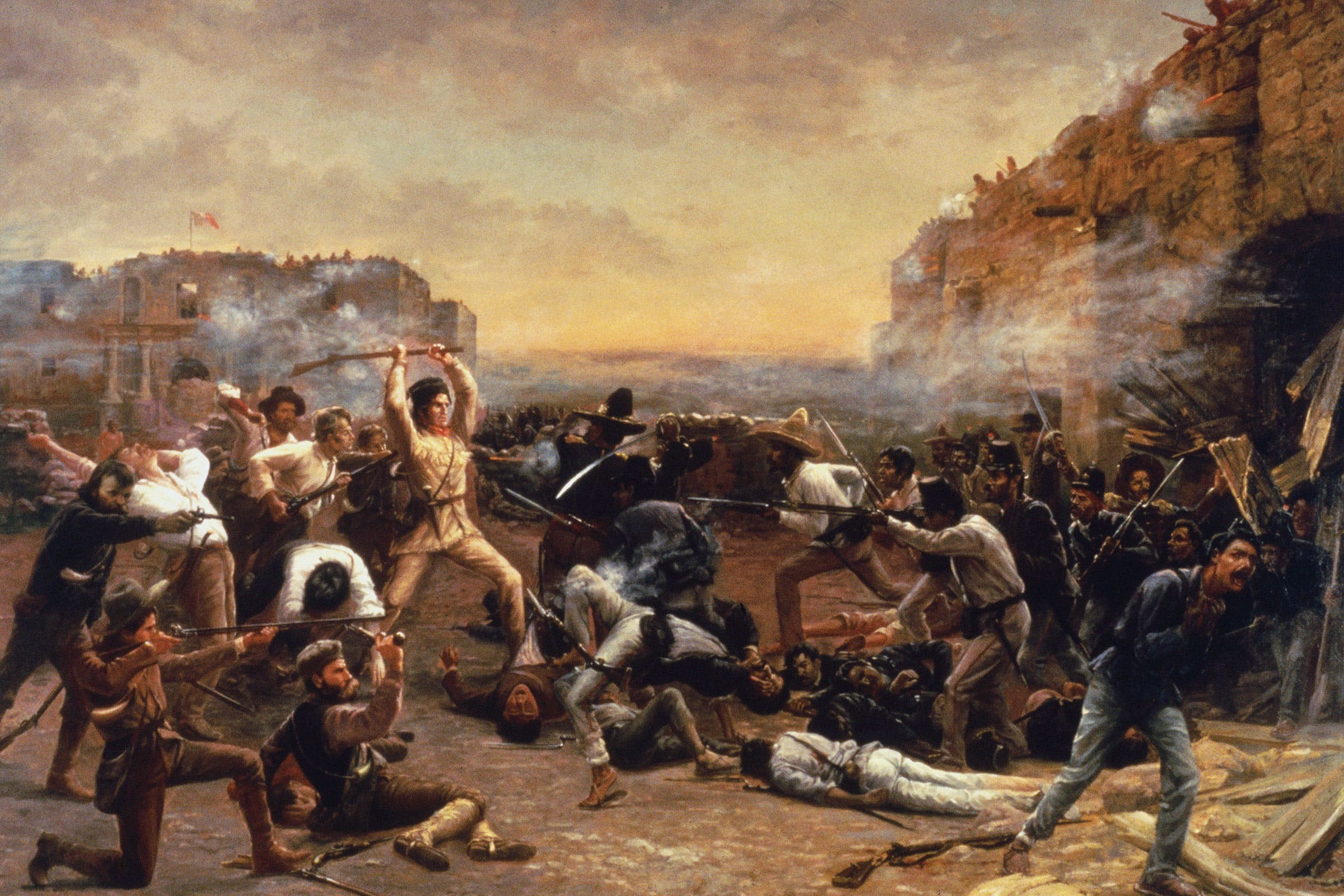
The 1836 Battle of the Alamo, part of the Texas Revolution, was fought between forces of Mexico and the Republic of Texas.

Many Hispanic natives lived in the areas that the United States acquired, and a new wave of Mexican, Central American, Caribbean, and South American immigrants had moved to the United States for new opportunities. This was the beginning of a demographic that would rise dramatically over the years.

=== 20th and 21st centuries ===
During the 20th and 21st centuries, Hispanic immigration to the United States increased markedly following changes to the immigration law in 1965. During the World Wars, Hispanic Americans and immigrants had helped stabilize the American economy from falling due to the industrial boom in the Midwest in states such as Michigan, Ohio, Indiana, Illinois, Iowa, Wisconsin, and Minnesota. While a percentage of Americans had fled their jobs for the war, Hispanics had taken their jobs in the Industrial world. This can explain why there is such a high concentration of Hispanic Americans in Metro Areas such as the Chicago-Elgin-Naperville, Detroit-Warren-Dearborn, and Cleveland-Elyria areas.

Hispanic contributions in the historical past and present of the United States are addressed in more detail below (See Notables and their contributions). To recognize the current and historic contributions of Hispanic Americans, on September 17, 1968, President Lyndon B. Johnson designated a week in mid-September as National Hispanic Heritage Week, with Congress's authorization. In 1988, President Ronald Reagan extended the observance to a month, designated National Hispanic Heritage Month. Hispanic Americans became the largest minority group in 2004.

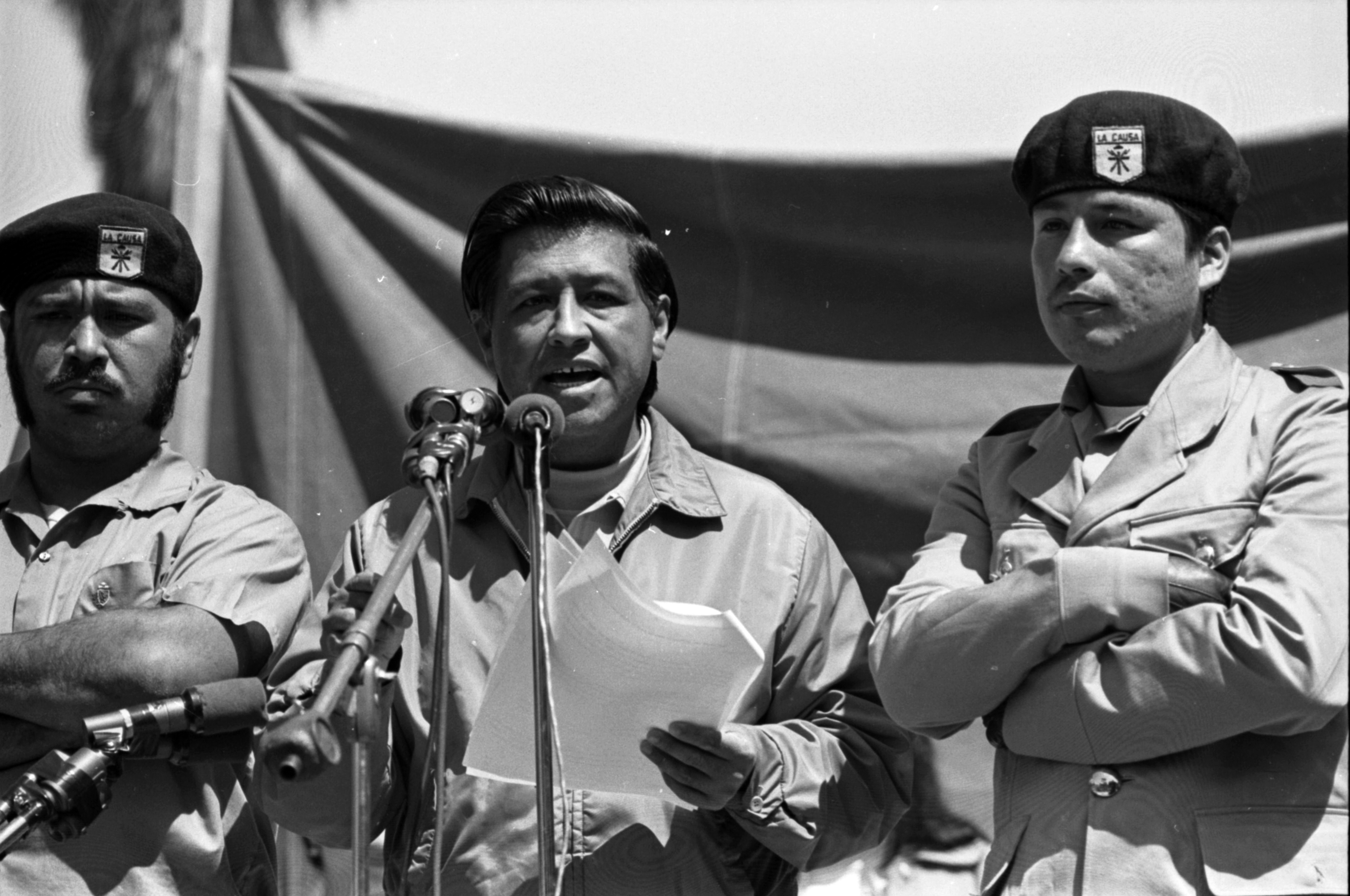
Civil rights activist Cesar Chavez, flanked by Brown Berets, at a 1971 rally during the Chicano movement

== Demographics ==
Hispanic Americans population pyramid in 2020

Hispanics have been tracked across time using a variety of proxies before the official introduction of the Ethnicity question in the US census. In 1930, people of the Mexican 'race' were enumerated as a separate category, with estimates produced by the census bureau that year for 1920 and 1910. From 1940 to 1970, the Spanish 'mother tongue' was used, as well as from 1950 to 1980 Spanish surname was additionally utilised.

As of 2020, Hispanics accounted for 19–20% of the US population, or 62–65 million people. The US Census Bureau later estimated that Hispanics were under-counted by 5.0% or 3.3 million persons in the US census, which explains the 3 million range in the number above. In contrast, Whites were over-counted by about 3 million. The Hispanic growth rate over the April 1, 2000 to July 1, 2007, period was 28.7%—about four times the rate of the nation's total population growth (at 7.2%). The growth rate from July 1, 2005, to July 1, 2006, alone was 3.4%—about three and a half times the rate of the nation's total population growth (at 1.0%). Based on the 2010 census, Hispanics are now the largest minority group in 191 out of 366 metropolitan areas in the United States. The projected Hispanic population of the United States for July 1, 2050 is 132.8 million people, or 30.2% of the nation's total projected population on that date.

=== Geographic distribution ===
Hispanic and Latino American population distribution over time

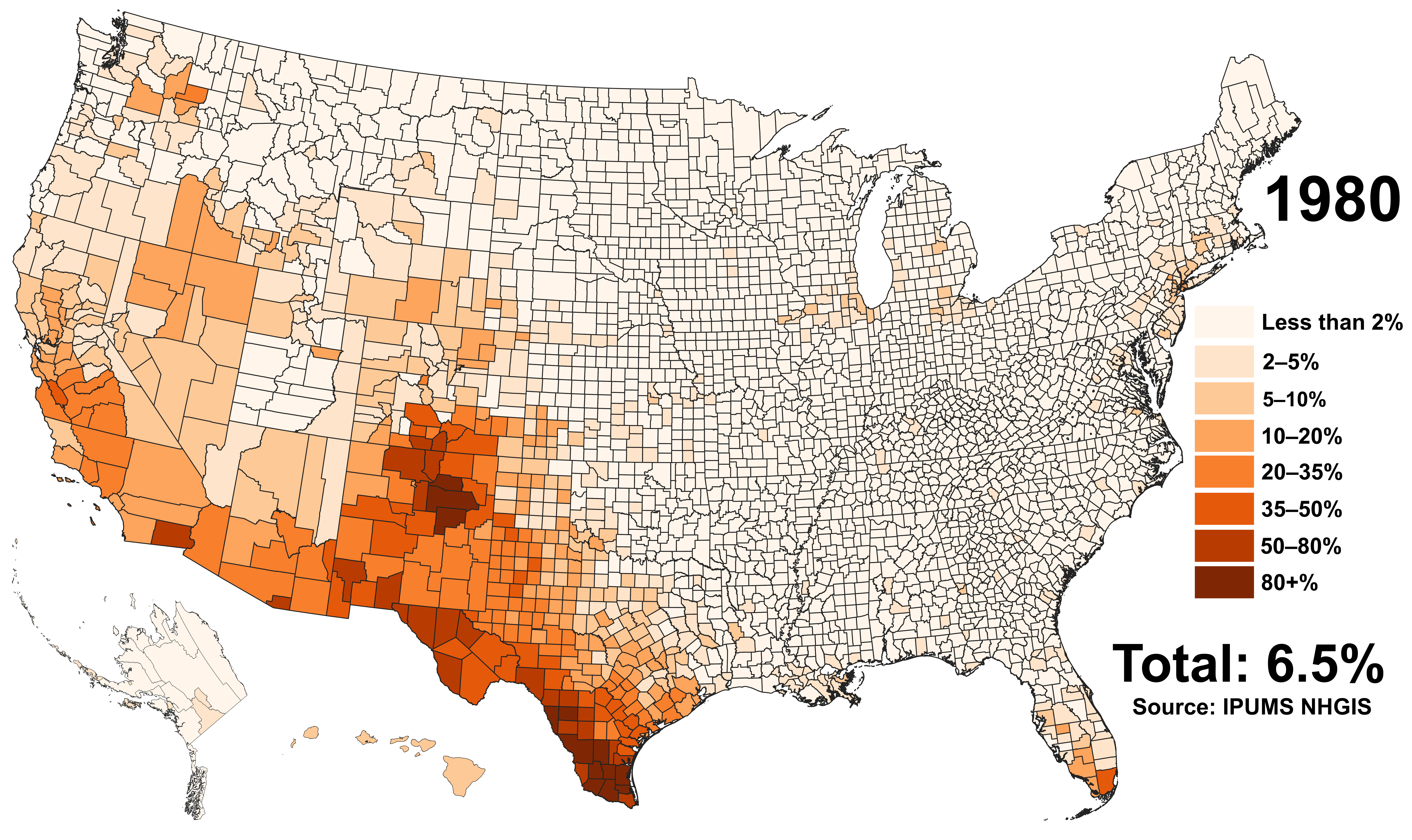
1980

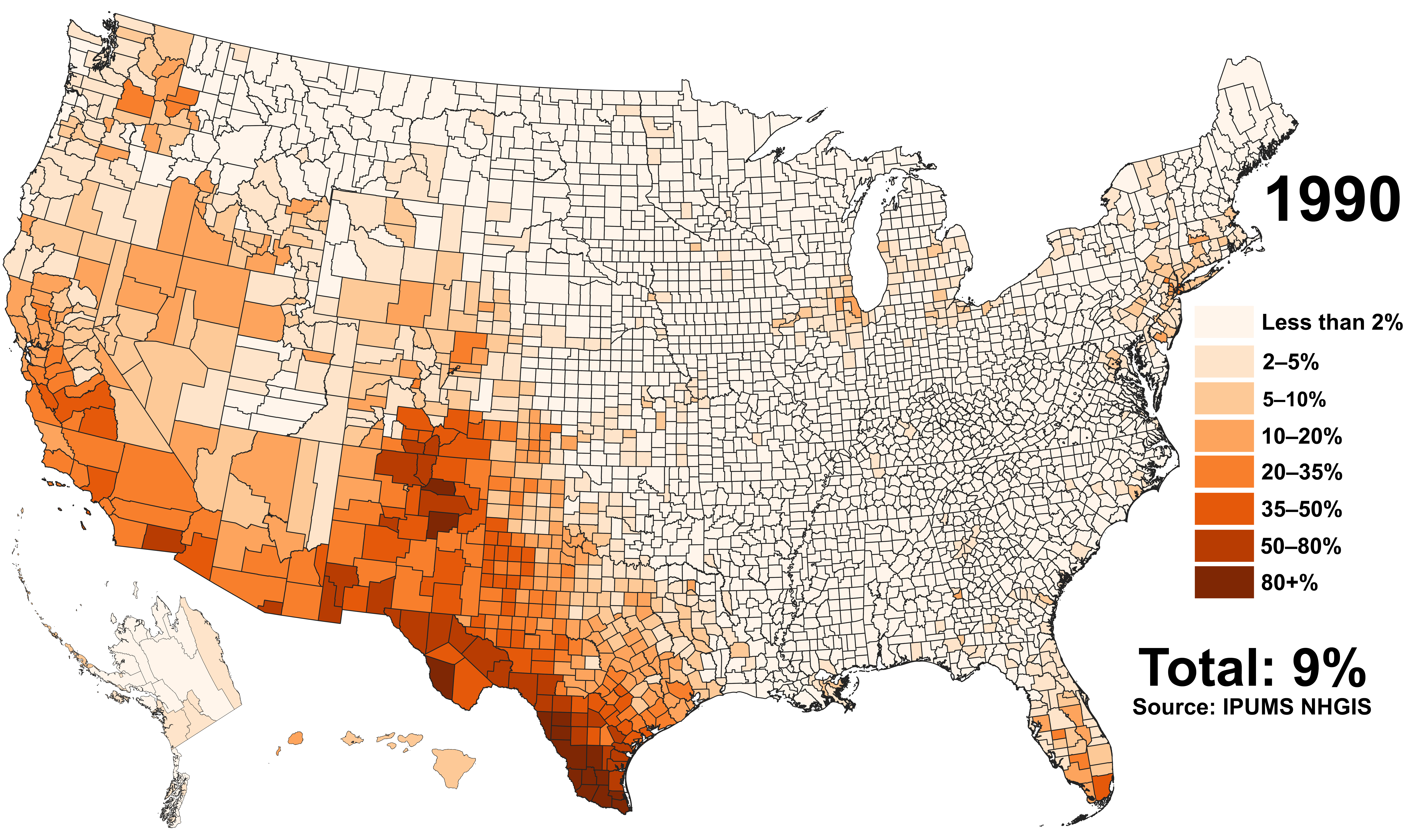
1990

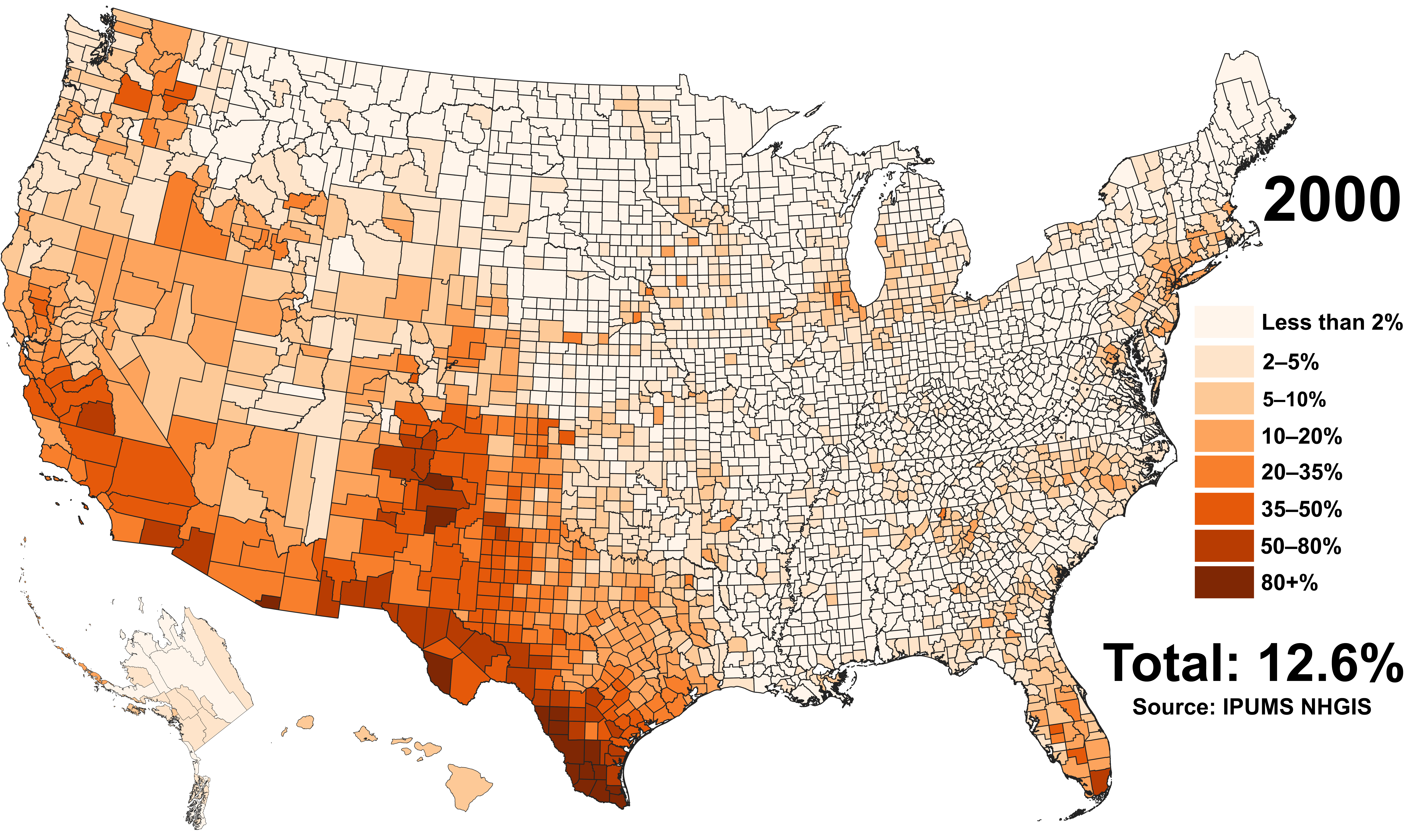
2000

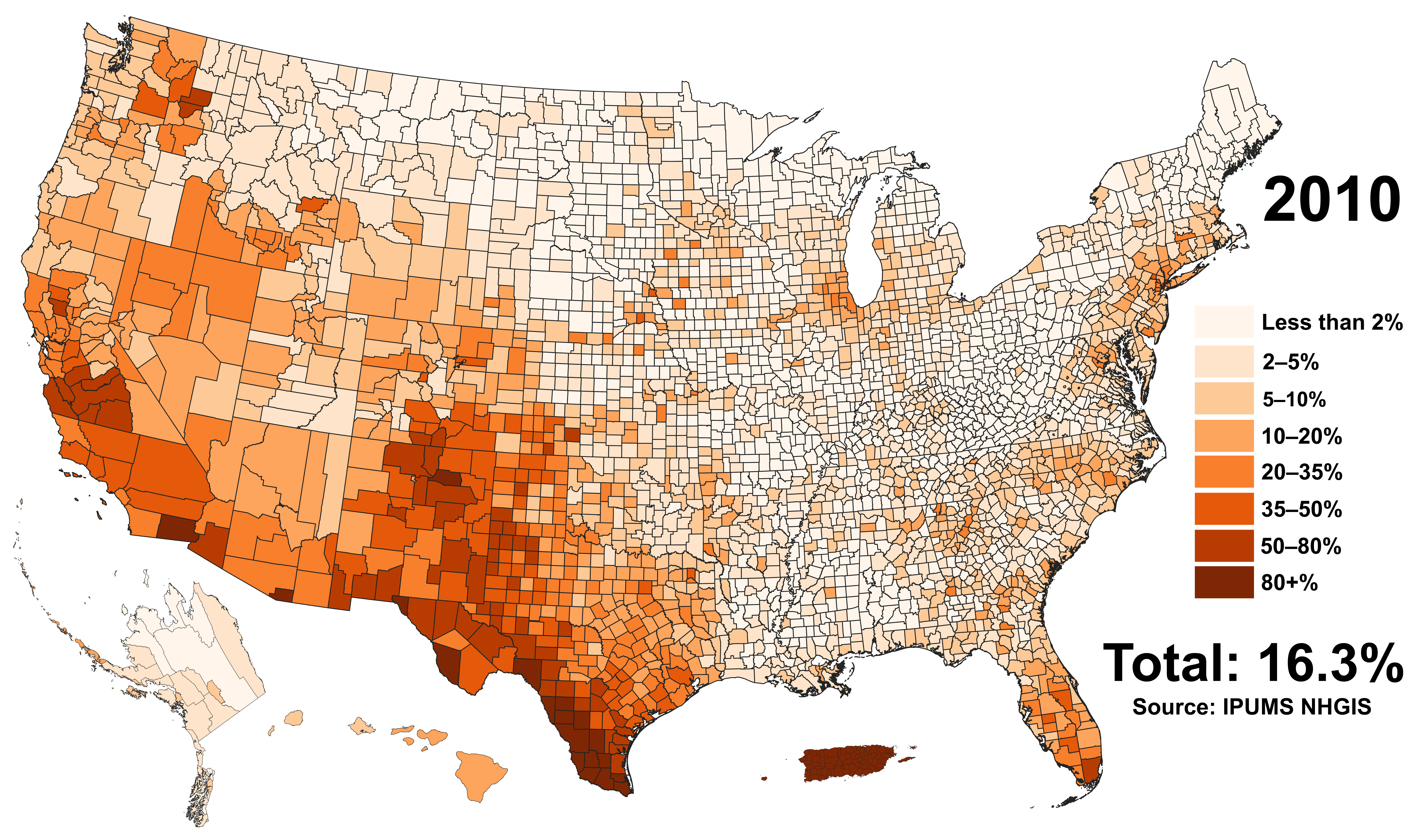
2010

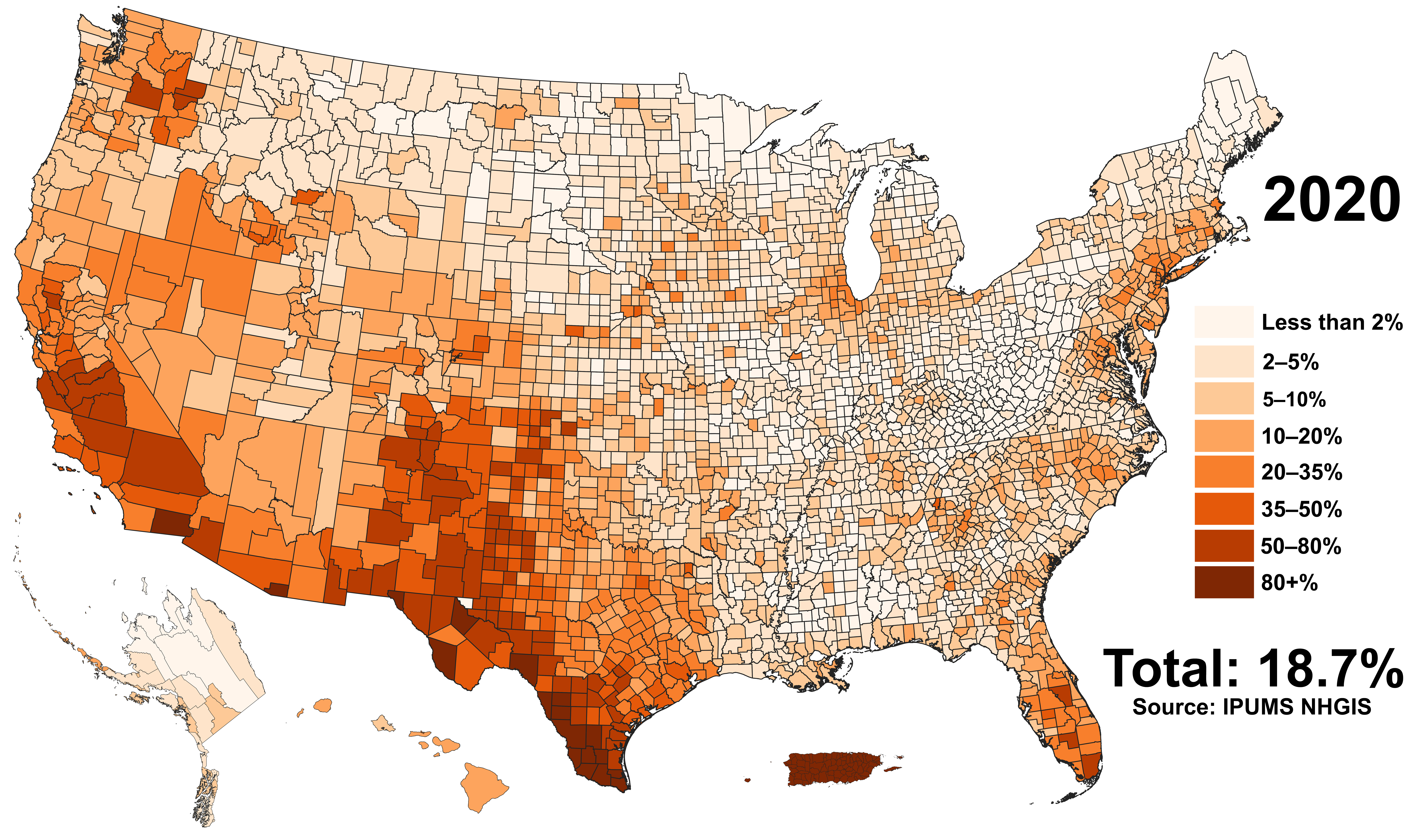
2020

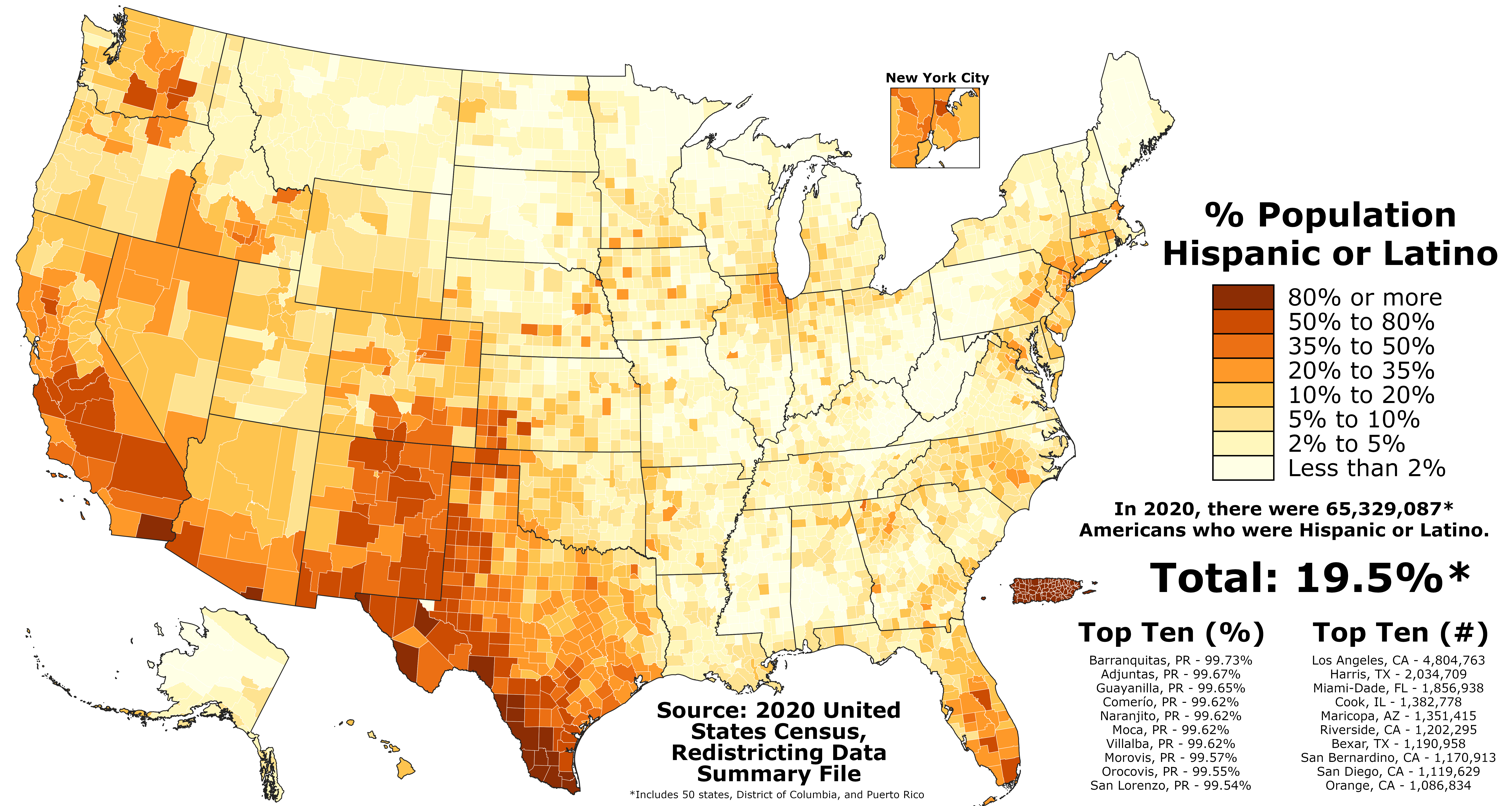
Proportion of Hispanic Americans in each county of the fifty states, the District of Columbia, and Puerto Rico as of the 2020 United States census

US Metropolitan Statistical Areas with over 1 million Hispanics (2014)

Rank	Metropolitan area	Hispanic population	Percent Hispanic
1	Los Angeles-Long Beach-Anaheim, CA	5,979,000	45.1%
2	New York-Newark-Jersey City, NY-NJ-PA	4,780,000	23.9%
3	Miami-Fort Lauderdale-West Palm Beach, FL	2,554,000	43.3%
4	Houston-The Woodlands-Sugar Land, TX	2,335,000	36.4%
5	Chicago-Naperville-Elgin, IL-IN-WI	2,251,000	23.4%
6	Riverside-San Bernardino-Ontario, CA	2,197,000	49.4%
7	Dallas-Fort Worth-Arlington, TX	1,943,000	28.4%
8	Phoenix-Mesa-Scottsdale, AZ	1,347,000	30.1%
9	San Antonio-New Braunfels, TX	1,259,000	55.7%
10	San Diego-Carlsbad, CA	1,084,000	33.3%
11	San Francisco-Oakland-Hayward, CA	1,008,000	21.9%

States and territories with the highest proportion of Hispanics (2021)

Rank	State/territory	Hispanic population	Percent Hispanic
1	Puerto Rico	3,249,043	99%
2	New Mexico	1,059,236	50%
3	Texas	11,857,387	40%
4	California	15,754,608	40%
5	Arizona	2,351,124	32%
6	Nevada	940,759	29%
7	Florida	5,830,915	26%
8	Colorado	1,293,214	22%
9	New Jersey	1,991,635	21%
10	New York	3,864,337	19%
11	Illinois	2,277,330	18%
12	United States Virgin Islands	18,514	17.4%

Of the nation's total Hispanic population, 49% (21.5 million) live in California or Texas. In 2022, New York City and Washington, D.C. began receiving significant numbers of Latino migrants from the state of Texas, mostly originating from Venezuela, Ecuador, Colombia, and Honduras.

Over half of the Hispanic population is concentrated in the Southwest region, mostly composed of Mexican Americans. California and Texas have some of the largest populations of Mexicans and Central American Hispanics in the United States. The Northeast region is dominated by Dominican Americans and Puerto Ricans, having the highest concentrations of both in the country. In the Mid Atlantic region, centered on the DC Metro Area, Salvadoran Americans are the largest of Hispanic groups. Florida is dominated by Cuban Americans and Puerto Ricans. In both the Great Lakes states and the South Atlantic states, Mexicans and Puerto Ricans dominate. Mexicans dominate in the rest of the country, including the West, South Central and Great Plains states.

=== National origin ===
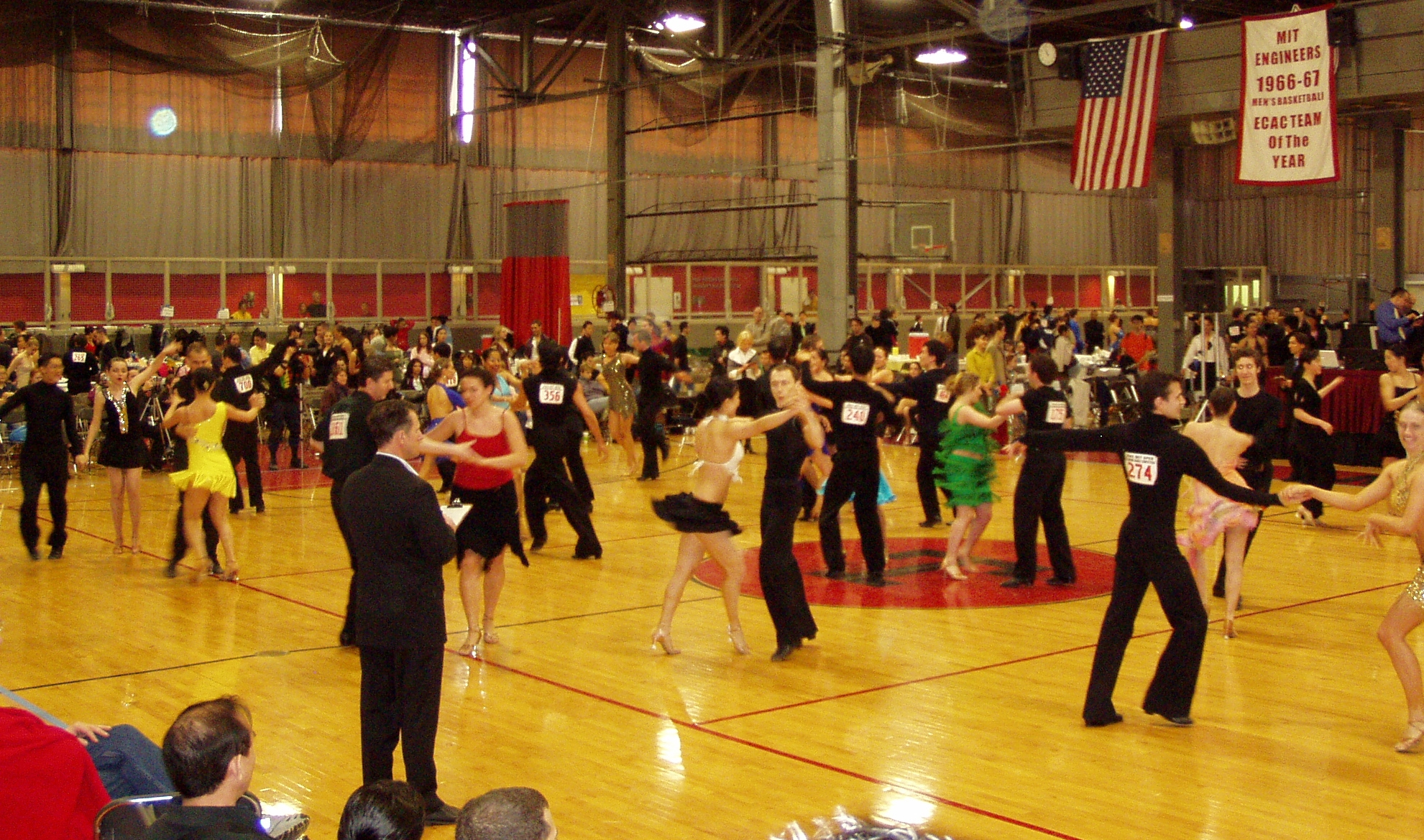
Intermediate level international-style Latin dancing at the 2006 MIT ballroom dance competition. A judge stands in the foreground.

Population by national origin (2024) (self-identified ethnicity, full or partial, not by birthplace)
Hispanic ancestry	Population	% of Latinos	% of USA
Mexican	38,990,058	57.32%	11.56%
Puerto Rican	6,110,356	8.98%	1.79%
Cuban	2,948,426	4.33%	0.86%
Salvadoran	2,767,861	4.06%	0.81%
Dominican	2,539,893	3.73%	0.74%
Guatemalan	2,174,242	3.19%	0.63%
Colombian	1,765,862	2.59%	0.51%
Honduran	1,459,863	2.14%	0.42%
Venezuelan	1,168,271	1.71%	0.34%
Ecuadorian	1,044,023	1.53%	0.30%
Peruvian	833,694	1.22%	0.25%
Nicaraguan	606,767	0.89%	0.17%
Argentinian	345,919	0.50%	0.10%
Panamanian	260,645	0.38%	0.07%
Chilean	226,993	0.33%	0.06%
Costa Rican	219,912	0.32%	0.06%
Bolivian	153,117	0.22%	0.04%
Uruguayan	81,864	0.12%	0.02%
Paraguayan	37,069	0.05%	0.01%
Other South American	35,067	0.05%	0.01%
Other Central American	28,849	0.04%	0.01%
Spanish (Note: Includes people who identify as Spaniard, Spanish, or Spanish American)	2,008,282	2.95%	0.59%
All other	2,205,980	3.24%	0.64%
Total	68,013,553	100.00%	19.99%

As of 2024, the largest group within the US Hispanic population is of Mexican origin, with nearly 39 million people (57.3%). People of Puerto Rican origin are the second largest group with over 6 million (8.9%). The Hispanic origin groups that follow are Cubans (4.3%), Salvadorans (4.0%), Dominicans (3.7%) and Guatemalans (3.1%) with more than 2 million people each, and Colombians (2.5%), Hondurans (2.1%), Venezuelans (1.7%) and Ecuadorians (1.5%) with more than 1 million people each. All other groups of Central American or South American origin in the U.S. make up less than 1 million people each. Additionally, 2 million (2.9%) people are of origin from Spain (including those listed as Spanish), while more than 2 million (3.24%) are of unspecified Hispanic origin. In 2017, two thirds of all Hispanic Americans were born in the United States.

There are few immigrants from Spain, since Spaniards have historically emigrated to Hispanic America rather than to English-speaking countries. Because of this, most Hispanics who identify themselves as Spaniard or Spanish also identify with Hispanic American national origin. In the 2017 Census estimate approximately 1.76 million Americans reported some form of "Spanish" as their ancestry, whether from Spain or not.

In northern New Mexico and southern Colorado, there is a large portion of Hispanics who trace their ancestry to settlers from New Spain (Mexico), and sometimes Spain itself, in the late 16th century through the 17th century. People from this background often self-identify as "Hispanos", "Spanish" or "Hispanic". Many of these settlers also intermarried with local Native Americans, creating a mestizo population. Likewise, southern Louisiana is home to communities of people of Canary Islands descent, known as Isleños, in addition to other people of Spanish ancestry. Californios, Nuevomexicanos and Tejanos are Americans of Spanish and/or Mexican descent, with subgroups that sometimes call themselves Chicanos. Nuevomexicanos and Tejanos are distinct southwest Hispanic cultures with their own cuisines, dialects and musical traditions.

Nuyoricans are Americans of Puerto Rican descent from the New York City area. There are close to two million Nuyoricans in the United States. Prominent Nuyoricans include Congresswoman Alexandria Ocasio-Cortez, US Supreme Court Judge Sonia Sotomayor, singer Jennifer Lopez and actor Lin-Manuel Miranda.

=== Race and ethnicity ===
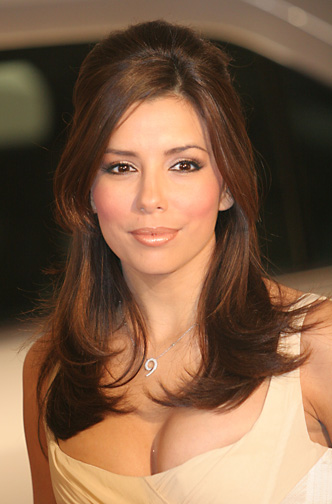
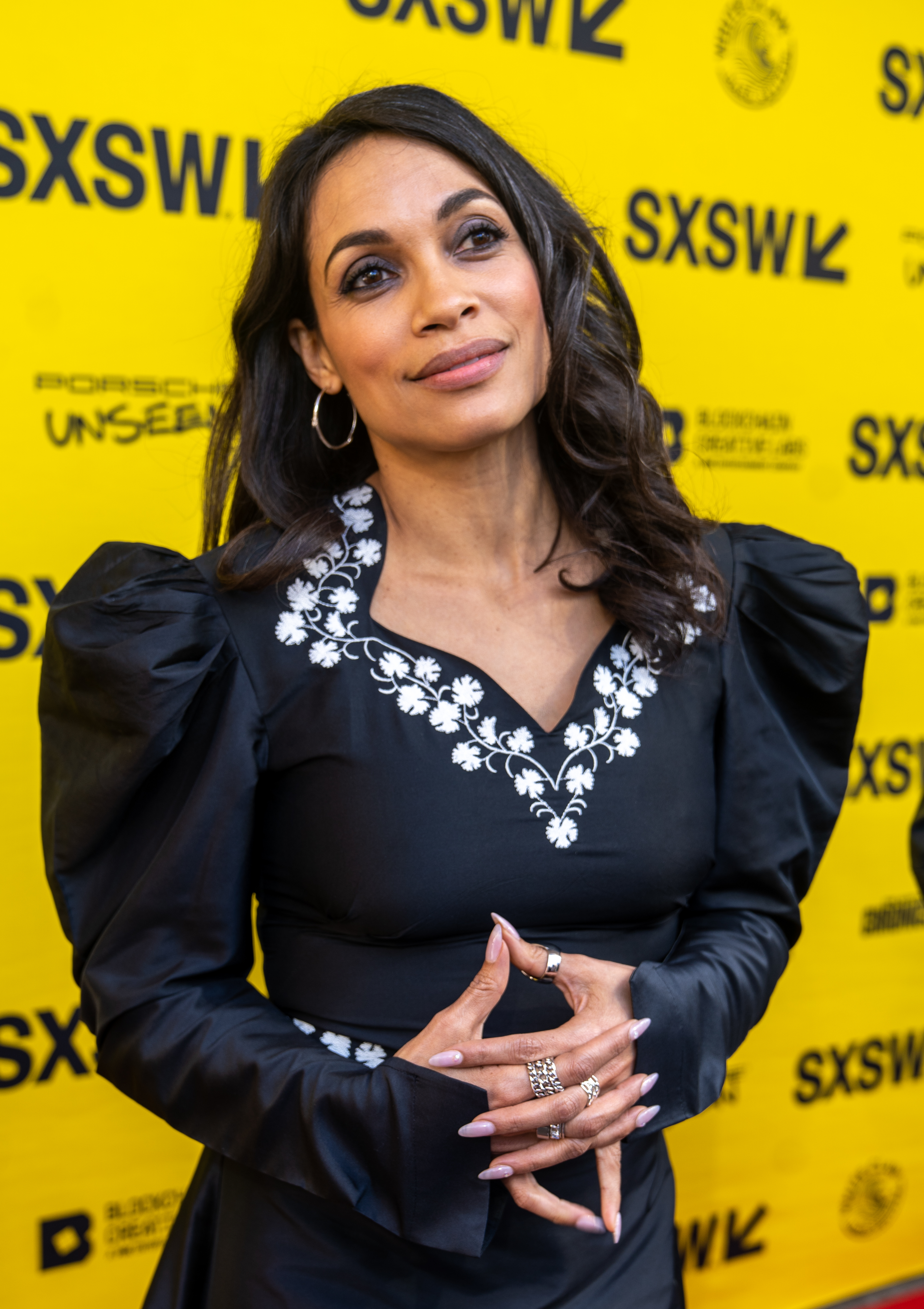
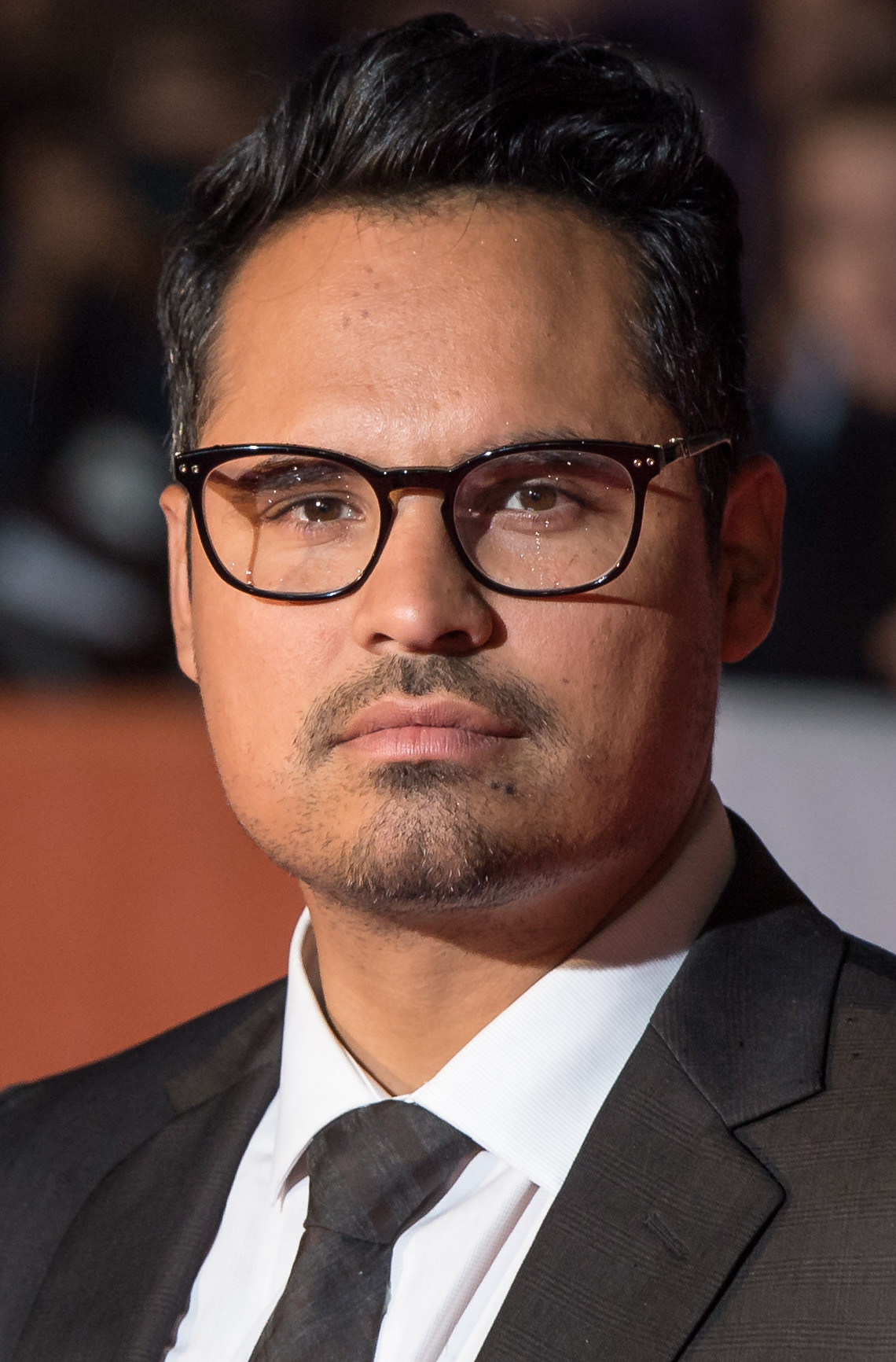
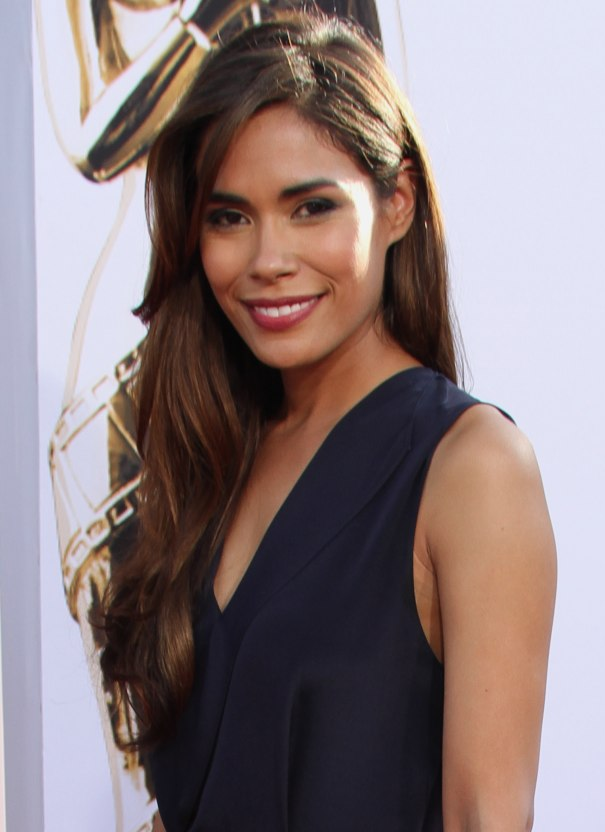
Clockwise from top left:
Eva Longoria, Rosario Dawson, Daniella Alonso, Michael Peña

Hispanics come from multi-racial and multi-ethnic countries with diversity of origins; therefore, a Hispanic can be from any race or mix of races. The most common ancestries are: Native American, European and African. Many also have colonial era New Christian Sephardic Jewish ancestry. As a result of their racial diversity, Hispanics form an ethnicity sharing a language (Spanish) and cultural heritage, rather than a race.

Hispanic origin is independent of race and is termed "ethnicity" by the United States Census Bureau.

On the 2020 United States census, 20.3% of Hispanics selected "White" as their race. This marked a large drop when compared to the 2010 United States census in which 53.0% of Hispanics identified as "White". These Hispanics make up 12,579,626 people or 3.8% of the population.

Over 42% of Hispanic Americans identify as "some other race". Of all Americans who checked the box "Some Other Race", 97 percent were Hispanic. These Hispanics make up 26,225,882 people or 42.2% of the Hispanic population.

Over half of the "two or more races" respondents were Hispanics. These Hispanics make up 20,299,960 people or 32.7% of the Hispanic population.

The largest numbers of Black Hispanics are from the Spanish Caribbean islands and Central America, including the Cuban, Haitian, Honduran, Panamanian, Dominican, and Puerto Rican communities.

In Puerto Rico, people have some Indigenous ancestry as well as European and Canary Islander ancestry. There's also a population of predominantly African descent as well as populations of Indigenous descent as well as those with intermixed ancestries. Cubans are mostly of Iberian and Canary Islander ancestry, with some heritage from Indigenous Caribbeans. There are also populations of Black African ancestry and multi-racial people. The race and culture of each Hispanic country and their United States diaspora differs by history and geography.

Welch and Sigelman found, as of the year 2000, lower interaction between Latinos of different nationalities (such as between Cubans and Mexicans) than between Latinos and non-Latinos. This is a reminder that while they are often treated as such, Latinos in the United States are not a monolith, and often view their own ethnic or national identity as vastly different from that of other Latinos.

Racial Demographics of Hispanic Americans Between 1970 and 2020
Race/Ethnic Group	1970	1980	1990	2000	2010	2020
Total Population	9,072,602	14,608,673	22,354,059	35,305,818	50,477,594	62,080,044
White alone	8,466,126 (93.3%)	8,115,256 (55.6%)	11,557,774 (51.7%)	16,907,852 (47.9%)	26,735,713 (53.0%)	12,579,626 (20.3%)
Black alone	454,934 (5.0%)	390,852 (2.7%)	769,767 (3.4%)	710,353 (2.0%)	1,243,471 (2.5%)	1,163,862 (1.9%)
Native American or Alaska Native alone	26,859 (0.3%)	94,745 (0.6%)	165,461 (0.7%)	407,073 (1.2%)	685,150 (1.4%)	1,475,436 (2.4%)
Asian or Pacific Islander alone	x	166,010 (1.1%)	305,303 (1.4%)	165,155 (0.5%)	267,565 (0.5%)	335,278 (0.5%)
Some other race alone	124,683 (1.4%) (Note: Includes Asian Americans.)	5,841,810 (40.0%)	9,555,754 (42.7%)	14,891,303 (42.2%)	18,503,103 (36.7%)	26,225,882 (42.2%)
Two or more races	x (Note: The 1970, 1980, and 1990 US censuses did not allow for the selection of multiple races.)	x	x	2,224,082 (6.3%)	3,042,592 (6.0%)	20,299,960 (32.7%)

=== Genetics ===
According to a 2015 study based on customers who took a 23andMe DNA test, self-identified Hispanic Americans were found to be 65% European, around 18% Native American, and 6% African. Another automosal DNA study published in 2019, focusing specifically on Native American ancestry in different ethnic/racial groups, found that self-identified Hispanic Americans had an average of 38% Native American ancestry, with the rest being largely European, and less than 10% African ancestry. These results varied between individuals and regions. Hispanic participants from the West Coast and West South Central regions, where the Hispanic population is predominantly Mexican-American, had an average of 43% Native American ancestry. On the other hand, those from the Mid-Atlantic region, where the Hispanic population is predominantly of Puerto Rican or Dominican descent, averaged only 11% Native American ancestry.

=== Age ===
As of 2014, one third, or 17.9 million, of the Hispanic population was younger than 18 and a quarter, 14.6 million, were Millennials. This makes them more than half of the Hispanic population within the United States.

According to March of Dimes, in the period of 2022-2024, 26.3% of births were to Hispanic mothers, the second largest demographic group, behind non-Hispanic white births (49.7%) and ahead of non-Hispanic Black births (13.6%).

== Education ==
=== Hispanic K–12 education ===
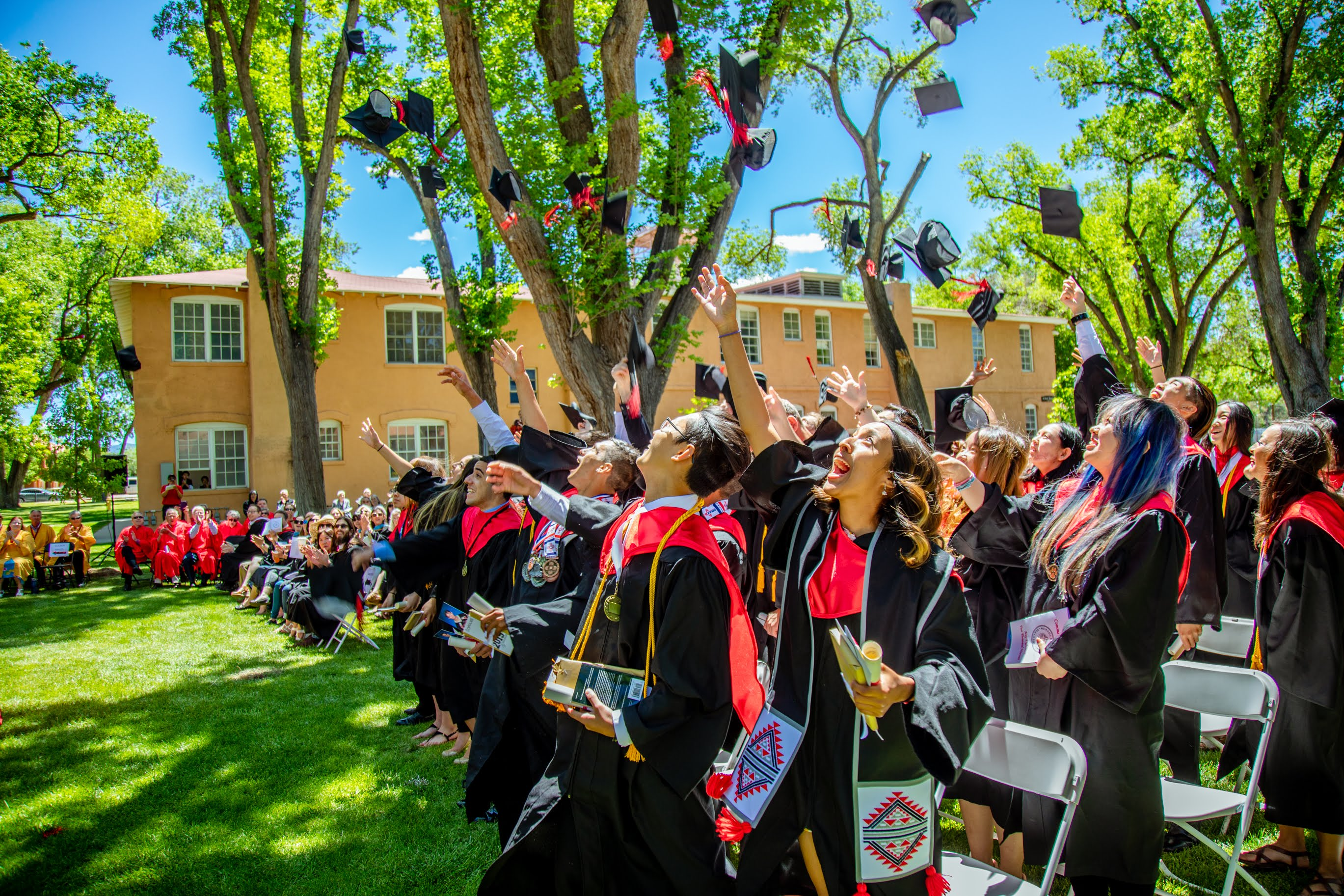
The Menaul School is a boarding school in Albuquerque, New Mexico, established in 1896 to educate Hispanic-Americans.

With the increasing Hispanic population in the United States, Hispanics have had a considerable impact on the K–12 system. In 2011–12, Hispanics constituted 24% of all enrollments in the United States, including 52% and 51% of enrollment in California and Texas, respectively. Further research shows the Hispanic population will continue to grow in the United States, implicating that more Hispanics will populate US schools.

The state of Hispanic education shows some promise. First, Hispanic students attending pre-K or kindergarten were more likely to attend full-day programs. Second, Hispanics in elementary education were the second largest group represented in gifted and talented programs. Third, Hispanics' average NAEP math and reading scores have consistently increased over the last 10 years. Finally, Hispanics were more likely than other groups, including White people, to go to college.

However, their academic achievement in early childhood, elementary, and secondary education lag behind other groups. For instance, their average math and reading NAEP scores were lower than every other group, except African Americans, and have the highest dropout rate of any group, 13% despite decreasing from 24%.

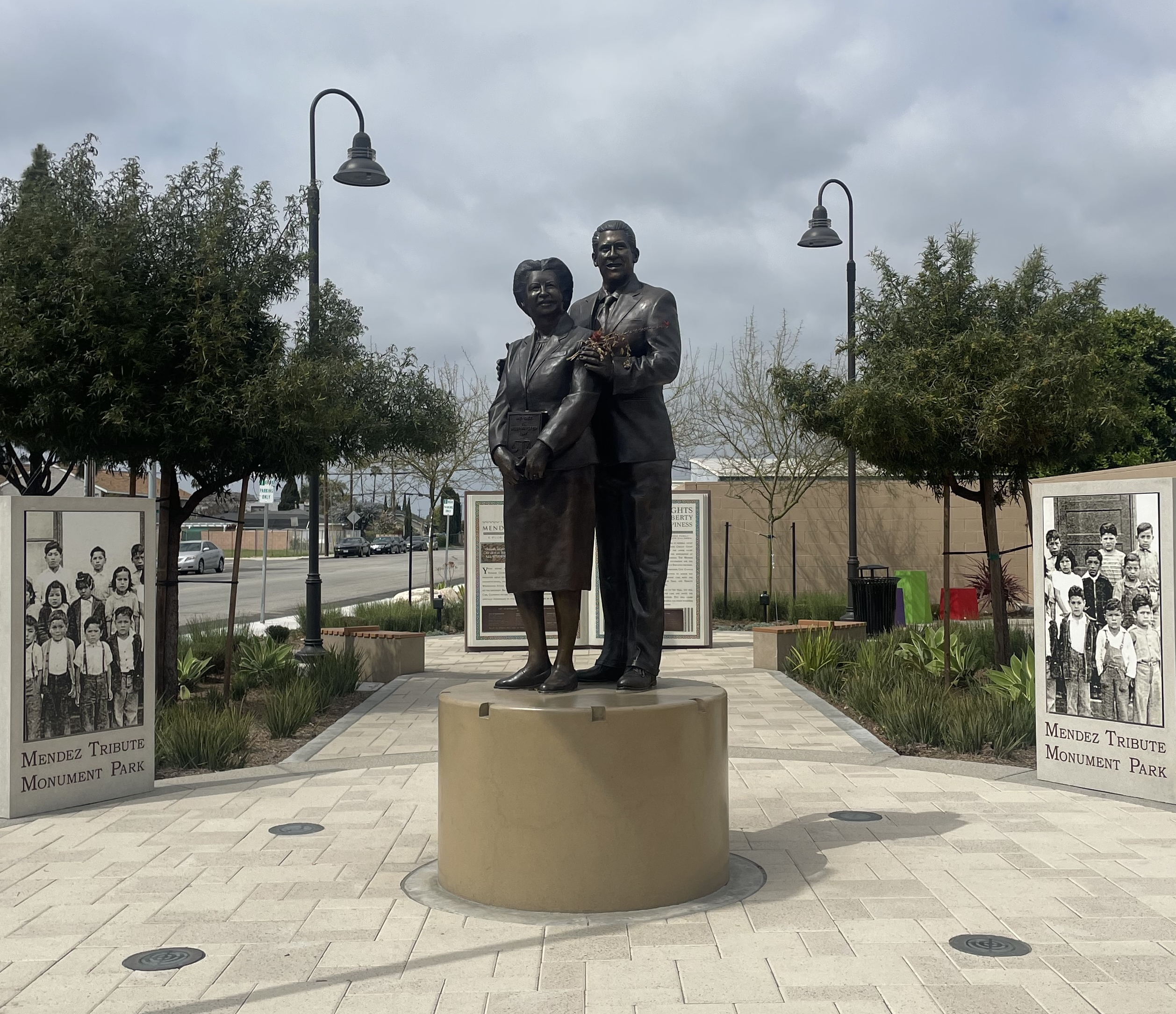
Felicitas and Gonzalo Méndez led an educational civil rights battle culminating in the 1947 landmark case, Mendez v. Westminster, which ended the segregation of Mexican students.

To explain these disparities, some scholars have suggested there is a Hispanic "Education Crisis" due to failed school and social policies. To this end, scholars have further offered several potential reasons including language barriers, poverty, and immigrant/nativity status resulting in Hispanics not performing well academically.

==== English-language learners ====
Currently, Hispanic students make up 80% of English-language learners in the United States. In 2008–2009, 5.3 million students were classified as English Language Learners (ELLs) in pre-K to 12th grade. This is a result of many students entering the education system at different ages, although the majority of ELLs are not foreign born. In order to provide English instruction for Hispanic students there have been a multitude of English Language programs. Schools make demands when it comes to English fluency. There are test requirements to certify students who are non-native English speakers in writing, speaking, reading, and listening, for example. They take an ELPAC test, which evaluates their English efficiency. This assessment determines whether they are considered ELL students or not. For Hispanic students, being an ELL student will have a big impact because it's additional pressure to pass an extra exam apart from their own original classes. Furthermore, if the exam is not passed before they attend high school, the student will fall behind in their courses due to the additional ELD courses instead of taking their normal classes in that year. However, the great majority of these programs are English Immersion, which arguably undermines the students' culture and knowledge of their primary language. As such, there continues to be great debate within schools as to which program can address these language disparities.

==== Immigration status ====
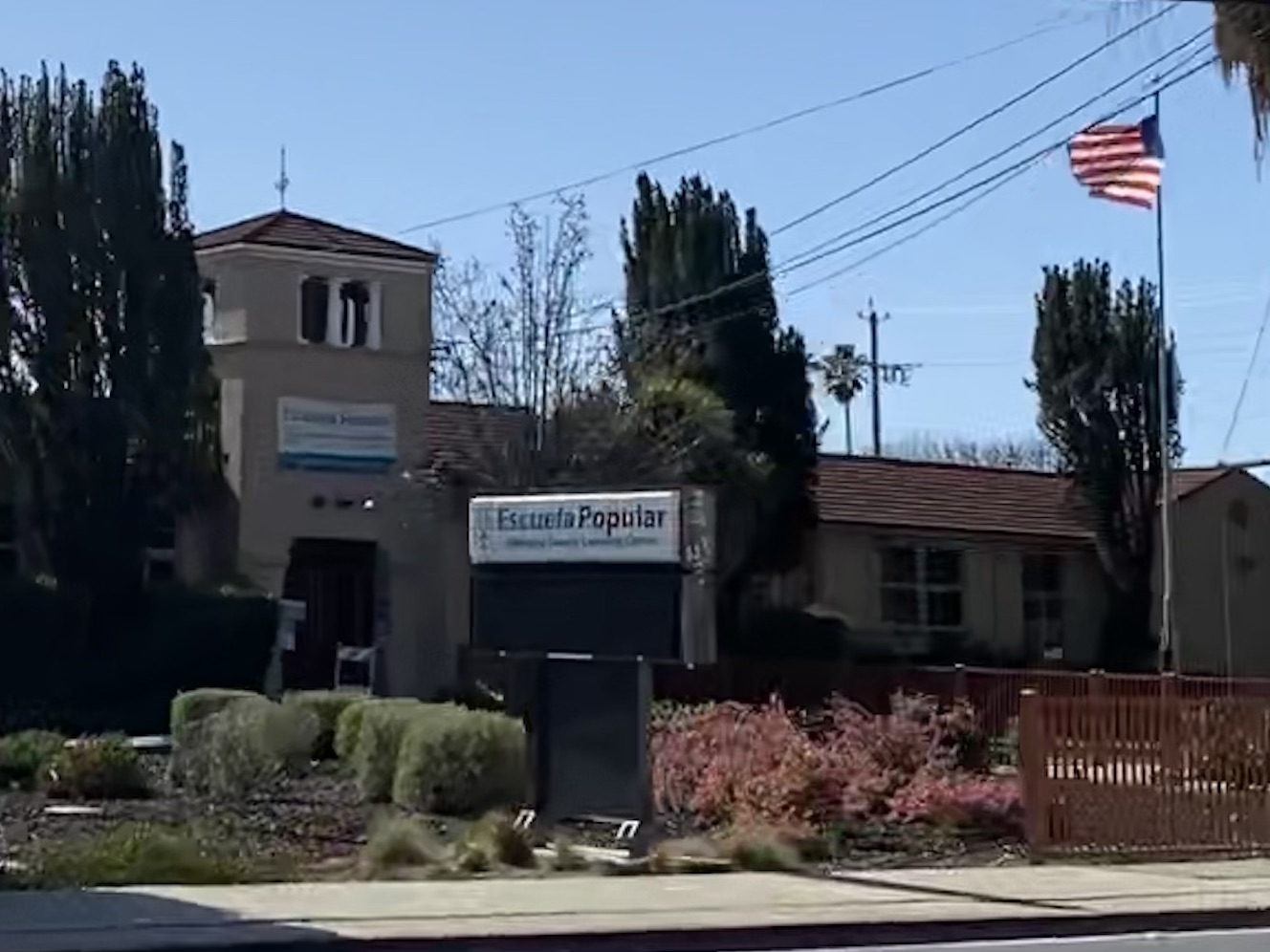
Escuela Popular, a Spanish-English dual immersion school in San Jose, California.

There are more than five million ELLs from all over the world attending public schools in the United States and speaking at least 460 different languages. Undocumented immigrants have not always had access to compulsory education in the United States. However, since the landmark Supreme Court case Plyler v. Doe in 1982, immigrants have received access to K-12 education. This significantly impacted all immigrant groups, including Hispanics. However, their academic achievement is dependent upon several factors including, but not limited to time of arrival and schooling in country of origin. When non-native speakers arrive to the United States, the student not only enters a new country, language or culture, but they also enter a testing culture to determine everything from their placements to advancement into the next grade level in their education. Moreover, Hispanics' immigration/nativity status plays a major role regarding their academic achievement. For instance, first- and second- generation Hispanics outperform their later generational counterparts. Additionally, their aspirations appear to decrease as well. This has major implications on their post-secondary futures.

=== Simultaneous bilingualism ===
The term "simultaneous bilinguals", which was coined by researcher Guadalupe Valdez, refers to individuals who acquire two languages as a "first" language. Most American circumstantial bilinguals acquire their ethnic or immigrant language first and then English. The period of acquisition of the second language is known as incipient bilingualism.

=== Hispanic higher education ===
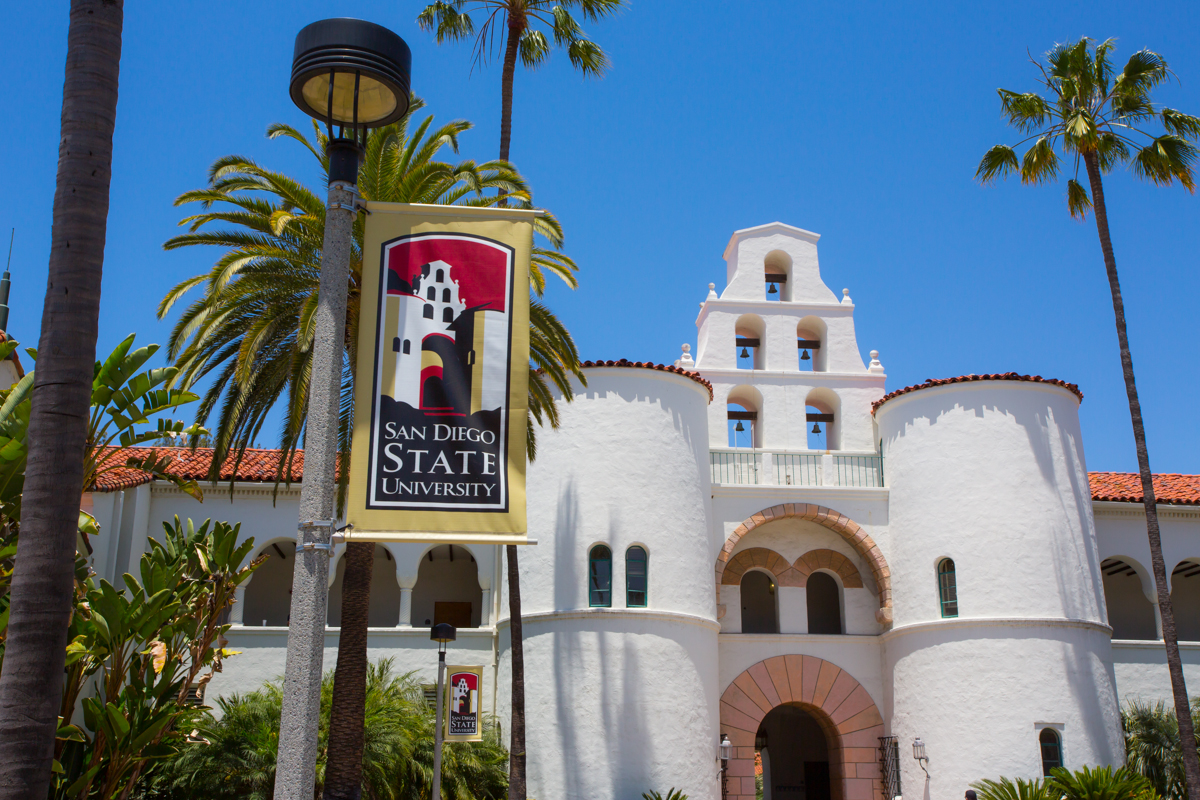
The California State University system has the highest number of Hispanic students of any university system in the country.

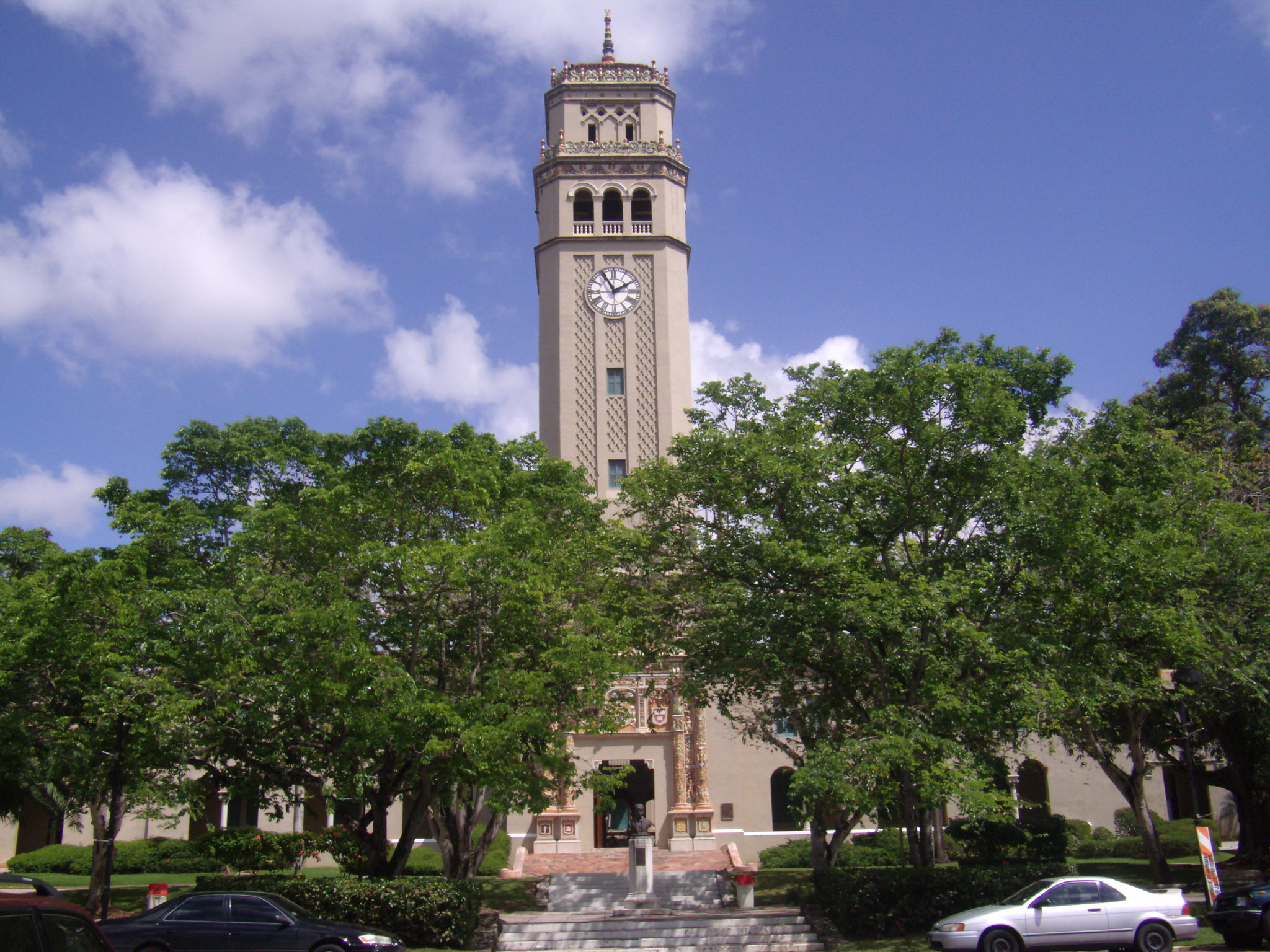
The University of Puerto Rico is the largest Spanish-language educational institution in the United States.

Those with a bachelor's degree or higher ranges from 50% of Venezuelans compared to 18% for Ecuadorians 25 years and older. Amongst the largest Hispanic groups, those with a bachelor's or higher was 25% for Cubans, 16% of Puerto Ricans, 15% of Dominicans, and 11% for Mexicans. Over 21% of all second-generation Dominican Americans have college degrees, slightly below the national average (28%) but significantly higher than US-born Mexican Americans (13%) and US-born Puerto Rican Americans (12%).

Hispanics make up the second or third largest ethnic group in Ivy League universities, considered to be the most prestigious in the United States. Hispanic enrollment at Ivy League universities has gradually increased over the years. Today, Hispanics make up between 8% of students at Yale University to 15% at Columbia University. For example, 18% of students in the Harvard University Class of 2018 are Hispanic.

Hispanics have significant enrollment in many other top universities such as University of Texas at El Paso (70% of students), Florida International University (63%), University of Miami (27%), and MIT, UCLA and UC-Berkeley at 15% each. At Stanford University, Hispanics are the third largest ethnic group behind non-Hispanic White people and Asians, at 18% of the student population.

==== Hispanic university enrollments ====
While Hispanics study in colleges and universities throughout the country, some choose to attend federally-designated Hispanic-serving institutions, institutions that are accredited, degree-granting, public or private nonprofit institutions of higher education with 25 percent or more total undergraduate Hispanic full-time equivalent (FTE) student enrollment. There are over 270 institutions of higher education that have been designated as an HSI.

Universities with the largest Hispanic undergraduate enrollment (2013)

Rank	University	Hispanic enrollment	% of student body
1	Florida International University	24,105	67%
2	University of Texas at El Paso	15,459	81%
3	University of Texas Pan American	15,009	91%
4	University of Texas at San Antonio	11,932	47%
5	California State University at Northridge	11,774	38%
6	California State University at Fullerton	11,472	36%
7	Arizona State University	11,465	19%
8	California State University at Long Beach	10,836	35%
9	California State University at Los Angeles	10,392	58%
10	University of Central Florida	10,255	20%

Universities with the largest Hispanic graduate enrollment (2013)

Rank	University	Hispanic enrollment	% of student body
1	Nova Southeastern University	4,281	20%
2	Florida International University	3,612	42%
3	University of Southern California	2,358	11%
4	University of Texas Pan American	2,120	78%
5	University of Texas at El Paso	2,083	59%
6	CUNY Graduate Center	1,656	30%
7	University of New Mexico	1,608	26%
8	University of Texas at San Antonio	1,561	35%
9	University of Florida	1,483	9%
10	Arizona State University	1,400	10%

Hispanic student enrollment in university and college systems (2012–2013)

Rank	University system	Hispanic enrollment	% of student body
1	California Community College System	642,045	41%
2	California State University	149,137	33%
3	Florida College System	118,821	26%
4	University of Texas System	84,086	39%
5	State University System of Florida	79,931	24%
6	City University of New York	77,341	30%
7	State University of New York	43,514	9%
8	University of California	42,604	18%
9	Texas A&M University System	27,165	25%
10	Nevada System of Higher Education	21,467	21%
–	Ivy League	11,562	10%

== Health ==
=== Longevity ===
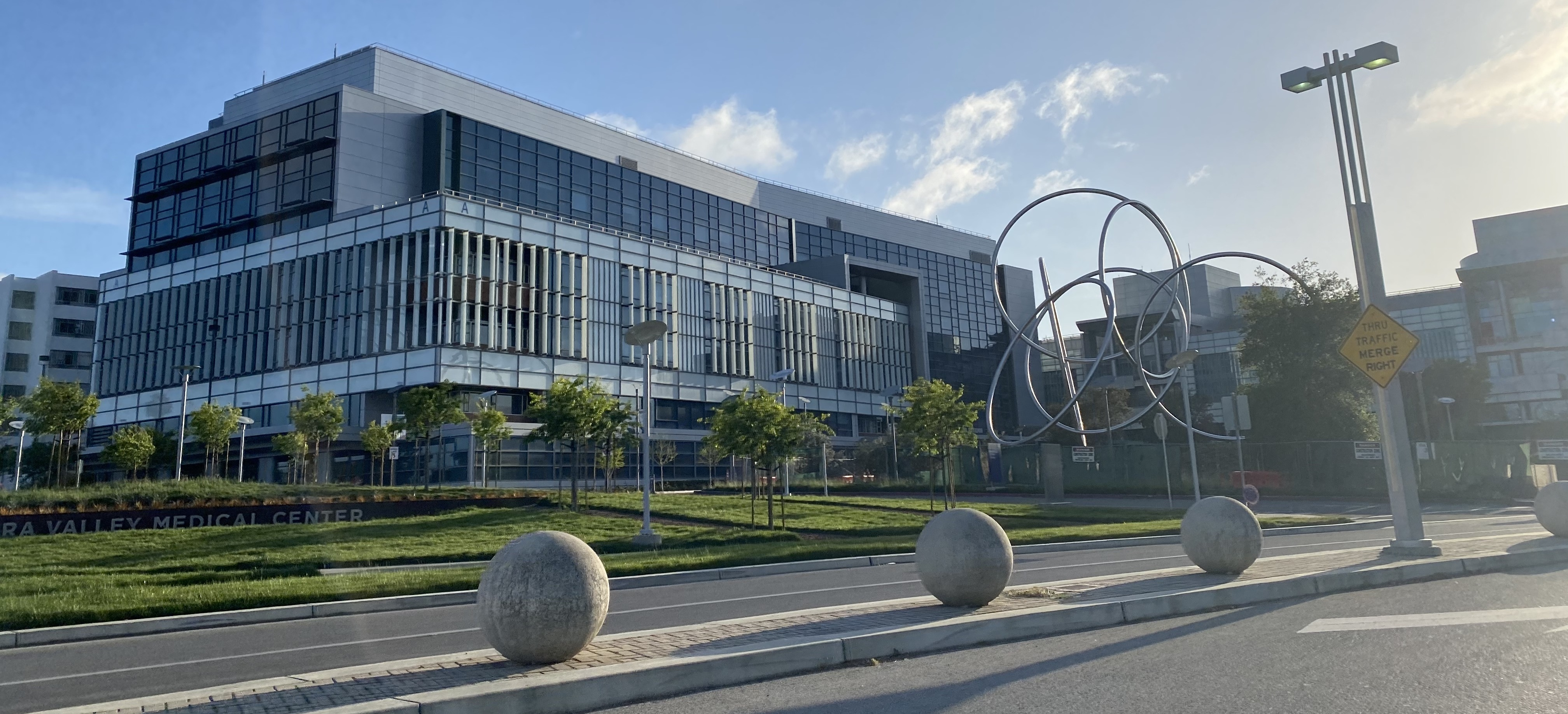
Santa Clara Valley Medical Center in San Jose, California.

As of 2016, life expectancy for Hispanic Americans is 81.8 years, which is higher than the life expectancy for White Americans (78.6 years). Research on the "Hispanic paradox"—the well-established apparent mortality advantage of Hispanic Americans compared to White Americans, despite the latter's more advantaged socioeconomic status—has been principally explained by "(1) health-related migration to and from the US; and (2) social and cultural protection mechanisms, such as maintenance of healthy lifestyles and behaviors adopted in the countries of origin, and availability of extensive social networks in the US." The "salmon bias" hypothesis, which suggests that the Hispanic health advantage is attributable to higher rates of return migration among less-healthy migrants, has received some support in the scholarly literature. A 2019 study, examining the comparatively better health of foreign-born American Hispanics, challenged the hypothesis that a stronger orientation toward the family (familism) contributed to this advantage. Some scholars have suggested that the Hispanic mortality advantage is likely to disappear due to the higher rates of obesity and diabetes among Hispanics relative to White people, although lower rates of smoking (and thus smoking-attributable mortality) among Hispanics may counteract this to some extent.

As the COVID-19 coronavirus spread throughout the United States, disproportionate numbers of cases have been observed among Black and Hispanic populations.

=== Healthcare ===
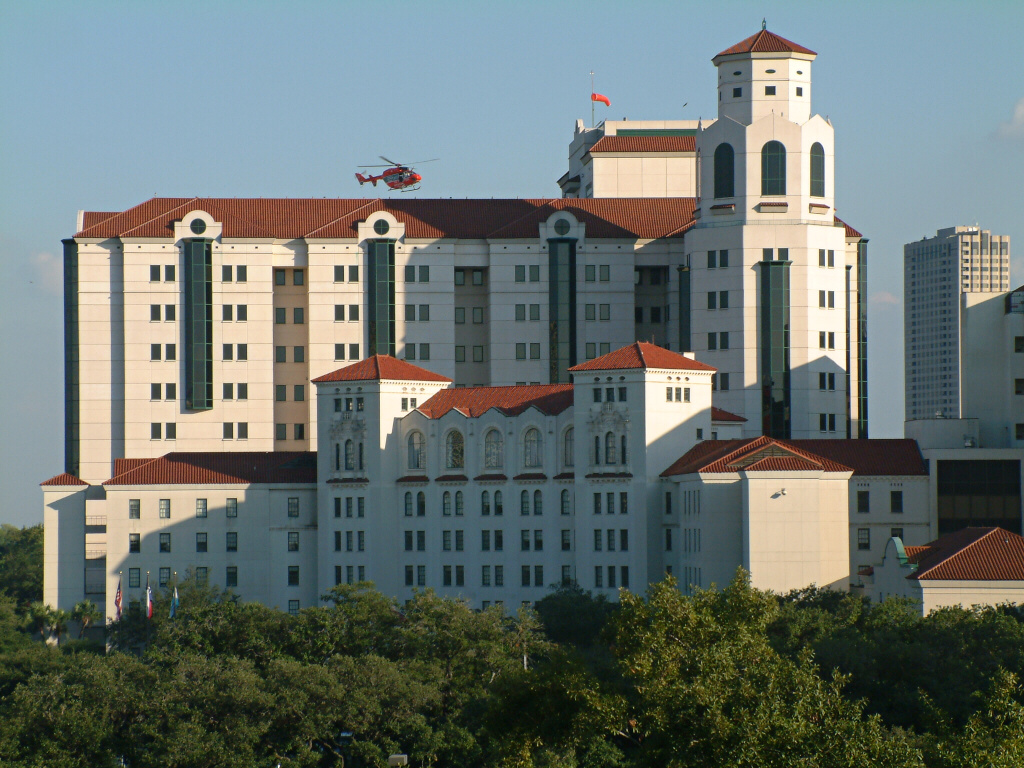
Memorial Hermann–Texas Medical Center in Houston, Texas.

As of 2017, about 19% of Hispanic Americans lack health insurance coverage, which is the highest of all ethnic groups except for Indigenous Americans and Alaska Natives. In terms of extending health coverage, Hispanics benefited the most among US ethnic groups from the Affordable Care Act (ACA); among non-elderly Hispanics, the uninsured rate declined from 26.7% in 2013 to 14.2% in 2017. Among the population of non-elderly uninsured Hispanic population in 2017, about 53% were non-citizens, about 39% were US-born citizens, and about 9% were naturalized citizens. (The ACA does not help undocumented immigrants or legal immigrants with less than five years' residence in the United States gain coverage).

According to a 2013 study, Mexican women have the highest uninsured rate (54.6%) as compared to other immigrants (26.2%), Black (22.5%) and White (13.9%). According to the study, Mexican women are the largest female immigrant group in the United States, and are also the most at risk for developing preventable health conditions. Multiple factors such as limited access to health care, legal status and income increase the risk of developing preventable health conditions because many undocumented immigrants postpone routine visits to the doctor until they become seriously ill.

=== Effects of family separation ===
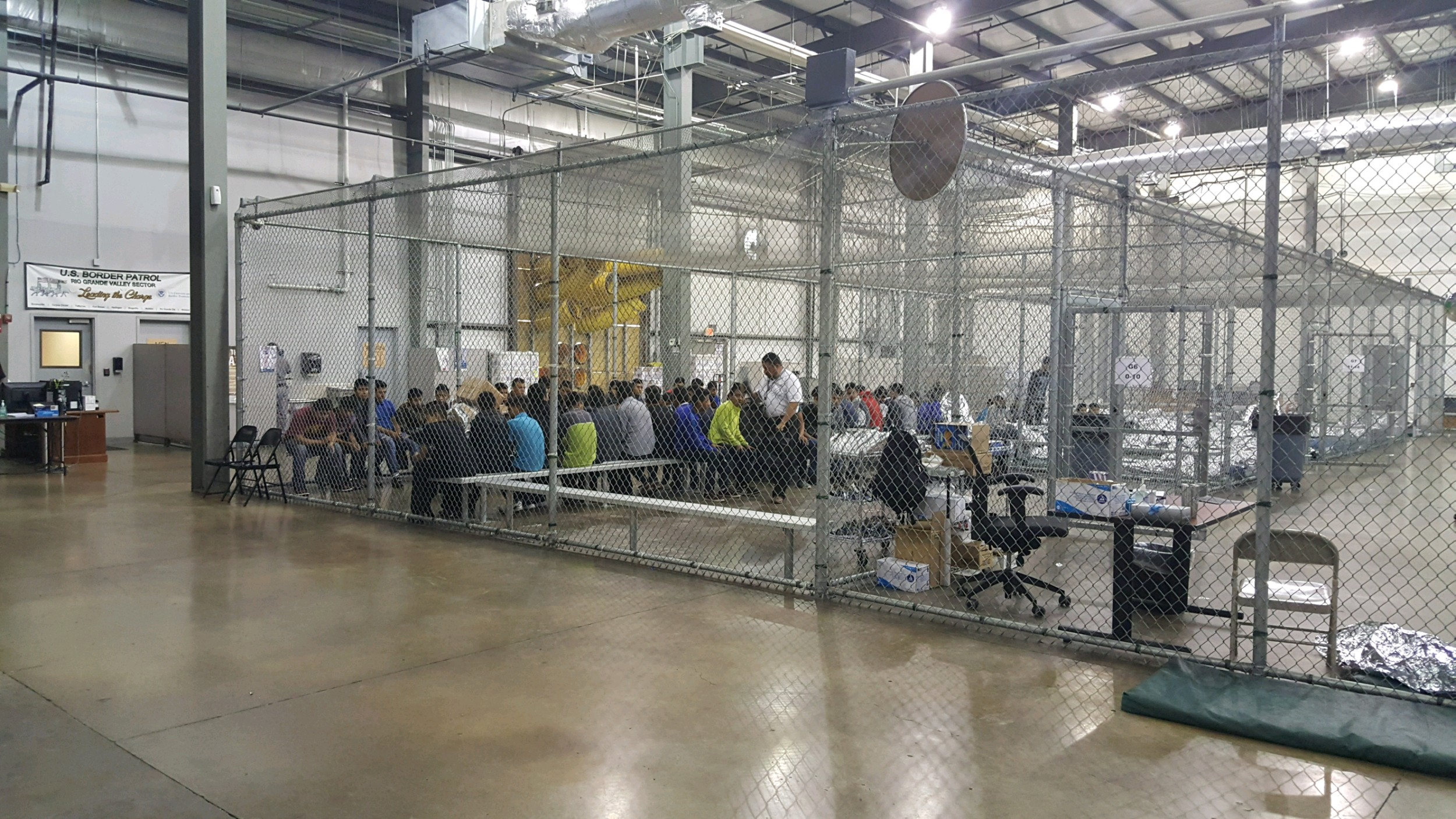
Ursula detention center in McAllen, Texas is the largest U.S. Customs and Border Protection facility for processing undocumented immigrants.

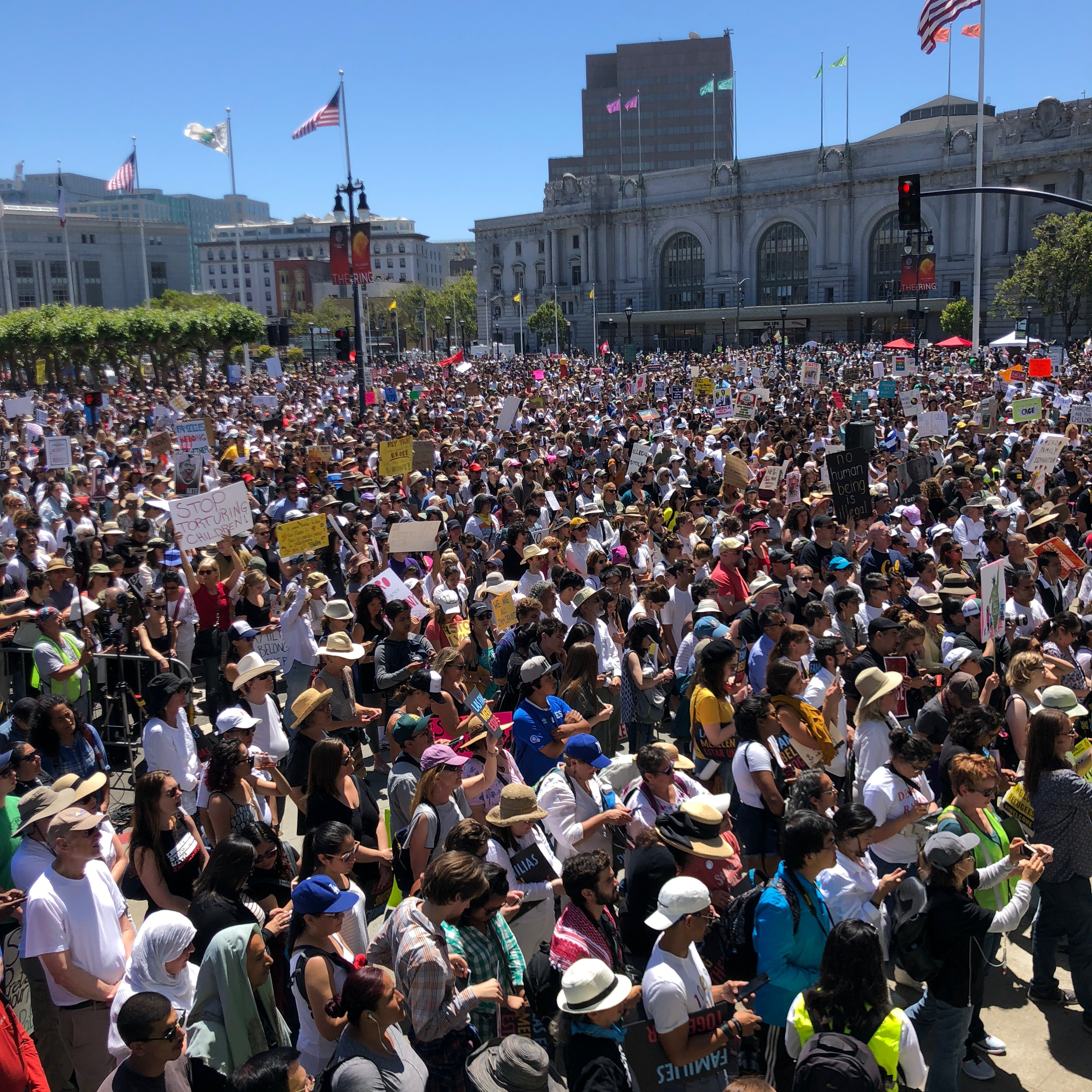
Rally to end the Trump administration family separation policy in San Francisco.

The American Academy of Pediatrics, the Canadian Paediatric Society, the American Medical Association, the Canadian Medical Association and the International Society for Social Pediatrics and Child Health strongly condemn the systematic splitting of immigrant families. During the summer 2018, over 2300 immigrant children, reportedly including preverbal and breastfed infants were relocated to separate shelters across the USA pending their parent's case. By 2025, at least 5,600 migrant children had been separated from their parents, hundreds of which have never been reunited, while families continue to be separated. In 2025, more than 100 US citizen infants and children were separated from their parents.

Immigration policies for arriving Mexican and Central American immigrants are linked to mental health issues among documented and undocumented immigrant families and youth. The effects are often long-term and the impact extends to the community level. Children may experience emotional traumas and long-term changes in behaviors. Additionally, when parents are forcefully removed, children often develop feelings of abandonment and they might blame themselves for what has happened to their family. Some children believe in the possibility of never seeing their parents again. These effects can cause negative parent-child attachment. Reunification may be difficult because of immigration laws and re-entry restrictions which further affect the mental health of children and parents. Parents who leave their home country also experience negative mental health experiences. According to a study published in 2013 on Mexican migrant men, 46% of those who participated in the study reported elevated levels of depressive symptoms, associated with structural stressors (family separation, sending remittances to Mexico) and situational stressors (fearfulness, worry about police confrontation, treatment by non-Latinos, and lack of support).

=== Vulnerabilities ===
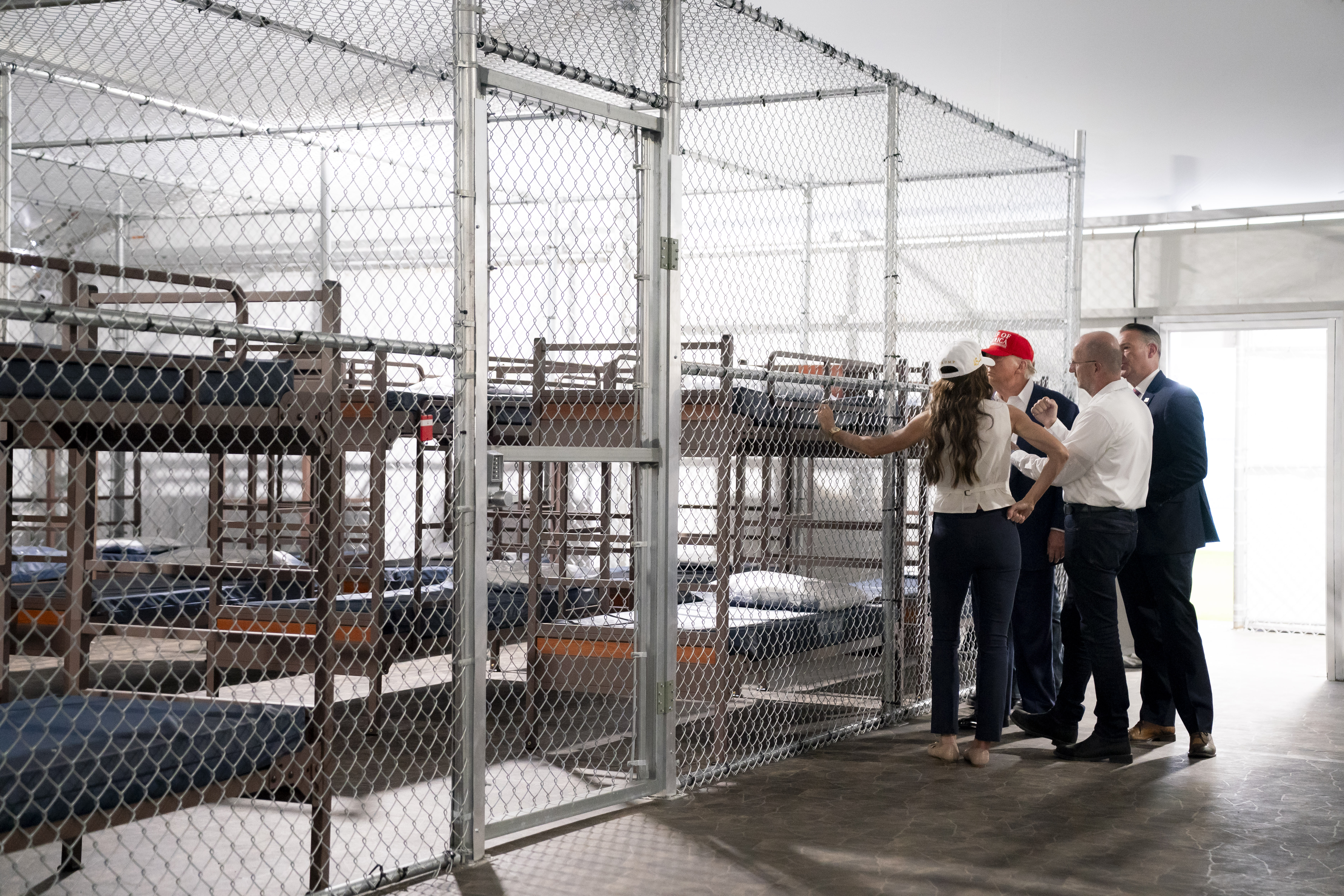
President Donald Trump visiting the newly-built Alligator Alcatraz immigrant detention facility in Florida.

President Donald Trump and his administration have pursued a deportation policy characterized as "hardline" with "huge camps" for immigrant detention. According to a mid-July list of the population detainted at the immigration detention center in the Everglades dubbed "Alligator Alcatraz", more than 95% of the detainees originated from Latin American countries, with approximately 20% from Guatemala, ~20% from Mexico, and another ~10% from Cuba. On July 16, 2025, the American Civil Liberties Union, the ACLU of Florida, and Americans for Immigrant Justice filed a class action suit claiming the Trump administration violates the First Amendment and Fifth Amendment rights of people being detained, as well as the First Amendment rights of legal service organizations and law firms with clients held at the facility.

Many immigrant families cannot enjoy doing everyday activities without exercising caution because they fear encountering immigration officers, which limits their involvement in community events. Undocumented families also may not trust government institutions and services. Because of their fear of encountering immigration officers, immigrants may feel ostracized and isolated which can lead to the development of mental health issues such as depression and anxiety. The harmful effects of being ostracized from the rest of society are not limited to just that of undocumented immigrants but it affects the entire family even if some of the members are of legal status. Children often reported having been victims of bullying in school by classmates because their parents are undocumented. This can cause them to feel isolated and develop a sense of inferiority which can negatively impact their academic performance.

=== Stress ===
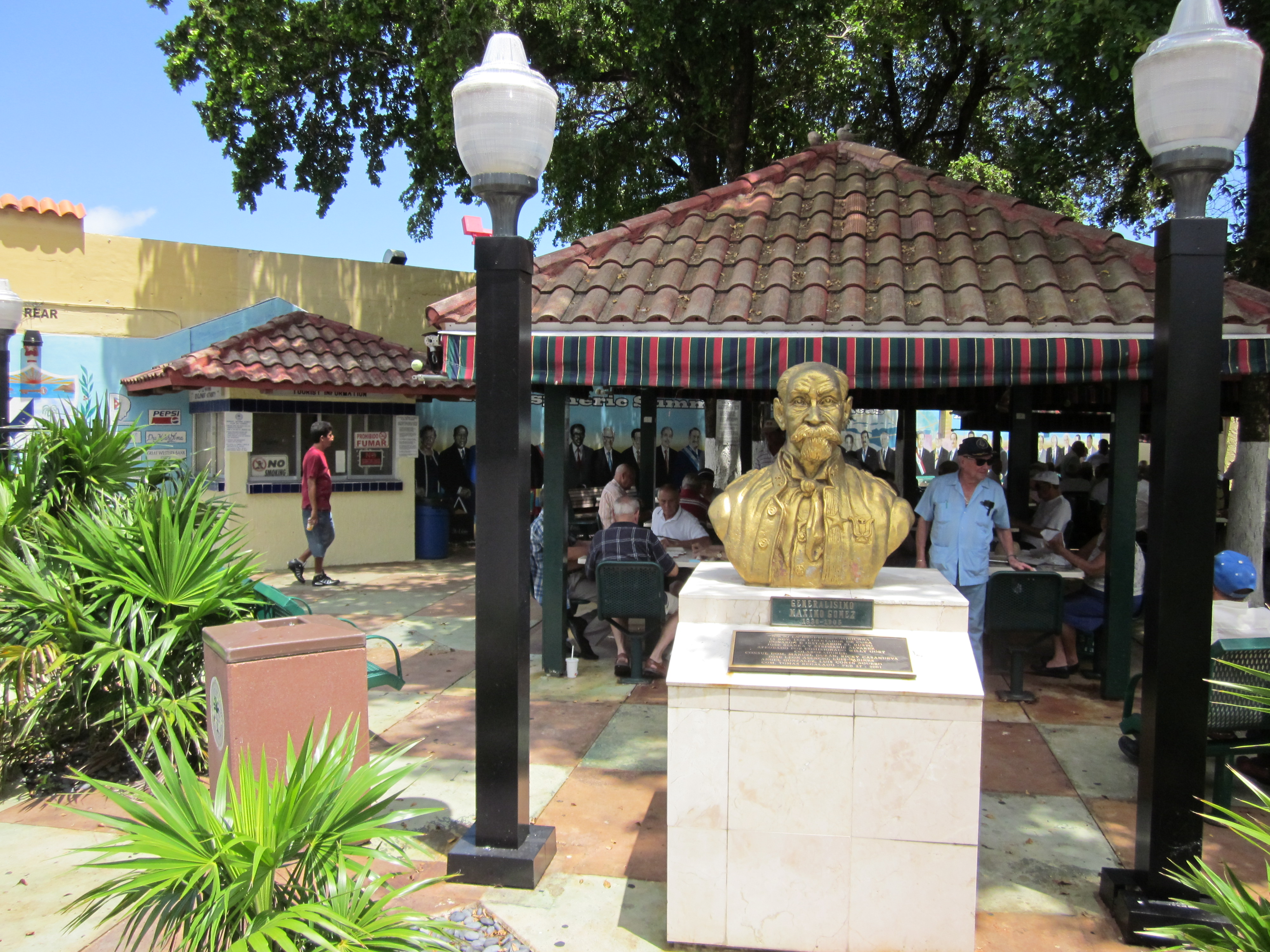
Little Havana is a hub for the Cuban community of Miami, Florida.

Despite the struggles Hispanic families encounter, they have found ways to keep motivated. Many immigrants use religion as a source of motivation. Mexican immigrants believed that the difficulties they face are a part of God's bigger plan and believe their life will get better in the end. They kept their faith strong and pray every day, hoping that God will keep their families safe. Immigrants participate in church services and bond with other immigrants that share the same experiences. Undocumented Hispanics also find support from friends, family and the community that serve as coping mechanisms. Some Hispanics state that their children are the reason they have the strength to keep on going. They want their children to have a future and give them things they are not able to have themselves. The community is able to provide certain resources that immigrant families need such as tutoring for their children, financial assistance and counseling services. Some identified that maintaining a positive mental attitude helped them cope with the stresses they experience. Many immigrants refuse to live their life in constant fear which leads to depression in order to enjoy life in the United States. Since many immigrants have unstable sources of income, many plan ahead in order to prevent future financial stress. They put money aside and find ways to save money instead of spend it such as learning to fix appliances themselves.

=== Poverty and mental health ===
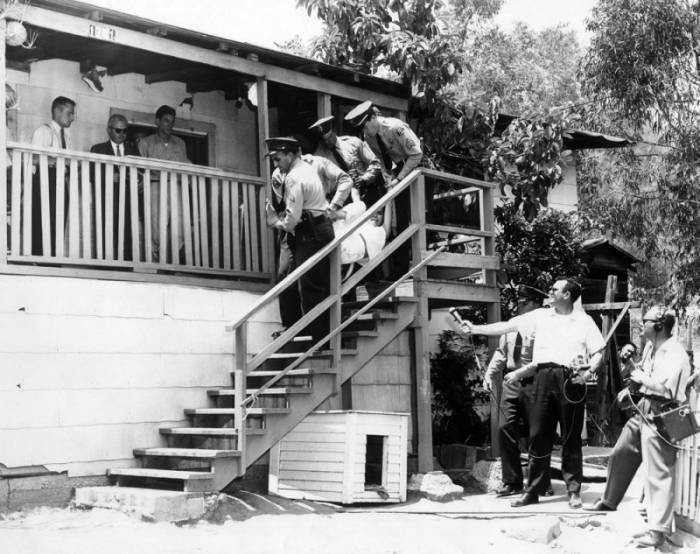
In 1958, Los Angeles County Sheriffs forcibly evicted the Mexican/Chicano community of Chavez Ravine for the construction of Dodger Stadium, in a dispute known as the "Battle of Chavez Ravine".

Many Hispanic families migrate to find better economic opportunities in order to send remittances back home. Being undocumented limits the possibilities of jobs that immigrants undertake and many struggle to find a stable job. Many Hispanics report that companies turned them down because they do not have a Social Security number. If they are able to obtain a job, immigrants risk losing it if their employer finds out they are unable to provide proof of residency or citizenship. Many look towards agencies that do not ask for identification, but those jobs are often unreliable. In order to prevent themselves from being detained and deported, many have to work under exploitation. In a study, a participant reported "If someone knows that you don't have the papers ... that person is a danger. Many people will con them ... if they know you don't have the papers, with everything they say 'hey I'm going to call immigration on you.'" These conditions lower the income that Hispanic families bring to their household and some find living each day very difficult. When an undocumented parent is deported or detained, income will be lowered significantly if the other parent also supports the family financially. The parent who is left has to look after the family and might find working difficult to manage along with other responsibilities. Even if families are not separated, Hispanics are constantly living in fear that they will lose their economic footing.

Living in poverty has been linked to depression, low self-esteem, loneliness, crime activities and frequent drug use among youth. Families with low incomes are unable to afford adequate housing and some of them are evicted. The environment in which the children of undocumented immigrants grow up in is often composed of poor air quality, noise, and toxins which prevent healthy development. Furthermore, these neighborhoods are prone to violence and gang activities, forcing the families to live in constant fear which can contribute to the development of PTSD, aggression and depression.

== Economic outlook ==
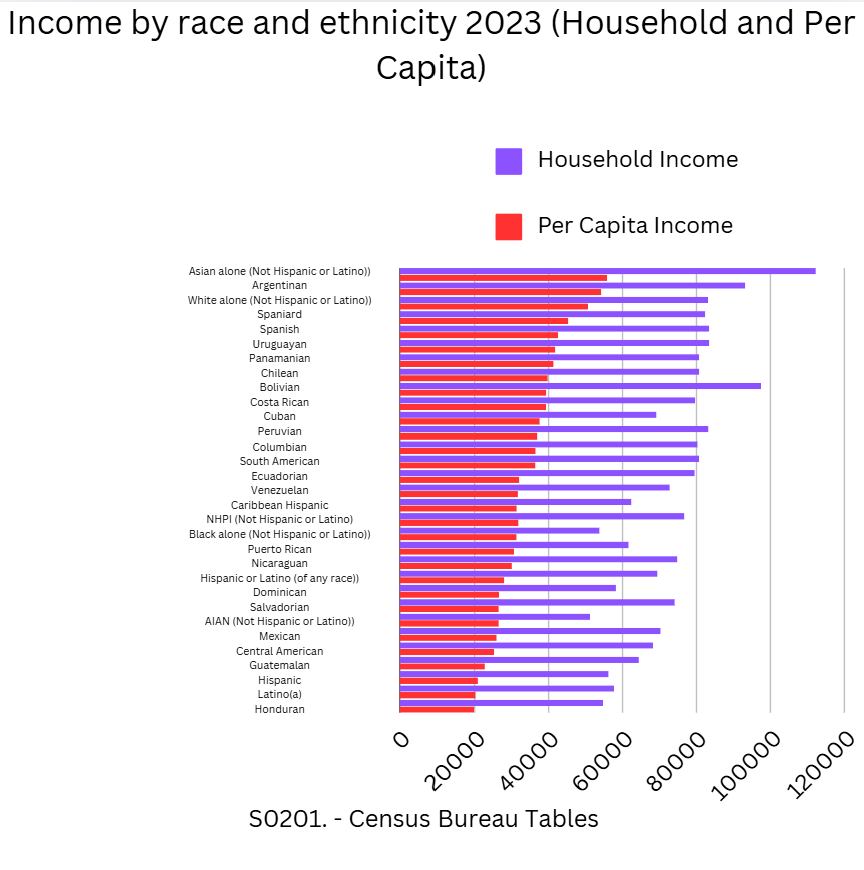
Income by Race and Ethnicity and Hispanic / Latino origins 2023 shows the economic status of different ethnic groups

=== Median income ===
In 2017, the US census reported the median household incomes of Hispanic Americans to be $50,486. This is the third consecutive annual increase in median household income for Hispanic-origin households.

=== Poverty ===
According to the US census, the poverty rate Hispanics was 18.3 percent in 2017, down from 19.4 percent in 2016. Hispanics accounted for 10.8 million individuals in poverty. In comparison, the average poverty rates in 2017 for non-Hispanic White Americans was 8.7 percent with 17 million individuals in poverty, Asian Americans was 10.0 percent with 2 million individuals in poverty, and African Americans was 21.2 percent with 9 million individuals in poverty.

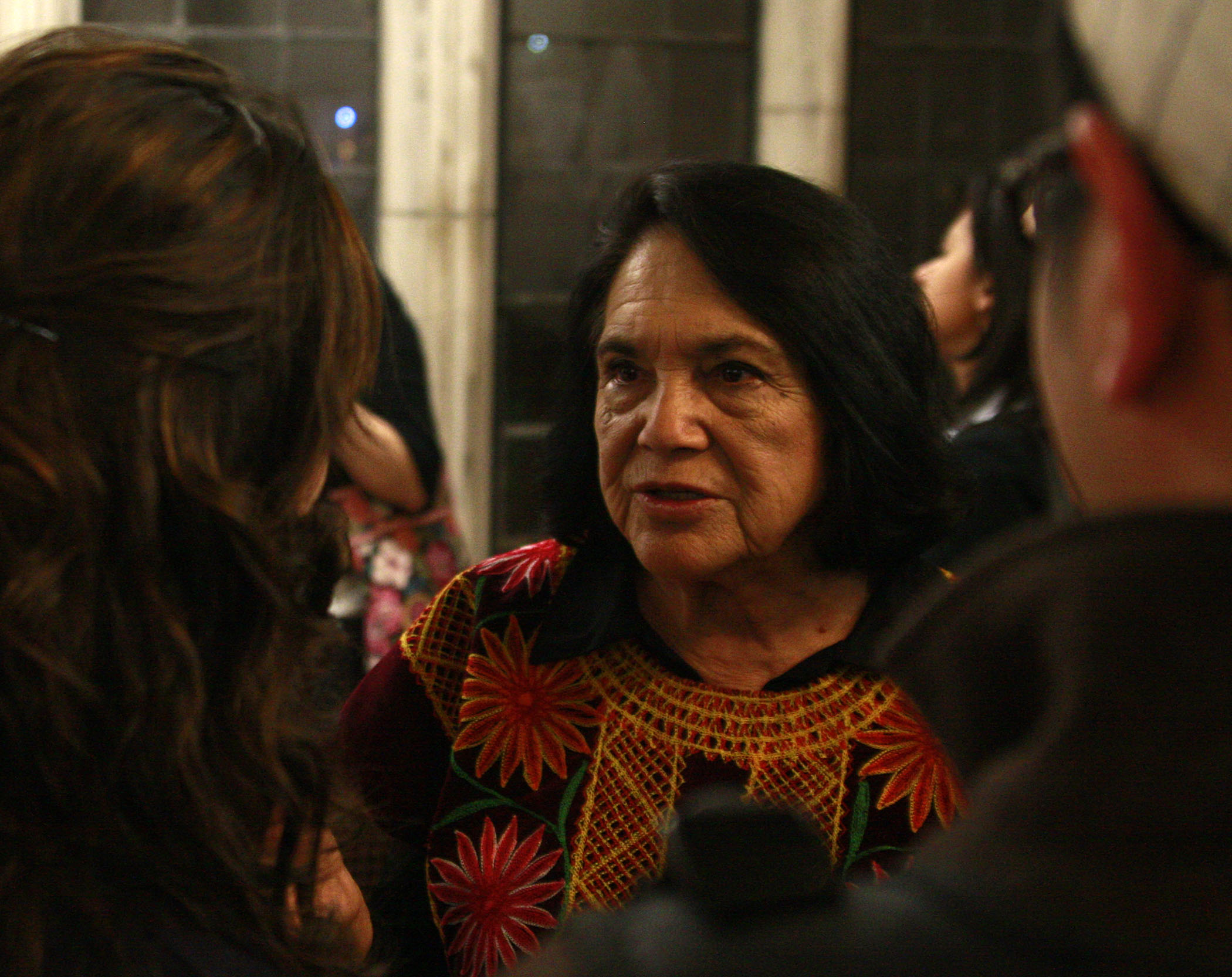
Dolores Huerta is an activist for workers', immigrants' and women's rights. She was the first Hispanic inducted into the National Women's Hall of Fame, in 1993.

Among the largest Hispanic groups during 2015 was: Honduran Americans & Dominican Americans (27%), Guatemalan Americans (26%), Puerto Ricans (24%), Mexican Americans (23%), Salvadoran Americans (20%), Cuban Americans and Venezuelan Americans (17%), Ecuadorian Americans (15%), Nicaraguan Americans (14%), Colombian Americans (13%), Argentinian Americans (11%), and Peruvian Americans (10%).

Poverty affects many underrepresented students as racial/ethnic minorities tend to stay isolated within pockets of low-income communities. This results in several inequalities, such as "school offerings, teacher quality, curriculum, counseling and all manner of things that both keep students engaged in school and prepare them to graduate". In the case of Hispanics, the poverty rate for Hispanic children in 2004 was 28.6 percent. Moreover, with this lack of resources, schools reproduce these inequalities for generations to come. In order to assuage poverty, many Hispanic families can turn to social and community services as resources.

== Cultural matters ==
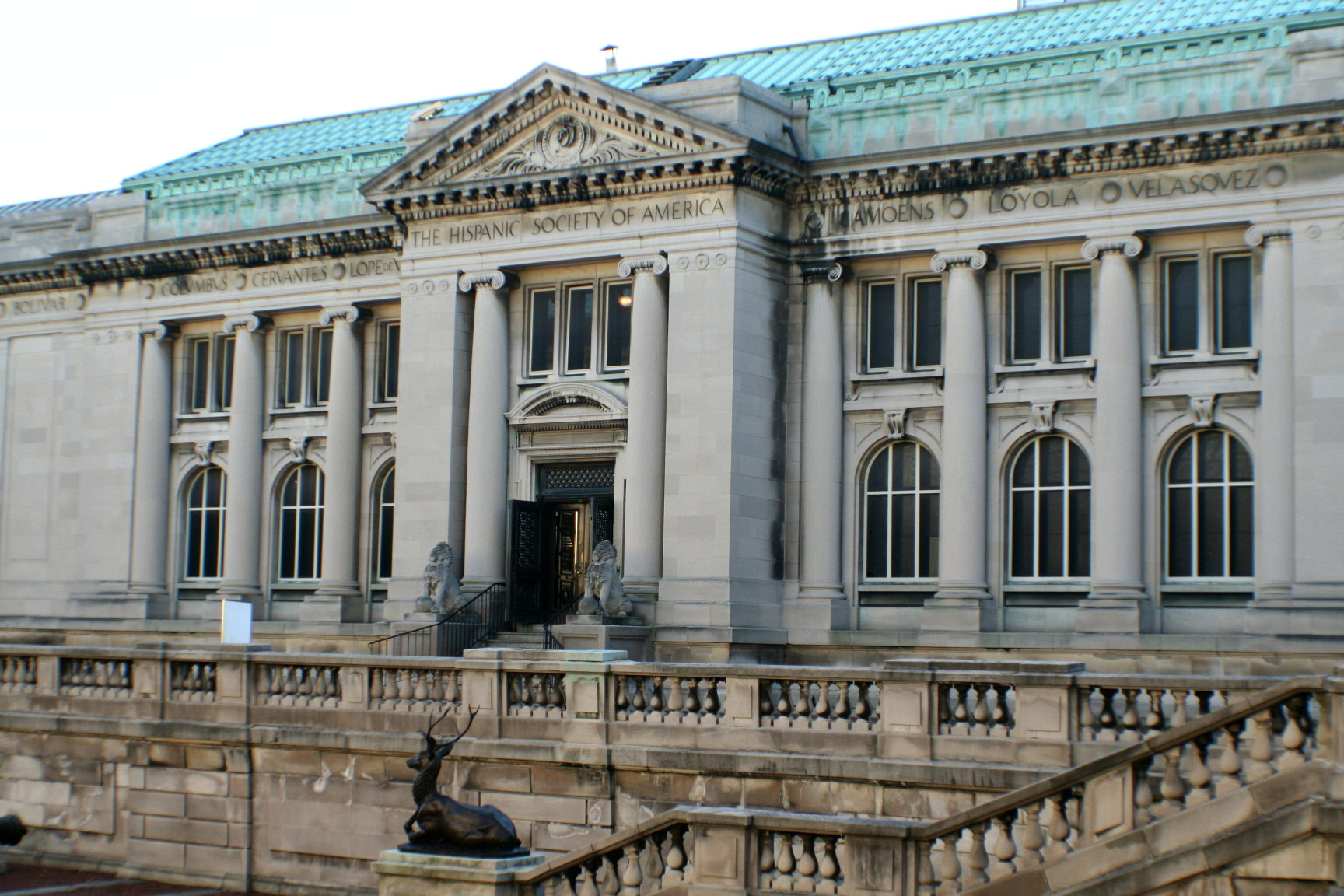
The Hispanic Society of America was founded in 1904.

The geographic, political, social, economic and racial diversity of Hispanic Americans makes all Hispanics very different depending on their family heritage and/or national origin. Many times, there are many cultural similarities between Hispanics from neighboring countries than from more distant countries, i.e. Spanish Caribbean, Southern Cone, Central America etc. Yet several features tend to unite Hispanics from these diverse backgrounds.

=== Language ===
==== Spanish ====
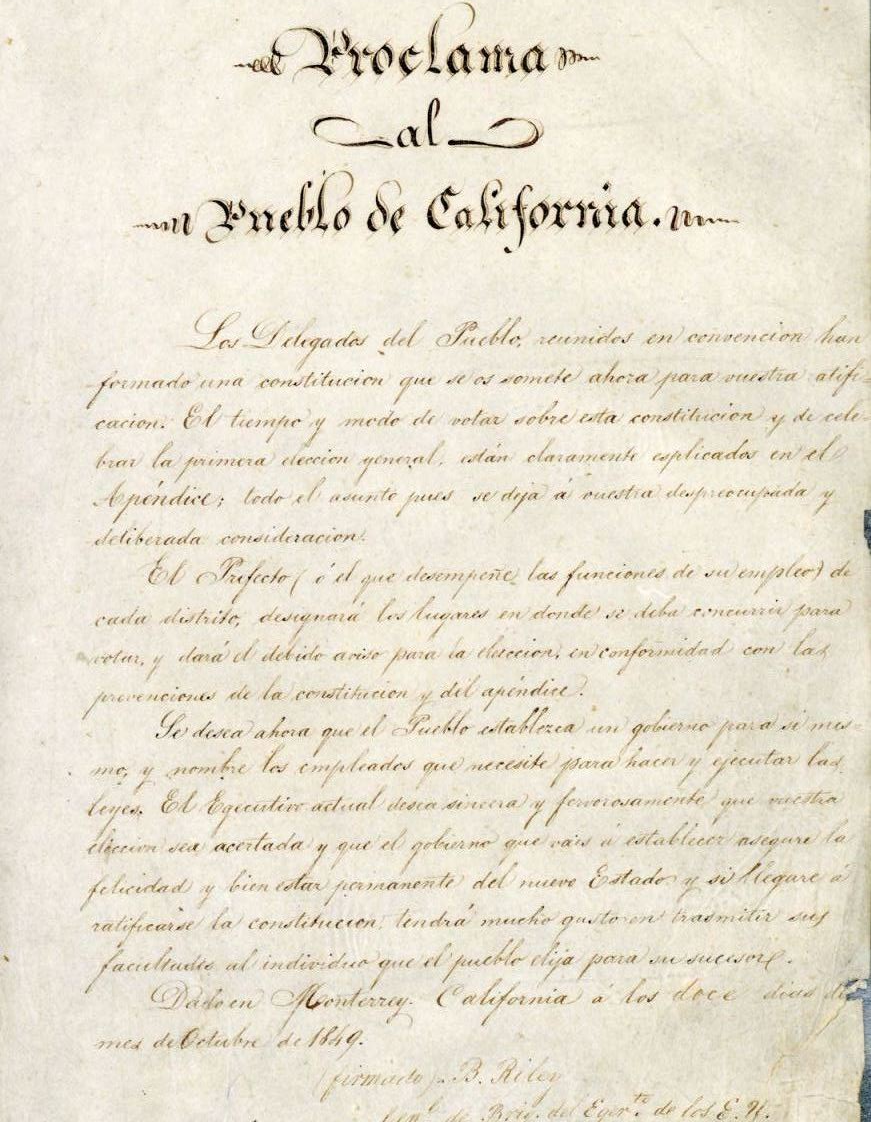
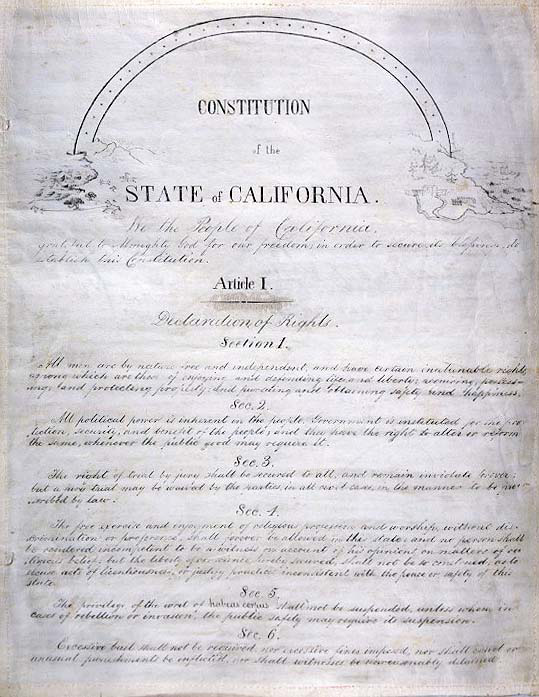
The Constitution of California was written in both Spanish (left) and English (right) in 1849.

As one of the most important uniting factors of Hispanic Americans, Spanish is an important part of Hispanic culture. Teaching Spanish to children is often one of the most valued skills taught amongst Hispanic families. Spanish is not only closely tied with the person's family, heritage, and overall culture, but valued for increased opportunities in business and one's future professional career. A 2013 Pew Research survey showed that 95% of Hispanics adults said "it's important that future generations of Hispanics speak Spanish". Given the United States' proximity to other Spanish-speaking countries, Spanish is being passed on to future American generations. Amongst second-generation Hispanics, 80% speak fluent Spanish, and amongst third-generation Hispanics, 40% speak fluent Spanish. Spanish is also the most popular language taught in the United States.

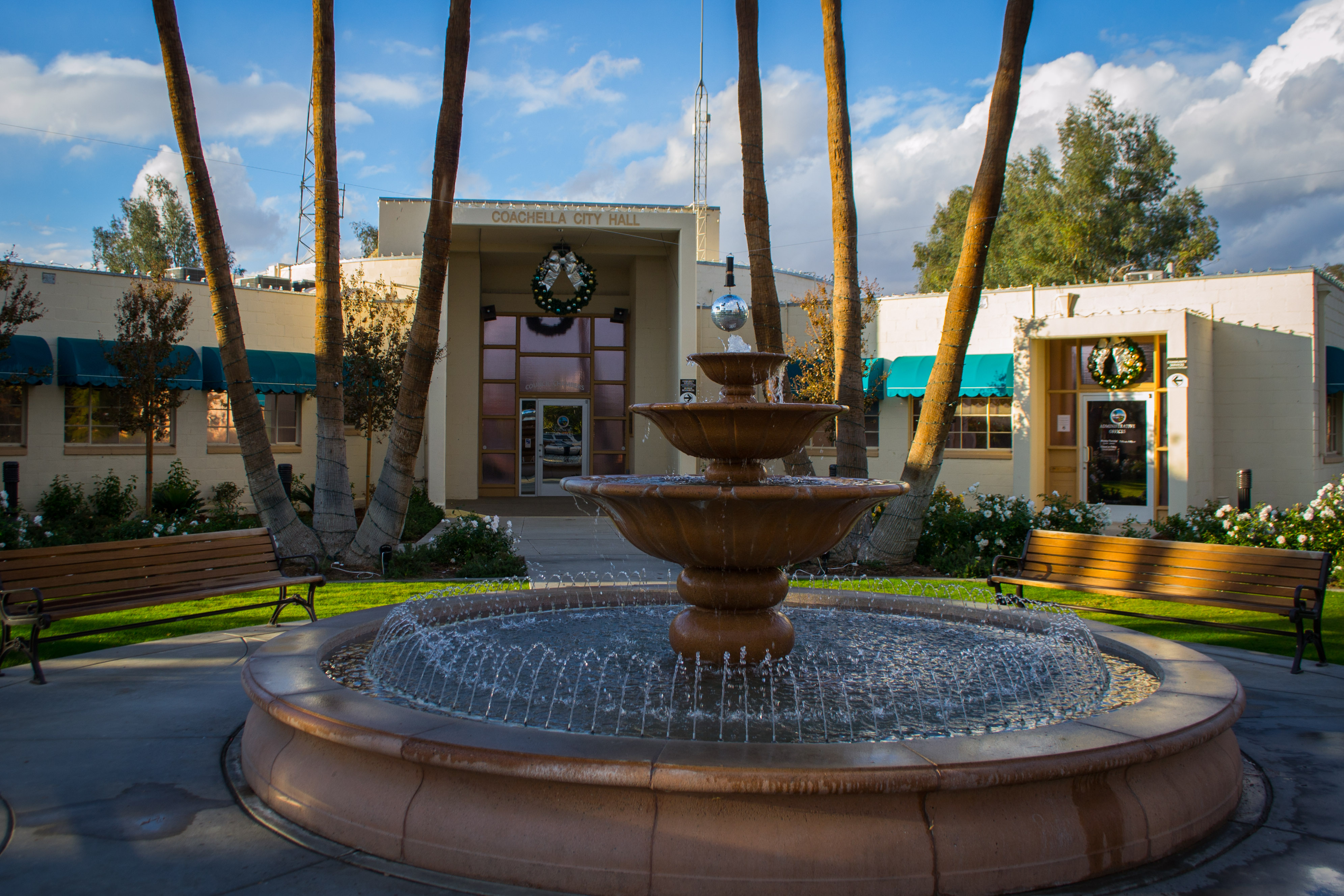
Coachella is an example of a city government that is officially bilingual in English and Spanish.

Hispanics have revived the Spanish language in the United States, first brought to North America during the Spanish colonial period in the 16th century. Spanish is the oldest European language in the United States, spoken uninterruptedly for four and a half centuries, since the founding of Saint Augustine, Florida in 1565. As of 2006 90% of all Hispanics spoke English, and at least 78% speak fluent Spanish. Additionally, 2.8 million non-Hispanic Americans also speak Spanish at home for a total of 41.1 million.

With 40% of Hispanic Americans being immigrants, and with many of the 60% who are US-born being the children or grandchildren of immigrants, bilingualism is the norm in the community at large. At home, at least 69% of all Hispanics over the age of five are bilingual in English and Spanish, whereas up to 22% are monolingual English-speakers, and 9% are monolingual Spanish speakers. Another 0.4% speak a language other than English and Spanish at home.

==== American Spanish dialects ====
Spanish speakers in the United States
Year	Number of speakers	Percent of population
1980	11.0 million	5%
1990	17.3 million	7%
2000	28.1 million	10%
2010	37.0 million	13%
2012	38.3 million	13%
2020*	40.0 million	14%
*-Projected; sources:

The Spanish dialects spoken in the United States differ depending on the country of origin of the person or the person's family heritage. However, generally, Spanish spoken in the Southwest is Mexican Spanish or Chicano Spanish. A variety of Spanish native to the Southwest spoken by descendants of the early Spanish colonists in New Mexico and Colorado is known as Traditional New Mexican Spanish. One of the major distinctions of Traditional New Mexican Spanish is its use of distinct vocabulary and grammatical forms that make New Mexican Spanish unique amongst Spanish dialects. The Spanish spoken in the East Coast is generally Caribbean Spanish and is heavily influenced by the Spanish of Cuba, the Dominican Republic, and Puerto Rico. Isleño Spanish, descended from Canarian Spanish, is the historic Spanish dialect spoken by the descendants of the earliest Spanish colonists beginning in the 18th century in Louisiana. Spanish spoken elsewhere throughout the country varies, although is generally Mexican Spanish.

Heritage Spanish speakers tend to speak Spanish with near-native level phonology, but a more limited command of morphosyntax. Hispanics who speak Spanish as a second language often speak with English accents.

==== Spanglish and English dialects ====
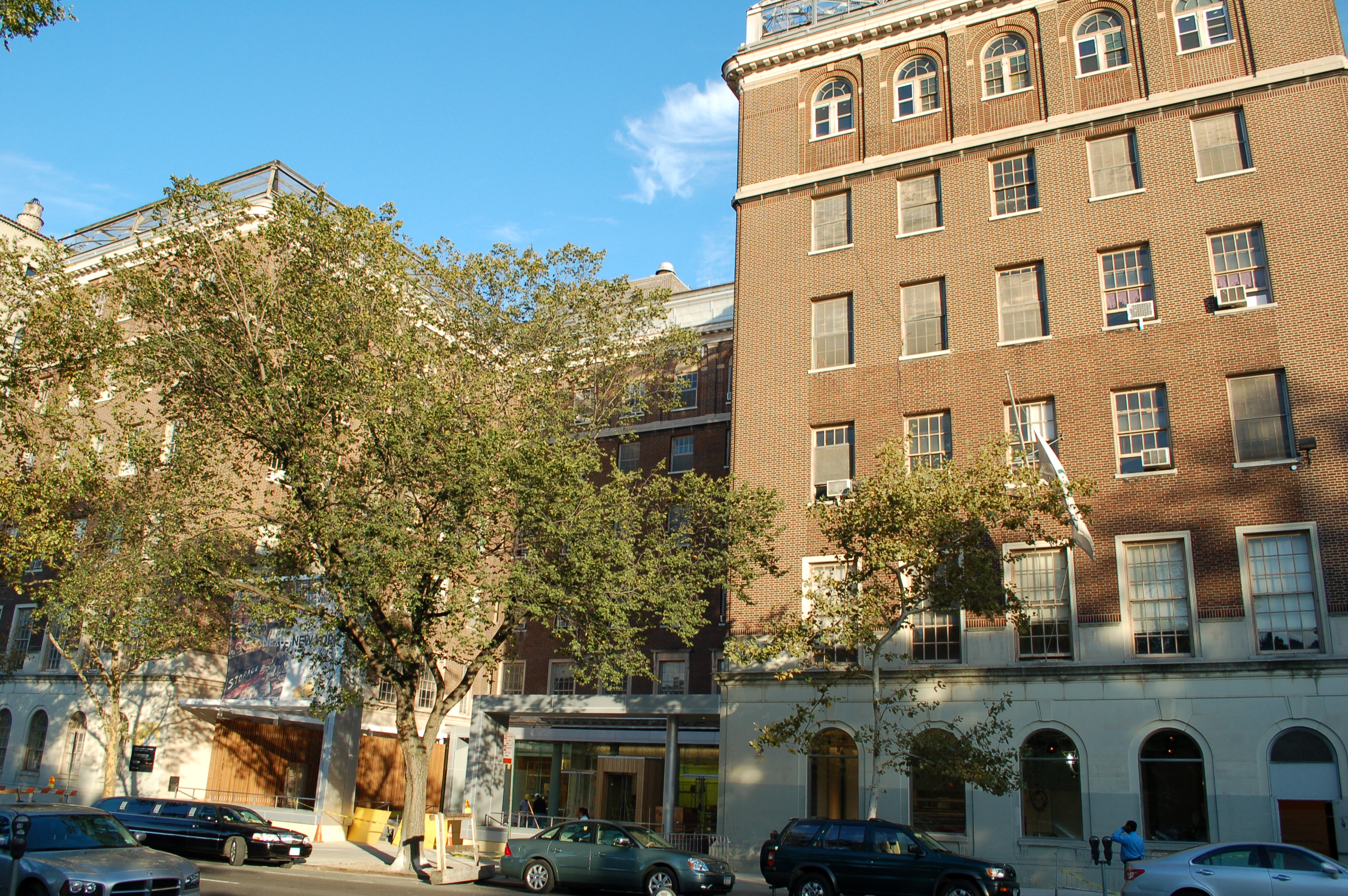
El Museo del Barrio, in Manhattan, is the oldest museum in the country dedicated to Latino art.

Hispanics have influenced the way Americans speak with the introduction of many Spanish words into the English language. Amongst younger generations of Hispanics, Spanglish, a term for any mix of Spanish and English, is common in speaking. As they are fluent in both languages, speakers will often switch between Spanish and English throughout the conversation. Spanglish is particularly common in Hispanic-majority cities and communities such as Miami, Hialeah, San Antonio, Los Angeles and parts of New York City.

Hispanics have also influenced the way English is spoken in the United States. In Miami, for example, the Miami dialect has evolved as the most common form of English spoken and heard in Miami today. This is a native dialect of English, and was developed amongst second and third generations of Cuban Americans in Miami. Today, it is commonly heard everywhere throughout the city. Gloria Estefan and Enrique Iglesias are examples of people who speak with the Miami dialect. Another major English dialect is spoken by Chicanos and Tejanos in the Southwestern United States, called Chicano English. George Lopez and Selena are examples of speakers of Chicano English. An English dialect spoken by Puerto Ricans and other Hispanic groups is called New York Latino English; Jennifer Lopez and Cardi B are examples of people who speak with the New York Latino dialect.

When speaking in English, American Hispanics may often insert Spanish tag and filler items such as tú sabes, este, and órale, into sentences as a marker of ethnic identity and solidarity. The same often occurs with grammatical words like pero.

=== Religion ===
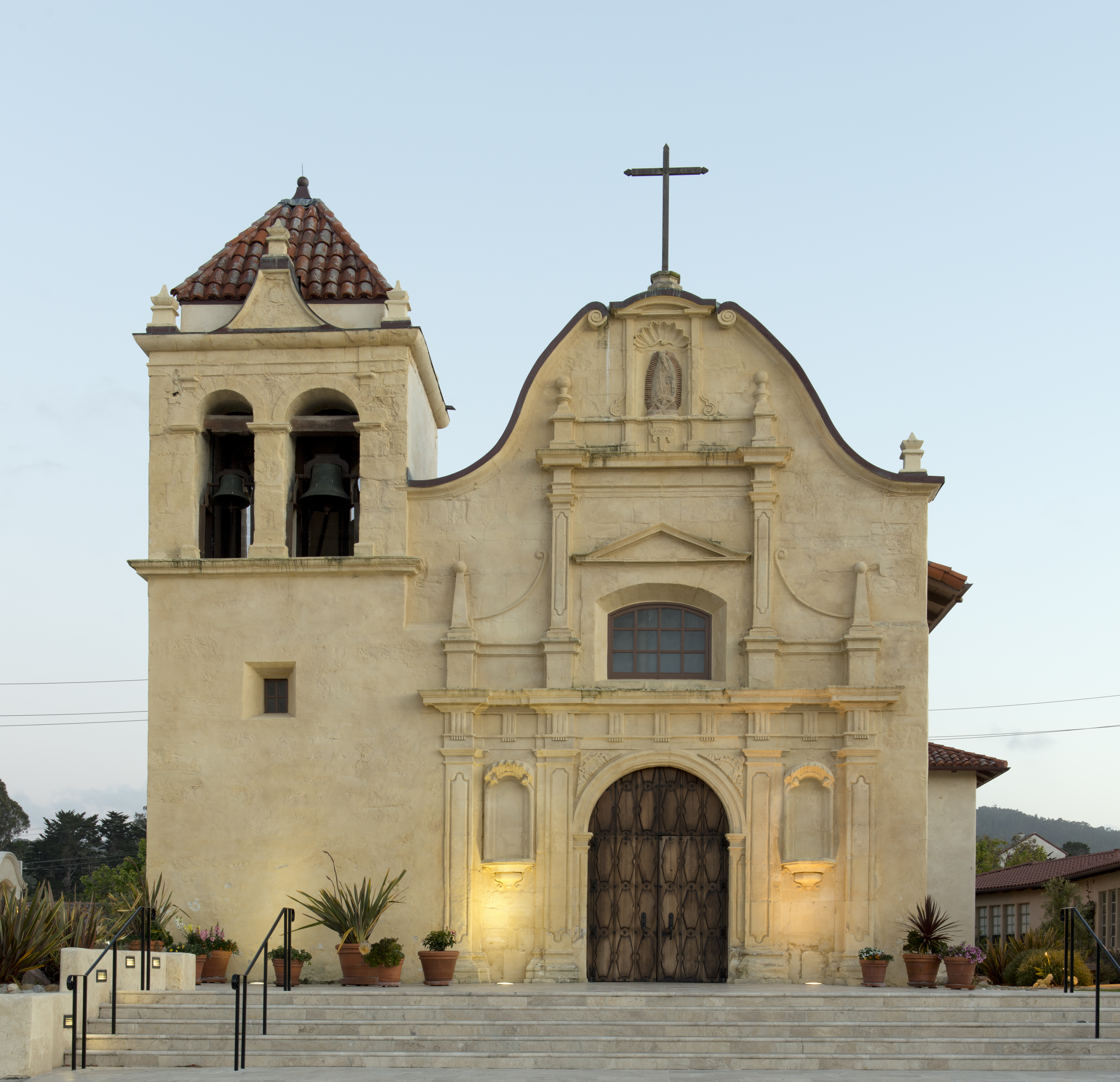
Built in 1791, the Cathedral of San Carlos Borromeo in Monterey, California is the oldest serving cathedral in the country.

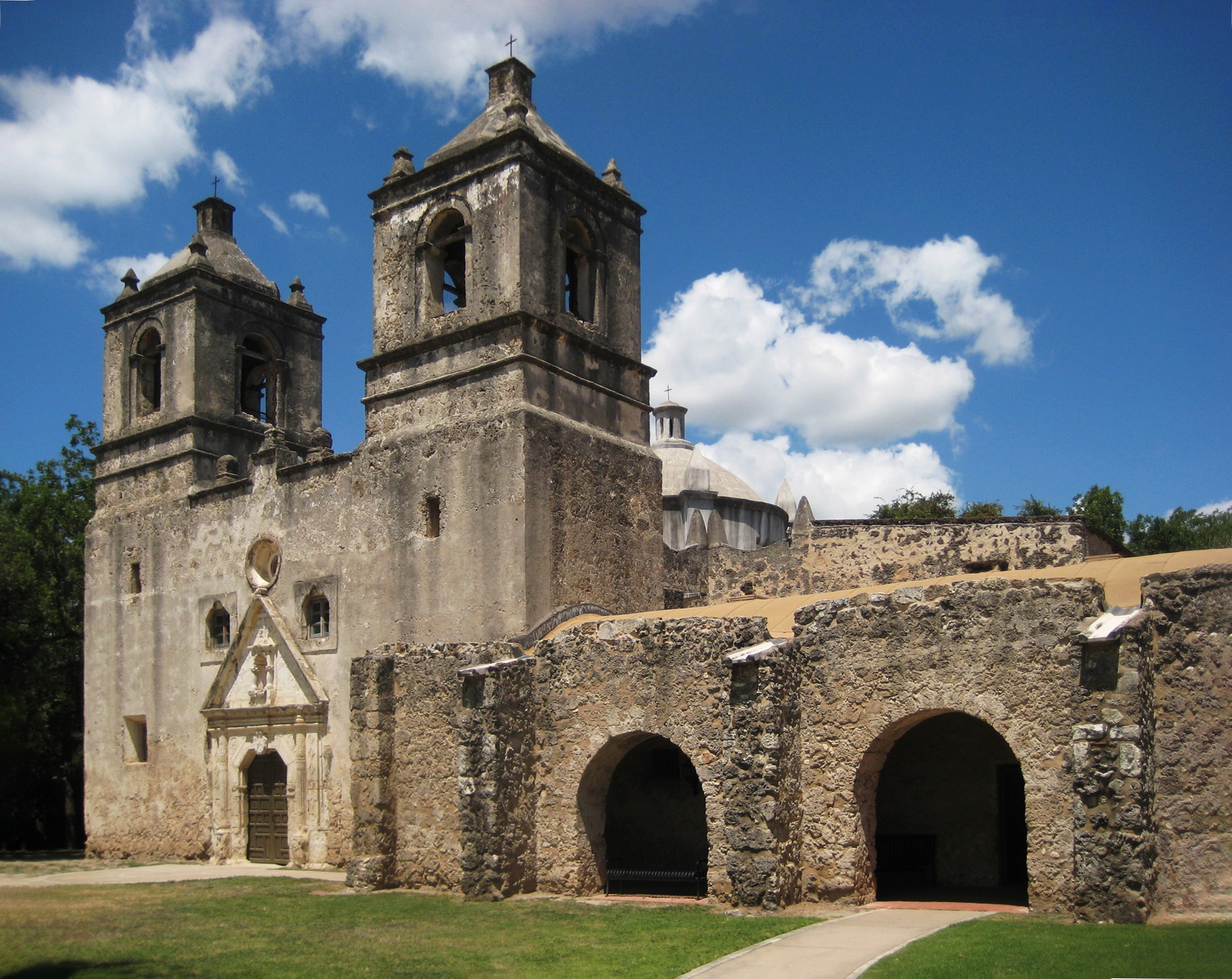
San Antonio Missions National Park in Texas a UNESCO World Heritage Site comprising four historic mission sites.

According to a Pew Center study which was conducted in 2019, the majority of Hispanic Americans are Christians (72%), Among American Hispanics, as of 2018–19, 47% are Catholic, 24% are Protestant, 1% are Mormon, less than 1% are Orthodox Christian, 3% are members of non-Christian faiths, and 23% are unaffiliated. The proportion of Hispanics who are Catholic has dropped from 2009 (when it was 57%), while the proportion of unaffiliated Hispanics has increased since 2009 (when it was 15%). Among Hispanic Protestant community, most are evangelical, but some belong to mainline denominations. Compared to Catholic, unaffiliated, and mainline Protestant Hispanics; Evangelical Protestant Hispanics are substantially more likely to attend services weekly, pray daily, and adhere to biblical liberalism. As of 2014, about 67% of Hispanic Protestants and about 52% of Hispanic Catholics were renewalist, meaning that they described themselves as Pentecostal or charismatic Christians (in the Catholic tradition, called Catholic charismatic renewal).

Catholic affiliation is much higher among first-generation Hispanic immigrants than it is among second and third-generation Hispanic immigrants, who exhibit a fairly high rate of conversion to Protestantism or the unaffiliated camp. According to Andrew Greeley, as many as 600,000 American Hispanics leave Catholicism for Protestant churches every year, and this figure is much higher in Texas and Florida. Hispanic Catholics are developing youth and social programs to retain members.

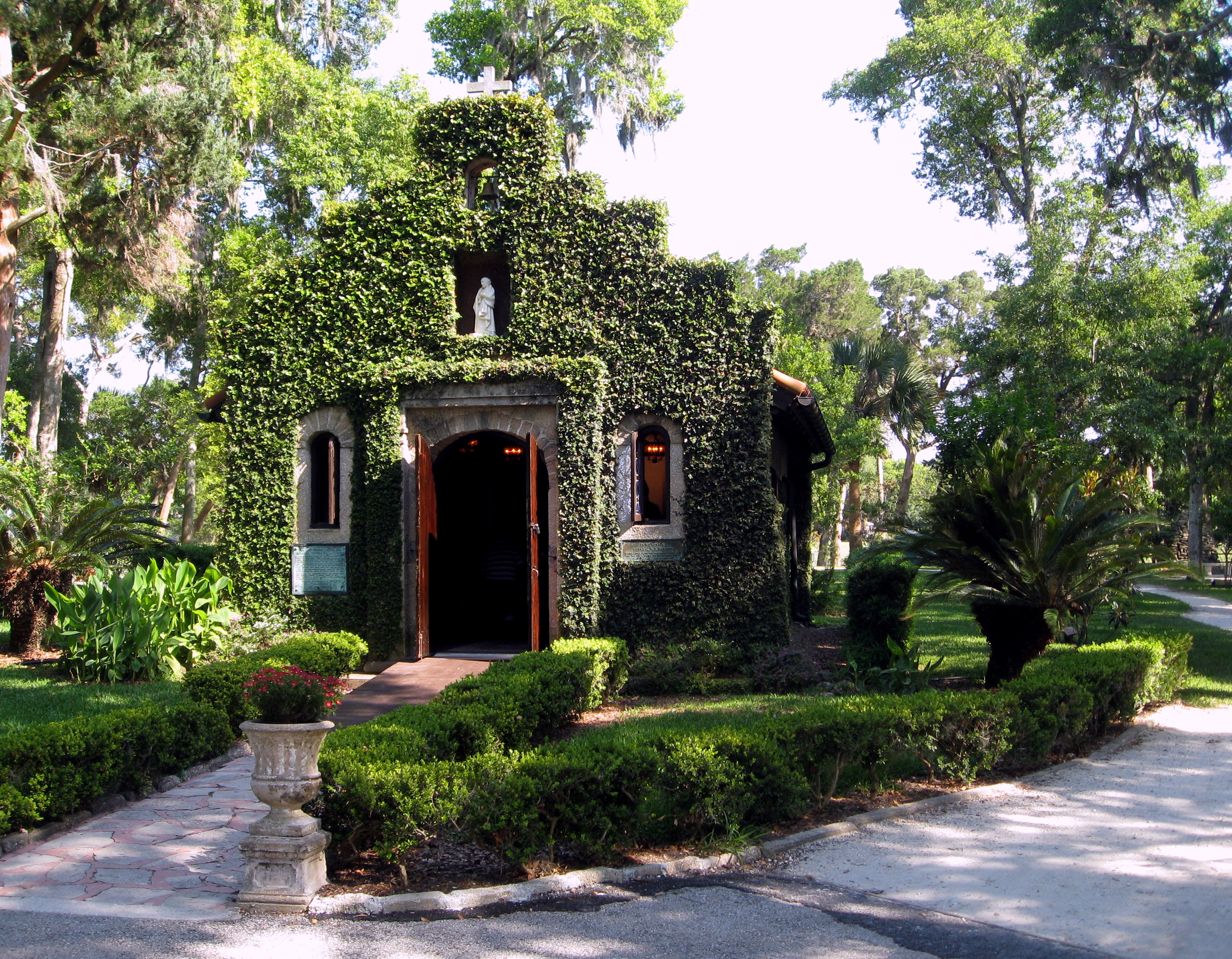
Founded in 1609, the National Shrine of Our Lady of La Leche, in St. Augustine, Florida, is the oldest shrine in the country.

Hispanics make up a substantial proportion (almost 40%) of Catholics in the United States, although the number of American Hispanic priests is low relative to Hispanic membership in the church. In 2019, José Horacio Gómez, Archbishop of Los Angeles and a naturalized American citizen born in Mexico, was elected as president of the US Conference of Catholic Bishops.

Pew Research Center: Hispanic and Latino Religious Affiliation (2010–2022)
Date	Catholicism	Unaffiliated	Evangelical Protestant	Non-Evangelical Protestant	Other religion
2022	43	30	15	6	4
2021	46	25	14	7	5
2018	49	20	19	7	3
2016	54	17	15	7	5
2015	54	17	18	7	4
2014	58	12	14	7	7
2013	55	18	17	7	3
2012	58	13	15	6	3
2011	62	14	13	6	3
2010	67	10	12	5	3

=== Media ===
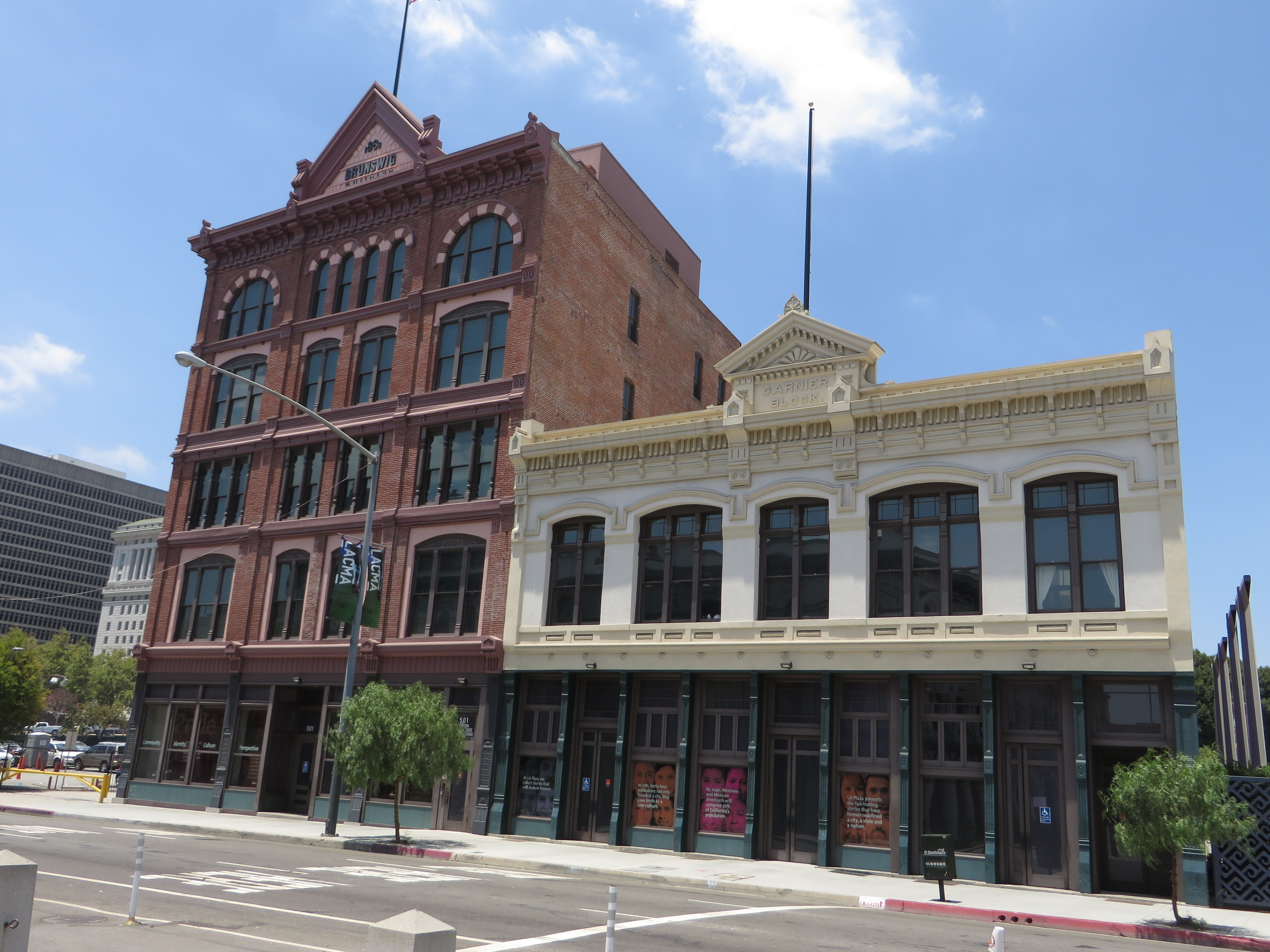
LA Plaza de Cultura y Artes is a museum and cultural center in Los Angeles.

The United States is home to thousands of Spanish-language media outlets, which range in size from giant commercial and some non-commercial broadcasting networks and major magazines with circulations numbering in the millions, to low-power AM radio stations with listeners numbering in the hundreds. There are hundreds of Internet media outlets targeting US Hispanic consumers. Some of the outlets are online versions of their printed counterparts and some online exclusively.

Increased use of Spanish-language media leads to increased levels of group consciousness, according to survey data. The differences in attitudes are due to the diverging goals of Spanish-language and English-language media. The effect of using Spanish-language media serves to promote a sense of group consciousness among Hispanics by reinforcing roots in the Hispanic world and the commonalities among Hispanics of varying national origin.

The first Hispanic-American owned major film studio in the United States is based in Atlanta, Georgia. In 2017, Ozzie and Will Areu purchased Tyler Perry's former studio to establish Areu Bros. Studios.

Hispanics are more likely to use social media such as TikTok and Instagram than non-Hispanics.

==== Radio ====
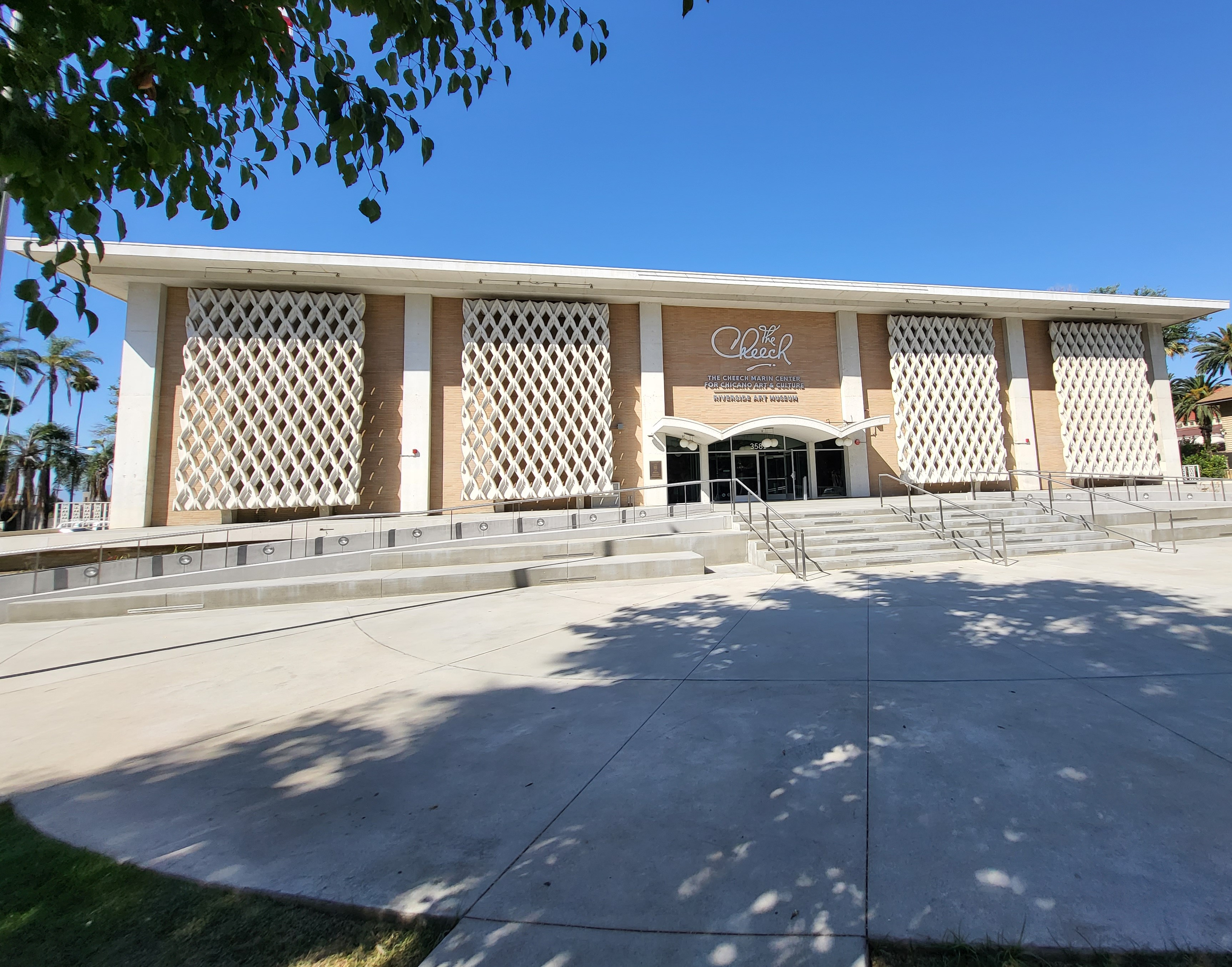
The Cheech Marin Center for Chicano Art & Culture in Riverside, California.

Spanish language radio is the largest non-English broadcasting media. While other foreign language broadcasting declined steadily, Spanish broadcasting grew steadily from the 1920s to the 1970s. The 1930s were boom years. The early success depended on the concentrated geographical audience in Texas and the Southwest. American stations were close to Mexico which enabled a steady circular flow of entertainers, executives and technicians, and stimulated the creative initiatives of Hispanic radio executives, brokers, and advertisers. Ownership was increasingly concentrated in the 1960s and 1970s. The industry sponsored the now-defunct trade publication Sponsor from the late 1940s to 1968. Spanish-language radio has influenced American and Hispanic discourse on key current affairs issues such as citizenship and immigration.

==== Networks ====
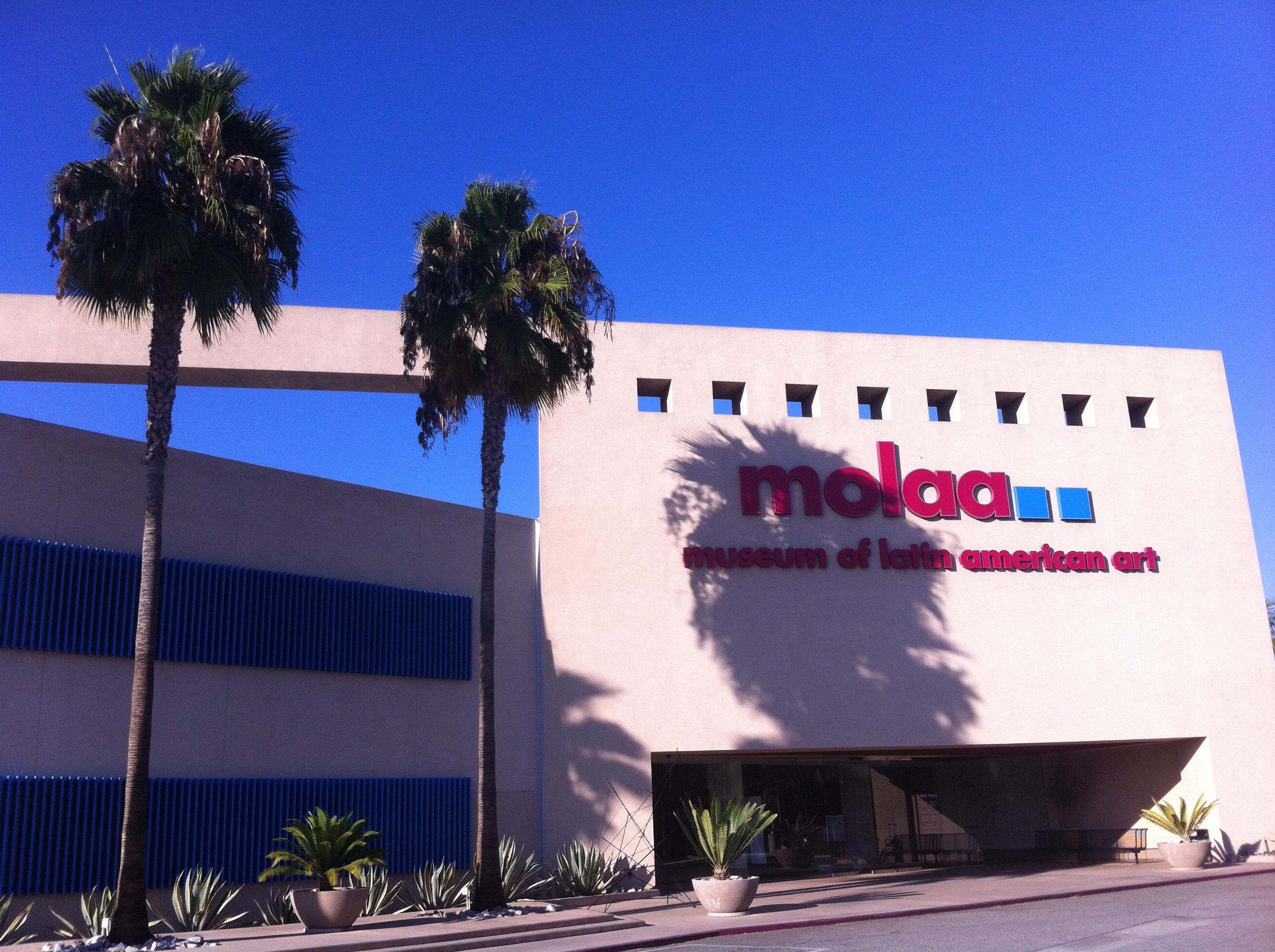
Museum of Latin American Art in Long Beach, California.

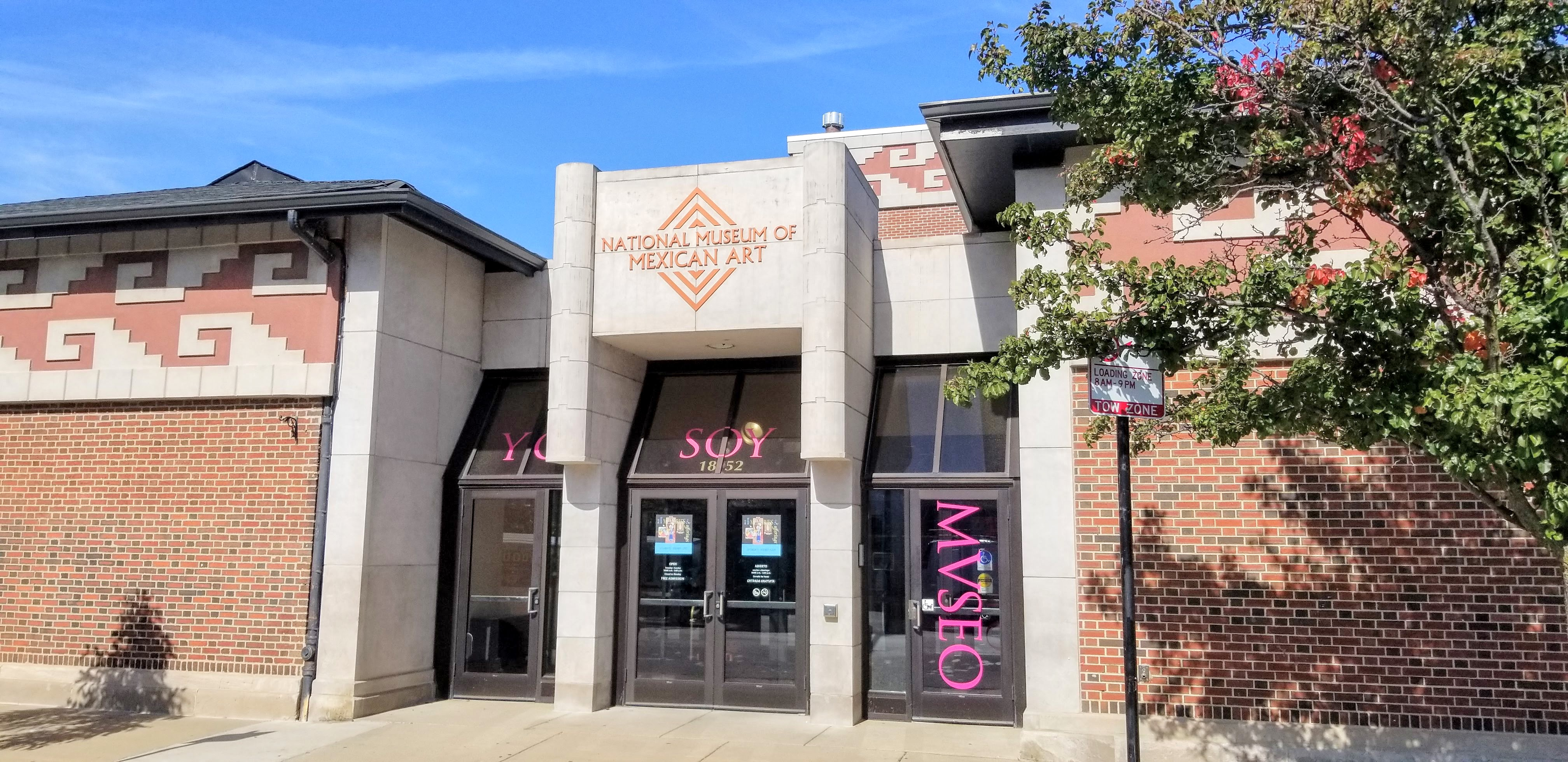
National Museum of Mexican Art in Chicago.

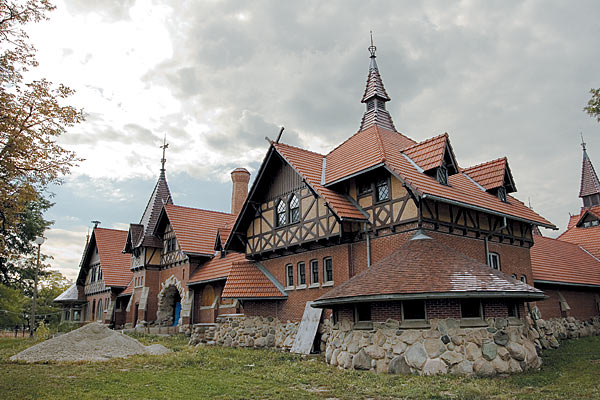
National Museum of Puerto Rican Arts and Culture in Chicago.

Notable Hispanic-oriented media outlets include:

- CNN en Español, a Spanish-language news network based in Atlanta, Georgia;
- ESPN Deportes and Fox Deportes, two Spanish-language sports television networks.
- Telemundo, the second-largest Spanish-language television network in the United States, with affiliates in nearly every major U.S. market, and numerous affiliates internationally;
  - TeleXitos an American Spanish language digital multicast television network owned by NBCUniversal Telemundo Enterprises.
  - Universo, a cable network that produces content for American-born Hispanic audiences;
- Univision, the largest Spanish-language television network in the United States, with affiliates in nearly every major American market, and numerous affiliates internationally. It is the country's fourth-largest network overall;
  - UniMás, an American Spanish language free-to-air television network owned by TelevisaUnivision.
  - Fusion TV, an English television channel targeting Hispanic audiences with news and satire programming;
  - Galavisión, a Spanish-language television channel targeting Hispanic audiences with general entertainment programming;
- Estrella TV, an American Spanish-language broadcast television network owned by the Estrella Media.
- V-me, a Spanish-language television network;
  - Primo TV, an English-language cable channel aimed at Hispanic youth.;
- Azteca América, a Spanish-language television network in the United States, with affiliates in nearly every major American market, and numerous affiliates internationally;
- Fuse, a former music channel that merged with the Hispanic-oriented NuvoTV in 2015.
  - FM, a music-centric channel that replaced NuvoTV following the latter's merger with Fuse in 2015.
- 3ABN Latino, a Spanish-language Christian television network based in West Frankfort, Illinois;
- TBN Enlace USA, a Spanish-language Christian television network based in Tustin, California;

==== Print ====
- La Opinión, a Spanish-language daily newspaper published in Los Angeles, California and distributed throughout the six counties of Southern California. It is the largest Spanish-language newspaper in the United States
- El Nuevo Herald and Diario Las Américas, Spanish-language daily newspapers serving the greater Miami, Florida, market
- El Tiempo Latino a Spanish-language free-circulation weekly newspaper published in Washington, D.C.
- Latina, a magazine for bilingual, bicultural Hispanic women
- People en Español, a Spanish-language magazine counterpart of People
- Vida Latina, a Spanish-language entertainment magazine distributed throughout the Southern United States

=== Sports ===
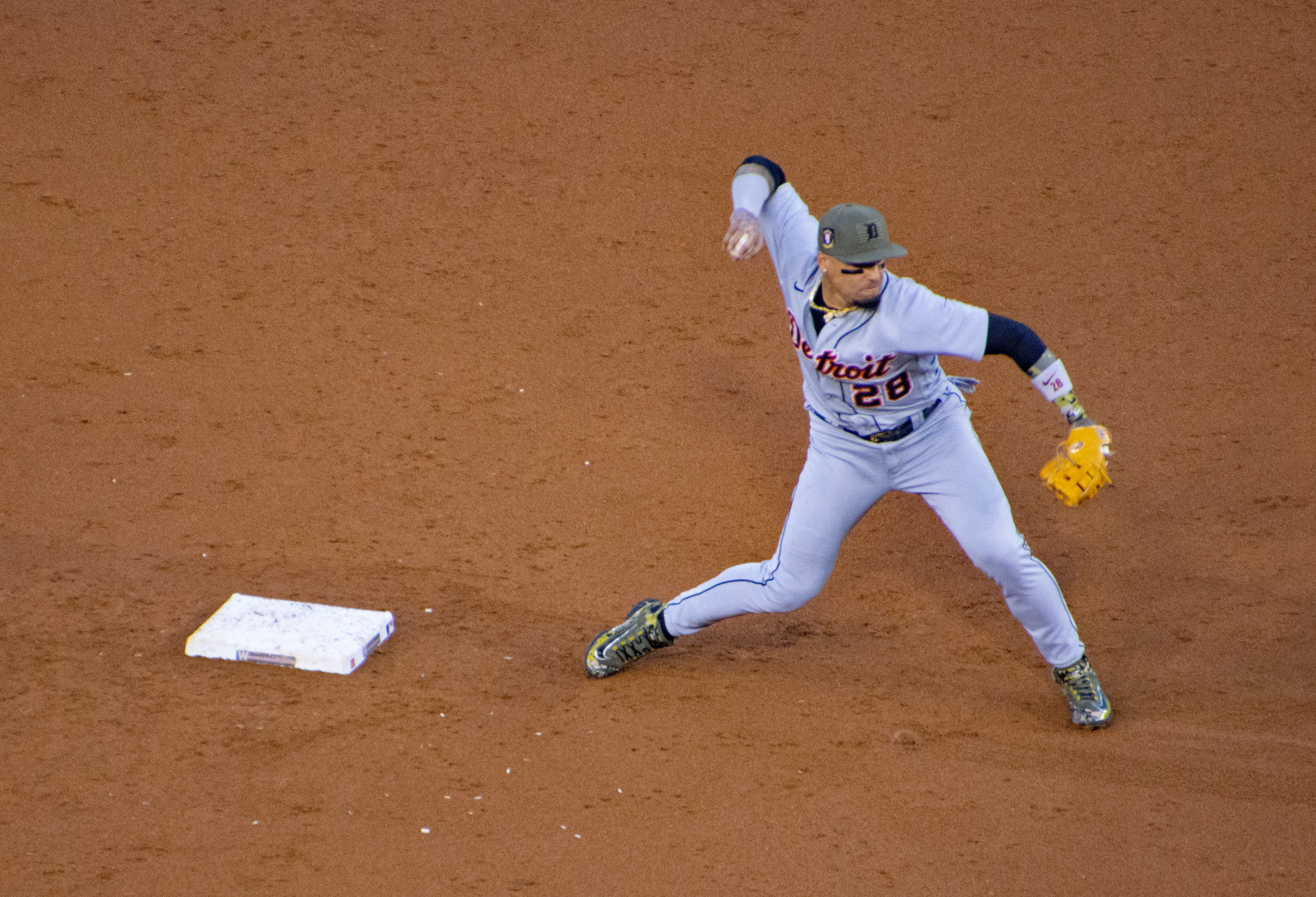
Javier Báez making a baseball play

Soccer is a common sport for Hispanics from outside of the Caribbean region, particularly immigrants. They have played a major role in boosting the sport's popularity in the United States. Baseball is common among Caribbean Hispanics. They and their culture now form a major part of the fanbase and players in MLB.

Other popular sports include American football, basketball, and boxing.

=== Music ===
Because of different cultures throughout the Hispanic world, there are various music forms throughout Hispanic countries, with different sounds and origins. Reggaeton and hip hop are genres that are most popular to Hispanic youth in the United States. Recently Latin trap, trap corridos, and Dominican dembow have gained popularity.

=== Cuisine ===
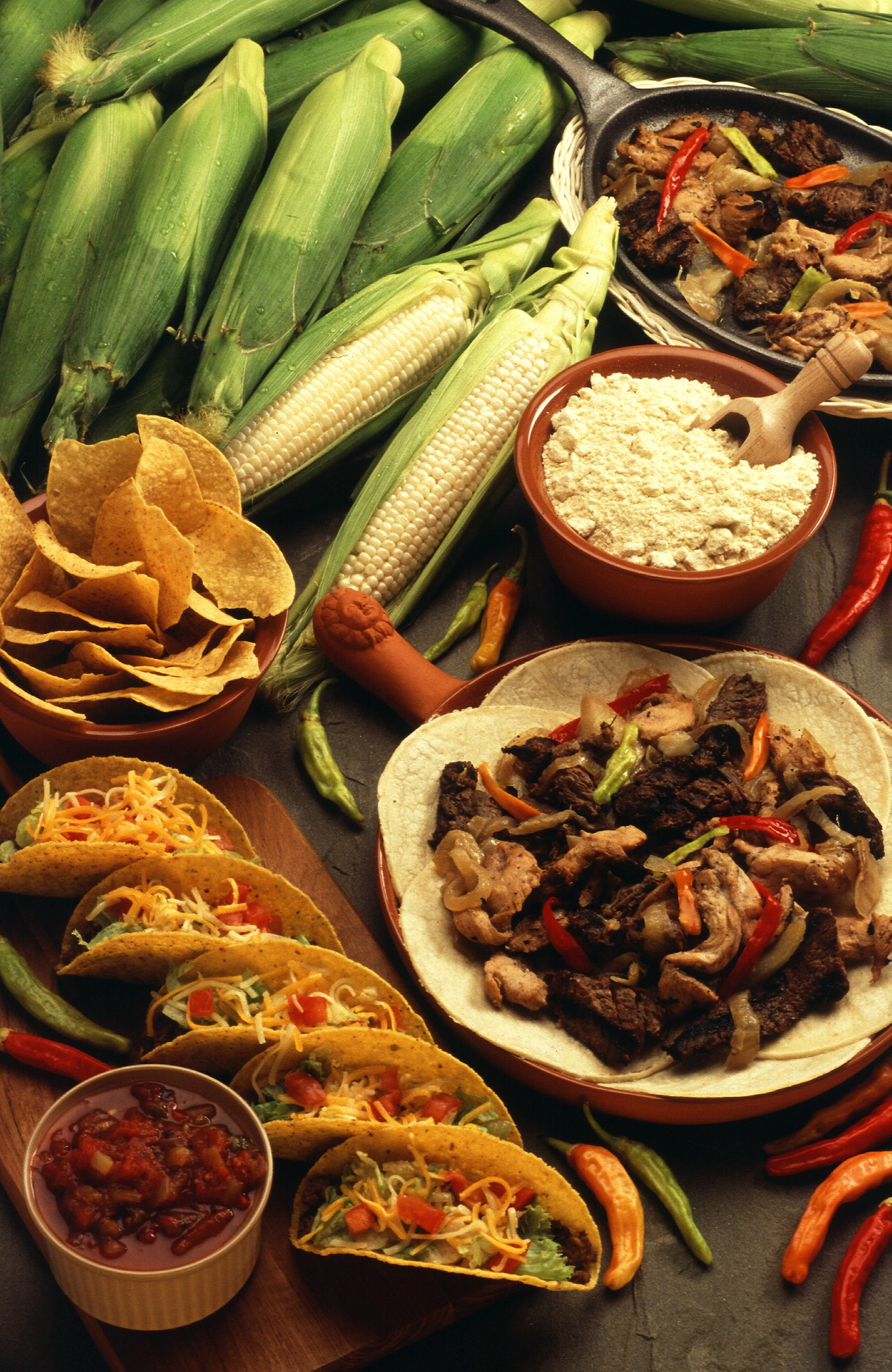
Mexican food has become part of the mainstream American cuisine, as have its offshoots of Tex-Mex and Cal-Mex cuisines.

Hispanic food, particularly Mexican food, has influenced American cuisine and eating habits. Mexican cuisine has become mainstream in American culture. Across the United States, tortillas and salsa are arguably becoming as common as hamburger buns and ketchup. Tortilla chips have surpassed potato chips in annual sales, and plantain chips popular in Caribbean cuisines have continued to increase sales. The avocado has been described as "America's new favorite fruit"; its largest market within the US is among Hispanic Americans.

Due to the large Mexican-American population in the Southwestern United States, and its proximity to Mexico, Mexican food there is believed to be some of the best in the United States. Cubans brought Cuban cuisine to Miami and today, cortaditos, pastelitos de guayaba and empanadas are common mid-day snacks in the city. Cuban culture has changed Miami's coffee drinking habits, and today a café con leche or a cortadito is commonly had at one of the city's numerous coffee shops. The Cuban sandwich, developed in Miami, is now a staple and icon of the city's cuisine and culture.

=== Familial situations ===
==== Family life and values ====
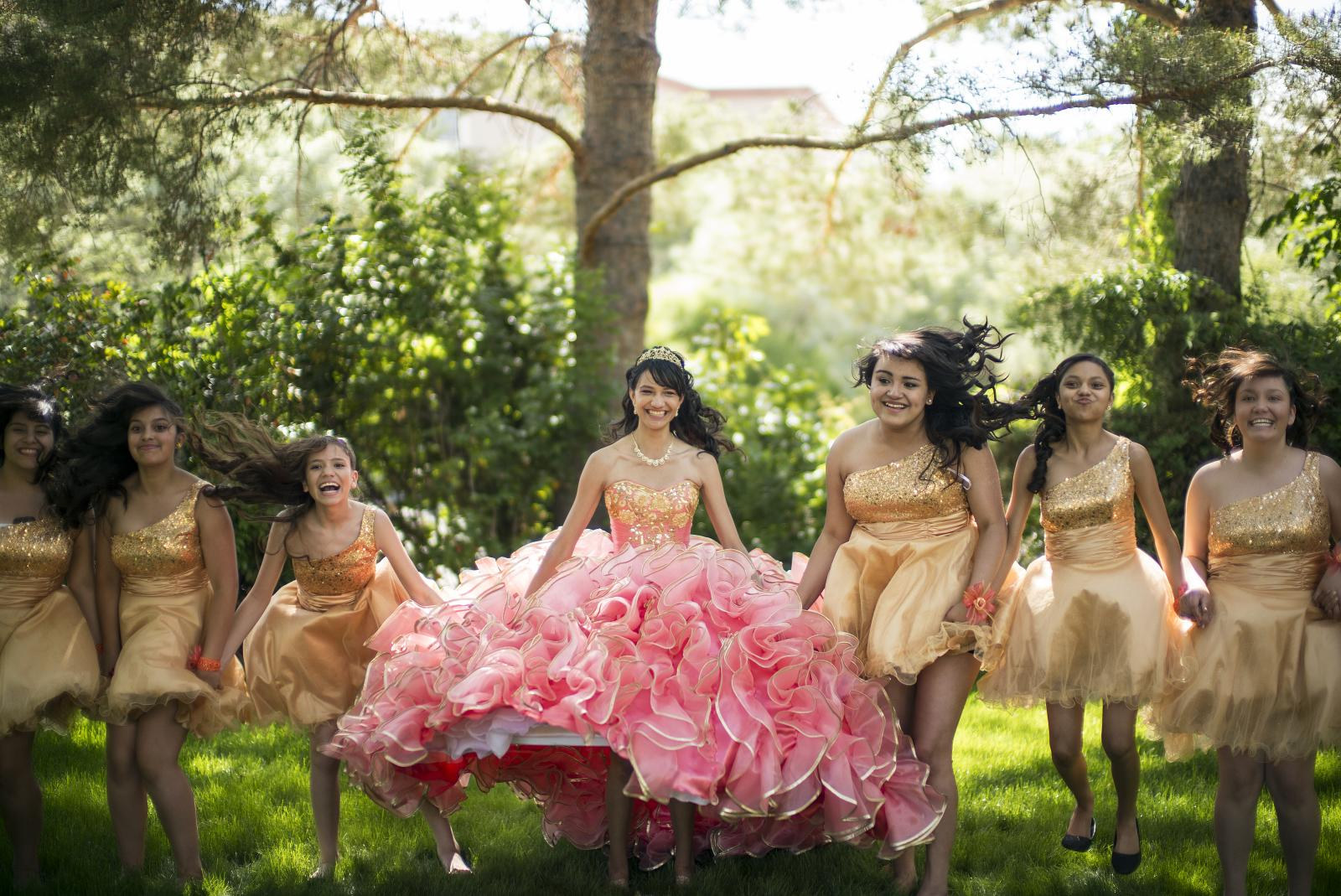
Mexican American girls at a Quinceañera celebration in Santa Fe, New Mexico.

Hispanic culture places a strong value on family and is commonly taught to Hispanic children as one of the most important values in life. Statistically, Hispanic families tend to have larger and closer-knit families than the American average. Hispanic families tend to prefer to live near other family members. This may mean that three or sometimes four generations may be living in the same household or near each other, although four generations is uncommon in the United States. The role of grandparents is believed to be very important in the upbringing of children.

Hispanics tend to be very group-oriented, and an emphasis is placed on the well-being of the family above the individual. The extended family plays an important part of many Hispanic families, and frequent social, family gatherings are common. Traditional rites of passages, particularly Roman Catholic sacraments: such as baptisms, birthdays, first Holy Communions, quinceañeras, Confirmations, graduations and weddings are all popular moments of family gatherings and celebrations in Hispanic families.

Education is another important priority for Hispanic families. Education is seen as the key towards continued upward mobility in the United States among Hispanic families. A 2010 study by the Associated Press showed that Hispanics place a higher emphasis on education than the average American. Hispanics expect their children to graduate university.

Hispanic youth today stay at home with their parents longer than before. This is due to more years spent studying and the difficulty of finding a paid job that meets their aspirations.

==== Intermarriage ====
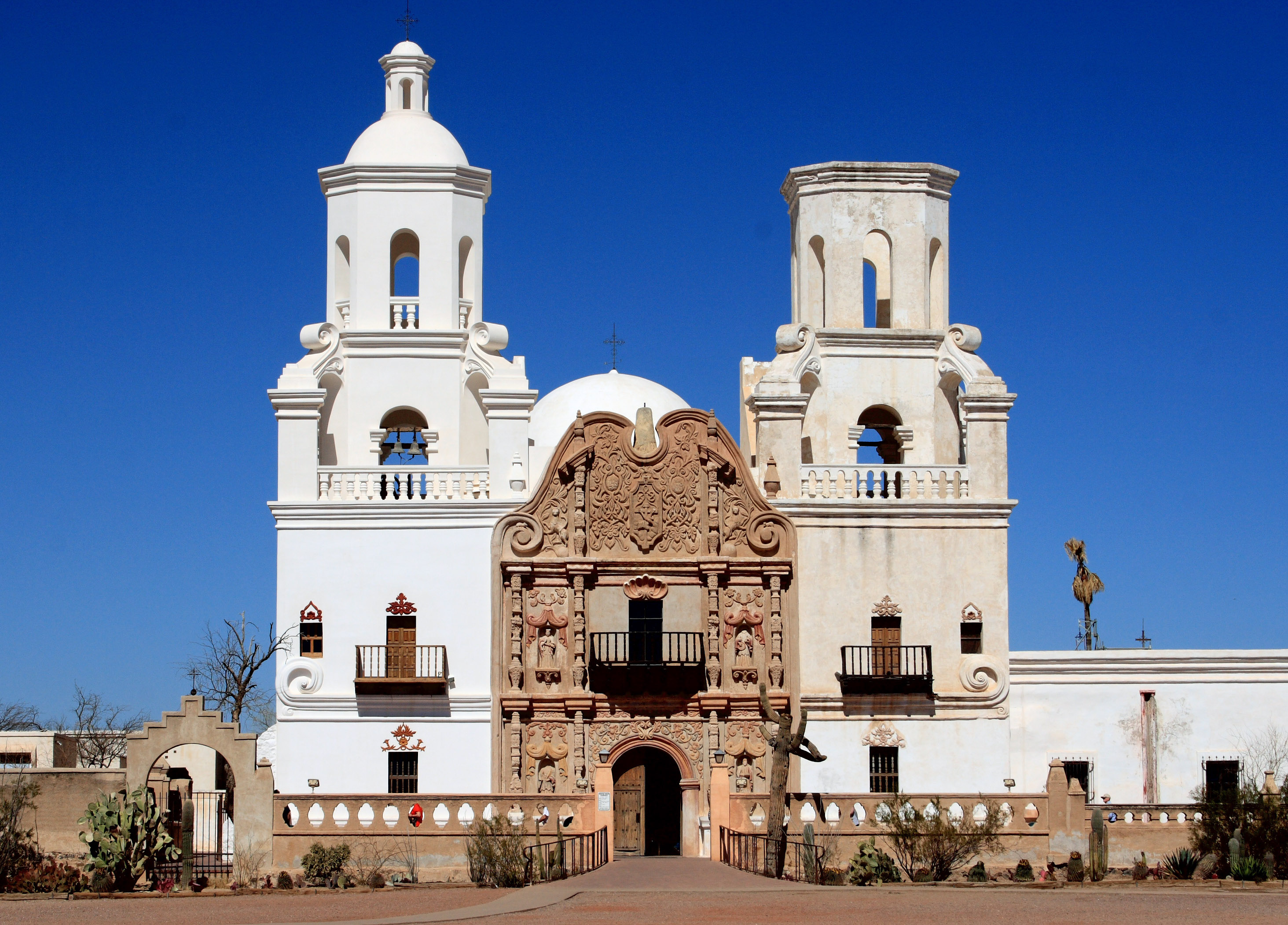
Mission San Xavier del Bac in Tucson, Arizona, was founded in 1692.

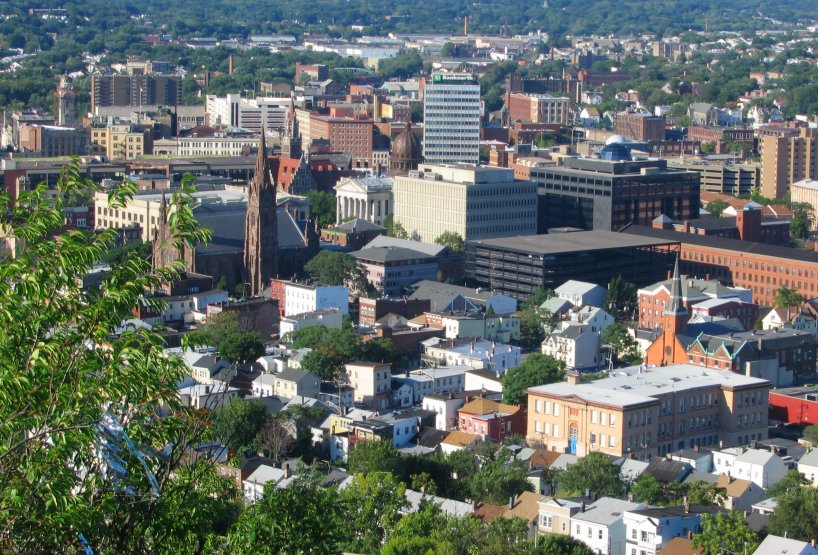
Little Lima in Paterson, New Jersey is home to the largest community of Peruvians outside of South America.

Hispanic Americans, like many immigrant groups before them, are out-marrying at high rates. Out-marriages constituted 17.4% of all existing Hispanic marriages in 2008. The rate was higher for newlyweds (which excludes immigrants who are already married): Among all newlyweds in 2010, 25.7% of all Hispanics married a non-Hispanic (this compares to out-marriage rates of 9.4% of White people, 17.1% of Black people, and 27.7% of Asians). The rate was larger for native-born Hispanics, with 36.2% of native-born Hispanics (both men and women) out-marrying compared to 14.2% of foreign-born Hispanics. The difference is attributed to recent immigrants tending to marry within their immediate immigrant community due to commonality of language, proximity, familial connections, and familiarity.

In 2008, 81% of Hispanics who married out married non-Hispanic White people, 9% married non-Hispanic Black people, 5% non-Hispanic Asians, and the remainder married non-Hispanic, multi-racial partners.

Of approximately 275,500 new interracial or interethnic marriages in 2010, 43.3% were White-Hispanic (compared to White-Asian at 14.4%, White-Black at 11.9%, and other combinations at 30.4%; "other combinations" consists of pairings between different minority groups and multi-racial people). Unlike those for marriage to Black people and Asians, intermarriage rates of Hispanics to White people do not vary by gender. The combined median earnings of White/Hispanic couples are lower than those of White/White couples but higher than those of Hispanic/Hispanic couples. 23% of Hispanic men who married White women have a college degree compared to only 10% of Hispanic men who married a Hispanic woman. 33% of Hispanic women who married a White husband are college-educated compared to 13% of Hispanic women who married a Hispanic man.

Attitudes among non-Hispanics toward intermarriage with Hispanics are mostly favorable, with 81% of White people, 76% of Asians and 73% of Black people "being fine" with a member of their family marrying a Hispanic and an additional 13% of White people, 19% of Asians and 16% of Black people "being bothered but accepting of the marriage". Only 2% of White people, 4% of Asians, and 5% of Black people would not accept a marriage of their family member to a Hispanic.

Hispanic attitudes toward intermarriage with non-Hispanics are likewise favorable, with 81% "being fine" with marriages to White people and 73% "being fine" with marriages to Black people. A further 13% admitted to "being bothered but accepting" of a marriage of a family member to a White and 22% admitted to "being bothered but accepting" of a marriage of a family member to a Black. Only 5% of Hispanics objected outright marriage of a family member to a non-Hispanic Black and 2% to a non-Hispanic White.

Unlike intermarriage with other racial groups, intermarriage with non-Hispanic Black people varies by nationality of origin. Puerto Ricans have by far the highest rates of intermarriage with Black people, of all major Hispanic national groups, who also has the highest overall intermarriage rate among Hispanics. Cubans have the highest rate of intermarriage with non-Hispanic White people, of all major Hispanic national groups, and are the most assimilated into White American culture.

=== Cultural adjustment ===
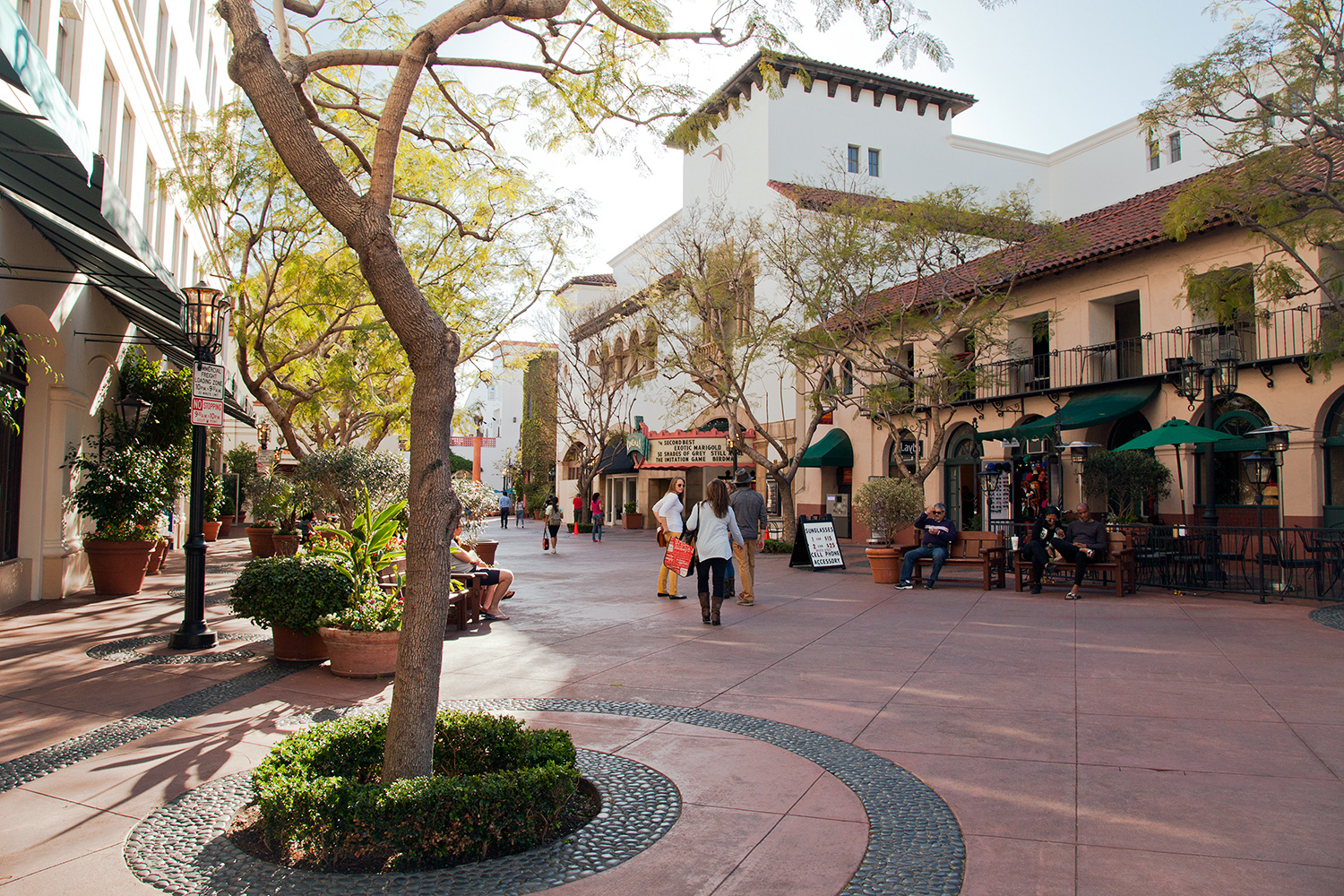
Spanish Revival architecture in Santa Barbara, California.

As Hispanic migrants become the norm in the United States, the effects of this migration on the identity of these migrants and their kin becomes most evident in the younger generations. Crossing the borders changes the identities of both the youth and their families. Often "one must pay special attention to the role expressive culture plays as both entertainment and as a site in which identity is played out, empowered, and reformed" because it is "sometimes in opposition to dominant norms and practices and sometimes in conjunction with them". The exchange of their culture of origin with American culture creates a dichotomy within the values that the youth find important, therefore changing what it means to be Hispanic in the global sphere.

==== Transnationalism ====
Along with feeling that they are neither from the country of their ethnic background nor the United States, a new identity within the United States is formed called latinidad. This is especially seen in cosmopolitan social settings like New York City, Chicago, Houston, Los Angeles and San Francisco. Underway is "the intermeshing of different Latino subpopulations has laid the foundations for the emergence and ongoing evolution of a strong sense of latinidad" which establishes a "sense of cultural affinity and identity deeply rooted in what many Hispanics perceive to be a shared historical, spiritual, aesthetic and linguistic heritage, and a growing sense of cultural affinity and solidarity in the social context of the United States." This unites Hispanics as one, creating cultural kin with other Hispanic ethnicities.

==== Gender roles ====
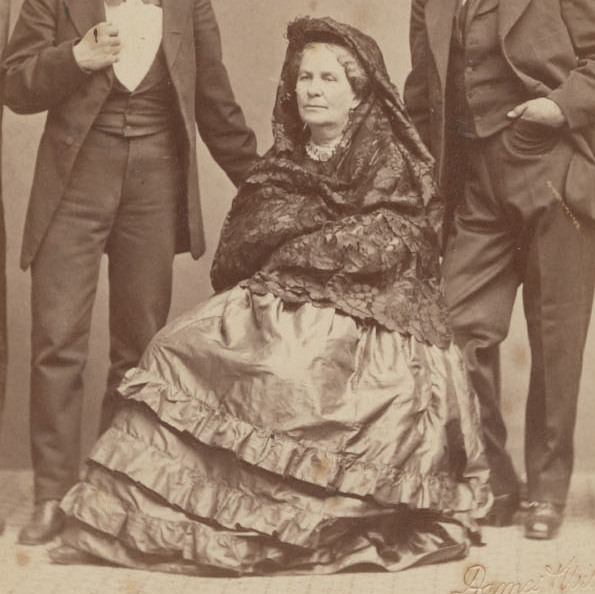
Angustias de la Guerra played a crucial role in defending women's property rights during the drafting of the 1849 Constitution of California.

In a 1998 study of Mexican Americans it was found that males were more likely to endorse the notion than men should be the sole breadwinners of the family, while Mexican American women did not endorse this notion.

Prior to the 1960s countercultural movement, Mexican men often felt an exaggerated need to be the sole breadwinner of their families. There are two sides to machismo, the man who has a strong work ethic and lives up to his responsibilities, or the man who heavily drinks and therefore displays acts of unpleasant behavior towards his family.

The traditional roles of women in a Hispanic community are of housewife and mother, a woman's role is to cook, clean, and care for her children and husband; putting herself and her needs last. The typical structure of a Hispanic family forces women to defer authority to her husband, allowing him to make the important decisions, that both the woman and children must abide by. In traditional Hispanic households, women and young girls are homebodies or muchachas de la casa ("girls of the house"), showing that they abide "by the cultural norms ... [of] respectability, chastity, and family honor [as] valued by the [Hispanic] community".

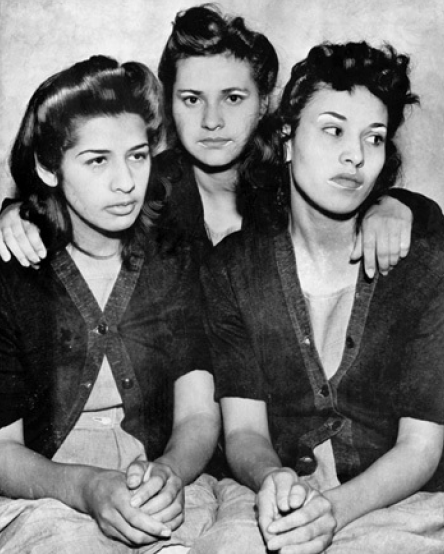
Pachucas were a counter-culture that subverted gender norms and influenced the rise of Chicana feminism.

Migration to the United States can change the identity of Hispanic youth in various ways, including how they carry their gendered identities. However, when Hispanic women come to the United States, they tend to adapt to the perceived social norms of this new country and their social location changes as they become more independent and able to live without the financial support of their families or partners. The unassimilated community views these adapting women as being de la calle ("of [or from] the street"), transgressive, and sexually promiscuous. A women's motive for pursuing an education or career is to prove she can care and make someone of herself, breaking the traditional gender role that a Hispanic woman can only serve as a mother or housewife, thus changing a woman's role in society. Some Hispanic families in the United States "deal with young women's failure to adhere to these culturally prescribed norms of proper gendered behavior in a variety of ways, including sending them to live in ... [the sending country] with family members, regardless of whether or not ... [the young women] are sexually active". Now there has been a rise in the Hispanic community where both men and women are known to work and split the household chores among themselves; women are encouraged to gain an education, degree, and pursue a career.

==== Sexuality ====
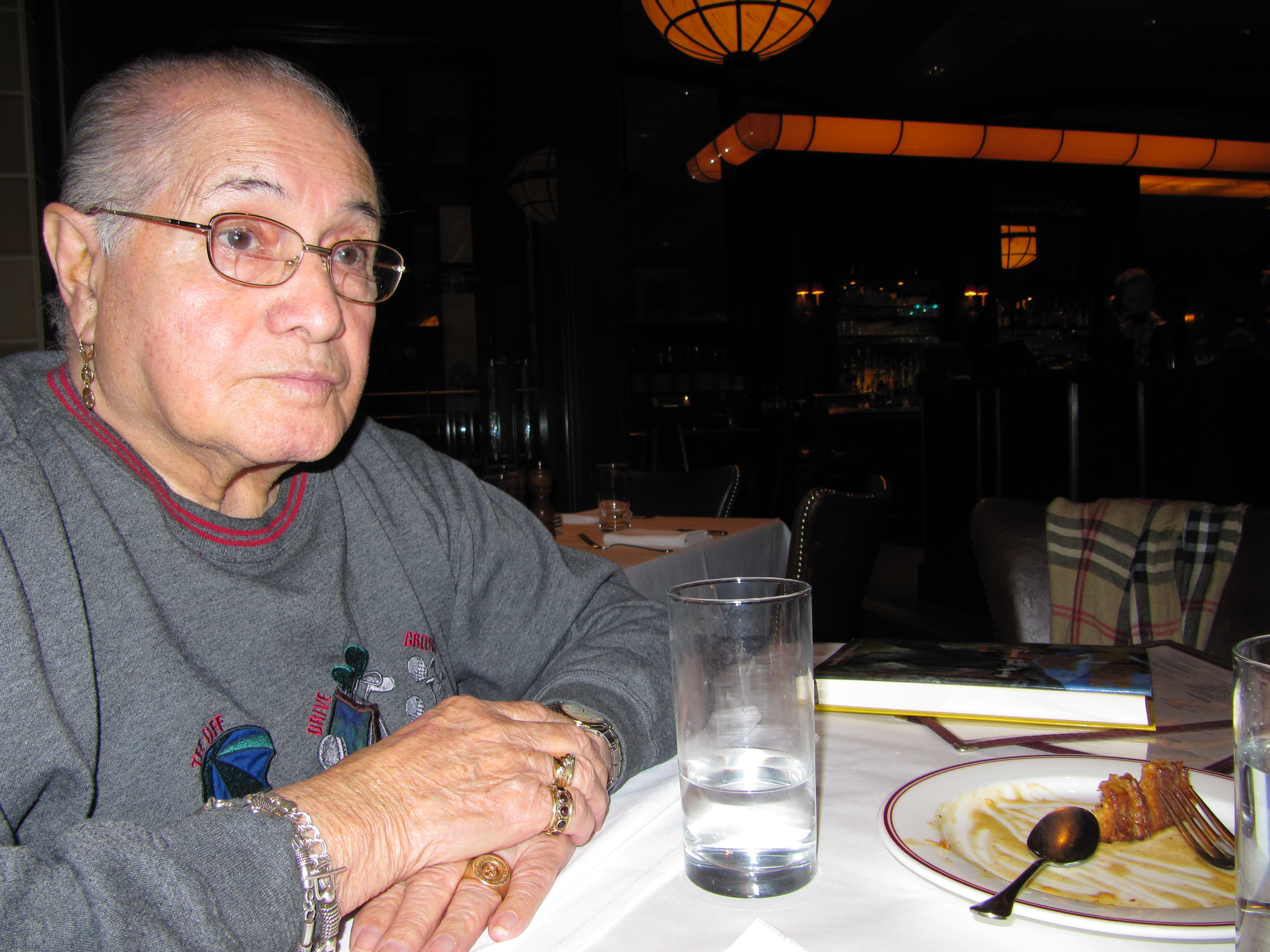
José Sarria became the first openly gay candidate for public office in the United States, when he ran for the San Francisco Board of Supervisors in 1961.

According to polling data released in 2022, 11% of Hispanic American adults identify as gay, lesbian, bisexual or transgender. This is more than twice the rate of White Americans or African Americans. Over 20% of Hispanic Millennials and Gen Z claimed an LGBT identity. The growth of the young Hispanic population is driving an increase of the LGBT community in the United States. Studies have shown that Hispanic Americans are over-represented among transgender people in the United States.

According to Gattamorta, et al. (2018), the socially constructed notion of machismo reinforces male gender roles in Hispanic culture, which can lead to internalized homophobia in Hispanic gay men and increase mental health issues and suicidal ideation. However, according to Reyes Salinas, more recent research shows that there has been an explosive growth of LGBT self-identification among young Hispanic Americans, which may signal that the Hispanic attitudes towards LGBT have broken down. According to Marina Franco, polling conducted in 2022 suggests that the Hispanic community in America is largely accepting of LGBT people and gay marriage, which is significant in light of the rapid growth of LGBT self-identification among Hispanics.

=== Relations with other minority groups ===
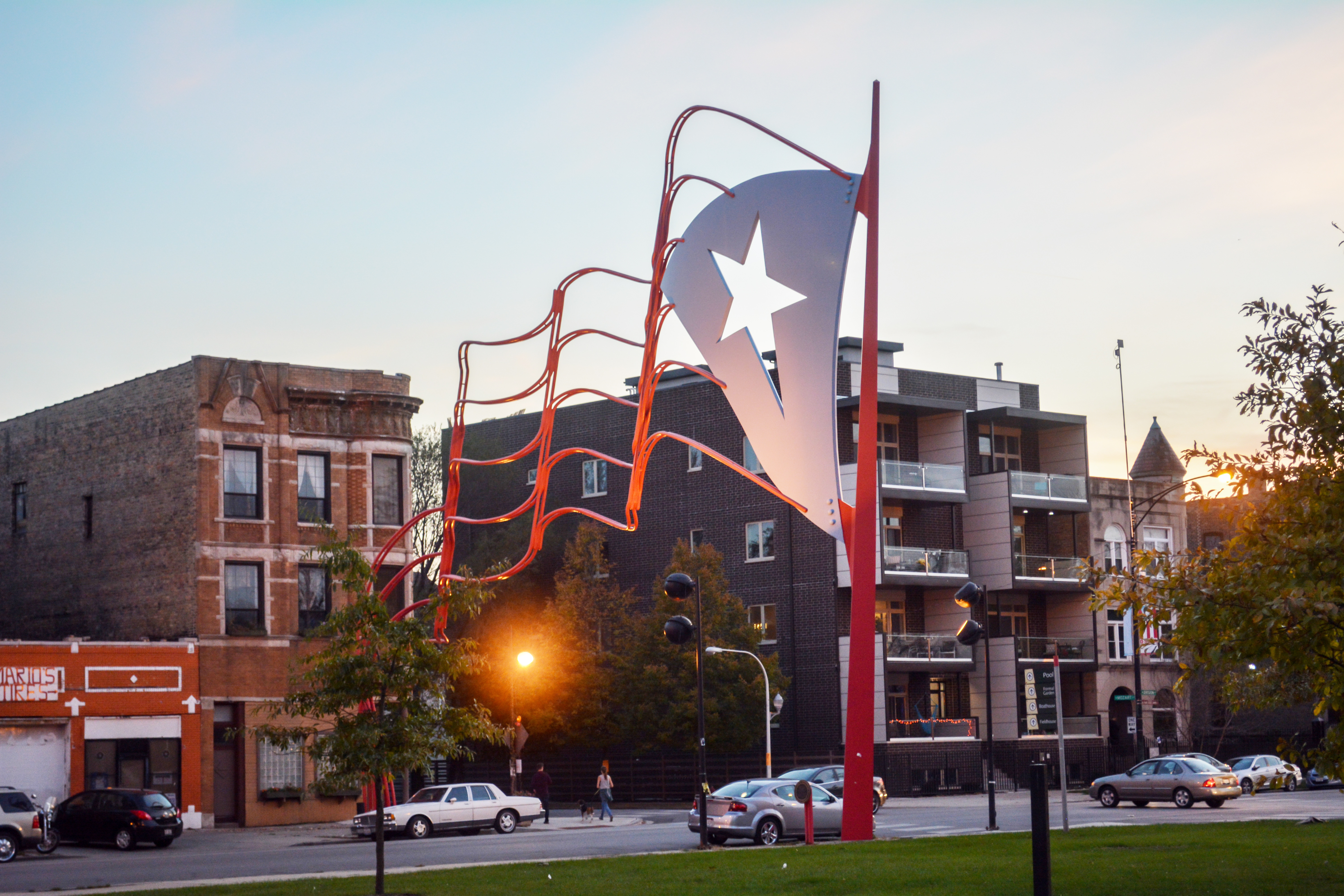
Paseo Boricua in Chicago is a hub for the city's Puerto Rican community.

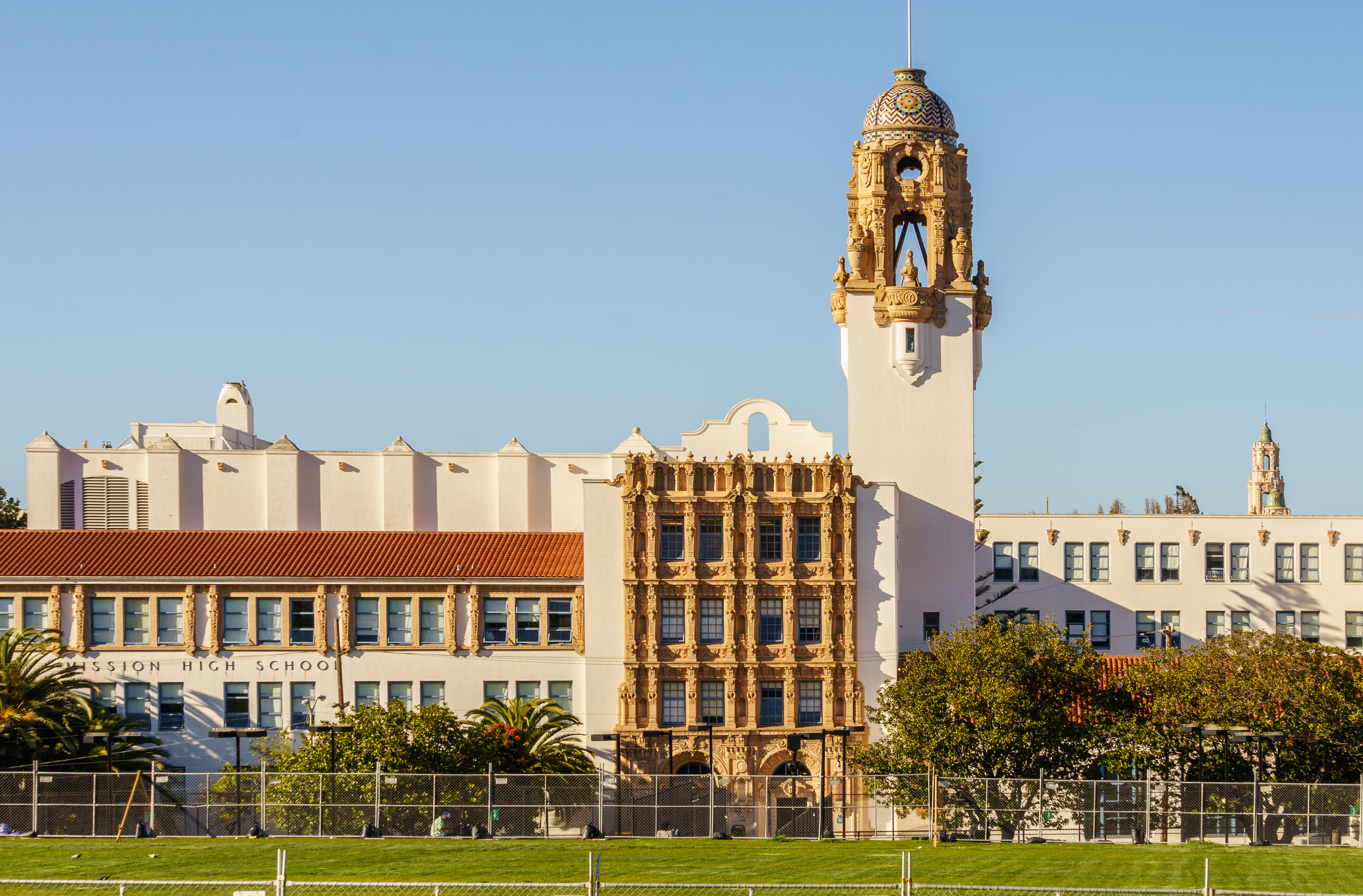
The Mission District in San Francisco is the historic hub for the city's Chicano and Mexican community.

As a result of the rapid growth of the Hispanic population, there has been some tension with other minority populations, especially the African-American population, as Hispanics have increasingly moved into once exclusively Black areas. There has also been increasing cooperation between minority groups to work together to attain political influence.

- A 2007 UCLA study reported that 51% of Black people felt that Hispanics were taking jobs and political power from them and 44% of Hispanics said they feared African-Americans, identifying them with high crime rates. That said, large majorities of Hispanics credited American Black people and the civil rights movement with making life easier for them in the United States.
- A Pew Research Center poll from 2006 showed that Black people overwhelmingly felt that Hispanic immigrants were hard working (78%) and had strong family values (81%); 34% believed that immigrants took jobs from Americans, 22% of Black people believed that they had directly lost a job to an immigrant, and 34% of Black people wanted immigration to be curtailed. The report also surveyed three cities: Chicago (with its well-established Hispanic community); Washington, D.C. (with a less-established but quickly growing Hispanic community); and Raleigh-Durham (with a very new but rapidly growing Hispanic community). The results showed that a significant proportion of Black people in those cities wanted immigration to be curtailed: Chicago (46%), Raleigh-Durham (57%), and Washington, D.C. (48%).
- Per a 2008 University of California, Berkeley Law School research brief, a recurring theme to Black/Hispanic tensions is the growth in "contingent, flexible, or contractor labor", which is increasingly replacing long term steady employment for jobs on the lower-rung of the pay scale (which had been disproportionately filled by Black people). The transition to this employment arrangement corresponds directly with the growth in the Hispanic immigrant population. The perception is that this new labor arrangement has driven down wages, removed benefits, and rendered temporary, jobs that once were stable (but also benefiting consumers who receive lower-cost services) while passing the costs of labor (healthcare and indirectly education) onto the community at large.
- A 2008 Gallup poll indicated that 60% of Hispanics and 67% of Black people believe that good relations exist between US Black people and Hispanics while only 29% of Black people, 36% of Hispanics and 43% of White people, say Black–Hispanic relations are bad.

== Politics ==
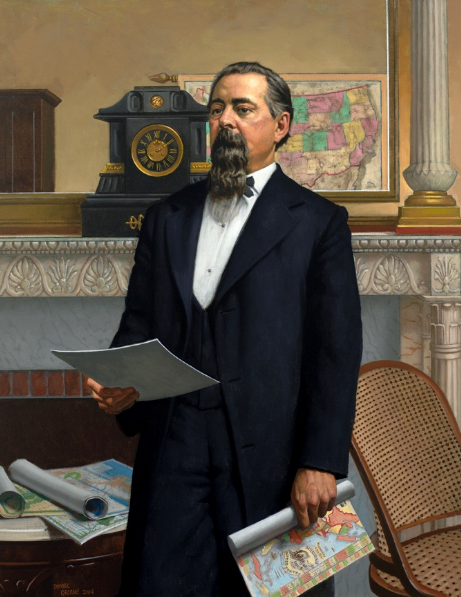
Romualdo Pacheco of California was the first Latino to represent a state in the U.S. Congress (1879–83) and the only Hispanic person to serve as governor of California since the American Conquest of California.

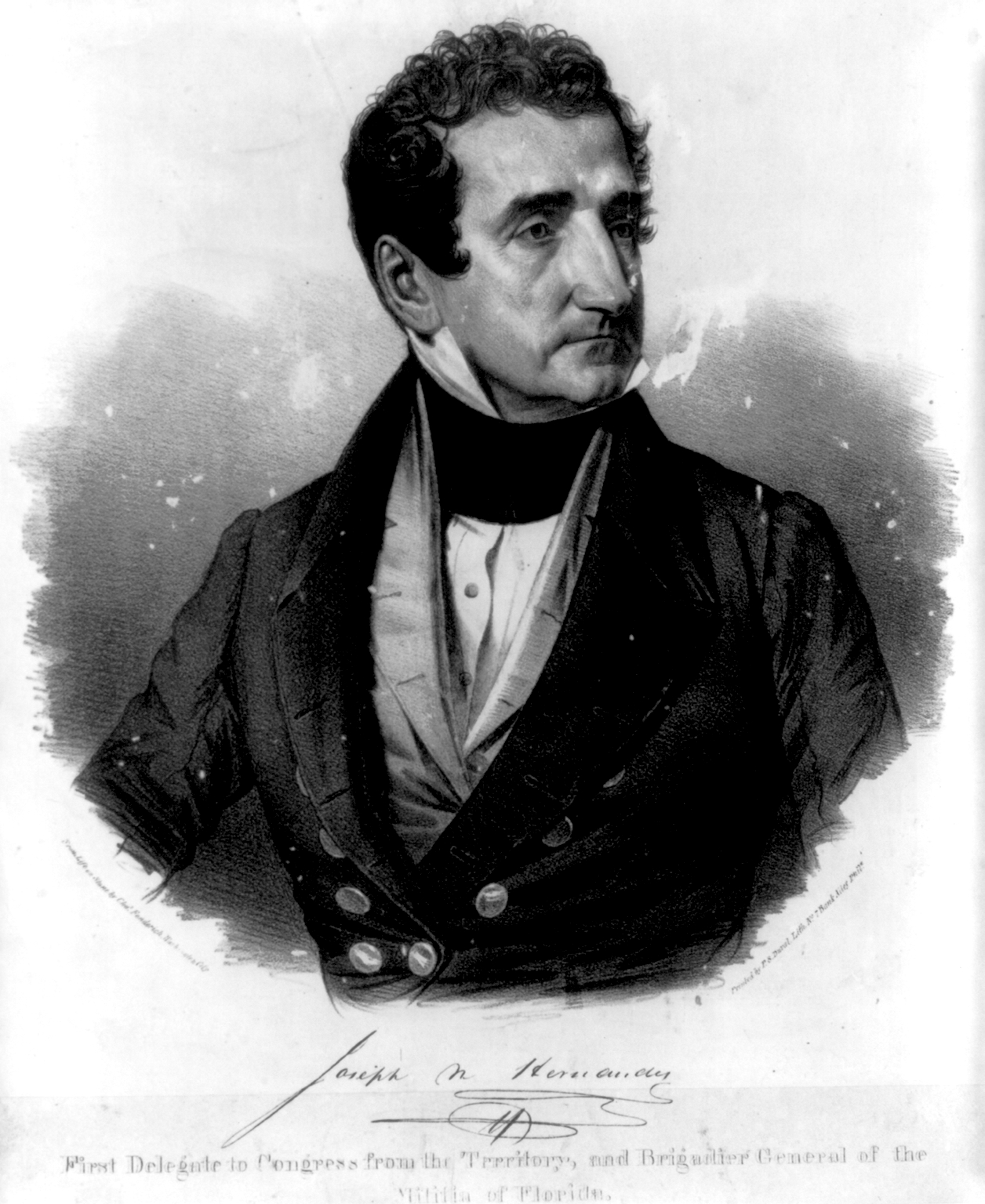
Joseph Marion Hernández of the Florida Territory, elected in 1822, was the first Hispanic American to serve in the United States Congress in any capacity.

=== Political affiliations ===
Hispanics differ on their political views depending on their location and background. The majority (57%) either identify as or support the Democrats, and 23% identify as Republicans. This 34-point gap as of December 2007 was an increase from the gap of 21 points 16 months earlier. While traditionally a key Democratic Party constituency at-large, beginning in the early 2010s, Hispanics have begun to split between the Democrats and the Republican Party. In a 2022 study, it was found that 64% of Latinos surveyed had positive attitudes towards President Obama's executive actions on immigration, which was notably four percentage points lower than that of non-Hispanic Black respondents. It was also noted that support for undocumented immigrants was lowest among Latinos living in developing 'bedroom communities' or newly built suburbs designed for commuters. This was also the case for Latinos of affluent income levels, however they were still most likely to display a positive attitude towards undocumented immigrants, especially when compared to their non-Hispanic White counterparts.

Cuban Americans, Colombian Americans, Chilean Americans, and Venezuelan Americans tend to favor conservative political ideologies and support the Republicans. Mexican Americans, Puerto Ricans, and Dominican Americans tend to favor progressive political ideologies and support the Democrats. However, because the latter groups are far more numerous—as, again, Mexican Americans alone are 64% of Hispanics—the Democratic Party is considered to be in a far stronger position with the ethnic group overall.

Some political organizations associated with Hispanic Americans are League of United Latin American Citizens (LULAC), the National Council of La Raza (NCLR), the United Farm Workers, the Cuban American National Foundation and the National Institute for Latino Policy.

=== Political impact ===
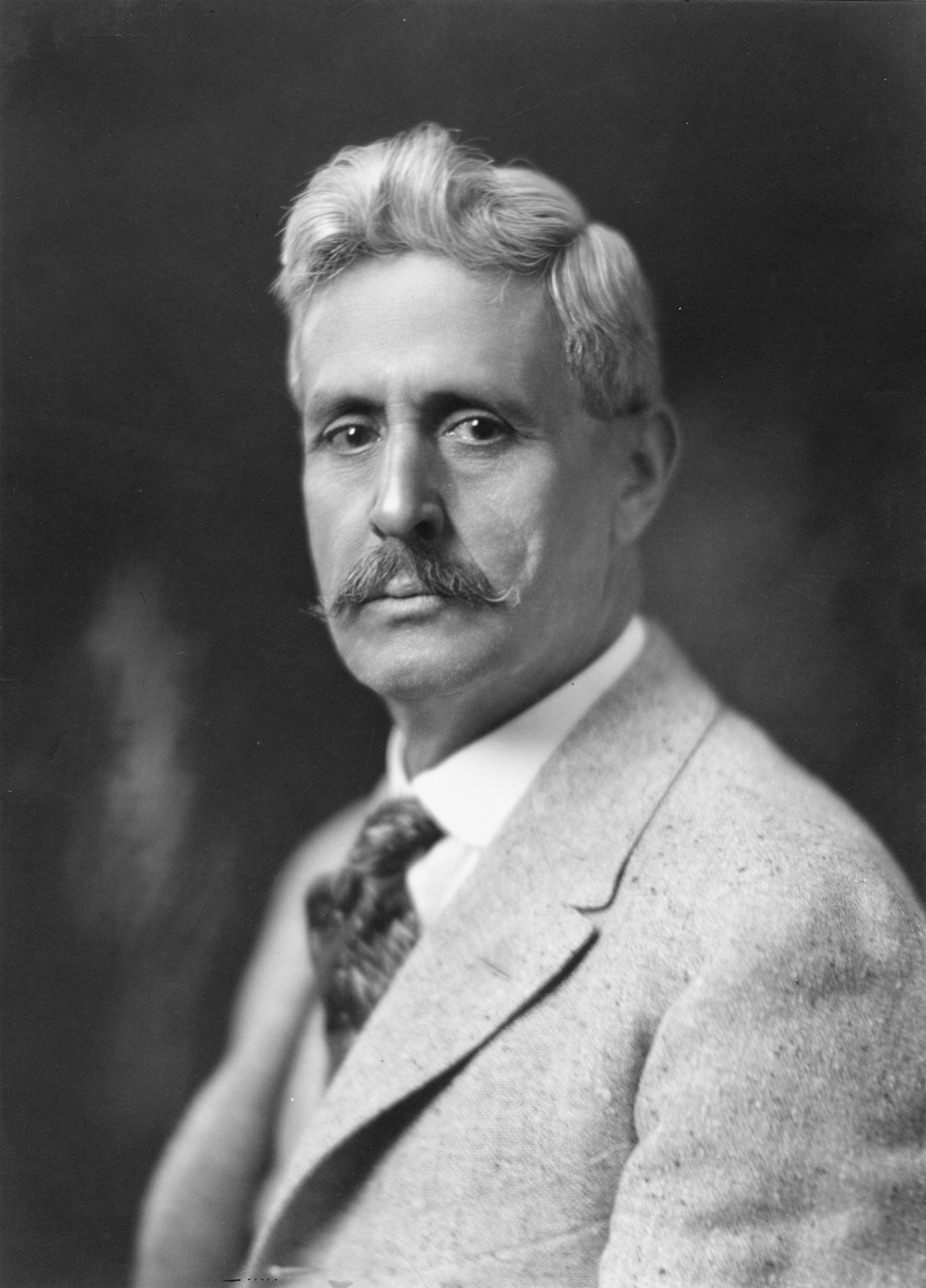
Octaviano Ambrosio Larrazolo of New Mexico was the first Hispanic to serve in the U.S. Senate (1928–29).

The United States has a population of over 60 million of Hispanic Americans, of whom 27 million are citizens eligible to vote (13% of total eligible voters); therefore, Hispanics have a very important effect on presidential elections since the vote difference between two main parties is usually around 4%.

==== Elections of 1996–2006 ====
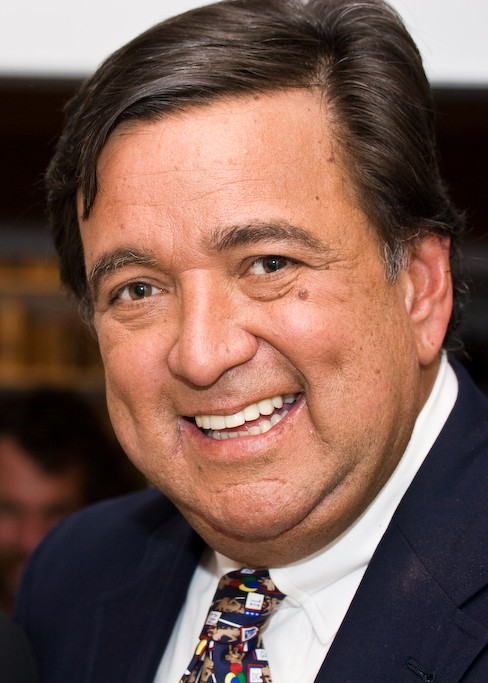
Bill Richardson of New Mexico was the first Hispanic U.S. Ambassador to the United Nations 1997–98).

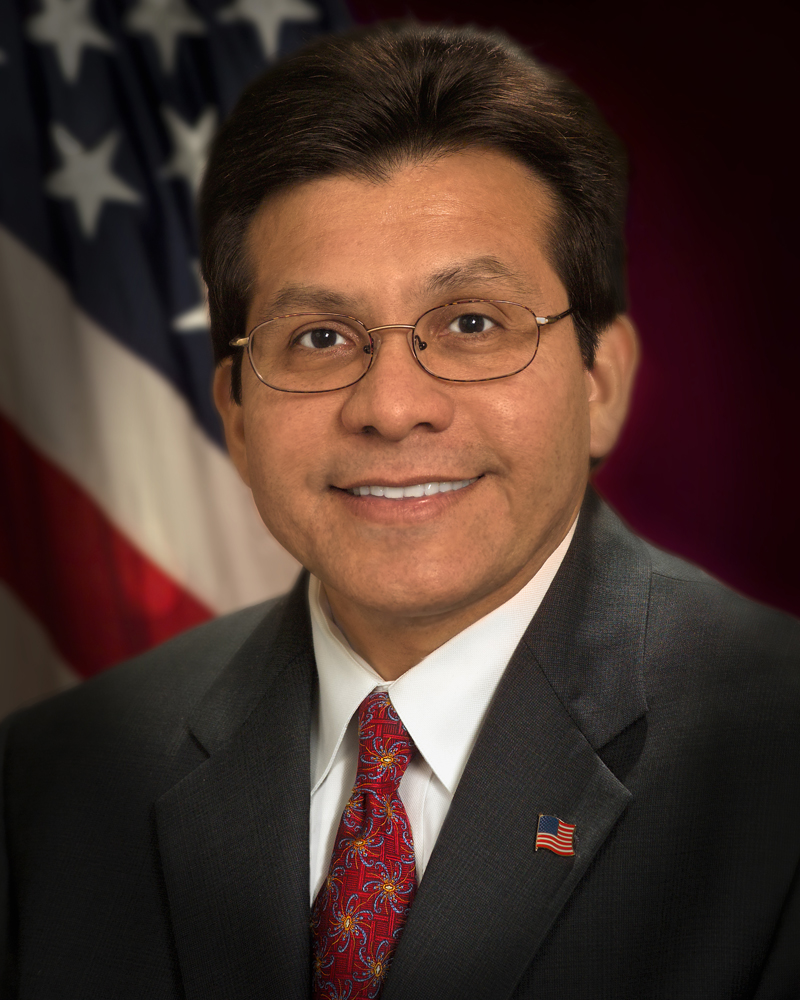
Alberto Gonzales of Texas was the first Hispanic to serve as Attorney General of the United States (2005–07).

In the 1996 presidential election, 72% of Hispanics backed President Bill Clinton. In 2000, the Democratic total fell to 62%, and went down again in 2004, with Democrat John Kerry winning Hispanics 54–44 against Bush. Hispanics in the West, especially in California, were much stronger for the Democratic Party than in Texas and Florida. California Hispanics voted 63–32 for Kerry in 2004, and both Arizona and New Mexico Hispanics by a smaller 56–43 margin. Texas Hispanics were split nearly evenly, favoring Kerry 50–49 over their favorite son candidate and Florida Hispanics (who are mostly Cuban American) backed Bush, by a 54–45 margin.

In the 2006 midterm election, however, due to the unpopularity of the Iraq War, the heated debate concerning illegal Hispanic immigration and Republican-related Congressional scandals, Hispanics went as strongly Democratic as they have since the Clinton years. Exit polls showed the group voting for Democrats by a lopsided 69–30 margin, with Florida Hispanics for the first time split evenly.

The runoff election in Texas' 23rd congressional district was seen as a bellwether of Hispanic politics. Democrat Ciro Rodriguez's unexpected (and unexpectedly decisive) defeat of Republican incumbent Henry Bonilla was seen as proof of a leftward lurch among Hispanic voters; majority-Hispanic counties overwhelmingly backed Rodriguez and majority European-American counties overwhelmingly backed Bonilla.

==== Elections 2008–2012 ====
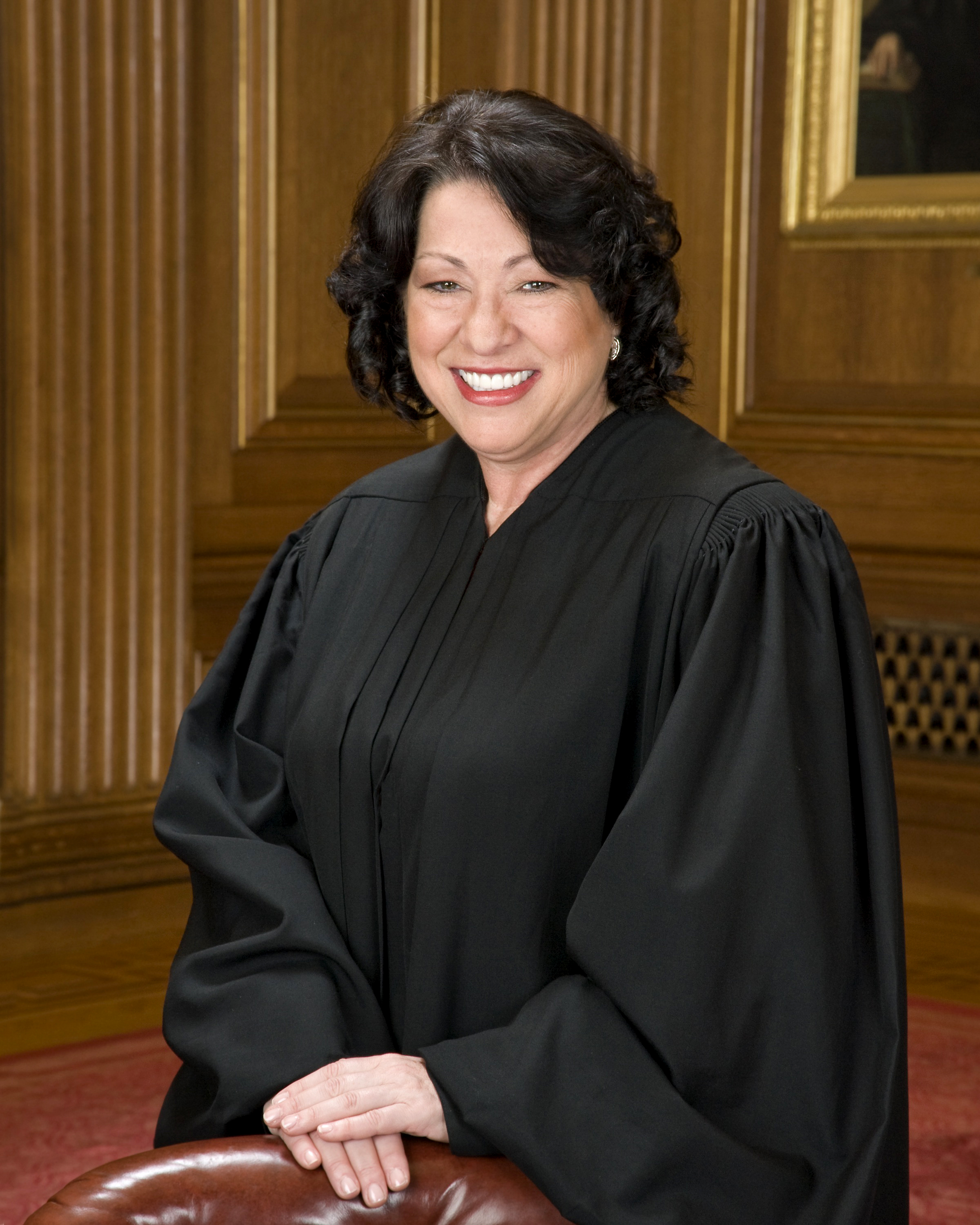
Sonia Sotomayor of New York is the first Hispanic to serve on the Supreme Court of the United States, since 2009.

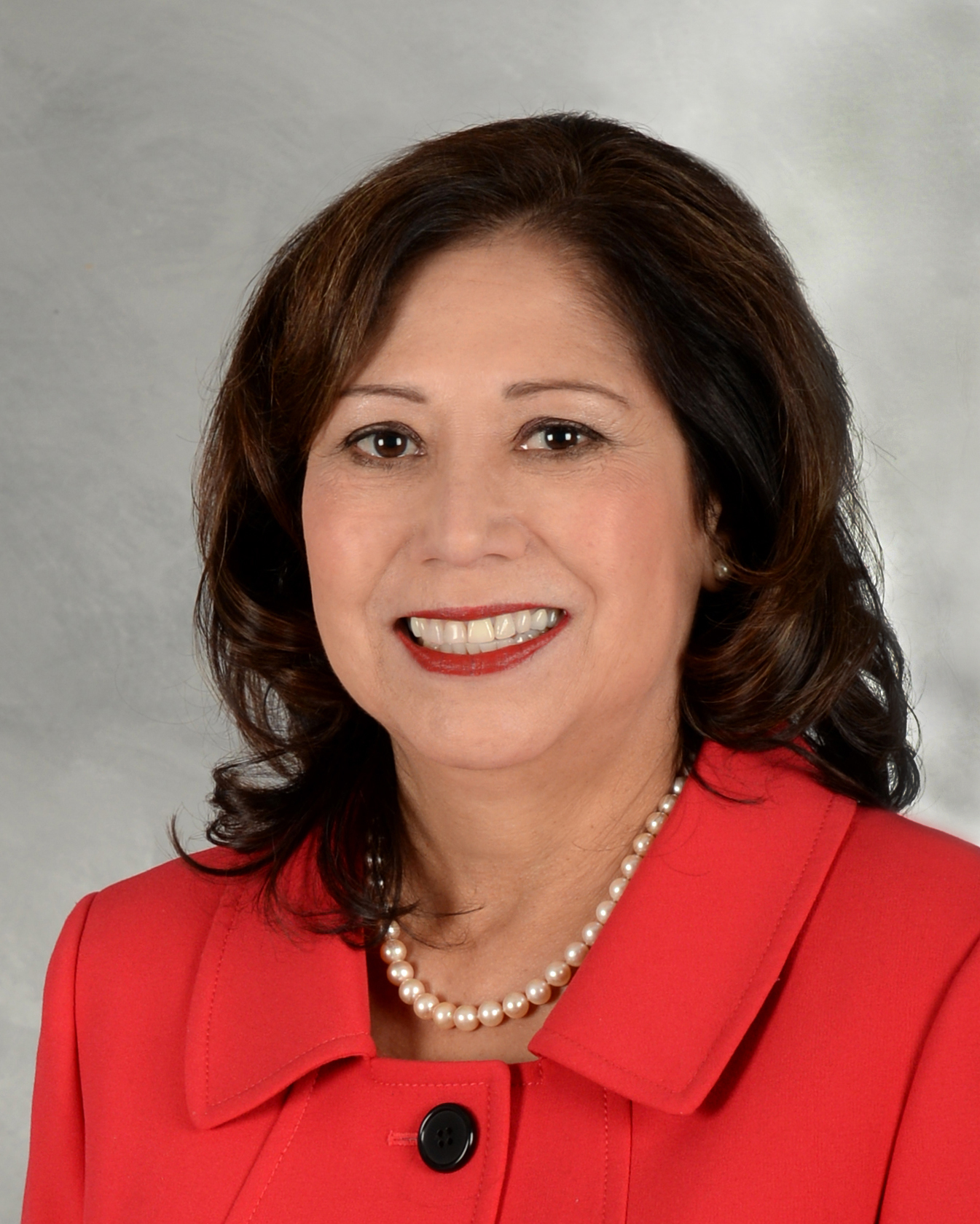
Hilda Solis of California was the first Hispanic woman to serve in the U.S. Cabinet, as Secretary of Labor (2009–13).

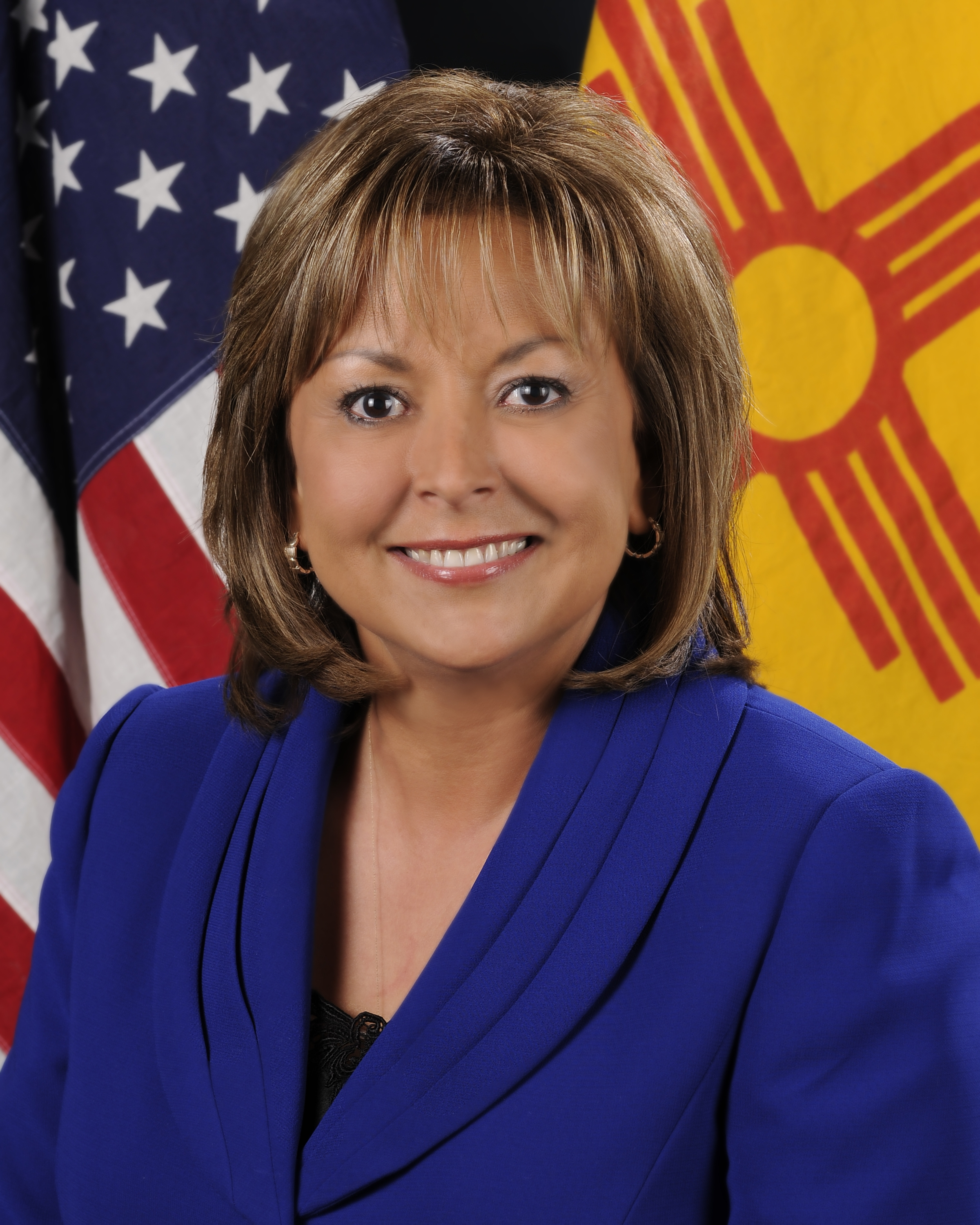
Susana Martinez of New Mexico was the first Hispanic woman to serve as state governor (2011–19).

In the 2008 Presidential election's Democratic primary, Hispanics participated in larger numbers than before, with Hillary Clinton receiving most of the group's support. Pundits discussed whether Hispanics would not vote for Barack Obama because he was African-American. Hispanics voted 2 to 1 for Mrs. Clinton, even among the younger demographic. In other groups, younger voters went overwhelmingly for Obama. Among Hispanics, 28% said race was involved in their decision, as opposed to 13% for (non-Hispanic) White people. Obama defeated Clinton.

In the matchup between Obama and Republican candidate John McCain, Hispanics supported Obama with 59% to McCain's 29% in the June 30 Gallup tracking poll. This was higher than expected, since McCain had been a leader of the comprehensive immigration reform effort (John McCain was born in Panama to parents who were serving in the US Navy, but raised in the United States). However, McCain had retreated from reform during the Republican primary, damaging his standing among Hispanics. Obama took advantage of the situation by running ads in Spanish highlighting McCain's reversal.

In the general election, 67% of Hispanics voted for Obama. with a relatively strong turnout in states such as Colorado, New Mexico, Nevada and Virginia, helping Obama carry those formerly Republican states. Obama won 70% of non-Cuban Hispanics and 35% of the traditionally Republican Cuban Americans who have a strong presence in Florida. The relative growth of non-Cuban vs Cuban Hispanics also contributed to his carrying Florida's Hispanics with 57% of the vote.

While employment and the economy were top concerns for Hispanics, almost 90% of Hispanic voters rated immigration as "somewhat important" or "very important" in a poll taken after the election. Republican opposition to the Comprehensive Immigration Reform Act of 2007 had damaged the party's appeal to Hispanics, especially in swing states such as Florida, Nevada and New Mexico. In a Gallup poll of Hispanic voters taken in the final days of June 2008, only 18% of participants identified as Republicans.

Hispanics voted even more heavily for Democrats in the 2012 election with the Democratic incumbent Barack Obama receiving 71% and the Republican challenger Mitt Romney receiving about 27% of the vote. Some Hispanic leaders were offended by remarks Romney made during a fundraiser, when he suggested that cultural differences and "the hand of providence" help explain why Israelis are more economically successful than Palestinians, and why similar economic disparities exist between other neighbors, such as the United States and Mexico, or Chile and Ecuador. A senior aide to Palestinian Authority President Mahmoud Abbas called the remarks racist, as did American political scientist Angelo Falcón, president of the National Institute of Latino Policy. Mitt Romney's father was born to American parents in a Mormon colony in Chihuahua, Mexico.

==== Elections 2014–2022 ====
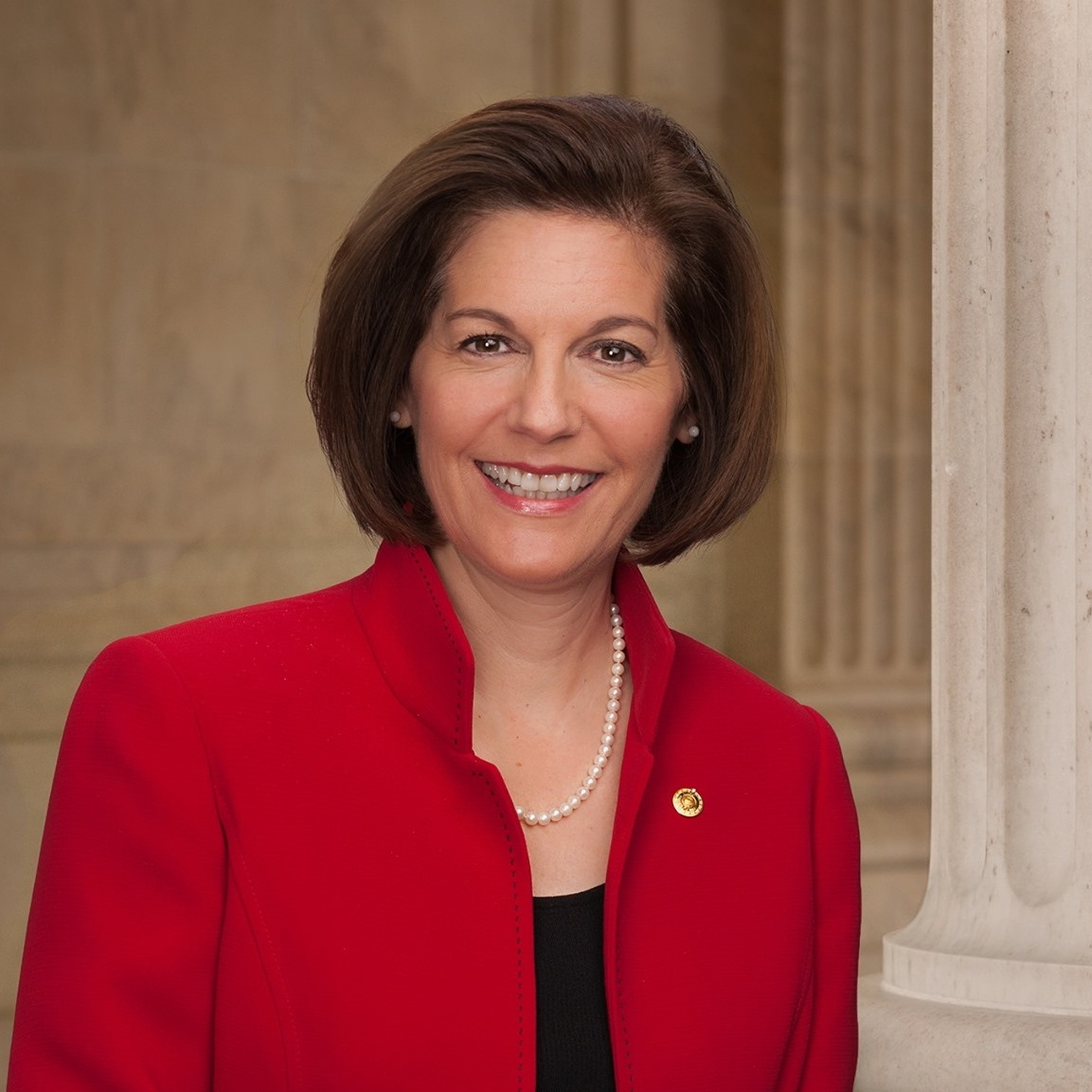
Catherine Cortez Masto of Nevada is the first Hispanic woman to serve in the U.S. Senate, since 2017.

"More convincing data" from the 2016 United States presidential election from the polling firm Latino Decisions indicates that Clinton received a higher share of the Hispanic vote, and Trump a lower share, than the Edison exit polls showed. Using wider, more geographically and linguistically representative sampling, Latino Decisions concluded that Clinton won 79% of Hispanic voters (also an improvement over Obama's share in 2008 and 2012), while Trump won only 18% (lower than previous Republicans such as Romney and McCain). Additionally, the 2016 Cooperative Congressional Election Study found that Clinton's share of the Hispanic vote was one percentage point higher than Obama's in 2012, while Trump's was seven percentage points lower than Romney's.

On June 26, 2018, Alexandria Ocasio-Cortez, a millennial, won the Democratic primary in New York's 14th congressional district covering parts of The Bronx and Queens in New York City, defeating the incumbent, Democratic Caucus Chair Joe Crowley, in what has been described as the biggest upset victory in the 2018 midterm election season and at the age of 29 years, became the youngest woman ever elected to Congress. She is a member of the Democratic Socialists of America and has been endorsed by various politically progressive organizations and individuals. According to a Pew Research Center report, the 2020 election will be the first one when Hispanics are the largest racial or ethnic minority group in the electorate. A record 32 million Hispanics were projected to be eligible to vote in the presidential election, many of them first-time voters. On September 15, 2020, President Donald Trump announced his intent to nominate and appoint Eduardo Verastegui, to be a member of the President's Advisory Commission on Hispanic Prosperity if re-elected after days of the Democratic convention.

Hispanic communities across the United States were long held as a single voting bloc, but economic, geographic and cultural differences show stark divides in how Hispanic Americans have cast their ballots in 2020. Hispanics helped deliver Florida to Donald Trump in part because of Cuban Americans and Venezuelan Americans (along with smaller populations such as Nicaraguan Americans and Chilean Americans); President Trump's reelection campaign ran pushing a strong anti-socialism message as a strategy in Florida, to their success. However the perceived anti-immigrant rhetoric resonated with Mexican Americans in Arizona and the COVID-19 pandemic (Arizona being one of the states hardest hit by the COVID-19 pandemic in the United States). Many Latino voters in Nevada are members of the Culinary Union Local 226 and supported Biden based on Right-to-work standards. The takeaway may be this may be the last election cycle that the "Hispanic vote" as a whole is more talked about instead of particular communities within it, such as Cubans, Puerto Ricans, Mexican Americans and so on. In Texas like in Arizona and Nevada, the Hispanic community mainly being Mexican American; one in three Texan voters is now Hispanic. Biden did win the Hispanic vote in those states. But in Texas, 41 percent to 47 percent of Hispanic voters backed Trump in several heavily Hispanic border counties in the Rio Grande Valley region, a Democratic stronghold. In Florida, Trump won 45 percent of the Hispanic vote, an 11-point improvement from his 2016 performance reported NBC News. Recognizing Hispanics as a population that can not only make a difference in swing states like Arizona, Nevada, Texas or Florida, but also really across the country, even in places like Georgia, North Carolina, Wisconsin, Michigan and Pennsylvania, the number of Hispanic eligible voters may be the reason for the thin margins. In 1984, 37 percent of Hispanics voted for Ronald Reagan and 40 percent voted for George W. Bush in 2004.

In Florida, even though Trump won Florida and gained Hispanic voters, Biden kept 53% of the Hispanic vote and Trump 45%. According to NBC News exit polls, 55% of Cuban Americans, 30% of Puerto Ricans and 48% of other Hispanics voted for Trump.

Subsections of Hispanic voters have a range of historical influences vying to affect their votes. Cuban American voters, mostly concentrated in South Florida, tend to vote Republican in part because of their anathema for socialism, the party of Fidel Castro's government that many of their families fled. Mexican Americans, however, have no such historical relationship with either party. Puerto Rican voters who have left the island might be influenced by the territory's move towards statehood, as a referendum for Trump's relief effort after Hurricane Maria, or regarding how it is taxed.

Nationwide, Hispanics cast 16.6 million votes in 2020, an increase of 30.9% over the 2016 presidential election.

After representative Filemon Vela Jr. resigned, Mayra Flores won a special election to succeed him, she won the election to the United States House of Representatives in June 2022. She was the first Mexican-born woman to serve in the House, but would go on to lose in the 2022 General election to Democrat Vicente Gonzalez.

==== Elections 2024–Present ====
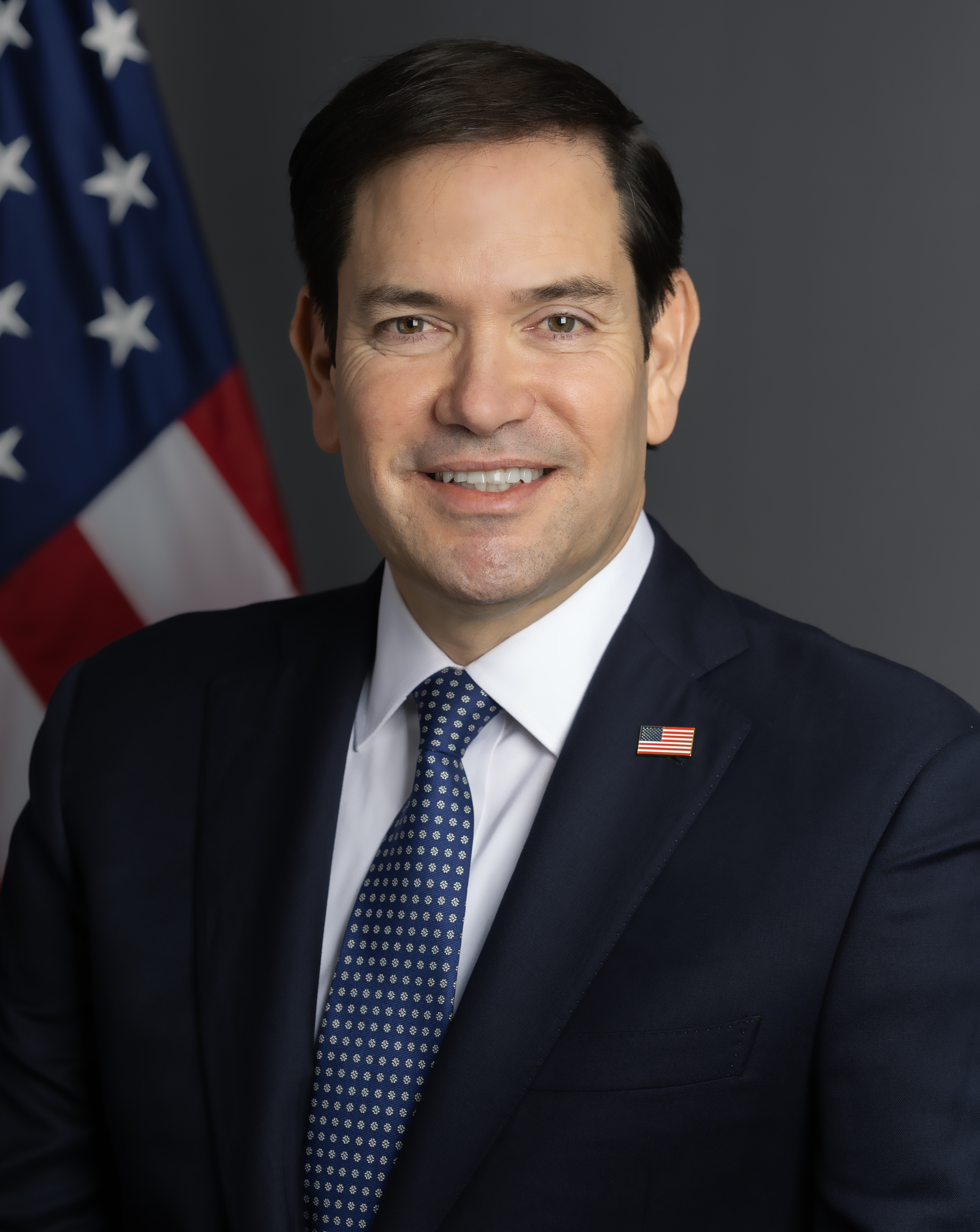
Marco Rubio of Florida is the first Latino to serve as Secretary of State and the highest-ranking Hispanic official in U.S. history.

Hispanic voters in the United States have traditionally leaned toward the Democratic Party, but recent elections reveal a significant shift toward the Republican Party, particularly in key battleground states. In the 2024 election, Republican candidate Donald Trump garnered over 46% of the Hispanic vote, surpassing the 44% support that George W. Bush received in 2004. This shift continues a trend that began in 2020, when Trump made notable inroads among Latino voters, especially in states like Florida and Texas, where Hispanic voters played a crucial role in his victories. Trump's support among Hispanic men has grown particularly strong, with 55% of Latino men voting for him in 2024, a significant increase from 2020. In Central California, a region with a sizable Latino population, there is also a noticeable trend toward the Republican Party. This trend allowed Trump to flip several Hispanic Counties, rural ones such as Starr and Imperial, and urban ones such as Riverside and Miami. Many Latino voters in this area feel neglected by the Democrats and increasingly courted by Republicans.

While the majority of Hispanic voters still align with the Democratic Party, the growing rightward shift is increasingly evident among certain demographic groups. Economic concerns—such as inflation, healthcare costs, and housing affordability—have become more central to many Latino voters, especially older generations, rather than the social issues like immigration or reproductive rights that were focal points in Democratic campaigns.

The COVID-19 pandemic caused a temporary decline in immigration to the U.S., but as restrictions have eased, immigration has surged, particularly from Latin America and parts of Asia. Currently, Chinese, Indians, and Filipinos are the three largest Asian ethnic groups immigrating to the United States. Asians in the U.S. are a highly diverse group that is growing fast. Asian immigrants constitute 6% of the United States population and are estimated to rise to 10% by 2050. In 2023, border encounters reached record highs, driven by a combination of economic instability, violence, and natural disasters in countries like Venezuela, Honduras, and El Salvador. Additionally, the U.S. has seen an influx of refugees from conflict-ridden regions, including Afghanistan, Syria, and Ukraine, as ongoing wars and political instability continue to displace millions. Additionally, ideological factors played a significant role, particularly among Cuban and Puerto Rican communities, in response to the backlash following a comedian's offensive remark at a Trump rally, where Puerto Rico was described as an "island of garbage".

Despite these gains for the GOP, the Democratic Party retains a substantial advantage, particularly among younger, urban, and more progressive Hispanic voters. As Professor Carl Tobias of the University of Richmond noted, Trump's hardline stance on immigration resonated more with some Latino voters than the approach advocated by Vice President Kamala Harris. This trend was especially evident in areas along the Mexican-American border and communities affected by recent immigration patterns. In the 2025 election, the Democratic Party regained support from Hispanic voters, as some expressed frustration during and after the 2024 election with Trump's handling of the economy and ICE's aggressive deportations under his administration.

== Notable contributions ==
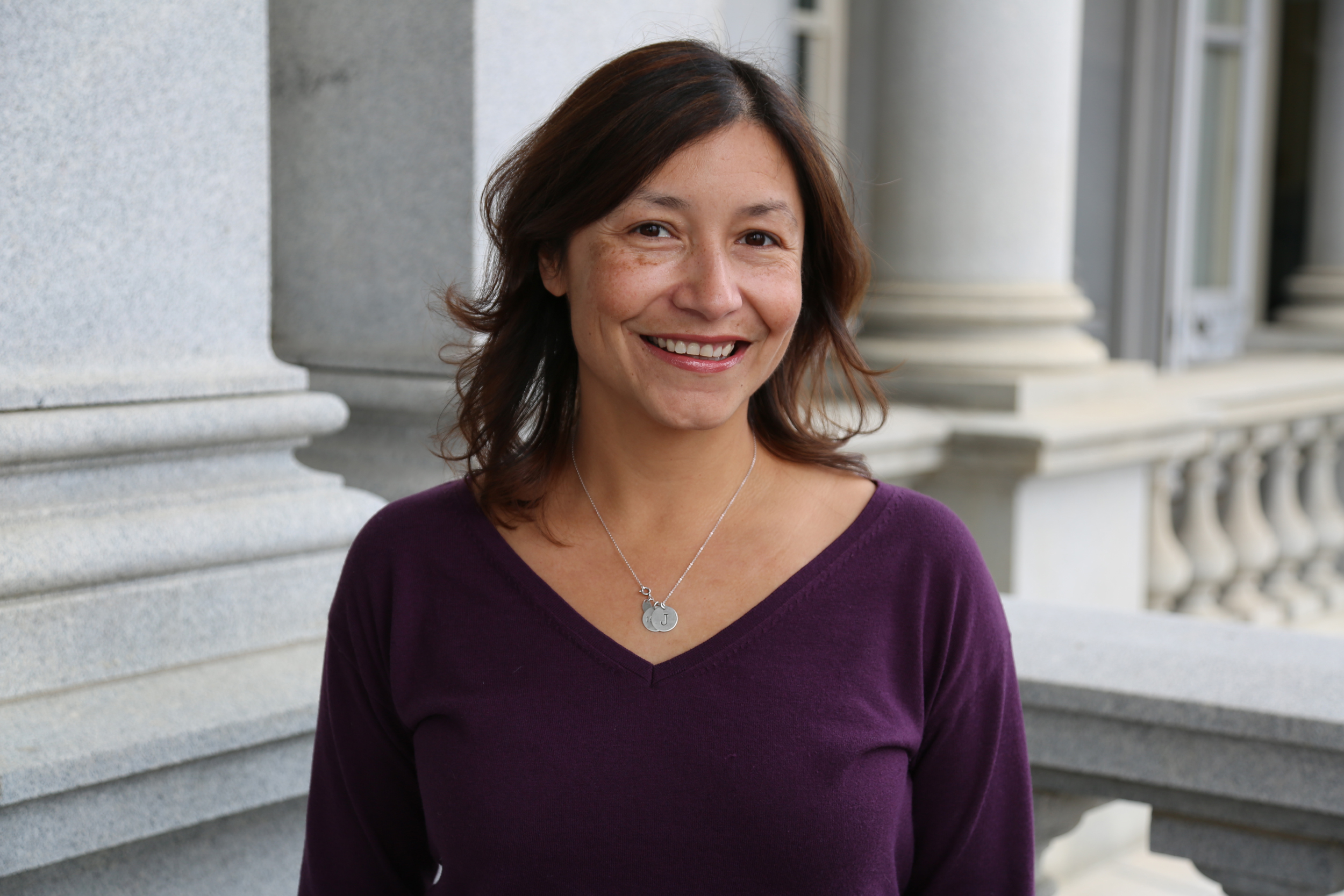
Julie Chavez Rodriguez the granddaughter of American labor leader, Cesar Chavez and American labor activist Helen Fabela Chávez became the director of the White House Office of Intergovernmental Affairs in 2021.

Hispanic Americans have made distinguished contributions to the United States in all major fields, such as politics, the military, music, film, literature, sports, business and finance, and science.

=== Arts and entertainment ===
In 1995, the American Latino Media Arts Award, or ALMA Award was created. It is a distinction given to Hispanic performers (actors, film and television directors and musicians) by the National Council of La Raza. The number of Latin nominees at the Grammy Awards lag behind. Talking to People magazine ahead of music's biggest night in 2021, Grammy nominees J Balvin and Ricky Martin reflected on what it is mean to continue to represent Hispanics at awards shows like the Grammys. Martin, who served as a pioneer for the "Latin crossover" in the '90s told "When you get nominated, it's the industry telling you, 'Hey Rick, you did a good job this year, congratulations.' Yes, I need that", the 49-year-old says. "When you walk into the studio, you say, 'This got a Grammy potential.' You hear the songs that do and the ones that don't. It's inevitable." Like Selena Gomez tapping into her roots, the influence Hispanics and reggaetón are having on the mainstream is undeniable.

==== Music ====
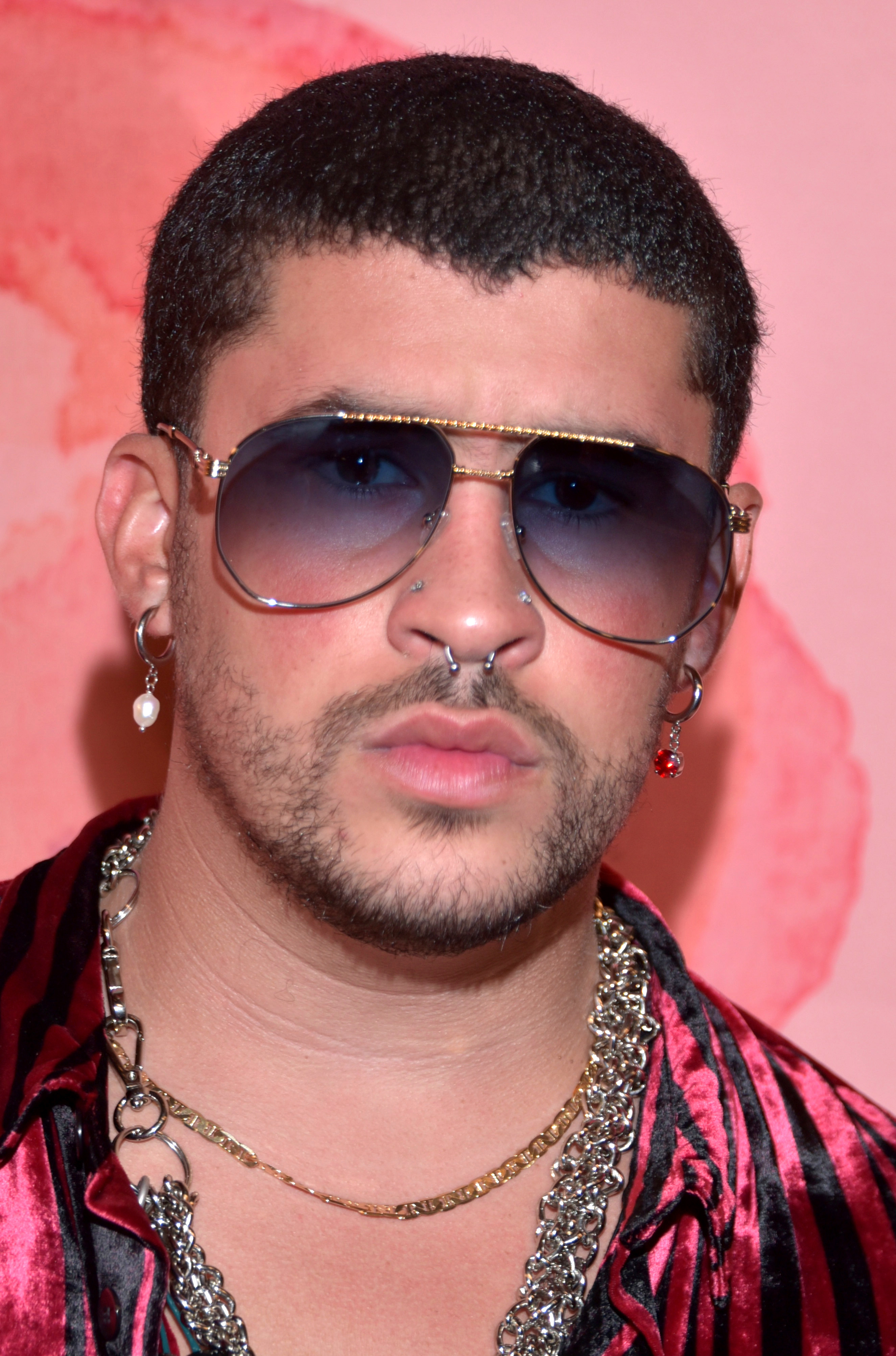
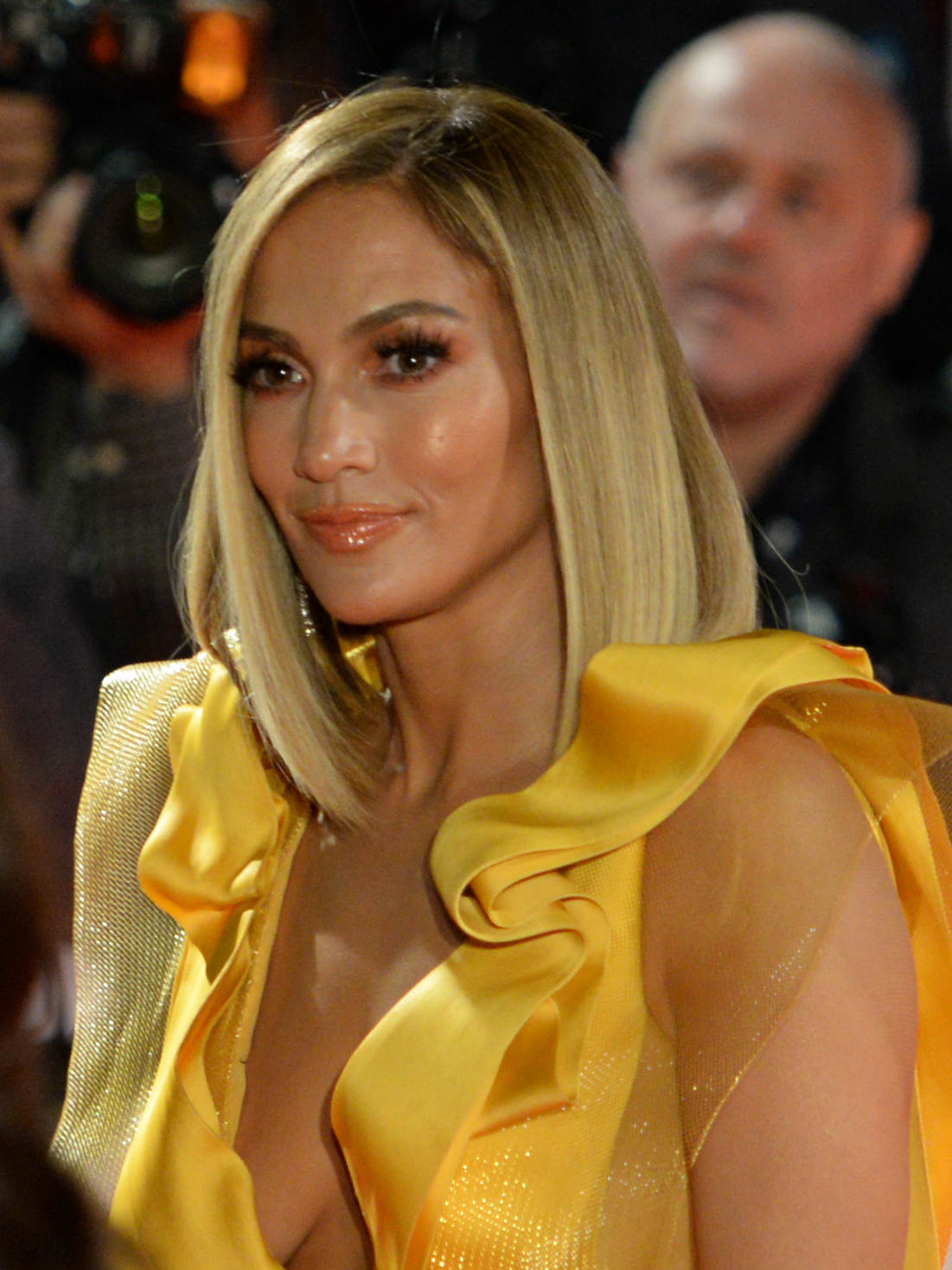
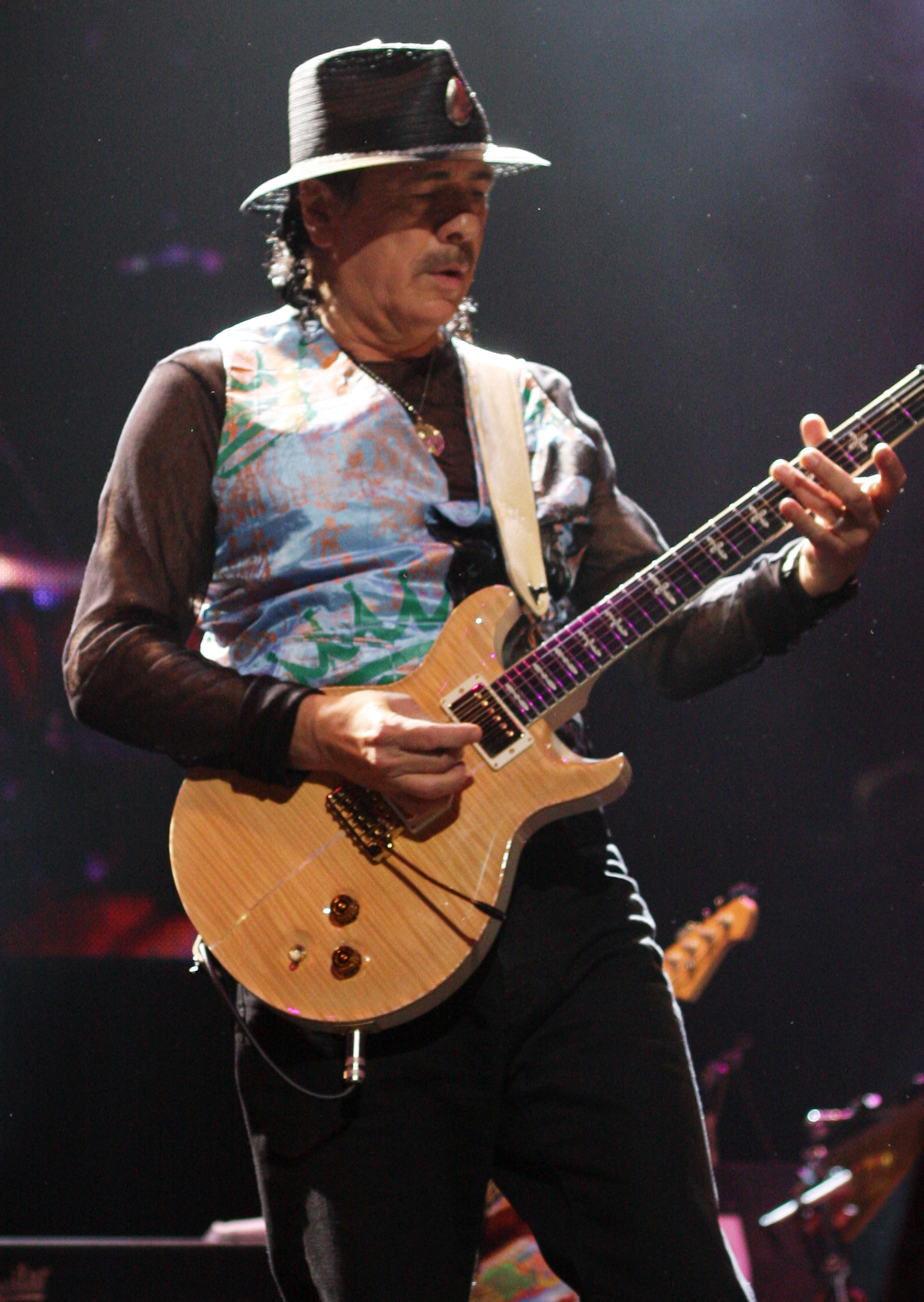
Clockwise from top left:
Bad Bunny, Jennifer Lopez, Carlos Santana

There are many Hispanic American musicians that have made a significant impact on the music industry and achieved fame within the United States and internationally, such as Eddy Navia, Christopher Rios better known by his stage name Big Pun, Jennifer Lopez, Joan Baez, Selena Gomez, Demi Lovato, Fergie, Pitbull, Pop Smoke, Victoria Justice, Linda Ronstadt, Zack de la Rocha, Gloria Estefan, Héctor Lavoe, Celia Cruz, Tito Puente, Kat DeLuna, Selena, Ricky Martin, Marc Anthony, Miguel, Carlos Santana, Christina Aguilera, Bruno Mars, Mariah Carey, Jerry García, Dave Navarro, Santaye, Elvis Crespo, Romeo Santos, Tom Araya, Sonny Sandoval, the Mars Volta, Los Lobos, Villano Antillano, South Park Mexican, Cuco, Yeat, Malo, OhGeesy, Malu Trevejo, Ice Spice, Young M.A, Lloyd Banks, Kay Flock, Exposé, Sweet Sensation, Jellybean, Immortal Technique, Brujeria, Fuerza Regida, Xavi, Aventura, Lunay, Myke Towers, Jay Wheeler, J.I., Amara La Negra, Joseline Hernandez, Lele Pons, Snow Tha Product, the Marías, Ángela Aguilar, Tego Calderón, Prince Royce, Don Omar, Eddie Palmieri, Wisin & Yandel, Melanie Martinez, Paloma Mami, Mariah Angeliq, That Mexican OT, MC Magic, TKA, La India, George Lamond, Sa-Fire, Cynthia, Lisa Lisa, Julieta Venegas, Intocable, Marisela, Pepe Aguilar, Jon Secada, Chayanne, DannyLux, Eslabon Armado, Iván Cornejo, Grupo Frontera, Yahritza y su Esencia, Herencia de Patrones, Omar Apollo, Eladio Carrión, Kid Frost, Cypress Hill, N.O.R.E., Fat Joe, Mellow Man Ace, Chicano Batman, Delinquent Habits, Lil Rob, Ritchie Valens, Ozomatli, BIA, Plan B, Chencho Corleone, Maye, Kap G, Tha Mexakinz, Brownside, Psycho Realm, A Lighter Shade of Brown, Gilberto Santa Rosa, Noriel, Baby Rasta, Brytiago, Farruko, J Álvarez, Darell, Nicky Jam, Ñengo Flow, Luis Fonsi, José Feliciano, Daddy Yankee, Lil Suzy, Judy Torres, Nayobe, Willie Colón, Jenni Rivera, Baby Bash, Frankie J, Larry Hernandez, Arcángel, De la Ghetto, Giselle Bellas, Juan Luis Guerra, Residente, Anuel AA, Ozuna, Lil Pump, Lil Xan, 6ix9ine, Becky G, Ivy Queen, Cardi B, Kali Uchis, Bad Bunny, Rauw Alejandro, all of the members of all-female band Go Betty Go, Daniela Avanzini from girl group Katseye, Camila Cabello, two members of girl group Fifth Harmony: Lauren Jauregui and Ally Brooke, and two members of the nu metal band Nonpoint.

Hispanic music imported from Cuba (chachachá, mambo, and rhumba) and Mexico (ranchera and mariachi) had brief periods of popularity during the 1950s. Examples of artists include Celia Cruz, who was a Cuban American singer and the most popular Latin artist of the 20th century, gaining twenty-three gold albums during her career. Bill Clinton awarded her the National Medal of Arts in 1994.

Among the Hispanic American musicians who were pioneers in the early stages of rock and roll were Ritchie Valens, who scored several hits, most notably "La Bamba" and Herman Santiago, who wrote the lyrics to the iconic rock and roll song "Why Do Fools Fall in Love". Songs that became popular in the United States and are heard during the holiday/Christmas season include "¿Dónde Está Santa Claus?", a novelty Christmas song with 12-year-old Augie Ríos which was a hit record in 1959 and featured the Mark Jeffrey Orchestra, "Feliz Navidad" by José Feliciano; and Mariah Carey's 1994 song "All I Want for Christmas Is You", which is the best-selling holiday song by a female artist. Miguel del Aguila wrote 116 works and has three Latin Grammy nominations.

In 1986, Billboard magazine introduced the Hot Latin Songs chart which ranks the best-performing songs on Spanish-language radio stations in the United States. Seven years later, Billboard initiated the Top Latin Albums which ranks top-selling Latin albums in the United States. Similarly, the Recording Industry Association of America incorporated "Los Premios de Oro y Platino" (The Gold and Platinum Awards) to certify Latin recordings which contains at least 50% of its content recorded in Spanish.

In 1989, Univision established the Lo Nuestro Awards which became the first award ceremony to recognize the most talented performers of Spanish-language music and was considered to be the "Hispanic Grammys". In 2000, the Latin Academy of Recording Arts & Sciences (LARAS) established the Latin Grammy Awards to recognize musicians who perform in Spanish and Portuguese. Unlike The Recording Academy, LARAS extends its membership internationally to Hispanophone and Lusophone communities worldwide beyond the Americas, particularly the Iberian Peninsula. Becky G won favorite female Latin artist, a brand new category at the AMAs in 2020. For the 63rd Annual Grammy Awards, the academy announced several changes for different categories and rules: the category Latin Pop Album has been renamed Best Latin Pop or Urban Album, while Latin Rock, Urban or Alternative Album has been renamed Best Latin Rock or Alternative Album.

===== Hispanic and Latino contributions to classical music in the United States =====
- Gustavo Dudamel -- Venezuela-born orchestra conductor
- Jaime Laredo -- Bolivia-born virtuoso violinist and acclaimed conductor

==== Film, radio, television, and theatre ====
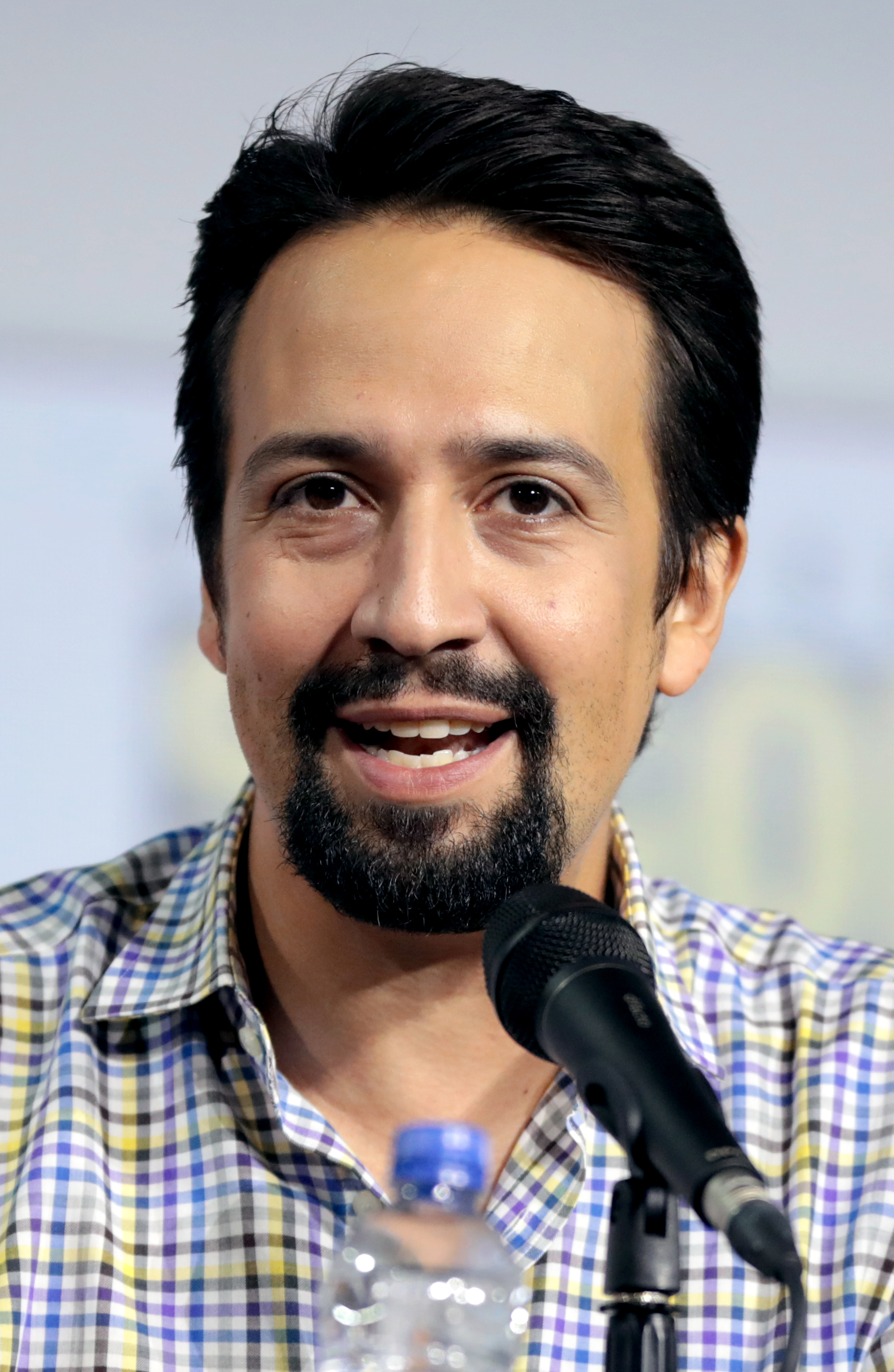
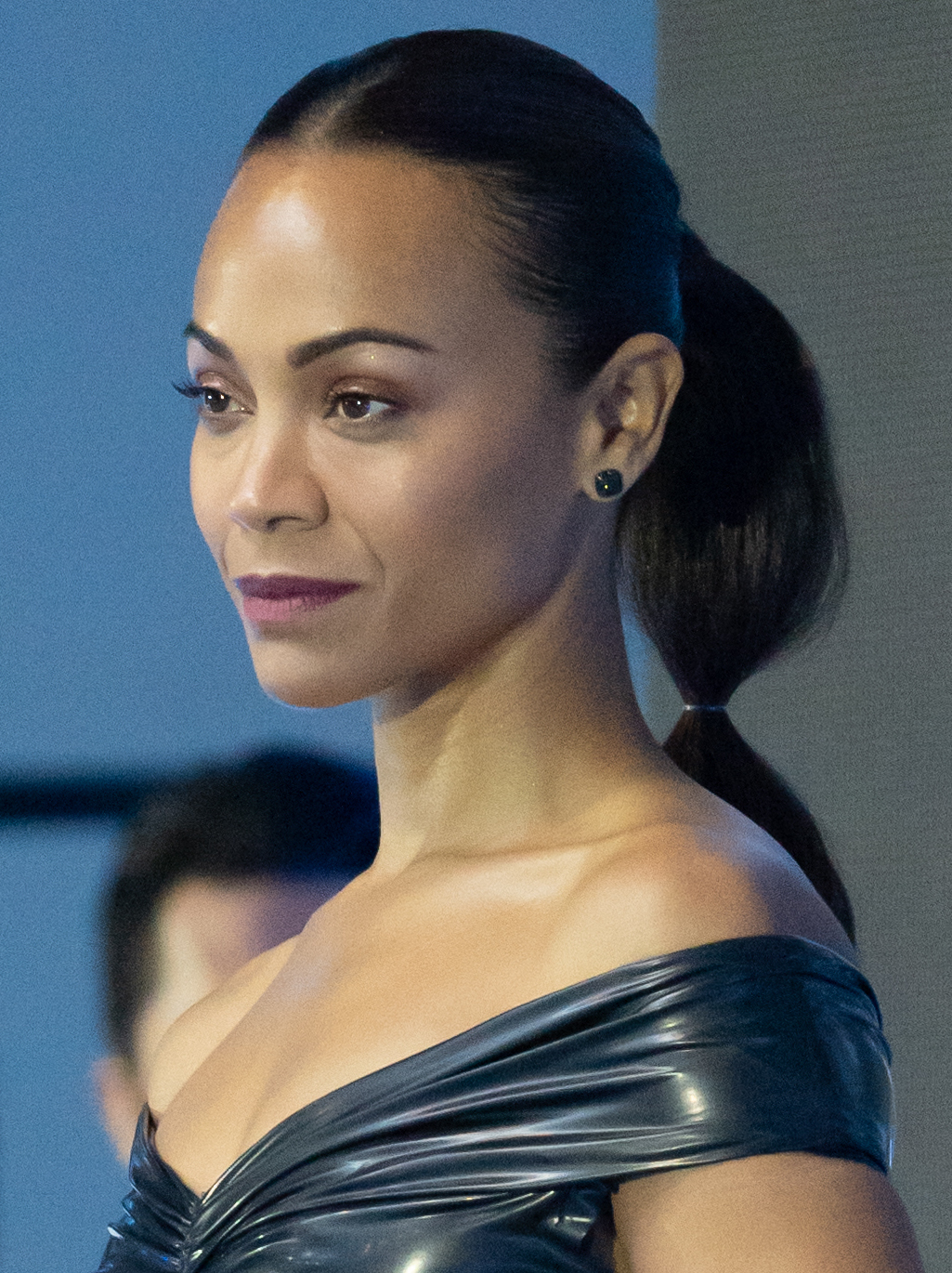
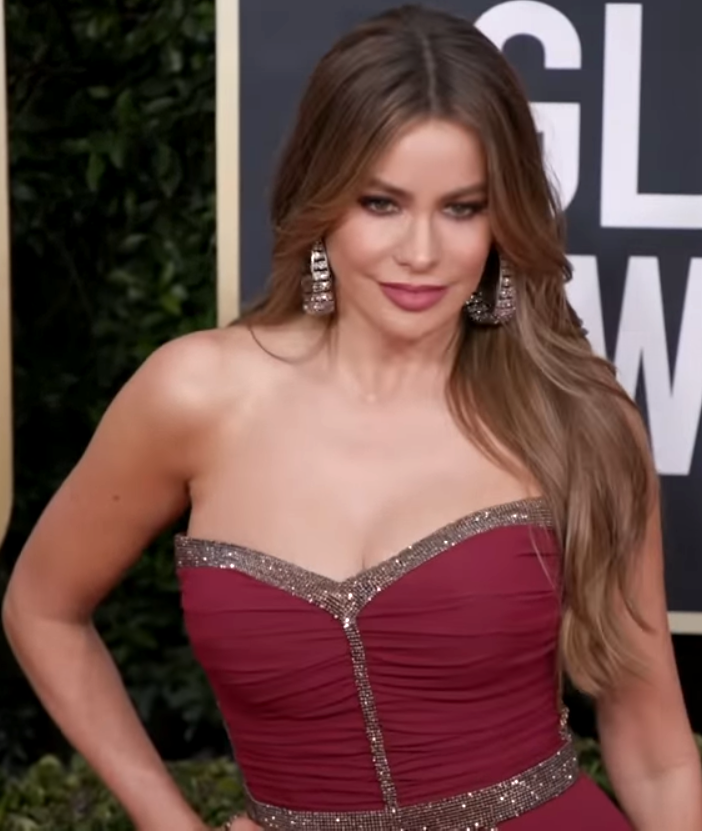
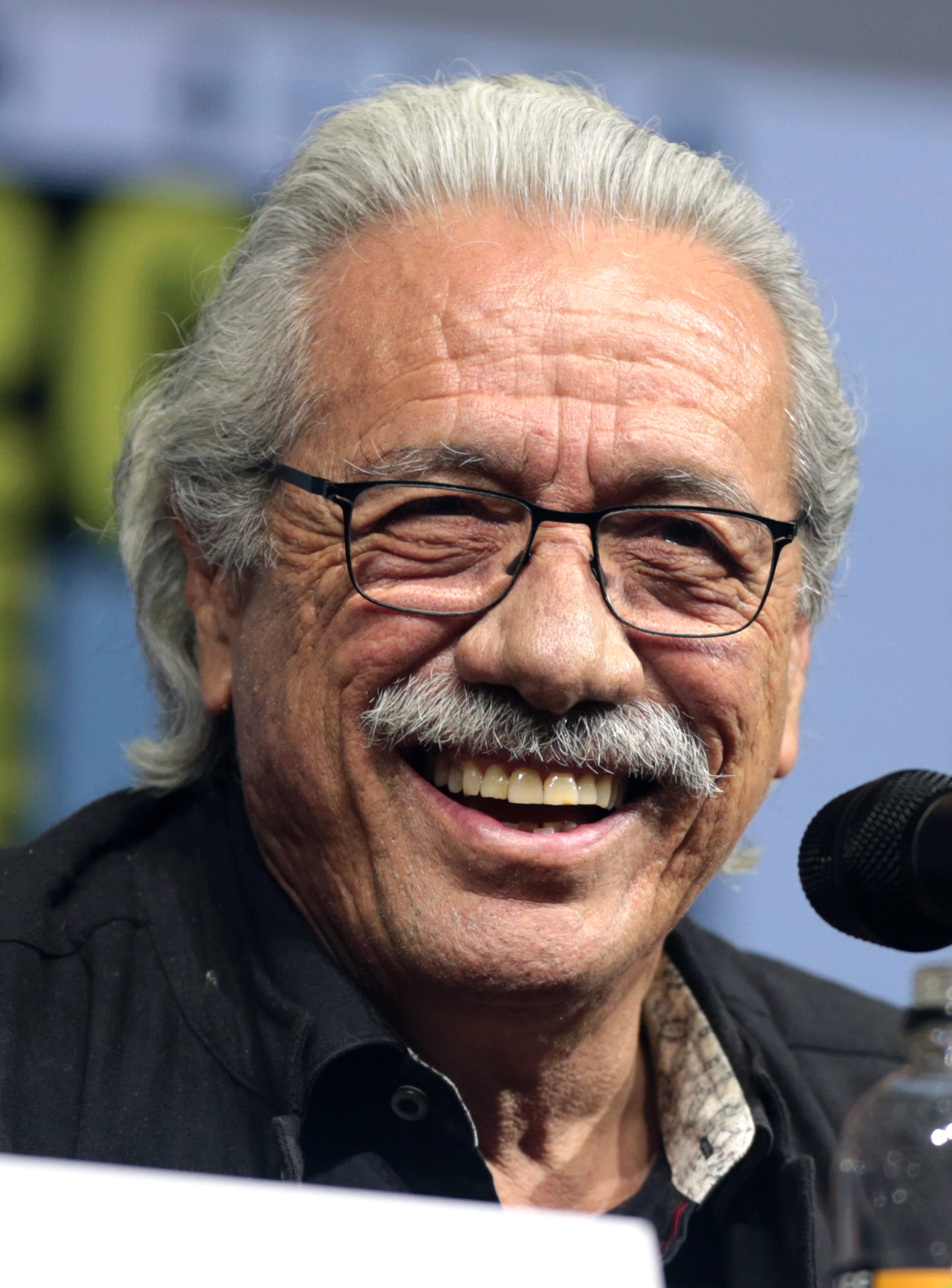
Clockwise from top left:
Lin-Manuel Miranda, Zoe Saldaña, Edward James Olmos, Sofía Vergara

American cinema has often reflected and propagated negative stereotypes of foreign nationals and ethnic minorities. For example, Hispanics are largely depicted as criminal, religious, temperamental, immigrant, low-income, while the women are sexualized. However representation in Hollywood has enhanced in latter times of which it gained noticeable momentum in the 1990s and does not emphasize oppression, exploitation, or resistance as central themes. According to Ramírez Berg, third wave films "do not accentuate Chicano oppression or resistance; ethnicity in these films exists as one fact of several that shape characters' lives and stamps their personalities". Filmmakers like Edward James Olmos and Robert Rodriguez were able to represent the Hispanic American experience like none had on screen before, and actors like Hilary Swank, Michael Peña, Jordana Brewster, Ana de Armas, Jessica Alba, Natalie Martinez and Jenna Ortega have become successful. In the last decade, minority filmmakers like Chris Weitz, Alfonso Gomez-Rejon and Patricia Riggen have been given applier narratives. Portrayal in films of them include La Bamba (1987), Selena (1997), The Mask of Zorro (1998), Nothing like the Holidays (2008), Dora and the Lost City of Gold (2019), Being the Ricardos (2001), Father of the Bride (2022) and Josefina López's Real Women Have Curves, originally a play which premiered in 1990 and was later released as a film in 2002. Bolivan-born Pato Hoffmann has appeared in television and film, playing native Americans in Westerns.

Hispanics have also contributed some prominent actors and others to the film industry. Of Puerto Rican origin: José Ferrer (the first Hispanic actor to win an acting Academy Award for his role in Cyrano de Bergerac), Auliʻi Cravalho, Rita Moreno, Chita Rivera, Raul Julia, Rosie Perez, Rosario Dawson, Esai Morales, Aubrey Plaza, Jennifer Lopez, and Benicio del Toro. Of Mexican origin: Emile Kuri (the first Hispanic to win an Academy Award – for Best Production Design – in 1949), Dolores del Río, Ramon Novarro, Lupe Vélez, Anthony Quinn, Ricardo Montalbán, Katy Jurado, Adrian Grenier, Jay Hernandez, Salma Hayek, Danny Trejo, Jessica Alba, Tessa Thompson, and Kate del Castillo. Of Cuban origin: Cesar Romero, Mel Ferrer, Andy García, Cameron Diaz, María Conchita Alonso, William Levy, and Eva Mendes. Of Argentine origin: Fernando Lamas, Carlos Thompson, Alejandro Rey, Anya Taylor-Joy, Camila Morrone, Maia Reficco, Julie Gonzalo, Stephanie Beatriz, Alexis Bledel, Ignacio Serricchio, Lorenzo Lamas and Linda Cristal. Of Dominican origin: Maria Montez and Zoe Saldaña. Of partial Spanish origin: Rita Hayworth, Martin Sheen. Other outstanding figures are: Anita Page (of Salvadoran origin), Raquel Welch (of Bolivian origin), John Leguizamo (of Colombian origin), Oscar Isaac (of Guatemalan origin), John Gavin and Pedro Pascal (both of Chilean origin).

One of the first Latina actresses to achieve success in Hollywood was Dolores del Río. She was born in Mexico, where she started her film career before moving to the US, where she rose to fame in American and international cinema. During the early sound era of film, del Río became well known for her roles and lively personality. In 1927, she began her career in silent cinema. The Gaucho, starring Douglas Fairbanks and directed by F. Richard Jones in 1928, is one of her well-known films. Being a Latina actress in Hollywood in the early 1900s, she was often cast in roles that reflected the image of Latina women as hostile and seductive. Hollywood's perception of Latinx identities frequently impacted these roles, and del Río portrayals were typically limited to these stereotypical representations of Latina women. Despite her adjustment and assimilation to Hollywood's expectations, del Río was proud of her Mexican background.

In stand-up comedy, Cristela Alonzo, Anjelah Johnson, Paul Rodríguez, Greg Giraldo, Cheech Marin, George Lopez, Freddie Prinze, Jade Esteban Estrada, Carlos Mencia, John Mendoza, Gabriel Iglesias and others are prominent.

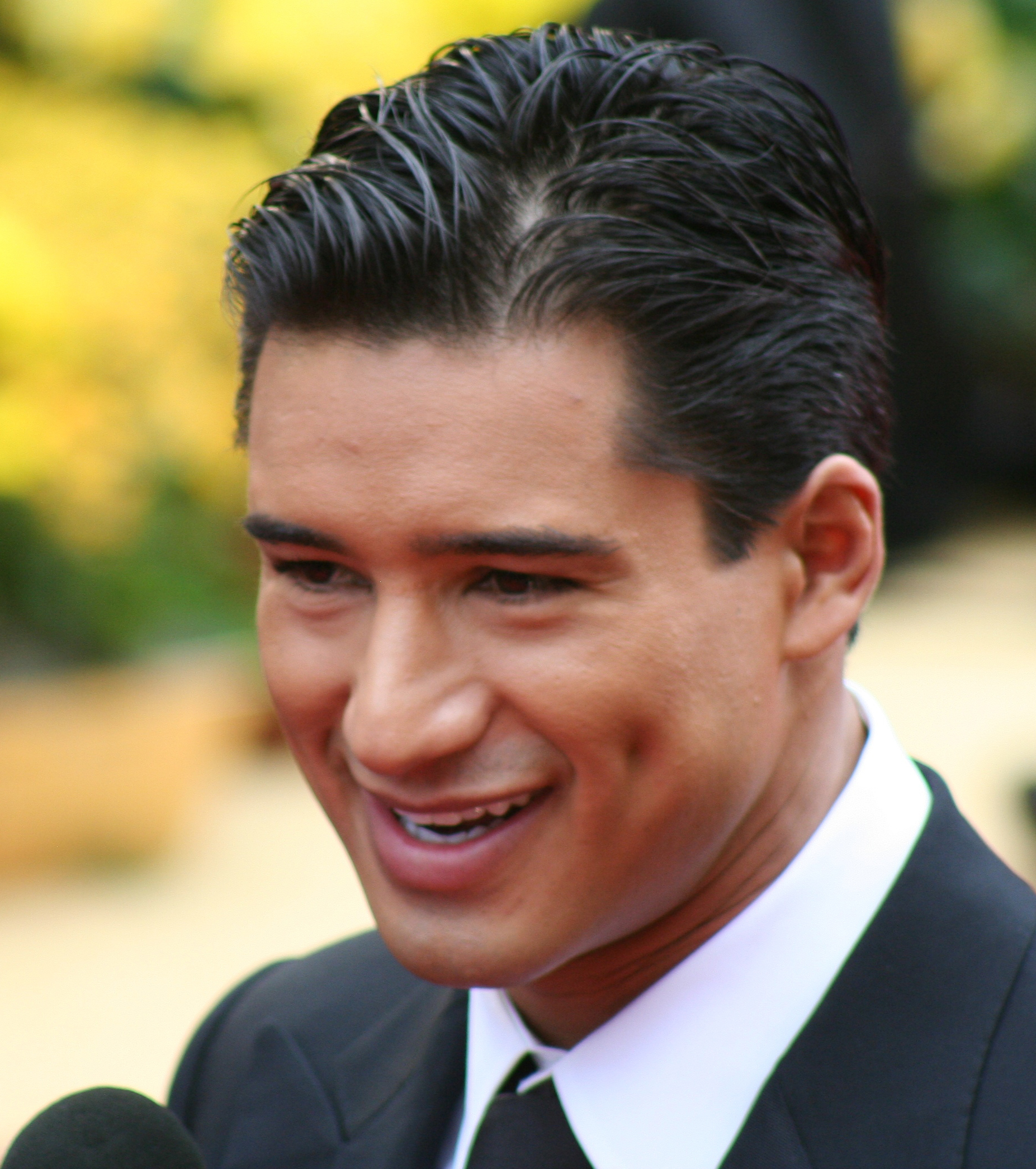
Mario Lopez actor, television host, and entertainment personality known for his roles in Saved by the Bell and as a host on various television programs.

Some of the Hispanic actors who achieved notable success in American television include Desi Arnaz, Lynda Carter, Jimmy Smits, Emily Rios, Charo, Jencarlos Canela, Christian Serratos, Carlos Pena Jr., Eva Longoria, Sofía Vergara, Ricardo Antonio Chavira, Jacob Vargas, Benjamin Bratt, Ricardo Montalbán, Hector Elizondo, Mario Lopez, America Ferrera, Karla Souza, Diego Boneta, Erik Estrada, Cote de Pablo, Freddie Prinze, Lauren Vélez, Isabella Gomez, Justina Machado, Tony Plana, Stacey Dash, and Charlie Sheen. Kenny Ortega is an Emmy Award-winning producer, director and choreographer who has choreographed many major television events such as Super Bowl XXX, the 72nd Academy Awards and Michael Jackson's memorial service.

Hispanics are underrepresented in American television, radio, and film. This is combatted by organizations such as the Hispanic Organization of Latin Actors (HOLA), founded in 1975; and National Hispanic Media Coalition (NHMC), founded in 1986. Together with numerous Hispanic civil rights organizations, the NHMC led a "brownout" of the national television networks in 1999, after discovering that there were no Hispanic on any of their new prime time series that year. This resulted in the signing of historic diversity agreements with ABC, CBS, Fox and NBC that have since increased the hiring of Hispanic talent and other staff in all of the networks.

Latino Public Broadcasting (LPB) funds programs of educational and cultural significance to Hispanic Americans. These programs are distributed to various public television stations throughout the United States.

The 72nd Primetime Emmy Awards was criticized by Hispanics; there were no major nominations for Hispanic performers, despite the Academy of Television Arts & Sciences publicizing their improved diversity in 2020. While there was a record number of Black nominees, there was only one individual Hispanic nomination. Hispanic representation groups said the greater diversity referred only to more African American nominees. When the Los Angeles Times reported the criticism using the term "Black", it was itself criticized for erasing Afro-Hispanics, a discussion that then prompted more investigation into this under-represented minority ethnic group in Hollywood. John Leguizamo boycotted the Emmys because of its lack of Hispanic nominees.

==== Fashion ====
In the world of fashion, notable Hispanic designers include Oscar de la Renta, Carolina Herrera, Narciso Rodriguez, Manuel Cuevas, Maria Cornejo, among others. Christy Turlington, Lais Ribeiro, Adriana Lima, Gisele Bündchen and Lea T achieved international fame as models.

==== Artists ====
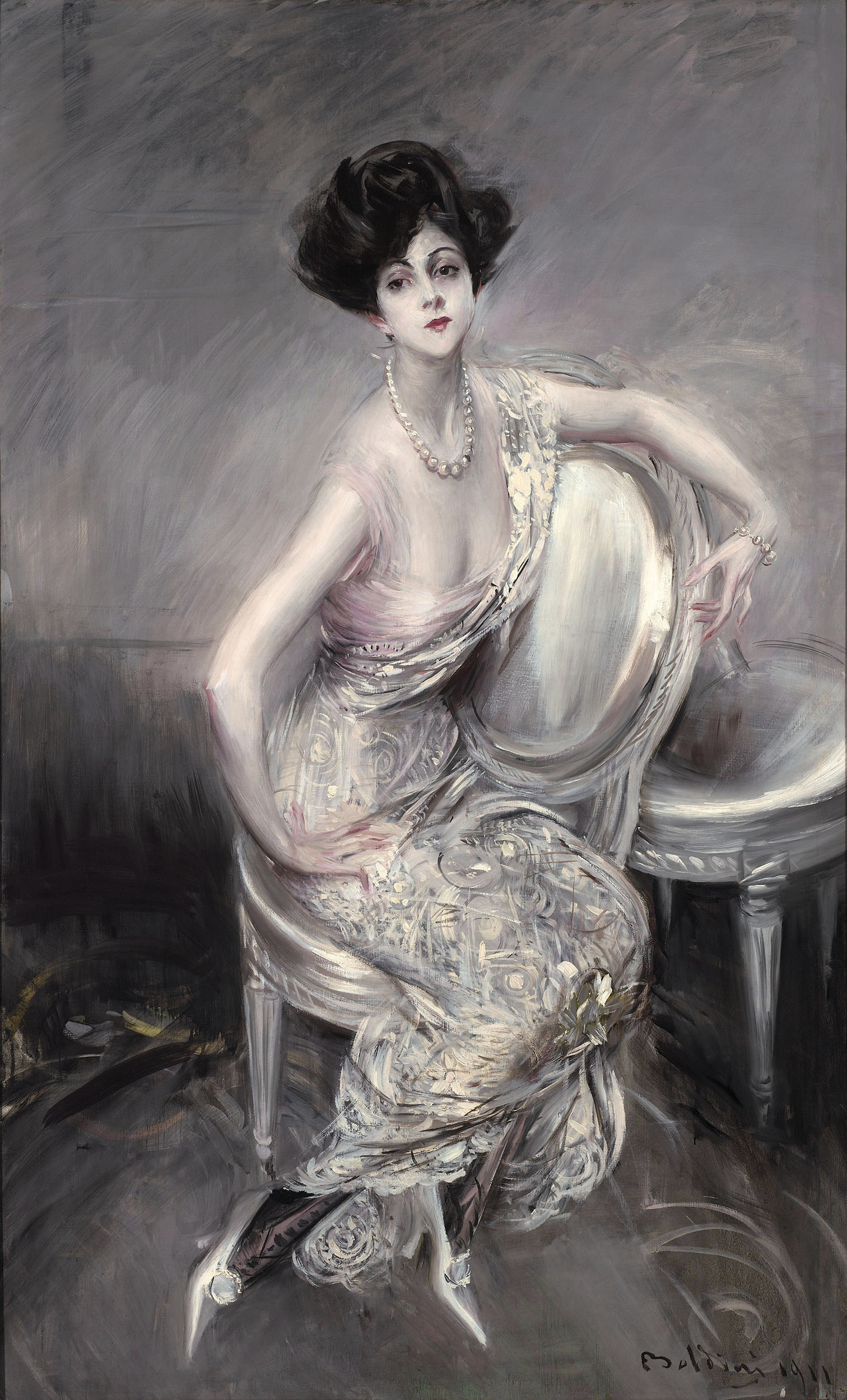
Rita de Acosta Lydig.

Notable Hispanic artists include Jean-Michel Basquiat, Judith Baca, Pablo Eduardo, Carmen Herrera, Patssi Valdez, Gronk, Luis Jiménez, Félix González-Torres, Ana Mendieta, Ester Hernandez, Joe Shannon, Richard Serra, Abelardo Morell, Bill Melendez, María Magdalena Campos Pons, Sandra Ramos, Myrna Báez, Soraida Martinez, Yolanda Gonzalez, and Antonio Sotomayor.

=== Business and finance ===
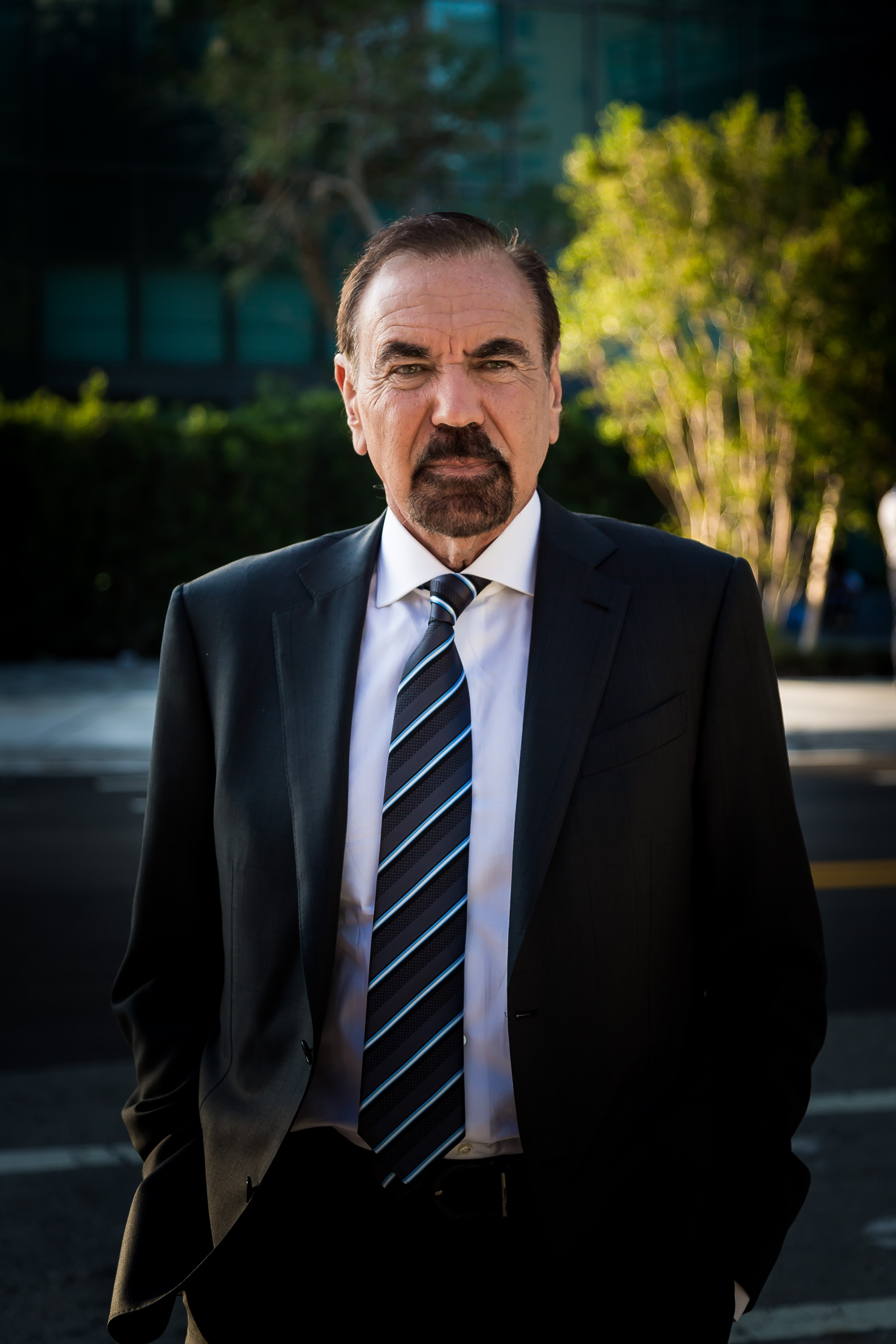
Real estate developer Jorge M. Pérez.

The total number of Hispanic-owned businesses in 2002 was 1.6 million, having grown at triple the national rate for the preceding five years.

Hispanic business leaders include Cuban immigrant Roberto Goizueta, who rose to head of The Coca-Cola Company. Advertising Mexican-American magnate Arte Moreno became the first Hispanic to own a major league team in the United States when he purchased the Los Angeles Angels baseball club. Also a major sports team owner is Mexican-American Linda G. Alvarado, president and CEO of Alvarado Construction, Inc. and co-owner of the Colorado Rockies baseball team.

There are several Hispanics on the Forbes 400 list of richest Americans. Alejandro Santo Domingo and his brother Andres Santo Domingo inherited their fathers stake in SABMiller, now merged with Anheuser-Busch InBev. The brothers are ranked No. 132 and are each worth $4.8bn. Jorge Perez founded and runs The Related Group. He built his career developing and operating low-income multifamily apartments across Miami. He is ranked No. 264 and is worth $3bn. Bolivian-American Marcelo Claure is a billionaire.

The largest Hispanic-owned food company in the United States is Goya Foods, because of World War II hero Joseph A. Unanue, the son of the company's founders. Angel Ramos was the founder of Telemundo, Puerto Rico's first television station and now the second largest Spanish-language television network in the United States after Univision, with an average viewership over one million in primetime. Samuel A. Ramirez Sr. made Wall Street history by becoming the first Hispanic to launch a successful investment banking firm, Ramirez & Co. Nina Tassler is president of CBS Entertainment since September 2004. She is the highest-profile Hispanic in network television and one of the few executives who has the power to approve the airing or renewal of series.

Since 2021, magazine Hispanic Executive has released a list of 30 under 30 executives in the United States. Members include financial analyst Stephanie Nuesi, fashion entrepreneur Zino Haro, and Obama scholar Josue de Paz.

=== Government and politics ===
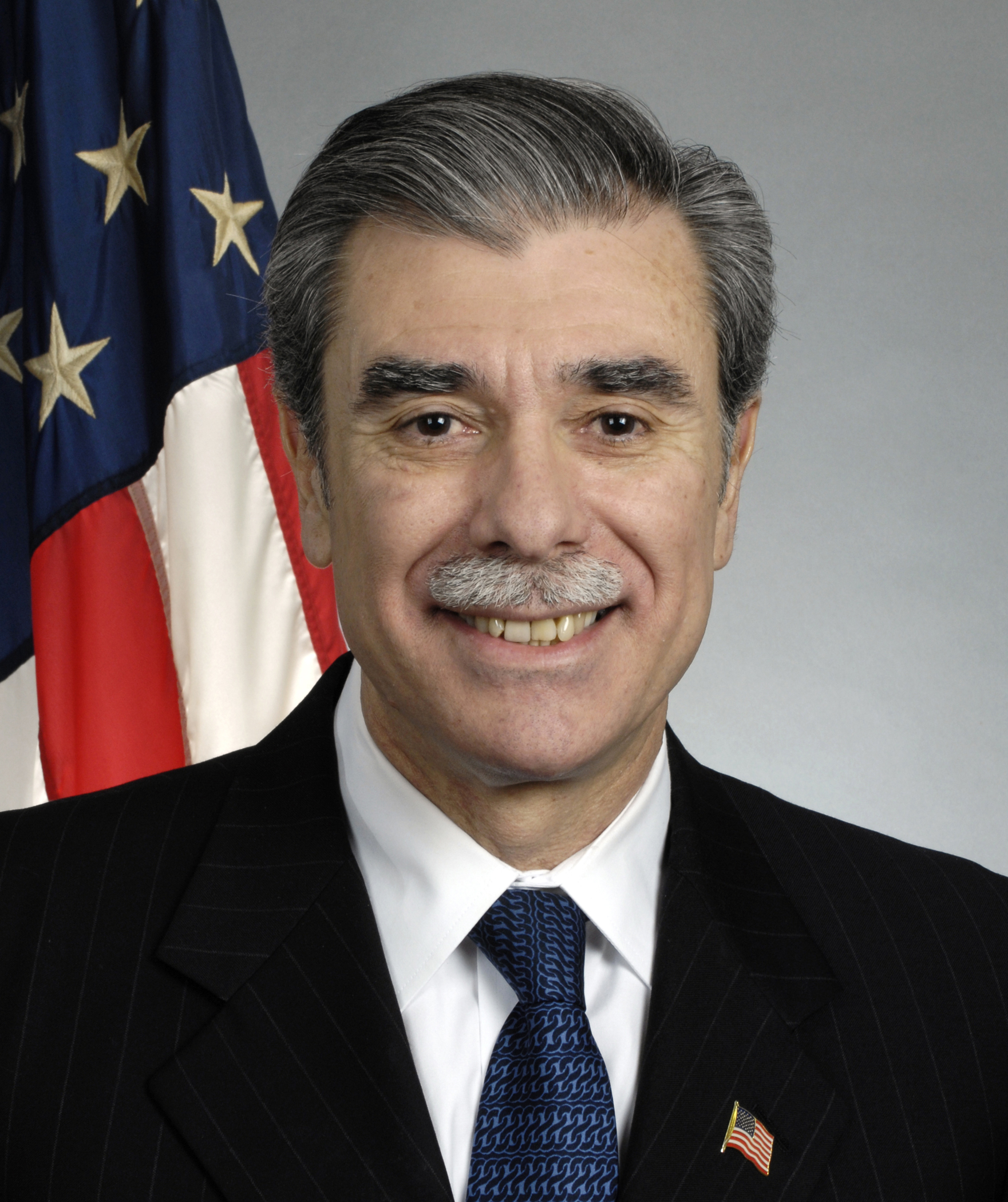
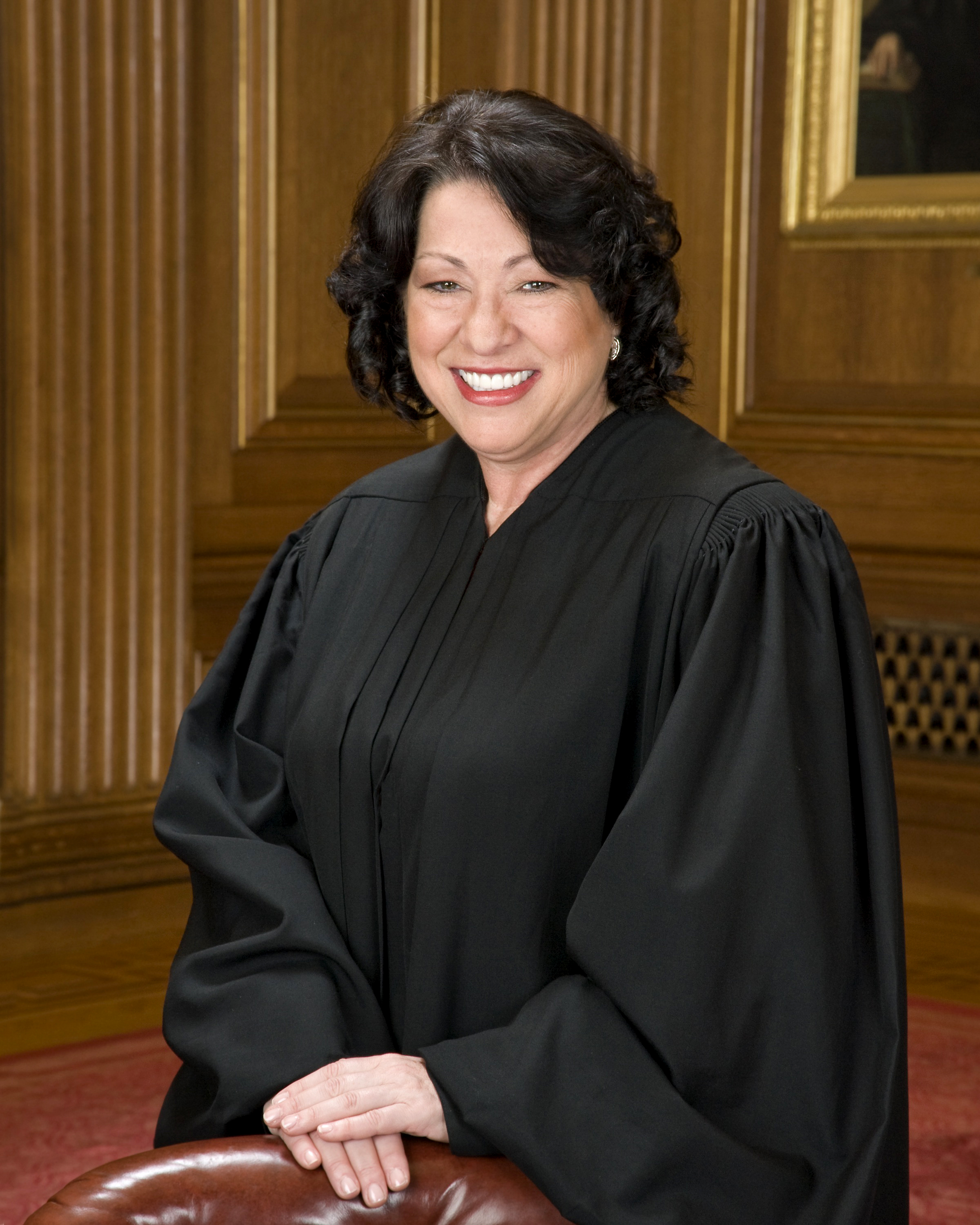
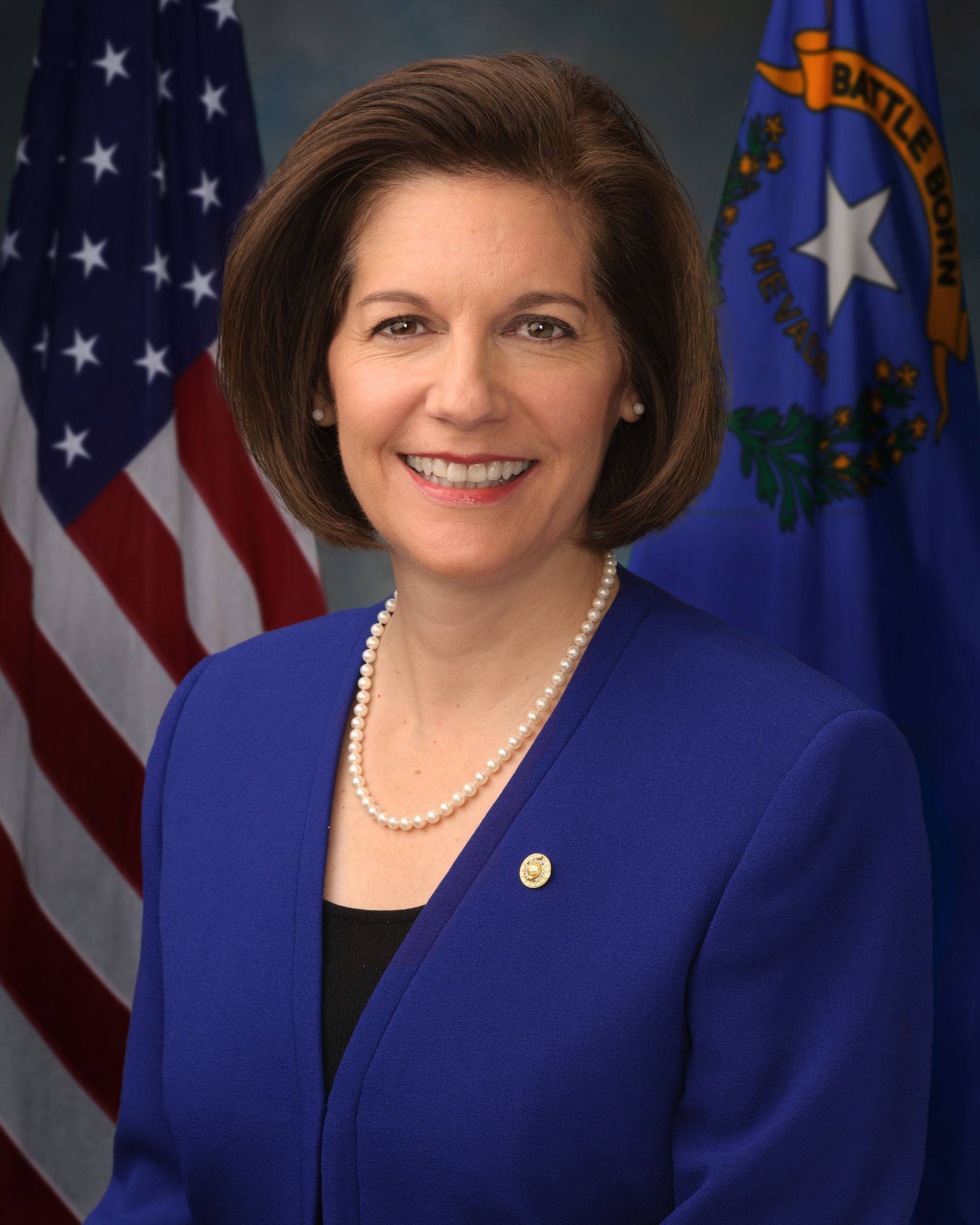
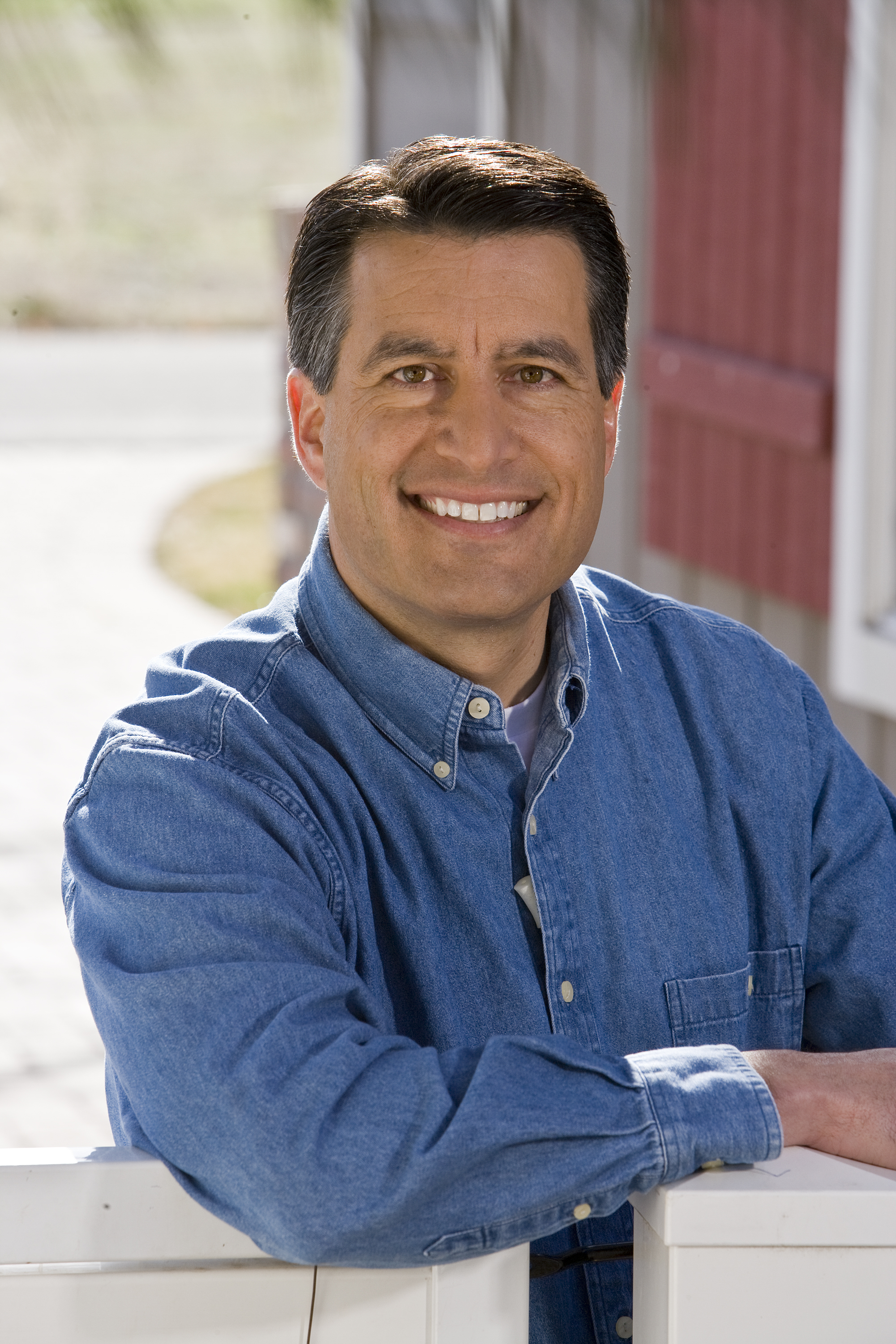
Clockwise from top left:
Carlos Gutierrez, Sonia Sotomayor, Brian Sandoval, Catherine Cortez Masto

As of 2007, there were more than five thousand elected officeholders in the United States who were of Hispanic origin.

In the House of Representatives, Hispanic representatives have included Ladislas Lazaro, Antonio M. Fernández, Henry B. Gonzalez, Kika de la Garza, Herman Badillo, Romualdo Pacheco and Manuel Lujan Jr., out of almost two dozen former representatives. Current representatives include Ileana Ros-Lehtinen, Jose E. Serrano, Luis Gutiérrez, Nydia Velázquez, Xavier Becerra, Lucille Roybal-Allard, Loretta Sanchez, Rubén Hinojosa, Mario Díaz-Balart, Raul Grijalva, Ben R. Lujan, Jaime Herrera Beutler, Raul Labrador and Alex Mooney—in all, they number thirty. Former senators are Octaviano Ambrosio Larrazolo, Mel Martinez, Dennis Chavez, Joseph Montoya and Ken Salazar. As of January 2011, the U.S. Senate includes Hispanic members Bob Menendez, a Democrat and Republicans Ted Cruz, both Cuban Americans.

Numerous Hispanics hold elective and appointed office in state and local government throughout the United States. Current Hispanic Governors include Republican Nevada Governor Brian Sandoval and Republican New Mexico Governor Susana Martinez; upon taking office in 2011, Martinez became the first Hispanic woman governor in the history of the United States. Former Hispanic governors include Democrats Jerry Apodaca, Raul Hector Castro, and Bill Richardson, as well as Republicans Octaviano Ambrosio Larrazolo, Romualdo Pacheco and Bob Martinez.

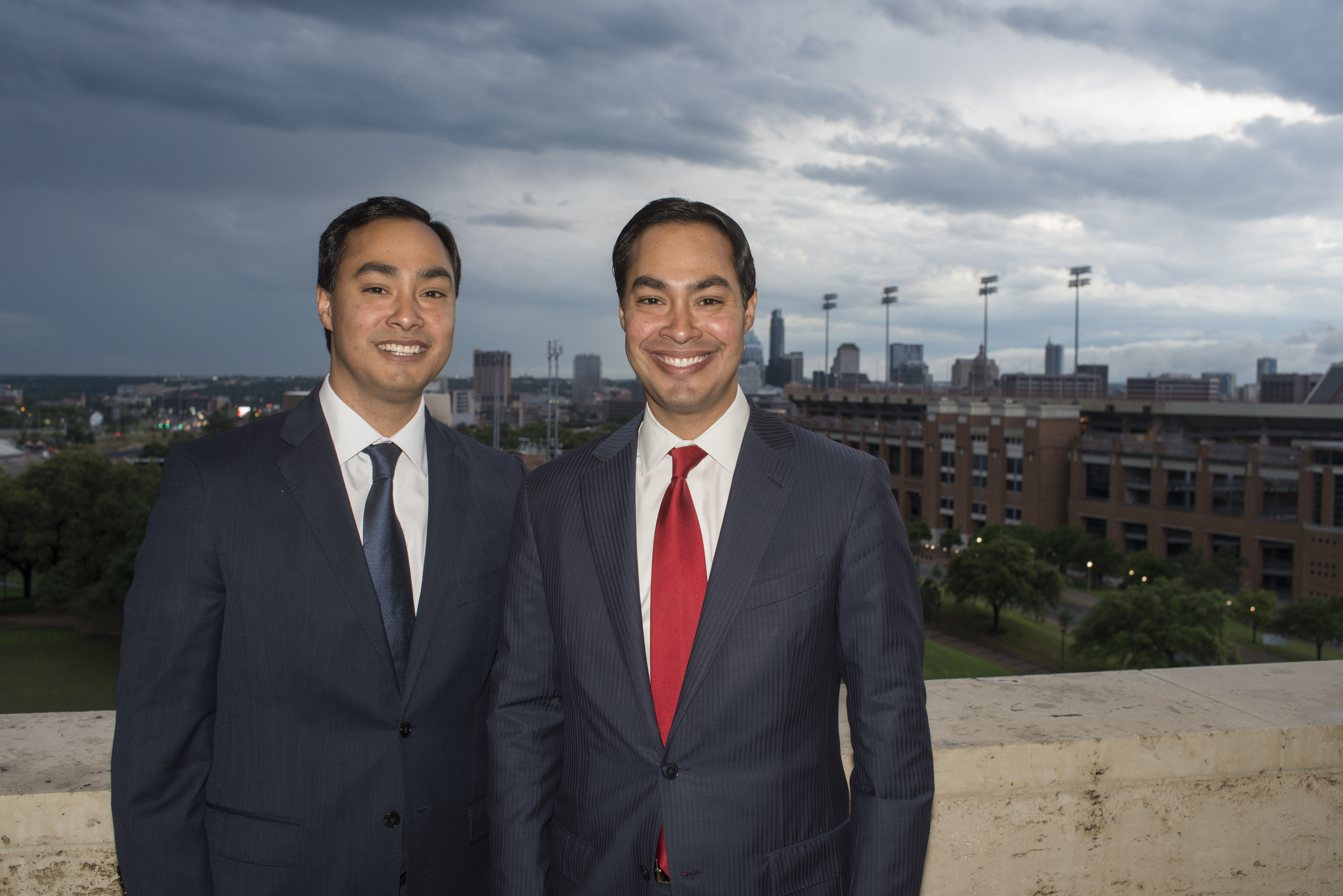
Secretary Julian Castro candidate for US President and his twin brother Representative Joaquin Castro.

Since 1988, when Ronald Reagan appointed Lauro Cavazos the Secretary of Education, the first Hispanic United States Cabinet member, Hispanic Americans have had an increasing presence in presidential administrations. Hispanics serving in subsequent cabinets include Ken Salazar, former Secretary of the Interior; Hilda Solis, former United States Secretary of Labor; Alberto Gonzales, former United States Attorney General; Carlos Gutierrez, Secretary of Commerce; Federico Peña, former Secretary of Energy; Henry Cisneros, former Secretary of Housing and Urban Development; Manuel Lujan Jr., former Secretary of the Interior; and Bill Richardson, former Secretary of Energy and Ambassador to the United Nations. Rosa Rios is the current US Treasurer, including the latest three, were Hispanic women.

In 2009, Sonia Sotomayor became the first Supreme Court Associate Justice of Hispanic origin.

In 2022, Robert Santos became the first Director of the U.S. Census Bureau of Hispanic origin (Mexican American).

In 2025, Marco Rubio became the first United States Secretary of State and acting United States National Security Advisor of Hispanic origin. He is currently the highest-ranking Hispanic American person in U.S. history.

The Congressional Hispanic Caucus (CHC), founded in December 1976, and the Congressional Hispanic Conference (CHC), founded on March 19, 2003, are two organizations that promote policy of importance to Americans of Hispanic descent. They are divided into the two major American political parties: The Congressional Hispanic Caucus is composed entirely of Democratic representatives, whereas the Congressional Hispanic Conference is composed entirely of Republican representatives.

Groups like the United States Hispanic Leadership Institute (USHLI) work to achieve the promises and principles of the United States by "promoting education, research, and leadership development, and empowering Hispanics and similarly disenfranchised groups by maximizing their civic awareness, engagement, and participation".

=== Literature and journalism ===
==== Writers and their works ====
- Julia Álvarez (How the García Girls Lost Their Accents)
- Rudolfo Anaya (Bless Me, Ultima and Heart of Aztlan)
- Marie Arana (American Chica, Bolívar: American Liberator, and Silver, Sword, and Stone
- Sandra Cisneros (The House on Mango Street and Woman Hollering Creek and Other Stories)
- Junot Díaz (The Brief Wondrous Life of Oscar Wao)
- Cecilia Domeyko (Sacrifice on the Border)
- Ernest Fenollosa (art historian, Masters of Ukiyoe)
- Rigoberto González (Butterfly Boy: Memories of a Chicano Mariposa)
- Oscar Hijuelos (The Mambo Kings Play Songs of Love)
- Jorge Majfud (Crisis and La frontera salvaje).
- Micol Ostow (Mind Your Manners, Dick and Jane and Emily Goldberg Learns to Salsa)
- Benito Pastoriza Iyodo (A Matter of Men and September Elegies)
- Alberto Alvaro Rios (Capirotada, Elk Heads on the Wall, and The Iguana Killer)
- Tomas Rivera (...And the Earth did Not Devour Him)
- Richard Rodríguez (Hunger of Memory)
- George Santayana (novelist and philosopher: "Those who cannot remember the past are condemned to repeat it")
- Sergio Troncoso (From This Wicked Patch of Dust and The Last Tortilla and Other Stories)
- Alisa Valdes-Rodriguez (Haters)
- Victor Villaseñor (Rain of Gold)
- Oscar Zeta Acosta (The Revolt of the Cockroach People)

==== Journalists ====
- Ana Cabrera currently works as a television news anchor for CNN in Manhattan.
- José Díaz-Balart is currently the anchor for Noticias Telemundo, as well as anchor of NBC Nightly News on Saturdays.
- Giselle Fernández, reporting and guest anchoring for CBS Early Show, CBS Evening News, NBC Today, NBC Nightly News; regular host for Access Hollywood.
- Natalie Morales is the Today Show West Coast anchor and appears on other programs including Dateline NBC and NBC Nightly News.
- Elizabeth Pérez, television journalist for CNN en Español.
- John Quiñones, co-anchor of the ABC News program, Primetime and now hosts What Would You Do?
- Morgan Radford, reporter employed by NBC News and MSNBC, was a production assistant for ESPN.
- Paola Ramos, correspondent for Vice and is a contributor to Telemundo and MSNBC.
- Jorge Ramos has won eight Emmy Awards and the Maria Moors Cabot Award for excellence in journalism. In 2015, Ramos was one of five selected as Time magazine's World's Most Influential People.
- Geraldo Rivera has won a Peabody Award and appears regularly on Fox News programs such as The Five.
- Michele Ruiz, former Los Angeles news anchor for KNBC-TV.
- Maria Elvira Salazar, journalist and broadcast television anchor who worked for Telemundo, CNN en Español and Noticiero Univision.
- Rubén Salazar, reporter for the Los Angeles Times and news director for KMEX, which was a Spanish language station.
- María Elena Salinas, CBS News contributor called the "Voice of Hispanic America" by The New York Times
- Cecilia Vega American journalist, currently serving as chief White House correspondent for ABC News.
- Juan Williams, Panama-born television and print journalist.
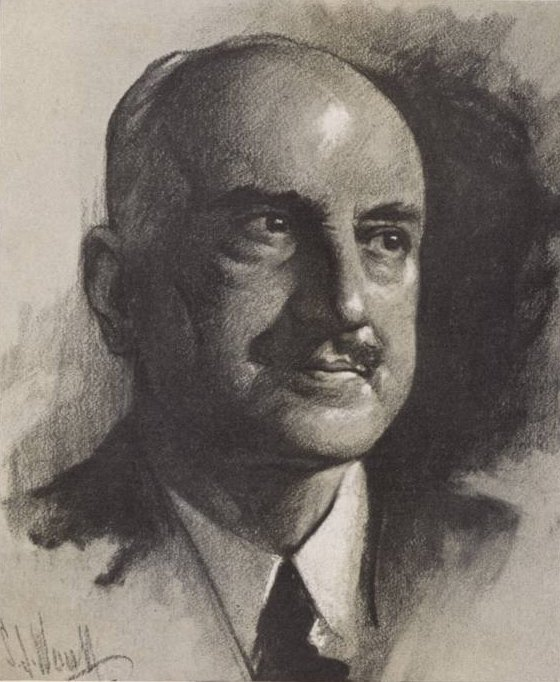
George Santayana was a philosopher, essayist, poet, and novelist.

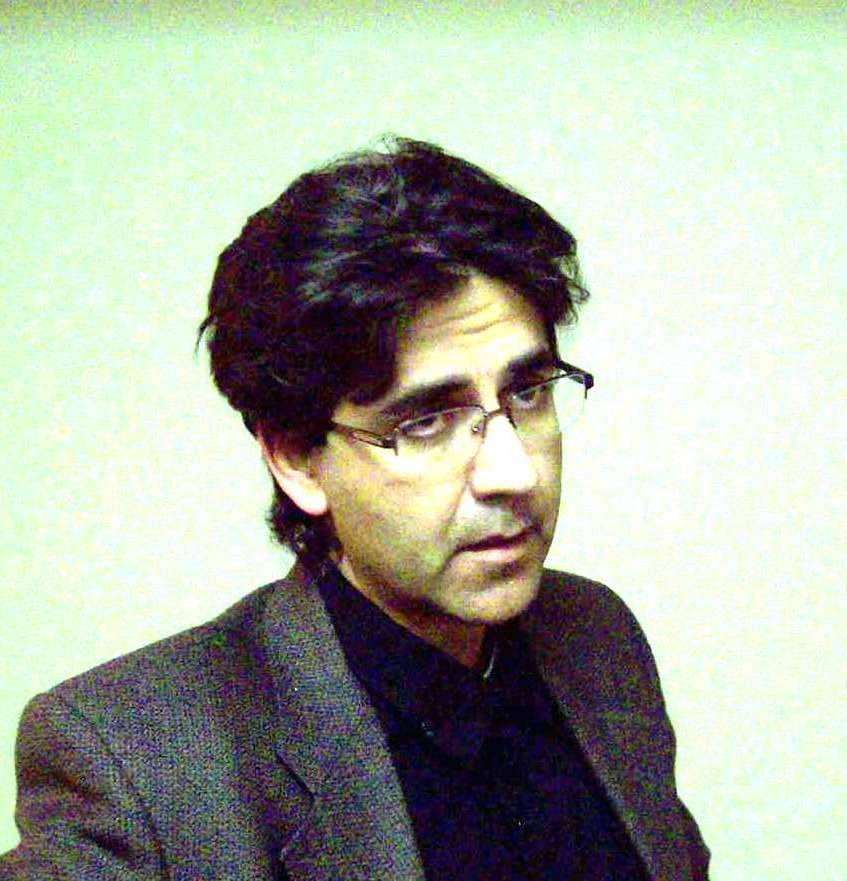
Jorge Majfud is a professor, essayist, and novelist

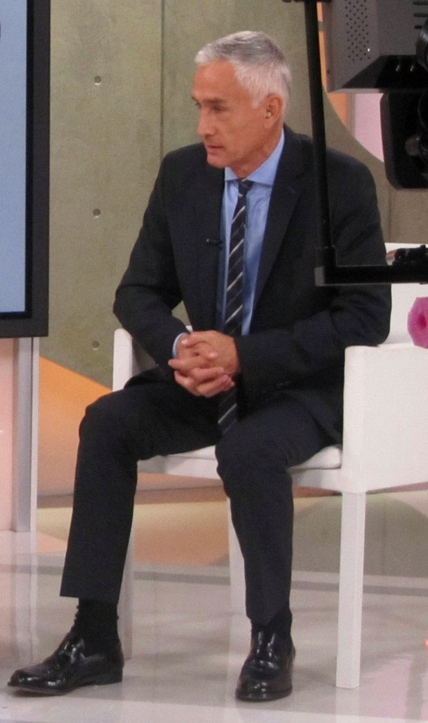
Jorge Ramos has won eight Emmy Awards.

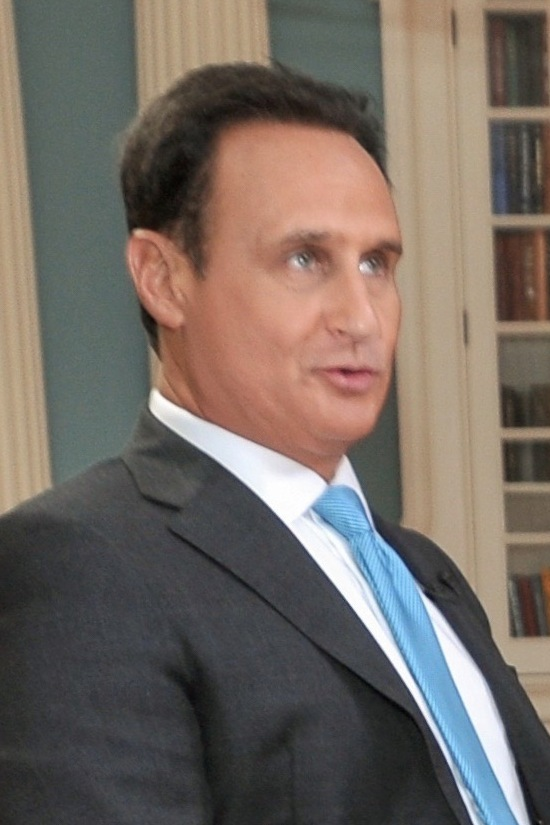
José Díaz-Balart.

==== Political strategists ====
- Mercedes Schlapp, American lobbyist and columnist for Fox News, including U.S. News & World Report and The Washington Times.
- Geovanny Vicente, political strategist, international consultant and columnist who writes for CNN.

=== Military ===
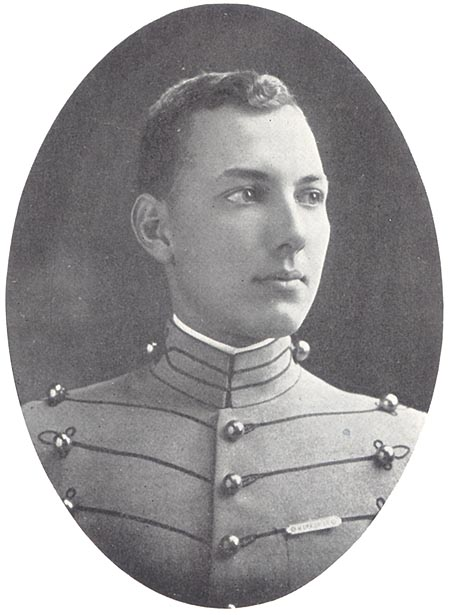
Major General Luis R. Esteves, the first Hispanic to graduate from the United States Military Academy ("West Point")

Hispanics have participated in the military of the United States and in every major military conflict from the American Revolution onward. 11% to 13% military personnel now are Hispanics and they have been deployed in the Iraq War, the Afghanistan War, and U.S. military missions and bases elsewhere. Hispanics have not only distinguished themselves in the battlefields but also reached the high echelons of the military, serving their country in sensitive leadership positions on domestic and foreign posts. Up to now, 43 Hispanics have been awarded the nation's highest military distinction, the Medal of Honor (also known as the Congressional Medal of Honor). The following is a list of some notable Hispanics in the military:

==== American Revolution ====
- Bernardo de Gálvez (1746–1786) – Spanish military leader and colonial administrator who aided the American Thirteen Colonies in their quest for independence and led Spanish forces against Britain in the Revolutionary War; since 2014, a posthumous honorary citizen of the United States.
- Lieutenant Jorge Farragut Mesquida (1755–1817) – participated in the American Revolution as a lieutenant in the South Carolina Navy.

==== American Civil War ====
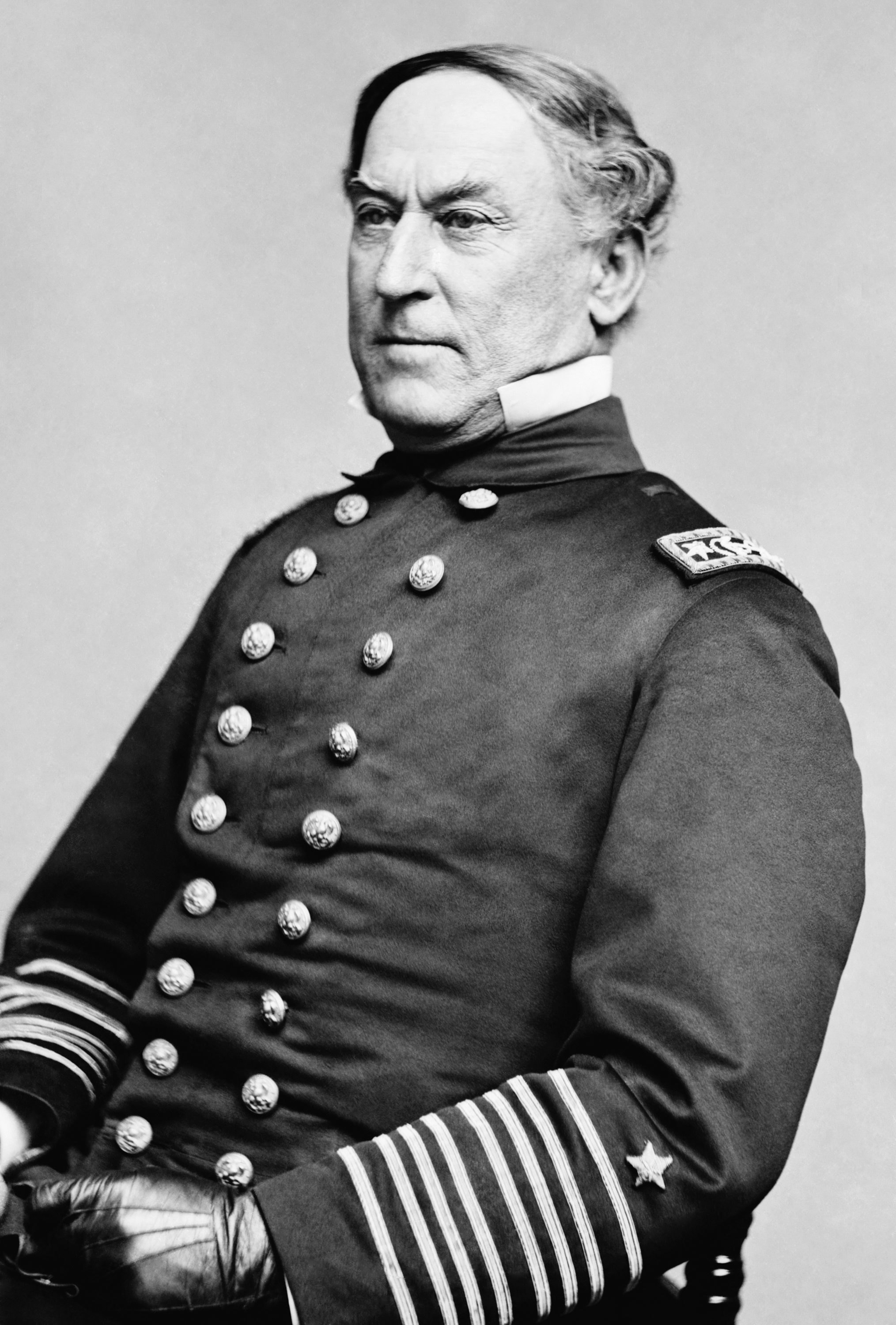
David Farragut, first full admiral in the US Navy

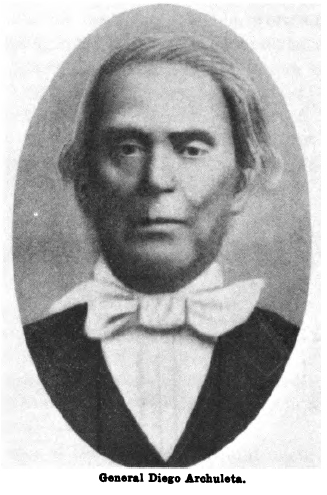
Diego Archuleta, first Hispanic to reach the military rank of Brigadier General

- Admiral David Farragut – promoted to vice admiral on December 21, 1864, and to full admiral on July 25, 1866, after the war, thereby becoming the first person to be named full admiral in the Navy's history.
- Rear Admiral Cipriano Andrade – Mexican Navy rear admiral who fought for the Union. He was buried at Arlington National Cemetery.
- Colonel Ambrosio José Gonzales – Cuban officer active during the bombardment of Fort Sumter; because of his actions, was appointed Colonel of artillery and assigned to duty as Chief of Artillery in the department of South Carolina, Georgia and Florida.
- Brigadier General Diego Archuleta (1814–1884) – member of the Mexican Army who fought against the United States in the Mexican–American War. During the American Civil War, he joined the Union Army (US Army) and became the first Hispanic to reach the military rank of brigadier general. He commanded The First New Mexico Volunteer Infantry in the Battle of Valverde. He was later appointed an Indian (Native Americans) Agent by Abraham Lincoln.
- Colonel Carlos de la Mesa – grandfather of Major General Terry de la Mesa Allen Sr. commanding general of the 1st Infantry Division in North Africa and Sicily, and later the commander of the 104th Infantry Division during World War II. Colonel Carlos de la Mesa was a Spanish national who fought at Gettysburg for the Union Army in the Spanish Company of the "Garibaldi Guard" of the 39th New York State Volunteers.
- Colonel Federico Fernández Cavada – commanded the 114th Pennsylvania Volunteer infantry regiment when it took the field in the Peach Orchard at Gettysburg.
- Colonel Miguel E. Pino – commanded the 2nd Regiment of New Mexico Volunteers, which fought at the Battle of Valverde in February and the Battle of Glorieta Pass and helped defeat the attempted invasion of New Mexico by the Confederate Army.
- Colonel Santos Benavides – commanded his own regiment, the "Benavides Regiment"; highest ranking Mexican-American in the Confederate Army.
- Major Salvador Vallejo – officer in one of the California units that served with the Union Army in the West.
- Captain Adolfo Fernández Cavada – served in the 114th Pennsylvania Volunteers at Gettysburg with his brother, Colonel Federico Fernandez Cavada; served with distinction in the Army of the Potomac from Fredericksburg to Gettysburg; "special aide-de-camp" to General Andrew A. Humphreys.
- Captain Rafael Chacón – Mexican American leader of the Union New Mexico Volunteers.
- Captain Roman Anthony Baca – member of the Union forces in the New Mexico Volunteers; spy for the Union Army in Texas.
- Lieutenant Augusto Rodriguez – Puerto Rican native; officer in the 15th Connecticut Volunteer Infantry, of the Union Army; served in the defenses of Washington, D.C., and led his men in the Battles of Fredericksburg and Wyse Fork.
- Lola Sánchez – Cuban-born woman who became a Confederate spy; helped the Confederates obtain a victory against the Union forces in the "Battle of Horse Landing".
- Loreta Janeta Velázquez, also known as "Lieutenant Harry Buford" – Cuban woman who donned Confederate garb and served as a Confederate officer and spy during the American Civil War.

==== World War I ====
- Major General Luis R. Esteves, United States Army – in 1915, became the first Hispanic to graduate from the United States Military Academy ("West Point"); organized the Puerto Rican National Guard.
- Private Marcelino Serna – undocumented Mexican immigrant who joined the United States Army and became the most decorated soldier from Texas in World War I; first Hispanic to be awarded the Distinguished Service Cross.

==== World War II ====
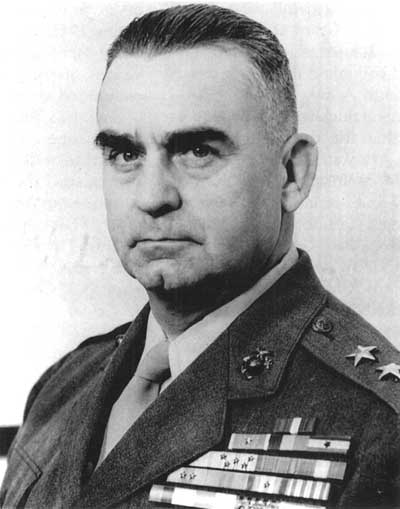
Pedro del Valle – first Hispanic to reach the rank of lieutenant general.

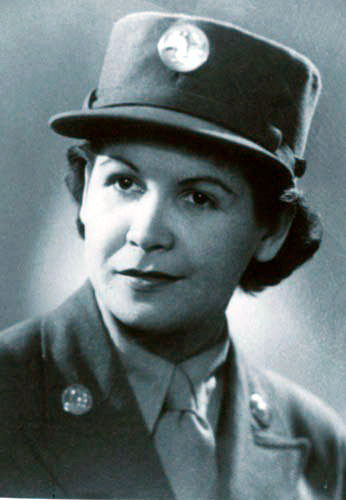
Carmen Contreras-Bozak – first Hispanic women to serve in the Women's Army Corps.

- Lieutenant General Pedro del Valle – first Hispanic to reach the rank of lieutenant general; played an instrumental role in the seizure of Guadalcanal and Okinawa as commanding general of the U.S. 1st Marine Division during World War II.
- Lieutenant General Elwood R. Quesada (1904–1993) – commanding general of the 9th Fighter Command, where he established advanced headquarters on the Normandy beachhead on D-Day plus one, and directed his planes in aerial cover and air support for the Allied invasion of the European continent during World War II. He was the foremost proponent of "the inherent flexibility of air power", a principle he helped prove during the war.
- Major General Terry de la Mesa Allen Sr. (1888–1969) – commanding general of the 1st Infantry Division in North Africa and Sicily during World War II; commander of the 104th Infantry Division.
- Colonel Virgil R. Miller – regimental commander of the 442d Regimental Combat Team, a unit composed of "Nisei" (second generation Americans of Japanese descent), during World War II; led the 442nd in its rescue of the Lost Texas Battalion of the 36th Infantry Division, in the forests of the Vosges Mountains in northeastern France.
- Captain Marion Frederic Ramírez de Arellano (1913–1980) – served in World War II; first Hispanic submarine commander.
- First Lieutenant Oscar Francis Perdomo – of the 464th Fighter Squadron, 507th Fighter Group; the last "Ace in a Day" for the United States in World War II.
- CWO2 Joseph B. Aviles Sr. – member of the United States Coast Guard; first Hispanic American to be promoted to chief petty officer; received a wartime promotion to chief warrant officer (November 27, 1944), thus becoming the first Hispanic American to reach that level as well.
- Sergeant First Class Agustín Ramos Calero – most decorated Hispanic soldier in the European Theatre of World War II.
- PFC Guy Gabaldon, United States Marine Corps – captured over a thousand prisoners during the World War II Battle of Saipan.
- Tech4 Carmen Contreras-Bozak – first Hispanic woman to serve in the United States Women's Army Corps, where she served as an interpreter and in numerous administrative positions.

==== Korean War ====
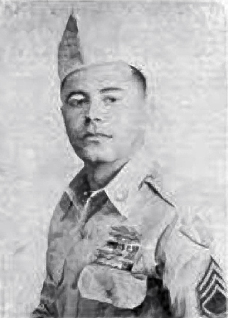
Modesto Cartagena, most decorated Puerto Rican soldier in history.

- Major General Salvador E. Felices, United States Air Force – flew in 19 combat missions over North Korea during the Korean War in 1953. In 1957, he participated in "Operation Power Flite", a historic project that was given to the Fifteenth Air Force by the Strategic Air Command headquarters. Operation Power Flite was the first around the world non-stop flight by an all-jet aircraft.
- First Lieutenant Baldomero Lopez – the only Hispanic graduate of the United States Naval Academy ("Annapolis") to be awarded the Medal of Honor.
- Sergeant First Class Modesto Cartagena – member of the 65th Infantry Regiment, an all-Puerto Rican regiment also known as "The Borinqueneers", during World War II and the Korean War; most decorated Puerto Rican soldier in history.

==== Cuban Missile Crisis ====
- Admiral Horacio Rivero, Jr. – second Hispanic four-star admiral; commander of the American fleet sent by President John F. Kennedy to set up a quarantine (blockade) of the Soviet ships during the Cuban Missile Crisis.

==== Vietnam War ====
- Sergeant First Class Jorge Otero Barreto a.k.a. "The Puerto Rican Rambo"– the most decorated Hispanic American soldier in the Vietnam War.

==== After the Vietnam War ====
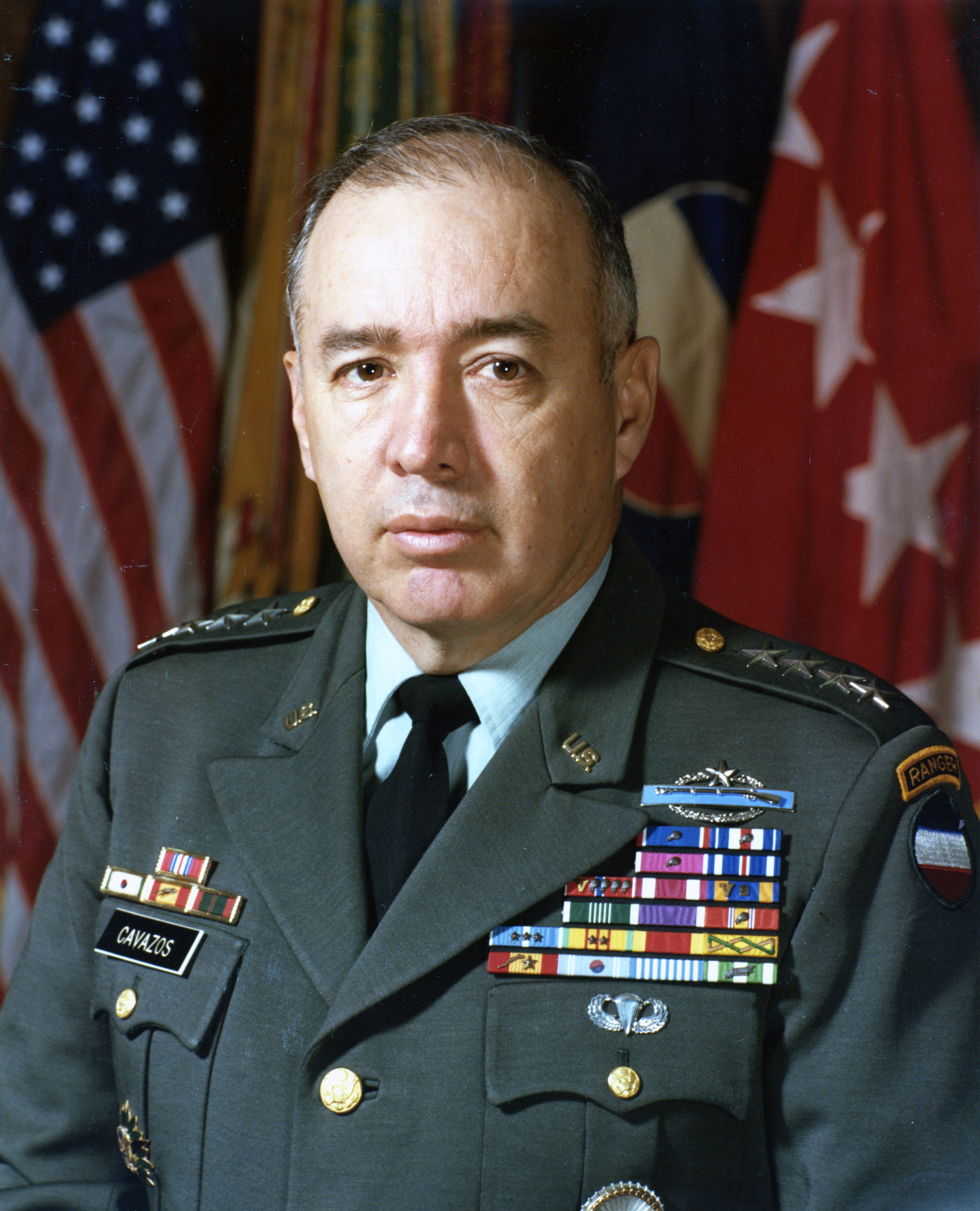
Richard E. Cavazos, first Hispanic four-star general.

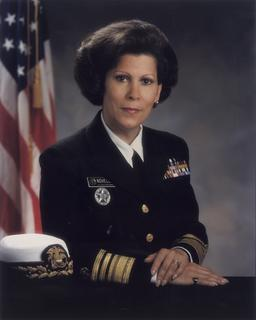
Antonia Novello, first woman and first Hispanic to serve as Surgeon General.

- Lieutenant General Ricardo Sanchez – top commander of the Coalition forces during the first year of the occupation of Iraq, 2003–2004, during the Iraq War.
- Lieutenant General Edward D. Baca – in 1994, became the first Hispanic Chief of the National Guard Bureau.
- Vice Admiral Antonia Novello, M.D., Public Health Service Commissioned Corps – in 1990, became the first Hispanic (and first female) U.S. Surgeon General.
- Vice Admiral Richard Carmona, M.D., Public Health Service Commissioned Corps – served as the 17th Surgeon General of the United States, under President George W. Bush
- Brigadier General Joseph V. Medina, USMC – made history by becoming the first Marine Corps officer to take command of a naval flotilla.
- Rear Admiral Ronald J. Rábago – first person of Hispanic descent to be promoted to rear admiral (lower half) in the United States Coast Guard.
- Captain Linda Garcia Cubero, United States Air Force – in 1980, became the first Hispanic woman graduate of the United States Air Force.
- Major General Erneido Oliva – deputy commanding general of the D.C. National Guard.
- Brigadier General Carmelita Vigil-Schimmenti, United States Air Force – in 1985 became the first Hispanic female to attain the rank of brigadier general in the Air Force.
- Brigadier General Angela Salinas – on August 2, 2006, became the first Hispanic female to obtain a general rank in the Marines.
- Chief Master Sergeant Ramón Colón-López – pararescueman; in 2007, was the only Hispanic among the first six airmen to be awarded the newly created Air Force Combat Action Medal.
- Specialist Hilda Clayton (1991–2013) – combat photographer with 55th Signal Company who captured the explosion that killed her and four Afghan soldiers.
- Major Emily Georgette Sfeir - military intelligence; veteran of Iraq and Afghanistan wars
- Colonel Debra Lopez Fix - first Hispanic American woman to graduate West Point (1981) and survivor of the Pentagon attacks of Sept. 11, 2001.

==== Medal of Honor ====
The following 43 Hispanics were awarded the Medal of Honor:

Philip Bazaar, Joseph H. De Castro, John Ortega, France Silva, David B. Barkley, Lucian Adams, Rudolph B. Davila, Marcario Garcia, Harold Gonsalves, David M. Gonzales, Silvestre S. Herrera, Jose M. Lopez, Joe P. Martinez, Manuel Perez Jr., Cleto L. Rodriguez, Alejandro R. Ruiz, Jose F. Valdez, Ysmael R. Villegas, Fernando Luis García, Edward Gomez, Ambrosio Guillen, Rodolfo P. Hernandez, Baldomero Lopez, Benito Martinez, Eugene Arnold Obregon, Joseph C. Rodriguez, John P. Baca, Roy P. Benavidez, Emilio A. De La Garza, Ralph E. Dias, Daniel Fernandez, Alfredo Cantu "Freddy" Gonzalez, Jose Francisco Jimenez, Miguel Keith, Carlos James Lozada, Alfred V. Rascon, Louis R. Rocco, Euripides Rubio, Hector Santiago-Colon, Elmelindo Rodrigues Smith, Jay R. Vargas, Humbert Roque Versace and Maximo Yabes.

==== National intelligence ====
- In the spy arena, José Rodríguez, a native of Puerto Rico, was the deputy director of operations and subsequently Director of the National Clandestine Service (D/NCS), two senior positions in the Central Intelligence Agency (CIA), between 2004 and 2007.
- Lieutenant Colonel Mercedes O. Cubria (1903–1980), a.k.a. La Tía (The Aunt), was the first Cuban-born female officer in the United States Army. She served in the Women's Army Corps during World War II and in the United States Army during the Korean War, and was recalled into service during the Cuban Missile Crisis. In 1988, she was posthumously inducted into the Military Intelligence Hall of Fame.

=== Science and technology ===
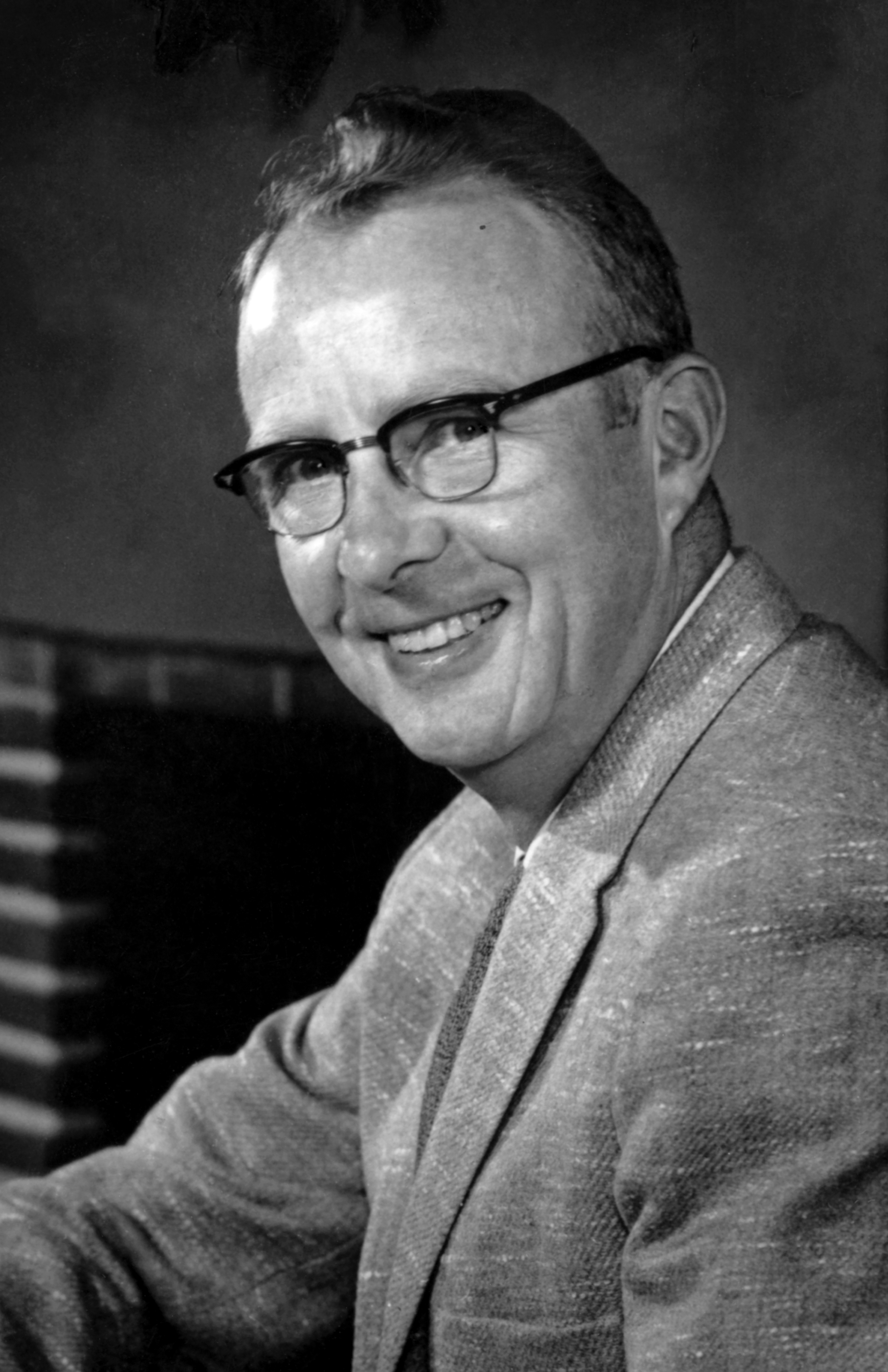
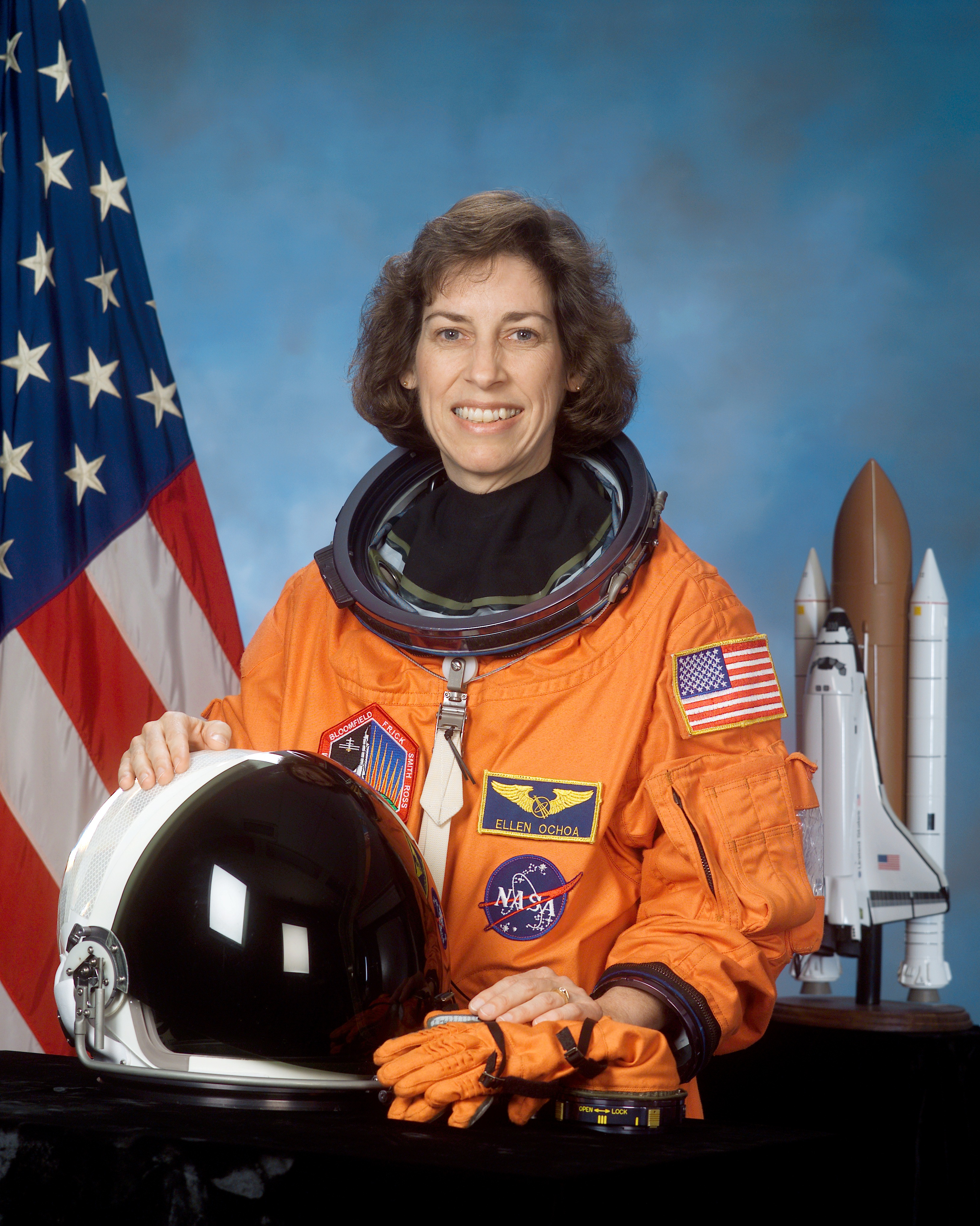
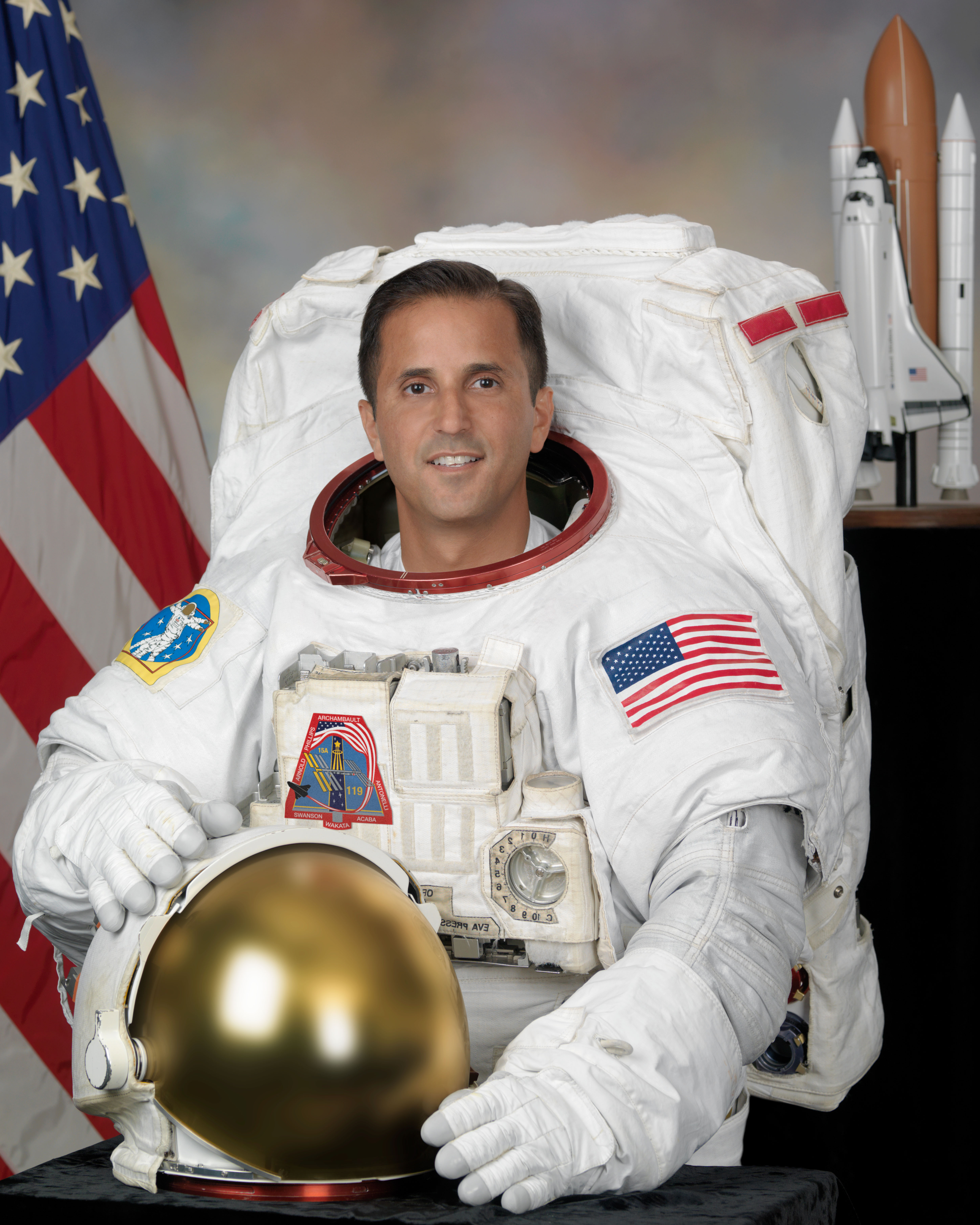
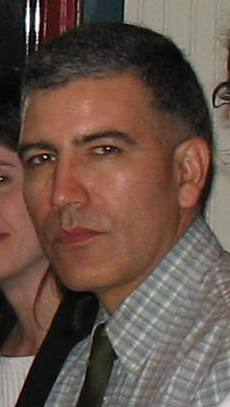
Clockwise from top left:
Luis Walter Álvarez, Ellen Ochoa, Francisco Javier Duarte, Joseph Acaba

Among Hispanic Americans who have excelled in science are Luis Walter Álvarez, Nobel Prize–winning physicist of Spanish descent, and his son Walter Alvarez, a geologist. They first proposed that an asteroid impact on the Yucatán Peninsula caused the extinction of the dinosaurs. Mario J. Molina won the Nobel Prize in chemistry and currently works in the chemistry department at the University of California, San Diego. Dr. Victor Manuel Blanco is an astronomer who in 1959 discovered "Blanco 1", a galactic cluster. F. J. Duarte is a laser physicist and author; he received the Engineering Excellence Award from the prestigious Optical Society of America for the invention of the N-slit laser interferometer. Alfredo Quiñones-Hinojosa is the director of the Pituitary Surgery Program at Johns Hopkins Hospital and the director of the Brain Tumor Stem Cell Laboratory at Johns Hopkins School of Medicine. Physicist Albert Baez made important contributions to the early development of X-ray microscopes and later X-ray telescopes. His nephew John Carlos Baez is also a noted mathematical physicist. Francisco J. Ayala is a biologist and philosopher, former president of the American Association for the Advancement of Science, and has been awarded the National Medal of Science and the Templeton Prize. Peruvian-American biophysicist Carlos Bustamante has been named a Searle Scholar and Alfred P. Sloan Foundation Fellow. Luis von Ahn is one of the pioneers of crowdsourcing and the founder of the companies reCAPTCHA and Duolingo. Colombian-American Ana Maria Rey received a MacArthur Fellowship for her work in atomic physics in 2013.

Dr. Fernando E. Rodríguez Vargas discovered the bacteria that cause dental cavity. Dr. Gualberto Ruaño is a biotechnology pioneer in the field of personalized medicine and the inventor of molecular diagnostic systems, Coupled Amplification and Sequencing (CAS) System, used worldwide for the management of viral diseases. Fermín Tangüis was an agriculturist and scientist who developed the Tangüis Cotton in Peru and saved that nation's cotton industry. Severo Ochoa, born in Spain, was a co-winner of the 1959 Nobel Prize in Physiology or Medicine. Dr. Sarah Stewart, a Mexican-American microbiologist, is credited with the discovery of the Polyomavirus and successfully demonstrating that cancer causing viruses could be transmitted from animal to animal. Mexican-American psychiatrist Dr. Nora Volkow, whose brain imaging studies helped characterize the mechanisms of drug addiction, is the current director of the National Institute on Drug Abuse. Dr. Helen Rodríguez Trías, an early advocate for women's reproductive rights, helped drive and draft U.S. federal sterilization guidelines in 1979. She was awarded the Presidential Citizens Medal by President Bill Clinton, and was the first Hispanic president of the American Public Health Association. A neuroscientist who studies brain stem cells is Mohammed Mostajo-Radji. Noteworthy medical doctors are Argentina-born Carlos Pellegrini and Bolivia-born Fernando Gonzalez Sfeir.

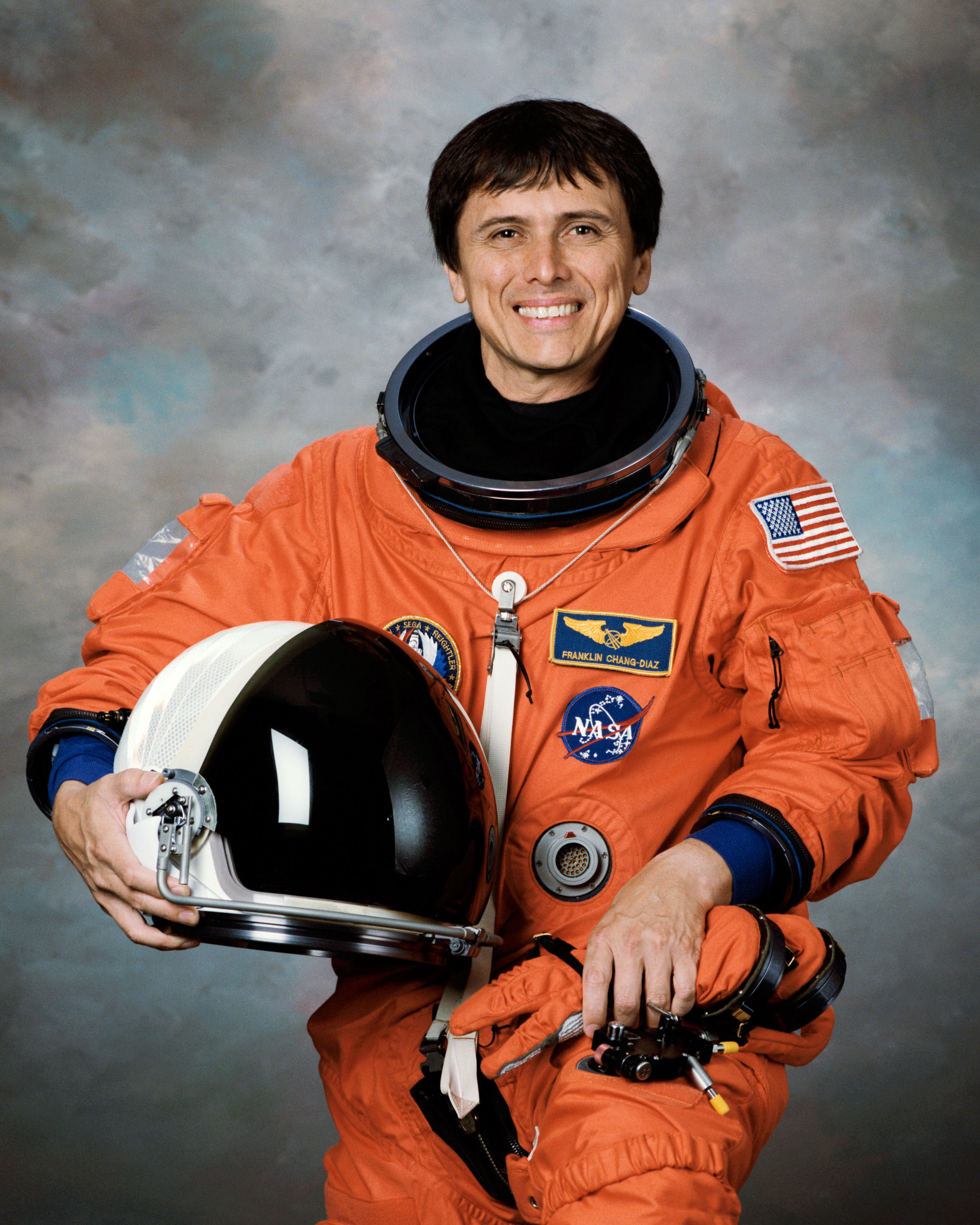
Franklin Chang-Diaz NASA astronaut and physicist known for his expertise in plasma propulsion systems.

Some Hispanics have made their names in astronautics, including several NASA astronauts: Franklin Chang-Diaz, the first Hispanic NASA astronaut, is co-recordholder for the most flights in outer space, and is the leading researcher on the plasma engine for rockets; France A. Córdova, former NASA chief scientist; Juan R. Cruz, NASA aerospace engineer; Lieutenant Carlos I. Noriega, NASA mission specialist and computer scientist; Dr. Orlando Figueroa, mechanical engineer and director of Mars exploration in NASA; Amri Hernández-Pellerano, engineer who designs, builds and tests the electronics that will regulate the solar array power in order to charge the spacecraft battery and distribute power to the different loads or users inside various spacecraft at NASA's Goddard Space Flight Center.

Olga D. González-Sanabria won an R&D 100 Award for her role in the development of the "Long Cycle-Life Nickel-Hydrogen Batteries" which help enable the International Space Station power system. Mercedes Reaves, research engineer and scientist who is responsible for the design of a viable full-scale solar sail and the development and testing of a scale model solar sail at NASA Langley Research Center. Dr. Pedro Rodríguez, inventor and mechanical engineer who is the director of a test laboratory at NASA and of a portable, battery-operated lift seat for people suffering from knee arthritis. Dr. Felix Soto Toro, electrical engineer and astronaut applicant who developed the Advanced Payload Transfer Measurement System (ASPTMS) (Electronic 3D measuring system); Ellen Ochoa, a pioneer of spacecraft technology and astronaut; Joseph Acaba, Fernando Caldeiro, Sidney Gutierrez, José M. Hernández, Michael López-Alegría, John Olivas and George Zamka, who are current or former astronauts.

=== Hispanic and Latino American men in sports ===
==== Football ====
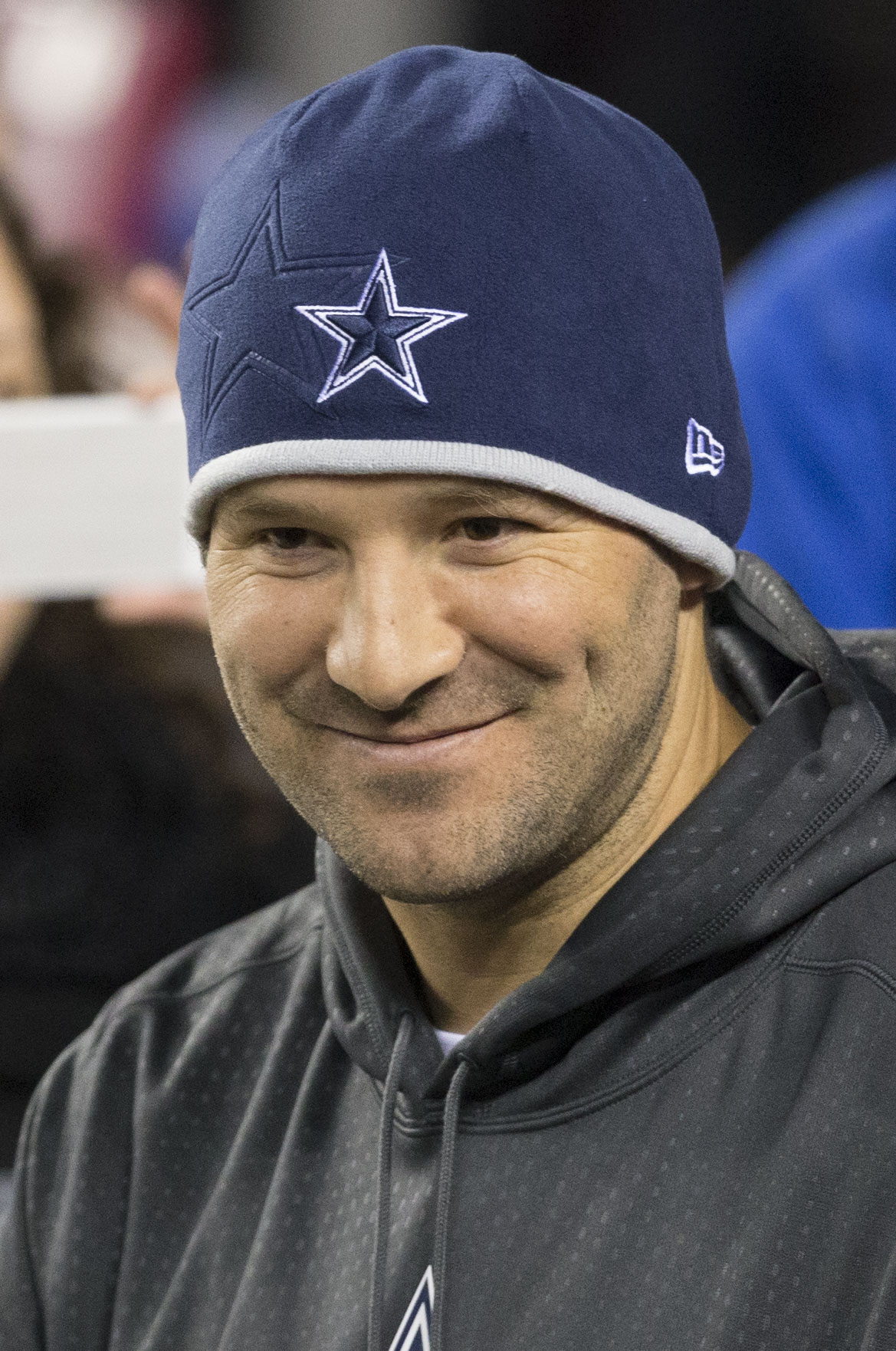
Tony Romo, NFL quarterback known for his career with the Dallas Cowboys and current role as a popular football analyst for CBS Sports.

There have been far fewer football and basketball players, let alone star players, but Tom Flores was the first Hispanic head coach and the first Hispanic quarterback in American professional football, and won Super Bowls as a player, as assistant coach and as head coach for the Oakland Raiders. Anthony Múñoz is enshrined in the Pro Football Hall of Fame, ranked No. 17 on Sporting News's 1999 list of the 100 greatest football players, and was the highest-ranked offensive lineman. Jim Plunkett won the Heisman Trophy and was inducted into the College Football Hall of Fame, and Joe Kapp is inducted into the Canadian Football Hall of Fame and College Football Hall of Fame. Steve Van Buren, Martin Gramatica, Victor Cruz, Tony Gonzalez, Ted Hendricks, Marc Bulger, Tony Romo and Mark Sanchez can also be cited among successful Hispanics in the National Football League (NFL).

==== Baseball ====
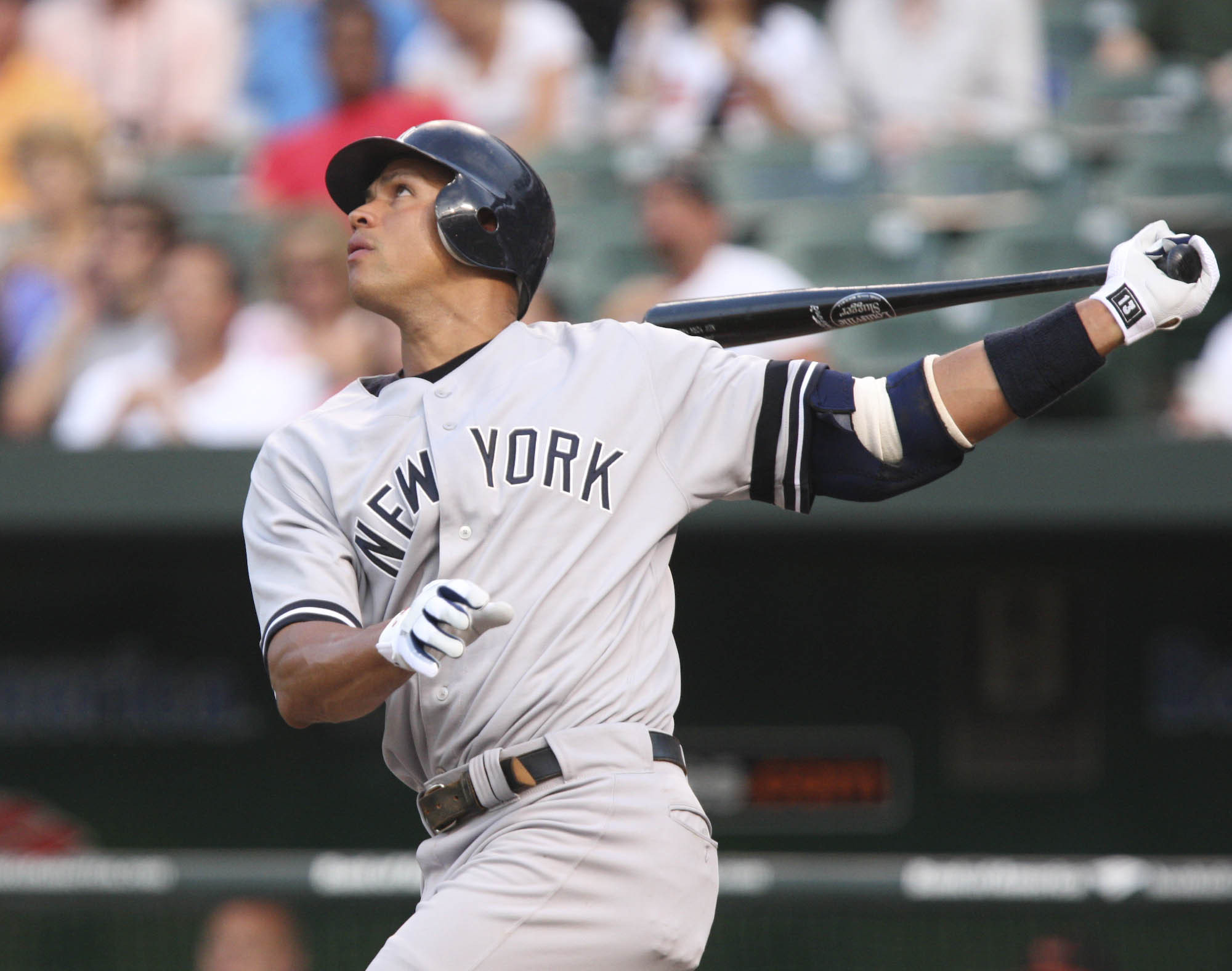
Alex Rodriguez baseball player who achieved iconic status in the MLB, notably with the Seattle Mariners and New York Yankees, before becoming a prominent television analyst.

Hispanics have played in the Major Leagues since the very beginning of organized baseball, with Cuban player Esteban Bellán being the first (1873). The large number of Hispanic American stars in Major League Baseball (MLB) includes players like Ted Williams (considered by many to be the greatest hitter of all time), Sammy Sosa, Alex Rodriguez, Alex Rios, Miguel Cabrera, Lefty Gómez, Adolfo Luque, Iván Rodríguez, Carlos González, Roberto Clemente, Adrián González, Jose Fernandez, David Ortiz, Juan Marichal, Fernando Valenzuela, Nomar Garciaparra, Albert Pujols, Omar Vizquel, managers Miguel Angel Gonzalez (the first Hispanic Major League manager), Al López, Ozzie Guillén and Felipe Alou, and General Manager Omar Minaya. Hispanics in the MLB Hall of Fame include Roberto Alomar, Luis Aparicio, Rod Carew, Orlando Cepeda, Juan Marichal, Pedro Martínez, Tony Pérez, Iván Rodríguez, Ted Williams, Reggie Jackson, Mariano Rivera, Edgar Martinez and Roberto Clemente. Afro-Hispanic players Martin Dihigo, Jose Mendez and Cristóbal Torriente are Hispanic Hall of Famers who played in the Negro leagues.

==== Basketball ====
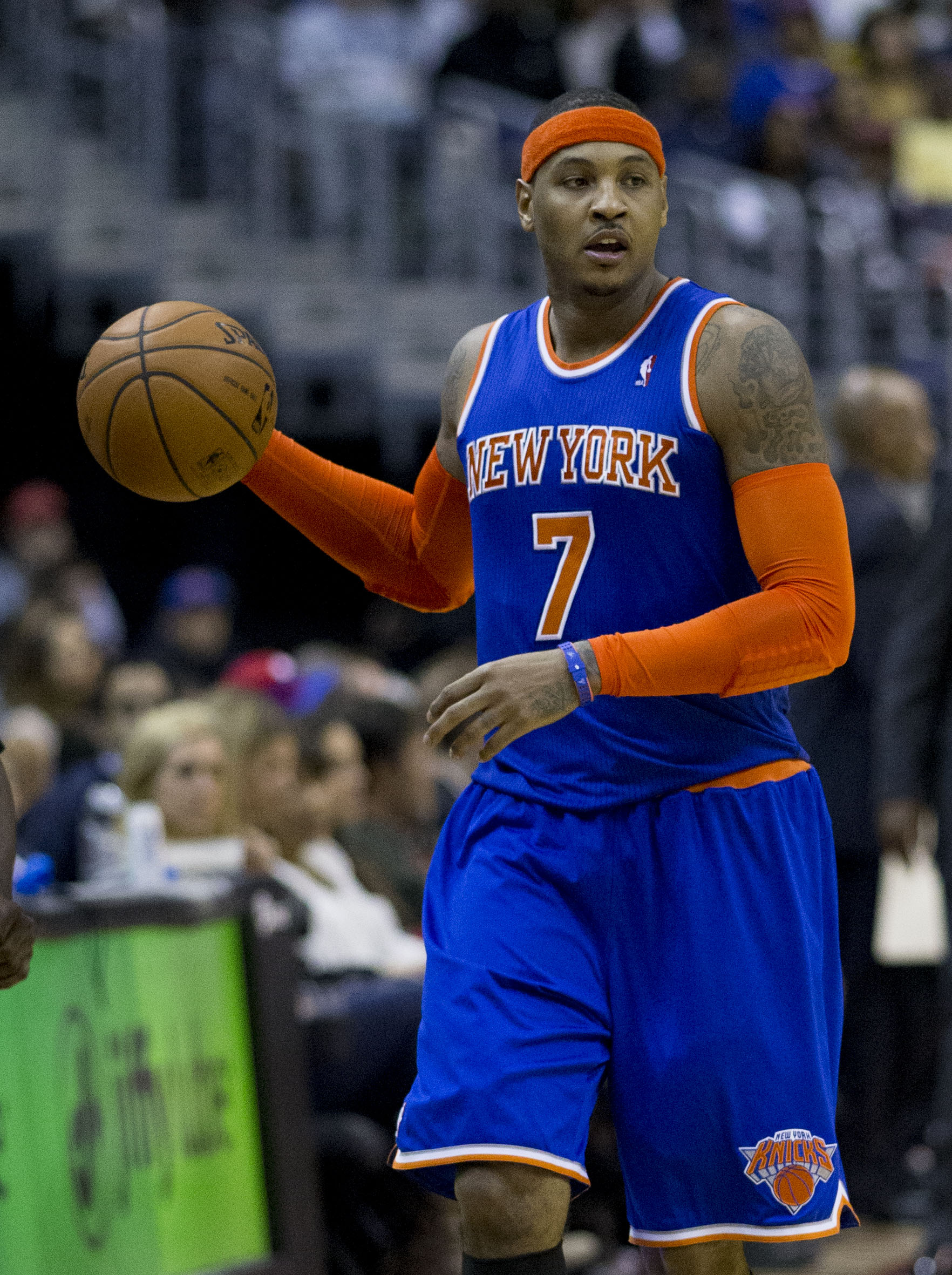
Puerto Rican NBA All-star Carmelo Anthony.

Trevor Ariza, Mark Aguirre, Carmelo Anthony, Manu Ginóbili, Carlos Arroyo, Gilbert Arenas, Rolando Blackman, Pau Gasol, Jose Calderon, José Juan Barea and Charlie Villanueva can be cited in the National Basketball Association (NBA). Dick Versace made history when he became the first person of Hispanic heritage to coach an NBA team. Rebecca Lobo was a major star and champion of collegiate (National Collegiate Athletic Association (NCAA)) and Olympic basketball and played professionally in the Women's National Basketball Association (WNBA). Diana Taurasi became just the seventh player ever to win an NCAA title, a WNBA title and as well an Olympic gold medal. Orlando Antigua became in 1995 the first Hispanic and the first non-Black in 52 years to play for the Harlem Globetrotters.

==== Tennis ====
Notable Hispanic and Latino American tennis players include Pancho Gonzales, as well as Olympic tennis champions Mary Joe Fernández and Gigi Fernández. Monica Puig, a Puerto Rican-born player, achieved significant recognition by winning the gold medal in women's singles at the 2016 Rio Olympics.

==== Soccer ====
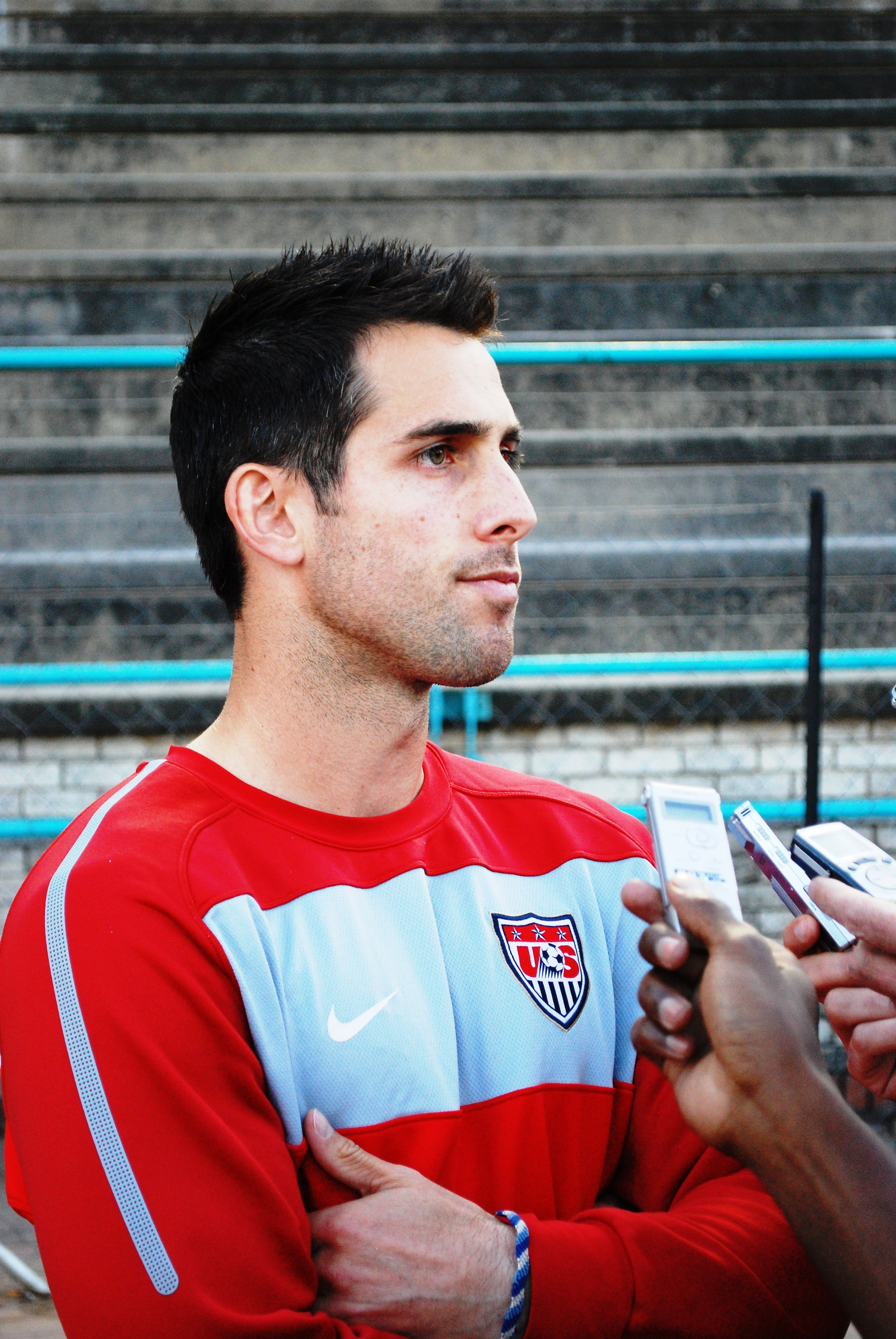
Carlos Bocanegra soccer player who served as the captain of the United States national team and played professionally in Major League Soccer and Europe.

Hispanics have made significant contributions to all major American sports and leagues, with a particular growth of soccer in the United States. Soccer, being the most popular sport in the Spanish-speaking world, has been profoundly influenced by Hispanic heritage. This influence is evident in Major League Soccer (MLS), where teams such as LA Galaxy, Los Angeles FC, Houston Dynamo and Columbus Crew have substantial fan bases comprising primarily Mexican Americans. Notable Hispanic players in MLS include Tab Ramos, Claudio Reyna, Omar Gonzalez, Marcelo Balboa, Roger Espinoza, and Carlos Bocanegra.

==== Swimming ====
Swimmers Ryan Lochte (the second-most decorated swimmer in Olympic history measured by total number of medals) and Dara Torres (one of three women with the most Olympic women's swimming medals), both of Cuban ancestry, have won multiple medals at various Olympic Games over the years. Torres is also the first American swimmer to appear in five Olympic Games. Maya DiRado, of Argentine ancestry, won four medals at the 2016 games, including two gold medals.

==== Other sports ====
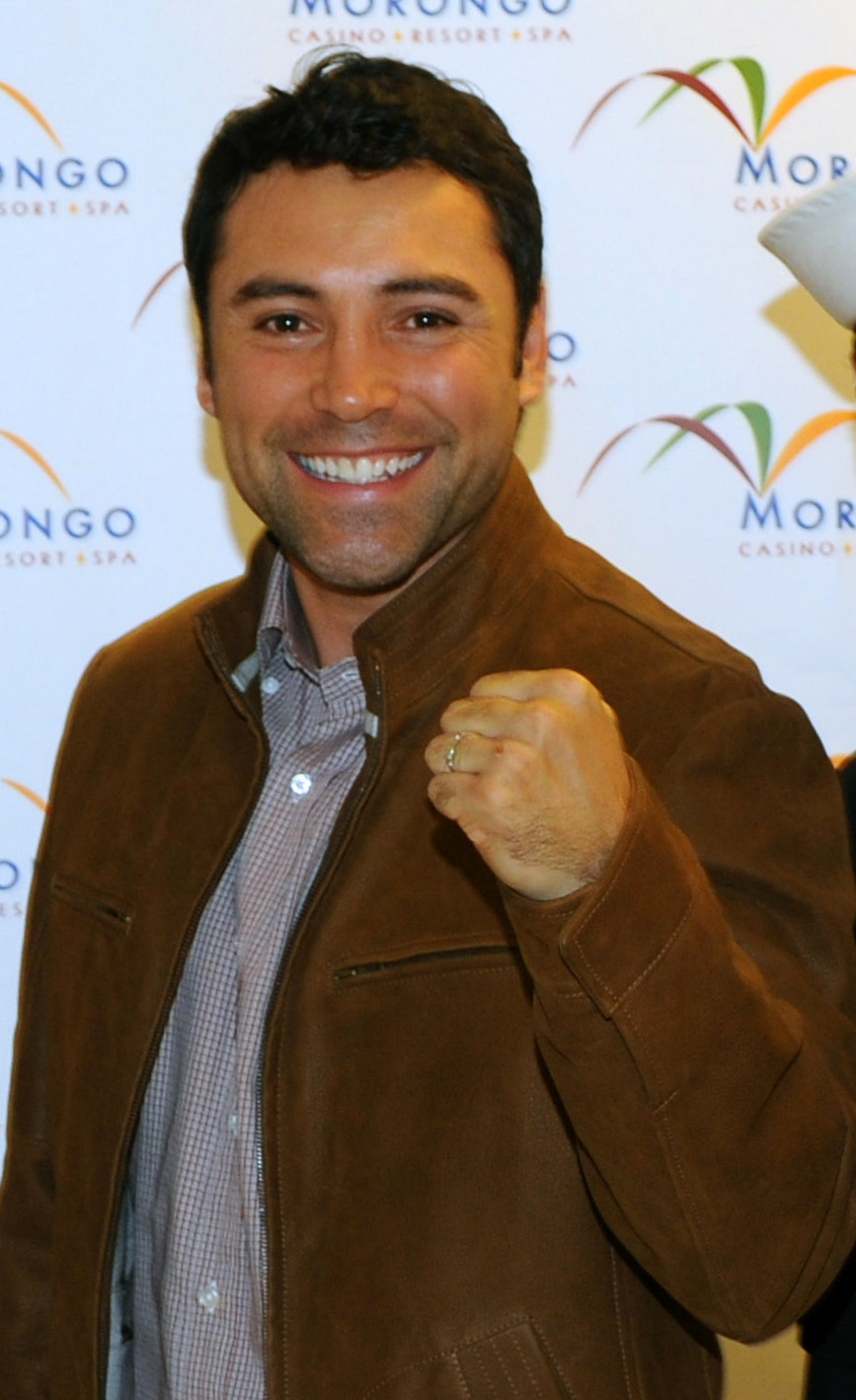
De La Hoya "The Golden Boy," is a former professional boxer and Olympic gold medalist who became a prominent figure in boxing both inside the ring and as a promoter

Boxing's first Hispanic American world champion was Solly Smith. Some other champions include Oscar De La Hoya, Miguel Cotto, Bobby Chacon, Brandon Ríos, Michael Carbajal, John Ruiz, Andy Ruiz Jr. and Mikey Garcia.

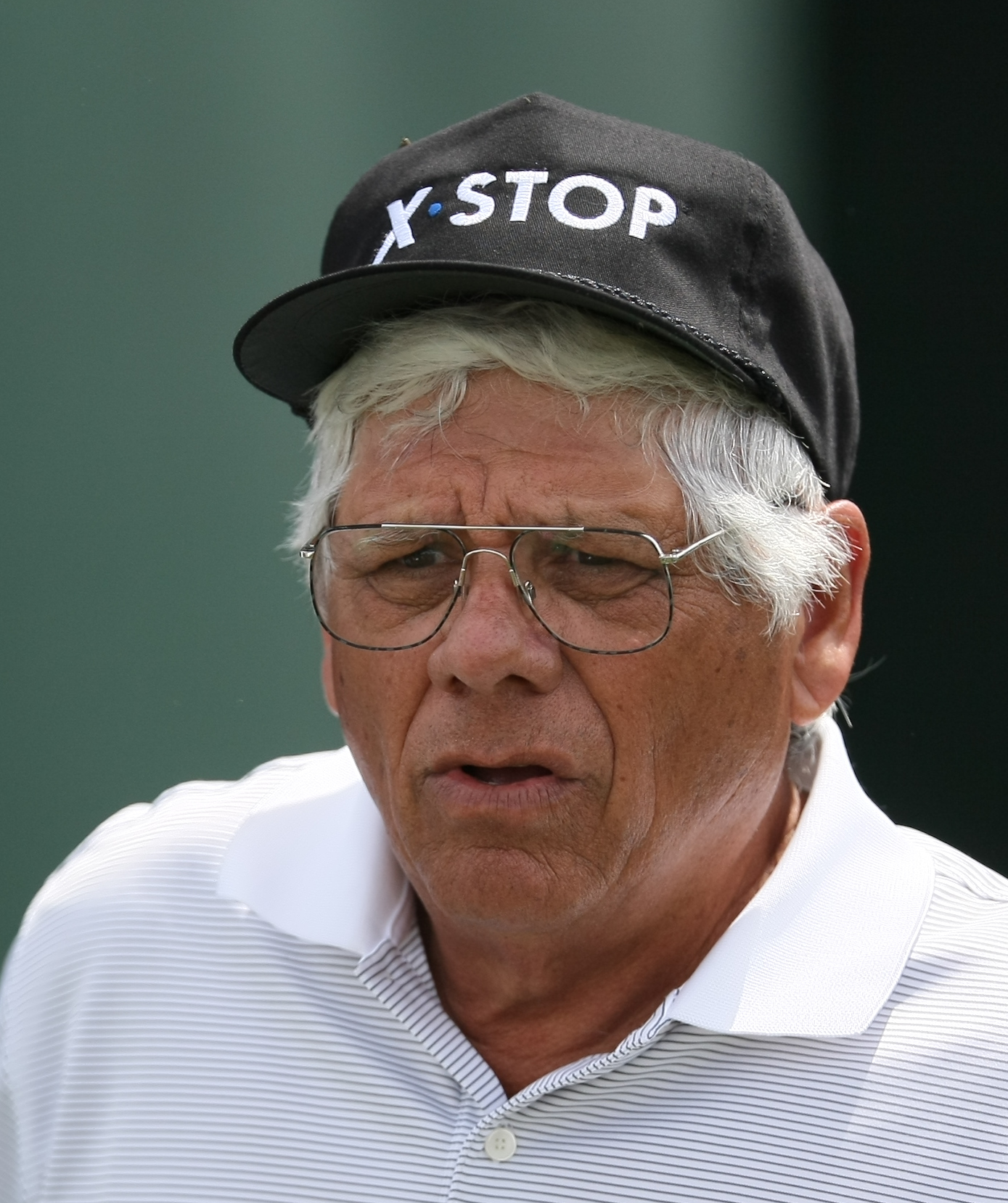
Lee Trevino retired professional golfer who won numerous PGA Tour events, including several major championships

Ricco Rodriguez, Tito Ortiz, Diego Sanchez, Nick Diaz, Nate Diaz, Dominick Cruz, Frank Shamrock, Gilbert Melendez, Roger Huerta, Carlos Condit, Tony Ferguson, Jorge Masvidal, Kelvin Gastelum, Henry Cejudo and UFC Heavy Weight Champion Cain Velasquez have been competitors in the Ultimate Fighting Championship (UFC) of mixed martial arts.

In 1991, Bill Guerin whose mother is Nicaraguan became the first Hispanic player in the National Hockey League (NHL). He was also selected to four NHL All-Star Games. In 1999, Scott Gomez won the NHL Rookie of the Year Award.

Figure skater Rudy Galindo; golfers Chi Chi Rodríguez, Nancy López and Lee Trevino; softball player Lisa Fernández; and Paul Rodríguez Jr., X Games professional skateboarder, are all Hispanic Americans who have distinguished themselves in their sports.

In gymnastics, Laurie Hernandez, who is of Puerto Rican ancestry, was a gold medalist at the 2016 Games.

In rugby, Derek Asbun is of Bolivian ancestry.

Some examples of Hispanics and Latinos in sports entertainment include the professional wrestlers Hulk Hogan, Alberto Del Rio, Rey Mysterio, Eddie Guerrero, Tyler Black and Melina Pérez and executive Vickie Guerrero.

== Anti-Latino sentiment ==
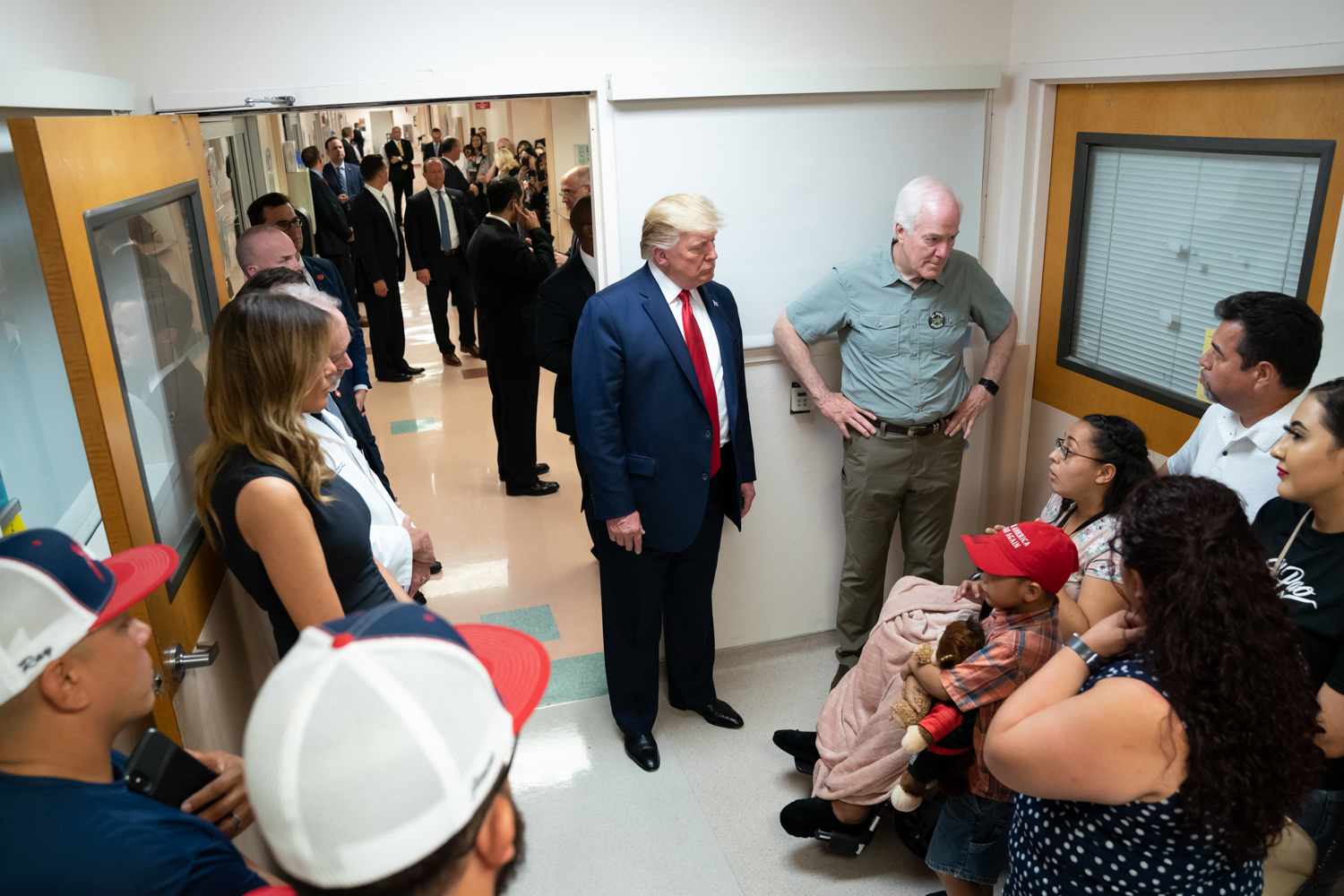
President Trump and Senator John Cornyn while they are visiting survivors of the 2019 El Paso shooting, which was an anti-Latino terrorist attack in El Paso, Texas

In countries where the majority of the population is descended from immigrants, such as the United States, opposition to immigration sometimes takes the forms of nativism, racism, religious intolerance and xenophobia. Throughout US history, anti-Latino sentiment has existed to varying degrees at different times, and it was largely based on ethnicity, race, culture, Anti-Catholicism (see Anti-Catholicism in the United States), xenophobia (see Xenophobia in the United States), economic and social conditions in Hispanic America, and opposition to the use of the Spanish language. In 2006, Time magazine reported that the number of hate groups in the United States increased by 33 percent since 2000, primarily as a result of anti-illegal immigration and anti-Mexican sentiment. According to Federal Bureau of Investigation (FBI) statistics, the number of anti-Hispanic hate crimes increased by 35 percent since 2003 (albeit from a low level). In California, the state with the largest Hispanic population, the number of hate crimes which were committed against Hispanics almost doubled.

In 2009, the FBI reported that 483 of the 6,604 hate crimes which were recorded in the United States were anti-Hispanic, constituting 7.3% of all recorded hate crimes, the highest percentage of all of the hate crimes which were recorded in 2009. This percentage is contrasted by the fact that 34.6% of all of the hate crimes which were recorded in 2009 were anti-Black, 17.9% of them were anti-homosexual, 14.1% of them were anti-Jewish, and 8.3% of them were anti-White.

=== Discrimination ===
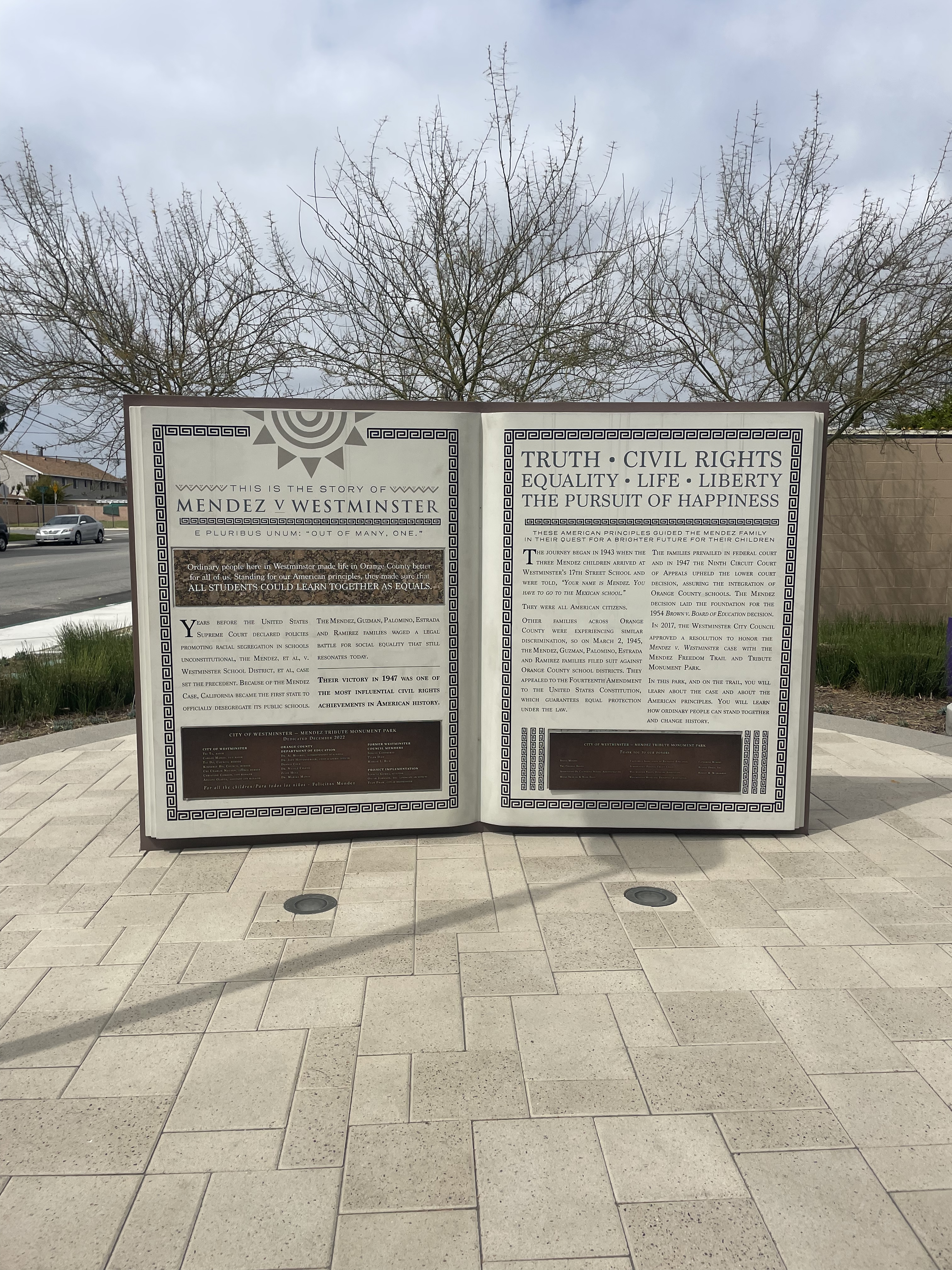
The story of Mendez v. Westminster book monument

It is reported that 31% of Hispanics have reported personal experiences with discrimination whilst 82% of Hispanics believe that discrimination plays a crucial role in whether or not they will find success while they are living in the United States. The current legislation on immigration policies also plays a crucial role in creating a hostile and discriminatory environment for immigrants. In order to measure the discrimination which immigrants are being subjected to, researchers must take into account the immigrants' perception that they are being targeted for discrimination and they must also be aware that instances of discrimination can also vary based on: personal experiences, social attitudes and ethnic group barriers. The immigrant experience is associated with lower self-esteem, internalized symptoms and behavioral problems amongst Mexican youth. It is also known that more time which is spent living in the United States is associated with increased feelings of distress, depression and anxiety. Like many other Hispanic groups that migrate to the United States, these groups are often stigmatized. An example of this stigmatization occurred after 9/11, when people who were considered threats to national security were frequently described with terms like migrant and the "Hispanic Other" along with other terms like refugee and asylum seeker.

== Immigration reform ==
=== 1965: Immigration and Nationality Act (Hart-Celler Act) ===
The Immigration and Nationality Act (INA), enacted in 1952, serves as a foundational piece of US immigration law by consolidating and reorganizing various provisions into a unified framework. Since its enactment, the INA has undergone numerous amendments, reflecting its evolving role in immigration policy. It is codified in Title 8 of the United States Code (USC), which is the comprehensive collection of US laws. Title 8 specifically addresses "Aliens and Nationality," and the INA's sections are aligned with corresponding US Code sections for clarity. For accuracy, the official U.S. Code is provided by the Office of the Law Revision Counsel of the US House of Representatives, with links available through USCIS.

=== 1986: Immigration Reform and Control Act (IRCA) ===
The Immigration Reform and Control Act of 1986 (IRCA), detailed in House Report 99–1000, introduced significant changes to US immigration law. Title I of the Act focused on controlling illegal immigration by making it unlawful for employers to hire or continue employing unauthorized aliens without verifying their work status. It established an employment verification system requiring employers to attest to and maintain records of employees' work eligibility. The Act also set up procedures for monitoring the verification system and addressing violations, while explicitly prohibiting the use of such verification for national identity purposes. Additionally, Title I outlined employer sanctions, including a public education period and a phased enforcement approach. Title II of the Act provided a legalization program for certain undocumented aliens who met specific criteria, including continuous residence in the U.S. since January 1, 1982. It authorized adjustment from temporary to permanent resident status under certain conditions and required the Attorney General to manage and disseminate information about the program. Title III addressed the reform of legal immigration, including provisions for temporary agricultural workers and adjustments to visa programs. The Act also established various commissions and reports to assess and improve immigration policies and enforcement measures.

=== 1996: Illegal Immigration Reform and Immigrant Responsibility Act (IIRIRA) ===
The Illegal Immigration Reform and Immigrant Responsibility Act of 1996 expanded the definition of "qualified alien" under section 431 of the Personal Responsibility and Work Opportunity Act of 1996 (8 USC 1641) to include certain categories of battered aliens. The new provisions added to 8 USC 1641 recognize battered aliens. Those who have experienced battery or extreme cruelty by a spouse or parent, or by a member of their family residing with them. As eligible for benefits if there is a substantial connection between the abuse and the need for assistance. This includes aliens with pending petitions for various statuses under the Immigration and Nationality Act, such as spousal or child status of a US citizen or applications for suspension of deportation. The act extends protections to aliens whose children have been subjected to similar abuse, provided there is no active participation by the alien in the abuse. It also includes alien children who reside with a parent who has been abused. These provisions do not apply if the abuser resides in the same household as the victim. The Attorney General is tasked with issuing guidance on the interpretation of "battery" and "extreme cruelty" and establishing standards for determining the connection between such abuse and the need for benefits.

=== 2012: Deferred Action for Childhood Arrivals (DACA) ===
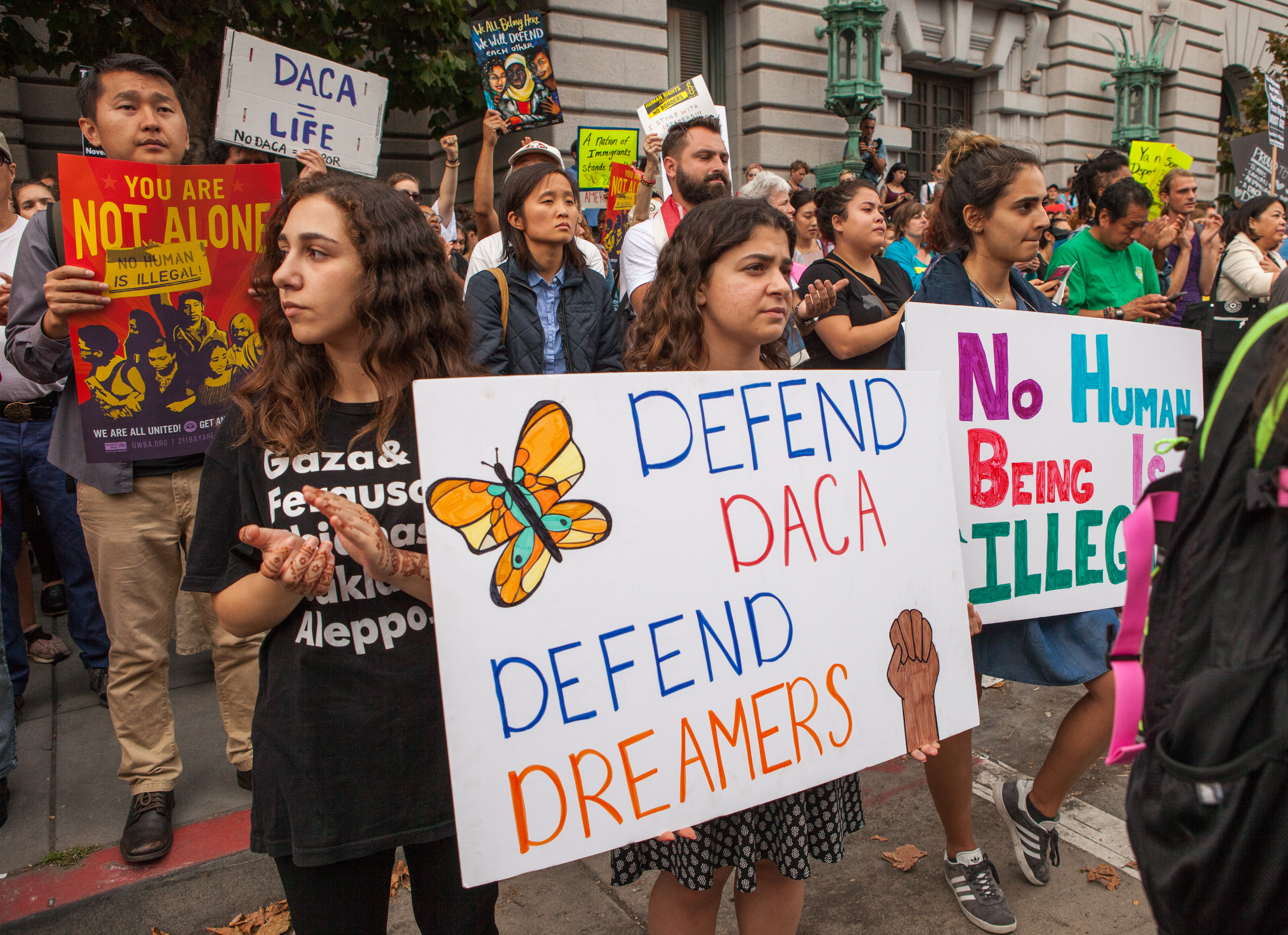
At a Deferred Action for Childhood Arrivals (DACA) rally in San Francisco, protesters displayed a variety of signs and banners advocating for the protection and expansion of the DACA program.

Deferred Action for Childhood Arrivals (DACA), established on June 15, 2012, by then-Secretary of Homeland Security Janet Napolitano, offers temporary relief from deportation and work authorization to certain young undocumented immigrants. Unlike federal legislation, DACA does not grant permanent legal status and requires renewal every two years. Initially benefiting about 832,881 individuals, DACA has facilitated significant socioeconomic improvements, such as higher wages, better job conditions, and increased educational opportunities. A 2019 survey revealed an 86 percent rise in the average hourly wage of DACA recipients, enhanced financial independence, and positive economic impacts like increased consumer spending.

DACA's future has faced legal challenges, including a 2020 Supreme Court ruling that blocked the Trump administration's attempt to end it and a 2021 decision declaring DACA unlawful, though it did not immediately affect current recipients. The Biden administration has since reaffirmed its support and proposed regulatory changes to secure the program's future.

== See also ==
Places of settlement in United States:

- Hispanics and Latinos in Arizona
- Hispanics and Latinos in California
- Hispanics and Latinos in Florida
- Hispanics and Latinos in Massachusetts
- Hispanics and Latinos in Nevada
- Hispanics and Latinos in New Jersey
- Hispanics and Latinos in New Mexico
- Hispanics and Latinos in New York
- Hispanics and Latinos in Texas
- Hispanics and Latinos in Washington, D.C.
- List of U.S. cities by Spanish-speaking population
- List of U.S. cities with large Hispanic and Latino populations
- List of U.S. communities with Hispanic- or Latino-majority in the 2010 census

Diaspora:

- Hispanics
  - Hispanic and Latin American Australians
  - Hispanic and Latin American Canadians
  - Latin Americans in the United Kingdom
- Hispanidad
- Latino diaspora
- Latin American Asian
- Latin Americans in Europe

Individuals:

- List of Hispanic and Latino Americans
  - Hispanics and Latinos in the American Civil War
  - Hispanic and Latino Americans in World War II
  - Hispanics and Latinos in the United States Air Force
  - Hispanics and Latinos in the United States Coast Guard
  - Hispanics and Latinos in the United States Marine Corps
  - Hispanics and Latinos in the United States Navy
    - Hispanic and Latino Admirals in the United States Navy
    - Hispanics and Latinos in the United States Naval Academy

Other Hispanic and Latino Americans topics:

- Black Hispanic Americans
- Hispanic and Latino American Muslims
- Latin America–United States relations
- List of Latin American Jews
- National Alliance for Hispanic Health
- Portugal–United States relations
- Spain–United States relations
- White Hispanic Americans
- List of U.S. place names of Spanish origin
- Latino National Survey, 2006
- Latino literature
- Chicano movement
- Territories of the United States
- Tequila Party
- Puerto Rico statehood movement
- Latina lesbian organizations in the United States
- Immigration of Latina women to the United States

General:

- Race and ethnicity in the United States census
- Demographics of the United States
- Historical racial and ethnic demographics of the United States
  - Immigration to the United States
  - History of immigration to the United States
  - Illegal immigration to the United States
