= List of people from Riverside, California =

This is a list of notable past and present residents of the U.S. city of Riverside, California, and its surrounding metropolitan area. For people whose only connection with the city is attending the University of California, Riverside, see: List of University of California, Riverside people.

== Arts ==
- Marsia Alexander-Clarke, artist
- El Daña, drag king
- Joshua Jennifer Espinoza, poet
- Darci Kistler, ballerina
- Don O'Neill, architect and water color artist
- Nik Williams, photographer
- Perry Picasshoe, visual artist
- Joseph J. Sherman, marketing strategist and artist
- Peter J. Weber, architect
- Alan Yang, screenwriter, producer and director

== Athletics ==
- Truly Adams, racing driver
- Hakim Akbar, football player
- Chris Arreola, professional heavyweight boxer
- Dusty Baker, baseball player for Los Angeles Dodgers and manager of Washington Nationals, Cincinnati Reds, Chicago Cubs, San Francisco Giants and Houston Astros.
- Austin Barnes, baseball player for Los Angeles Dodgers
- Kenjon Barner, football player; 3x Super Bowl Champion
- Monique Billings, WNBA basketball player for the Atlanta Dream
- Barry Bonds, baseball player for San Francisco Giants and Pittsburgh Pirates, 14-time All-Star, MLB's all-time home run leader
- Bobby Bonds, baseball player for San Francisco Giants and California Angels, 3-time All-Star
- Sean Brewer, football player for Cincinnati Bengals and Atlanta Falcons
- Carlon Brown, basketball player, 2013–14 top scorer in the Israel Basketball Premier League
- Orshawante Bryant, arena football player
- Chris Claiborne, football player for New York Giants
- Tyler Clary, Olympic gold medalist at 2012 London Olympics in 200-meter backstroke
- Frank Corral, football kicker for Los Angeles Rams
- Allen Cunningham, professional poker player
- Alvin Davis, baseball player for Seattle Mariners
- Coby Dietrick, pro basketball player
- Walker Evans, Off-road Motorsports Hall of Fame
- Bubba Franks, NFL tight end for Green Bay Packers
- Candice LeRae, professional wrestler
- David Gilliland, NASCAR driver for Front Row Motorsports
- Maxwell Griffin, soccer player
- Dan Gurney, first driver to win in four major categories of motorsports: Grand Prix, Indy Car, NASCAR and Sports Car
- Connor Hamlett, football player
- Kevin Holland – mixed martial artist
- Ken Hubbs, baseball player for Chicago Cubs
- Reed Johnson, baseball player for seven MLB teams
- Adam Kennedy, baseball player for Los Angeles Angels of Anaheim and St. Louis Cardinals
- Bobby Kielty, baseball player for several MLB teams
- Alex Lange, professional baseball pitcher for The Detroit Tigers
- Sammy Knight, football player for New Orleans Saints, Miami Dolphins, and New York Giants
- Lorenz Larkin, mixed martial artist competing at welterweight in the UFC
- Kawhi Leonard, professional basketball player for Los Angeles Clippers, MVP of 2014 NBA Finals
- Jake Marisnick, professional baseball player for Houston Astros.
- Chad Marshall, Major League Soccer player for Columbus Crew
- Chief Meyers, baseball player in early 20th Century
- Cheryl Miller, pro basketball Hall of Famer, player, coach and television commentator, Olympic gold medalist
- Reggie Miller, pro basketball Hall of Famer, played for Indiana Pacers, Olympic gold medalist
- Stephen Murray, BMX rider
- Ryan Navarro, American football long snapper
- Nick Neugebauer, baseball player for Milwaukee Brewers
- Bruce Ogilvie, AMA Hall of Famer, 4-time Baja winner
- Bill Parsons, baseball player for Milwaukee Brewers and Oakland Athletics
- Troy Percival, baseball pitcher for Anaheim Angels and Tampa Bay Rays and 2002 World Series champion
- Garrett Richards, baseball pitcher for the San Diego Padres
- Ronda Rousey, professional wrestler, former mixed martial artist, former UFC bantamweight champion
- Bob Rule, basketball player, NBA All-Star
- Hannah Seabert, soccer player
- Eric Show, baseball pitcher for San Diego Padres
- Malcolm Smith, Motorcycle Hall Of Fame inductee, star of On Any Sunday
- Tony Snell, basketball player
- Tiffany van Soest, kickboxer
- Daniel Sorensen, professional football player for the New Orleans Saints
- Tyree Washington, track-and-field athlete
- Jacob Webb, MLB pitcher
- Josh Wise, NASCAR driver for Premium Motorsports
- Cynthia Woodhead (nicknamed "Sippy"), Olympic medalist swimmer and world record holder

== Literature ==
- Joshua Jennifer Espinoza, poet
- Bradley Garrett, writer
- Barbara Hambly, novelist
- Laurie McBain, romance novelist
- Susan Straight, novelist, National Book Award nominee

== Military ==
- Mark Edward Bradley (1907–1999), U.S. Air Force pilot and general. Died in Riverside.
- Jesus S. Duran, Vietnam War Medal of Honor recipient
- Salvador J. Lara, World War II Medal of Honor recipient
- John N. Lotz, Air National Guard Brigadier General
- Frank Raab (1921–2016), U.S. Navy Reserve Rear Admiral
- Hoyt S. Vandenberg, Jr., U.S. Air Force Major General
- Ysmael R. Villegas (1924–1945), first Medal of Honor recipient from Riverside County, California, now buried at Riverside National Cemetery as the cemetery's first interment.
- Robert F. Worley, (1919–1968), U.S. Air Force Major General and fighter pilot.

== Movies/television/media ==
- Steve Agee, actor, former writer for Jimmy Kimmel Live!
- Ahmed Ahmed, Egyptian comedian and actor
- Jaye Davidson, Oscar-nominated actor
- Elsie Fisher, actress famous for voice of Agnes in Despicable Me.
- Richard Genelle, actor, best known as Ernie of Mighty Morphin Power Rangers and Power Rangers Zeo
- Ciara Hanna, actress (Power Rangers Megaforce)
- Solomon Hughes, actor (Winning Time )
- Don Imus, nationally syndicated radio talk host
- Sharon Jordan, actress (The Suite Life of Zack & Cody)
- J. F. Lawton, screenwriter (Pretty Woman), director and producer
- Kellie Martin, actress (Mystery Woman)
- Natalie Osman, professional wrestler and valet
- David Petruschin (Raven), drag artist and reality TV star
- Scarlett Pomers, actress (Star Trek: Voyager, Reba)
- Lindsay Ridgeway, actress (Boy Meets World)
- Patrick Seitz, voice actor, (Bleach)
- Alia Shawkat, actress, (Arrested Development)
- Martin Smith, documentarian, journalist, producer, director. Especially known for his work on the PBS Frontline program.
- Johnny Taylor, Jr., stand-up comedian
- Brendon Villegas, competitor on Big Brother 12 and Big Brother 13
- Garrett Wang, actor (Star Trek: Voyager)
- Bert Williams, popular vaudeville entertainer, first black American to take a lead role on the Broadway stage
- Alan Yang, screenwriter, Parks and Recreation, Last Call with Carson Daly, South Park

== Music ==
- Alien Ant Farm, rock band known for their popular cover of the Michael Jackson song "Smooth Criminal".
- Assorted Jelly Beans, ska punk/punk rock band
- Richard Shaw Brown, lead singer with Riverside rock-band The Misunderstood, gemologist, designer and author
- Celestaphone, hip hop producer
- Iván Cornejo, regional Mexican singer
- Marcella Craft, operatic soprano
- Elysia Crampton, electronic musician
- Marc Danzeisen, musician, producer, actor, known for Brady Bunch Movie, and contributions to Def Leppard's music and Gilby Clarke's Pawnshop Guitars
- Tony Harmon, classical guitarist
- Twyla Herbert, songwriter
- Etta James, singer, Blues Hall of Fame, Grammy Lifetime Award
- Amy Lee, singer (Evanescence)
- DJ Trevi, DJ, Producer, songwriter, and reality star personality.
- Amy Leverenz, soprano
- A Lighter Shade of Brown, hip-hop duo
- Mitch Lucker, former vocalist of deathcore band Suicide Silence
- Jason Martin, musician (Starflyer 59, Neon Horse, The Brothers Martin, Bon Voyage)
- T. Mills, pop artist, rapper
- Heather Myles, country singer
- Rod Piazza, blues harmonica player
- Gabriel Roth, aka Bosco Mann, composer, bandleader, producer Sharon Jones & the Dap-Kings; co-founder of Daptone Records
- Drew Shirley, member of band Switchfoot
- Skee-Lo, rapper known for hit song "I Wish"
- Billy Vera (born William McCord), singer and actor, best known as frontman of Billy and the Beaters
- Voodoo Glow Skulls, ska punk band formed in 1988
- Michael Wittig, aka "Kalel" the bass player for hard rock band Pillar

== Politics ==
- Stephen W. Cunningham, first UCLA graduate manager, Los Angeles City Council member, 1933–41
- Duncan L. Hunter, U.S. representative for California
- Mark Takano, U.S. representative for California
- Ray Lyman Wilbur, president of Stanford University, U.S. Secretary of the Interior

== Miscellaneous ==
- Larry Christiansen, chess Grandmaster
- Joshua Gil, restaurateur
- Edmund C. Hinde, gold miner during the California Gold Rush
- Phil Ivey, professional poker player
- Edmund Jaeger, biologist, instructor at Riverside City College for 30 years
- Trisha Paytas, YouTube
- Rizwan Farook, health inspector and criminal
