= Don O'Neill =

Don O'Neill may refer to:

- Don O'Neill (artist)
- Don O'Neill (fashion designer)
