= Casa Blanca, California =

- Neighborhood of Riverside; Former unincorporated community
- Location in California
- Coordinates: 33°55′59″N 117°24′09″W
- Country: United States
- State: California
- County: Riverside County
- City: Riverside
- Elevation: 866 ft (264 m)

Casa Blanca (Spanish for "White House") is a former unincorporated community now an annexed neighborhood of Riverside, in Riverside County, California. It lies at an elevation of 866 feet (264 m). Casa Blanca is located 4 miles (6.4 km) south-southwest of downtown Riverside.

== Notable residents ==
- Ysmael R. Villegas (1924–1945) – First Medal of Honor named recipient from Riverside County, California, now buried at Riverside National Cemetery as the cemetery's first interment.
- Salvador J. Lara (1920–1945) - Awarded Medal of Honor on March 18, 2014 by President Obama (One of Valor 24). Then-Pfc. Salvador Lara (US Army) was bestowed the Medal of Honor to recognize his valorous actions in Aprilia, Italy, May 27–28, 1944 (WW II). During the fight, May 27, he aggressively led his rifle squad in neutralizing multiple enemy strong points and inflicting large numbers of casualties on the enemy. The next morning, as his company resumed the attack, Lara sustained a severe leg wound, but did not stop to receive first aid. Lara continued his exemplary performance until he captured his objective. Lara's burial monument is located at Plot F Row 17 Grave 33 of the Lorraine American Cemetery and Memorial in Saint-Avold, Moselle, France, a site administered by the American Battle Monuments Commission.
