= American Latinas in World War II =

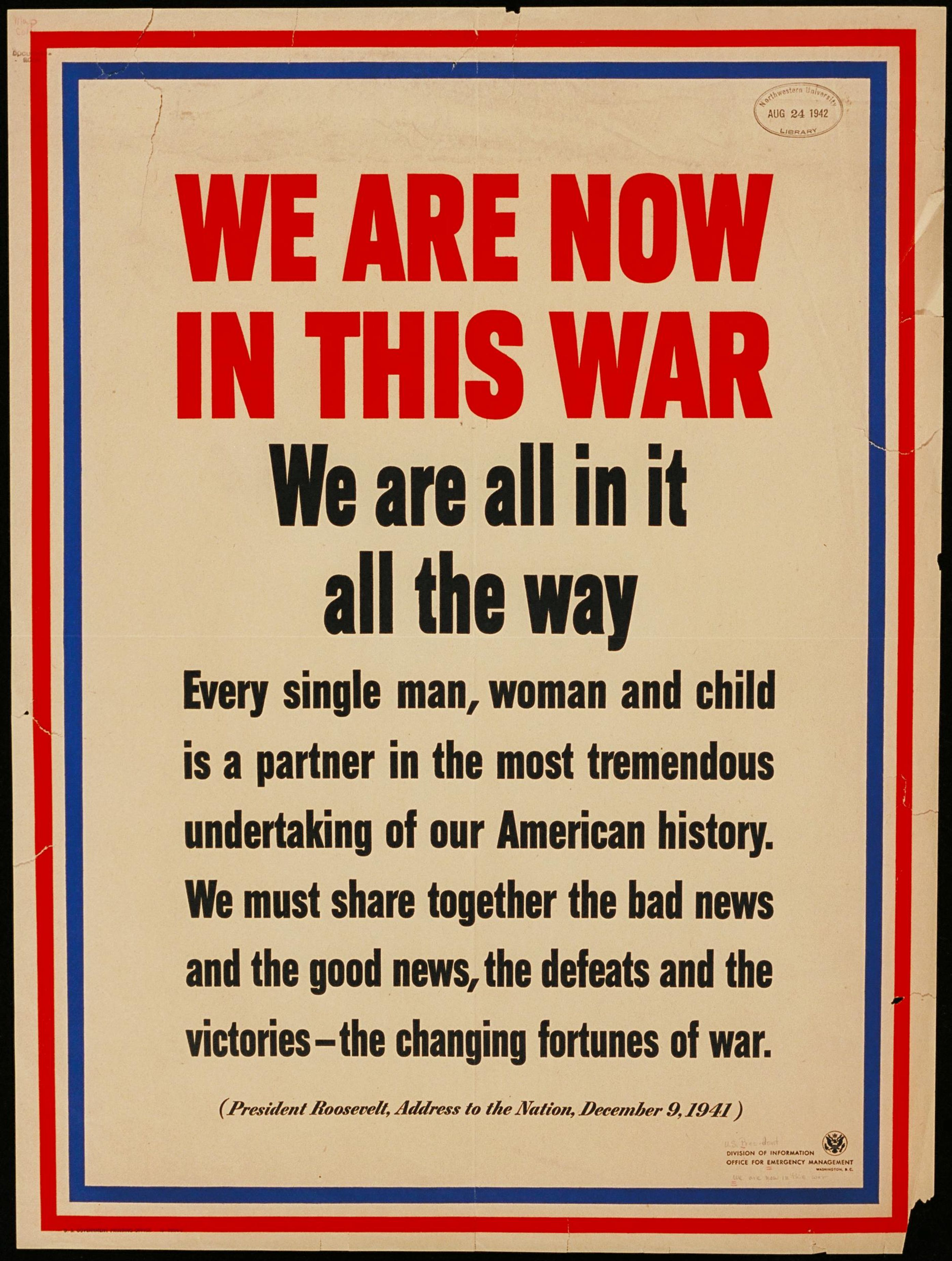
A U.S. World War II poster calls for all members of American society to contribute to the war effort.

American women of Spanish and Latin American descent, also known as Latinas, contributed to the United States' efforts in World War II both overseas and on the Homefront.

== Before the war ==
In the aftermath of World War I, countries of Europe were left in debt from the war, inflation started to rise, and the United States suffered from the Great Depression. The United States opposed the fascist regimes that were gaining ground around the world, but it was not until 1941 that the U.S. entered into the war. In reaction to the December 7 attack on Pearl Harbor, the American public overwhelmingly supported military involvement and Congress declared war on Japan on December 8, 1941.

=== Latinos in the U.S. ===
American men and women of Latin American or Spanish descent had served in World War I and promoted the efforts of the United States. While many Latinos joined the military to serve their country, evidence shows that discrimination remained a common experience.

Herbert Hoover claimed that undocumented Latinos were a contributing factor for high unemployment rates during the Great Depression. In response to demands from organized labor, Secretary of Labor William Doaks reinvigorated the Immigration and Naturalization Service, advocating the use of random raids to apprehend undocumented persons and/or those unable to prove citizenship for repatriation outside the U.S.

Political rhetoric to otherize Latinos helped in the spread of stereotypes and contributed to discriminatory notions that Latinos were merely "part of the landscape, supporting actors in a drama that purported only to affect them, not to be affected by them." This inaccurate characterization that Latino Americans were not active contributors in the World War I effort, and mainstream society in general, was not based on societal stereotypes. It was common for Latinos to experience racial discrimination and unfair treatment in much of this time period.

Latinas were also treated unfairly on the basis of sex, like most American women in that time, including forms of sex discrimination particular to Latino communities. Nonetheless, some Latinas sought opportunities to support their country during World War II.

== Latinas at war ==
=== Life overseas ===
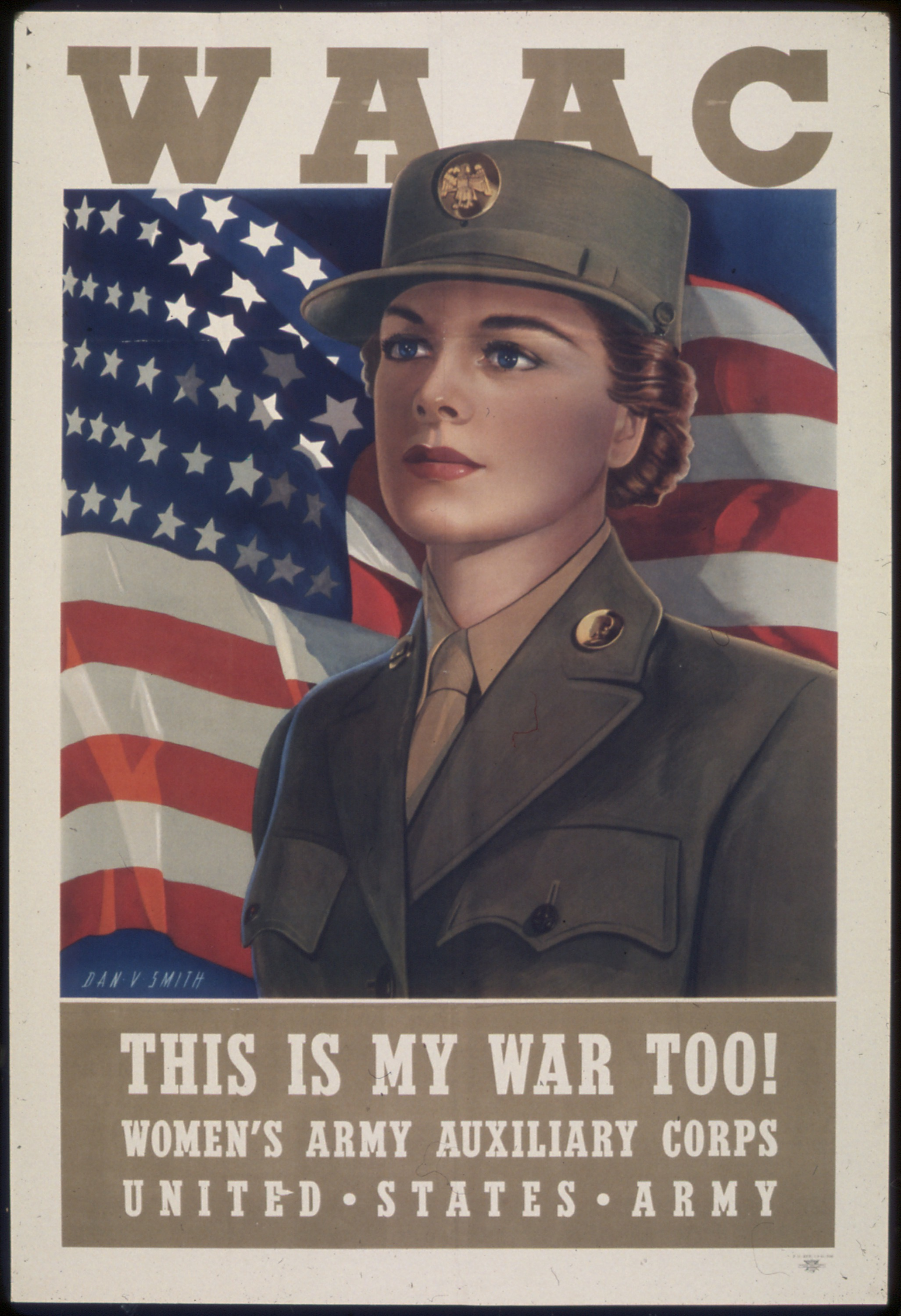
A poster for the Women's Army Auxiliary Corps, 1941.

The contributions of Latinas throughout the war were notable and courageous.

During World War II, the Women's Army Corps and the Women's Army Auxiliary Corps were created alongside the existing Army Nurse Corps. This gave women the chance to work not only as nurses, but as uniformed members of the armed forces. Due to their fluency in the Spanish language, Latina women were even sought out for positions as "cryptologists and in correspondence and communications."

Members of the Women's Army Auxiliary Corps were not protected by the same international laws as prisoners of war. Furthermore, they were not granted the same benefits as their male counterparts. Latinas commonly faced discrimination on the basis of sex and/or race while overseas and within their respective units.

However, overseas employment opportunities during this period provided new options for some Latina women who had not previously received formal trade training. For many, this represented their first employment outside the home and provided experience that could contribute to later opportunities in technical fields.

Women worked in positions such as nurses, technical agents, mechanics, and telegram operators overseas. In these positions, women gained new skills and a sense of "personal freedom" achieved by leaving their towns and communities. This increased their individual agency and set them up for success upon returning home.

=== Returning home ===
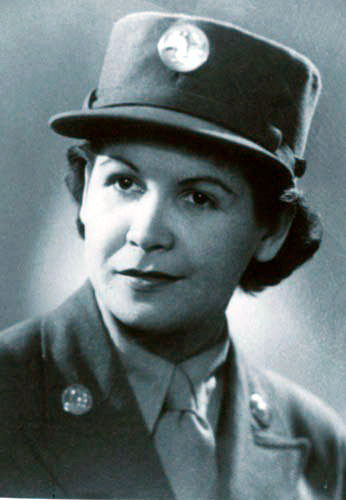
Carmen Contreras-Bozak, a member of the Women's Army corps during World War II.

While women were a vital part of the military's success, they did not always receive recognition. This disparity is even greater when looking at the recognition of Latina Women in the armed forces and their work as nurses overseas.

As Latina service women returned to the United States, many expected to be welcomed as heroes who had served their country, but were disappointed to realize their participation in World War II did little to change the perception of Latinas in the eyes of much of the American public at the time. Many felt that they were seen as second class citizens or foreigners.

Within their local communities, many women who had served in the armed forces or as nurses used their experiences as a springboard to jumpstart their educational or career goals. Women entered the workforce in greater numbers after World War II. Their military service frequently enabled them to bypass many of the previous cultural norms surrounding women's roles in and outside of the home.

Re-acclimation to post-war life for Latinas was sometimes difficult in part due to government policies which specifically excluded female service members from the benefits given to their male counterparts. While it was common for Latino males to experience discrimination based on race, male soldiers received legislated benefits which enabled them greater ability to go to college and buy homes.

Like many American women who served overseas, Latinas sometimes encountered underlying social tension and judgement as being "drinkers and smokers" or morally dubious by more conservative communities.

== Latinas on the home front ==
=== Agriculture ===
One of the biggest sources of agricultural jobs for Mexicans in the United States during World War II was the Bracero Program, a temporary work agreement between the U.S. and Mexico through which workers would enter the United States for a certain amount of time, and then return to Mexico. Women were not included in the Bracero Program, yet it still had a profound effect on Latinas who raised their family as a single caretaker back in Mexico. In some cases, women in Mexico began taking more decision-making roles and participating more heavily in their family businesses while their husbands were away. Because it took a long time for funds from the Bracero Program to actually be sent back to Mexico, some Latinas chose undocumented migration into the U.S.

=== Industry ===
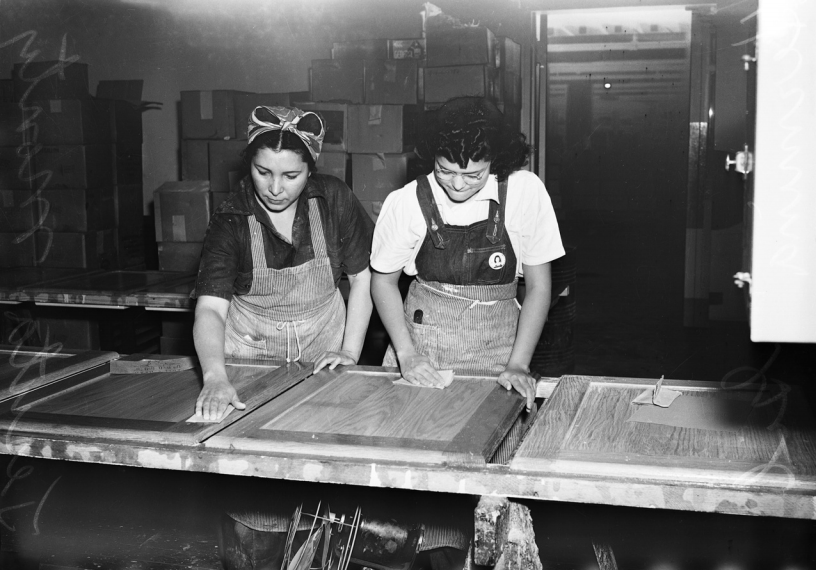
Mexican American women working at Friedrich Refrigeration

With the U.S. joining the war, the demand for labor increased significantly to support defense production, yet availability of male labor decreased as men volunteered for war. This dynamic resulted in women increasingly adopting industry-based jobs, as exemplified by the iconic Rosie the Riveter.

Like other American women, Latinas started to fill the positions left behind by men, helping these factories produce parts for weapons, ships, or aircraft. One example of many is The Friedrich Refrigeration Company in San Antonio, Texas, which was contracted to make parts for bombs where much of the company's workforce consisted of Mexican-American women.

Latinas became a big part of the workforce in the garment industry, including the manufacture of uniforms. In some cases, sweatshops sought to hire Latinas as very low-wage workers. For some time after World War II, the garment industry would continue to relocate to lower-wage areas, seeking Latina women in need of work.

=== Societal effects ===
For American Latinas during World War II, the transition from domestic life into working life, or from less intensive jobs into higher intensity positions, had major societal effects. Women in industrial jobs experienced an increasing a relaxation of previously rigid expectations of gender roles. The shift in work meant women were acquiring new skills, aiding in the changing societal gender norms.

These new jobs sometimes required new attire, such as coveralls, overalls, pants, and big heavy shoes, none of which would have been seen as women's attire prior to this shift of women into industry. In many Latino communities, the image of Rosie the Riveter was widely seen as representing American women of many ethnicities as the majority of women who embodied the "denim-clad, tool-wielding, can-do figure" were not white women, but rather women of color.

Latina women also took part in the Pachuca and Zoot Suit culture of World War II. The women's participation in this, as feminizing the zoot suit to fit their needs, showcased the newfound mobility and agency gained from the War. The female zoot suiters were bold, knowing that they were challenging gender norms. They were excluded from history for their failure to fit the masculine profile, however the women pachucas can be seen as a symbol of independence.

== Aftermath ==
As servicemen returned home from World War II, employment opportunities for women and especially women of color decreased. Post-war reconversion efforts lead to job losses for American women, often followed by intense social pressures for women to return to previous norms of domestic focus. With the economy shifting from wartime to peace, many war-related industries reduced production and employment.

Attitudes towards the layoffs were mixed. Some Latinas were happy to return home to their children and families. Others chose to turn to desk jobs that were considered more "womanly" and less labor-intensive. A smaller portion wanted to stay in their previous jobs and some managed to do so.

Latina women felt a strong sense of patriotism while working in war-related industries. Options to fight discrimination practices diminished as Truman disbanded the Office of War Information and Office of the Coordinator of the Inter-American Affairs.

== See also ==
- Hispanic Americans in World War II
- Women in World War II
