= Luis de Florez =

United States Navy admiral

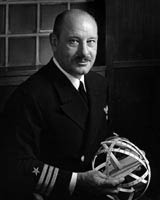
- Commander Luis de Florez
- Born: March 4, 1889; New York City, New York, U.S.
- Died: November 1962 (aged 73); Connecticut, U.S.
- Military career
- Allegiance: United States
- Branch: United States Navy
- Rank: Rear Admiral
- Conflicts: World War I World War II
- Awards: Legion of Merit

Luis de Florez (March 4, 1889 − November 1962) was a naval aviator and a Rear Admiral in the United States Navy that was actively involved in experimental aerospace development projects for the United States Government. As both an active duty and a retired U.S. Navy admiral, de Florez was influential in the development of early flight simulators, and was a pioneer in the use of "virtual reality" to simulate flight and combat situations in World War II.

== Biography ==
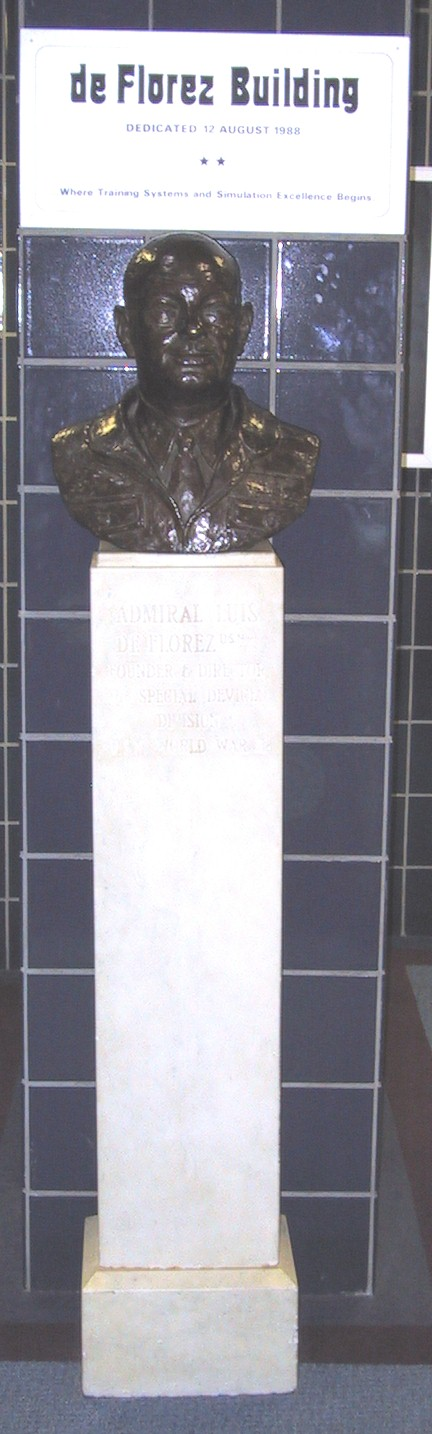
Bust of Luis de Florez at the Naval Air Warfare Center Training Systems Division in Orlando, Florida

Luis de Florez was from New York City. De Florez attended MIT, and graduated in 1911 with a B.S. in Mechanical Engineering. He wrote his thesis on the subject of an aircraft problem, titled "Thrust of Propellers in Flight." The Admiral de Florez Design and Innovation Award is named after him, and his son, Peter de Florez, who was an MIT professor, established a $500,000 fund to foster and encourage activities related to humor at MIT. Other awards at the university include the MIT Mechanical Engineering De Florez Award and Admiral Luis de Florez Prize for Original Thinking and Ingenuity. The American Institute for Aeronautics and Astronautics (AIAA) presents the de Florez Award for Flight Simulation annually for "outstanding individual achievement in the application of flight simulation to aerospace training, research, and development."

De Florez worked in the United States Navy as a career officer in World War I. He worked in the aviation section of the Navy and also on the development of refinery technology.

In the 1930s, De Florez also worked as an engineering consultant for various oil companies. His name is on several patents, including a 1918 U.S. patent (#1,264,374) for a "Liquid prism device" with rigid closed sides which included a system for varying the density of a medium filling the prism and thereby varying the refraction of light waves passing through the prism, and a 1930 Canadian patent for the "cracking and distillation of hydrocarbon oils". During World War II, he gave up his business to help solve the Navy's training problems.

=== World War II ===
In 1941, then Commander de Florez visited the United Kingdom and wrote what would become an influential report on British aircraft simulator techniques. It influenced the establishing of the Special Devices Division of the Navy's Bureau of Aeronautics (what would later become the NAWCTSD). Later that year, Commander de Florez became head of the new Special Devices Desk in the Engineering Division of the Navy's Bureau of Aeronautics. De Florez championed the use of "synthetic training devices" and urged the Navy to undertake development of such devices to increase readiness. He also worked on the development of antisubmarine devices. De Florez has been credited with over sixty inventions.

During World War II, he was subsequently promoted to captain and then to Flag rank, becoming a rear admiral in 1944.

In 1944, de Florez was awarded the Robert J. Collier Trophy for 1943 for his work in training combat pilots and flight crews through the development of inexpensive synthetic devices.

De Florez was awarded with the Legion of Merit in June 1945.

=== Post-war ===
In 1946, Tufts University awarded de Florez an honorary Doctor of Science degree at commencement.

Admiral de Florez was the first director of technical research at the CIA. In 1950, de Florez helped Robert Fulton get a contract with the Office of Naval Research to develop the Fulton surface-to-air recovery system. In 1954, as the CIA's chairman of research, de Florez argued against reprimanding those responsible for the then-secret but now controversial MKULTRA L.S.D. research program.

In the mid-1950s, de Florez was the president of the Flight Safety Foundation. Presented since 1966, the Foundation's Admiral Luis de Florez Flight Safety Award is named after him. It recognizes "outstanding individual contributions to aviation safety, through basic design, device or practice." De Florez established a trust to support the award that provides each recipient with $1,000.

De Florez worked as an aide to Navy Vice Admiral Harold G. Bowen, Sr., Director of Office of Research and Invention (ORI) (later named ONR). He also once served as a director of Douglas Aircraft Corp.

Luis de Florez died in November 1962, at the age of 73 in the cockpit of his airplane, which was ready for take-off at a Connecticut airport. The main building complex at the Naval Air Warfare Center Training Systems Division, Naval Support Activity Orlando, Florida, is named in his honor.

== See also ==
- Hispanics in the United States Navy
- Hispanic Americans in World War II
