= Hispanic Americans in World War II =

Military contributions of Hispanic Americans

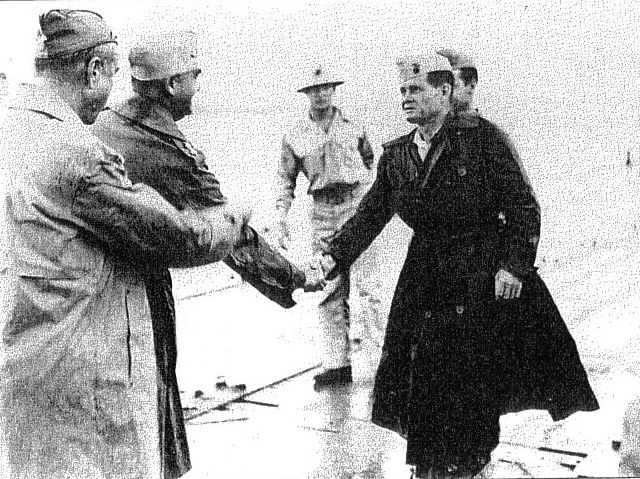
Major General Pedro del Valle (second from left) is greeted by Colonel "Chesty" Puller on Pavuvu in late October 1944, while Major General William H. Rupertus (far left) looks on.

Hispanic Americans, also referred to as Latinos, served in all elements of the American armed forces in the war. They fought in every major American battle in the war. Between 400,000 and 500,000 Hispanic Americans served in the U.S. Armed Forces during World War II, out of a total of 16,000,000, constituting 3.1% to 3.2% of the U.S. Armed Forces. The exact number is unknown as, at the time, Hispanics were not tabulated separately, but were included in the general white population census count. Separate statistics were kept for African Americans and Asian Americans.

On December 7, 1941, when the United States officially entered the war, Hispanic Americans were among the many American citizens who entered the ranks of the Army, Navy and Marine Corps as volunteers or through the draft. Not only did Hispanics serve as active combatants in the European and Pacific Theaters of war, but they also served on the home front as civilians. Hundreds of Hispanic women joined the Women's Army Auxiliary Corps (WAACs) and Women Accepted for Volunteer Emergency Service (WAVES), serving as nurses and in administrative positions. Many worked in traditionally male labor jobs in the manufacturing plants that produced munitions and materiel, replacing men who were away at war.

As conscription numbers increased, some Puerto Ricans from the island were assigned as replacements to units in the Panama Canal Zone and British Caribbean islands, which were made up mostly of continental (United States mainland) soldiers. Most Puerto Ricans and Hispanics residing in Puerto Rico were assigned to the 65th Infantry Regiment or to the Puerto Rico National Guard. These were the only all-Hispanic units whose statistics were kept. More than 53,000 Puerto Ricans and Hispanics who resided on the island served in the war. According to Senator Robert Menendez, more than 9,000 Latinos died in the defense of the United States in World War II. Because of a lack of documentation, the total number of Hispanic Americans who died in the conflict is unknown.

== Terminology ==
Hispanic American is an ethnic term used to categorize any citizen or resident of the United States, of any racial background, and of any religion, who has at least one ancestor from the people of Spain or any of the Spanish-speaking countries of the Americas. The three largest Hispanic groups in the United States are the Mexican Americans, Puerto Ricans, and Cuban Americans. Hispanic Americans have also been referred to as Latinos.

== Prelude to World War II ==
Before the United States entered World War II, Hispanic Americans were already fighting on European soil in the Spanish Civil War. The Spanish Civil War was a major conflict in Spain that started after an attempted coup d'état by parts of the army, led by the Nationalist General Francisco Franco, against the government of the Second Spanish Republic. Hispanic Americans fought on behalf of both of the factions involved, the "Nationalists" as members of the Spanish Army and the "Loyalists" (Republicans) either as members of the Abraham Lincoln International Brigade or as aviators in the Yankee Squadron led by Bert Acosta (1895–1954).

General Manuel Goded Llopis (1882–1936), who was born in San Juan, Puerto Rico, was a high-ranking officer in the Spanish Army. Llopis was among the first generals to join Franco in the uprising against the government of the Second Spanish Republic. Llopis led the fight against the Anarchists in Catalonia, but his troops were outnumbered. He was captured and sentenced to die by firing squad.

Lieutenant Carmelo Delgado Delgado (1913–1937) was among the many Hispanics who fought on behalf of the Second Spanish Republic as members of the Abraham Lincoln Brigade. Delgado fought in the Battle of Madrid, but was captured and sentenced to die by firing squad on April 29, 1937. He was amongst the first United States (US) citizens to die in that conflict.

== Pearl Harbor ==
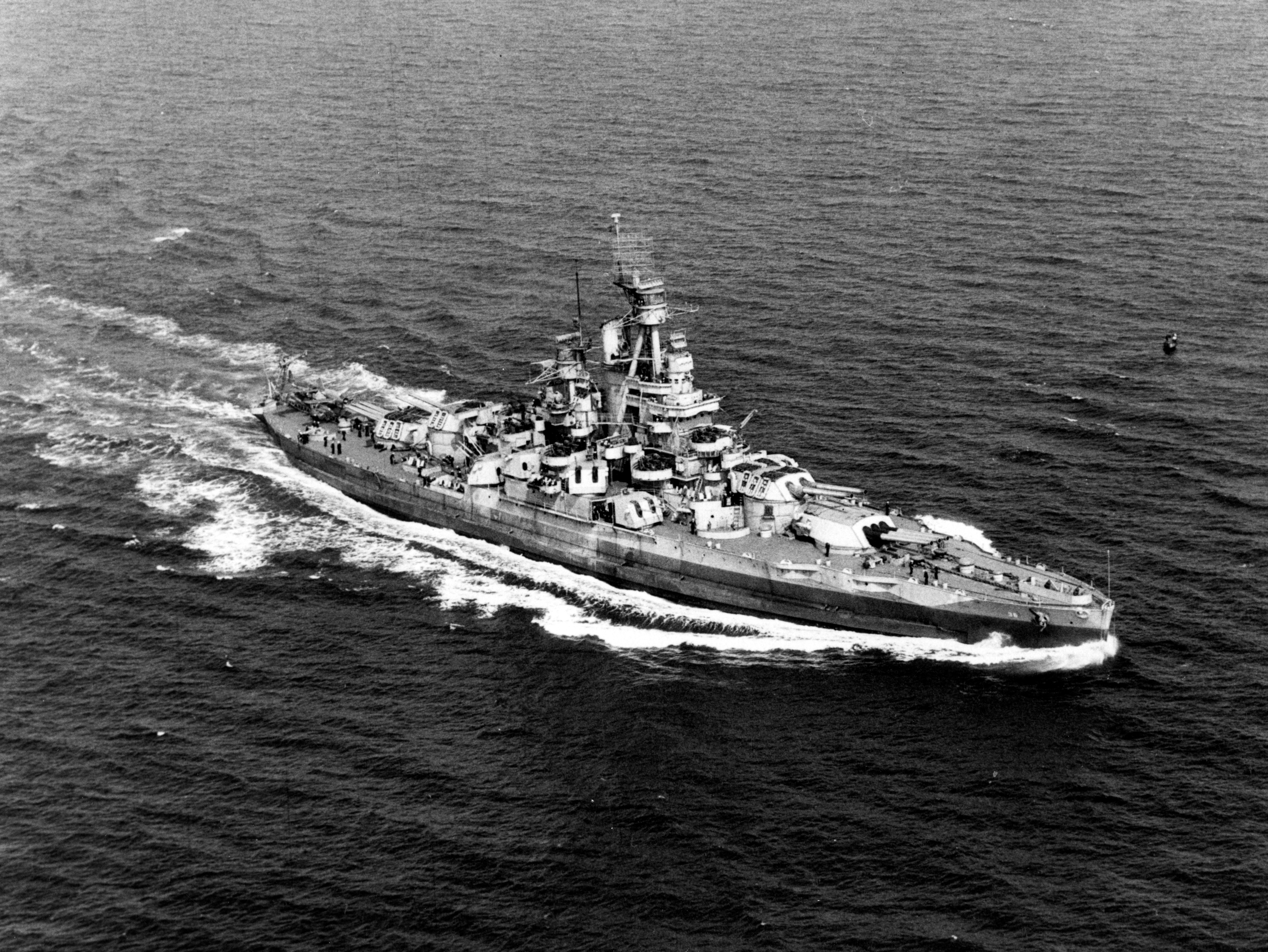
USS Nevada

On December 7, 1941, when the Empire of Japan attacked the United States Pacific Fleet at Pearl Harbor, many sailors with Hispanic surnames were among those who perished. PFC Richard I. Trujillo of the United States Marine Corps was serving aboard the battleship USS Nevada (BB-36) when the Japanese attacked Pearl Harbor. The Nevada was among the ships which were in the harbor that day. As her gunners opened fire and her engineers got up steam, she was struck by torpedoes and bombs from the Japanese attackers. Fifty men were killed and 109 wounded. Among those killed was Trujillo, who became the first Hispanic Marine casualty of World War II.

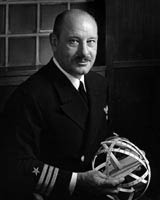
Commander Luis de Florez

When the United States officially entered World War II, Hispanic Americans were among the many American citizens who joined the ranks of United States Armed Forces as volunteers or through the draft.

In 1941, Commander Luis de Florez played an instrumental role in the establishment of the Special Devices Division of the Navy's Bureau of Aeronautics (what would later become the NAWCTSD). He was later assigned as head of the new Special Devices Desk in the Engineering Division of the Navy's Bureau of Aeronautics. De Florez, who has been credited with over sixty inventions, urged the Navy to undertake development of "synthetic training devices" to increase readiness. During World War II, he was promoted to captain and, in 1944, to rear admiral.

== European Theater ==
The European Theater of World War II was an area of heavy fighting between the Allied forces and the Axis powers from September 1, 1939, to May 8, 1945. The majority of Hispanic Americans served in regular units; some active combat units recruited from areas of high Hispanic population, such as the 65th Infantry Regiment from Puerto Rico and the 141st Infantry Regiment of the 36th Infantry Division, were made up mostly of Hispanics.

Hispanics of the 141st Regiment of the 36th Infantry Division were some of the first American troops to land on Italian soil at Salerno. Company E of the 141st Regiment was entirely Hispanic. The 36th Infantry Division fought in Italy and France.

=== 65th Infantry Regiment ===
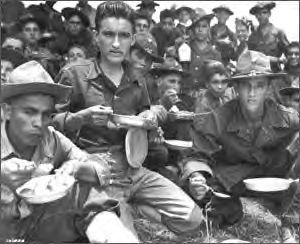
Soldiers of the 65th Infantry training in Salinas, Puerto Rico, August 1941

A small detachment of insular troops from Puerto Rico was sent to Cuba in late March as a guard for Batista Field. In 1943, the 65th Infantry was sent to Panama to protect the Pacific and the Atlantic sides of the isthmus and the Panama Canal, critical to oceangoing ships. An increase in the Puerto Rican induction program was immediately authorized. Continental troops such as the 762nd Antiaircraft Artillery Gun Battalion, 766th AAA Gun Battalion and the 891st AAA Gun Battalions were replaced by Puerto Ricans in Panama. They also replaced troops in the bases on British Islands, to the extent permitted by the availability of trained Puerto Rican units. The 295th Infantry Regiment followed the 65th Infantry in 1944, departing from San Juan, Puerto Rico to the Panama Canal Zone.

That same year, the 65th Infantry was sent to North Africa, where they underwent further training. By April 29, 1944, the regiment had landed in Italy and moved on to Corsica. On September 22, 1944, the 65th Infantry landed in France and was committed to action in the Maritime Alps at Peira Cava. On December 13, 1944, the 65th Infantry, under the command of Lieutenant Colonel Juan César Cordero Dávila, relieved the 2nd Battalion of the 442nd Infantry Regiment, a regiment which was made up of Japanese Americans under the command of Col. Virgil R. Miller, a native of Puerto Rico.

The 3rd Battalion fought against and defeated the German 107th Infantry Regiment, which was assigned to the 34th Infantry Division. There were 47 battle casualties, including Pvt. Sergio Sanchez-Sanchez and Sergeant Angel Martinez from Sabana Grande, who were the first two Puerto Ricans from the 65th Infantry to be killed in combat action. On March 18, 1945, the regiment was sent to the District of Mannheim and assigned to military occupation duties after the end of the war. The regiment suffered 23 soldiers killed in action.

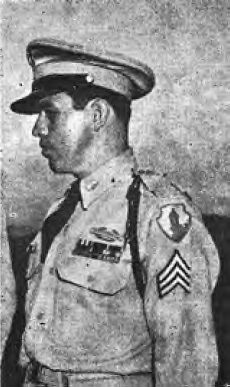
Sergeant First Class Agustín Ramos Calero

In March 1943, Private First Class Joseph (Jose) R. Martinez, a member of General George S. Patton's Seventh Army, destroyed a German infantry unit and tank in Tunis by directing heavy artillery fire, saving his platoon from being attacked in the process. He received the Distinguished Service Cross, second to the Medal of Honor.

Sergeant First Class Agustín Ramos Calero, a member of the 65th Infantry who was reassigned to the 3rd U.S. Infantry Division because of his ability to speak and understand English, was one of the most decorated Hispanic soldiers in the European Theater. Calero was born and raised in Isabela, in the northern region of Puerto Rico. He joined the U.S. Army in 1941 and was assigned to Puerto Rico's 65th Infantry Regiment at Camp Las Casas in Santurce, where he received training as a rifleman. Calero was later reassigned to the 3rd U.S. Infantry Division and later sent to Europe.

In 1945, Calero's company engaged in combat against a squad of German soldiers in the Battle of Colmar Pocket in the vicinity of Colmar, France. Calero attacked the enemy squad, killing 10 and capturing 21 enemy soldiers before being wounded. For these actions, he was awarded the Silver Star Medal and nicknamed "One-Man Army" by his comrades. Calero was wounded four times during combat in Europe. He was awarded 22 decorations and medals for his actions, making him one of the most decorated Hispanic soldiers in the U.S. military during World War II. Among his many decorations were the Silver Star Medal, four Purple Hearts and the French Croix de guerre.

== Pacific Theater ==
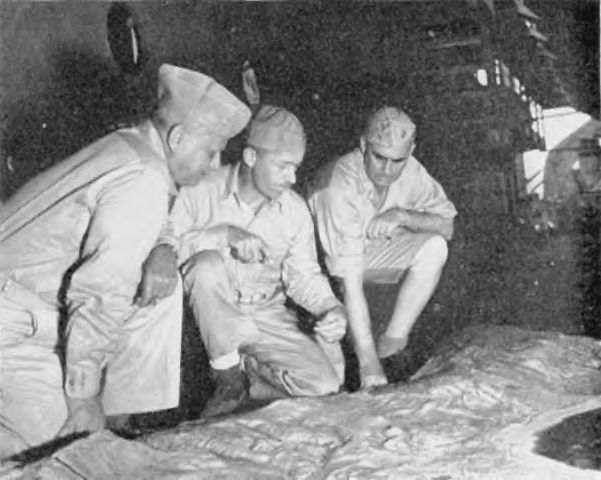
Left to right: Major General Geiger, Corps Commander; Colonel Silverthorn, Corps Chief of Staff and Brigadier General del Valle, Corps Artillery Commander, examine a plaster relief map of Guam on board USS Appalachian.

Three units of mostly Hispanic Americans served in the Pacific Theater battlefields: the 200th Coast Artillery, the 515th Anti-Aircraft Artillery Battalions from New Mexico, and the 158th Infantry Regiment from Arizona.

=== Bataan Death March ===
Two National Guard units, the 200th and the 515th Battalions, were activated in New Mexico in 1940. Made up mostly of Spanish-speaking Hispanics from New Mexico, Arizona and Texas, the two battalions were sent to Clark Field in the Philippine Islands. Shortly after the Imperial Japanese Navy launched its surprise attack on the American naval base at Pearl Harbor, Japanese forces attacked the American positions in the Philippines. General Douglas MacArthur moved his forces, which included the 200th and 515th, to the Bataan Peninsula, where they fought alongside Filipinos for three months against the attacking forces.

By April 9, 1942, rations, medical supplies, and ammunition became scarce and the decision was made to surrender. The 200th and 515th Battalions were part of the forces surrendering to the Japanese. These Hispanic and non-Hispanic soldiers endured the 12-day, 85-mile (137 km) march from Bataan to the Japanese prison camps. They were force-marched in scorching heat through the Philippine jungle. Survivors remained interned for 34 months in a prisoner-of-war (POW) camp. Others were wounded or killed when unmarked enemy ships transporting prisoners of war to Japan were sunk by U.S. air and naval forces.

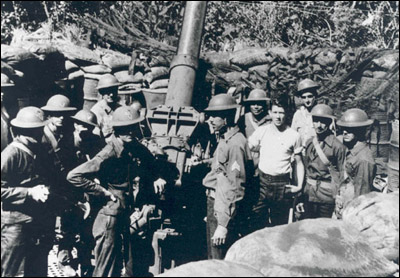
Members of New Mexico's 200th Coast Artillery (AA) manning a position near Manila

Colonel Virgilio N. Cordero Jr. (1893–1980) was a battalion commander in the 31st Infantry Regiment on December 8, 1941, when Japanese planes attacked the U.S. military installations in the Philippines. Cordero and his men underwent brutal torture and humiliation during the Bataan Death March and nearly four years of captivity. Cordero was one of nearly 1,600 members of the 31st Infantry who were taken as prisoners. Half of these men perished while prisoners of the Japanese forces. Cordero was freed when Allied troops defeated the Japanese and he returned to the United States. Cordero, who retired with the rank of brigadier general, wrote about his experiences as a prisoner of war and what he went through during the Bataan Death March. The book, titled My Experiences during the War with Japan, was published in 1950. In 1957, he authored a revised Spanish version titled Bataan y la Marcha de la Muerte; Volume 7 of Colección Vida e Historia.

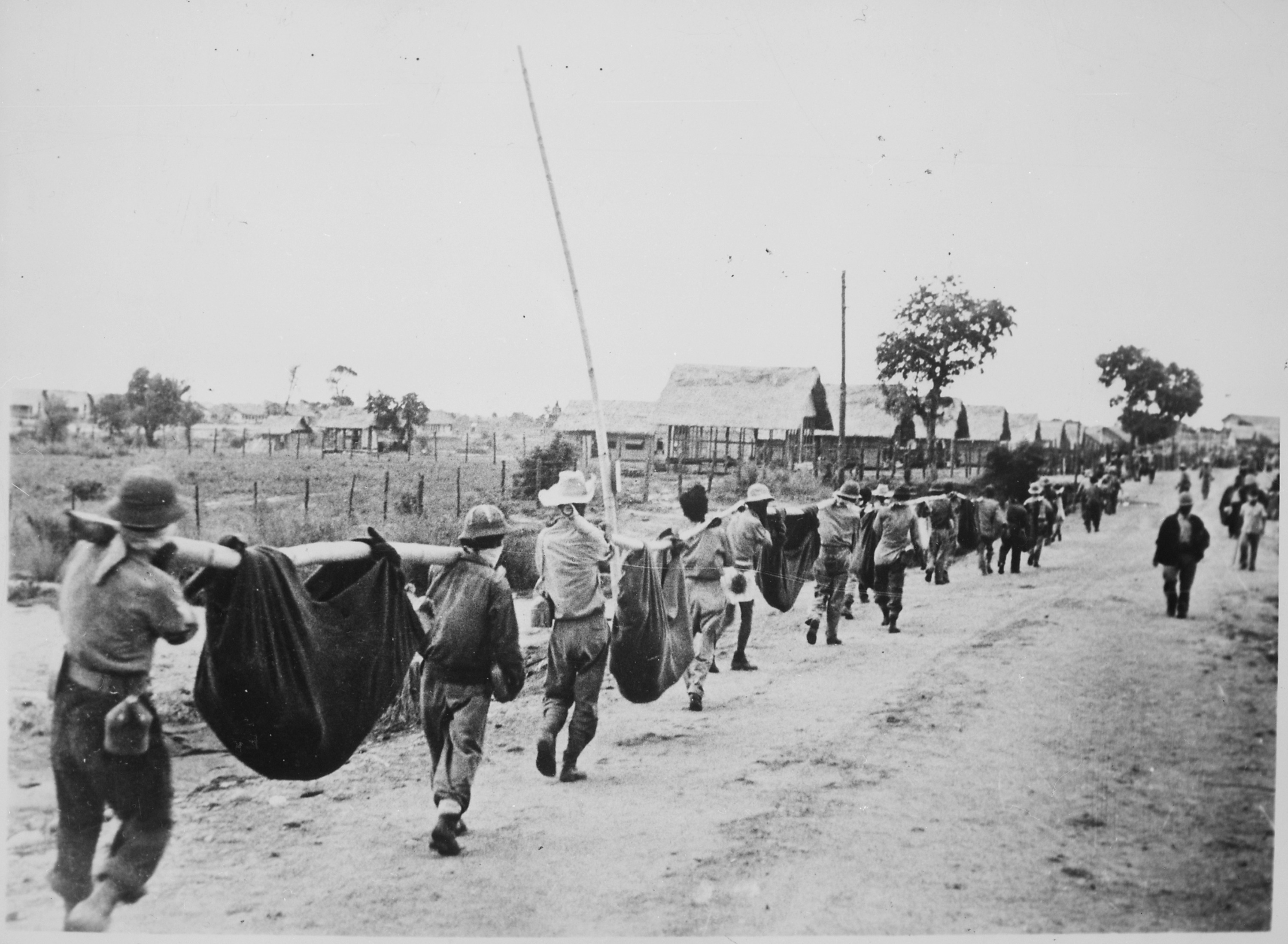
American prisoners of war, in a burial detail, carry the bodies of those who died during the Bataan Death March

Private (Pvt.) Ralph Rodriguez, age 25, of the 200th Coast Artillery Battalion was a Bataan Death March survivor. According to Rodriguez, the Japanese ordered the American soldiers to begin marching. Soldiers who faltered during the march were prodded with bayonets, while those unable to continue were killed. He remembered a sense of brotherhood among the Hispanic soldiers who marched together in groups, and assisted each other along the way. When the soldiers reached their detention center, they were forced into a 30-by-100 foot fenced area. Later, the soldiers were housed in boxcars. One hundred soldiers were crammed into a car built to hold 40 or 50 men. The train took the soldiers on a four-hour ride to Camp O'Donnell where they became prisoners of war.

Corporal Agapito E. "Gap" Silva (1919–2007), was another member of the 200th Coast Artillery Battalion who survived the Bataan Death March. He was held at Cabanatuan prison camp in the Philippines and assigned to the "burial details" when hundreds of prisoners were dying each month of disease and starvation. He was later transported to Fukuoka POW Camp #17, a Japanese prison camp near Omuta, Japan. There he was forced to work as a slave laborer in a coal plant. Silva narrated the following about his experiences as a prisoner of war:

"The POWs (prisoner of war) faced constant danger working in the coal mines. It was so unbearable that many of the men would resort to self-inflicted injuries such as breaking their arms and legs to avoid working 10 to 12 hour days."

Silva and more than 1,900 American POWs were forced to work in coal mine camps encircled by electric fences. Silva would spend 3½ years in the Japanese POW camps before the war ended in September 1945. He was the recipient of the Bronze Star and Purple Heart Medal.

=== 158th Infantry Regiment ===
The 158th Infantry Regiment, an Arizona National Guard unit of mostly Hispanic soldiers, also fought in the Pacific Theater. Early in the war, the 158th, nicknamed the "Bushmasters", was deployed to protect the Panama Canal and completed jungle training. The unit later fought the Japanese in the New Guinea area in heavy combat and was involved in the liberation of the Philippine Islands (by this time the unit had been renamed the 158th Regimental Combat Team). General MacArthur referred to them as "the greatest fighting combat team ever deployed for battle." The 158th was selected as part of the spearhead of the invasion of Japan and slated to silence Japanese air warning stations south of Kyushu two days before the invasion. The planned invasion of Japan was never conducted; after Japan's surrender, the unit was sent on October 13, 1945, to Yokohama, Japan, as part of the United States Army of occupation.

=== PFC Guy Gabaldon ===
Private First Class Guy Gabaldon was a young Marine who single-handedly persuaded more than 1,000 enemy civilians and troops to surrender.

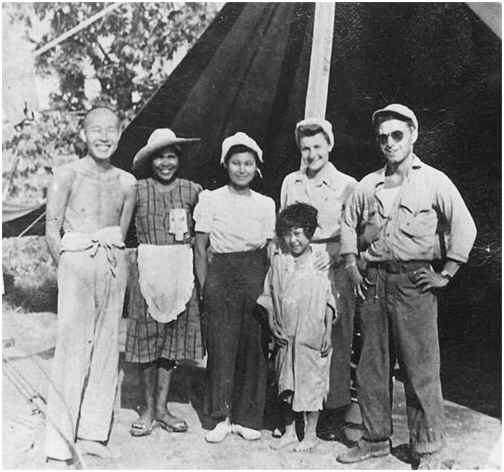
Guy Gabaldon (right) poses in a group that includes Japanese prisoners in 1944

PFC Guy Gabaldon (1926–2006) was raised in East Los Angeles where he grew up around people of all races, including Japanese-Americans. Through those friendships, he was able to teach himself to speak Japanese. Gabaldon joined the Marines when he was only 17 years old; he was a Private First Class (PFC) when his unit was engaged in the Battle of Saipan in 1944. Gabaldon, who acted as the Japanese interpreter for the Second Marines, working alone in front of the lines, entered enemy caves, pillboxes, buildings, and jungle brush, frequently in the face of hostile fire, and succeeded not only in obtaining vital military information, but in convincing over 1,500 enemy civilians and troops to surrender. He was nominated for the Medal of Honor, but was awarded the Silver Star instead. His medal was later upgraded to the Navy Cross, the Marines' second-highest decoration for heroism. Gabaldon's actions on Saipan were later memorialized in the film Hell to Eternity, in which he was portrayed by actor Jeffrey Hunter.

=== Guarding the atomic bomb ===
In 1945, when Kwajalein of the Marshall Islands was secured by the U.S. forces, Sergeant Fernando Bernacett from Puerto Rico was among the Marines who were sent to guard various essential military installations. Bernacett, a combat veteran of the Battle of Midway, guarded the airport and POWs, as well as the atomic bomb as it was transported to Japan.

== United States Coast Guard ==
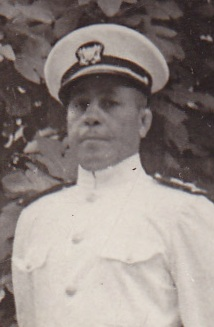
CWO2 Joseph B. Aviles Sr.

Many Hispanics also served in the United States Coast Guard. Joseph B. Aviles Sr. was the first Hispanic to be promoted to chief petty officer in the Coast Guard after transferring from the Navy in 1925. During the war he was also the first Hispanic to be promoted to chief warrant officer.

Valentin R. Fernandez was awarded a Silver Lifesaving Medal for "maneuvering a Marine landing party ashore under constant Japanese attack" during the invasion of Saipan.

Louis Rua was awarded the Bronze Star Medal for "meritorious achievement at sea December 5–6, 1944, while serving aboard a U.S. Army large tug en route to the Philippines. His craft went to the rescue of another ship which had been torpedoed by enemy action and saved 277 survivors from the abandoned ship." He was the first known Hispanic-American Coast Guardsman to be awarded the Bronze Star Medal.

Gunner's Mate Second Class Joseph Tezanos was awarded a Navy & Marine Corps Medal during World War II for "...distinguished heroism while serving as a volunteer member of a boat crew engaged in rescue operations during a fire in Pearl Harbor, Oahu, T.H. on 21 May 1944. Under conditions of great personal danger from fire and explosions and with disregard of his own safety he assisted in the rescuing of approximately 42 survivors some of whom were injured and exhausted from the water and from burning ships." He was also the second known Hispanic-American to complete OCS training at the Coast Guard Academy.

Not everyone served aboard ships during the war. Some men like Jose R. Zaragoza served on atolls or other shore locations. When 19-year-old Zaragoza, a native of Los Angeles, California, joined the Coast Guard, he was sent on patrols in the Pacific coast of the United States defending against sabotage and invasion from the Japanese. He then trained in the new and classified field of Loran navigation and was sent to Ulithi atoll, located between Guam and the Philippines. He was stationed on Ulithi Island for 15 months.

== Aviators ==
Hispanics not only served in ground and seabound combat units, they also distinguished themselves as fighter pilots and as bombardiers. In 1944, Puerto Rican aviators were sent to the Tuskegee Army Air Field in Tuskegee, Alabama, to train the famed Tuskegee Airmen of the 99th Fighter Squadron. The Tuskegee Airmen were the first African-American military aviators in the United States armed forces. Puerto Ricans were also involved in clerical positions with the Tuskegee unit. Among the Puerto Ricans who helped make the Tuskegee experiment a successful one were T/Sgt. Pablo Diaz Albortt, a Non Commissioned Officer (NCO) in charge of the Special Service Office, and Eugene Calderon, who was assigned to the "Red Tail" unit, as the Company Clerk. By the end of the war, the Tuskegee Airmen were credited with 109 Luftwaffe aircraft shot down, a patrol boat run aground by machine-gun fire, and destruction of numerous fuel dumps, trucks and trains.

A "flying ace" or fighter ace is a military aviator credited with shooting down five or more enemy aircraft during aerial combat. The term "ace in a day" is used to designate a fighter pilot who has shot down five or more enemy aircraft in a single day. Since World War I, a number of pilots have achieved the feat; the last American to achieve "ace in a day" status in World War II was First Lieutenant Oscar Francis Perdomo of the 464th Fighter Squadron, 507th Fighter Group.

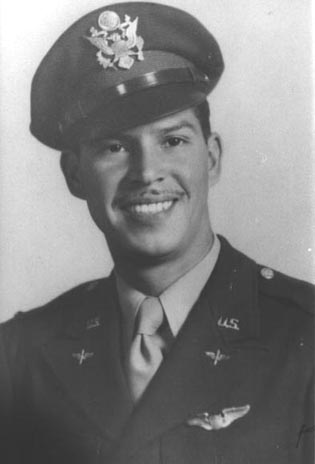
Lt. Oscar Francis Perdomo

First Lieutenant Perdomo, (1919–1976), the son of Mexican parents, was born in El Paso, Texas. When the war broke out, Perdomo joined the United States Army Air Forces (USAAF) as an aviation cadet and was trained to fly the P-47 Thunderbolt. After finishing his pilot training, he was assigned to the 464th Fighter Squadron, which was part of the 507th Fighter Group sent to the Pacific Island of Ie Shima off the west coast of Okinawa.

On August 13, 1945, 1st Lt. Perdomo shot down four Nakajima Ki-43 "Oscar" fighters and one Yokosuka K5Y "Willow" Type 93 biplane trainer near Keijo/Seoul, Korea. Perdomo's unit (38 Thunderbolts of the 507th Fighter Wing) engaged approximately 50 enemy aircraft. This action was Lt. Perdomo's tenth and final combat mission. He ended the war with the Distinguished Service Cross for extraordinary heroism in action and the Air Medal with one oak leaf cluster.

Not all Hispanics who served in aviation units were pilots or aces. Examples ranging from aces to air crew members show the diversity of their experiences in the air war.

- Commander Eugene A. Valencia Jr., United States Navy (USN) fighter ace, is credited with 23 air victories in the Pacific during World War II. Valencia's decorations include the Navy Cross, six Distinguished Flying Crosses, and six Air Medals.
- Lieutenant Colonel Donald S. Lopez Sr., USAAF pilot credited with shooting down five Japanese fighters in the China theater. He eventually became the deputy director of the National Air and Space Museum
- Captain Michael Brezas, USAAF fighter ace, arrived in Lucera, Italy during the summer of 1944, joining the 48th Fighter Squadron of the 14th Fighter Group. Flying the P-38 aircraft, Lt. Brezas downed 12 enemy planes within two months. He received the Silver Star Medal, the Distinguished Flying Cross, and the Air Medal with eleven oak leaf clusters.
- Captain Mihiel "Mike" Gilormini, Royal Air Force and USAAF, was a flight commander whose last combat mission was attacking the airfield at Milano, Italy. His last flight in Italy gave air cover for General George C. Marshall's visit to Pisa. Gilormini was the recipient of the Silver Star Medal, five Distinguished Flying Crosses, and the Air Medal with four oak leaf clusters. Gilormini later founded the Puerto Rico Air National Guard and retired as brigadier general.
- Captain Alberto A. Nido served in the Royal Canadian Air Force, the British Royal Air Force and the USAAF. He flew missions as a bomber pilot for the RCAF and as a Supermarine Spitfire fighter pilot for the RAF. As a member of the RAF, he participated in 275 combat missions. Nido later transferred to the USAAF's 67th Fighter Group as a P-51 Mustang fighter pilot. He was awarded the Distinguished Flying Cross with four oak leaf clusters and the Air Medal with four oak leaf clusters. Nido co-founded the Puerto Rico Air National Guard and, as Gilormini, retired a brigadier general.
- Captain Robert L. Cardenas, USAAF, served as a B-24 aircraft pilot in the European Theater of Operations with the 506th Bombardment Squadron. He was awarded the Air Medal and two oak leaf clusters in 20 bombing missions. Shot down over Germany in March 1944, he made his way to Allied-controlled territory, despite head wounds from flak. A key postwar Air Force test pilot, Cardenas flew over 100 aircraft, including America's first jet fighter and first jet bomber. He flew the B-29 bomber that launched the X-1 rocket plane in which Chuck Yeager became the first man to fly faster than the speed of sound. Ending his career as chief of U.S. nuclear target selection, Cardenas retired as a brigadier general, and is enshrined in the National Aviation Hall of Fame and International Air & Space Hall of Fame.
- 2nd Lieutenant César Luis González, USAAF, the co-pilot of a C-47, was the first Puerto Rican pilot in the United States Army Air Forces. He was one of the initial participants of the invasion of Sicily on July 10, 1943, Operation Husky. He flew on two night missions, the first on July 9, where his mission was to drop paratroops of 82nd Airborne Division on the area of Gela and the second on July 11, when he dropped reinforcements in the area. His unit was awarded the Distinguished Unit Citation for carrying out this second mission in spite of bad weather and heavy fire from enemy ground and naval forces. González died on November 22, 1943, when his plane crashed during training off the end of the runway at Castelvetrano. He was posthumously promoted to first lieutenant.
- Lieutenant Richard Gomez Candelaria, USAAF, was a P-51 Mustang pilot from the 435th Fighter Squadron of the 479th Fighter Group. With six aerial victories to his credit, Candelaria was the only "ace" in his squadron. Most of his victories were achieved on a single mission on April 7, 1945, when he found himself the lone escort protecting a formation of USAAF B-24 Liberators. Candelaria defended the bombers from at least 15 German fighters, single-handedly destroying four before help arrived. He was also credited with a probable victory on an Me 262 during this engagement. Six days later, Candelaria was shot down by ground fire, and spent the rest of the war as a POW. After the war, Candelaria served in the Air National Guard, reaching the rank of colonel prior to his retirement.

Lt. Francisco Mercado Jr. awarded the Distinguished Flying Cross by General Leon W. Johnson

- Lieutenant José Antonio Muñiz, USAAF, served with distinction in the China-Burma-India Theater. He flew 20 combat mission against the Imperial Japanese Army Air Force and shot down a Mitsubishi A6M Zero. In 1960, Muñiz was killed in during a mishap involving of F-86s celebrating the 4th of July Puerto Rico. During take-off his engine flamed out and crashed. In 1963, the Air National Guard Base, at the San Juan International airport in Puerto Rico, was renamed "Muñiz Air National Guard Base" in his honor.
- Lieutenant Arthur Van Haren Jr., USN, was the highest-scoring pilot of World War II from Arizona. He was part of U.S. Navy Fighting Squadron Two (VF-2 "Rippers"). Based on USS Hornet, a United States Navy aircraft carrier of the Essex class, Lt. Van Haren Jr., flew the F6F Hellcat. He downed nine confirmed enemy planes during combat in the Pacific Theater skies, and had three additional unconfirmed kills. Three of his nine kills occurred in the Marianas Turkey Shoot. Additionally, Van Haren Jr. was awarded two Distinguished Flying Cross (United States) medals.
- Technical Sergeant Clement Resto, USAAF, served with the 303rd Bomb Group and participated in numerous bombing raids over Germany. During a bombing mission over Duren, Germany, Resto's plane, a B-17, was shot down. He was captured by the Gestapo and sent to Stalag XVII-B where he spent the rest of the war as a prisoner of war. Resto, who lost an eye during his last mission, was awarded a Purple Heart, a POW Medal and an Air Medal with one battle star after he was liberated from captivity.
- Corporal Frank Medina, USAAF, was an air crew member on a B-24 that was shot down over Italy. He was the only one to evade capture. Medina said his ability to speak Spanish had allowed him to communicate with friendly Italians who helped him avoid capture for eight months behind enemy lines.

== Servicewomen ==
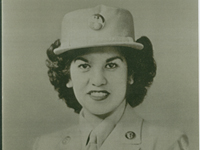
Staff Sergeant Eva Romero Jacques

Prior to World War II, traditional Hispanic cultural values expected women to be homemakers and they rarely left the home to earn an income. This outlook discouraged women from joining the military. Only a small number of Hispanic women had joined before World War II. The outbreak of World War II changed many cultural prohibitions. With the creation of the Women's Army Auxiliary Corps (WAAC), predecessor of the Women's Army Corps (WAC), and the U.S. Navy's Women Accepted for Volunteer Emergency Service (WAVES), women could assume certain administrative duties vacated by the men who were reassigned to combat zones. Most women who served in the military joined the WAACs. One of the first Hispanic women to serve in the USAAF was Staff Sergeant Eva Romero Jacques. Romero Jacques, who spoke Spanish and English and had three years of college spent two years in the Pacific Theater, 1944 in New Guinea and 1945 in the Philippines, as an administrative aide. She also survived a plane crash in New Guinea.

In 1944, the Army recruited women in Puerto Rico for a segregated Hispanic unit in the Women's Army Corps (WAC). Over 1,000 applications were received for the unit, which was to be composed of 200 women. After their basic training at Fort Oglethorpe, Georgia, the Puerto Rican WAC unit (Company 6, 2nd Battalion, 21st Regiment of the Women's Army Auxiliary Corps) was assigned to the New York Port of Embarkation to work in military offices planning the shipment of troops around the world. Among them was PFC Carmen García Rosado, who in 2006, authored and published a book titled "LAS WACS – Participacion de la Mujer Boricua en la Segunda Guerra Mundial" (The WACs –The Participation of the Puerto Rican Women in the Second World War), the first book to document the experiences of Puerto Rican women who participated in the war. Not all of the WAAC units were stationed in the mainland USA. In January 1943, the 149th WAAC Post Headquarters Company became the first WAAC unit to go overseas when they went to North Africa. Serving overseas was dangerous for women; if captured, WAACs, as "auxiliaries" serving with the Army rather than in it, did not have the same protections under international law as male soldiers. This issue did not apply to the WAVES, who were granted full military benefits.

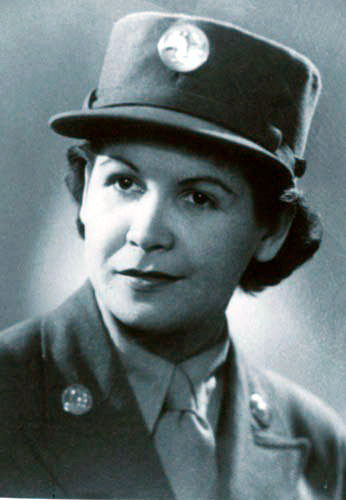
Tech4 Carmen Contreras-Bozak

One of the members of the 149th WAAC Post Headquarters Company was Tech4 Carmen Contreras-Bozak, who served in Algiers with General Dwight D. Eisenhower's theater headquarters. Contreras joined the Women's Army Auxiliary Corps (WAAC) in 1942 and was sent to Fort Lee, Virginia, for training. Contreras volunteered to be part of the 149th WAAC Post Headquarters Company, becoming the first Hispanic to serve as an interpreter.

Contreras' unit arrived in North Africa on January 27, 1943, experiencing nightly German air raids. Contreras remembers the women who served abroad were not treated like the regular Army servicemen. They did not receive overseas pay or government life insurance. She served until 1945 and earned the European-African Middle Eastern Campaign Medal with 2 Battle Stars, World War II Victory Medal, American Campaign Medal, Women's Army Corps Service Medal and the Army Good Conduct Medal.

Mercedes O. Cubria, born in Guantanamo, Cuba, became a United States Citizen in 1924. She joined the WAC in 1943 and served in U.S. Counter-Intelligence. She retired in 1973 with the rank of lieutenant colonel.

Other Hispanic servicewomen like Contreras and Cubria served either in the WAACs, WAVES or MCWR (Marine Corps Women's Reserve); among them Lieutenant Junior Grade Maria Rodriguez-Denton. The Navy assigned Rodriguez-Denton as a library assistant at the Cable and Censorship Office in New York City. It was Rodriguez-Denton who forwarded the news (through channels) to President Harry S. Truman that the war had ended.

=== Nurse Corps ===
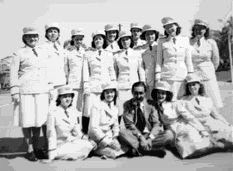
Puerto Rican Army nurses, 296th Station Hospital, Camp Tortuguero, Vega Baja, PR.

When the United States entered World War II, the military needed nurses. Hispanic female nurses wanted to volunteer for service but they were not immediately accepted into the Army Nurse Corps or Navy Nurse Corps. As more Hispanic men joined the armed forces, a need for bilingual nurses became apparent and the Army started to recruit Hispanic nurses. In 1944, the Army Nurse Corps (ANC) decided to accept Puerto Rican nurses. Thirteen women submitted applications, were interviewed, underwent physical examinations, and were accepted into the ANC. Eight of these nurses were assigned to the Army Post at San Juan, Puerto Rico, where they were valued for their bilingual abilities. Five nurses were assigned to work at the hospital at Camp Tortuguero in Puerto Rico. One of these nurses was Second Lieutenant Carmen Lozano Dumler.

Second Lieutenant Carmen Lozano Dumler was born and raised in San Juan, Puerto Rico, where she also received her primary and secondary education. After graduating from high school, she enrolled in the Presbyterian Hospital School of Nursing in San Juan where she became a certified nurse in 1944. On August 21, 1944, she was sworn in as a second lieutenant and assigned to the 161st General Hospital in San Juan, where she received further training. Upon completing her advanced training, she was sent to Camp Tortuguero where she also assisted as an interpreter.

In 1945, Lozano Dumler was reassigned to the 359th Station Hospital of Ft. Read, Trinidad and Tobago, British West Indies, where she attended wounded soldiers who had returned from Normandy, France. After the war, Lozano, like so many other women in the military, returned to civilian life. She continued her nursing career in Puerto Rico until she retired in 1975.

Another Hispanic nurse who distinguished herself in service was Lieutenant Maria Roach. Roach, a recipient of two Bronze Star Medals and an Air Medal, served as a flight nurse with the Army Nurse Corps in the China-Burma-India Theater of Operations.

=== Other notable cases ===
Another very particular case was carried out by Colombian sergeant Benjamín Quintero Martínez, who served in the Pacific War in the defense of the Aleutian Islands, holding the position of technical sergeant communications in the Pacific, Aleutian Islands, and Alaska.

== Senior officers ==
Most of the Hispanics serving as senior military officers during World War II were graduates of the United States Naval Academy. The three highest ranking Hispanic officers who played an instrumental role in the war were Major General (later Lieutenant General) Pedro Augusto del Valle—the first Hispanic to reach the rank of general in the U.S. Marine Corps, Brigadier General (later Lieutenant General) Elwood R. "Pete" Quesada of the Army Air Forces, and Army Major General Terry de la Mesa Allen.

=== Generals ===
Major General del Valle

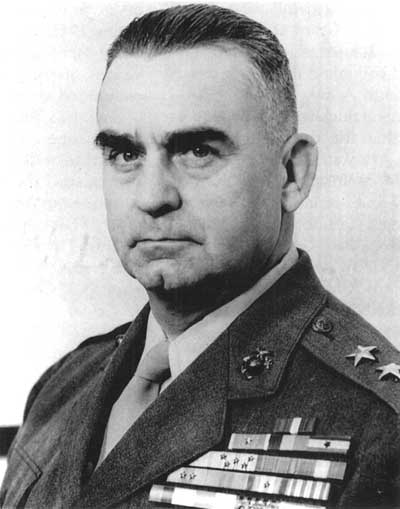
Lieutenant General Pedro del Valle

Lieutenant General Pedro Augusto del Valle (1893–1978), as a colonel was the commanding officer of the 11th Marine Regiment (artillery). Upon the outbreak of World War II, del Valle led his regiment during the seizure and defense of Guadalcanal, providing artillery support for the 1st Marine Division. In the Battle of the Tenaru, the firepower provided by del Valle's artillery units killed many assaulting Japanese soldiers—almost to the last man—before they reached the Marine positions. As a result of the outcome of the battle Japanese commander, Colonel Ichiki Kiyonao, committed seppuku shortly afterwards. General Alexander Vandegrift, impressed with del Valle's leadership, recommended his promotion and on October 1, 1942, del Valle became a brigadier general. Vandegrift retained del Valle as head of the 11th Marines, the only time that the 11th Marines has ever had a general as their commanding officer. In 1943, he served as Commander of Marine Forces overseeing Guadalcanal, Tulagi, and the Russell and Florida Islands.

On April 1, 1944, del Valle, as Commanding General of the Third Corps Artillery, III Marine Amphibious Corps, took part in the Battle of Guam and was awarded a Gold Star in lieu of a second Legion of Merit. The men under his command did such a good job with their heavy artillery that no one man could be singled out for commendation. Instead each man was given a letter of commendation by del Valle, which was carried in his record books.

In late October 1944, del Valle succeeded Major General William Rupertus as Commanding General of the 1st Marine Division, being personally greeted to his new command by Colonel Lewis Burwell "Chesty" Puller. At the time, the 1st Marine Division was training on the island of Pavuvu for the invasion of Okinawa. On May 29, 1945, del Valle participated in one of the most important events that led to victory in Okinawa. After five weeks of fighting, del Valle ordered Company A of the 1st Battalion 5th Marines to capture Shuri Castle, a medieval fortress of the ancient Ryukyuan kings. Seizure of Shuri Castle represented a morale blow for the Japanese and was a milestone in the Okinawa campaign. The fighting in Okinawa would continue for 24 more days. Del Valle was awarded a Distinguished Service Medal for his leadership during the battle and the subsequent occupation and reorganization of Okinawa.

Brigadier General Quesada

Lt. Gen. Elwood R. Quesada

Lieutenant General Elwood R. "Pete" Quesada, (1904–1993) was assigned as a brigadier general in October 1940 to intelligence in the Office of the Chief of Air Corps. He became commanding general of the 9th Fighter Command, where he established advanced headquarters on the Normandy beachhead on D-Day plus one, and directed his planes in aerial cover and air support for the Allied invasion of the European continent. He was the foremost proponent of "the inherent flexibility of air power", a principle he helped prove during World War II.

In December 1942, Quesada took the First Air Defense Wing to North Africa. Shortly thereafter, he was given command of the XII Fighter Command and in this capacity would work out the mechanics of close air support and Army-Air Force cooperation.

The successful integration of air and land forces in the Tunisia campaign forged by Quesada and the Allied leaders became a blueprint for operations incorporated into Army Air Forces field regulations—FM 100-20, "Command and Employment of Air Power", first published on July 21, 1943—and provided the Allies with their first victory in the European war. Principles such as the co-equality of ground and air force commanders, centralized command of tactical aircraft to exploit "the inherent flexibility of air power", and the attainment of air superiority over the battlefield as a prerequisite for successful ground operations formed the core of tactical air doctrine. In October 1943, Quesada assumed command of the IX Fighter Command in England, and his forces provided air cover for the landings in Normandy. Among Quesada's many military decorations were the Distinguished Service Medal with oak leaf cluster; Distinguished Flying Cross; Purple Heart and an Air Medal with two silver star devices.

Major General Terry de la Mesa Allen

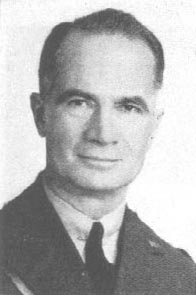
Brigadier General Terry de la Mesa Allen

Major General Terry de la Mesa Allen Sr. (1888–1969) was the son of Colonel Samuel Edward Allen and Conchita Alvarez de la Mesa. During World War II he was the commanding general of the 1st Infantry Division in North Africa and Sicily, and was made commander of the 104th Infantry Division. While in North Africa Allen and his deputy 1st Division Commander, Brigadier General Theodore Roosevelt Jr. distinguished themselves as combat leaders. Allen was reassigned to the 104th Infantry Division. The 104th Infantry Division landed in France on September 7, 1944, and fought for 195 consecutive days during World War II. The division's nickname came from its timberwolf shoulder insignia. Some 34,000 men served with the division under Allen, who came to be nicknamed "Terrible Terry". The division was particularly renowned for its night fighting prowess.

=== Commanders ===
In 1941, Commander Luis de Florez played an instrumental role in the establishment of the Special Devices Division of the Navy's Bureau of Aeronautics (what would later become the NAWCTSD). He was later assigned as head of the new Special Devices Desk in the Engineering Division of the Navy's Bureau of Aeronautics. De Florez, who has been credited with over sixty inventions, urged the Navy to undertake development of "synthetic training devices" to increase readiness. During World War II, he was promoted to captain and, in 1944, to rear admiral.

A number of Hispanics served in senior leadership positions during World War II, including Admiral Horacio Rivero Jr. (USN), Rear Admiral Jose M. Cabanillas (USN), Rear Admiral Edmund Ernest García (USN), Rear Admiral Frederick Lois Riefkohl (USN), Rear Admiral Henry G. Sanchez (USN), Colonel Louis Gonzaga Mendez Jr. (USA), Colonel Virgil R. Miller (USA), Colonel Jaime Sabater Sr. (USMC) and Lieutenant Colonel Chester J. Salazar (USMC).

- Admiral Horacio Rivero Jr., USN, served aboard the cruiser USS San Juan, providing artillery cover for Marines landing on Guadalcanal, Marshall Islands, Iwo Jima, and Okinawa. Rivero eventually reached the rank of Full-Admiral (four-stars) and in October 1962, found himself in the middle of the Cuban Missile Crisis. As Commander of amphibious forces, Atlantic Fleet, he was on the front line of the vessels sent to the Caribbean by President Kennedy to stop the Cold War from escalating into World War III.
- Rear Admiral Edmund Ernest García, USN, was the commander of the destroyer USS Sloat and saw action in the invasions of Africa, Sicily, and France.
- Rear Admiral Jose M. Cabanillas, USN, was an executive officer of the battleship USS Texas, which participated in the invasions of North Africa and Normandy (D-Day) during World War II. In 1945, he became the first commanding officer of USS Grundy.
- Rear Admiral Frederick Lois Riefkohl, USN, was a World War I Navy Cross recipient who served as captain of the cruiser USS Vincennes during World War II. Vincennes was engaged in combat against a fleet of Japanese ships just off Guadalcanal and received 85 direct hits. Riefkohl ordered his men to abandon ship. The sailors manned the life rafts; among them was Ensign C. Kenneth Ruiz, who later become a submarine commander.
- Rear Admiral Henry G. Sanchez, USN, commanded (as a Lieutenant Commander) VF-72, an F4F squadron of 37 aircraft, on board USS Hornet from July to October 1942. His squadron was responsible for shooting down 38 Japanese airplanes during his command tour, which included the Battle of the Santa Cruz Islands.
- Colonel Virgilio N. Cordero Jr., USA, was the Battalion Commander of the 31st Infantry Regiment in the Philippines. Survivor of the infamous Bataan Death March, he was awarded three Silver Star Medals and a Bronze Star Medal.

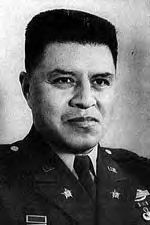
Colonel Louis Gonzaga Mendez Jr.

- Colonel Louis Gonzaga Mendez Jr., USA, a Mexican American, Spanish and Navajo Indian, was born in Trinidad, Colorado. He graduated top of his class in high school. After serving in the Civilian Conservation Corps (CC). Governor Bob Carr appointed to the United States Military Academy at West Point, New York. He graduated from West Point in the Class of 1940, commissioned a Second Lieutenant, United States. Mendez earned his Parachutist Badge after attending the Army's United States Army Airborne School. In June 1944, as commander of the 3rd Battalion, 508th Parachute Infantry Regiment during World War II, parachuted behind enemy lines into Normandy and was awarded a Distinguished Service Cross for leading an attack that captured the French town of Prétot-Sainte-Suzanne, in the Manche (Basse-Normandie) department. On June 6, 2002, the people of the village honored his memory by renaming Prétot's main square "La Place du Colonel Mendez". He was also the recipient of 3 Bronze Star Medals.
- Colonel Virgil R. Miller, USA, native of San German, Puerto Rico, was the Regimental Commander of the 442d Regimental Combat Team, a unit which was composed of "Nisei" (second generation Americans of Japanese descent), during World War II. He led the 442nd in its rescue of the Lost Texas Battalion of the 36th Infantry Division, in the forests of the Vosges Mountains in northeastern France.
- Colonel Jaime Sabater Sr., USMC, commanded the 1st Battalion, 9th Marines during the Bougainville amphibious operations of World War II. Sabater also participated in the Battle of Guam (July 21 – August 10, 1944) as Executive officer of the 9th Marines. On July 21, 1944, he was wounded in action and awarded the Purple Heart.
- Lieutenant Colonel Chester J. Salazar, USMC, was the commanding officer of the 2d Battalion, 18th Marines. Salazar served as commanding officer the unit in the Gilbert Islands which fought in the Battle of Tarawa and later in the Battles of Saipan and Tinian.

=== Submarine commanders ===
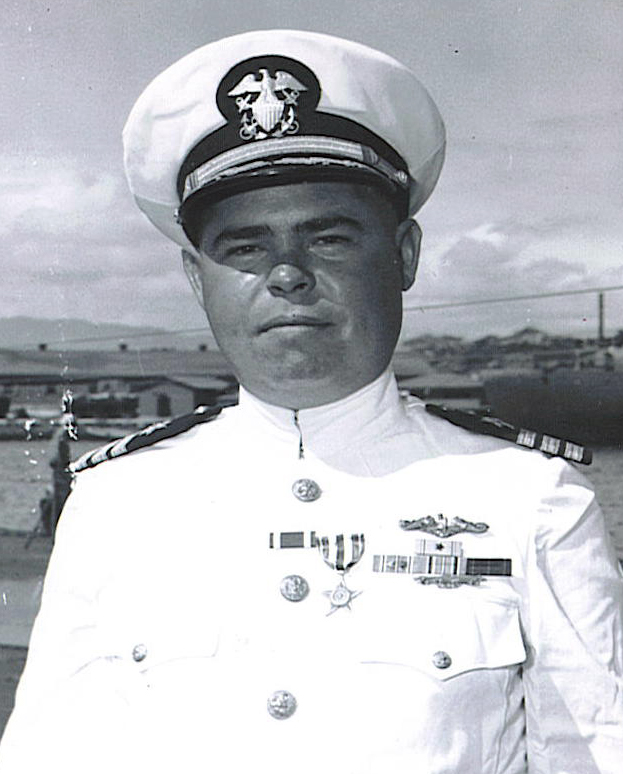
Captain Marion Frederic Ramírez de Arellano

Captain Marion Frederic Ramírez de Arellano, (1913–1980) USN, the first Hispanic submarine commanding officer, participated in five war patrols. He led the effort to rescue five navy pilots and one enlisted gunner off Wake Island, and contributed to the sinking of two Japanese freighters and damaging a third. For his actions, he was awarded a Silver Stars Medal and a Legion of Merit Medal.

After a brief stint at the Mare Island Naval Shipyard, he was reassigned to USS Skate, a Balao-class submarine. He participated in Skate's first three war patrols and was awarded a second Silver Star Medal for his contribution in sinking the Japanese light cruiser Agano on his third patrol. Agano had survived a previous torpedo attack by submarine USS Scamp.

In April 1944, Ramirez de Arellano was named commanding officer of USS Balao. He participated in his boat's fifth, sixth and seventh war patrols. On July 5, 1944, Ramirez de Arellano led the rescue of three downed wavy pilots in the Palau area. On December 4, 1944, Balao departed from Pearl Harbor to patrol in the Yellow Sea. Balao engaged and sunk the Japanese cargo ship Daigo Maru on January 8, 1945. Ramirez de Arellano was awarded a Bronze Star Medal with Combat V and a Letter of Commendation.

Among the Hispanic submarine commanders were Rear Admiral Rafael Celestino Benítez and Captain C. Kenneth Ruiz.

Rear Admiral Rafael Celestino Benítez, USN, was a lieutenant commander who saw action aboard submarines and on various occasions weathered depth charge attacks. For his actions, he was awarded the Silver and Bronze Star Medals. Benitez would go on to play an important role in the first American undersea spy mission of the Cold War as commander of the submarine USS Cochino in what became known as the "Cochino Incident".

Captain Charles Kenneth Ruiz, USN, was a crew member of the cruiser USS Vincennes, during the Battle of Savo Island. After being rescued at sea and sent to Pearl Harbor, he was invited by Admiral Chester Nimitz to join the Submarine Service. He served with distinction aboard the submarine USS Pollack and participated in eight war patrols in the hostile waters of the Pacific during World War II and on.

== Military honors ==
=== Recipients of the Medal of Honor ===
The Medal of Honor is the highest military decoration in the United States bestowed "for conspicuous gallantry and intrepidity at the risk of life, above and beyond the call of duty, in actual combat against an armed enemy force." The medal is awarded by the President of the United States on behalf of the Congress. Joe P. Martinez was the first of 17 Hispanic Medal of Honor recipients during World War II. His posthumous award was the first for heroism in combat on American soil (other than Pearl Harbor) since the American Indian Wars.

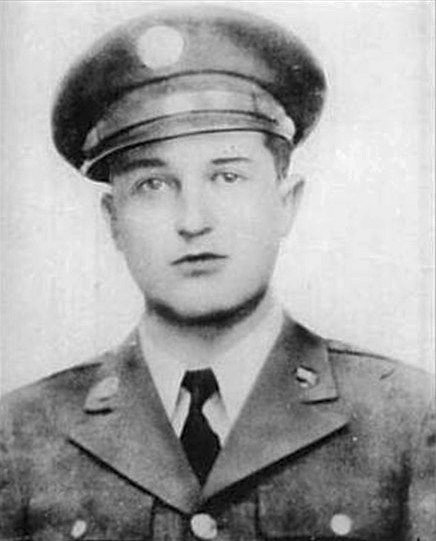
Private Joseph Pantillion Martinez

Prior to March 18, 2014, there were a total of 13 Hispanic Medal of Honor recipients awarded for their actions in World War II. On February 21, 2014, President Barack Obama announced that on March 18 that year, 4 Hispanics who served in World War II would have their Distinguished Service Cross Medals upgraded to the Medal of Honor in a ceremony at the White House. They are: Pvt. Pedro Cano, Pvt. Joe Gandara, Pfc. Salvador J. Lara and Staff Sgt. Manuel V. Mendoza. The award came through the Defense Authorization Act which called for a review of Jewish American and Hispanic American veterans from World War II, the Korean War and the Vietnam War to ensure that no prejudice was shown to those deserving the Medal of Honor.

Of the 17 Medals of Honor awarded to Hispanics, ten were awarded posthumously. Texas accounted for the most Hispanic Medal of Honor recipients in World War II with a total of five (Marcario Garcia was raised in Sugar Land, Texas). The 17 recipients are:

1. Lucian Adams: United States Army. Born in Port Arthur, Texas. Place and Date of Action: St. Die, France, October 1944.
2. Pedro Cano*: United States Army. Born in La Morita, Mexico. For courageous actions during combat operations in Schevenhutte, Germany, on Dec. 3, 1944.
3. Rudolph B. Davila: United States Army. Born in El Paso, Texas. Place and Date of Action: Artena, Italy, May 28, 1944. Davila was of Hispanic-Filipino descent and the only person of Filipino ancestry to receive the medal for his actions in the war in Europe.
4. Joe Gandara*: United States Army. Born in Santa Monica, California. For courageous actions during combat operations in Amfreville, France, on June 9, 1944.
5. Marcario Garcia: United States Army. Born in Villa de Castano, Mexico. Place and Date of Action: Near Grosshau, Germany, November 27, 1944. Garcia was the first Mexican national Medal of Honor recipient.
6. Harold Gonsalves*: United States Marine Corps. Born in Alameda, California. Place and Date of Action: Ryūkyū Chain, Okinawa, April 15, 1945.
7. David M. Gonzales*: United States Army. Born in Pacoima, California. Place and Date of Action: Villa Verde Trail, Luzon, Philippine Islands, April 25, 1945.
8. Silvestre S. Herrera: United States Army. Born in Camargo, Chihuahua, Mexico. Place and Date of Action: Near Mertzwiller, France, March 15, 1945. At the time of his death, Herrera had been the only living person authorized to wear the Medal of Honor and Mexico's equivalent Premier Merito Militar (Order of Military Merit), Mexico's highest award for valor. Herrera was a Mexican citizen by birth.
9. Salvador J. Lara*: United States Army. From Riverside, California. For courageous actions during combat operations in Aprilia, Italy, May 27–28, 1944.
10. Jose M. Lopez: United States Army. Born in Mission, Texas. Place and Date of Action: Near Krinkelt, Belgium, December 17, 1944.
11. Joe P. Martinez*: United States Army. Born in Taos, New Mexico. Place and Date of Action: Attu, Aleutians, May 26, 1943. Martinez was the first Hispanic American posthumously awarded the Medal of Honor for combat heroism on American soil during World War II.
12. Manuel V. Mendoza*: United States Army. Born in Miami, Arizona. For courageous actions during combat operations on Mount Battaglia, Italy, on Oct. 4, 1944.
13. Manuel Perez Jr.*: United States Army. Born in Oklahoma City, Oklahoma. Place and Date of Action: Fort William McKinley, Luzon, Philippine Islands, February 13, 1945.
14. Cleto L. Rodriguez: United States Army. Born in San Marcos, Texas. Place and Date of Action: Paco Railroad Station, Manila, Philippine Islands, February 9, 1945.
15. Alejandro R. Ruiz: United States Army. Born in Loving, New Mexico. Place and Date of Action: Okinawa, Japan, April 28, 1945.
16. Jose F. Valdez*: United States Army. Born in Governador, New Mexico. Place and Date of Action: Rosenkrantz, France, January 25, 1945.
17. Ysmael R. Villegas*: United States Army. Born in Casa Blanca, California. Place and Date of Action: Villa Verde Trail, Luzon, Philippine Islands, March 20, 1945.

* Awarded posthumously.

=== Additional decorations ===
Hispanic Americans: U.S. Armed Forces Awards in World War II	Number
Medal of Honor	17
Distinguished Service Cross	140
Navy Cross	25
Legion of Merit	323
Silver Star	2006
Bronze Star	1352
Distinguished Flying Cross	55
Purple Heart	3378
Air Medal	237

Hispanics were recipients of every major U.S. military decoration during World War II; they have also been honored with military awards from other countries. Thirty-one Hispanic-Americans were awarded the Belgian Croix de guerre and three Hispanic-Americans received the French Croix de guerre. The figures in the following table were derived from the book Undaunted Courage Mexican American Patriots Of World War II published in 2005 by Latino Advocates for Education, Inc. and according to Rogelio C. Rodriguez of the LAE, the figures are based on listings of military service personnel that have been compiled from military records, historical documentation, or personal accounts.

=== Hero Street, USA ===
In the Midwest town of Silvis, Illinois, the former Second Street is now known as Hero Street USA. The muddy block and a half long street was home to Mexican immigrants who worked for the Rock Island Railroad. The 22 families who lived on the street were a close-knit group. From this small street, 84 men served in World War II, Korea, and Vietnam. The street contributed more men to military services in World War II and Korea than any other street of comparable size in the U.S. In total, eight men from Hero Street gave their lives during World War II—Joseph Gomez, Peter Macias, Johnny Muños, Tony Pompa, Frank Sandoval, Joseph "Joe" Sandoval, William "Willie" Sandoval, and Claro Solis. Second Street's name was changed to Hero Street in honor of these men and their families.

Of the 22 families on Second Street, the two Sandoval families had a total of thirteen men who served in the armed forces. Three died in service during World War II. The Sandovals were two families of Mexican immigrants, with the same surname and lived on Second Street.

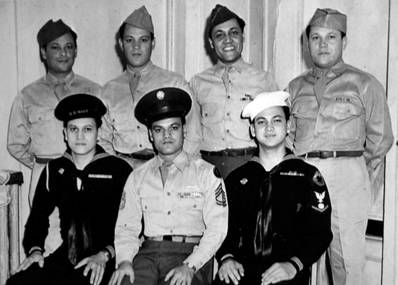
"The Fighting Medinas"

Eduvigis and Angelina Sandoval immigrated to the U.S. from Romita, Mexico. Their son, Frank, was a combat engineer assigned to help build the Ledo Road in Burma. He was killed when his unit was sent unexpectedly to the front to fight for control of a key airbase. His older brother, Joe, was assigned to the 41st Armored Infantry Division in Europe. He was killed in April 1945, just days before the war ended.

Joseph and Carmen Sandoval also immigrated to the United States from Mexico. When the war broke out, their son Willie asked for permission to enlist in the army, and both parents consented to their son's request. Willie Sandoval was trained as a paratrooper and was assigned to the 82nd Airborne Division. He fought in Italy and Germany, and was killed on October 6, 1944, during a combat mission related to Operation Market-Garden, the largest airborne operation of all time.

Other families like the Sandovals had multiple members join the Armed Forces. The Banuelo family, originally from Mexico and who resided in Los Angeles, California, the Garcia family from Los Angeles, California, the Hernandez family from Poteet, Texas, and the Mora family from Laredo, Texas, each had six siblings who served in the military during the war. The Nevarez family, from Los Angeles, California, had a total of eight siblings serving in the armed forces. Seven brothers of the Medina family known as "The fighting Medinas", fought in the war. They came from Rio Grande, Puerto Rico, and Brooklyn, New York.

== Home front ==
Some Hispanics in the entertainment business served in the United Service Organizations (USO), which provided entertainment to help troop morale. One notable USO entertainer was Desi Arnaz, the Cuban bandleader who starred opposite Lucille Ball in the television show I Love Lucy. When he was drafted into the army in 1943, he was classified for limited service because of a prior knee injury. As a result, he was assigned to direct the U.S.O. programs at a military hospital in the San Fernando Valley, California, where he served until 1945.

Hispanic Americans who lived in the mainland benefited from the sudden economic boom as a result of the war, and the doors opened for many of the migrants who were searching for jobs. After the war, many Puerto Ricans migrated to the United States to find work.

Hispanic women were discouraged from working outside the home prior to World War II, even more than other American women. During World War II, the broad changes in the role of women caused by a need for labor on the home front affected the role of Hispanic women, who worked as secretaries and nurses, helped build airplanes, made ammunition in factories, and worked in shipyards.

Isabel Solis-Thomas and Elvia Solis were born in Veracruz, Veracruz, Mexico. The Solis family immigrated to the United States and moved to Brownsville, Texas. When World War II broke out, both sisters volunteered to become "Rosies", welding pipes and repairing cargo ships by the war's end with women of all races from all over the country. Mrs. Solis-Thomas said recruiters wanted women who were small, short and thin for crawling into dangerous places in the ships. She said she worked nine-hour days, six days a week, striking and sealing steel rods with precision and purpose.

Josephine Ledesma, from Austin, Texas, was 24 when the war broke out and worked as an airplane mechanic from 1942 to 1944. When her husband, Alfred, was drafted she decided to volunteer to work as an airplane mechanic. Even though the army waived her husband's duty, she was sent to train at Randolph Air Force Base, Texas, where she was the only Mexican-American woman on the base. After her training, she was sent to Bergstrom Air Field. There were two other women, both non-Hispanic, at Bergstrom Air Field, and several more in Big Spring, all working in the sheet metal department. At Big Spring, she was the only woman working in the hangar. She worked as a mechanic between from 1942 to 1944.

== Discrimination ==
=== In the military ===
During World War II, the United States Army was segregated, and Hispanics were categorized as white. Hispanics, including the Puerto Ricans who resided on the mainland, served alongside their "white" counterparts, while those who were "black" served in units mostly made up of African-Americans. The majority of the Puerto Ricans from the island served in Puerto Rico's segregated units, like the 65th Infantry and the Puerto Rico National Guard's 285th and 296th regiments.

Discrimination against Hispanics has been documented in several first-person accounts by Hispanic soldiers who fought in World War II. Private First Class Raul Rios Rodriguez, a Puerto Rican, said that one of his drill instructors was particularly harsh on the Hispanic and black soldiers in his unit during his basic training at Fort Bragg. Private First Class Felix Lopez-Santos, another Puerto Rican, said that he observed some racial discrimination against African Americans, but that he never experienced discrimination himself because of his light eyes and fair complexion. Private First Class Norberto Gonzalez, a Cuban-born New Yorker, experienced discrimination in his all-white battalion, where he was frequently asked about his name and place of birth, and found he was treated differently once fellow soldiers learned he was Hispanic. After being transferred to a black battalion on request, he no longer faced the same problems. Corporal Alfonso Rodriguez, a Mexican-American born in Santa Fe, New Mexico, said that he first experienced racial discrimination during recruit training. A white soldier once demanded that the Rodriguez and other Latinos stop speaking Spanish and speak English, "like Americans", and Rodriguez was involved in several physical altercations stemming from the incident. Rodriguez was also often referred to using racial insults such as "smart-ass Mexican."

=== After returning home ===
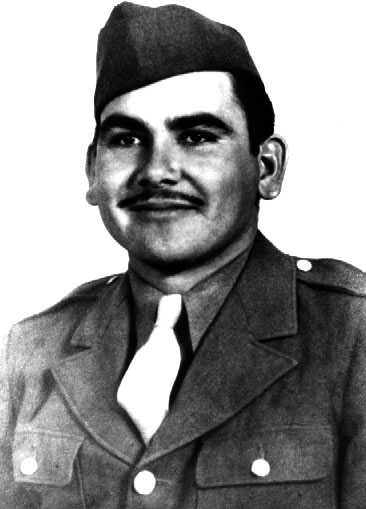
Pvt. Felix Longoria Jr.

After returning home, Hispanic soldiers experienced the same discrimination felt by other Hispanic Americans. According to one former Hispanic soldier, "There was the same discrimination in Grand Falls (Texas), if not worse" than when he had departed. While Hispanics could work for $2 per day, whites could get jobs working in petroleum fields that earned $18 per day. In his town, signs read "No Mexicans, whites only", and only one restaurant would serve Hispanics. The American GI Forum was started to ensure the rights of Hispanic World War II veterans.

Discrimination also extended to those killed during the war. In one notable case, the owner of a funeral parlor refused to allow the family of Private Felix Longoria, a soldier killed in action in the Philippines, to use his facility because "whites would not like it". Then-U.S. Senator Lyndon B. Johnson and Hector P. Garcia, the Mexican-American World War II veteran who founded the American G.I. Forum, intervened on Longoria's behalf. Johnson, Lady Bird Johnson, Congressman John Lyle, and President Truman's military aide Gen. Harry H. Vaughan joined the Longoria family for a full military burial with honors at Arlington National Cemetery on February 16, 1949. Johnson stated of the incident, "This injustice and prejudice is deplorable. I am happy to have a part seeing that this Texas hero is laid to rest with the honor and dignity his service deserves."

== Post-war commemoration ==
The memory of Hispanic American heroes has been honored in various ways: some of their names can be found on ships, in parks and inscribed on monuments. Captain Linda Garcia Cubero (USAF), while serving as Special Assistant to the Deputy Secretary of Defense, supervised the development of a United States commemorative stamp to honor Hispanics who served in America's defense. The stamp was designed to honor the ten Hispanic Medal of Honor recipients still alive and was unveiled on October 31, 1984.

Latino organizations and writers documented the Hispanic experience in World War II, most notably the U.S. Latino & Latina World War II Oral History Project, launched by Professor Maggie Rivas-Rodriguez of the University of Texas.

The failure of the Ken Burns World War II documentary The War, which aired on PBS in September 2007, to mention Hispanic contributions to the war spurred protests by the Hispanic community. Officials in PBS announced that Burns' documentary would include additional content incorporating the Hispanic contributions to the war effort as result of public pressure.

== See also ==
- Hispanics and Latinos in the United States Marine Corps
- Hispanics and Latinos in the United States Navy
- Hispanics and Latinos in the United States Coast Guard
- Hispanics and Latinos in the American Civil War
- Hispanics and Latinos in the United States Air Force
