= Perry Picasshoe =

American artist

Neveah Marquez
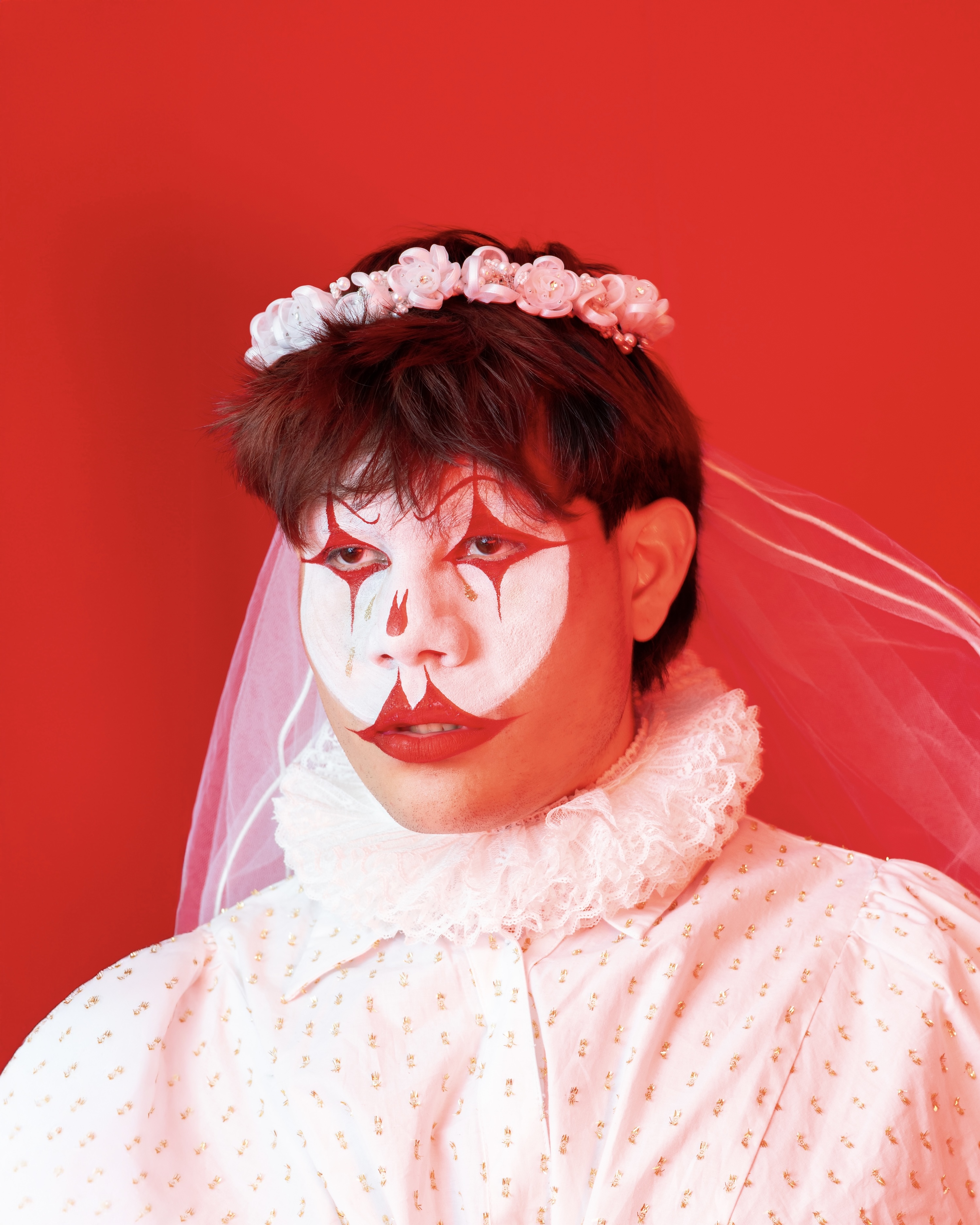
- Born: Juan Carlos Hernandez Marquez; Anaheim Hills, California, U.S.
- Education: University of California, Los Angeles (BA)
- Occupation: Artist
- Known for: Painting, photography, social media influencer, textile art, performance art, apparel designer
- Website: www.perrypicasshoe.com

Neveah Marquez (formerly known as Perry Picasshoe) is an American Chicana visual artist and social media personality. She is known for her work in oil painting, photographs, performance art, and apparel design. Marquez lives in Riverside, California.

== Biography ==
Neveah Marquez was born in Anaheim Hills, but has spent most of her life in Riverside, California. Her birth name is Juan Carlos Hernandez Marquez. During the beginning of her career, Marquez went by the pseudonym Perry Picasshoe, a name she came up with as a teenager inspired by the artist Pablo Picasso as well as the online trending term “art hoe”. She is Mexican American Chicana, and identifies as queer and transgender. In September 2026, she came out publicly as a transgender woman through a Los Angeles Times article, where she also announced that she was changing her name to Neveah Marquez. Her name change was inspired by her painting, Neveah, and her mother's maiden name.

She studied visual arts at the University of California, Los Angeles (UCLA, BA degree class of 2022). During her time in college she suffered multiple panic attacks, which inspired many of her earlier works.

== Career ==
Her painting, Neveah, was the first large-scale oil painting Marquez had ever done, which has also become one of her most well-known works. Neveah depicts what it feels to be living a nightmare and dream simultaneously. The background of sunflowers and bright colors convey a sense of joy, but the small inconsistencies hidden throughout the painting reveal something is wrong. She found the canvas she used to paint this art piece in a trash can at UCLA.

Marquez first gained popularity on TikTok, the social media platform.

Marquez is also known for her ice block installation artworks following the nationwide ICE raids. She wanted to represent undocumented people who were taken away unexpectedly and without reason. She saw how much fear and vulnerability was circulating among many of the impacted families and wanted to bring more attention to these struggling communities. Her primary installation series was conducted in Southern California, where she and her father strategically placed 36 large ice blocks in 9 areas around the Inland Empire. In each of these areas, they placed 4 ice blocks, which corresponded to places where ICE raids had occurred in previous weeks. Marquez watched documented the ice installations with a set of pictures as the ice blocks melted in the summer heat. Her intention was to make viewers confront the reality of the ongoing ICE raids. She also created an ice installation in New York City, where she laid an American flag on the ground and placed an ice block on top of it, directly across from the Trump Tower.

Marquez had her work exhibited at the Delaware Contemporary for the show "Creative Influence(r)", which ran from January 17, 2026 to April 26, 2026.

Her first solo museum exhibition, "SagradX", is being held at the Riverside Art Museum and runs from September 5, 2026 to January 31, 2027. The title transforms the gendered Spanish words sagrado/a through the open-ended X, in an act that is both linguistic and political to expand the sacred beyond fixed categories of gender, religion and institutional authority. The show aims to collapse the boundaries between the sacredness of private and public life through the interactions of the personal, Queer, Latinx and institutional. Across painting, durational performance, photography, sculpture and installation, Marquez searches for enduring and ephemeral ways to capture, preserve and present what is held sacred.
