= Ysmael R. Villegas =

American Medal of Honor recipient (1924–1945)

Ysmael Reyes Villegas
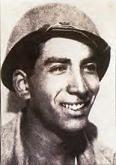
- Staff Sergeant Ysmael R. Villegas, Medal of Honor recipient
- Born: March 21, 1924; Casa Blanca, California, US
- Died: March 20, 1945 (aged 20); Luzon, Philippines
- Burial place: Riverside National Cemetery, Riverside, California
- Military career
- Allegiance: United States
- Branch: United States Army
- Service years: 1944–1945
- Rank: Staff Sergeant
- Nickname: Smiley
- Units: Company F, 127th Infantry Regiment, 32nd Infantry Division
- Conflicts: World War II; *Battle of Luzon †
- Awards: Medal of Honor; Silver Star; Purple Heart

Staff Sergeant Ysmael Reyes Villegas (March 21, 1924 – March 20, 1945), was a United States Army soldier who was posthumously awarded the Medal of Honor, the United States' highest military decoration, for heroism during World War II at the Battle of Luzon.

== Background ==
Villegas, a Mexican-American, was born on March 21, 1924, in Casa Blanca, a predominantly Hispanic neighborhood of Riverside, California, where he was raised and received his primary and secondary education. Villegas was the oldest of 13 children born to Dario and Inez (Reyes) Villegas. Both of his parents were native to Mexico as Dario was from Michoacán while Inez was from Torreón. Villegas' official commendation states that he was an “orange picker” prior to enlisting. At the time, orange production was a major industry in the Riverside area.

Villegas joined the United States Army in July 1944. After finishing basic training, he was assigned to Company F, 127th Infantry Regiment, 32nd Infantry Division which was assigned to the invasion of the Philippines.

Villegas, nicknamed “Smiley”, married Lillie Sanchez in 1944, a month before he was sent to war in the Pacific. Villegas never met their son who was born two weeks after Villegas was killed in action.

== World War II ==
On March 1, 1945, Villegas' company found itself engaged in combat against Japanese forces at Villa Verde Trail on Luzon Island in the Philippines, in what is known as the Battle of Luzon. His squad was attacked by an enemy machinegun nest, and Villegas took it upon himself to save his squad by destroying the nest and its occupants. For his actions, Villegas was awarded the Silver Star medal.

A few weeks later on March 20, the day before his 21st birthday, Villegas was ordered to lead his squad in an advance which would result in the taking of a hill. They confronted an enemy which was entrenched and who attacked them with heavy machinegun and rifle fire. Villegas led his men toward the crest of the hill and then attacked five enemy foxholes upon his own initiative, killing all of their occupants. Villegas was mortally wounded while attacking the sixth foxhole. His bravery inspired his troops to take the rest of the hill.

== Medal of Honor ==
On October 19, 1945, President Harry S. Truman posthumously awarded the Medal of Honor to Villegas. Less than two weeks later on November 1, the medal was presented to his widow by Col. G. B. Appleman at Camp Haan in Riverside, California. An estimated 2,000 people attended the ceremony.

Ysmael R. Villegas
Rank and organization:Staff Sergeant, U.S. Army, Company F, 127th Infantry, 32d Infantry Division.
Place and date: Villa Verde Trail, Luzon, Philippine Islands, March 20, 1945.
Entered service at:Casa Blanca, California
Born: March 21, 1924 at Casa Blanca, California
G.O. No.: 89, October 19, 1945.
Citation:

He was a squad leader when his unit, in a forward position, clashed with an enemy strongly entrenched in connected caves and foxholes on commanding ground. He moved boldly from man to man, in the face of bursting grenades and demolition charges, through heavy machinegun and rifle fire, to bolster the spirit of his comrades. Inspired by his gallantry, his men pressed forward to the crest of the hill. Numerous enemy riflemen, refusing to flee, continued firing from their foxholes. S/Sgt. Villegas, with complete disregard for his own safety and the bullets which kicked up the dirt at his feet, charged an enemy position, and, firing at point-blank range killed the Japanese in a foxhole. He rushed a second foxhole while bullets missed him by inches, and killed 1 more of the enemy. In rapid succession he charged a third, a fourth, a fifth foxhole, each time destroying the enemy within. The fire against him increased in intensity, but he pressed onward to attack a sixth position. As he neared his goal, he was hit and killed by enemy fire. Through his heroism and indomitable fighting spirit, S/Sgt. Villegas, at the cost of his life, inspired his men to a determined attack in which they swept the enemy from the field.

== Military Awards and decorations ==
Among Staff Sergeant Ysmael R. Villegas' decorations and medals were the following:

Combat Infantryman Badge
Medal of Honor
Silver Star	Purple Heart	American Campaign Medal
Asiatic-Pacific Campaign Medal	World War II Victory Medal	Philippine Liberation Medal

== In Memoriam ==
Villegas was initially buried in 1949 at Olivewood Cemetery in Riverside. However, his remains were reinterred to become the first veteran buried at the Riverside National Cemetery when that cemetery opened on November 11, 1978.

Villegas was the first Riverside County resident to receive the Medal of Honor. The city of Riverside has recognized his heroism in a number of ways.

- In 1952, the city formally named a park located in the Casa Blanca neighborhood Ysmael Villegas Park.
- The Veterans of Foreign Wars (VFW) named Post #184 in Riverside the “Ysmael R. Villegas Memorial Casa Blanca Post” in his honor.
- A statue by sculptor Gary E. Coulter, called Villegas Memorial, was dedicated on May 27, 1995, and is located on Main Street Civic Center Courtyard in Riverside.
- Ysmael R. Villegas Middle School in Riverside is named in his honor.

== See also ==
- List of Medal of Honor recipients for World War II
- Hispanic Medal of Honor recipients
- Hispanic Americans in World War II
- David M. Gonzales, also a 32d Infantry Division Medal of Honor recipient
- Salvador J. Lara, also a World War II Medal of Honor recipient from Riverside
- Jesus S. Duran, a Vietnam War Medal of Honor recipient from Riverside
