= Salvador J. Lara =

United States Army Medal of Honor recipient (1920–1945)

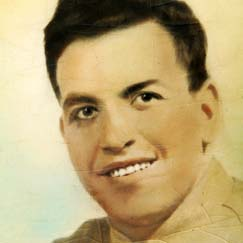
- Born: July 11, 1920; Riverside, California, US
- Died: September 1, 1945 (aged 25) near Aprilia, Italy
- Burial place: Lorraine American Cemetery and Memorial
- Military career
- Allegiance: United States
- Branch: United States Army
- Rank: Staff Sergeant
- Nickname: Chavo
- Units: 180th Infantry Regiment, 45th Infantry Division; 602d Ordnance Armament Maintenance Battalion
- Conflicts: World War II
- Awards: Medal of Honor; Bronze Star Medal; Purple Heart

Staff Sergeant Salvador J. Lara (July 11, 1920 – September 1, 1945) was a U.S. Army veteran of World War II and recipient of the Medal of Honor. He was of Mexican-American descent.

== Background ==
Lara was born in Riverside, California and raised in the neighborhood of Casa Blanca. He was the son of Juan and Isabel (Herrera) Lara, and worked in Riverside's citrus production before enlisting with the United States Army in Los Angeles on July 29, 1942. He never married and had no children.

In May 1944, Lara was wounded in action during the Italian campaign while serving as the squad leader of a rifle squad. Despite his injuries, Lara continued to lead his squad taking multiple enemy strongholds. Lara's hometown newspaper reported his injury was sustained at the Anzio beachhead, which is about 10 miles (16 km) from Aprilia, the location of Lara's Medal of Honor citation.

Lara died on September 1, 1945, shortly after World War II ended, while serving with the 602d Ordnance Armament Maintenance Battalion in Europe.

== Medal of Honor ==
Lara's brother Alfonzo accepted the Medal of Honor on behalf of his late brother during a White House ceremony on March 18, 2014.

Members of Lara's family received the Medal of Honor flag from Secretary of Defense Chuck Hagel in a March 19, 2014, ceremony when Lara was inducted into the Pentagon Hall of Heroes. They received the actual medal from President Barack Obama at the White House the day before.

The award came through the Defense Authorization Act, which called for a review of Jewish and Hispanic veterans from World War II, the Korean War and the Vietnam War to ensure that no prejudice was shown to those deserving the Medal of Honor.

According to Lara's U.S. Army biography:

Then-Pfc. Salvador Lara was bestowed the Medal of Honor to recognize his valorous actions in Aprilia, Italy, May 27–28, 1944. During the fight, May 27, he aggressively led his rifle squad in neutralizing multiple enemy strong points and inflicting large numbers of casualties on the enemy. The next morning, as his company resumed the attack, Lara sustained a severe leg wound, but did not stop to receive first aid. Lara continued his exemplary performance until he captured his objective.

== Awards and decorations ==
Lara's awards include:

1st row	Medal of Honor		
2nd row	Bronze Star Medal	Purple Heart with oak leaf cluster	Army Good Conduct Medal
3rd row	American Campaign Medal	European–African–Middle Eastern Campaign Medal with two campaign stars	World War II Victory Medal

== In Memoriam ==
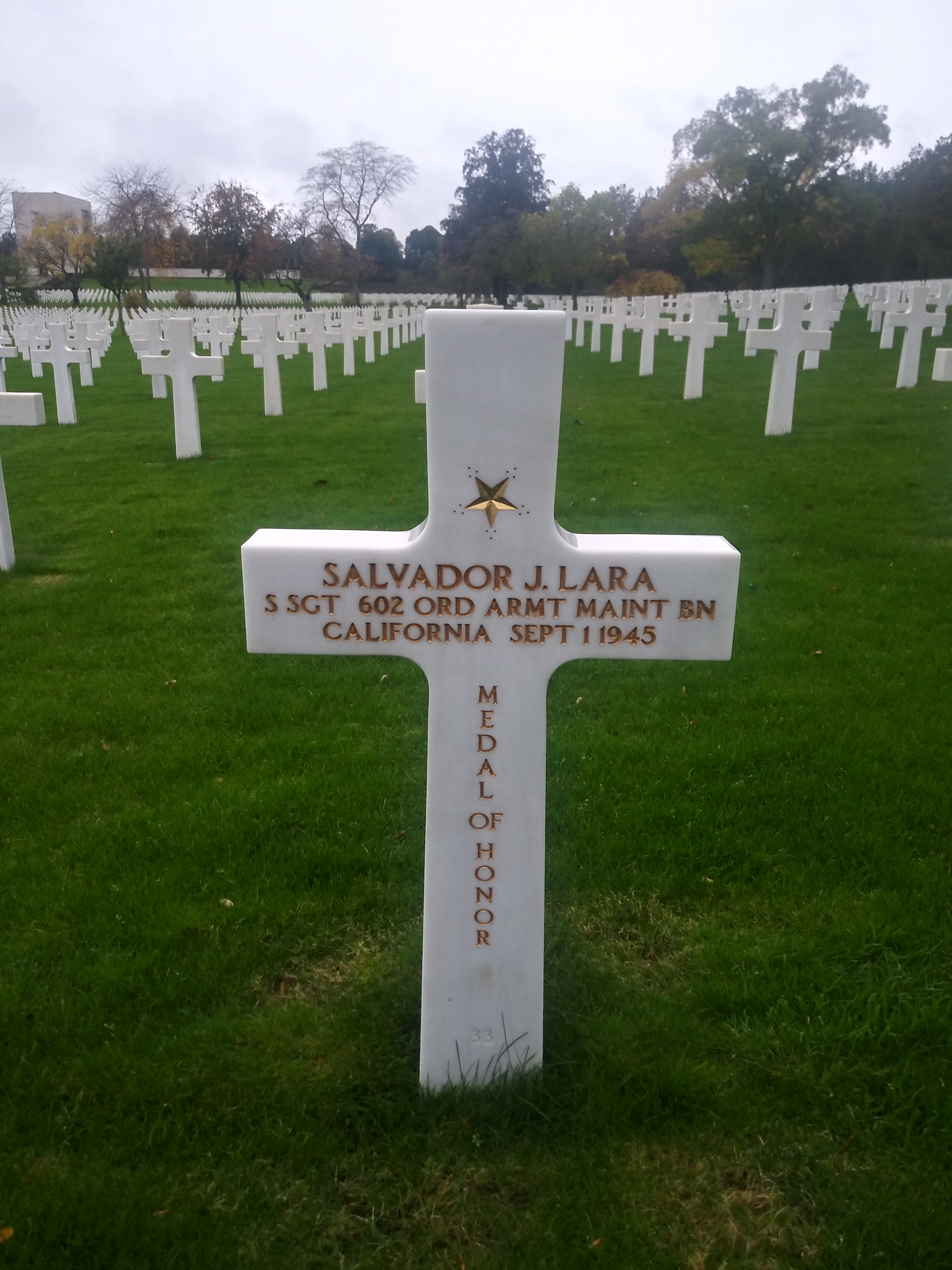
Gravesite, Lorraine American Cemetery, France

Lara's burial monument is located at Plot F Row 17 Grave 33 of the Lorraine American Cemetery and Memorial in Saint-Avold, Moselle, France, a site administered by the American Battle Monuments Commission.

The SSgt. Salvador J. Lara Casa Blanca Library in Riverside, opened in 2003, is named in Lara's honor.

== See also ==
- List of Medal of Honor recipients for World War II
- Hispanic Medal of Honor recipients
- Hispanic Americans in World War II
- Ysmael R. Villegas, also a World War II Medal of Honor recipient from Riverside
- Jesus S. Duran, a Vietnam War Medal of Honor recipient from Riverside
