= Jesus S. Duran =

US Army Medal of Honor recipient (1948–1977)

Coordinates: 33.95538°N 117.37687°W

Jesus Santiago Duran
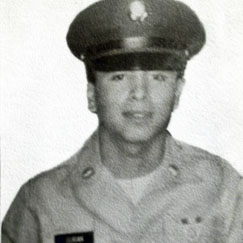
- Duran during his time of service
- Born: July 26, 1948; Juárez, Mexico
- Died: February 17, 1977 (aged 28); Riverside, California, U.S.
- Burial place: Olivewood Memorial Park, Riverside, California
- Military career
- Allegiance: United States
- Branch: United States Army
- Service years: 1968–1970
- Rank: Sergeant
- Units: Company E, 2nd Battalion, 5th Cavalry Regiment, 1st Air Cavalry Division (Airmobile)
- Conflicts: Vietnam War
- Awards: Medal of Honor; Bronze Star Medal; Air Medal

Jesus Santiago Duran (July 26, 1948 – February 17, 1977) was a U.S. Army veteran of the Vietnam War, and a recipient of the Medal of Honor.

== Biography ==
Duran was born, July 26, 1948, in Juarez, Mexico. He was the sixth of twelve siblings.

Duran joined the U.S. Army on May 13, 1968, and was assigned to Company E, 2nd Battalion, 5th Cavalry, 1st Cavalry Division (Airmobile) to support Search and Destroy missions. During his service in the Vietnam war, his actions resulted in him being awarded, posthumously in 2014, the Medal of Honor.

After leaving the military, Duran pursued a career as a corrections officer at a juvenile detention center in San Bernardino, California, dedicating personal time to mentoring youths and leading them on educational trips. He married twice and had two children. Duran died on February 17, 1977, and is buried at Olivewood Memorial Park in Riverside, California.

== Medal of Honor ==
Duran's daughter, Tina Duran-Ruvalcaba, received the Medal of Honor on his behalf from President Barack Obama in a March 18, 2014 White House ceremony. The following day, she received the Medal of Honor flag from Secretary of Defense, Chuck Hagel, in a ceremony where Duran was inducted into the Pentagon Hall of Heroes.

The award came through the Defense Authorization Act which called for a review of Jewish American and Hispanic American veterans from World War II, the Korean War and the Vietnam War to ensure that no prejudice was shown to those deserving the Medal of Honor.

=== Citation ===

The President of the United States of America, authorized by Act of Congress, July 9, 1918 (amended by act of July 25, 1963), takes pride in presenting the Medal of Honor (posthumously) to:

JESUS S. DURAN
United States Army

For conspicuous gallantry and intrepidity at the risk of his life above and beyond the call of duty:

Specialist Four Jesus S. Duran distinguished himself by acts of gallantry and intrepidity above and beyond the call of duty while serving as an acting M-60 machinegunner in Company E, 2d Battalion, 5th Cavalry, 1st Cavalry Division (Airmobile) during combat operations against an armed enemy in the Republic of Vietnam on April 10, 1969. That afternoon, the reconnaissance platoon was moving into an elaborate enemy bunker complex when the lead elements began taking concentrated ambush fire from every side. The command post was in imminent danger of being overrun. With an M-60 machinegun blazing from his hip, Specialist Four Duran rushed forward and assumed a defensive position near the command post. As hostile forces stormed forward, Specialist Four Duran stood tall in a cloud of dust raised by the impacting rounds and bursting grenades directed towards him and thwarted the enemy with devastating streams of machinegun fire. Learning that two seriously wounded troopers lay helplessly pinned down under harassing fire, Specialist Four Duran assaulted the suppressive enemy positions, firing deadly bursts on the run. Mounting a log, he fired directly into the enemy's foxholes, eliminating four and cutting down several others as they fled. Specialist Four Duran then continued to pour effective fire on the disorganized and fleeing enemy. Specialist Four Duran's extraordinary heroism and selflessness above and beyond the call of duty are in keeping with the highest traditions of military service and reflect great credit upon himself, his unit and the United States Army.

== Legacy ==
Jesus Duran is the protagonist of two award-winning documentaries directed by filmmaker Andrés Gallegos: From Mexico to Vietnam: A Chicano Story (2022) and the short documentary Immigrant Service: Focus on Jesus Duran (2021), both titles were produced by El Dorado Films in association with the Veteran Documentary Corps.

From Mexico to Vietnam: A Chicano Story: After losing her father at an early age, Tina Duran explores the rich history of her father, the story of her ancestors who migrated from Mexico to the United States, and the implications the Vietnam War had on the Chicano & Latino community.

== Commendations ==
SGT Duran's awards included the following:

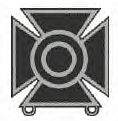
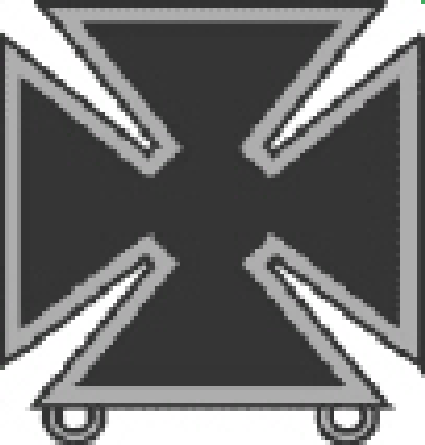

Badge	Combat Infantryman Badge		
1st row	Medal of Honor (upgraded from the Distinguished Service Cross)		
2nd row	Bronze Star	Air Medal	Army Good Conduct Medal
3rd row	National Defense Service Medal	Vietnam Service Medal with 4 bronze Campaign stars	Vietnam Campaign Medal
Badges	Sharpshooter Badge with Auto Rifle and Machine Gun component bars		Marksman Badge with Rifle component bar
Unit award	Vietnamese Gallantry Cross with frame and palm		

1 Service stripe
2 Overseas Service Bars

== See also ==
- List of Medal of Honor recipients for the Vietnam War
- Hispanic Medal of Honor recipients
- Ysmael R. Villegas, also a Medal of Honor recipient from Riverside
- Salvador J. Lara, also a Medal of Honor recipient from Riverside
