= Joshua Gil =

American restaurateur (1976–2026)

- Gil in 2025
- Born: January 17, 1976; Riverside, California, U.S.
- Died: June 22, 2026 (aged 50)
- Occupation: Restaurateur

Joshua Gil (January 17, 1976 – June 22, 2026) was an American restaurateur.

== Early life and career ==
Gil was born in Riverside, California, the son of Gabriel and Nellie Gil. He was raised in Rosarito, Baja California. He worked as a chef de cuisine at Joe's Restaurant in Venice, California in 2008, and earned the Michelin Star for the restaurant. In 2009, he co-founded Supper Liberation Front, a supper club.

In 2013, Gil opened Tacos Punta Cabras, a Mexican cuisine restaurant in Santa Monica, California. According to Eater, his restaurant was named the "Best Taco Restaurant to ever open in the Westside City of Santa Monica". His restaurant closed in 2017. In 2022, he opened Los Mírate, a Mexican cuisine restaurant in Los Feliz, Los Angeles, California.

== Personal life and death ==
According to Los Angeles, Gil was engaged to Tharini Shanmugarajah until his death in 2026.

In 2022, Gil was diagnosed with stage II colorectal cancer. It progressed to stage IV in 2023. He died from the disease on June 22, 2026, at the age of 50.
