= Don O'Neill (artist) =

American painter

- Born: January 9, 1924; Buffalo, New York
- Died: June 27, 2007 (aged 83); Riverside, California
- Known for: Watercolors
- Awards: 2005 Elizabeth Callan Award; 2007 Elizabeth Callan Award
- Website: http://www.dononeill.com/

Don O'Neill (1924–2007) was a United States watercolor artist most noted for his depictions of historic downtown Riverside, California. An architect by trade, he began painting in the 1960s, and eventually became Riverside's premier watercolorist. O'Neill became the first resident of Southern California's Inland Empire to be accepted into the American Watercolor Society.

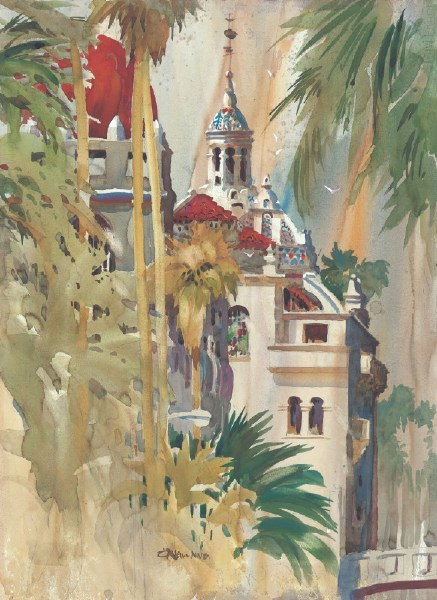
Don O'Neill, Mission Inn Towers. Watercolor, Riverside, California.

== Biography ==
Don O'Neill was born in 1924 in Buffalo, New York. He received his Bachelor of Architecture degree from Catholic University of America in Washington, DC in 1953, and was a practicing architect working in the Washington, DC and Riverside, California areas of the United States.

After retiring from architecture, O'Neill took up watercolor painting more seriously. He was taken on as a pupil of Milford Zornes, and eventually became a signature member of Watercolor West, the National Watercolor Society, and the American Watercolor Society, and was the first Inland Empire resident to ever be accepted into the American Watercolor Society.

O'Neill died of pancreatic cancer in 2007 at the age of 83.

== Recognition ==
Don O'Neill, Through Cypress. Watercolor, Riverside, California.

- 1982 Acquisition Award for Permanent Collection, Chaffey Community Art Association
- 1982 First Award, Inland Exhibition XVIII, San Bernardino Co. Museum
- 1983 First Award, 8th Annual Heritage Awards exhibit, Inland
- 1985 Acquisition Award for Permanent Collection, Mt San Jacinto College
- 1987 Accepted into 120th Annual Exhibit of American Watercolor Society. and received the Edgar Whitney Award
- 1988 Purchase Award for Permanent Collection, Palos Verdes Community Art Exhibit
- 1989 Artist-in-residence, Na Bolom, San Cristobal Las Casas, Mexico
- 1990 Harrison-Cady Award American Watercolor Society 123rd Annual Exhibition
- 1992 Accepted into 125th Annual Exhibit of the American Watercolor Society and granted Signature Membership
- 1994 Award of Excellence, Multi Media Mini XXV
- 1995 Best of Show Award, Riverside Art Museum Membership Exhibit
- 1997 Second Place Award, Multi Media Exhibit XXVIII
- 1999 Work accepted into the 132nd Annual Exhibition of the American Watercolor Society.
- 2005 Elizabeth Callan Award from the American Watercolor Society
- 2007 Elizabeth Callan Award from the American Watercolor Society

== See also ==
Don O'Neill, Fox Theatre. Watercolor, Riverside, California.

- Milford Zornes
- Watercolor painting
- American Watercolor Society
