= List of Hispanic Medal of Honor recipients =

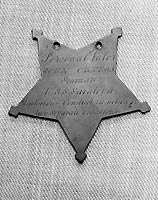
Reverse of the Medal of Honor awarded to Seaman John Ortega

The Medal of Honor was introduced during the American Civil War and is the highest military decoration presented by the United States government to a member of its armed forces. The recipient must have distinguished themselves at the risk of their own life above and beyond the call of duty in action against an enemy of the United States. Due to the nature of this medal, it is commonly presented posthumously.

Sixty-one (61) men of Hispanic heritage have been awarded the Medal of Honor. Of the sixty-one Medals of Honor presented to Hispanics, two were presented to members of the United States Navy, thirteen to members of the United States Marine Corps and forty-six to members of the United States Army. Forty-two Medals of Honor were presented posthumously.

The first recipient was Corporal Joseph H. De Castro of the Union Army for his actions at Gettysburg, Pennsylvania on July 3, 1863, during the American Civil War and the most recent recipient is Sergeant First Class Leroy Petry for his actions in Afghanistan. Corporal De Castro was a member of the Massachusetts Infantry, a militia that was not part of the "regular" army; however, Private David Bennes Barkley was a member of the regular army during World War I and has been recognized as the Army's first Hispanic Medal of Honor recipient. In 1864, Seaman John Ortega became the first Hispanic member of the U.S. Navy to receive the Medal of Honor and in 1900, Private France Silva became the first person of Hispanic descent in the U.S. Marine Corps to receive the medal. President Barack Obama awarded the Medal of Honor to 17 Hispanics on a March 18, 2014 in a ceremony in the White House. The award comes through the National Defense Authorization Act which called for a review of Jewish American and Hispanic American veterans from WWII, the Korean War and the Vietnam War to ensure that no prejudice was shown to those deserving the Medal of Honor.

Fifteen recipients were born outside the United States mainland, one each in Chile and Spain, five in Mexico and eight in Puerto Rico. Seaman Philip Bazaar from Chile received the medal in January 1865 and Seaman John Ortega from Spain in December 1865. The first native Mexican recipient was Staff Sergeant Marcario Garcia and the first Puerto Rican was PFC Fernando Luis Garcia. 1st Lt. Rudolph B. Davila, of Hispanic-Filipino descent, was the only person of Filipino ancestry to receive the medal for his actions in the war in Europe during World War II. Private Joe P. Martinez was the first Hispanic-American recipient to be awarded the Medal of Honor posthumously for combat heroism on American soil during the same conflict. 1st Lt. Baldomero Lopez, is the only Hispanic graduate of the United States Naval Academy to receive the Medal of Honor. Captain Humbert Roque Versace was the first recipient of the Medal of Honor to be given to an Army POW for his actions during captivity in Southeast Asia during the Vietnam War.

== Terminology ==
Hispanic is an ethnic term employed to categorize any citizen or resident of the United States, of any racial background, of any country, and of any religion, who has at least one ancestor from the people of Spain or is of non-Hispanic origin, but has an ancestor from Mexico, Puerto Rico, Cuba, Central or South America, or other Hispanic origin. The three largest Hispanic groups in the United States are the Mexican-Americans, Puerto Ricans, and Cubans.

== American Civil War ==
Three Hispanic Americans earned the Medal of Honor during the American Civil War, two were sailors of the Union Navy and one was a soldier of the 19th Massachusetts Infantry.

This with the * indicates that the Medal of Honor was awarded posthumously

Image	Name	Rank	Branch	Unit	Place of action	Date of action	Notes/Reference
—	Philip Bazaar	Ordinary Seaman	Navy	Massachusetts, USS Santiago de Cuba	Assault on Fort Fisher	January 15, 1865	"As one of a boat crew detailed to one of the generals on shore, O.S. Bazaar bravely entered the fort in the assault and accompanied his party in carrying dispatches at the height of the battle. He was 1 of 6 men who entered the fort in the assault from the fleet"
—	Joseph H. De Castro	Corporal	Army	Company I, 19th Massachusetts Infantry	Gettysburg, Pennsylvania	July 3, 1863	Attacked a confederate flag bearer from the 19th Virginia Infantry regiment and captured their flag.
—	John Ortega	Seaman	Navy	USS Saratoga	USS Saratoga	December 1864	Was a member of a landing party who made several raids in August and September 1864 which resulted in the capture of many confederate prisoners and the taking or destruction of substantial quantities of ordnance, ammunition, and supplies. A number of buildings, bridges, and salt works were also destroyed during the expedition

== Boxer Rebellion ==
During the Boxer Rebellion only one Hispanic American received the Medal of Honor and that was France Silva who earned it for "distinguishing himself for meritorious conduct".

This with the * indicates that the Medal of Honor was awarded posthumously

Image	Name	Rank	Branch	Unit	Place of action	Date of action	Notes/Reference
—	France Silva	Private	Marine Corps	USS Newark	Peking, China	June 28, 1900–August 17, 1900	For distinguishing himself by meritorious conduct

== World War I ==
Image	Name	Rank	Branch	Unit	Place of action	Date of action	Notes/Reference
A head and shoulders portrait of a young, cleanshaven man in a formal military uniform, wearing a hat.	David B. Barkley*	Private	Army	Company A, 356th Infantry, 89th Division	Near Pouilly, France	November 9, 1918	Volunteered to swim a river to gather information on an enemy force. When he was swimming back across the river he got cramps and drowned.

== World War II ==
This with the * indicates that the Medal of Honor was awarded posthumously

Image	Name	Rank	Branch	Unit	Place of action	Date of action	Notes/Reference
	Lucian Adams	Staff sergeant	Army	30th Infantry, 3d Infantry Division	St. Die, France	October 1944	
	Pedro Cano	Private	Army	Company C, 8th Infantry Regiment, 4th Infantry Division	Schevenhutte, Germany	Dec. 3, 1944	
	Rudolph B. Davila	Staff sergeant	Army	Company H, 7th Infantry	Artena, Italy	May 28, 1944	Risked his life to destroy three hostile machine guns.
	Joe Gandara*	Private	Army	Company D, 2d Battalion, 507th Parachute Infantry Regiment, 82d Airborne Division	Amfreville, France	June 9, 1944	He destroyed three hostile machine guns before he was fatally wounded.
	Marcario Garcia	Staff sergeant	Army	Company B, 22d Infantry, 4th Infantry Division	Near Grosshau, Germany	November 27, 1944	"While an acting squad leader, he single-handedly assaulted two enemy machine gun emplacements"
	Harold Gonsalves*	Private first class	Marine Corps	4th Battalion, 15th Marines; 6th Marine Division	Ryūkyū Chain, Okinawa	April 15, 1945	Sacrificed his life to smother a grenade with his body
	David M. Gonzales*	Private first class	Army	Company A, 127th Infantry, 32 Infantry Division	Villa Verde Trail, Luzon, Philippine Islands	April 25, 1945	Was killed in action in the Philippines while digging out fellow soldiers who had been buried in a bomb explosion
	Silvestre S. Herrera	Private first class	Army	Company E, 142d Infantry, 36th Infantry Division	Near Mertzwiller, France	March 15, 1945	Injured in action while charging an enemy stronghold resulting in the capture of eight enemy soldiers
	Salvador J. Lara*	Private first class	Army	602d Ordnance Armament Maintenance Battalion, 45th Infantry Division	Aprilia, Italy	May 27–28, 1944	For courageous actions during combat operations in Aprilia, Italy before he was fatally wounded.
	Jose M. Lopez	Sergeant	Army	2d Infantry Division	Near Krinkelt, Belgium	December 17, 1944	Single-handedly repulsed a German infantry attack, killing at least 100 enemy troops
	Joe P. Martinez*	Private	Army	Company K, 32d Infantry, 7th Infantry Division	Attu, Aleutians, Alaska, United States	May 26, 1943	Killed in action while participating in the defeat of enemy forces in a snow-covered mountain.
	Manuel V. Mendoza*	Staff sergeant	Army	350th Infantry Regiment, 88th Infantry Division	Battaglia, Italy	Oct. 4, 1944	For courageous actions during combat operations on Mount Battaglia, Italy before he was fatally wounded.
	Manuel Perez Jr.*	Private first class	Army	Company A 511th Parachute Infantry, 11th Airborne Division	Fort William McKinley, Luzon, Philippine Islands	February 13, 1945	Killed 18 enemy soldiers so his company could advance
	Cleto L. Rodriguez	Private	Army	Company B, 148th Infantry, 37th Division	Paco Railroad Station, Manila, Philippine Islands	February 9, 1945	With another soldier, who was killed in the action, killed more than 82 Japanese, completely disorganized their defense, and allowed for the enemy to be defeated
	Alejandro R. Ruiz	Private first class	Army	165th Infantry, 27th Infantry Division	Okinawa	April 28, 1945	Risked his life to eliminate an enemy pillbox and kill the 12 enemy soldiers who were occupying it
	Jose F. Valdez*	Private first class	Army	Company B, 7th Infantry, 3d Infantry Division	Rosenkrantz, France	January 25, 1945	
	Ysmael R. Villegas*	Staff sergeant	Army	Company F, 127th Infantry, 32d Infantry Division	Villa Verde Trail, Luzon, Philippine Islands	March 20, 1945	

== Korean War ==
This with the * indicates that the Medal of Honor was awarded posthumously

Image	Name	Rank	Branch	Unit	Place of action	Date of action	Notes/Reference
	Joe R. Baldonado*	Corporal	Army	Company B, 1st Battalion, 187th Airborne Regimental Combat Team, 11th Airborne Division.	Kangdong, North Korea	Nov. 25, 1950	
	Victor H. Espinoza*	Corporal	Army	Company A, 1st Battalion, 23d Infantry Regiment, 2d Infantry Division.	Chorwon, North Korea	Aug. 1, 1952	
A head and shoulders portrait of a young, cleanshaven man with dark hair.	Fernando Luis García*	Private first class	Marine Corps	Company I 3rd Battalion, 5th Marines; 1st Marine Division	Korea	September 5, 1952	
	Edward Gomez*	Private first class	Marine Corps	Company E 2nd Battalion, 1st Marines; 1st Marine Division	Kajon-ni, Korea	September 14, 1951	
	Eduardo C. Gomez*	Sergeant	Army	Company I, 3d Battalion, 8th Cavalry Regiment (Infantry), 1st Cavalry Division.	Tabu-dong, South Korea	Sept. 3, 1950	For heroism in inflicting a heavy toll in casualties and retarding the enemy's advance.
	Ambrosio Guillen*	Staff sergeant	Marine Corps	Company F 2nd Battalion, 7th Marines; 1st Marine Division	Songuch-on, Korea	July 25, 1953	
	Rodolfo P. Hernandez	Corporal	Army	Company G, 187th Airborne Regimental Combat Team	Near Wontong-ni, Korea	May 31, 1951	
	Baldomero Lopez*	First lieutenant	Marine Corps	Company A 1st Battalion, 5th Marines; 1st Marine Division	Inchon Landing, Korea	September 15, 1950	
	Benito Martinez*	Corporal	Army	Company A, 27th Infantry Regiment, 25th Infantry Division	Satacri, Korea	September 6, 1952	
	Juan E. Negrón*	Master sergeant	Army	65th Infantry Regiment, 3rd Infantry Division	Kalma-Eri, North Korea	April 28, 1951	For courageous actions during combat operations in Kalma-Eri, North Korea.
	Eugene Arnold Obregon*	Private first class	Marine Corps	Company G 3rd Battalion, 5th Marines; 1st Marine Division	Second Battle of Seoul	September 26, 1950	
	Mike C. Pena*	Master sergeant	Army	Company F, 2d Battalion, 5th Cavalry Regiment (Infantry), 1st Cavalry Division.	Waegwan, South Korea	Sept. 4, 1950	
	Demensio Rivera	Private	Army	Company G, 2d Battalion, 7th Infantry Regiment, 3d Infantry Division.	Changyong-ni, South Korea	May 23, 1951	For courageous actions during combat operations in Changyong-ni, South Korea.
	Joseph C. Rodriguez	Private first class	Army	Company F, 17th Infantry Regiment, 7th Infantry Division	Near Munye-ri, Korea	May 21, 1951	
	Miguel A. Vera*	Private	Army	Company F, 2d Battalion, 38th Infantry Regiment, 2d Infantry Division.	Chorwon, South Korea	Sept. 21, 1952	

== Vietnam War ==
This with the * indicates that the Medal of Honor was awarded posthumously

Image	Name	Rank	Branch	Unit	Place of action	Date of action	Notes/Reference
	Leonard L. Alvarado*	Specialist four	Army	Company D, 2d Battalion, 12th Cavalry, 1st Cavalry Division.	Phuoc Long province, South Vietnam	Aug. 12, 1969	
	Roy P. Benavidez	Master sergeant	Army	Detachment B-56, 5th Special Forces	Loc Ninh, Vietnam	May 2, 1968	
	Felix M. Conde-Falcon*	Staff sergeant	Army	Company D, 1st Battalion, 505th Infantry, 3d Brigade, 82d Airborne Division.	Ap Tan Hoa, South Vietnam	April 4, 1969	
	Emilio A. De La Garza*	Lance corporal	Marine Corps	Company E 2nd Battalion, 1st Marines	Da Nang	April 11, 1970	
	Ralph E. Dias*	Private first class	Marine Corps	1st Battalion, 7th Marines	Quang Nam Province	November 12, 1969	
	Jesus S. Duran*	Specialist four	Army	Company E, 2d Battalion, 5th Cavalry, 1st Cavalry Division (Airmobile).	South Vietnam	April 10, 1969	Mounting a log, he fired directly into the enemy's foxholes and eliminated four of them and several others as they fled.
	Santiago J. Erevia	Specialist four	Army	Company C, 1st Battalion (Airmobile), 501st Infantry Regiment, 101st Airborne Division	Tam Ky	May 1969	
	Daniel D. Fernández*	Specialist four	Army	Company C, 1st Battalion, 5th Infantry (Mechanized) 25th Infantry Division	Hau Nghia Province	February 18, 1966	
	Candelario Garcia*	Sergeant	Army	Company B, 1st Battalion, 1st Brigade, 1st Infantry Division	Lai Khe, South Vietnam	Dec. 8, 1968	
	Alfredo Cantu Gonzalez*	Sergeant	Marine Corps	Company A 1st Battalion, 1st Marines	Hue City	February 4, 1968	
	Jose Francisco Jimenez*	Lance corporal	Marine Corps	Company K 3rd Battalion, 7th Marines; 1st Marine Division	Quang Nam Province	August 28, 1969	
	Miguel Keith*	Lance corporal	Marine Corps	III Marine Amphibious Force	Quang Ngai Province	May 8, 1970	
	Carlos Lozada*	Private first class	Army	Company A, 2nd Battalion, 502d Infantry, 173d Airborne Brigade	Dak To	November 20, 1967	
	Alfred V. Rascon	Specialist four	Army	Reconnaissance Platoon, Headquarters Company, 1st Battalion (Airborne), 503rd Infantry,173d Airborne Brigade	Republic of Vietnam	March 16, 1966	
	Louis R. Rocco	Sergeant first class	Army	Advisory Team 162, United States Military Assistance Command	Northeast of Katum, Republic of Vietnam	May 24, 1970	
	Jose Rodela	Sergeant first class	Army	Detachment B-36, Company A, 5th Special Forces Group (Airborne), 1st Special Forces.	Phuoc Long Province, South Vietnam	September 1, 1969	For actions during combat operations against an armed enemy .
	Euripides Rubio*	Captain	Army	Headquarters and Headquarters Company, 1st Battalion, 28th Infantry, 1st Infantry Division	Tay Ninh Province	November 8, 1966	
	Hector Santiago-Colon*	Specialist four	Army	Company B, 5th Battalion, 7th Cavalry, 1st Cavalry Division (airmobile)	Quang Tri Province	June 28, 1968	
	Elmelindo Rodrigues Smith*	Sergeant first class	Army	Company C, 2d Battalion, 8th Infantry, 4th Infantry Division	Republic of Vietnam	February 16, 1967	
	Jay R. Vargas	Captain	Marine Corps	Company G 2nd Battalion, 4th Marines; 9th Marine Amphibious Brigade	Dai Do	April 30, 1968–May 2, 1968	
	Humbert Roque Versace*	Captain	Army	Detachment A-23, 5th Special Forces Group	An Xuyen Province	October 29, 1963–September 26, 1965	
	Maximo Yabes*	First sergeant	Army	Company A, 4th Battalion, 9th Infantry, 25th Infantry Division	Near Phu Hoa Dong	February 26, 1967	

== War in Afghanistan ==
Image	Name	Rank	Branch	Unit	Place of action	Date of action	Notes/Reference
	Leroy Petry	Sergeant first class	Army	D Company, 2nd Battalion, 75th Ranger Regiment	Afghanistan	May 26, 2008	

== By military branch ==
Awards by branch of service
Military branch	Posthumously	In person	Number of awards
Army	30	16	46
Marines	11	2	13
Navy	0	2	2
Total	41	20	61

Note: The information in "Awards by branch of service Table" is based on the sourced information on the "List of Recipients Table".

== See also ==
- List of Medal of Honor recipients
- Puerto Rican recipients of the Medal of Honor
- Hispanic Americans in World War II
- Hispanics in the United States Marine Corps
- Hispanics in the United States Navy
- Hispanics in the United States Coast Guard
- Hispanics in the American Civil War
- List of Portuguese-American Medal of Honor recipients
