= Carlos Lozada =

Carlos Lozada may refer to:

- Carlos Lozada (journalist) (born 1971), Peruvian-American journalist
- Carlos Lozada (soldier) (1946–1967), member of the United States Army
