= Miguel Vera =

United States Army Medal of Honor recipient

Miguel Armando Rodriguez-Vera
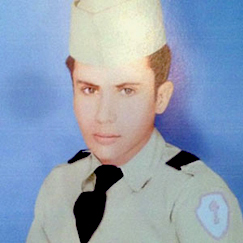
- Born: Miguel Armando Rodriguez-Vera; May 3, 1932; Adjuntas, Puerto Rico
- Died: September 21, 1952 (aged 20); Chorwon, North Korea
- Burial place: Arlington National Cemetery
- Military career
- Allegiance: United States of America
- Branch: United States Army
- Rank: Private
- Nickname: "Nando"
- Service number: US50110351
- Units: Company F, 38th Infantry Regiment, 2nd Infantry Division
- Conflicts: Korean War: Battle of Old Baldy †
- Awards: Medal of Honor; Purple Heart

Miguel Armando "Nando" Rodriguez-Vera (May 3, 1932 – September 21, 1952) was a United States Army soldier who was killed in the Korean War and a posthumous recipient of the Medal of Honor for his actions during the Battle of Old Baldy.

== Biographical details ==
Rodriguez-Vera was born in Adjuntas, Puerto Rico to Carmen Vera Cardona, and joined the U.S. Army when he was 17 years old.

After Rodriguez-Vera was killed in action in the Korean War, his body was transferred to Puerto Rico where he was buried with full military honors in the Utuado Municipal Cemetery, Utuado, Puerto Rico. Years later, in November 2014, Rodriguez-Vera was reburied at Arlington National Cemetery in Arlington, Virginia.

In 2017, Miguel Rodriguez Vera, was posthumously inducted to the Puerto Rico Veterans Hall of Fame.

== Medal of Honor ==
Vera's nephew Joe Rodriguez accepted the Medal of Honor on his late uncle's behalf.

The bestowal of the Medal of Honor recognized Rodriguez-Vera for his actions at Chorwon, North Korea, on September 21, 1952. While Rodriguez-Vera's unit attempted to retake the right sector of Old Baldy, it came under heavy fire at close range and was forced back. Rodriguez-Vera selflessly chose to stay and cover the troops' withdrawal, and lost his life during this action.

Rodriguez-Vera was posthumously bestowed the Medal of Honor by President Obama in a March 18, 2014 White House ceremony.

The bestowal of the Medal of Honor was in accordance with the National Defense Authorization Act which called for a review of Jewish American and Hispanic American veterans from World War II, the Korean War and the Vietnam War to ensure that no prejudice was shown to those deserving the Medal of Honor.

=== Medal of Honor citation ===

The President of the United States of America, under the provisions of the Act of Congress approved, July 9, 1918 (amended by act of July 25, 1963), takes pride in presenting the Medal of Honor (Posthumously) to:

PRIVATE
MIGUEL A. VERA
UNITED STATES ARMY

For conspicuous gallantry and intrepidity at the risk of his life above and beyond the call of duty:

Private Miguel A. Rodriguez-Vera distinguished himself by acts of gallantry and intrepidity above and beyond the call of duty while serving as an automatic rifleman with Company F, 38th Infantry Regiment, 2nd Infantry Division in Chorwon, Korea, on September 21, 1952.

That morning, despite suffering from wounds inflicted in a previous battle, Private Rodriguez-Vera voluntarily left the aid station to join his comrades in an attack against well-fortified enemy positions on a hill of great importance. When the assaulting elements had moved within twenty yards of the enemy positions, they were suddenly trapped by a heavy volume of mortar, artillery and small-arms fire. The company prepared to make a limited withdrawal, but Private Rodriguez-Vera volunteered to remain behind to provide covering fire. As his companions moved to safety, Private Rodriguez-Vera remained steadfast in his position, directing accurate fire against the hostile positions despite the intense volume of fire which the enemy was concentrating upon him. Later in the morning, when the friendly force returned, they discovered Private Rodriguez-Vera in the same position, facing the enemy. Private Rodriguez-Vera's noble intrepidity and self-sacrifice saved many of his comrades' lives.

Private Rodriguez-Vera's extraordinary heroism and selflessness at the cost of his own life, above and beyond the call of duty, are in keeping with the highest traditions of the military service and reflect great credit upon himself, his unit and the United States Army.

== Awards and decorations ==

Badge	Combat Infantryman Badge		
1st row	Medal of Honor		
2nd row	Army Good Conduct Medal	Army Good Conduct Medal	National Defense Service Medal
3rd row	United Nations Korea Medal	United Nations Service Medal Korea	Korean War Service Medal (with one silver star)
Republic of Korea Presidential Unit Citation
Hwarang Distinguished Military Service Medal (with one silver star)

=== Badges ===
- 2 Overseas Service Bar
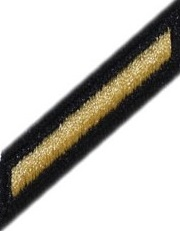
- 1 Service stripe

== See also ==
- List of Puerto Ricans
- List of Puerto Rican military personnel
- List of Korean War Medal of Honor recipients
- List of Puerto Rican recipients of the Medal of Honor
- List of Hispanic Medal of Honor recipients
