= Jose Rodela =

United States Army Medal of Honor recipient

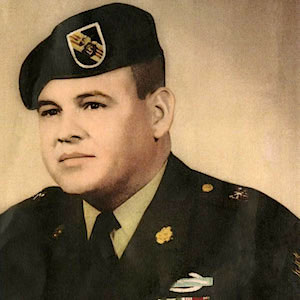
- Rodela during his time of service
- Born: June 15, 1937 (age 89); Corpus Christi, Texas
- Military career
- Allegiance: United States
- Branch: United States Army
- Service years: 1955–1975
- Rank: Master Sergeant
- Units: Detachment B-36, Company A, 5th Special Forces Group (Airborne)
- Conflicts: Vietnam War
- Awards: Medal of Honor; Bronze Star Medal; Purple Heart (2); Air Medal; Army Commendation Medal (2)

Jose Rodela (born June 15, 1937) is a United States Army veteran of the Vietnam War and a recipient of the Medal of Honor.

== Military career ==
Rodela, a Mexican-American, joined the United States Army in 1955 at age 17, and retired with the rank of master sergeant in 1975.

Rodela was awarded the Medal of Honor by President Barack Obama in a March 18, 2014 ceremony in the White House. The award comes through the Defense Authorization Act which called for a review of Jewish American, African American and Hispanic American veterans from World War II, the Korean War and the Vietnam War to ensure that no prejudice was shown to those deserving the Medal of Honor.

The Medal of Honor recognized Rodela's valorous actions on September 1, 1969, while serving as a company commander in Phước Long Province, South Vietnam. Rodela commanded his company throughout 18 hours of continuous contact when his battalion was attacked and taking heavy casualties. Throughout the battle, in spite of his wounds, Rodela repeatedly exposed himself to enemy fire to attend to the fallen and eliminate an enemy rocket position.

== Medal of Honor citation ==
Rodela receives the Medal of Honor at a White House ceremony on March 18, 2014.

For conspicuous gallantry and intrepidity at the risk of his life above and beyond the call of duty:

Sergeant First Class Jose Rodela distinguished himself by acts of gallantry and intrepidity above and beyond the call of duty while serving as the company commander, Detachment B-36, Company A, 5th Special Forces Group (Airborne), 1st Special Forces during combat operations against an armed enemy in Phuoc Long Province, Republic of Vietnam on September 1, 1969. That afternoon, Sergeant First Class Rodela's battalion came under an intense barrage of mortar, rocket, and machine gun fire. Ignoring the withering enemy fire, Sergeant First Class Rodela immediately began placing his men into defensive positions to prevent the enemy from overrunning the entire battalion. Repeatedly exposing himself to enemy fire, Sergeant First Class Rodela moved from position to position, providing suppressing fire and assisting wounded, and was himself wounded in the back and head by a B-40 rocket while recovering a wounded comrade. Alone, Sergeant First Class Rodela assaulted and knocked out the B-40 rocket position before successfully returning to the battalion's perimeter. Sergeant First Class Rodela's extraordinary heroism and selflessness above and beyond the call of duty are in keeping with the highest traditions of military service and reflect great credit upon himself, his unit and the United States Army.

== Other awards ==
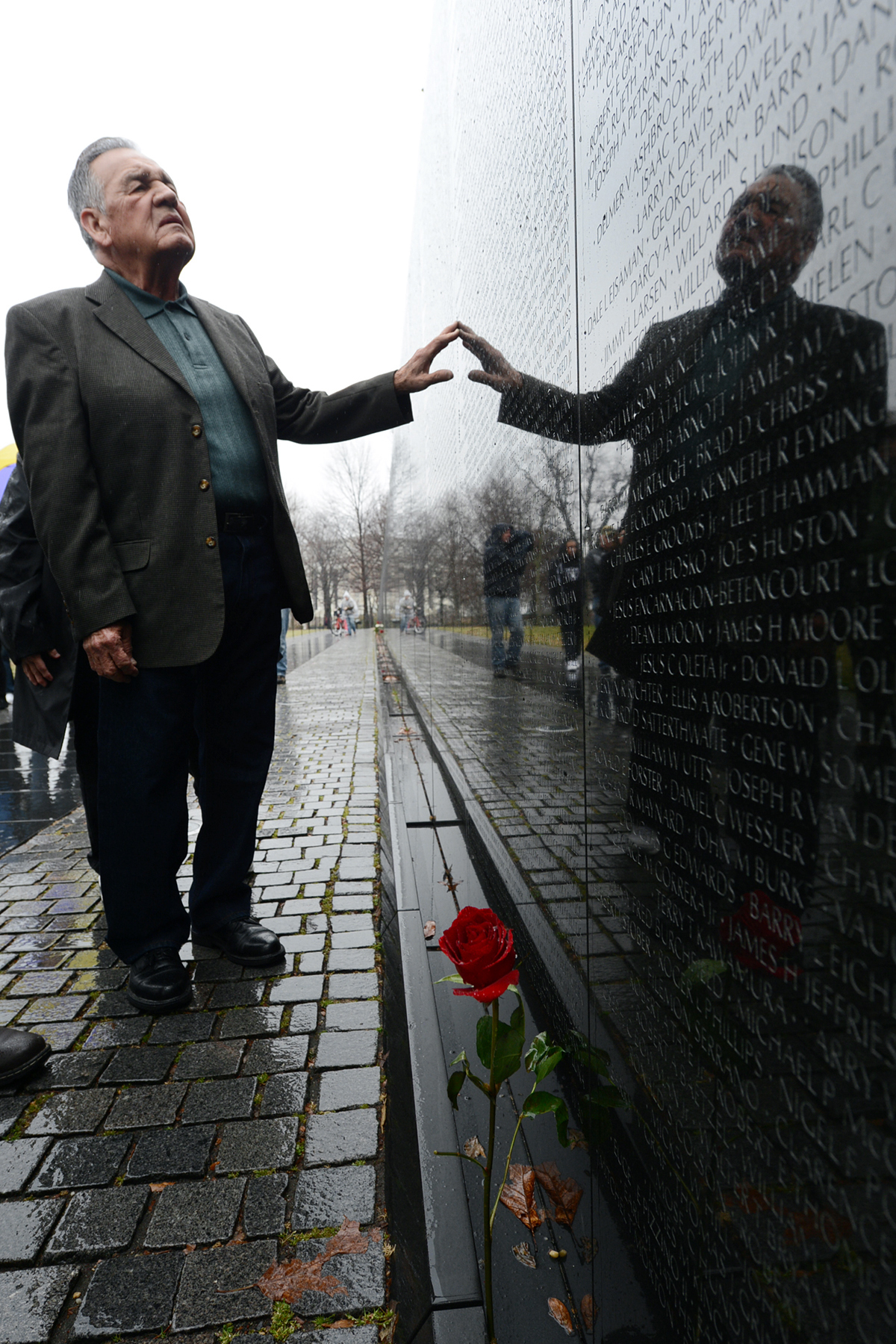
Rodela at the Vietnam Veterans Memorial in 2014

In addition to the Medal of Honor, Rodela received the following awards:

- Bronze Star Medal
- Purple Heart with one Bronze Oak Leaf Cluster
- Air Medal with "V" Device
- Army Commendation Medal with one Bronze Oak Leaf Cluster
- Presidential Unit Citation
- Meritorious Unit Commendation with one Bronze Oak Leaf Cluster
- Army Good Conduct Medal with Silver Clasp and two Loops
- National Defense Service Medal
- Vietnam Service Medal with four Bronze Service Stars
- Republic of Vietnam Gallantry Cross with Palm Device
- Republic of Vietnam Civil Actions Medal Unit Citation
- Republic of Vietnam Campaign Medal
- Combat Infantryman Badge
- Master Parachutist Badge
- Expert Marksmanship Badge with Rifle Bar
- Special Forces Tab
- Republic of Vietnam Special Forces Honorary Jump Wings
- Colombian Army Parachutist Badge
- Army Special Forces CSIB and DUI
- 5 Overseas Service Bars
- 7 Service stripes

== See also ==
- List of Medal of Honor recipients for the Vietnam War
- List of Hispanic Medal of Honor recipients
