= Demensio Rivera =

Puerto Rican U.S. Medal of Honor recipient

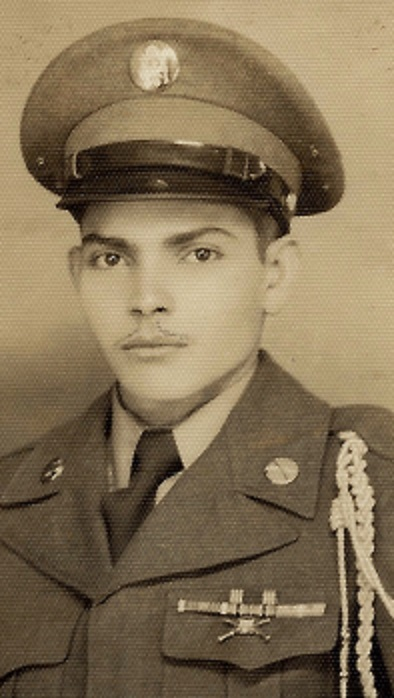
- Born: April 28, 1932; Cabo Rojo, Puerto Rico
- Died: March 19, 1967 (aged 34); New York City, NY
- Burial place: San Miguel Arcangel Cemetery, Cabo Rojo, Puerto Rico
- Military career
- Allegiance: United States of America
- Branch: United States Army
- Service years: 1950–1951
- Rank: Private First Class
- Units: 7th Infantry Regiment, 3rd Infantry Division
- Conflicts: Korean War
- Awards: Medal of Honor; Purple Heart

Private Demensio Rivera (April 28, 1932 – March 19, 1967) was a United States Army veteran of the Korean War who was awarded the Distinguished Service Cross; the award was upgraded in 2014, decades after his death, to the Medal of Honor.

== Biography ==
Demensio Rivera y Avilés was the youngest of five children born in Cabo Rojo, Puerto Rico to Demensio Rivera Y Negrón and Dolores Avilés De Rivera. He was still a child when his parents moved to New York City, where he was raised.

On September 26, 1950, Rivera joined the United States Army in New York. In 1951, he was deployed to the Republic of Korea as a member of Company G, 2nd Battalion, 7th Infantry Regiment, 3rd Infantry Division. When his unit was attacked by the enemy during the UN May–June 1951 counteroffensive, he delivered continuous and devastating fire at them with his automatic rifle until his weapon became inoperative. He employed his pistol and grenades and stopped the enemy within a few feet of his position. Rivera was seriously wounded and was awarded the Distinguished Service Cross, the Army's second highest military decoration. His DSC was upgraded to the Medal of Honor and was posthumously awarded to him in 2014.

Rivera was residing in New York City where he died on March 19, 1967. His body was transferred to Puerto Rico. He was buried with full military honors in section C row K -184 at the Cementerio San Miguel Arcangel located in Carretera PR-308, Parcelas Puerto Real, Cabo Rojo.

== Medal of Honor ==
The bestowal of the Medal of Honor recognized Rivera for his actions at Changyong-ni, Korea, May 22–23, 1951. When the outpost area occupied by his platoon was assaulted during the night, Rivera, an automatic rifleman, held his forward position tenaciously, although exposed to very heavy fire. When his rifle became inoperative, Rivera employed his pistol and grenades, and eventually fought the enemy hand-to-hand and forced them back.

Rivera was posthumously awarded the Medal of Honor by President Barack Obama in a March 18, 2014 White House ceremony. Rivera was one of four Puerto Ricans to be honored that day and one of nine Puerto Ricans to have received the Medal of Honor.

Rivera's granddaughter, U.S. Army Sgt. Ashley Randall, received the Medal of Honor on her late grandfather's behalf, from President Obama in 2014.

The award came through the Defense Authorization Act which called for a review of Jewish American and Hispanic American veterans from World War II, the Korean War and the Vietnam War to ensure that no prejudice was shown to those deserving the Medal of Honor.

== Medal of Honor citation ==

The President of the United States of America, authorized by Act of Congress, July 9, 1918 (amended by act of July 25, 1963), takes pride in presenting the Medal of Honor (posthumously) to:

DEMENSIO RIVERA
United States Army

For conspicuous gallantry and intrepidity at the risk of his life above and beyond the call of duty:

Private Demensio Rivera distinguished himself by acts of gallantry and intrepidity above and beyond the call of duty while serving as an automatic rifleman with 2d Platoon, Company G, 7th Infantry Regiment, 3rd Infantry Division during combat operations against an armed enemy in Changyong-ni, Korea on May 23, 1951.

Early that morning, a large hostile force emerged from a dense fog and viciously attacked Private Rivera and his comrades. Private Rivera immediately responded by firing with deadly accuracy until his weapon jammed. Without hesitating, he threw his rifle down and began to engage the enemy with his pistol and grenades. At one point, Private Rivera fearlessly crawled from his emplacement to engage an infiltrating enemy soldier in fierce hand-to-hand combat. With only the sound of footsteps and obscure shadows to guide his aim, Private Rivera held his position against tremendous odds, inflicting numerous casualties on the enemy until he found himself without ammunition of any kind except one grenade. Displaying a peerless fighting spirit and an utterly selfless devotion to duty, Private Rivera pulled the pin from his last grenade and calmly waited for the enemy to reach his position. As enemy troops leaped inside his bunker, Private Rivera activated the grenade with the full knowledge that it meant his almost certain death. When the debris from the explosion had cleared, friendly forces recovered a severely wounded Private Rivera and discovered the bodies of four dead or dying enemy soldiers surrounding him.

Private Rivera's extraordinary heroism and selflessness above and beyond the call of duty are in keeping with the highest traditions of military service and reflect great credit upon himself, his unit and the United States Army.

== Honors, awards and decorations ==
Among Private Rivera's military decorations are the following:

Badge	Combat Infantryman Badge		
1st row	Medal of Honor Upgraded from DSC, 2014		
2nd row	Purple Heart	Army Good Conduct Medal	National Defense Service Medal
3rd row	Korean Service Medal with 1 Campaign star	United Nations Service Medal Korea	Korean War Service Medal Retroactively Awarded, 2003
Unit Awards	Korean Presidential Unit Citation		

3rd Infantry Division Insignia

== Honors ==
- In 2017 Demensio Rivera was posthumously inducted to the Puerto Rico Veterans Hall of Fame.
- In 2022 Demensio Rivera was posthumously inducted to the 3rd Infantry Division Marne Hall of Fame.

== See also ==
- List of Korean War Medal of Honor recipients
- List of Puerto Ricans
- List of Puerto Rican military personnel
- List of Puerto Rican recipients of the Medal of Honor
- List of Hispanic Medal of Honor recipients
