= List of Puerto Rican recipients of the Medal of Honor =

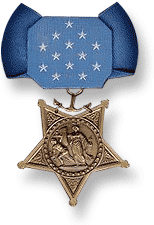
Navy and Marine MoH

Army MoH

Since World War I Puerto Ricans and people of Puerto Rican descent have participated in every conflict in which the United States has been involved as members of the United States Armed Forces. The following nine Puerto Ricans, including those of Puerto Rican descent, (Note: The Distinguished Service Cross Medal's of Juan E. Negron, Demensio Rivera, Miguel Vera and Félix Conde Falcón were upgraded to the Medal of Honor on March 18, 2014.) have made the ultimate sacrifice and were posthumously awarded the nation's highest military decoration – the Medal of Honor. The Medal of Honor is bestowed "for conspicuous gallantry and intrepidity at the risk of life, above and beyond the call of duty, in actual combat against an armed enemy force." The medal is awarded by the President of the United States on behalf of the Congress.

PFC Fernando Luis García was the first Puerto Rican and the only one who was a member of the United States Marine Corps to have been awarded the Medal of Honor for his actions during the Korean War. The other eight were members of the United States Army and were awarded the medal for their actions during the Korean War or the Vietnam War.

On March 18, 2014, President Barack Obama posthumously awarded the Medal of Honor to Félix Conde Falcón, Juan Negrón, Demensio Rivera and Miguel Vera. The total of Puerto Rican soldiers awarded the Medal of Honor increased to a total of nine.

== Medal of Honor ==
The Medal of Honor was created during the American Civil War and is the highest military decoration presented by the United States government to a member of its armed forces. The recipient must have distinguished themselves at the risk of their own life above and beyond the call of duty in action against an enemy of the United States. Due to the nature of this medal, it is commonly presented posthumously.

== Korean War ==
=== Fernando Luis García ===
PFC Fernando Luis García* (October 14, 1929 – September 5, 1952), born in Utuado, Puerto Rico, was a member of the United States Marines and the first Puerto Rican who was awarded the Medal of Honor.

Medal of Honor citation:

PRIVATE FIRST CLASS FERNANDO L. GARCIA
Rank and organization:Private First Class, U.S. Marine Corps, Company I, 3d Battalion, 5th Marines, 1st Marine Division (Rein.).
Place and date: Korea, 5 September 1952.
Entered service at:San Juan, P.R.
Born:14 October 1929, Utuado, Puerto Rico
Citation:

For conspicuous gallantry and intrepidity at the risk of his life above and beyond the call of duty while serving as a member of Company I, Third Battalion, Fifth Marines, First Marine Division (Reinforced), in action against enemy aggressor forces in Korea on September 5, 1952. While participating in the defense of a combat outpost located more than one mile forward of the main line of resistance during a savage night attack by a fanatical enemy force employing grenades, mortars and artillery, Private First Class Garcia, although suffering painful wounds, moved through the intense hail of hostile fire to a supply point to secure more hand grenades. Quick to act when a hostile grenade landed nearby, endangering the life of another Marine, as well as his own, he unhesitatingly chose to sacrifice himself and immediately threw his body upon the deadly missile, receiving the full impact of the explosion. His great personal valor and cool decision in the face of almost certain death sustain and enhance the finest traditions of the United States Naval Service. He gallantly gave his life for his country.

In memory:

PFC Fernando Luis Garcia's remains were never recovered. There is a headstone with Garcia's name in the Puerto Rico National Cemetery in the city of Bayamon, Puerto Rico.

=== Juan E. Negrón ===
Master Sergeant Juan E. Negron*, (September 26, 1929 – March 29, 1996) born in Corozal, Puerto Rico, was posthumously awarded the Medal of Honor on March 18, 2014, for his courageous actions while serving as a member of Company L, 65th Infantry Regiment, 3rd Infantry Division during combat operations against an armed enemy in Kalma-Eri, Korea on April 28, 1951.

Medal of Honor citation:

MASTER SERGEANT
JUAN E. NEGRON
UNITED STATES ARMY

For service as set forth in the following citation:

The Distinguished Service Cross is presented to Juan E. Negron (RA10406243), Master Sergeant, U.S. Army, for extraordinary heroism in connection with military operations against an armed enemy of the United Nations while serving with the 65th Infantry Regiment, 3d Infantry Division. Master Sergeant Negron distinguished himself by extraordinary heroism in action against enemy aggressor forces in the vicinity of Kalma-Eri, Korea, on 28 April 1951. On that date, Sergeant Negron took up the most vulnerable position on his company's exposed right flank after an enemy force had overrun a section of the line. When notified that elements of the company were withdrawing, Sergeant Negron refused to leave his exposed position, but delivered withering fire at hostile troops who had broken through a road block. When the hostile troops approached his position, Sergeant Negron accurately hurled hand grenades at short range, halting their attack. Sergeant Negron held the position throughout the night, while an allied counter attack was organized and launched. After the enemy had been repulsed, fifteen enemy dead were found only a few feet from Sergeant Negron's position. The extraordinary heroism exhibited by Sergeant Negron on this occasion reflects great credit on himself and is in keeping with the finest traditions of the military service.

In memory:

On March 29, 1996, Negrón died in Bayamon, Puerto Rico. He was buried with military honors in Plot: J 0 3180 of the Puerto Rico National Cemetery located in the city of Bayamon.

=== Demensio Rivera ===
Private Demensio Rivera*, (April 28, 1932 – March 19, 1964) born in Cabo Rojo, Puerto Rico, was posthumously awarded the Medal of Honor on March 18, 2014, for his courageous actions while serving as an automatic rifleman with 2d Platoon, Company G, 7th Infantry Regiment, 3d Infantry Division during combat operations against an armed enemy in Changyong-ni, Korea on May 23, 1951.

Medal of Honor citation:

PRIVATE FIRST CLASS
DEMENSIO RIVERA
UNITED STATES ARMY

For service as set forth in the following citation:

The Distinguished Service Cross is presented to Demensio Rivera (RA12346464), Private First Class, U.S. Army, for extraordinary heroism in connection with military operations against an armed enemy of the United Nations while serving with Company G, 2d Battalion, 7th Infantry Regiment, 3d Infantry Division. Private First Class Rivera distinguished himself by extraordinary heroism in action against enemy aggressor forces at Changyong-ni, Korea, on 22 and 23 May 1951. When the outpost area occupied by his platoon was assaulted during the night, Private Rivera, an automatic rifleman, held his forward position tenaciously, although exposed to very heavy fire. With his automatic rifle, he delivered a continuous and devastating fire at the approaching enemy until this weapon became inoperative, whereupon he employed his pistol and grenades and stopped the enemy within a few feet of his position. During a renewed attack, he fought the enemy hand-to-hand and forced them back. Finally, as an overwhelming number of the enemy closed in on him, he killed four of them with his only remaining grenade, although they were in such close proximity he was severely wounded by the same explosion, When is position was retaken, he was recovered, seriously wounded, and lying with the bodies of the four enemy dead or dying. Private Rivera's fearless performance was a major factor in successfully repulsing the enemy's attacks. His unflinching courage and devotion to duty uphold the finest traditions of the military service.

In memory: Rivera was residing in New York City where he died on March 19, 1967. His body was transferred to Puerto Rico. He was buried with full military honors in section C row K-184 at the Cementerio San Miguel Arcangel located in Carretera PR-308, Parcelas Puerto Real, Cabo Rojo.

=== Miguel Armando Vera ===
Private Miguel Armando Vera* (May 3, 1932 – September 21, 1952) born in Adjuntas, Puerto Rico was posthumously awarded the Medal of Honor on March 18, 2014, for his courageous actions while serving as an automatic rifleman with Company F, 38th Infantry Regiment, 2nd Infantry Division in Chorwon, Korea, on September 21, 1952.

Medal of Honor citation:

PRIVATE
MIGUEL A. VERA
UNITED STATES ARMY

For service as set forth in the following citation:

For extraordinary heroism in connection with military operations against an armed enemy of the United Nations, while serving with Company F, 2nd Battalion, 38th Infantry Regiment, 2nd Infantry Division. Vera distinguished himself by extraordinary heroism in action against enemy aggressor forces at Chorwon, Korea, on Sept. 21, 1952.

On that date, Vera's unit was committed to assault and secure the right sector of "Old Baldy" and, although wounded in an earlier engagement, he voluntarily rejoined elements of the platoon regrouping at the base of the hill to resume the attack. Forging up the bare, rocky slope in skirmisher formation, the troops came within twenty yards of hostile positions when they were subjected to heavy artillery and mortar barrages and intense cross-fire from automatic weapons and grenades, which forced them to move back. He selflessly remained behind to cover the withdrawal and, maintaining a determined stand, poured crippling fire into enemy emplacements. During this action he lost his life.

In memory:

Vera's body was transferred to Puerto Rico where he was buried with full military honors in the Utuado Municipal Cemetery, Utuado, Puerto Rico. On November 20, 2014, the remains of Korean War hero, Pvt. Vera, were moved and laid to rest at Arlington National Cemetery. The military burial ceremony took place eight months after he was upgraded to the Medal of Honor more than 60 years after he was killed in action.

== Vietnam War ==
=== Carlos James Lozada ===
PFC Carlos James Lozada* (September 6, 1946 – November 20, 1967), born in Caguas, Puerto Rico, was a member of Company A, 2nd Battalion, 503d Infantry of the 173d Airborne Brigade, United States Army who was killed in action in Vietnam and was posthumously awarded the Medal of Honor.

Medal of Honor citation:

LOZADA, CARLOS JAMES
Rank and organization:Private First Class, U.S. Army, Company A, 2d Battalion, 503d Infantry, 173d Airborne Brigade
Place and date:Dak To, Republic of Vietnam, 20 November 1967.
Entered service at: New York, N.Y.
Born:6 September 1946, Caguas, Puerto Rico.
Citation:

For conspicuous gallantry and intrepidity in action at the risk of his life above and beyond the call of duty. Pfc. Lozada, U.S. Army, distinguished himself at the risk of his life above and beyond the call of duty in the battle of Dak To. While serving as a machine gunner with 1st platoon, Company A, Pfc. Lozada was part of a 4-man early warning outpost, located 35 meters from his company's lines. At 1400 hours a North Vietnamese Army company rapidly approached the outpost along a well defined trail. Pfc. Lozada alerted his comrades and commenced firing at the enemy who were within 10 meters of the outpost. His heavy and accurate machine-gun fire killed at least 20 North Vietnamese soldiers and completely disrupted their initial attack. Pfc. Lozada remained in an exposed position and continued to pour deadly fire upon the enemy despite the urgent pleas of his comrades to withdraw. The enemy continued their assault, attempting to envelop the outpost. At the same time enemy forces launched a heavy attack on the forward west flank of Company A with the intent to cut them off from their battalion. Company A was given the order to withdraw. Pfc. Lozada apparently realized that if he abandoned his position there would be nothing to hold back the surging North Vietnamese soldiers and that the entire company withdrawal would be jeopardized. He called for his comrades to move back and that he would stay and provide cover for them. He made this decision realizing that the enemy was converging on 3 sides of his position and only meters away, and a delay in withdrawal meant almost certain death. Pfc. Lozada continued to deliver a heavy, accurate volume of suppressive fire against the enemy until he was mortally wounded and had to be carried during the withdrawal. His heroic deed served as an example and an inspiration to his comrades throughout the ensuing 4-day battle. Pfc. Lozada's actions are in the highest traditions of the U.S. Army and reflect great credit upon himself, his unit, and the U.S. Army.

In memory:

PFC Lozada was buried with full military honors in Long Island National Cemetery located in Farmingdale, New York. His name is located in the Vietnam Veterans Memorial Wall Panel 30E-Row 045. His name is also inscribed in "El Monumento de la Recordación" (Monument of Remembrance), dedicated to Puerto Rico's fallen soldiers and situated in front of the Capitol Building in San Juan, Puerto Rico. The Bronx honored him by naming a playground in his honor located behind 175 Willis Ave.

=== Félix Conde Falcón ===
Staff Sergeant Felix M. Conde-Falcon* (February 28, 1938 – April 4, 1969) born in Juncos, Puerto Rico was posthumously awarded the Medal of Honor on March 18, 2014, for his courageous actions while serving as an acting Platoon Leader in Company D, 1st Battalion, 505th Infantry Regiment, 3d Brigade, 82d Airborne Division during combat operations against an armed enemy in Ap Tan Hoa, Republic of Vietnam on April 4, 1969.

Medal of Honor citation:

STAFF SERGEANT
FELIX M. CONDE-FALCON
UNITED STATES ARMY

For extraordinary heroism in connection with military operations involving conflict with an armed hostile force in the Republic of Vietnam, while serving with Company D, 1st Battalion, 505th Infantry, 3rd Brigade, 82nd Airborne Division:

Conde-Falcon distinguished himself by exceptionally valorous actions, April 4, 1969, while serving as platoon leader during a sweep operation in the vicinity of Ap Tan Hoa, Vietnam. Entering a heavily wooded section on the route of advance, the company encountered an extensive enemy bunker complex, later identified as a battalion command post. Following tactical artillery and air strikes on the heavily secured communist position, the platoon of Conde-Falcon was selected to assault and clear the bunker fortifications. Moving out ahead of his platoon, he charged the first bunker, heaving grenades as he went. As the hostile fire increased, he crawled to the blind side of an entrenchment position, jumped to the roof, and tossed a lethal grenade into the bunker aperture. Without hesitating, he proceeded to two additional bunkers, both of which he destroyed in the same manner as the first. Rejoined with his platoon, he advanced about one hundred meters through the trees, only to come under intense hostile fire. Selecting three men to accompany him, he maneuvered toward the enemy's flank position. Carrying a machine-gun, he single-handedly assaulted the nearest fortification, killing the enemy inside before running out of ammunition. After returning to the three men with his empty weapon and taking up an M-16 rifle, he concentrated on the next bunker. Within ten meters of his goal, he was shot by an unseen assailant and soon died of his wounds.

His great courage, his ability to act appropriately and decisively in accomplishing his mission, his dedication to the welfare of his men mark him as an outstanding leader Conde-Falcon's extraordinary heroism and devotion to duty, at the cost of his life, were in keeping with the highest traditions of the military service and reflect great credit upon himself, his unit, and the United States Army.

Postscript: His Medal of Honor was an upgrade made on March 18, 2014, to his Distinguished Service Cross Medal.

=== Eurípides Rubio ===
Capt. Eurípides Rubio* (March 1, 1938 – November 8, 1966), born in Ponce, Puerto Rico, was a United States Army captain. Rubio was a member of the U.S. Army, H&H Co., 1st Battalion, 28th Infantry, 1st Infantry Division, RVN.

Medal of Honor citation:

RUBIO, EURIPIDES
Rank and organization:Captain, U.S. Army, Headquarters and Headquarters Company, 1st Battalion, 28th Infantry,1st Infantry Division, RVN.
Place and date:Tay Ninh Province, Republic of Vietnam, 8 November 1966.
Entered service at:Fort Buchanan, Puerto Rico
Born: 1 March 1938, Ponce, Puerto Rico.
Citation:

For conspicuous gallantry and intrepidity in action at the risk of his life above and beyond the call of duty. Capt. Rubio, Infantry, was serving as communications officer, 1st Battalion, when a numerically superior enemy force launched a massive attack against the battalion defense position. Intense enemy machine-gun fire raked the area while mortar rounds and rifle grenades exploded within the perimeter. Leaving the relative safety of his post, Capt. Rubio received 2 serious wounds as he braved the withering fire to go to the area of most intense action where he distributed ammunition, re-established positions and rendered aid to the wounded. Disregarding the painful wounds, he unhesitatingly assumed command when a rifle company commander was medically evacuated. Capt. Rubio was wounded a third time as he selflessly exposed himself to the devastating enemy fire to move among his men to encourage them to fight with renewed effort. While aiding the evacuation of wounded personnel, he noted that a smoke grenade which was intended to mark the Viet Cong position for air strikes had fallen dangerously close to the friendly lines. Capt. Rubio ran to reposition the grenade but was immediately struck to his knees by enemy fire. Despite his several wounds, Capt. Rubio scooped up the grenade, ran through the deadly hail of fire to within 20 meters of the enemy position and hurled the already smoking grenade into the midst of the enemy before he fell for the final time. Using the re-positioned grenade as a marker, friendly air strikes were directed to destroy the hostile positions. Capt. Rubio's singularly heroic act turned the tide of battle, and his extraordinary leadership and valor were a magnificent inspiration to his men. His remarkable bravery and selfless concern for his men are in keeping with the highest traditions of the military service and reflect great credit on Capt. Rubio and the U.S. Army.

In memory:

The U.S. Army Reserve Center in the Puerto Nuevo sector of San Juan, PR was named after Captain Eurípides Rubio. The Department of Veterans Affairs Outpatient Clinic in Ponce, PR was also named in memory of Captain Eurípides Rubio. Capt. Eurípides Rubio's name is inscribed in "El Monumento de la Recordación" (Monument of Remembrance), dedicated to Puerto Rico's fallen soldiers and situated in front of the Capitol Building in San Juan, Puerto Rico. The name Eurípides Rubio is inscribed on the Vietnam Veterans Memorial ("The Wall") on Panel 12E, Row 044. His remains are buried in the Puerto Rico National Cemetery in the city of Bayamon, Puerto Rico – Section HSA, Site 5.

=== Héctor Santiago-Colón ===
Specialist Four Héctor Santiago-Colón* (December 20, 1942 – June 28, 1968) was born in Salinas, Puerto Rico. Santiago-Colon was a member of the U.S. Army, Company B, 5th Battalion, 7th Cavalry, 1st Cavalry Division. He was posthumously presented with the Medal of Honor, during the Vietnam War for saving the lives of his comrades.

Medal of Honor citation:

SANTIAGO-COLON, HECTOR
Rank and organization:Specialist Fourth Class, U.S. Army, Company B, 5th Battalion, 7th Cavalry, 1st Cavalry Division (Airmobile)
Place and date: Quang Tri Province, Republic of Vietnam, 28 June 1968
Entered service at:New York, N.Y
Born:20 December 1942, Salinas, Puerto Rico.
Citation:

For conspicuous gallantry and intrepidity in action at the risk of his life above and beyond the call of duty. Realizing that there was no time to throw the grenade out of his position, he retrieved the grenade, tucked it in to his stomach and, turning away from his comrades, absorbed the full impact of the blast. Sp4c. Santiago-Colón distinguished himself at the cost of his life while serving as a gunner in the mortar platoon of Company B. While serving as a perimeter sentry, Sp4c. Santiago-Colón heard distinct movement in the heavily wooded area to his front and flanks. He alerted his fellow sentries in the area to move to their foxholes and remain alert for any enemy probing forces. From the wooded area around his position heavy enemy automatic weapons and small arms fire suddenly broke out, but extreme darkness rendered difficult the precise location and identification of the hostile force. Only the muzzle flashes from enemy weapons indicated their position. Sp4c. Santiago-Colón and the other members of his position immediately began to repel the attackers, utilizing hand grenades, antipersonnel mines and small-arms fire. Due to the heavy volume of enemy fire and exploding grenades around them, a North Vietnamese soldier was able to crawl, undetected, to their position. Suddenly, the enemy soldier lobbed a hand grenade into Sp4c. Santiago-Colón's foxhole. Realizing that there was no time to throw the grenade out of his position, Sp4c. Santiago-Colón retrieved the grenade, tucked it in to his stomach and, turning away from his comrades, absorbed the full impact of the blast. Heroic self-sacrifice saved the lives of those who occupied the foxhole with him, and provided them with the inspiration to continue fighting until they had forced the enemy to retreat from the perimeter. By his gallantry at the cost of his life and in the highest traditions of the military service, Sp4c. Santiago-Colón has reflected great credit upon himself, his unit, and the U.S. Army.

In memory:

In July 1975, The Puerto Rican National Guard renamed their base "Camp Salinas", which is located close to Santiago-Colón's birth town, with the name "Camp Santiago" in his honor. He was the second Puerto Rican to be so honored. The first Puerto Rican who has a base named after him is Marine PFC Fernando Luis García. Santiago-Colón's name on the Vietnam Veterans Memorial is located at Panel 54W Line 013. Santiago-Colón's name is also inscribed in "El Monumento de la Recordación" (Monument of Remembrance), dedicated to Puerto Rico's fallen soldiers and situated in front of the Capitol Building in San Juan, Puerto Rico. His remains are buried in the Cementerio Municipal de Salinas – Salinas, Puerto Rico.

=== Humbert Roque Versace ===
Captain Humbert Roque Versace* (July 2, 1937 – September 26, 1965) born in Honolulu, Hawaii, was a United States Army Captain of Puerto Rican-Italian descent who was awarded the United States' highest military decoration – the Medal of Honor – for his heroic actions while a prisoner of war (POW) during the Vietnam War. He was the first member of the U.S. Army to be awarded the Medal of Honor for actions performed while in captivity in Southeast Asia.

Medal of Honor citation:

Humbert Roque Versace
Rank and organization:Captain, U.S. Army, Intelligence Advisor, Special Operations
Place:Republic of Vietnam
Entered service at:Norfolk, Virginia
Born:Honolulu, Hawaii
Citation:

For conspicuous gallantry and intrepidity at the risk of his life above and beyond the call of duty while a prisoner of war during the period of 29 October 1963 to 26 September 1965 in the Republic of Vietnam. While accompanying a Civilian Irregular Defense Group patrol engaged in combat operations in Thoi Binh District, An Xuyen Province, Republic of Vietnam on 29 October 1963, Captain Versace and the CIDG assault force were caught in an ambush from intense mortar, automatic weapons, and small arms fire from elements of a reinforced enemy Main Force battalion. As the battle raged, Captain Versace fought valiantly and encouraged his CIDG patrol to return fire against overwhelming enemy forces. He provided covering fire from an exposed position to enable friendly forces to withdraw from the killing zone when it was apparent that their position would be overrun, and was severely wounded in the knee and back from automatic weapons fire and shrapnel. He stubbornly resisted capture with the last full measure of his strength and ammunition. Taken prisoner by the Viet Cong, he demonstrated exceptional leadership and resolute adherence to the tenets of the Code of Conduct from the time he entered into a prisoner of war status. Captain Versace assumed command of his fellow American prisoners, and despite being kept locked in irons in an isolation box, raised their morale by singing messages to popular songs of the day, and leaving inspiring messages at the latrine. Within three weeks of captivity, and despite the severity of his untreated wounds, he attempted the first of four escape attempts by dragging himself on his hands and knees out of the camp through dense swamp and forbidding vegetation to freedom. Crawling at a very slow pace due to his weakened condition, the guards quickly discovered him outside the camp and recaptured him. Captain Versace scorned the enemy's exhaustive interrogation and indoctrination efforts, and inspired his fellow prisoners to resist to the best of their ability. When he used his Vietnamese language skills to protest improper treatment of the American prisoners by the guards, he was put into leg irons and gagged to keep his protestations out of earshot of the other American prisoners in the camp. The last time that any of his fellow prisoners heard from him, Captain Versace was singing God Bless America at the top of his voice from his isolation box. Unable to break his indomitable will, his faith in God, and his trust in the United States of America and his fellow prisoners, Captain Versace was executed by the Viet Cong on 26 September 1965. Captain Versaces extraordinary heroism, self-sacrifice, and personal bravery involving conspicuous risk of life above and beyond the call of duty were in keeping with the highest traditions of the United States Army, and reflect great credit to himself and the U.S. Armed Forces.

In memory:

On July 9, 2002, Secretary of the Army Thomas E. White and Army Chief of Staff General Eric K. Shinseki inducted Versace into the Pentagon Hall of Heroes. Versace's capture and execution was chronicled in the book Five Years to Freedom by Nick Rowe.

There is a statue with the likeness of Versace located in the Rocky Versace Plaza, made possible with a donation of $125,000 raised by the citizens of Alexandria, Virginia. On Memorial Day of 2007, Versace's name was inscribed in Puerto Rico's monument "El Monumento de la Recordacion". Versace's remains have never been recovered. His headstone at Arlington National Cemetery stands above an empty grave and can be located in the Memorial section MG-108.

== El Monumento de la Recordación ==
El Monumento de la Recordación

The names of the first four Puerto Rican Medal of Honor recipients were among the original inscriptions in El Monumento de la Recordación (English: Monument of Remembrance) which is dedicated to the Puerto Ricans (both those who were born in the island and/or those who were born elsewhere, but are of Puerto Rican descent) who have fallen in combat as members of the Armed Forces of the United States. Versace's inscription was subsequently unveiled by then-Senate president Kenneth McClintock and then-Speaker José Aponte. The monument, an initiative of then-Senate Majority Leader Charlie Rodríguez, erected during the Senate presidency of Roberto Rexach Benítez, is located in front of the Capitol Building of Puerto Rico in San Juan. There are paintings of each of the first four Puerto Rican Medal of Honor recipients, by the late Cuban-Venezuelan artist Estrella Díaz, inside the Capitol Building in Puerto Rico.

== Medal of Honor photo gallery ==
Puerto Rican Medal of Honor recipients Gallery

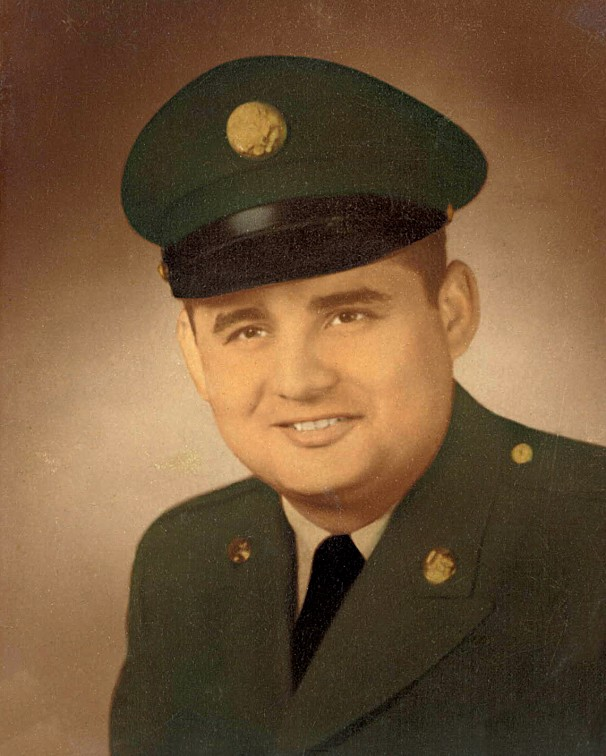
Conde Falcón, Félix

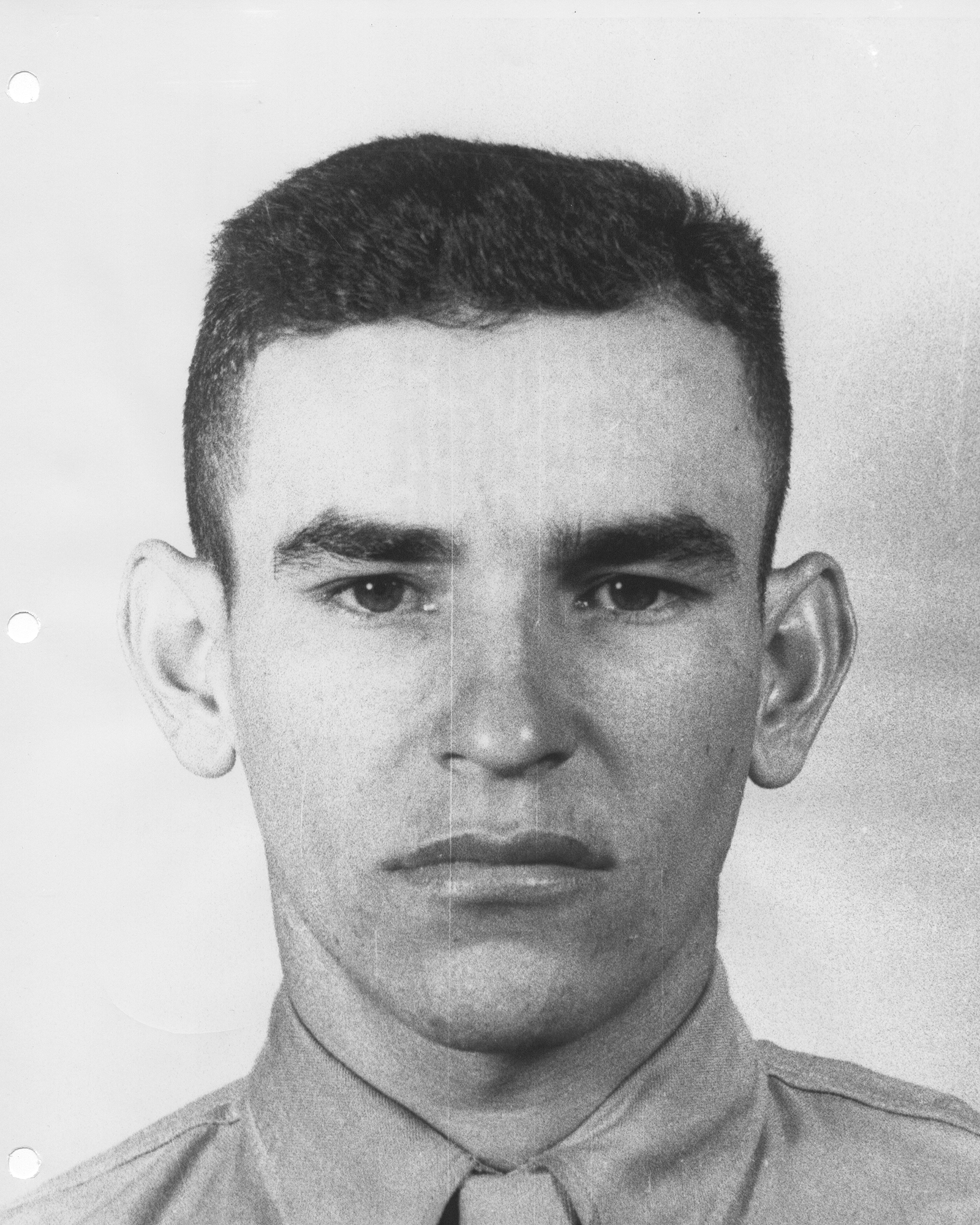
Garcia, Fernando Luis

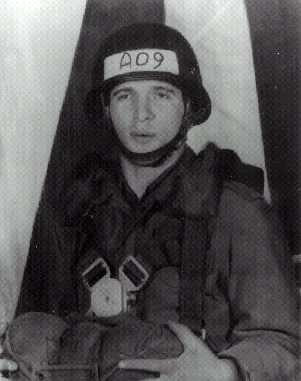
Lozada, Carlos James

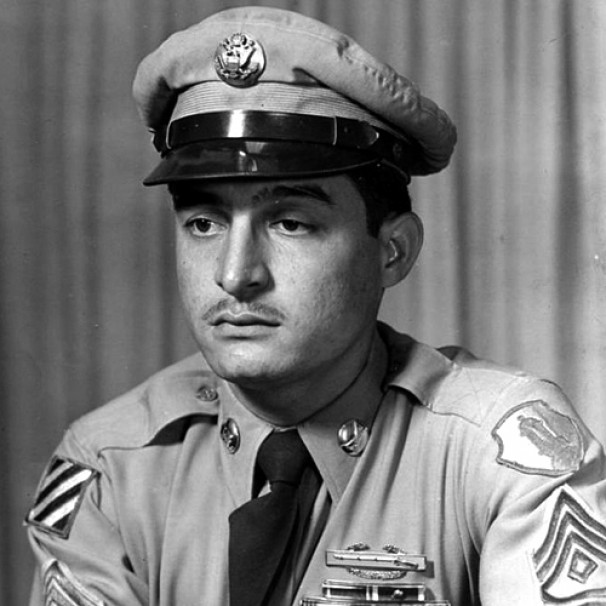
Negrón, Juan E.

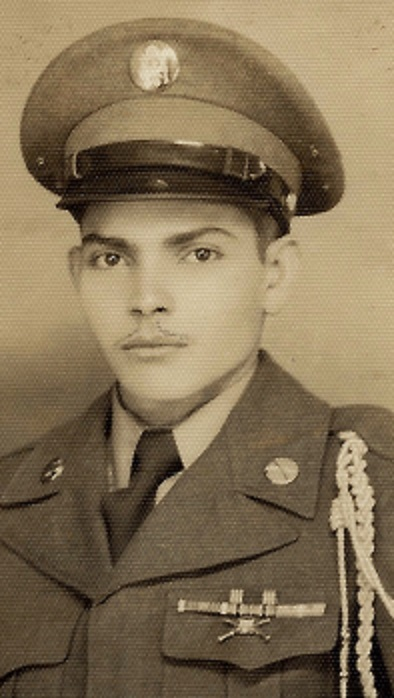
Rivera, Demensio

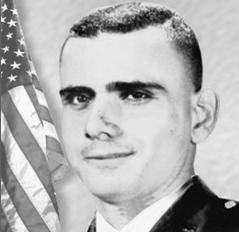
Rubio, Euripides

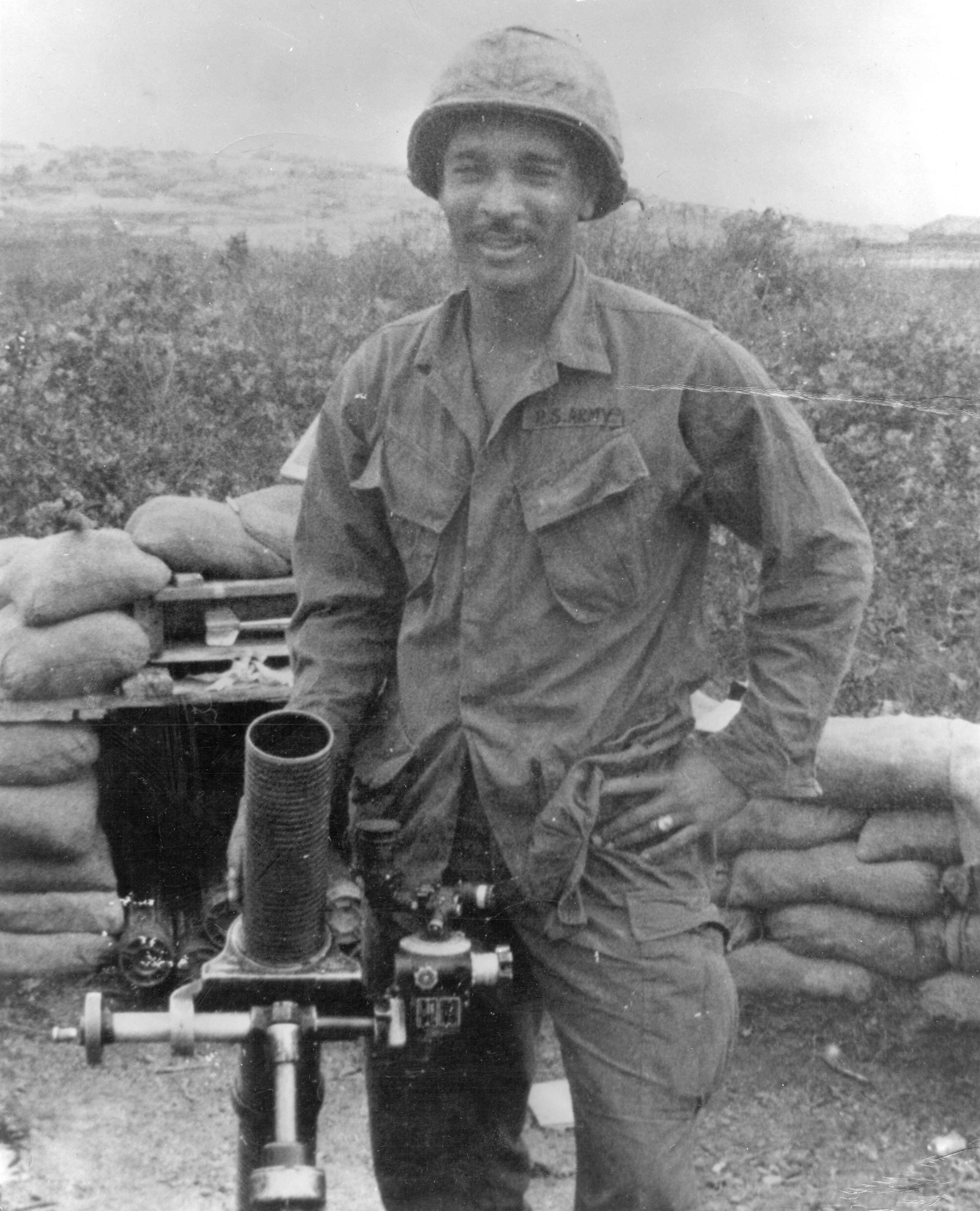
Santiago-Colon, Hector

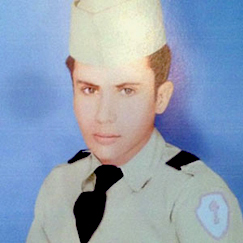
Vera, Miguel

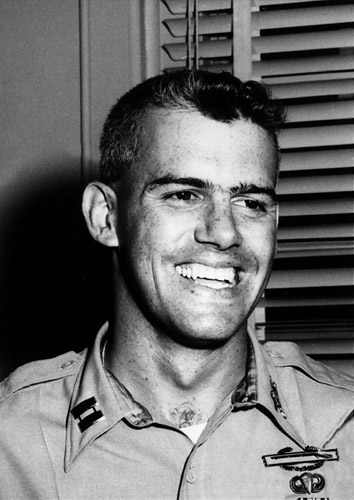
Versace, Humbert Roque

== See also ==
- List of Puerto Ricans-Military
- Puerto Rican recipients of the Distinguished Service Cross
- Puerto Rican recipients of the Navy Cross
- List of Hispanic Medal of Honor recipients
- El Grito de Lares
- Intentona de Yauco
- List of Puerto Ricans
- List of Puerto Rican military personnel
- Military history of Puerto Rico
- Puerto Rican Campaign
- Puerto Ricans in World War I
- Puerto Ricans in World War II
- Puerto Ricans in the Vietnam War
- Puerto Ricans Missing in Action - Korean War
- Puerto Ricans Missing in Action - Vietnam War
- Puerto Rican Nationalist Party Revolts of the 1950s
- Puerto Rican women in the military
- 65th Infantry Regiment
- Puerto Rican recipients of the Presidential Medal of Freedom
- Puerto Rican recipients of the Presidential Citizens Medal

== Notes ==
- N.B. An asterisk after the name indicates that the award was given posthumously.
