= Humbert Roque Versace =

United States Army Medal of Honor recipient

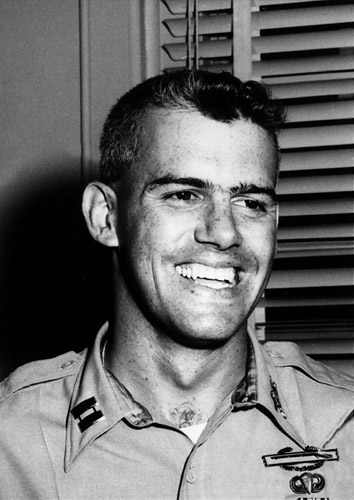
- Captain Humbert Roque Versace, Medal of Honor recipient
- Born: July 2, 1937; Honolulu, Hawaii, US
- Died: September 26, 1965 (aged 28); U Minh forest swamp, An Xuyen Province (Ca Mau), South Vietnam
- Cause of death: Execution by firing squad
- Burial place: Remains never recovered; memorial headstone in Arlington National Cemetery, Arlington, Virginia
- Military career
- Allegiance: United States
- Branch: United States Army
- Service years: 1959–1965
- Rank: Captain
- Nickname: Rocky
- Unit: Military Assistance Advisory Group
- Conflicts: Vietnam War (POW)
- Awards: Medal of Honor; Purple Heart

Captain Humbert Roque "Rocky" Versace (July 2, 1937 – September 26, 1965) was a United States Army officer of Puerto Rican–Italian descent who was posthumously awarded the United States' highest military decoration—the Medal of Honor—for his heroic actions while a prisoner of war (POW) during the Vietnam War. He was the first member of the U.S. Army to be awarded the Medal of Honor for actions performed in Southeast Asia while in captivity.

== Early years ==
Humbert Roque Versace was born in Honolulu, Hawaii, on July 2, 1937. He was the eldest of five children born to Marie Teresa Ríos (1917–1999)—the author of three books, including the Fifteenth Pelican, on which The Flying Nun (starring Sally Field), the TV series of the 1960s, was based—and Colonel Humbert Joseph Versace (1911–1972). Versace grew up in Alexandria, Virginia, and attended Gonzaga College High School in Washington, D.C. during his freshman and sophomore years. His junior year he attended Frankfurt American High School in Germany. He graduated from Norfolk Catholic High School in his senior year. He joined the Armed Forces in Norfolk, Virginia. As had his father before him, Versace entered the United States Military Academy West Point. He graduated in 1959 and was commissioned a Second Lieutenant of Armor in the U.S. Army.

Versace was a member of the Ranger Class 4–59 and was awarded the Ranger Tab on December 18, 1959. Upon graduation from Ranger School, Captain Versace attended Airborne School and was awarded the Parachutist Badge. He then served with the 3rd Battalion, 40th Armor, 1st Cavalry Division in the Republic of Korea as an M-48 tank platoon leader from March 1960 to April 1961. Captain Versace was then assigned to the 3rd U.S. Infantry (Old Guard), where he served as a tank platoon leader in Headquarters and Headquarters Company. After volunteering for duty in Vietnam, he attended the Military Assistance Institute, the Intelligence course at Fort Holabird, Maryland, and the USACS Vietnamese language Course at the Presidio of Monterey.

== Vietnam War ==
On May 12, 1962, Versace began his first tour of duty in the Republic of Vietnam as an intelligence advisor. In May 1963, he volunteered for a six-month extension of his tour. He planned to attend seminary at the conclusion of his service and join the Catholic priesthood, hoping to return to Vietnam as a missionary working with orphans.

Less than two weeks before the end of his tour, on October 29, 1963, while visiting a Military Academy classmate in Detachment A-23, 5th Special Forces Group in the Mekong Delta, Versace accompanied several companies of South Vietnamese Civilian Irregular Defense (CIDG) troops who had attacked to remove a Viet Cong command post located in the U Minh Forest, a VC stronghold. A VC Main Force battalion ambushed and overran Versace's unit, wounding him in the process. He was able to provide enough covering fire so that the CIDG forces could withdraw from the killing zone.

A second government force of about 200 men operating only a few thousand yards from the main fight learned of the disaster too late to help. U.S. authorities said the communist radio jammers had knocked out both the main channel and the alternate channel on all local military radios. Versace was captured and taken to a prison deep in the jungle along with two other Americans, Lieutenant Nick Rowe and Sergeant Dan Pitzer. He tried to escape four times but failed in his attempts. Versace insulted the Viet Cong during the indoctrination sessions and cited the Geneva Convention treaty time after time. The Viet Cong separated Versace from the other prisoners. The last time the prisoners heard his voice, he was loudly singing "God Bless America".

== Execution and legacy ==
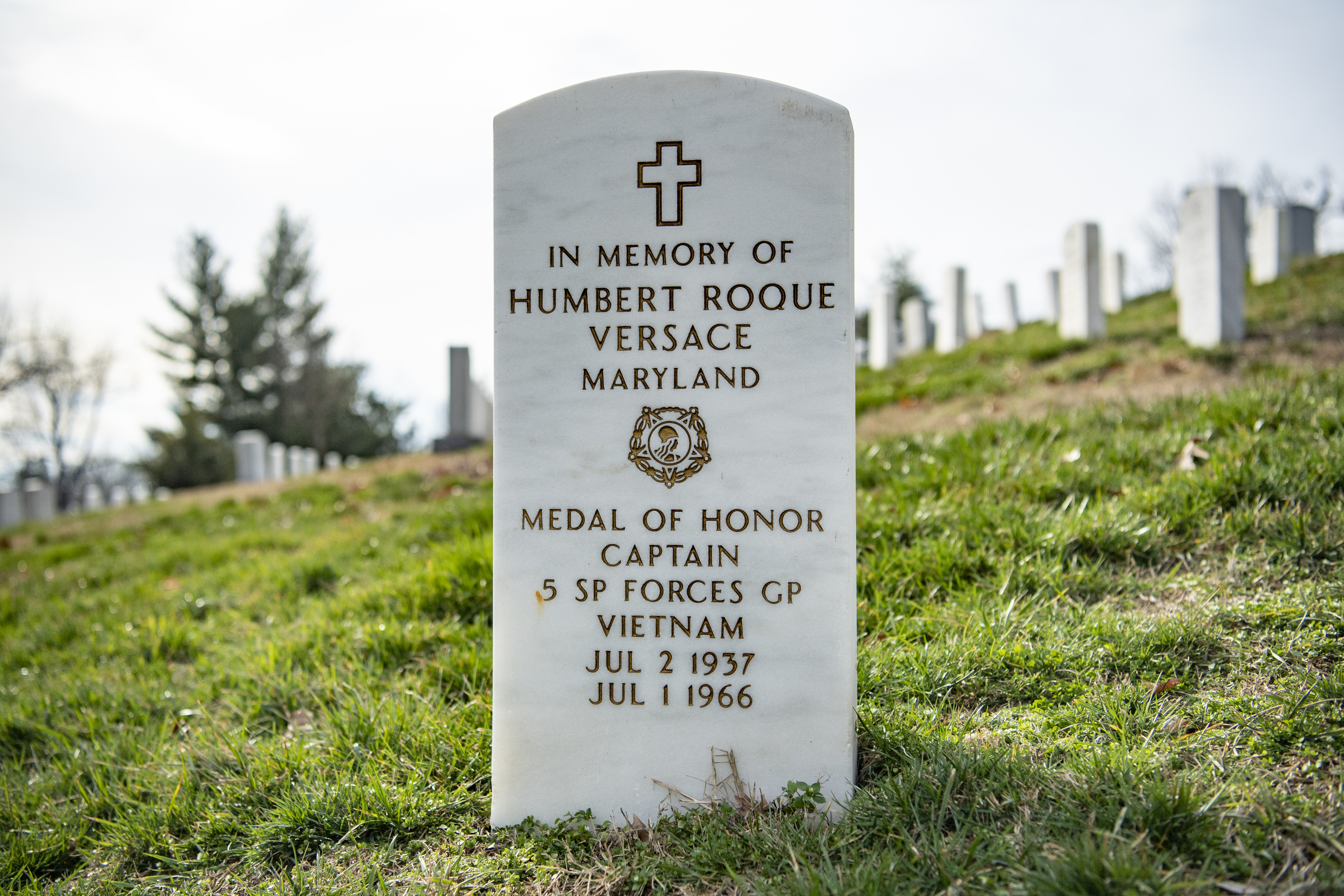
Memorial marker at Arlington National Cemetery

On September 26, 1965, North Vietnam's "Liberation Radio" announced the execution of Captain Humbert Roque Versace. Versace was executed by firing squad in the U Minh forest swamp and his body was buried there as revenge for his insults to the Viet Cong.

Versace's remains have never been recovered from the swamp and are now lost. His headstone at Arlington National Cemetery is a cenotaph as it stands above an empty grave and can be located in the Memorial section MG-108.

Upon learning of their son's fate, Marie Teresa Rios Versace and her husband, Colonel Versace, tried to find out what they could about the circumstances. She went to Paris in the late 1960s, trying unsuccessfully to see the North Vietnamese delegation as it arrived for peace talks. Rios Versace expressed her frustration and anguish in poems.

Nominations to award Versace the Medal of Honor were initiated in 1969, but the nomination failed, and he was posthumously awarded the Silver Star instead. The quest for a Medal of Honor for Versace languished until the "Friends of Rocky Versace" reinitiated the crusade once more in 1999. Language added by Congress in the 2002 Defense Authorization Act ended the standoff and authorized the award of the nation's highest military decoration to Versace.

On July 8, 2002, in a ceremony in the White House East Room, Versace was posthumously awarded the Medal of Honor by President George W. Bush for his heroism, the first time an Army POW had been awarded the nation's highest honor for actions in captivity. Present were his surviving siblings, Dr. Stephen Versace; Richard (former coach of the Indiana Pacers), Michael, and Trilby Versace. On November 7, 2008, the Department of the Army announced the revocation of Versace's Silver Star because it was upgraded to the Medal of Honor:

HEADQUARTERS
DEPARTMENT OF THE ARMY
WASHINGTON, DC, 29 December 2009

IV—SILVER STAR-REVOKE. So much of Department of the Army General Orders, No. 31, Headquarters, Department of the Army, Washington, D.C., dated 1 July 1971, pertaining to the award of the Silver Star to Captain Humbert R. Versace, United States Army, is herein revoked; as announced in United States Human Resources Command, Permanent Orders 312-07, dated 7 November 2008.

=== Medal of Honor citation ===

Humbert Roque Versace
Rank and organization: Captain, U.S. Army, Intelligence Advisor, Special Operations
Place: Republic of Vietnam
Entered service at: Norfolk, Virginia
Born: Honolulu, Hawaii
Citation:

For conspicuous gallantry and intrepidity at the risk of his life above and beyond the call of duty while a prisoner of war during the period of October 29, 1963 to September 26, 1965 in the Republic of Vietnam. While accompanying a Civilian Irregular Defense Group patrol engaged in combat operations in Thoi Binh District, An Xuyen Province, Republic of Vietnam on October 29, 1963, Captain Versace and the CIDG assault force were caught in an ambush from intense mortar, automatic weapons, and small arms fire from elements of a reinforced enemy Main Force battalion. As the battle raged, Captain Versace fought valiantly and encouraged his CIDG patrol to return fire against overwhelming enemy forces. He provided covering fire from an exposed position to enable friendly forces to withdraw from the killing zone when it was apparent that their position would be overrun, and was severely wounded in the knee and back from automatic weapons fire and shrapnel. He stubbornly resisted capture with the last full measure of his strength and ammunition. Taken prisoner by the Viet Cong, he demonstrated exceptional leadership and resolute adherence to the tenets of the Code of Conduct from the time he entered into a prisoner of war status. Captain Versace assumed command of his fellow American prisoners, and despite being kept locked in irons in an isolation box, raised their morale by singing messages to popular songs of the day, and leaving inspiring messages at the latrine. Within three weeks of captivity, and despite the severity of his untreated wounds, he attempted the first of four escape attempts by dragging himself on his hands and knees out of the camp through dense swamp and forbidding vegetation to freedom. Crawling at a very slow pace due to his weakened condition, the guards quickly discovered him outside the camp and recaptured him. Captain Versace scorned the enemy's exhaustive interrogation and indoctrination efforts, and inspired his fellow prisoners to resist to the best of their ability. When he used his Vietnamese language skills to protest improper treatment of the American prisoners by the guards, he was put into leg irons and gagged to keep his protestations out of earshot of the other American prisoners in the camp. The last time that any of his fellow prisoners heard from him, Captain Versace was singing God Bless America at the top of his voice from his isolation box. Unable to break his indomitable will, his faith in God, and his trust in the United States of America and his fellow prisoners, Captain Versace was executed by the Viet Cong on September 26, 1965. Captain Versace's extraordinary heroism, self-sacrifice, and personal bravery involving conspicuous risk of life above and beyond the call of duty were in keeping with the highest traditions of the United States Army, and reflect great credit to himself and the U.S. Armed Forces.

== Awards and decorations ==
Among Capt. Humbert Roque Versace's military decorations are the following:

Medal of Honor		Purple Heart w/ 1 bronze oak leaf cluster
Prisoner of War Medal (retroactive)	National Defense Service Medal	Armed Forces Expeditionary Medal
Vietnam Service Medal w/ bronze campaign star	Korean Defense Service Medal (retroactive)	Vietnam Campaign Medal

Republic of Vietnam Gallantry Cross Unit Citation

Badges:

- Combat Infantryman Badge
- Parachutist badge

Tabs:

- Ranger Tab

== In memory ==
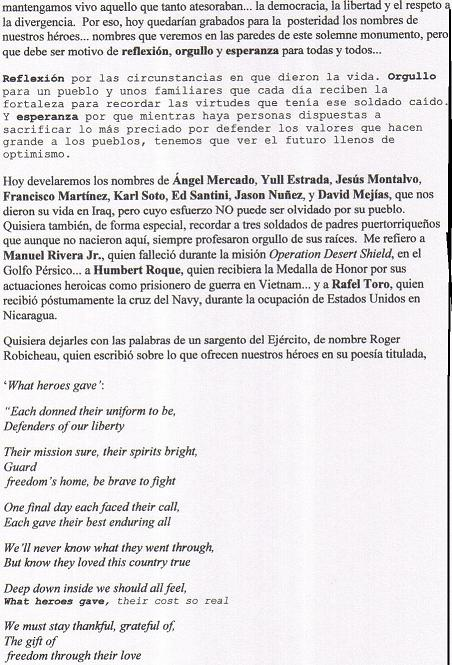
Portion of Memorial Day dedication speech by Puerto Rico Senate President Kenneth McClintock

The name Humbert R Versace is inscribed on the Vietnam Veterans Memorial ("The Wall") on Panel 01E, Row 033. On July 6, 2002, Rocky Versace Plaza in Alexandria, Virginia, was dedicated in honor of Humbert R. Versace. There is a statue with the likeness of Versace in the Plaza, which was made possible with a donation of $125,000 raised by the citizens of Alexandria, Virginia. On July 9, 2002, the day after the White House Medal of Honor ceremony, Secretary of the Army Thomas E. White and Army Chief of Staff General Eric K. Shinseki inducted Versace into the Pentagon Hall of Heroes.

In 2003, he was inducted into the Military Intelligence Corps Hall of Fame. The Military Intelligence Hall of Fame is a Hall of Fame established by the Military Intelligence Corps of the United States Army in 1988 to honor soldiers and civilians who have made exceptional contributions to Military Intelligence. The Hall is administered by the United States Army Intelligence Center at Fort Huachuca, Arizona.

The name of Humbert Roque Versace was engraved in "El Monumento de la Recordación" (Monument of Remembrance), dedicated to Puerto Rico's fallen military members and situated in front of the Capitol Building in San Juan, Puerto Rico, and unveiled by Puerto Rico Senate President Kenneth McClintock (see copy of speech) and PR National Guard Adjutant General Col. David Carrión on Memorial Day, 2007.

Versace's name and Medal of Honor citation are memorialized in a plaque on the side of MacArthur Barracks at the United States Military Academy in West Point, New York. Similar plaques around the building honor the Academy graduates who also received the Medal of Honor during the Pacific Ocean theater of World War II.

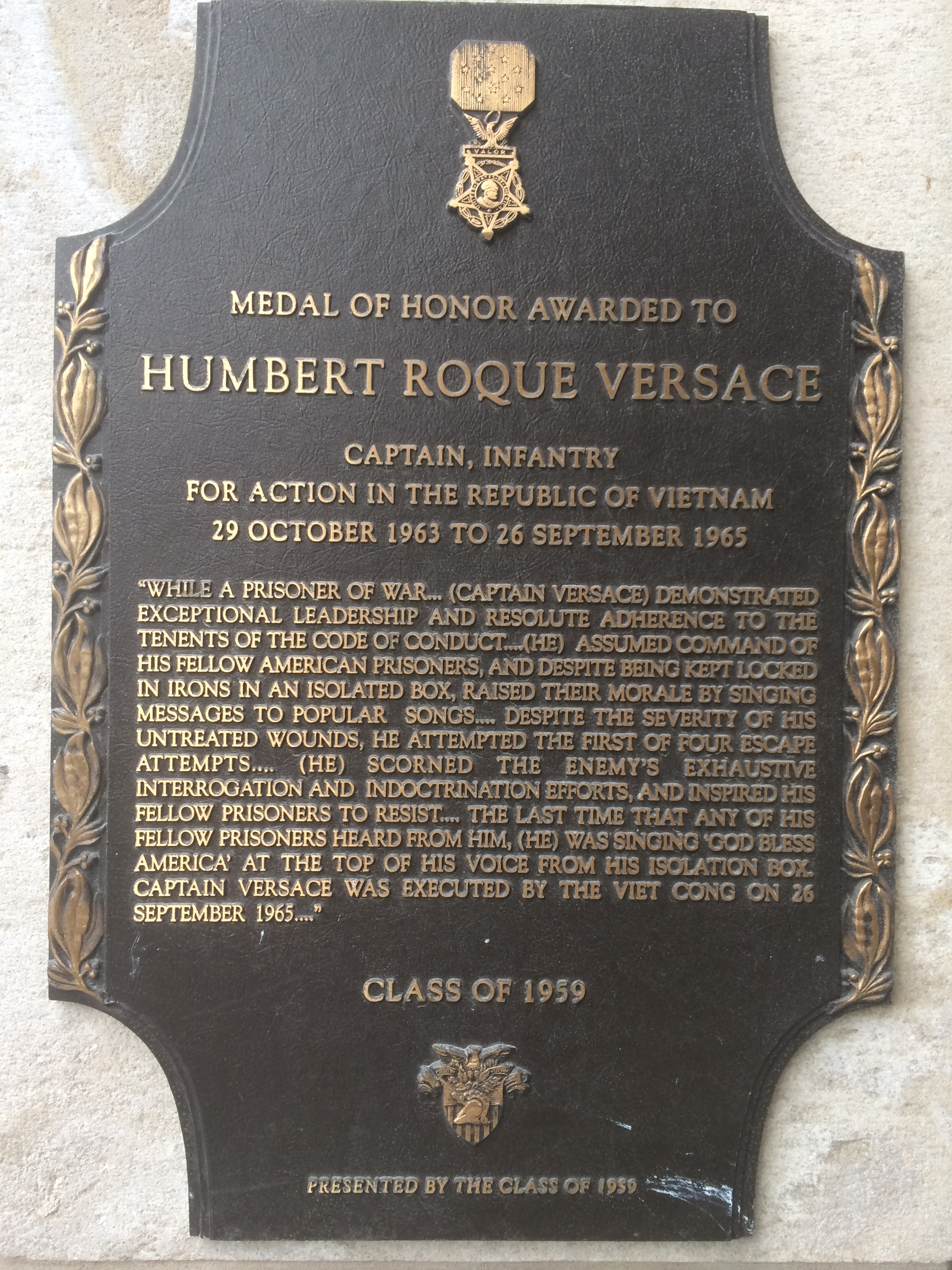
Humbert Versace's memorial plaque outside MacArthur Barracks at West Point

== See also ==
- List of Puerto Ricans
- List of Puerto Rican military personnel
- Puerto Rican recipients of the Medal of Honor
- List of Hispanic Medal of Honor recipients
- List of Medal of Honor recipients for the Vietnam War
- List of Italian American Medal of Honor recipients
