= Héctor Santiago-Colón =

United States Army Medal of Honor recipient

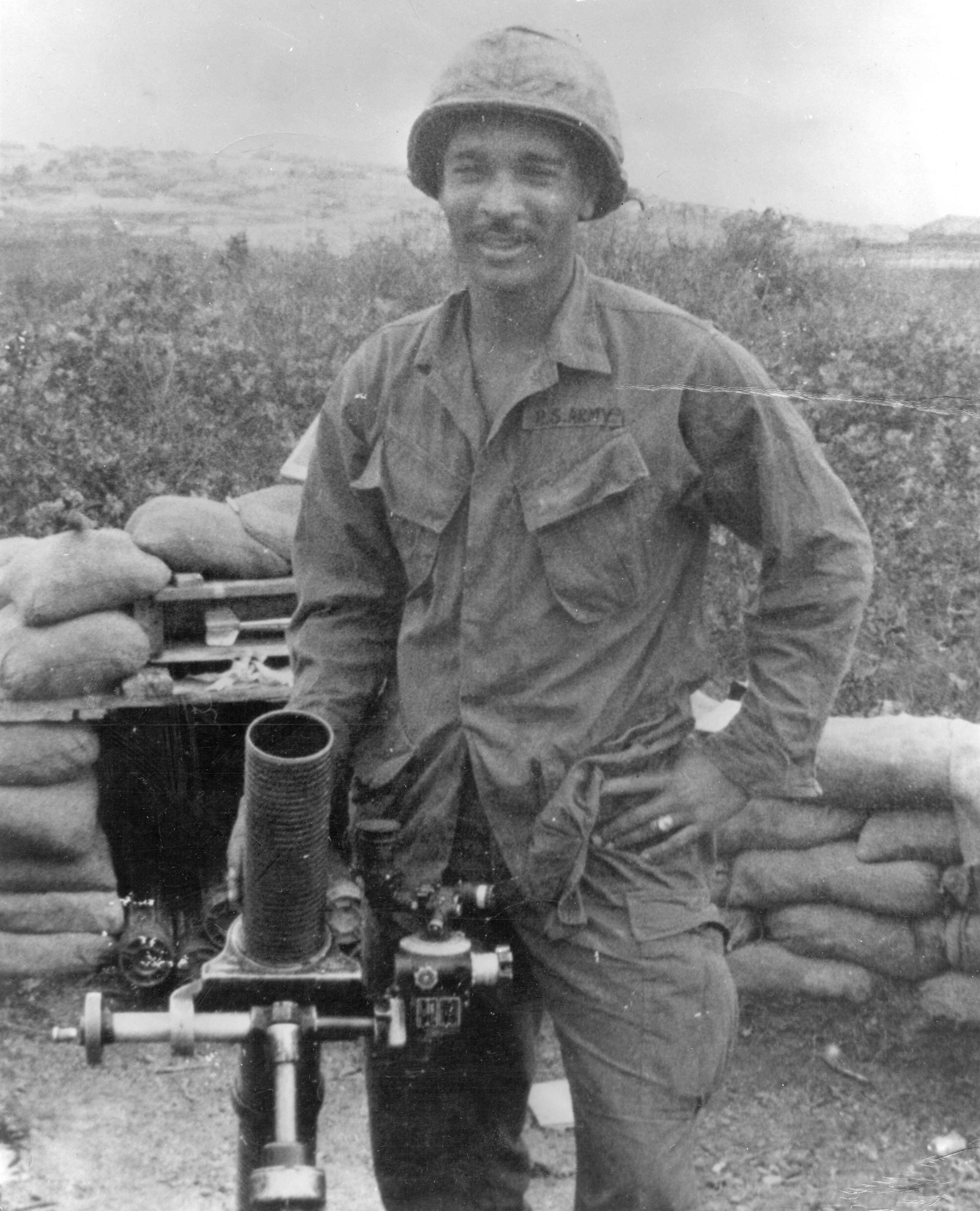
- Sp4 Héctor Santiago-Colón
- Born: December 20, 1942; Salinas, Puerto Rico
- Died: June 28, 1968 (aged 25); Quang Tri Province, Republic of Vietnam
- Burial place: Salinas Municipal Cemetery, Salinas, Puerto Rico
- Military career
- Allegiance: United States of America
- Branch: United States Army
- Service years: 1967–1968
- Rank: Specialist Four
- Units: Company B, 5th Battalion, 7th Cavalry Regiment, 1st Cavalry Division
- Conflicts: Vietnam War: Operation Jeb Stuart III †
- Awards: Medal of Honor; Purple Heart

Héctor Santiago-Colón (December 20, 1942 – June 28, 1968) is one of nine Puerto Ricans who have been posthumously presented with the Medal of Honor, the highest military decoration awarded by the United States. His actions on June 28, 1968, during the Vietnam War saved the lives of his comrades.

== Early years ==
Santiago-Colón was one of twelve siblings born to Pablo Santiago and Petronila Colón in Salinas, Puerto Rico. There he received his primary and secondary education. In 1960 his family moved to the mainland United States and lived in New York City. After living in the city for a short time, Santiago-Colón decided that he wanted to be part of the NYPD (New York City Police Department), however, at the time, in order to become a member of the NYPD you had to be a veteran. Santiago-Colon then volunteered to join the United States Army. He was engaged to be married to his elementary school sweetheart at the time. After completing his basic training, he was assigned to a unit stationed in the Republic of Vietnam.

== Action in Vietnam ==
On June 28, 1968, members of Santiago-Colón's Company B of the 5th Battalion, 7th Cavalry Regiment, 1st Cavalry Division were engaged in combat in Quang Tri Province during Operation Jeb Stuart III. A North Vietnamese soldier threw a hand grenade into Santiago-Colón's foxhole. Realizing that there was no time to throw out the grenade, he tucked it in to his stomach and turning away from his comrades, absorbed the full impact of the blast, sacrificing his life to save his fellow soldiers from certain death.

Santiago-Colón posthumously received the Medal of Honor for conspicuous gallantry and intrepidity in action at the risk of his own life above and beyond the call of duty. The award was presented to his family in a ceremony at the White House by President Richard M. Nixon on April 7, 1970. His remains are buried in the city of Salinas, Puerto Rico.

== Medal of Honor citation ==

The President of the United States in the name of The Congress takes pleasure in presenting the Medal of Honor to:
SANTIAGO-COLON, HECTOR
Rank and organization: Specialist Four, U.S. Army, Company B, 5th Battalion, 7th Cavalry, 1st Cavalry Division (Airmobile).
Place and date: Quang Tri Province, Republic of Vietnam, June 28, 1968.
Entered service at: New York, N.Y.
Born: December 20, 1942, Salinas, Puerto Rico.
Citation:

For conspicuous gallantry and intrepidity in action at the risk of his life above and beyond the call of duty. Realizing that there was no time to throw the grenade out of his position, he retrieved the grenade, tucked it in to his stomach and, turning away from his comrades, absorbed the full impact of the blast. Sp4 Santiago-Colón distinguished himself at the cost of his life while serving as a gunner in the mortar platoon of Company B. While serving as a perimeter sentry, Sp4 Santiago-Colón heard distinct movement in the heavily wooded area to his front and flanks. He alerted his fellow sentries in the area to move to their foxholes and remain alert for any enemy probing forces. From the wooded area around his position heavy enemy automatic weapons and small arms fire suddenly broke out, but extreme darkness rendered difficult the precise location and identification of the hostile force. Only the muzzle flashes from enemy weapons indicated their position. Sp4 Santiago-Colón and the other members of his position immediately began to repel the attackers, utilizing hand grenades, antipersonnel mines and small-arms fire. Due to the heavy volume of enemy fire and exploding grenades around them, a North Vietnamese soldier was able to crawl, undetected, to their position. Suddenly, the enemy soldier lobbed a hand grenade into Sp4 Santiago-Colón's foxhole. Realizing that there was no time to throw the grenade out of his position, Sp4 Santiago-Colón retrieved the grenade, tucked it in to his stomach and, turning away from his comrades, absorbed the full impact of the blast. Heroic self-sacrifice saved the lives of those who occupied the foxhole with him, and provided them with the inspiration to continue fighting until they had forced the enemy to retreat from the perimeter. By his gallantry at the cost of his life and in the highest traditions of the military service, Sp4 Santiago-Colón has reflected great credit upon himself, his unit, and the U.S. Army.

== Honors ==
- In July 1975, the Puerto Rico National Guard renamed their training base "Camp Salinas", which is located close to Santiago-Colón's birth town, with the name Camp Santiago in his honor.
- Santiago-Colón's name on the Vietnam Veterans Memorial is located at Panel 54W Line 013.
- Santiago-Colón's name is also inscribed in "El Monumento de la Recordación" (Monument of Remembrance), dedicated to Puerto Rico's fallen soldiers and situated in front of the Capitol Building in San Juan, Puerto Rico. On November 11, 2008, the Government of Puerto Rico unveiled in the Capitol Rotunda the oil portrait of Santiago-Colón.
- In 1977 a gym at Fort Benning was named Santiago Fitness Center on Sand Hill in honor of Specialist Santiago Colón.
- In 2017 Héctor Santiago-Colón was posthumously inducted to the Puerto Rico Veterans Hall of Fame.

== Military decorations awarded ==
El Monumento de la Recordacion

Combat Infantryman Badge
Medal of Honor		Purple Heart
National Defense Service Medal	Vietnam Service Medal with one bronze service star	Vietnam Campaign Medal

== See also ==
- List of Puerto Ricans
- List of Puerto Rican military personnel
- Puerto Rican recipients of the Medal of Honor
- List of Hispanic Medal of Honor recipients
- List of Medal of Honor recipients
- List of Medal of Honor recipients for the Vietnam War
