= Manuel V. Mendoza =

Medal of Honor Recipient

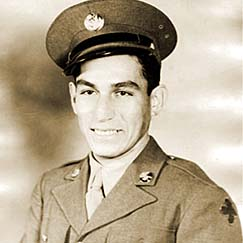
- Born: June 15, 1922; Miami, Arizona, US
- Died: December 12, 2001 (aged 79); Mesa, Arizona, US
- Burial place: Mountain View Funeral Home and Cemetery, Mesa, Arizona
- Military career
- Allegiance: United States of America
- Branch: United States Army
- Service years: 1942–1945; 1949–1953
- Rank: Master sergeant
- Units: Company B, 350th Infantry, 88th Infantry Division
- Conflicts: World War II; Korean War
- Awards: Medal of Honor; Bronze Star Medal; Purple Heart (2)

Manuel Verdugo Mendoza (June 15, 1922 – December 12, 2001) was a United States Army master sergeant and Medal of Honor recipient.

== Military service ==
Mendoza was drafted into the United States Army in November 1942. He reported for duty at Fort MacArthur, California, for basic training; before being sent to Camp Gruber, Oklahoma as a member of the 350th Infantry Regiment, 88th Infantry Division. He deployed with the regiment overseas on December 6, 1943, arriving in Casablanca, French Morocco on December 15. He, and the rest of the 88th Infantry Division, trained in Magenta, Algeria, in preparation for combat operations in Italy, until February 1944. On February 6, 1944, Mendoza landed with the 88th, in Naples, Italy. He first saw combat on March 11, 1944 when his regiment relieved a British infantry division on the GUSTAV Line. He participated in Operation Diadem in May 1944, seeing combat during the captures of Spigno, Mount Civita, Itri, Fondi, Raccagorga, and Anzio. He was present when the 88th Infantry Division entered Rome on June 4, 1944. Mendoza went on to see combat throughout the Arno Campaign in July–August 1944. He participated in the 88th Infantry Division's GOTHIC Line offensive in September 1944, including the capture of Mount Battaglia. After his heroic actions on October 4, 1944, he became known in his regiment as "The Arizona Kid".

Mendoza was wounded on October 4, 1944 and would return to his unit in January 1945. He was present for the 1945 Spring Offensive, and entered Austria on the 30th of April 1945. The war ended while his unit linked up with the 103rd Infantry Division in Innsbruck. Mendoza would serve in the Occupation of Austria on the Morgan Line until September 1945 when he was discharged at the rank of Staff Sergeant. Soon after returning home he enlisted in the Arizona Army National Guard. He re-enlisted for active duty in 1948. He went on to serve in the Korean War, where he was wounded once again. He was honourably discharged in 1953.

== Medal of Honor action and citation ==
Mendoza is credited with single-handedly breaking up a German counterattack on October 4, 1944, at Mt. Battaglia, Italy. He was originally awarded the Distinguished Service Cross for his bravery.

Mendoza's widow, Alice, accepted the Medal of Honor on his behalf during a White House ceremony.

Nearly 70 years would pass before his heroism was properly recognized with the Medal of Honor. That belated recognition came through the Defense Authorization Act, which called for a review of Jewish American and Hispanic American veterans from World War II, the Korean War and the Vietnam War who had been awarded the Distinguished Service Cross to see if they had been denied the Medal of Honor by prejudice. Mendoza was awarded the Medal of Honor by President Barack Obama in a March 18, 2014, ceremony in the White House. As Mendoza had died in 2001, his widow accepted his award.

His citation reads:

For conspicuous gallantry and intrepidity at the risk of his life above and beyond the call of duty: Staff Sergeant Manuel V. Mendoza distinguished himself by acts of gallantry and intrepidity above and beyond the call of duty while serving as a Platoon Sergeant with Company B, 350th Infantry, 88th Infantry Division during combat operations against an armed enemy on Mt. Battaglia, Italy on October 4, 1944. That afternoon, the enemy launched a violent counterattack preceded by a heavy mortar barrage. Staff Sergeant Mendoza, already wounded in the arm and leg, grabbed a Thompson sub-machinegun and ran to the crest of the hill where he saw approximately 200 enemy troops charging up the slopes employing flame-throwers, machine pistols, rifles, and hand grenades. Staff Sergeant Mendoza immediately began to engage the enemy, firing five clips and killing ten enemy soldiers. After exhausting his ammunition, he picked up a carbine and emptied its magazine at the enemy. By this time, an enemy soldier with a flame-thrower had almost reached the crest, but was quickly eliminated as Staff Sergeant Mendoza drew his pistol and fired. Seeing that the enemy force continued to advance, Staff Sergeant Mendoza jumped into a machinegun emplacement that had just been abandoned and opened fire. Unable to engage the entire enemy force from his location, he picked up the machinegun and moved forward, firing from his hip and spraying a withering hail of bullets into the oncoming enemy, causing them to break into confusion. He then set the machinegun on the ground and continued to fire until the gun jammed. Without hesitating, Staff Sergeant Mendoza began throwing hand grenades at the enemy, causing them to flee. After the enemy had withdrawn, he advanced down the forward slope of the hill, retrieved numerous enemy weapons scattered about the area, captured a wounded enemy soldier, and returned to consolidate friendly positions with all available men. Staff Sergeant Mendoza's gallant stand resulted in thirty German soldiers killed and the successful defense of the hill. Staff Sergeant Mendoza's extraordinary heroism and selflessness above and beyond the call of duty are in keeping with the highest traditions of military service and reflect great credit upon himself, his unit and the United States Army.

== Awards and decorations ==
Mendoza awards include:

Badge	Combat Infantryman Badge with star denoting 2nd award		
1st row	Medal of Honor	Bronze Star Medal	Purple Heart with 1 Oak leaf clusters
2nd row	Army Good Conduct Medal with 1 Good Conduct Loop	American Campaign Medal	European–African–Middle Eastern Campaign Medal with 2 Campaign stars
3rd row	World War II Victory Medal	Army of Occupation Medal with 'Germany' Clasp	National Defense Service Medal
4th row	Korean Service Medal with 6 Campaign stars	United Nations Service Medal Korea	Korean War Service Medal

Foreign Awards

Croix De Guerre (France)	War Merit Cross (Italy)

== Civilian life and death ==
Mendoza was born on July 15, 1922, in Miami, Arizona, the eldest of 11 children. He married Alice Gaona in August 1944, two months before he was drafted into the army. They had four children together. After his military service Mendoza worked odd jobs as a handy man, until he became a foreman at the Palo Verde Generating Station. He retired in 1986 due to ill health.

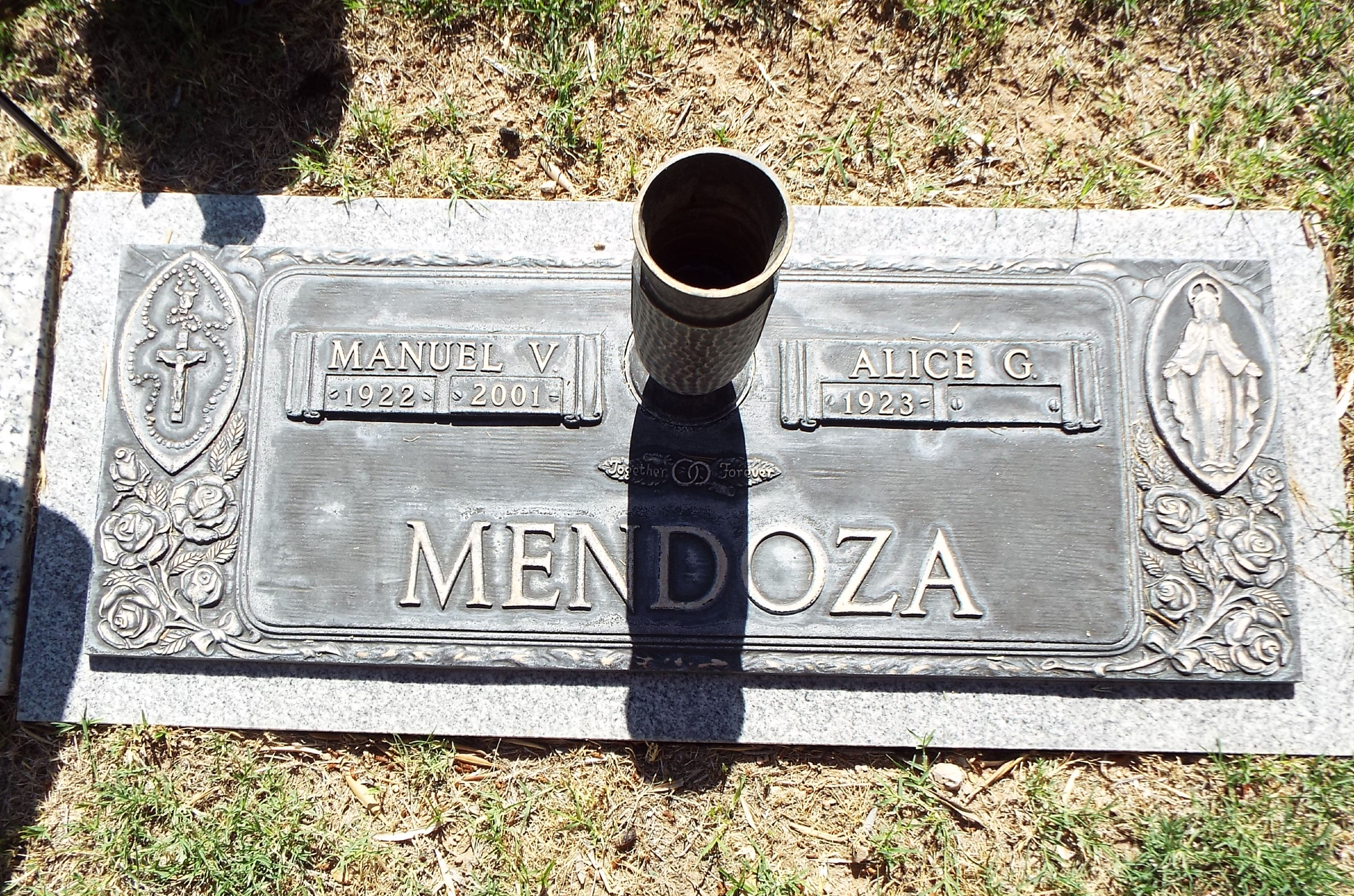
Grave of Mendoza

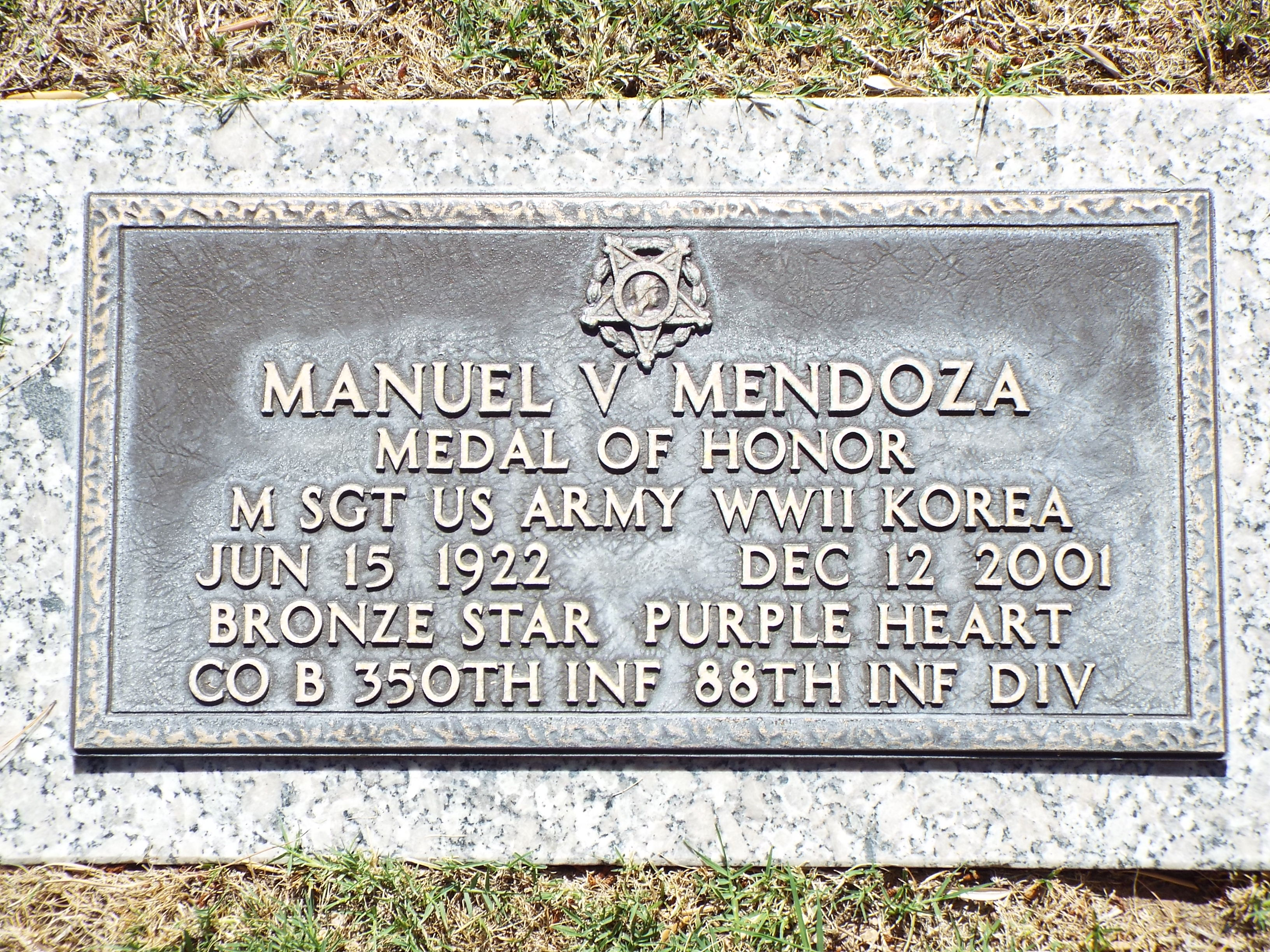
Medal of Honor Plaque

== See also ==
- List of Hispanic Medal of Honor recipients
- List of Medal of Honor recipients
- List of Medal of Honor recipients for World War II
- Hispanic Medal of Honor recipients
- Hispanic Americans in World War II
