= Eurípides Rubio =

United States Army Medal of Honor recipient

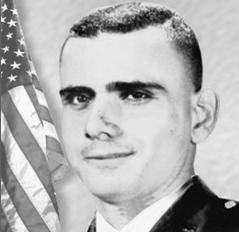
- Capt. Eurípides Rubio
- Born: March 1, 1938; Ponce, Puerto Rico
- Died: November 8, 1966 (aged 28); Tay Ninh Province, Republic of Vietnam
- Burial place: Puerto Rico National Cemetery, Bayamón, Puerto Rico
- Military career
- Allegiance: United States of America
- Branch: United States Army
- Service years: 1956–1966
- Rank: Captain
- Units: HHC, 1ST BN, 28th Infantry, 1st Infantry Division
- Conflicts: Vietnam War: Operation Attleboro †
- Awards: Medal of Honor; Purple Heart

Captain Eurípides Rubio (March 1, 1938 – November 8, 1966) was a United States Army officer and one of nine Puerto Ricans who were posthumously awarded the United States' highest military decoration for valor, the Medal of Honor, for actions on November 8, 1966, during the Vietnam War. Rubio was a member of the United States Army, Headquarters & Headquarters Company, 1st Battalion, 28th Infantry Regiment (Black Lions), 1st Infantry Division.

== Early years ==
Rubio was born in the city of Ponce, Puerto Rico, in the southern region of Puerto Rico. There, he received his primary and secondary education. Rubio was a member of the Civil Air Patrol's Ponce High School Cadet Squadron, Chapter 52012/PR012, Puerto Rico Wing, from 1952 to 1956. After high school, Rubio enrolled at the University of Puerto Rico and the program Army ROTC, Rubio joined the Army as a commissioned second lieutenant officer in the Military Police Corps at Fort Buchanan, Puerto Rico.

== Action in Vietnam ==
On November 8, 1966, during Operation Attleboro in Tay Ninh Province, South Vietnam, Captain Rubio's company came under attack from the North Vietnamese Army; leaving the safety of his post, Rubio received two serious wounds as he braved the intense enemy fire to distribute ammunition, re-establish positions and render aid to the wounded. Despite his pain, he assumed command when a rifle company commander was medically evacuated. He was then wounded a third time as he tried to move amongst his men to encourage them to fight with renewed effort.

While aiding the evacuation of wounded personnel, he noted that a US smoke grenade, which was intended to mark the Viet Cong's position for an air strike, had fallen dangerously close to friendly lines. He ran to move the grenade but was immediately struck to his knees by enemy fire. Despite his wounds, Rubio managed to collect the grenade and again run through enemy fire to within 20 m of the enemy position to throw the by-then already smoking grenade into the enemy before he fell for the final time. Using the now-repositioned grenade as a marker, friendly air strikes were directed to destroy the hostile positions.

Rubio's singularly heroic act turned the tide of the battle, and for his extraordinary leadership and valor, he posthumously received the Medal of Honor in 1968. His remains were buried in Puerto Rico National Cemetery in the city of Bayamón, Puerto Rico.

== Medal of Honor citation ==

RUBIO, EURIPIDES
Rank and organization: Captain, U.S. Army, Headquarters and Headquarters Company, 1st Battalion, 28th Infantry,1st Infantry Division, RVN.
Place and date: Tay Ninh Province, Republic of Vietnam, November 8, 1966.
Entered service at: Fort Buchanan, Puerto Rico.
Born: March 1, 1938, Ponce, Puerto Rico.
Citation:

For conspicuous gallantry and intrepidity in action at the risk of his life above and beyond the call of duty. Capt. Rubio, Infantry, was serving as communications officer, 1st Battalion, when a numerically superior enemy force launched a massive attack against the battalion defense position. Intense enemy machinegun fire raked the area while mortar rounds and rifle grenades exploded within the perimeter. Leaving the relative safety of his post, Capt. Rubio received 2 serious wounds as he braved the withering fire to go to the area of most intense action where he distributed ammunition, re-established positions and rendered aid to the wounded. Disregarding the painful wounds, he unhesitatingly assumed command when a rifle company commander was medically evacuated. Capt. Rubio was wounded a third time as he selflessly exposed himself to the devastating enemy fire to move among his men to encourage them to fight with renewed effort. While aiding the evacuation of wounded personnel, he noted that a smoke grenade which was intended to mark the Viet Cong position for air strikes had fallen dangerously close to the friendly lines. Capt. Rubio ran to reposition the grenade but was immediately struck to his knees by enemy fire. Despite his several wounds, Capt. Rubio scooped up the grenade, ran through the deadly hail of fire to within 20 meters of the enemy position and hurled the already smoking grenade into the midst of the enemy before he fell for the final time. Using the repositioned grenade as a marker, friendly air strikes were directed to destroy the hostile positions. Capt. Rubio's singularly heroic act turned the tide of battle, and his extraordinary leadership and valor were a magnificent inspiration to his men. His remarkable bravery and selfless concern for his men are in keeping with the highest traditions of the military service and reflect great credit on Capt. Rubio and the U.S. Army.

Among the military decorations which Capt. Rubio earned were the following:

Badge	Combat Infantryman Badge		
1st row	Medal of Honor		Purple Heart
2nd row	National Defense Service Medal	Vietnam Service Medal with one bronze service star	Vietnam Campaign Medal
Unit Citations	Army Presidential Unit Citation	Vietnam Gallantry Cross Unit Citation	Vietnam Civil Actions Medal Unit Citation
Badge	Basic Parachutist badge		

Foreign unit decorations

- Fourragère cord

== Honors ==
The United States Army Reserve Center located at the Puerto Nuevo sector of San Juan was named posthumously named Capt. Eurípides Rubio United States Army Reserve Center.

The United States Department of Veterans Affairs Outpatient Clinic in Ponce was named in memory of Captain Eurípides Rubio.

The American Legion Post 142 in San Juan was named after Capt. Euripides Rubio.

Rubio's name is inscribed in "El Monumento de la Recordación" (Monument of Remembrance), dedicated to Puerto Rico's fallen soldiers and situated in front of the Capitol Building in San Juan.

His name is inscribed on the Vietnam Veterans Memorial ("The Wall") on Panel 12E, Row 044.

On November 11, 2008, the Government of Puerto Rico unveiled in the Capitol Rotunda an oil portrait of Captain Euripedes Rubio.

In 2017 Eurípides Rubio was posthumously inducted to the Puerto Rico Veterans Hall of Fame.

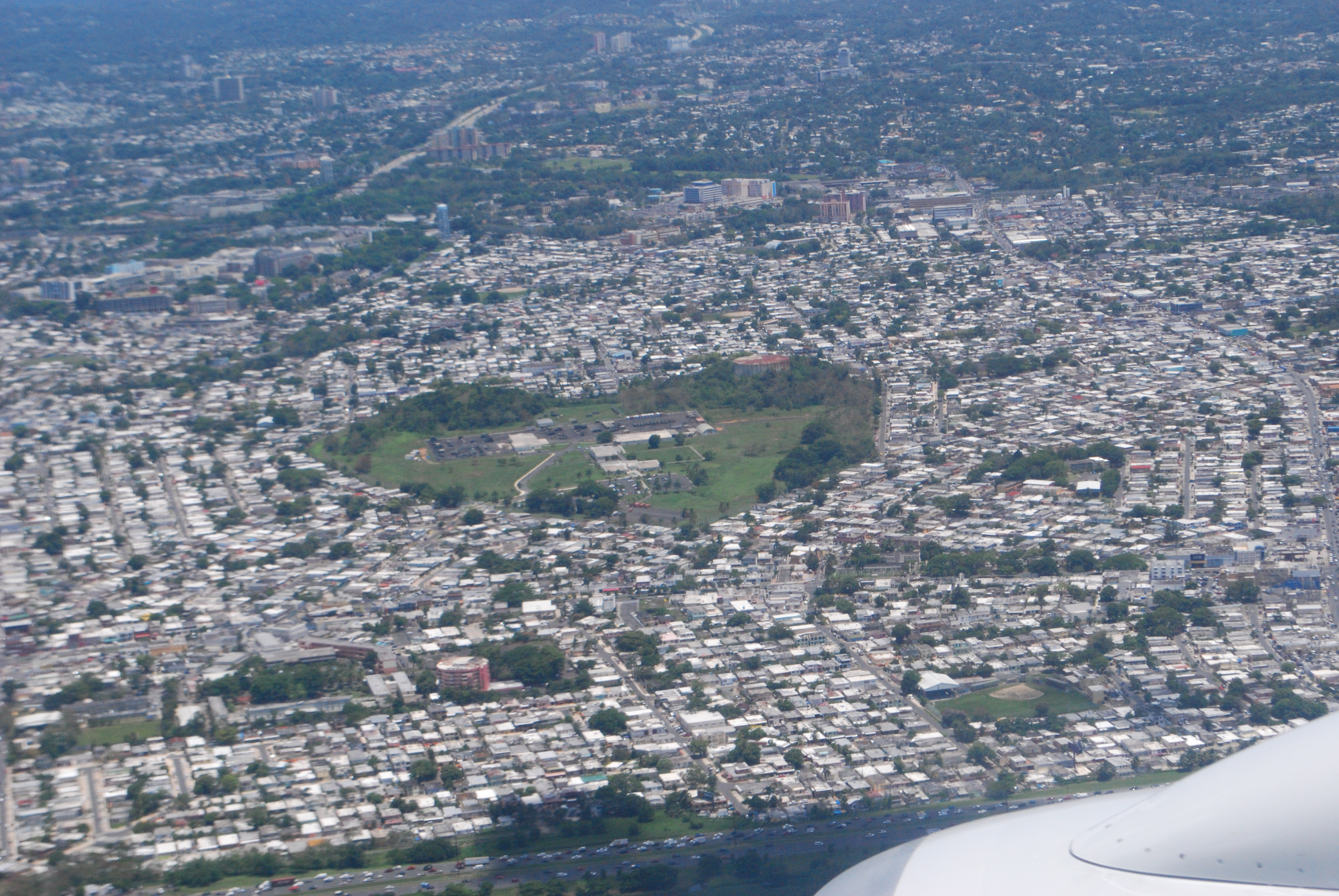
CPT Eurípides Rubio United States Army Reserve Center can be seen in the center green area surrounded by an urban landscape, in barrio Gobernador Piñero (in San Juan).

== See also ==
- List of Puerto Ricans
- List of Puerto Rican military personnel
- Puerto Rican recipients of the Medal of Honor
- List of Hispanic Medal of Honor recipients
- List of Medal of Honor recipients
- List of Medal of Honor recipients for the Vietnam War
