= Félix Conde Falcón =

United States Army Medal of Honor recipient

Félix Modesto Conde Falcón
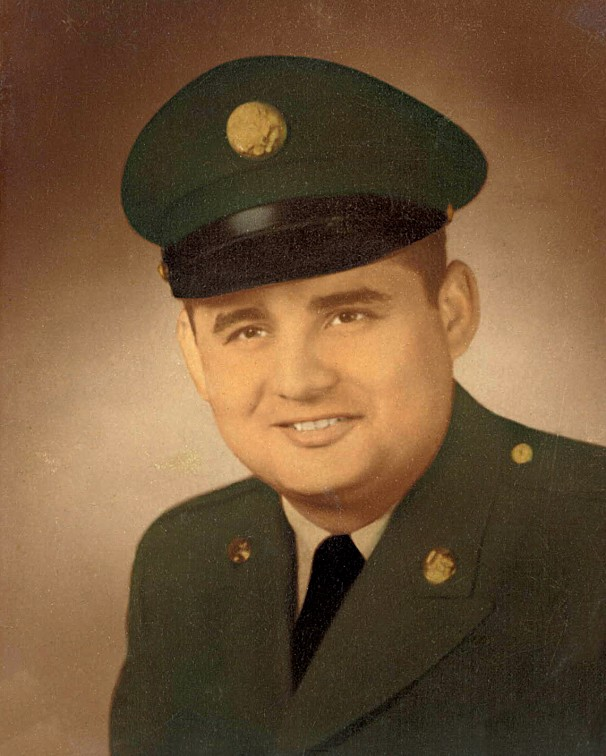
- Picture of Félix Conde Falcón wearing his military uniform
- Born: February 28, 1938; Juncos, Puerto Rico
- Died: April 4, 1969 (aged 31); Ap Tan Hoa, Republic of Vietnam
- Burial place: Rogers Cemetery, Rogers, Texas
- Military career
- Allegiance: United States of America
- Branch: United States Army
- Service years: 1963–1969
- Rank: Staff Sergeant
- Units: Company D, 1st Battalion, 505th Infantry Regiment, 3d Brigade, 82d Airborne Division
- Conflicts: Vietnam War †
- Awards: Medal of Honor; Bronze Star; Purple Heart

Félix Modesto Conde Falcón (February 28, 1938 – April 4, 1969) was a United States Army soldier and a recipient of the Medal of Honor. Conde was killed during combat operations in Ap Tan Hoa, South Vietnam, on April 4, 1969. He was posthumously awarded the Medal of Honor by President Barack Obama at a ceremony in the White House on March 18, 2014. The award comes through the Defense Authorization Act, which called for a review of Jewish American and Hispanic American veterans from World War II, the Korean War, and the Vietnam War to ensure that no prejudice was shown to those deserving the Medal of Honor.

== Early years ==
Félix Modesto Conde was born in Juncos, Puerto Rico, Feb. 24, 1938, and raised in Chicago, Illinois. He volunteered to join the U.S. Army in April 1963.

== Vietnam War ==
He stationed in Texas at Fort Bliss and later at Fort Hood where he was settled with his wife and young family before been deployed to Vietnam. On April 4, 1969, while serving as platoon leader in the vicinity of Ap Tan Hoa, Vietnam, with Company D, 1st Battalion, 505th Infantry, 3rd Brigade, 82nd Airborne Division Conde-Falcon was killed in action that day after destroying multiple enemy bunkers and demonstrating extraordinary leadership under fire.

== Military awards ==
Conde Falcón's military decorations include the following:

Badge	Combat Infantryman Badge		
1st Row	Medal of Honor	Bronze Star Medal with "V" device and one bronze oak leaf cluster	Purple Heart
2nd Row	Army Commendation Medal	Army Good Conduct Medal with two good conduct loops	National Defense Service Medal
3rd Row	Vietnam Service Medal with three service stars	Vietnam Campaign Medal	Vietnam Military Merit Medal
Unit awards	Republic of Vietnam Gallantry Cross Unit Citation	Vietnam Civil Actions Medal	Army Presidential Unit Citation with one bronze oak leaf cluster

=== Badges ===
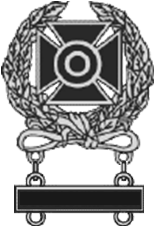
- Expert Rifle Marksmanship Badge
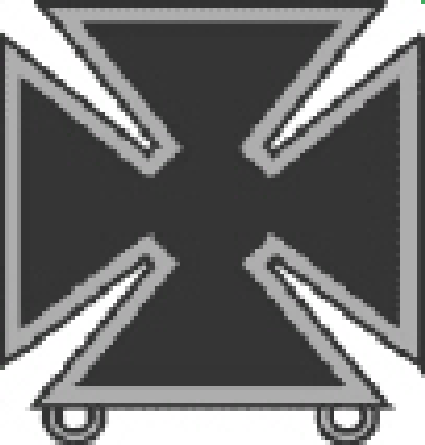
- Marksmanship Badge
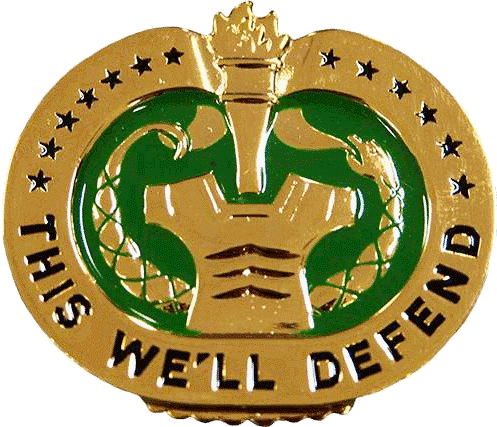
- Drill Sergeant Identification Badge
- 2 Overseas Service Bars
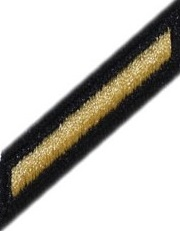
- 2 Service stripes

== Medal of Honor citation ==

The President of the United States of America, authorized by Act of Congress, July 9, 1918 (amended by act of July 25, 1963), takes pride in presenting the Medal of Honor (posthumously) to:

STAFF SERGEANT
FELIX M. CONDE-FALCON
UNITED STATES ARMY

For extraordinary heroism in connection with military operations involving conflict with an armed hostile force in the Republic of Vietnam, while serving with Company D, 1st Battalion, 505th Infantry, 3rd Brigade, 82nd Airborne Division:

Conde-Falcon distinguished himself by exceptionally valorous actions, April 4, 1969, while serving as platoon leader during a sweep operation in the vicinity of Ap Tan Hoa, Vietnam. Entering a heavily wooded section on the route of advance, the company encountered an extensive enemy bunker complex, later identified as a battalion command post. Following tactical artillery and air strikes on the heavily secured communist position, the platoon of Conde-Falcon was selected to assault and clear the bunker fortifications. Moving out ahead of his platoon, he charged the first bunker, heaving grenades as he went. As the hostile fire increased, he crawled to the blind side of an entrenchment position, jumped to the roof, and tossed a lethal grenade into the bunker aperture. Without hesitating, he proceeded to two additional bunkers, both of which he destroyed in the same manner as the first. Rejoined with his platoon, he advanced about one hundred meters through the trees, only to come under intense hostile fire. Selecting three men to accompany him, he maneuvered toward the enemy's flank position. Carrying a machine-gun, he single-handedly assaulted the nearest fortification, killing the enemy inside before running out of ammunition. After returning to the three men with his empty weapon and taking up an M-16 rifle, he concentrated on the next bunker. Within ten meters of his goal, he was shot by an unseen assailant and soon died of his wounds.

His great courage, his ability to act appropriately and decisively in accomplishing his mission, his dedication to the welfare of his men mark him as an outstanding leader Conde-Falcon's extraordinary heroism and devotion to duty, at the cost of his life, were in keeping with the highest traditions of the military service and reflect great credit upon himself, his unit, and the United States Army.

Historic Feats Staff Sergeant Conde-Falcon and his company encountered an extensive enemy bunker complex, later identified as a battalion command post. Following tactical artillery and air strikes on the heavily secured enemy position, Staff Sergeant Conde-Falcon's platoon was selected to assault and clear the bunker fortifications. Moving out ahead of his platoon, Staff Sergeant Conde-Falcon charged the first bunker, heaving grenades as he went. As the hostile fire increased, he crawled to the blind side of an entrenchment position, jumped to the roof, and tossed a grenade into the bunker aperture. Without hesitating, he proceeded to two additional bunkers, both of which he destroyed in the same manner as the first. Rejoining his platoon, Staff Sergeant Conde-Falcon advanced about one hundred meters through the trees before coming under intense hostile fire. Selecting three men to accompany him, he maneuvered toward the enemy's flank position. Carrying a machinegun, he single-handedly assaulted the nearest fortification, killing the enemy inside before running out of ammunition. After returning to the three men with his empty weapon and taking up an M-16 rifle, he concentrated on the next bunker. Within ten meters of his goal, Staff Sergeant Conde-Falcon was shot by an unseen assailant and soon died of his wounds.

== See also ==
- List of Puerto Ricans
- List of Puerto Rican military personnel
- List of Puerto Rican recipients of the Medal of Honor
- List of Hispanic Medal of Honor recipients
- List of Medal of Honor recipients for the Vietnam War
- Puerto Ricans in the Vietnam War
