= Carlos Lozada (soldier) =

US Army Medal of Honor recipient (1946–1967)

Carlos James Lozada
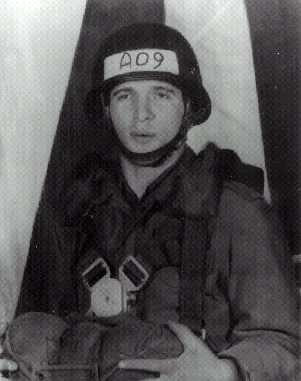
- Born: September 6, 1946; Caguas, Puerto Rico
- Died: November 20, 1967 (aged 21); Dak To, South Vietnam
- Burial place: Long Island National Cemetery
- Military career
- Branch: United States Army
- Service years: 1966–1967
- Rank: Private First Class
- Units: Co. A, 2nd Battalion, 503 Infantry, 173d Airborne Brigade
- Conflicts: Vietnam War: Battle of Dak To †
- Awards: Medal of Honor; Purple Heart

Carlos James Lozada (September 6, 1946 – November 20, 1967) was a member of the United States Army who was one of five Puerto Ricans who received the Medal of Honor during the Vietnam War.

== Early years ==
Lozada was born in Caguas, Puerto Rico. He graduated from high school in 1966 and soon married. Lozada then joined the United States Army.

== Vietnam War ==
The United States at that time was involved in the Vietnam War and on June 11, 1967, Lozada was sent to Vietnam and assigned to Co. A, 2nd Battalion, 503 Infantry, 173rd Airborne Brigade.

Lozada's unit was heavily engaged during the Battle of Dak To. On November 20, 1967, PFC Lozada spotted a North Vietnamese Army company rapidly approaching his outpost. He alerted his comrades and opened fire with a machine gun, killing at least twenty of the enemy soldiers and disrupting their initial attack. He realized that if he abandoned his position there would be nothing to hold back the surging North Vietnamese soldiers and his entire company withdrawal would be jeopardized – as a result he told his comrades to move to the back and that he would supply cover for them. He continued to deliver a heavy and accurate volume of suppressive fire against the enemy until he was mortally wounded and had to be carried during the withdrawal.

Lozada was posthumously awarded the Medal of Honor in December 1969.

== Medal of Honor citation ==

The President of the United States in the name of The Congress takes pleasure in presenting the Medal of Honor to:
LOZADA, CARLOS JAMES
Rank and organization:Private First Class, U.S. Army, Company A, 2d Battalion, 503d Infantry, 173d Airborne Brigade.
Place and date: Dak To, Republic of Vietnam, November 20, 1967.
Entered service at: New York, N.Y.
Born: September 6, 1946, Caguas, Puerto Rico.
Citation:

For conspicuous gallantry and intrepidity in action at the risk of his life above and beyond the call of duty. Pfc. Lozada, U.S. Army, distinguished himself at the risk of his life above and beyond the call of duty in the battle of Dak To. While serving as a machine gunner with 1st platoon, Company A, Pfc. Lozada was part of a 4-man early warning outpost, located 35 meters from his company's lines. At 1400 hours a North Vietnamese Army company rapidly approached the outpost along a well-defined trail. Pfc. Lozada alerted his comrades and commenced firing at the enemy who were within 10 meters of the outpost. His heavy and accurate machinegun fire killed at least 20 North Vietnamese soldiers and completely disrupted their initial attack. Pfc. Lozada remained in an exposed position and continued to pour deadly fire upon the enemy despite the urgent pleas of his comrades to withdraw. The enemy continued their assault, attempting to envelop the outpost. At the same time enemy forces launched a heavy attack on the forward west flank of Company A with the intent to cut them off from their battalion. Company A was given the order to withdraw. Pfc. Lozada apparently realized that if he abandoned his position there would be nothing to hold back the surging North Vietnamese soldiers and that the entire company withdrawal would be jeopardized. He called for his comrades to move back and that he would stay and provide cover for them. He made this decision realizing that the enemy was converging on 3 sides of his position and only meters away, and a delay in withdrawal meant almost certain death. Pfc. Lozada continued to deliver a heavy, accurate volume of suppressive fire against the enemy until he was mortally wounded and had to be carried during the withdrawal. His heroic deed served as an example and an inspiration to his comrades throughout the ensuing 4-day battle. Pfc. Lozada's actions are in the highest traditions of the U.S. Army and reflect great credit upon himself, his unit, and the U.S. Army.

Badge	Combat Infantryman Badge		
1st Row	Medal of Honor	Purple Heart	Army Good Conduct Medal
2nd Row	National Defense Service Medal	Vietnam Service Medal with one bronze service star	Vietnam Campaign Medal
Badge	Parachutist Badge		
Unit awards	Army Presidential Unit Citation		Valorous Unit Award

== Honors ==
- He was buried with full military honors at Long Island National Cemetery in Farmingdale, NY, in Section T, Site 2295.
- The Bronx honored him by naming a playground in his honor located behind 175 Willis Ave.
- A fitness center at Fort Campbell was named in his honor.
- On 11 November 2008, the Government of Puerto Rico unveiled in the Capitol Rotunda the oil portrait of PFC Carlos James Lozada.

== See also ==
- List of Puerto Ricans
- List of Puerto Rican military personnel
- Puerto Rican recipients of the Medal of Honor
- List of Hispanic Medal of Honor recipients
- List of Medal of Honor recipients for the Vietnam War
