= Fernando Luis García =

Marine Corps Medal of Honor recipient

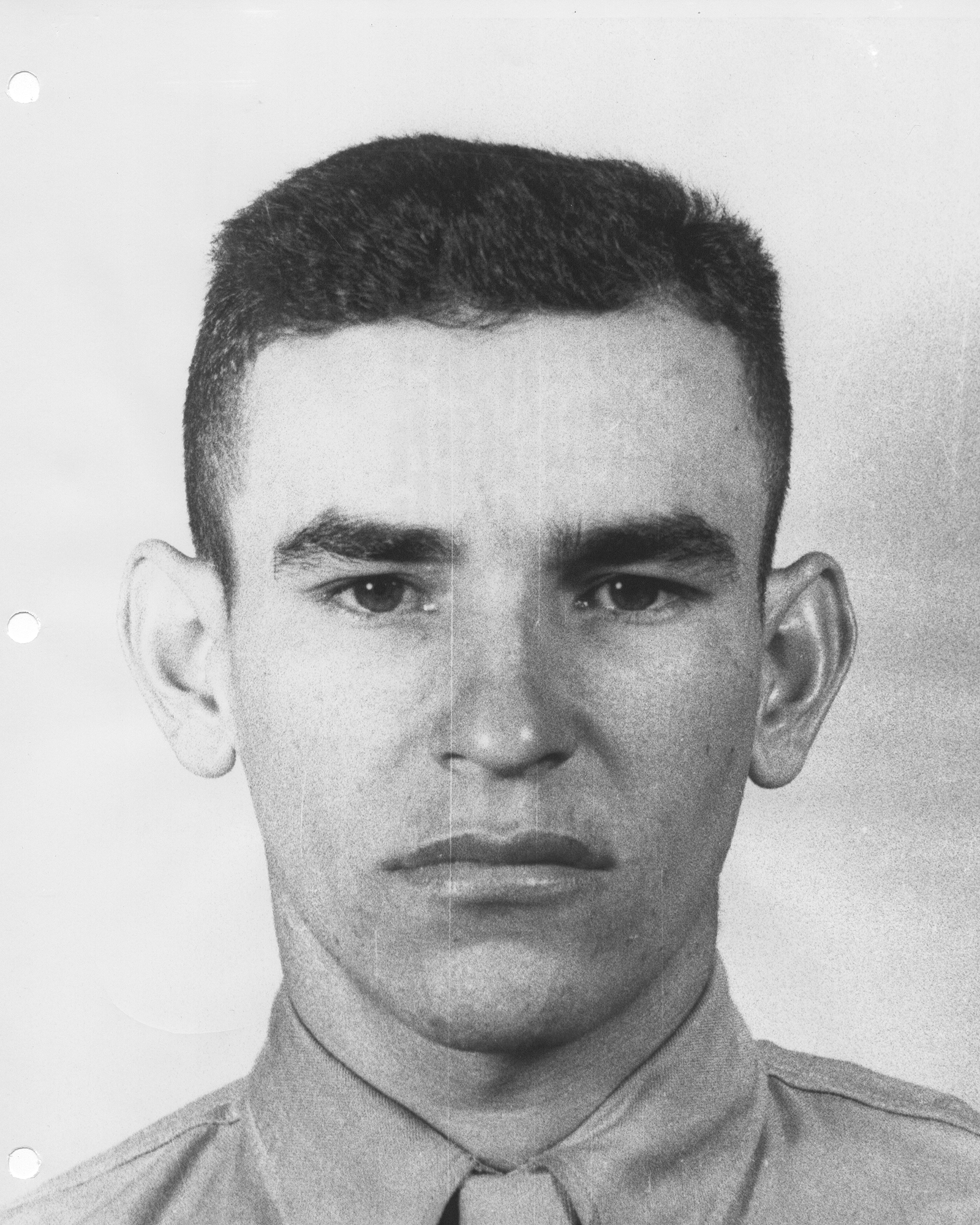
- Born: Fernando Luis García Ledesma; October 14, 1929; Utuado, Puerto Rico
- Died: September 5, 1952 (aged 22) near Panmunjom, Korea
- Burial place: Puerto Rico National Cemetery
- Military career
- Allegiance: United States
- Branch: United States Marine Corps
- Service years: 1951–1952
- Rank: Private first class
- Units: Company I, 3rd Battalion, 5th Marines, 1st Marine Division
- Conflicts: Korean War: Battle of Bunker Hill †
- Awards: Medal of Honor; Purple Heart Medal

Fernando Luis García (October 14, 1929 – September 5, 1952) was a United States Marine Corps private first class who was killed in action during the Korean War and posthumously awarded the Medal of Honor for heroism above and beyond the call of duty on September 5, 1952, during the Battle of Bunker Hill. He was the first of nine Puerto Rican servicemen to be awarded the Medal of Honor and is the only Puerto Rican Marine to be awarded the medal.

== Early life ==
García (birth name: Fernando Luis García Ledesma) was born in Utuado, Puerto Rico where he received his primary and secondary education. He moved to San Juan where he was hired by the Texas Company as a file clerk.

== U.S. Marine Corps ==
On September 19, 1951, García joined the United States Marines Corps and received his recruit training at Parris Island, South Carolina. After he graduated from "boot camp", he was promoted to private first class in December and was sent to Camp Lejeune, North Carolina for more training before being sent to Korea in March 1952.

García was a member of Company I, 3rd Battalion, 5th Marines, 1st Marine Division. On the night of his death, he and his company were posted about 1 mile (1.6 km) from the enemy lines at "Outpost Bruce" in the Bunker Hill area. Chinese soldiers were attacking with artillery, mortars, and grenades. García was wounded and getting hand grenades from his acting platoon sergeant when an enemy grenade landed near them. García covered the grenade with his body, sacrificing himself to save the life of his fellow Marine who was wounded by the blast. García died instantly. For this heroic action, he was posthumously awarded the Medal of Honor.

García's remains were never recovered.

== Medal of Honor citation ==
On October 25, 1953, García's parents were presented his Medal of Honor at a ceremony held in the Utuado City Hall.

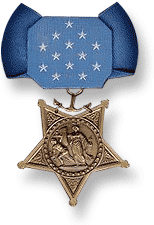

The President of the United States in the name of U.S. Congress takes pride in presenting the MEDAL OF HONOR posthumously to:
PRIVATE FIRST CLASS FERNANDO L. GARCIA
UNITED STATES MARINE CORPS

For conspicuous gallantry and intrepidity at the risk of his life above and beyond the call of duty while serving as a member of Company I, Third Battalion, Fifth Marines, First Marine Division (Reinforced), in action against enemy aggressor forces in Korea on September 5, 1952. While participating in the defense of a combat outpost located more than one mile forward of the main line of resistance during a savage night attack by a fanatical enemy force employing grenades, mortars and artillery, Private First Class Garcia, although suffering painful wounds, moved through the intense hail of hostile fire to a supply point to secure more hand grenades. Quick to act when a hostile grenade landed nearby, endangering the life of another Marine, as well as his own, he unhesitatingly chose to sacrifice himself and immediately threw his body upon the deadly missile, receiving the full impact of the explosion. His great personal valor and cool decision in the face of almost certain death sustain and enhance the finest traditions of the United States Naval Service. He gallantly gave his life for his country.

== Awards and decorations ==

1st row	Medal of Honor	Purple Heart	Combat Action Ribbon Retroactively Awarded, 1999
2nd row	Navy Unit Commendation	National Defense Service Medal	Korean Service Medal with 2 Campaign stars
3rd row	Korean Presidential Unit Citation	United Nations Service Medal Korea	Korean War Service Medal Retroactively Awarded, 2003

== Honors ==
El Monumento de la Recordación

- On February 5, 1959, the United States Marines Corps named a military camp in Vieques, Puerto Rico, "Camp García" in his honor.
- The United States Navy named the García class of ships in his honor, with the lead ship in the class (USS Garcia) bearing his name, as well.
- His name is inscribed in "El Monumento de la Recordación" (Monument of Remembrance), dedicated to Puerto Rico's fallen soldiers and situated in front of the Capitol Building in San Juan, Puerto Rico.
- His name is also inscribed in the "Wall of the Missing" located in the National Memorial of the Pacific in Honolulu, Hawaii, which honors the Medal of Honor recipients whose bodies have never been recovered.
- A monument commemorating his actions stands in his hometown of Utuado, Puerto Rico.
- On November 11, 2008, the Government of Puerto Rico unveiled in the Capitol Rotunda the oil portrait of PFC Fernando Luis García.
- The American Legion Post 42 in Utuado, Puerto Rico was named American Legion Auxiliary, 42 Pfc Fernando Luis Garcia and a low income housing project, the Caserío Fernando Luis García in Utuado, is also named after García.
- In 2017 Fernando Luis Garcia was posthumously inducted to the Puerto Rico Veterans Hall of Fame.

== See also ==
- List of Puerto Rican military personnel
- List of Korean War Medal of Honor recipients
- Puerto Rican recipients of the Medal of Honor
- Hispanics in the United States Marine Corps
