= Diversity, equity, and inclusion policies of the second Trump administration =

During the early days of the second presidency of Donald Trump, federal policies regarding diversity, equity, and inclusion (DEI), in addition to sometimes accessibility (DEIA), have undergone significant change. Trump attributed societal problems to diversity, equity, and inclusion and wokeness. Equating diversity with incompetence, he reversed pro-diversity policies in the federal government, and downsized divisions working on civil rights. He reoriented remaining civil rights divisions to target state and local officials, companies, and colleges for "illegal DEI", which became a buzzword in his administration. His administration launched worldwide investigations into companies, cities, and institutions for alleged "DEI" programs. The moves came following his 2024 presidential campaign which stated it would reinterpret existing Civil Rights-era protections for minorities to counter "anti-white racism". Trump promised to roll back Biden-era Executive Orders on diversity and racial equity, saying there was a "definite anti-white feeling in the country".

In response to anti-DEI executive actions and against what the administration called "improper ideology", numerous agencies and websites altered or removed material related to women, racial minorities, and transgender individuals.

== Public statements ==
At a press conference held in January 2025, the day after a mid-air collision between an airplane and helicopter that killed 67 people, the worst aviation accident in the U.S. since 2001, Trump read from a January 2024 New York Post article that falsely said "the FAA is actively recruiting workers who suffer severe intellectual disabilities, psychiatric problems and other mental and physical conditions under a diversity and inclusion hiring initiative spelled out on the agency's website."

== Department of Defense ==
The changes were apparently in compliance with an executive order by President Donald Trump abolishing diversity, equity, inclusion, and accessibility programs.

For approximately 20 years prior to Trump's order, the U.S. military had perceived "DEI" as strategically valuable, as it supported other personnel recruitment and retention programs. North Carolina history professor Wayne Lee told NPR that profiles of Black officers awarded the Medal of Honor or Indigenous individuals who used tribal languages for secure communications were intended to connect with potential new recruits "who see them as their ancestors and who want to emulate their service...History is a strategic tool in the DOD toolbox, and at the moment they're breaking it."

The department released a statement in January 2025 that celebration of "identity months" was prohibited. Guidance released in February stated, "By March 5, 2025, all Components must remove and archive DoD news articles, photos, and videos promoting DEI, including content related to critical race theory, gender ideology, and identity-based programs."

On March 19, the Defense Department told ABC News that "some" pages may have been "mistakenly" removed due to the search terms used for the DEI scrubbing process and would be restored. The content removals may have been the result of an artificial intelligence system that was human-prompted to seek out and remove content associated with "DEI initiatives."

== Government purge ==
On January 20-21, 2025, Trump signed several executive orders targeting DEI efforts:

1. Executive Order 14148, "Initial Rescissions of Harmful Executive Orders and Actions"
2. Executive Order 14151, "Ending Radical and Wasteful Government DEI Programs and Preferencing"
3. Executive Order 14168, "Defending Women from Gender Ideology Extremism and Restoring Biological Truth to the Federal Government"
4. Executive Order 14173, "Ending Illegal Discrimination and Restoring Merit-Based Opportunity", rescinding the 1965 Executive Order 11246

The orders demanded that all governmental DEI programs be shut down by January 23, and placed employees on administrative leave and eventual layoff.

An internal Department of Government Efficiency (DOGE) report obtained by the Washington Post outlined a three-phase process by which DOGE would lead a purge of diversity, equity, and inclusion (DEI) from the federal government:

- In phase one, which took place on January 20, 2025, all DEI related executive orders and initiatives would be rescinded, offices at various federal organizations that served a DEI role would be dissolved, and their employees terminated, federal websites would remove all DEI-related material from their websites, and DEI-related contracts would be terminated.
- In phase two, which lasted from January 21 to February 19, the government would begin purging employees that did not work in a DEI-related role, but who had taken part in DEI in some way that made them "corrupted". On February 5, Axios reported that DOGE representatives were searching through the databases of the National Oceanic and Atmospheric Administration (NOAA) to find employees associated with DEI initiatives.
- In phase three, scheduled for February 20 to July 19, the DOGE begins to commit mass-scale firings of any employee in any office or part of the federal government which did not take part in any DEI offices or initiatives, but who were nonetheless determined through unknown criteria to be "DEI-related".

In February 2025 it was reported that the Foreign Service Institute of the U.S. State Department "suspended access to thousands of pages of training materials" related to DEI, and the Internal Revenue Service "deleted any mention of the words 'diversity', 'equity' and 'inclusion' from its procedural handbook, including from anodyne passages on taxes and finance." It was also reported that career civil servants in the United States Department of Agriculture who had previously worked to implement policies intended to reduce racial, sexual-orientation, and gender-identity discrimination were "placed on leave and faced potential firing." It was also reported that the acting director of the Office of Personnel Management (OPM) told the heads of agencies that any staff members working on DEI programs before November 5, 2024 (election day) should be targeted for termination, and the OPM encouraged workers to "report colleagues who were continuing to do DEIA-related work."

Women, people of color, and LGBTQ individuals have been scrubbed from federal websites, image archives, and physical installations:

- The National Park Service removed mentions of transgender individuals from its website on the Stonewall riots, changed "LGBT" to "LGB", and removed the word "queer".
- The National Cryptologic Museum papered over portraits of women and racial minorities in their Hall of Honor, including those of Elizebeth Friedman, Washington Wong, and Ralph W. Adams Jr. The portraits were restored after news of the actions began circulating online.
- Pictures that celebrated women in science were removed from NASA buildings.
- The Air Force removed videos of the Tuskegee Airmen and Women Airforce Service Pilots.
- The Defense Intelligence Agency paused its observances of several holidays and commemoratory months, including Martin Luther King Jr. Day, Pride Month, and Holocaust Days of Remembrance.
- In March 2025, over 26,000 images were slated to be purged from military websites, including those of decorated veterans and the Enola Gay, which was erroneously flagged because its name contains the word "gay".
- A web page about Charles Calvin Rogers, a Black Medal of Honor recipient of the Vietnam War, was briefly deleted and had "medal" replaced with "deimedal" in its URL.
- An article about Jackie Robinson's experience in the military was similarly deleted and had "dei" added to its URL before being restored.

=== Department of Defense ===
Content removed by the Department of Defense included:

- The U.S. Air Force deleted a biography of the first woman in United States Air Force Thunderbirds demonstration squadron, retired colonel Nicole Malachowski.
- The U.S. Marine Corps deleted an article about the first Black Marine, technical sergeant Alfred Masters, who joined the service in 1942 for the Pacific War (1941–45).
- The Department of Defense deleted a profile of the first-ever black Medal of Honor recipient, Sergeant William Carney of the 54th Massachusetts Colored Infantry, as prohibited DEI content.
- 14 of the 18 articles on government websites about the military service of American baseball star Jackie Robinson were deleted from U.S. government websites. Robinson was drafted in 1942, court-martialed in 1944 for refusing to go to the back of the bus, acquitted, and honorably discharged later the same year. The new URL of one of the articles is tagged "DEI". Press Secretary Ullyot later said, "Everyone at the Defense Department loves Jackie Robinson." A profile of Robinson was restored on March 19.
- A profile of Medal of Honor recipient Charles C. Rogers was deleted, with a portion of the URL changed from "medal" to "deimedal"; the changes were reversed two days later and the Trump administration said that the changes were an error resulting from an "auto removal process".
- A photograph of Medal of Honor recipient Harold Gonsalves was removed.
- A page about the highly decorated 442nd Infantry Regiment, a segregated Japanese-American unit, was removed. Following a statement of concern by Hawaii Congressman Ed Case, the page was restored on March 14. According to the Japanese-American internment archive and history group Denshō, the regiment is now labeled a "key military unit" and any mention of the race or place of origin of its soldiers and officers has been removed. Denshō executive director Naomi Ostwald Kawamura noted in a statement, "The irony of this revisionist approach is that the 442nd Regimental Combat Team only existed because of race...the government recognized that a Japanese American unit could counter Axis propaganda about U.S. racism and provide a strategic tool for American war efforts by demonstrating America's supposed racial tolerance to the rest of the world. This means that the racial framing of the 442nd is not an incidental part of the story, it is the story. Removing explicit references to race and identity erases the very conditions that led to the unit's formation."
- Content about indigenous code talkers was deleted. Code talkers, including Navajo code talkers enlisted in the U.S. Marine Corps in World War II, used their native languages to securely transmit messages during multiple wars. Code Talkers content was incompletely restored by March 20 following a public outcry. Navajo Nation president Buu Nygren reported that "White House officials informed the Navajo Nation that an artificial intelligence-powered automated review process looking for content with DEI initiatives led to the elimination of anything mentioning Navajo." Pages that mention National American Indian Heritage Month remain unavailable.
- A profile of a 173rd Sky Soldiers paratrooper of Navajo heritage was deleted.
- A profile of Brigadier General Doug Lowrey that mentioned his ancestors' survival of the Cherokee removal was deleted.
- A history of indigenous women fighting in wars throughout American history was deleted. The article described personnel including an Oneida woman Tyonajanegen who fought with her husband at the 1777 Battle of Oriskany in New York; Charlotte Edith Anderson Monture, a Mohawk from Ontario, Canada, who served in the U.S. Army Nurse Corps during World War I; Marge Pascale, a woman of Ojibwe heritage who served with WAAC during World War II, and Ola Mildred Rexroat, a woman of Oglala-Lakota heritage who was a WASP and an air-traffic controller in the U.S. Air Force after the war; Minnie Spotted-Wolf, who was the first female Native American U.S. Marine; female Eskimo Scouts who served with the Alaska National Guard in the 1980s; and Hopi woman and Army specialist Lori Piestewa, who was killed in Iraq in 2003 and is the namesake of Piestewa Peak, a mountain near Phoenix, Arizona.
- A news release about a guardsman from South Dakota Army National Guard's 235th Military Police Company receiving a dress-protocol exemption based on his Oglala Sioux heritage was deleted.
- A profile of Medgar Evers, a veteran of World War II and an assassinated leader of the American civil rights movement, was deleted from the Arlington National Cemetery website.
- Arlington removed links to three modules from the Notable Graves menu of their website (African American History, Hispanic American History, Women's History), links to five modules from Education Themes sections (Civil War, Environment, Medal of Honor, Service Branches, Women's History), and links to two modules on the History of Arlington National Cemetery (Freedman's Village, Section 27).
- A profile of Ira Hayes, an enrolled member of the Gila River Indian Community who was among those raising the American flag at Iwo Jima, was deleted.
- Content about the Tuskegee Airmen was deleted.
- Content about the bomber plane that carried the first nuclear weapons used in war, the Enola Gay, was deleted, apparently because the word "Gay" was interpreted to mean homosexual rather than as a woman's given name.
- Content about female fighter pilots was deleted.
- Pages on Colin Powell, the first African American chairman of the Joint Chiefs of Staff, were deleted.
- A section of Arlington National Cemetery's website on notable graves of Hispanic Americans, including Jose Hector Santa Ana, a great-great-nephew of Mexican General Antonio López de Santa Anna, was removed.
- An article about actress Bea Arthur's time in the Marines during World War II was removed.
- Articles related to the Holocaust were removed, including one about a cadet's experience visiting concentration camps, an article about survivor Kitty Saks, and a page that commemorated Holocaust Remembrance Week.
- Pages about Lisa Jaster, the first female Army Reserve graduate of Ranger School, and Jeannie Leavitt, the first female fighter pilot, were removed. An article about the Women Airforce Service Pilots was also removed.
- Pages sharing details about Saleha Jabeen, the first Muslim woman chaplain in the United States Air Force, and Khady Ndiaye, the first Muslim woman chaplain candidate in the United States Army, were deleted and replaced with 404 notices.
- Approximately 400 books were removed from the U.S. Naval Academy library due to purported DEI content. The New York Times has contrasted some of the texts that were removed versus retained: Mein Kampf (retained) versus Memorializing the Holocaust (removed), The Bell Curve (retained) versus a book critiquing it (removed).
- Secretary of Defense Pete Hegseth ordered John Phelan, the Secretary of the Navy, to rename the US naval ship Harvey Milk, which was named after Harvey Milk, a gay rights icon and former naval officer. Hegseth reportedly chose to order the renaming during Pride Month on purpose.

The purge resulted in the accidental deletion of various unrelated data, such as references to the Enola Gay and operational data held on NSA servers.

=== Reactions ===
According to two veteran Republican budget experts, the first phase of DOGE's plan "appears driven more by an ideological assault on federal agencies long hated by conservatives than a good-faith effort to save taxpayer dollars".

According to Brenda Sue Fulton, "[this] administration has hung a sign outside the armed forces saying if you're not a white male, you are no longer welcome."

Some experts have suggested that some efforts to protect diversity, equity and inclusion "will continue - but in a different guise, one more suited to the political mood of a country that has just elected a president who has pledged a war on 'woke'".

Early February 2025, a lawsuit was filed against Trump's executive orders, arguing that they were unconstitutional. In March, the United States Court of Appeals for the Fourth Circuit paused the lower court's nationwide preliminary injunction and permitted the enforcement of the executive orders pending the outcome of the appeal.

In June 2025, Reagan-appointed Judge William G. Young declared Trump's reasoning in cutting "DEI" and "gender ideology extremism" programs for the National Institutes of Health "void and illegal", stating that claims of fighting DEI were "appalling" and "palpably clear" racial discrimination, and that "I've never seen a record where racial discrimination was so palpable. I've sat on this bench now for 40 years. I've never seen government racial discrimination like this".

Roy Campbell, an auxiliary bishop of the Roman Catholic Archdiocese of Washington, wrote in a reflection published September 2025, stated "“This administration wants to erase Diversity, Equity, and Inclusion from the American conscience ... However, just think about the letters, DEI. DEI, Dei means God in Latin.”

In December 2025, ProPublica reported that after the signing of EO 14151, more than 1000 nonprofits rewrote the mission statements in their tax filings to remove references to DEI efforts.

== Actions ==
The administration has:

- Cut funding for about 1,200 grants focused on heart disease, HIV/AIDS, Alzheimer’s disease, alcohol and substance abuse and mental health issues
- Cut funding to programs for students with hearing and vision loss
- Cut funding to research grants for students who are first-generation, poor, have been in foster care, have a disability or are from a rural area
- Cut research into health disparities
- Put roughly $18 billion in funding for New York City infrastructure projects on hold
- Reduced certain words
- Scaled back enforcement of fair housing
- Shut Defense Department Advisory Committee on Women in the Services and according to a tweet, ended the Women Peace and Security program
- Targeted hundreds of grants that focused on the health of Black communities, women and LGBTQ people
- Threatened to cut funding to public schools

== See also ==
- 2025 United States government online resource removals
