= U.S. Department of Defense censorship of DEI-connected material =

2025 whitewashing of U.S. military history

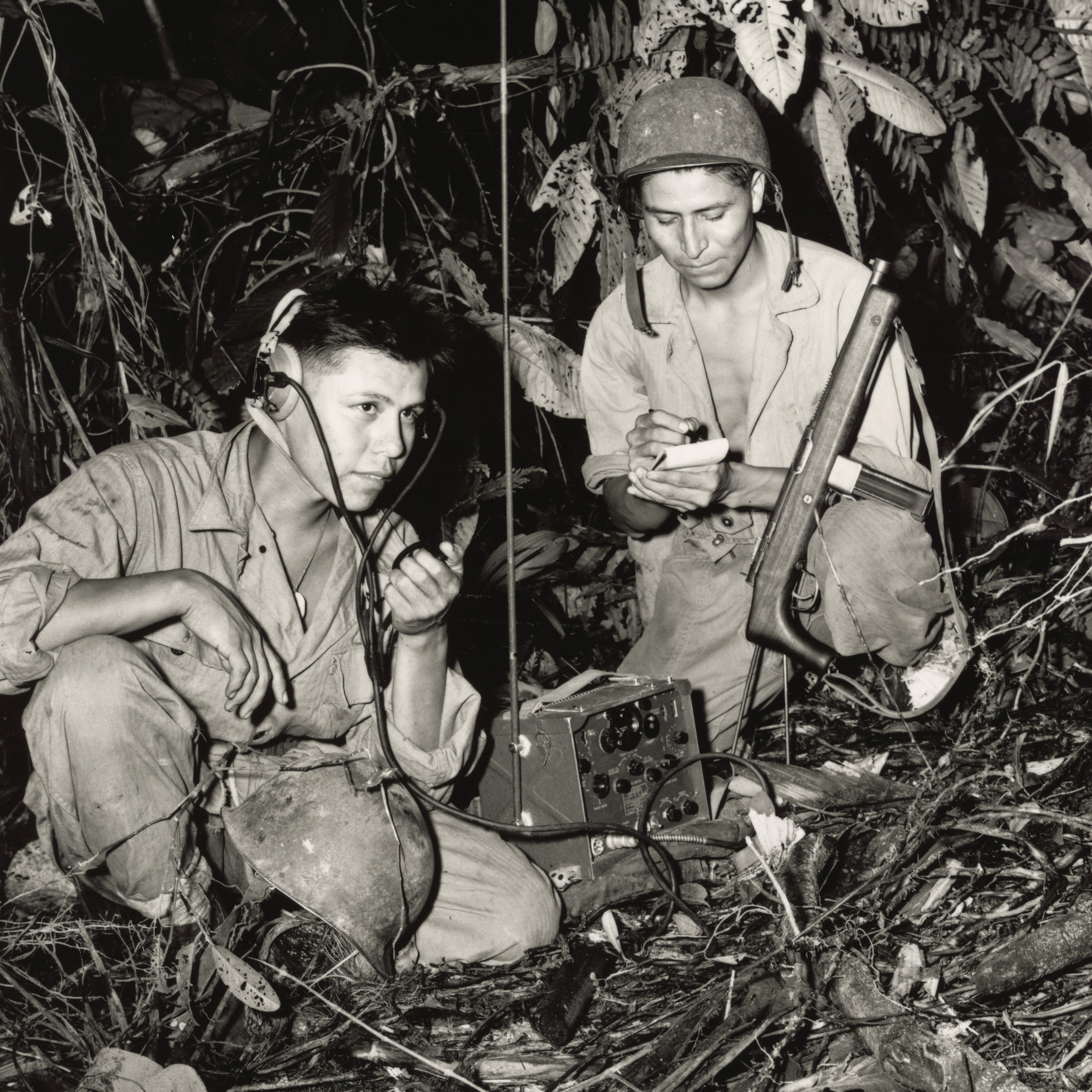
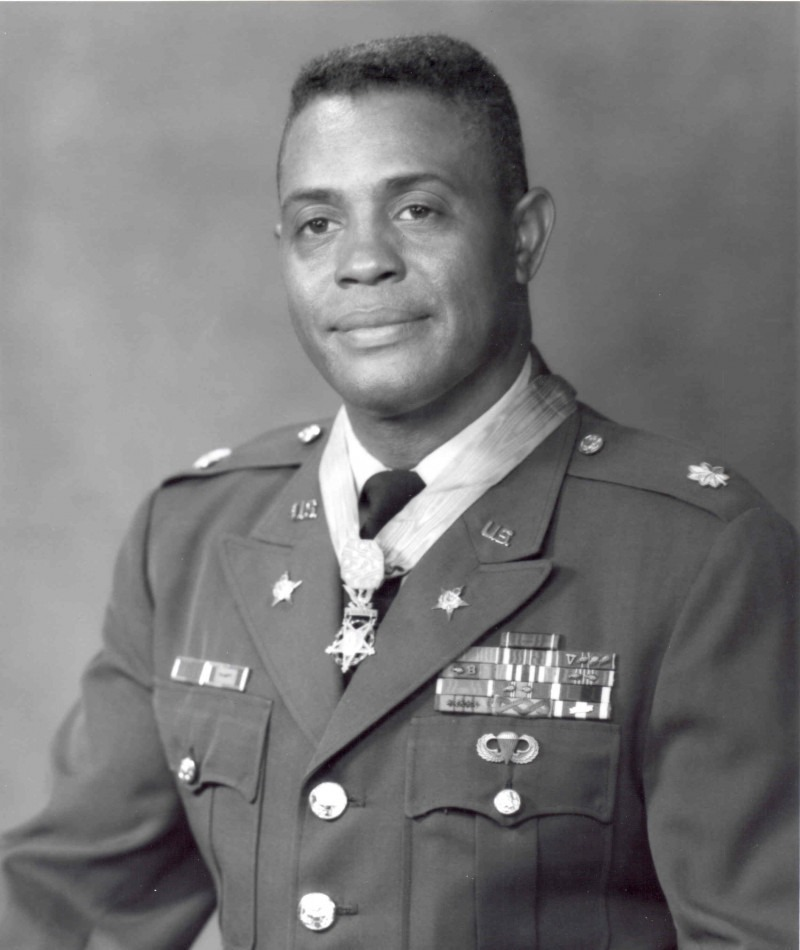
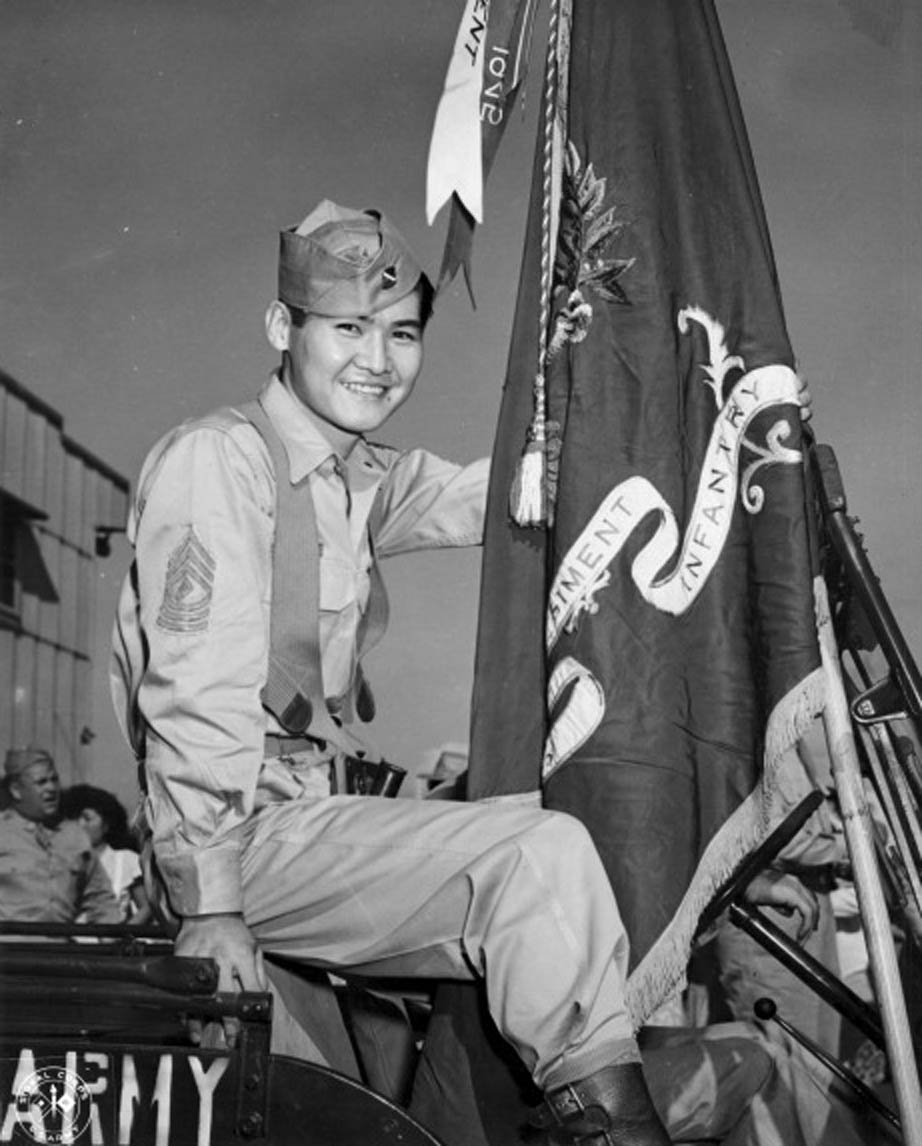
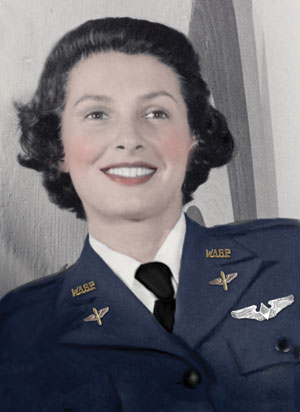
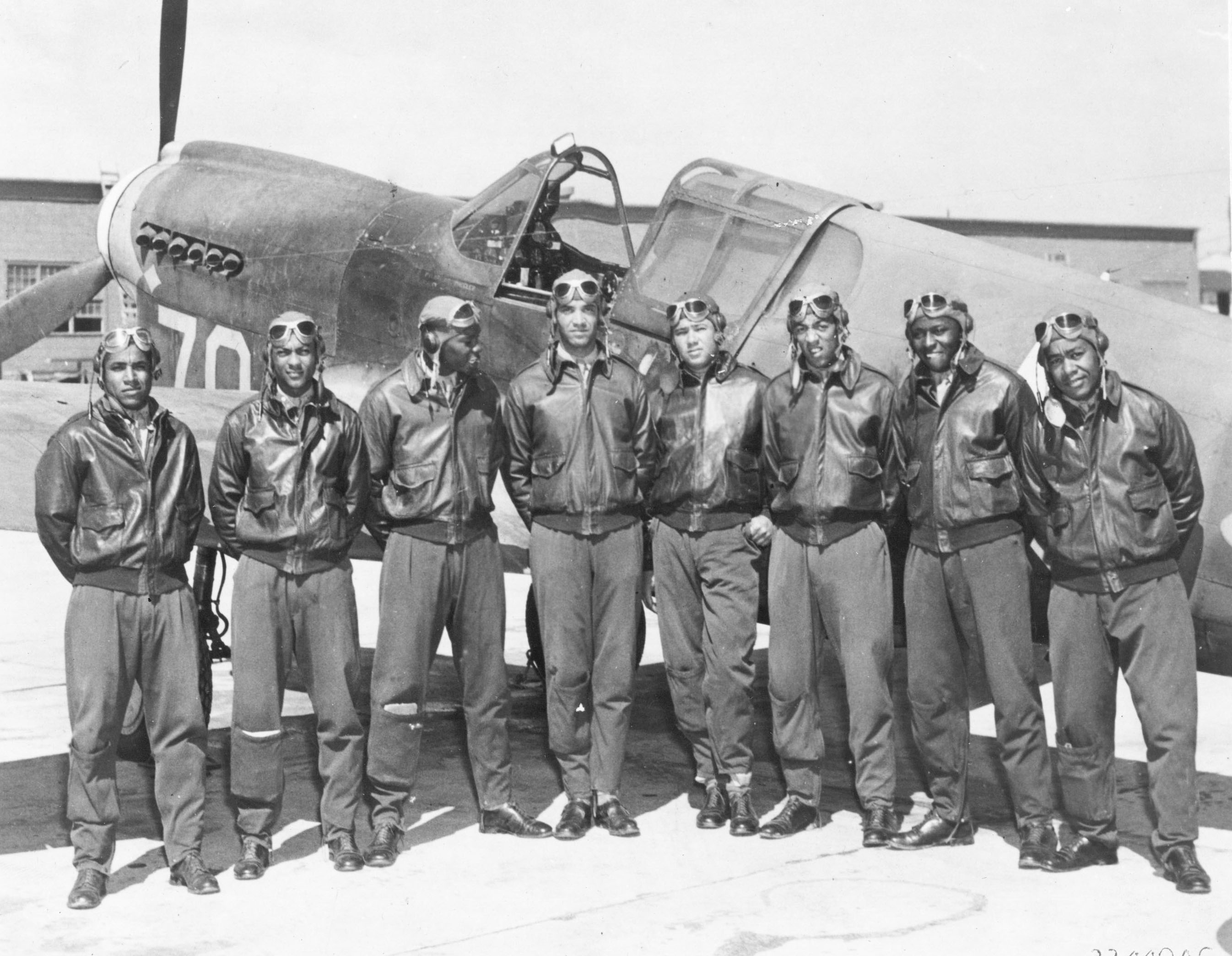
Top to bottom, left to right: Information about the 54th Massachusetts Regiment at Fort Wagner during the American Civil War; Navajo code talkers; Charles C. Rogers, the highest-ranking black officer to be awarded the Medal of Honor; a history of the segregated and highly decorated Japanese-American 442nd Regimental Combat Team; Indigenous women like Ola Mildred Rexroat who have served in the U.S. armed services; and the Tuskegee Airmen were among articles deleted under a Trump administration censorship order

The U.S. Department of Defense's censorship of DEI-connected material was done in compliance with an executive order by President Donald Trump during his second term of office. The United States Department of Defense (DOD) deleted content purportedly tied to Diversity, Equity, and Inclusion (DEI) initiatives. The texts purged from the Pentagon website included the achievements of historically underrepresented groups, such as Navajo code talkers, Tuskegee Airmen, medal of honor recipients, and women veterans.

== Orders ==
The changes were apparently in compliance with an executive order by President Donald Trump abolishing diversity, equity, inclusion, and accessibility programs.

For approximately 20 years prior to Trump's order, the U.S. military had perceived "DEI" as strategically valuable, as it supported other personnel recruitment and retention programs. North Carolina history professor Wayne Lee told NPR that profiles of Black officers awarded the Medal of Honor or Indigenous individuals who used tribal languages for secure communications were intended to connect with potential new recruits "who see them as their ancestors and who want to emulate their service...History is a strategic tool in the DOD toolbox, and at the moment they're breaking it."

The department released a statement in January 2025 that celebration of "identity months" was prohibited. Guidance released in February stated, "By March 5, 2025, all Components must remove and archive DoD news articles, photos, and videos promoting DEI, including content related to critical race theory, gender ideology, and identity-based programs."

On March 19, the Defense Department told ABC News that "some" pages may have been "mistakenly" removed due to the search terms used for the DEI scrubbing process and would be restored. The content removals may have been the result of an artificial intelligence system that was human-prompted to seek out and remove content associated with "DEI initiatives."

== Response ==
Pentagon press secretary John Ullyot also told ABC that DEI is "a form of Woke cultural Marxism... as Secretary Hegseth has said, DEI is dead at the Defense Department." Ullyot also stated that DEI should be considered to mean "Discriminatory Equity Ideology". On March 21 the Washington Post reported that Ullyot had been sidelined as a spokesperson for the Defense Department. In response to inquiries about the content removals, Pentagon press secretary Sean Parnell stated that "anybody that says in the Department of Defense that diversity is our strength is, is frankly, incorrect." Parnell also argued that during Joe Biden's administration the department had a "zealous and destructive commitment to DEI."

American historian Heather Cox Richardson has argued that the "erasure of Indigenous, Black, Hispanic, and female veterans from our military history is an attempt to elevate white men as the sole actors in our history."

== Affected materials ==
Content removed by the Department of Defense included:

- The U.S. Air Force deleted a biography of the first woman in United States Air Force Thunderbirds demonstration squadron, retired colonel Nicole Malachowski.
- The U.S. Marine Corps deleted an article about the first Black Marine, technical sergeant Alfred Masters, who joined the service in 1942 for the Pacific War (1941–45).
- The Department of Defense deleted a profile of the first-ever black Medal of Honor recipient, Sergeant William Carney of the 54th Massachusetts Colored Infantry, as prohibited DEI content.
- 14 of the 18 articles on government websites about the military service of American baseball star Jackie Robinson were deleted from U.S. government websites. Robinson was drafted in 1942, court-martialed in 1944 for refusing to go to the back of the bus, acquitted, and honorably discharged later the same year. The new URL of one of the articles is tagged "DEI". Press Secretary Ullyot later said, "Everyone at the Defense Department loves Jackie Robinson." A profile of Robinson was restored on March 19.
- A profile of Medal of Honor recipient Charles C. Rogers was deleted, with a portion of the URL changed from "medal" to "deimedal"; the changes were reversed two days later and the Trump administration said that the changes were an error resulting from an "auto removal process".
- A photograph of Medal of Honor recipient Harold Gonsalves was removed.
- A page about the highly decorated 442nd Infantry Regiment, a segregated Japanese-American unit, was removed. Following a statement of concern by Hawaii Congressman Ed Case, the page was restored on March 14. According to the Japanese-American internment archive and history group Denshō, the regiment is now labeled a "key military unit" and any mention of the race or place of origin of its soldiers and officers has been removed. Denshō executive director Naomi Ostwald Kawamura noted in a statement, "The irony of this revisionist approach is that the 442nd Regimental Combat Team only existed because of race...the government recognized that a Japanese American unit could counter Axis propaganda about U.S. racism and provide a strategic tool for American war efforts by demonstrating America's supposed racial tolerance to the rest of the world. This means that the racial framing of the 442nd is not an incidental part of the story, it is the story. Removing explicit references to race and identity erases the very conditions that led to the unit's formation."
- Content about indigenous code talkers was deleted. Code talkers, including Navajo code talkers enlisted in the U.S. Marine Corps in World War II, used their native languages to securely transmit messages during multiple wars. Code Talkers content was incompletely restored by March 20 following a public outcry. Navajo Nation president Buu Nygren reported that "White House officials informed the Navajo Nation that an artificial intelligence-powered automated review process looking for content with DEI initiatives led to the elimination of anything mentioning Navajo." Pages that mention National American Indian Heritage Month remain unavailable.
- A profile of a 173rd Sky Soldiers paratrooper of Navajo heritage was deleted.
- A profile of Brigadier General Doug Lowrey that mentioned his ancestors' survival of the Cherokee removal was deleted.
- A history of indigenous women fighting in wars throughout American history was deleted. The article described personnel including an Oneida woman Tyonajanegen who fought with her husband at the 1777 Battle of Oriskany in New York; Charlotte Edith Anderson Monture, a Mohawk from Ontario, Canada, who served in the U.S. Army Nurse Corps during World War I; Marge Pascale, a woman of Ojibwe heritage who served with WAAC during World War II, and Ola Mildred Rexroat, a woman of Oglala-Lakota heritage who was a WASP and an air-traffic controller in the U.S. Air Force after the war; Minnie Spotted-Wolf, who was the first female Native American U.S. Marine; female Eskimo Scouts who served with the Alaska National Guard in the 1980s; and Hopi woman and Army specialist Lori Piestewa, who was killed in Iraq in 2003 and is the namesake of Piestewa Peak, a mountain near Phoenix, Arizona.
- A news release about a guardsman from South Dakota Army National Guard's 235th Military Police Company receiving a dress-protocol exemption based on his Oglala Sioux heritage was deleted.
- A profile of Medgar Evers, a veteran of World War II and an assassinated leader of the American civil rights movement, was deleted from the Arlington National Cemetery website.
- Arlington removed links to three modules from the Notable Graves menu of their website (African American History, Hispanic American History, Women's History), links to five modules from Education Themes sections (Civil War, Environment, Medal of Honor, Service Branches, Women's History), and links to two modules on the History of Arlington National Cemetery (Freedman's Village, Section 27).
- A profile of Ira Hayes, an enrolled member of the Gila River Indian Community who was among those raising the American flag at Iwo Jima, was deleted.
- Content about the Tuskegee Airmen was deleted.
- Content about the bomber plane that carried the first nuclear weapons used in war, the Enola Gay, was deleted, apparently because the word "Gay" was interpreted to mean homosexual rather than as a woman's given name.
- Content about female fighter pilots was deleted.
- Pages on Colin Powell, the first African American chairman of the Joint Chiefs of Staff, were deleted.
- A section of Arlington National Cemetery's website on notable graves of Hispanic Americans, including Jose Hector Santa Ana, a great-great-nephew of Mexican General Antonio López de Santa Anna, was removed.
- An article about actress Bea Arthur's time in the Marines during World War II was removed.
- Articles related to the Holocaust were removed, including one about a cadet's experience visiting concentration camps, an article about survivor Kitty Saks, and a page that commemorated Holocaust Remembrance Week.
- Pages about Lisa Jaster, the first female Army Reserve graduate of Ranger School, and Jeannie Leavitt, the first female fighter pilot, were removed. An article about the Women Airforce Service Pilots was also removed.
- Pages sharing details about Saleha Jabeen, the first Muslim woman chaplain in the United States Air Force, and Khady Ndiaye, the first Muslim woman chaplain candidate in the United States Army, were deleted and replaced with 404 notices.
- Approximately 400 books were removed from the U.S. Naval Academy library due to purported DEI content. The New York Times has contrasted some of the texts that were removed versus retained: Mein Kampf (retained) versus Memorializing the Holocaust (removed), The Bell Curve (retained) versus a book critiquing it (removed).
- Secretary of Defense Pete Hegseth ordered John Phelan, the Secretary of the Navy, to rename the US naval ship Harvey Milk, which was named after Harvey Milk, a gay rights icon and former naval officer. Hegseth reportedly chose to order the renaming during Pride Month on purpose.

== See also ==
- 2025 United States government online resource removals
- Diversity, equity, and inclusion policies of the second Trump administration
- Military history of African Americans
- Military history of Asian Americans
- Military history of Native Americans
- Military history of Jewish Americans
- Racism against African Americans in the U.S. military
- American Indian Wars
- Women in the United States Armed Forces
- Category:Hispanic and Latino American military personnel
- Category:Military history of the United States
- Territorial evolution of the United States
- U.S. imperialism
- List of Medal of Honor recipients
