= Abuhena Saifulislam =

United States Marine

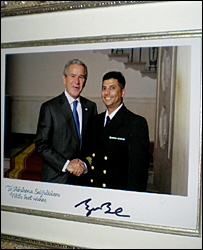
Chaplain Saifulislam shaking hands with President Bush

Commander Abuhena Saifulislam (in U.S. records) or Abu Hena Saiful Islam, (Bengali: আবু হেনা সাইফুল ইসলাম), (born 1963) is a Bangladeshi-American who is the first Muslim naval officer appointed as an imam chaplain serving with units in the Marine Corps.

== Early life ==
Born in 1963, Abu Hena traveled to the US in 1989 for higher studies. He studied at the Southern New Hampshire University and received his MBA degree in 1992. That same year he joined the US Navy. Earlier he had applied for immigration to America by participating in the DV Lottery. He was granted US citizenship towards the end of 1995 while he was working in the U.S. Navy in the payroll and accounting department.

== Career ==
After obtaining citizenship, Saifulislam launched his drive to become an imam in the United States Navy Chaplain Corps, which provides chaplains to the United States Navy and Marine Corps. Saiful attended a course for chaplains serving with the Marine Corps, organized jointly by the Defense Department and the Graduate School of Islamic and Social Sciences in Leesburg, Virginia. He studied for two years to complete the course. In 1998, he took the opportunity of the process of recruiting Navy chaplains and was commissioned in the same rank in 1999. After commissioning, the Navy assigned him to the United States Marine Corps as the first Muslim chaplain to serve with the United States Marine Corps. In this position his main task is to teach about Islam so that an understanding of the religion is built up across the US military. On his appointment as a Muslim chaplain, Saiful said, "When I found out that they were looking for Muslim chaplains, I wanted to become one. I was already involved in religious activities inside the Pentagon (Defense Department headquarters), establishing Friday services and other such things." In the Navy his rank is Commander and he is known as Chaplain Saif.

As of 2014, Chaplain Saifulislam remains the only Muslim chaplain assigned to a Marine Corps unit, and one of only two in the Navy Chaplain Corps.

== See also ==
- Muslims in the United States military
- Abdul-Rasheed Muhammad, first serving chaplain imam in the United States Army and Department of Defense history
- Saleha Jabeen, Indian-born United States Air Force chaplain and first female Muslim imam in United States military history
