= Abdul-Rasheed Muhammad =

First Muslim chaplain in the history of the United States military

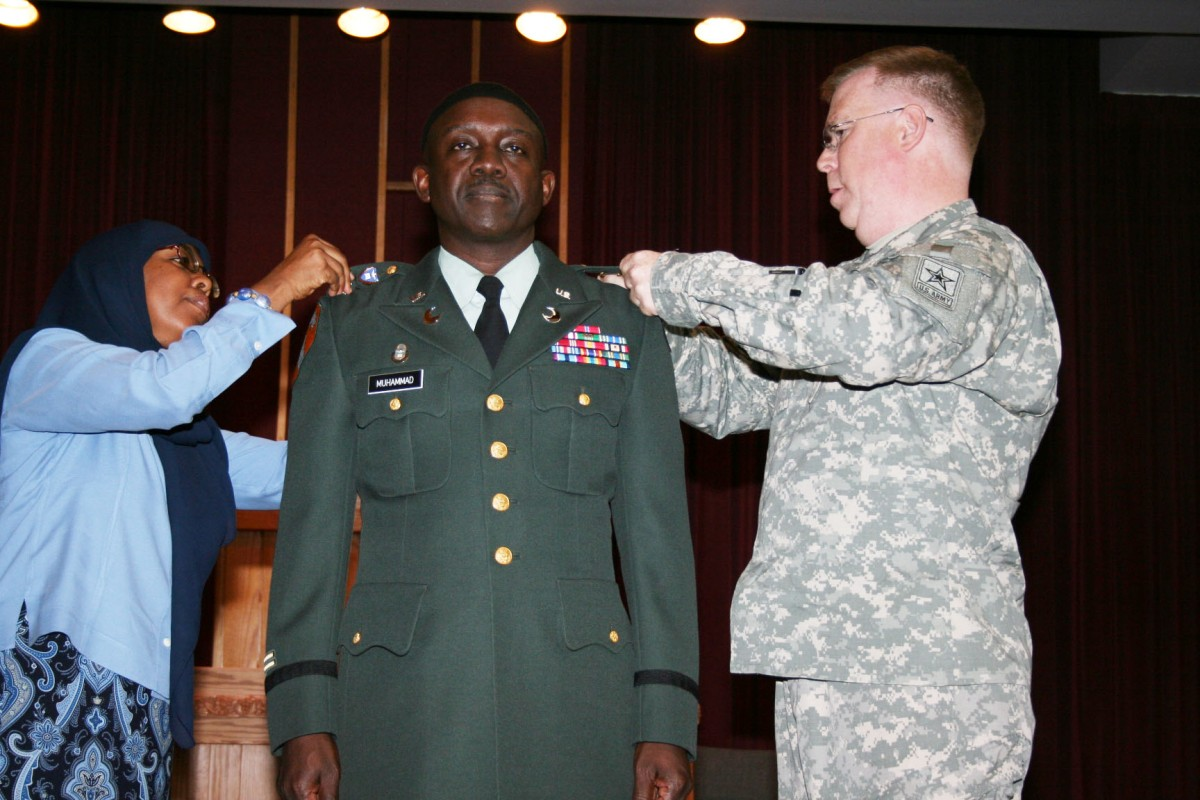
- Muhammad being promoted to lieutenant colonel in 2009
- Born: 1953 (age 72–73)
- Occupations: African-American imam, retired United States Army officer
- Known for: the first Muslim chaplain in the history of the United States armed forces

Abdul-Rasheed Muhammad (born c. 1953) is an African-American imam and retired United States Army officer. In 1994, he became the first Muslim chaplain in the history of the United States armed forces. After the September 11 attacks, he took part in a service at the Pentagon and administered to first responders working the scene of the attack. Today he is an imam in San Diego, California.

== Biography ==
Abdul-Rasheed Muhammad grew up in Buffalo, New York, with a Methodist and Baptist upbringing. As a young man, he was inspired by Malcom X and Muhammad Ali, which encouraged Muhammad to learn more about Islam. He became a Muslim in 1973 as an undergraduate student.

In 1978, Muhammad became an imam and earned a master's degree in social work from the University of Michigan. Muhammad later earned a master's in counseling from San Diego State University. Before enlisting in the United States Army, he worked as a chaplain for the New York Department of Corrections. In 1982, Muhammad served a three-year enlistment in the United States Army. When he enlisted, he sought to become an assistant chaplain, but had a crisis of conscience when he learned he would have to handle wine during chaplain assistant school. Knowing that it would be haram to do so, Muhammad informed his superiors that it would be against his religion to participate in the chaplain assistant training. He would later work in mental health during his initial time in the service.

=== Army chaplaincy ===
In 1993 at age 40, Muhammad returned to the United States Army and applied as a Chaplain candidate. The military had spent the previous decade working with representatives of the American Islamic community to create a pathway for increasing numbers of Muslim converts in the military to have access to chaplaincy support. On December 3, 1993, Muhammad was sworn in as a chaplain candidate at the Pentagon.

At the time, Army chaplain Col. Herman Keizer Jr. said of Muhammad's appointment, "this is the first non-Judeo-Christian faith group to have representation". In April 1994, Muhammad successfully finished his candidacy and became the first chaplain in the United States Army. He would go on to be stationed at Fort Bragg, North Carolina. That year, he made his first Hajj pilgrimage to Mecca. In 1996, Monje Malak Abd Al-Muta Ali ibn Noel, Jr. followed in Muhammad's footsteps becoming the first Imam chaplain in the United States Navy.

In the early years of Muhammad's chaplaincy, he described the supportive nature of his colleagues in the military for his service. He said,

“Before 9/11, Islam was just this religion that was more and more associated or affiliated with Buddhism and Hinduism than anything else..I would imagine that there’s much more sensitivity today to these things than there were when I first came in...Islam — and Muslims, to a very large degree — was looked at as the enemy,” Muhammad said. “The good news is that many of the commanders and officials ... made sure that we didn’t have problems.”

=== Later career ===
In 2001 Muhammad made his second Hajj to Mecca. After the September 11 attacks on the Pentagon, Muhammad was asked to lead Islamic prayers at the Pentagon in the weeks following the attacks. At the time, he was serving as chaplain at Walter Reed National Military Medical Center. He spent several weeks attending to first responders after the attacks and was part of a formal memorial service at the Pentagon led by President Bush, the Joint Chiefs of Staff and members of the United States cabinet.

In 2005, he was serving as a Major in the 1st Cavalry Division at Fort Hood, Texas. While serving with the 1st Cavalry Division, Muhammad spent 18 months deployed in Iraq, where he worked to support his division and established a mosque in Taji. Muhammad additionally served deployments to Afghanistan.

In 2009 while serving at the U.S. Army Chaplain Center and School, Abdul-Rasheed Muhammad was promoted to lieutenant colonel.

=== Retirement ===
In 2012 after 23 years of service, Muhammad retired from the United States Army. After retirement, Muhammad became the imam at Masjidul Taqwa in San Diego. Muhammad counsels veterans at the Veterans Affairs Medical Center in La Jolla, California.

== See also ==
- Muslims in the United States military
- Abuhena Saifulislam, first Muslim imam in the United States Marines
