= List of Portuguese-American Medal of Honor recipients =

The Medal of Honor was introduced during the American Civil War and is the highest military decoration presented by the United States government to a member of its armed forces. The recipient must have distinguished themselves at the risk of their own life above and beyond the call of duty in action against an enemy of the United States. Due to the nature of this medal, it is commonly presented posthumously.

== World War II ==
This with the * indicates that the Medal of Honor was awarded posthumously

Image	Name	Rank	Branch	Unit	Place of action	Date of action	Notes/Reference
	Harold Gonsalves*	Private first class	Marine Corps	4th Battalion, 15th Marines; 6th Marine Division	Ryūkyū Chain, Okinawa	April 15, 1945	Sacrificed his life to smother a grenade with his body
	George J. Peters*	Private	Army	507th Parachute Infantry Regiment, 17th Airborne Division	Wesel, Germany	March 24, 1945	Single-handedly attacked a German machine gun emplacement

== Korean War ==
This with the * indicates that the Medal of Honor was awarded posthumously

Image	Name	Rank	Branch	Unit	Place of action	Date of action	Notes/Reference
	Leroy A. Mendonca*	Sergeant	United States Army	7th Infantry Regiment, 3rd Infantry Division	near Chich-on, Korea	July 4, 1951	Voluntarily remained in an exposed position and covered the platoon's withdrawal

== See also ==
- List of Portuguese Americans
- List of Hispanic Medal of Honor recipients
