= Charles Calvin Rogers =

United States Army general (1929–1990)

Charles C. Rogers
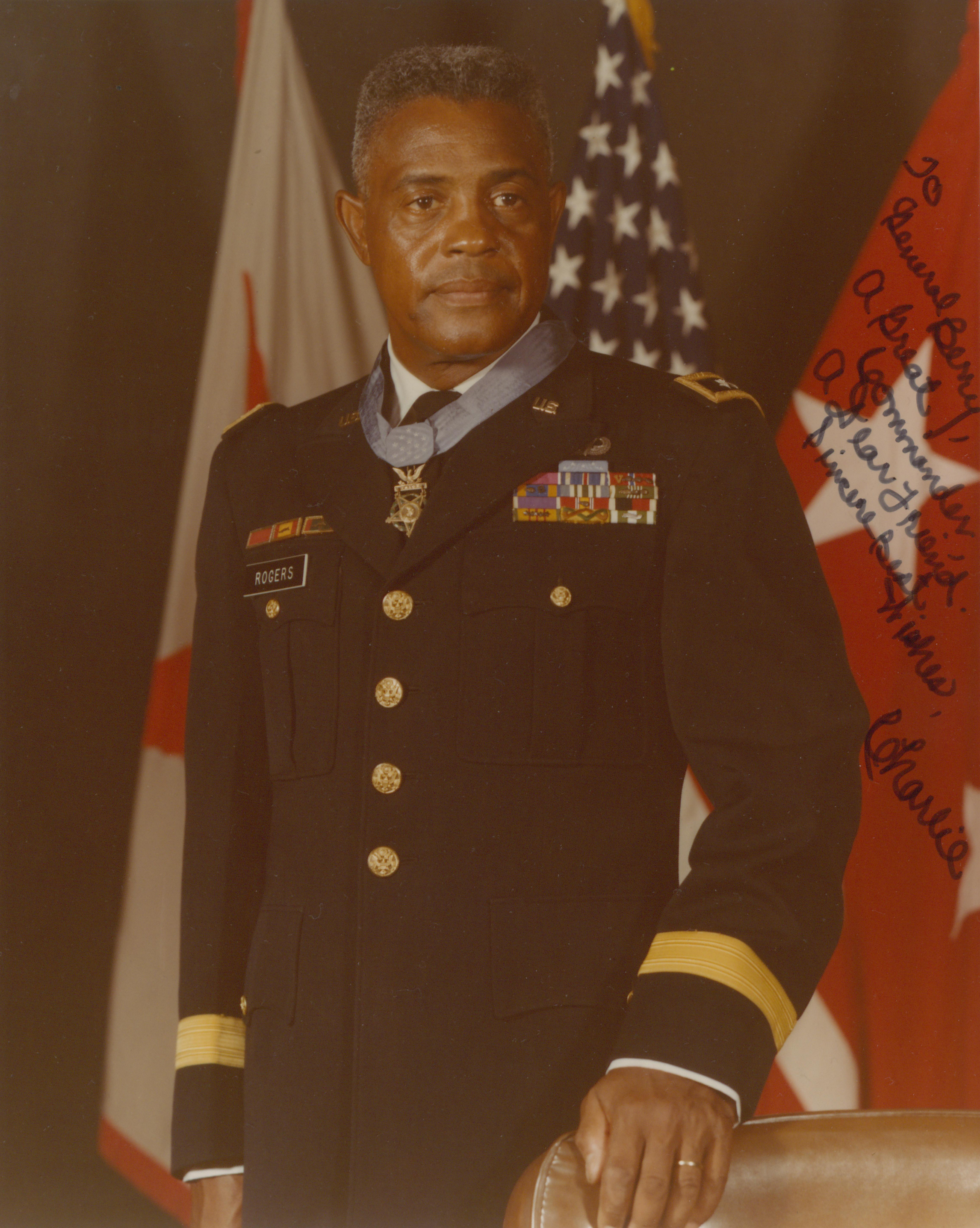
- Rogers with Medal of Honor c. 1978
- Born: September 6, 1929; Claremont, West Virginia, US
- Died: September 21, 1990 (aged 61); Munich, West Germany
- Burial place: Arlington National Cemetery
- Military career
- Allegiance: United States
- Branch: United States Army
- Service years: 1952–1984
- Rank: Major general
- Commands: 1st Battalion, 5th Field Artillery Regiment
- Conflicts: Vietnam War
- Awards: Medal of Honor; Legion of Merit; Distinguished Flying Cross; Bronze Star (4) with V Device; Purple Heart; Air Medal (10); Army Commendation Medal (4); Parachutist Badge
- Other work: Baptist minister

Charles Calvin Rogers (September 6, 1929 – September 21, 1990) was a recipient of the highest military decoration in the United States, the Medal of Honor, for his actions during the Vietnam War. A lieutenant colonel at the time, he became the highest-ranking Black soldier in the U.S. military to receive this honor. A career officer who entered the service as a second lieutenant commissioned by ROTC when the military was still racially segregated, he retired after 32 years in the United States Army with the rank of major general.

== Biography ==
Charles Rogers was born in West Virginia to Clyde L. Rogers, a native of Fire Creek, West Virginia, and his wife, Helen Ford. Rogers' mother had an eighth-grade education; Rogers' father had a ninth-grade education, and had served as an Army enlisted mail clerk during World War I. As a civilian Clyde Rogers worked as a coal loader in a mine. The Rogers family lived in the coal-camp town of Claremont, along the New River in Fayette County, West Virginia. Rogers was the youngest of at least five siblings, three girls and two boys. He attended the town's race-segregated elementary school for "colored children," and then attended the all-black DuBois High School in Mount Hope, West Virginia. At DuBois he was elected student body president and captain of the football team. He also participated in the drama club and was consistently on the academic honor roll. After high school graduation in 1947, he enrolled in West Virginia State College in Institute, West Virginia, a historically black college or university (HBCU), and graduated with a B.S. in mathematics. Rogers became a member of Omega Psi Phi fraternity in 1948.

In 1951, he joined the US Army as a second lieutenant through the Army ROTC program at West Virginia State College. The Army was still segregated when he joined and his first assignment was an all-black unit stationed in Bavaria; the executive order commanding racial desegregation of the U.S. military went into effect six months later. By 1954, after Rogers had been denied a path to becoming a chemical engineer with the Army, he submitted his resignation, in part because of a "'clear pattern' of discrimination...He could count on being the ammunition officer or the supply officer, but not the battery executive officer which he called 'the cream-of-the-crop assignment.'" His commanding officer declined to accept his resignation, telling him he had the makings of a good officer. He was promoted to captain, after which he noticed his commanders had started reliably assigning him work he enjoyed doing. He decided to stay with the Army for the time being, although he observed that until the mid-1960s reports on personnel performance included statements like "So-and-So is the finest black captain I know." After two battery commands, he was, "as Battalion S-3...promoted to Major." He was selected to attend the Command and General Staff College, graduating in 1964.

By 1968 he was serving as a lieutenant colonel in command of a 300-man fire support base of 1st Battalion, 5th Field Artillery Regiment, 1st Infantry Division in Vietnam. On November 1, 1968, during Operation Toan Thang II, 1/5th Artillery was manning Fire Support Base Rita (11.579°N 106.375°E) near the Fishhook region of the Cambodian border when it came under heavy attack. Rogers rallied his men in the defense of the base and, despite being several times wounded, continued to lead the battalion until the attack was repulsed. One of the M109 Howitzers used at Fire Base Rita has been preserved at the Field Artillery Museum at Fort Sill. During a 2018 dedication ceremony for a plaque honoring Sgt. Major Ira Whitaker that was placed alongside the gun, an old comrade recalled, "When [Whitaker] got there, there was a [North Vietnamese] sapper trying to climb up onto the front of it, and he annihilated him. And there were two people with RPGs off to his front, and he annihilated them with the help of...Rogers, who received a Medal of Honor. As [lieutenant] colonel at the time, [Rogers] was reloading the ammunition for Sgt. Whitaker as he was firing upon them." Among the multiple injuries Rogers received during the firefight were "one leg was split open from shin to foot" and "a chunk of flesh and nerves...missing from the back of the leg" as the result of a rocket hit that blew him and another soldier into the air.

For his actions during the battle, Rogers was nominated for the Medal of Honor. His nomination was approved and, on May 14, 1970, Rogers and 11 other servicemen were presented with Medals of Honor by US President Richard Nixon at a ceremony in the White House. Back in Vietnam after he was awarded, a colleague later recalled that Rogers sought to return to combat duty, "He wanted to return to action even after he had been decorated. That's the kind of special person he was." When asked about the award in 1975 he said it was an opportunity to remember the 12 Americans killed and 68 wounded in the fight, commending his soldiers for "as great a show of courage [by them] as I've ever seen." Besides the Medal of Honor, during the course of his career he was awarded the Distinguished Flying Cross, the Bronze Star with V device, the Legion of Merit, a Purple Heart, and 10 awards of the Air Medal and the Army's Parachutist badge.

Rogers attended the US Army War College, graduating in 1971. He also earned an M.S. degree in vocational and educational science from Shippensburg State College in Pennsylvania.

He was commander of the 42nd Field Artillery Group in Germany. He was also deputy commander of V Corps Artillery, U.S. Army-Europe, and in 1973 commanding brigadier general of VII Corps Artillery, U.S. Army-Europe. His other commands included 1st Battalion, 5th Artillery, 1st Infantry Division U.S. Army-Pacific; and 1st Battalion, 2nd Brigade, Infantry Basic Combat Training Center at Fort Lewis in Washington state. As a two-star general in 1975 he told a reporter, "We still have and will have what the Defense Department describes as institutional racism. [Discrimination] happens. It's there. In many cases, it's inadvertent. In some cases, it's deliberate. We're never going to eliminate racism in the Army. As long as we do everything to reduce it, we're making some legitimate progress." Circa 1976 Rogers served as deputy chief of staff for Army ROTC. He was also a deputy chief of staff for military operations with the U.S. Army at Washington. In 1979 he was stationed at the Training and Doctrine Command at Fort Monroe, Virginia.

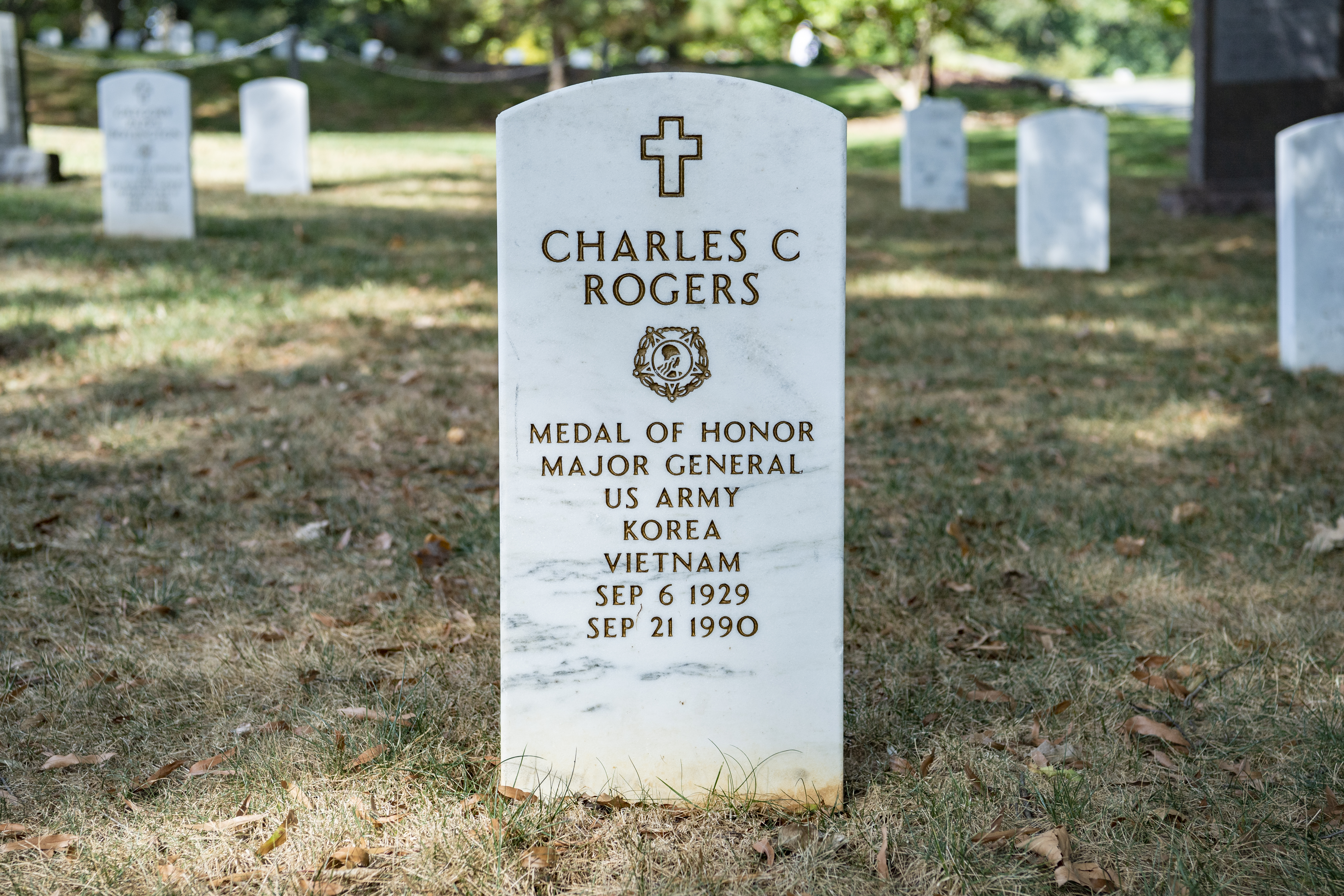
Rogers' grave marker at Arlington National Cemetery

He retired from the army as a major general in January 1984. He later became a Baptist minister in Heidelberg, serving U.S. troops stationed in Germany. After a brief battle with prostate cancer, he died in Munich, Germany in 1990, at age 61. He is buried in Arlington National Cemetery, United States. Colin Powell attended his funeral. He was eulogized as "a role model to the black officers' corps." His coffin was placed on a caisson and escorted to the gravesite by soldiers of the 3rd U.S. Infantry. He was survived by his wife Margarete and three daughters.

== Awards and decorations ==

Army Parachutist Badge
Medal of Honor
Legion of Merit	Distinguished Flying Cross	Bronze Star with Combat V and three bronze oak leaf clusters
Purple Heart	Air Medal with bronze oak leaf cluster and Award numeral 8	Joint Service Commendation Medal
Army Commendation Medal with three bronze oak leaf clusters	Army of Occupation Medal	National Defense Service Medal with bronze oak leaf cluster
Vietnam Service Medal with one silver and two bronze campaign stars	Vietnam Army Distinguished Service Order; 2nd class	Vietnam Campaign Medal

Army Presidential Unit Citation	Republic of Vietnam Gallantry Cross Unit Citation	Republic of Vietnam Civil Actions Unit Citation

=== Medal of Honor citation ===
Rogers' official Medal of Honor citation reads:

For conspicuous gallantry and intrepidity in action at the risk of his life above and beyond the call of duty. Lt. Col. Rogers, Field Artillery, distinguished himself in action while serving as commanding officer, 1st Battalion, during the defense of a forward fire support base. In the early morning hours, the fire support base was subjected to a concentrated bombardment of heavy mortar, rocket and rocket propelled grenade fire. Simultaneously the position was struck by a human wave ground assault, led by sappers who breached the defensive barriers with bangalore torpedoes and penetrated the defensive perimeter. Lt. Col. Rogers with complete disregard for his safety moved through the hail of fragments from bursting enemy rounds to the embattled area. He aggressively rallied the dazed artillery crewmen to man their howitzers and he directed their fire on the assaulting enemy. Although knocked to the ground and wounded by an exploding round, Lt. Col. Rogers sprang to his feet and led a small counterattack force against an enemy element that had penetrated the howitzer positions. Although painfully wounded a second time during the assault, Lt. Col. Rogers pressed the attack killing several of the enemy and driving the remainder from the positions. Refusing medical treatment, Lt. Col. Rogers reestablished and reinforced the defensive positions. As a second human wave attack was launched against another sector of the perimeter, Lt. Col. Rogers directed artillery fire on the assaulting enemy and led a second counterattack against the charging forces. His valorous example rallied the beleaguered defenders to repulse and defeat the enemy onslaught. Lt. Col. Rogers moved from position to position through the heavy enemy fire, giving encouragement and direction to his men. At dawn the determined enemy launched a third assault against the fire base in an attempt to overrun the position. Lt. Col. Rogers moved to the threatened area and directed lethal fire on the enemy forces. Seeing a howitzer inoperative due to casualties, Lt. Col. Rogers joined the surviving members of the crew to return the howitzer to action. While directing the position defense, Lt. Col. Rogers was seriously wounded by fragments from a heavy mortar round which exploded on the parapet of the gun position. Although too severely wounded to physically lead the defenders, Lt. Col. Rogers continued to give encouragement and direction to his men in the defeating and repelling of the enemy attack. Lt. Col. Rogers' dauntless courage and heroism inspired the defenders of the fire support base to the heights of valor to defeat a determined and numerically superior enemy force. His relentless spirit of aggressiveness in action are in the highest traditions of the military service and reflects great credit upon himself, his unit, and the U.S. Army.

== Legacy ==
Rogers is remembered as part of a group of HBCU graduates, including Major General Frederic Davison, and Lieutenant General Julius Becton Jr., who had achieved high command in the U.S. military by the 1970s.

Rogers was the subject of one of the 26 episodes of the 1990s documentary series Heroes, originally broadcast on the A&E Network.

He has been inducted into the West Virginia State University's ROTC Hall of Fame. A road bridge at Cotton Hill in New River Gorge, located not far from where Rogers grew up, was named in his honor in 1999. In October 2023, then-Governor Jim Justice joined other local and state officials and the West Virginia Department of Veterans Assistance to break ground on the Charles C. Rogers State Veterans Nursing Facility in Beckley, West Virginia.

On November 1, 2021, Rogers' service was recognized on the U.S. Department of Defense website as part of their Medal of Honor Monday program. In March 2025, the profile of Rogers was removed from the U.S. Department of Defense website, yielding a 404 not found error, with the letters DEI added to the page's updated URL, thus changing the word medal to deimedal. This was apparently in compliance with Donald Trump's executive orders to terminate acknowledgements of achievements made by historically underrepresented groups. A photograph of Rogers remained live on the defense.gov domain. After the removal was publicly reported, on March 17, the page was restored, with the "deimedal" URL redirecting back to the original link. A spokesperson for the Department of Defense stated that the "story was removed during auto removal process." According to NPR, the department chose not to "provide details about the removal process, or why the page's URL was briefly altered to add the letters dei."

== See also ==
- Operation Toan Thang II § November
- List of Medal of Honor recipients
  - List of Medal of Honor recipients for the Vietnam War
- Military history of African Americans in the Vietnam War
- Riley Leroy Pitts – US Army officer (1937–1967), awarded Medal of Honor
- Anti-DEI deletions by the U.S. Department of Defense
