= Joining Forces =

United States government initiative

- Established: April 12, 2011
- Founders: Michelle Obama; Jill Biden
- Founded at: White House
- Legal status: Government initiative
- Headquarters: White House (Washington, D.C., U.S.)
- Region served: United States
- Executive Director: Sheila Casey
- Website: obamawhitehouse.archives.gov/joiningforces

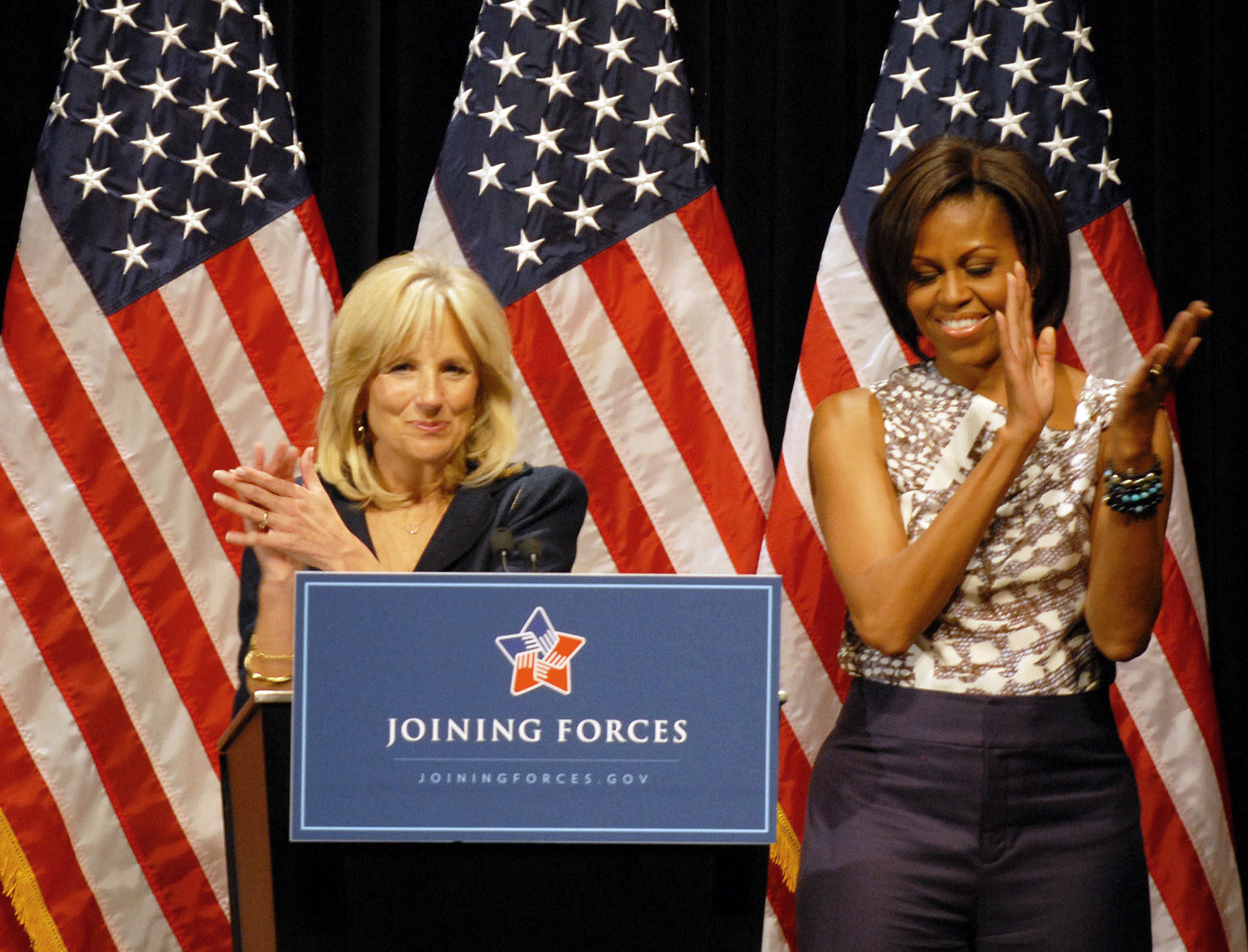
Then Second Lady Jill Biden and First Lady Michelle Obama speak about the newly created Joining Forces initiative, 2011

Joining Forces is a United States government initiative, run out of the White House, that seeks to support the families, caregivers, and survivors of members of the United States Armed Forces. It was founded in 2011 by First Lady Michelle Obama and Second Lady Jill Biden. The particular points of emphasis of Joining Forces are to work with national employers to ease the ability of military spouses to find jobs when they have to relocate; to work on improving educational circumstances for the children of military families, who often have to change schools; and to work with mental health providers to facilitate access to services for military families and caregivers.

== History ==
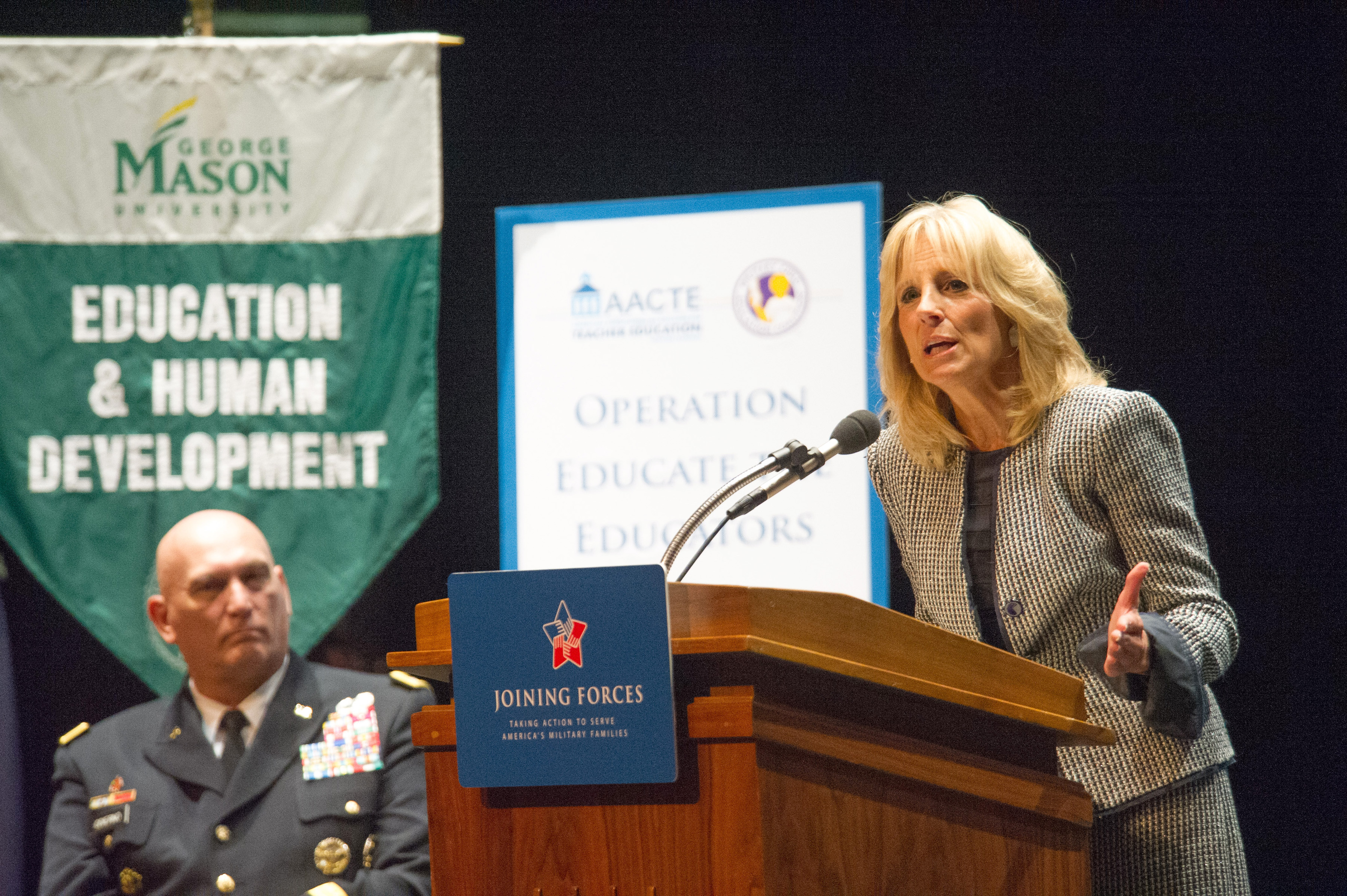
Jill Biden speaks at a Joining Forces event in 2012 about preparing educators to lead classrooms that are more responsive to the social, emotional, and academic needs of military children, as U.S. Army General Ray Odierno looks on

The creation of the Joining Forces program was announced at the White House on April 12, 2011, by Michelle Obama and Jill Biden. The initiative was non-partisan and non-legislative in focus, and sought to use the bully pulpit of the first lady position to make an impact. In that vein, Michelle Obama made a number of high-profile, general-audience television appearances to speak on behalf of Joining Forces and its goals.

The nature of the program means that it has been difficult to quantify success. Six months after it began, an analysis in Time magazine was skeptical that it was achieving much, although the White House pushed back and listed specific areas where the initiative was in position to make gains. Some military families also had doubts as to how many tangible results came from Joining Forces.

Over time, the most concrete results came in the employment sphere, as Joining Forces secured some 1¼ million commitments from corporations to hire military spouses. Another significant success came in gaining legislation in states across the nation to make it easier to transfer occupational licensing certificates for spouses who were frequently moving among states. Over time, as journalist Leo Shane III reported in 2016, the initiative "has been praised by many in the military community for successes in bridging the civilian-military divide, using media campaigns and corporate connections to tackle issues like veterans unemployment, military spouse credentialing and veterans homelessness."

=== 2017-2021: Hiatus by the first Trump administration ===
As the Obama administration came to a close, a poll run by Military.com indicated that military families wanted the program to continue when a new administration came into office in January 2017. It did not continue under that name, although the new presidential and vice-presidential spouses did give attention to the concerns of military families, especially Second Lady Karen Pence. Pence spoke positively of the impact Joining Forces had had on getting states to make occupational re-licensing easier for spouses; but there were still problems with the necessary information about occupational license transfers getting to the military spouses who needed it, something that Pence hoped to address.

=== 2021-2025: Biden administration revival ===
When Jill Biden came back to the White House in January 2021, this time as First Lady, the Joining Forces program was restarted. In April 2021, Biden said, "Just one percent of our country has shouldered the burden of twenty years of war. No one has more strength and grit and resilience than our military families but you can't do this alone, we have to help you carry the weight." The hope was that the initiative would become a permanent entity within the White House, regardless of the administration in office.

== Executive directors ==
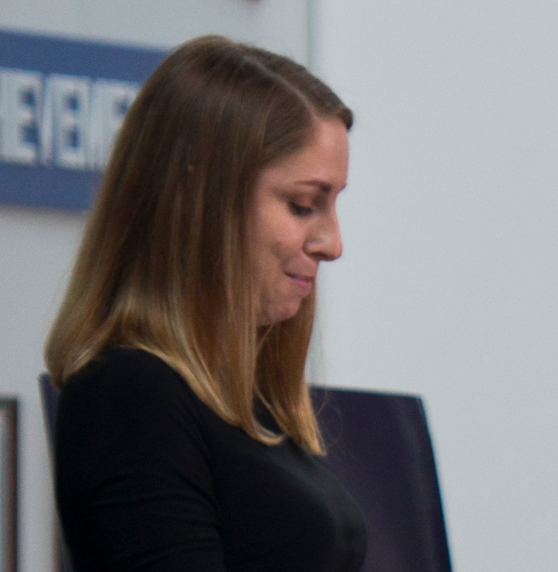
Deputy director (and future executive director) Rory Brosius, 2015

- U.S. Navy Capt. Brad Cooper, 2011–2012
- U.S. Navy Capt. Todd Veazie, 2012–2013
- U.S. Army Col. Rich Morales, 2013–2014
- U.S. Army Col. Steve Parker, 2014–2015
- U.S. Air Force Col. Nicole Malachowski, 2015–2016
- U.S. Army Col. William Johnson, 2016–2017
- Military spouse and former deputy director Rory Brosius, 2021–2023
- Sheila Casey, 2023–present, wife of former Army Chief of Staff George W. Casey Jr. and the former chairwoman of Blue Star Families.
