= Harold Gonsalves =

United States Marine (1926–1945)

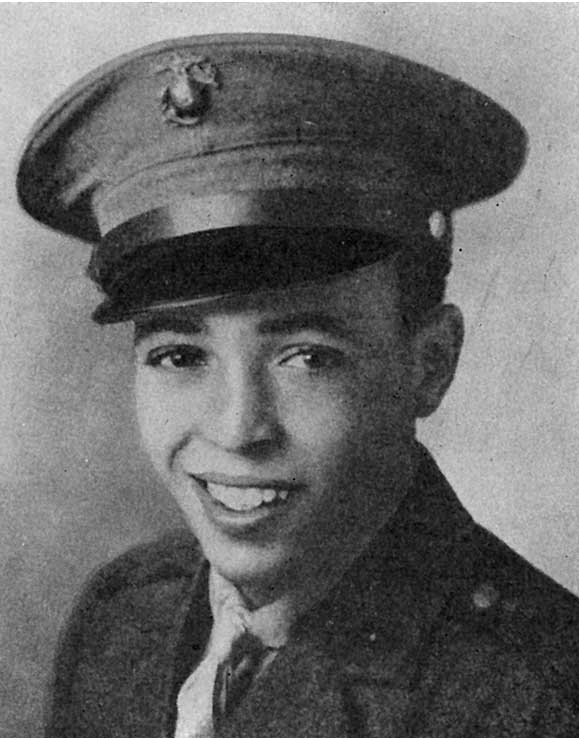
- PFC Harold Gonsalves, Medal of Honor recipient
- Born: January 28, 1926; Alameda, California, U.S.
- Died: April 15, 1945 (aged 19); Okinawa, Ryukyu Islands, Japanese Empire
- Burial place: Golden Gate National Cemetery, San Bruno, California, U.S.
- Military career
- Allegiance: United States of America
- Branch: United States Marine Corps
- Service years: 1943–1945
- Rank: Private First Class
- Units: Battery L, 4th Battalion, 15th Marines, 6th Marine Division
- Conflicts: World War II: Battle of Eniwetok; Battle of Guam; Battle of Okinawa †
- Awards: Medal of Honor; Purple Heart Medal; Combat Action Ribbon; Presidential Unit Citation; Navy Unit Commendation (2)

Harold Gonsalves (January 28, 1926 – April 15, 1945) was a United States Marine Corps private first class who was killed in action during the Battle of Okinawa in World War II. He was posthumously awarded the nation's highest military award for valor, the Medal of Honor, for his heroic action on April 15, 1945.

== Early years ==
Gonsalves, a Portuguese-American, was born in Alameda, California, on January 28, 1926. A substantial Portuguese-American immigrant community centered around Oakland had developed in the San Francisco Bay Area beginning in the 1880s. His father's family may have immigrated to the United States from Portugal in 1888, and his mother, born Anna Cambra in territorial-era Hawaii, was also descended from Portuguese immigrants. His father, John, was born in Massachusetts, had a fifth-grade education, and worked in a boiler factory, and as a teamster, driving trucks for a lumber company in Oakland. Gonsalves had a sister, Marie, who was about five years younger. He attended school in Alameda. At Alameda High School, Gonsalves had taken part in football, basketball, baseball, track, and swimming. He also sang tenor in the school glee club. After two and one-half years of high school, Gonsalves quit to take a job as a stock clerk with Montgomery Ward in Oakland and then join the war effort.

== World War II ==
=== U.S. Marine Corps ===
Gonsalves enlisted in the Marine Corps Reserve on May 27, 1943, and was called to active duty on June 17. He went through recruit training at Marine Corps Recruit Depot San Diego, California, and then, at his own request, was sent to the Marine Raiders at Camp Pendleton, California. Gonsalves was later transferred to the artillery at the same camp. He was classified as a cannoneer on 75 and 105-millimeter guns before joining the 30th Replacement Battalion in the fall of 1943.

=== Overseas ===
Pvt. Gonsalves left the United States on November 8, 1943, and was assigned to the 2nd Pack Howitzer Battalion at the end of the month, which was then in Hawaii. He was promoted to private first class in March 1944, and with his battalion, became part of the 22nd Marine Regiment two months later.

Gonsalves participated in the assault, capture, and occupation of Engebi and Parry Islands, in the Marshall Islands. The 22nd Marines was cited by Major General Thomas E. Watson, commanding general of Tactical Group I, for their part in the Marshalls' Campaign. From Eniwetok, Gonsalves accompanied the 22nd Marines to Kwajalein, to Guadalcanal, back to Kwajelein and Eniwetok, then up to Guam in July, where he took part in the liberation of that pre-war American island.

After Guam, the 22nd Marines returned to Guadalcanal. In November, Gonsalves was detached from the regiment and joined Battery L, 4th Battalion, 15th Marine Regiment, 6th Marine Division.

=== Okinawa ===
PFC Gonsalves landed with the 15th Marines on Okinawa on April 1, 1945. On April 15, he was a member of an eight-man forward observer team that directed artillery fire in support of an attack by the infantry on Japanese positions on Motobu Peninsula. There was an entrenched Japanese unit at Mount Yae. When it finally became necessary for the team to advance to the actual front lines, the officer in charge took Gonsalves and another man with him. Gonsalves was at that time the acting Scout Sergeant of the team, with Battery L, Fourth Battalion, 15th Marines of the Sixth Division. He and the other Marine were to lay telephone lines for communication with the artillery battalion. As the team advanced to the front, they were brought under heavy enemy rifles, grenades, and mortar fire. Just as the three had reached the front lines, a Japanese grenade landed among them. It was less than a foot from them. Without a moment's hesitation, Gonsalves flung himself on the grenade, taking the full explosion. The other two Marines were not touched by grenade fragments and successfully completed their mission.

According to newspaper account, "After he was wounded and being returned to the lines in a stretcher he was fatally shot by snipers." Gonsalves was only 19 years old when he was killed in action.

== Post-World War II ==
=== Medal of Honor ===
The Medal of Honor, with citation signed by President Harry S. Truman, was presented on June 19, 1946, to PFC Gonsalves' sister in the presence of his parents at ceremonies in the office of the commanding general of the Department of the Pacific, Major General Henry Louis Larsen, USMC at the U.S. Navy Building in San Francisco, California.

=== Burial ===
PFC Gonsalves' remains were returned to the United States for reinterment after the war. He was buried with full military honors in Golden Gate National Cemetery in San Bruno, California, on March 20, 1949.

=== Censorship ===
On March 5, 2025, following the executive orders of President Donald Trump, Defense Secretary Pete Hegseth ordered the U.S. military to remove diversity-related content across the federal government. A photograph of Gonsalves was included among the 26,000 pieces of content flagged for removal for being perceived as promoting diversity, equity and inclusion due to his perceived racial background, having been of Portuguese heritage.

== Namesakes ==
Established in 1958, the Northern Training Area, a US Marine Corps training base located in 20,000 acres (80 km^{2}) of single and double canopy jungle on the northern end of Okinawa, was named after PFC Gonsalves in 1986. Its name was later changed in 1998 to the Marine Corps Jungle Warfare Training Center.

Gonsalves Avenue, on Marine Corps Air Station Miramar (MCAS Miramar) was named after PFC Gonsalves after the Marine Corps assumed control in 1997.

== Medal of Honor citation ==
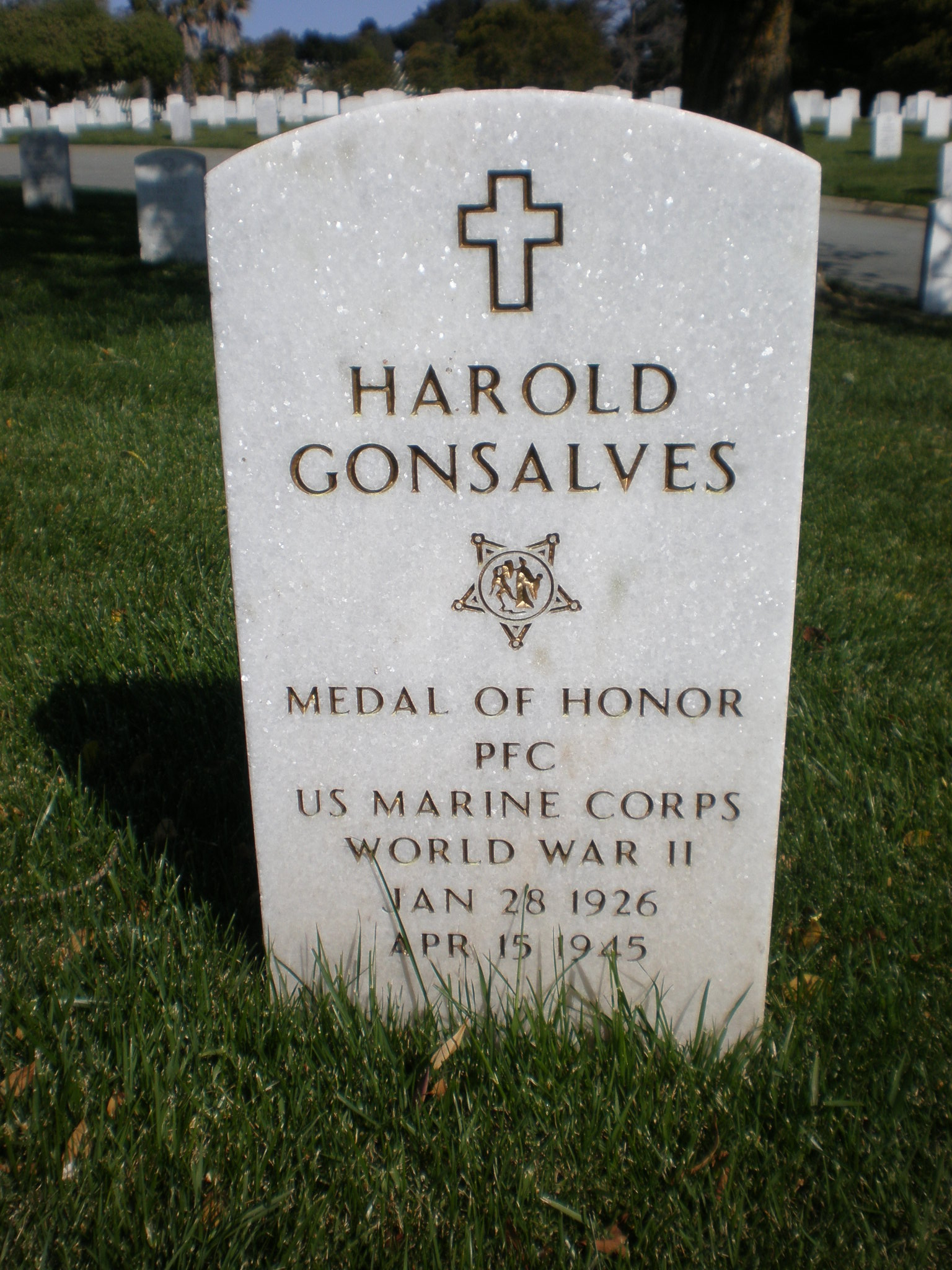
Gonsalves' headstone

The President of the United States takes pride in presenting the MEDAL OF HONOR posthumously to

PRIVATE FIRST CLASS HAROLD GONSALVES
UNITED STATES MARINE CORPS RESERVE

for service as set forth in the following CITATION:

For conspicuous gallantry and intrepidity at the risk of his life above and beyond the call of duty as Acting Scout Sergeant of a Forward Observer Team, serving with Battery L, Fourth Battalion, Fifteenth Marines, Sixth Marine Division, during action against enemy Japanese forces in Okinawa Shima in the Ryūkyū Chain, 15 April 1945. Undaunted by the powerfully organized opposition encountered on Motobu Peninsula during a fierce assault waged by a Marine infantry battalion against a Japanese strong-hold, Private First Class Gonsalves repeatedly braved the terrific hostile bombardment to aid his Forward Observation Team in directing well-placed artillery fire and, when his commanding officer determined to move into the front lines in order to register a more effective bombardment in the enemy's defensive position, unhesitatingly advanced uphill with the officer and another Marine despite a slashing barrage of enemy mortar and rifle fire. As they reached the front, a Japanese grenade fell close within the group. Instantly Private First Class Gonsalves dived on the deadly missile, absorbing the exploding charge in his own body and thereby protecting the others from serious and perhaps fatal wounds. Stouthearted and indomitable, Private First Class Gonsalves readily yielded his own chances of survival that his fellow Marines might carry on the relentless battle against the fanatic Japanese and his cool decision, prompt action and valiant spirit of self-sacrifice in the face of certain death reflect the highest credit upon himself and the United States Naval Service. He gallantly gave his life in the service of his country.

/S/ HARRY S. TRUMAN

== Awards and decorations ==

Badge	Medal of Honor		Purple Heart
1st row	Combat Action Ribbon	Navy Presidential Unit Citation	Navy Unit Commendation with one service star
2nd row	American Campaign Medal	Asiatic-Pacific Campaign Medal with one campaign star	World War II Victory Medal

Harold Gonsalves
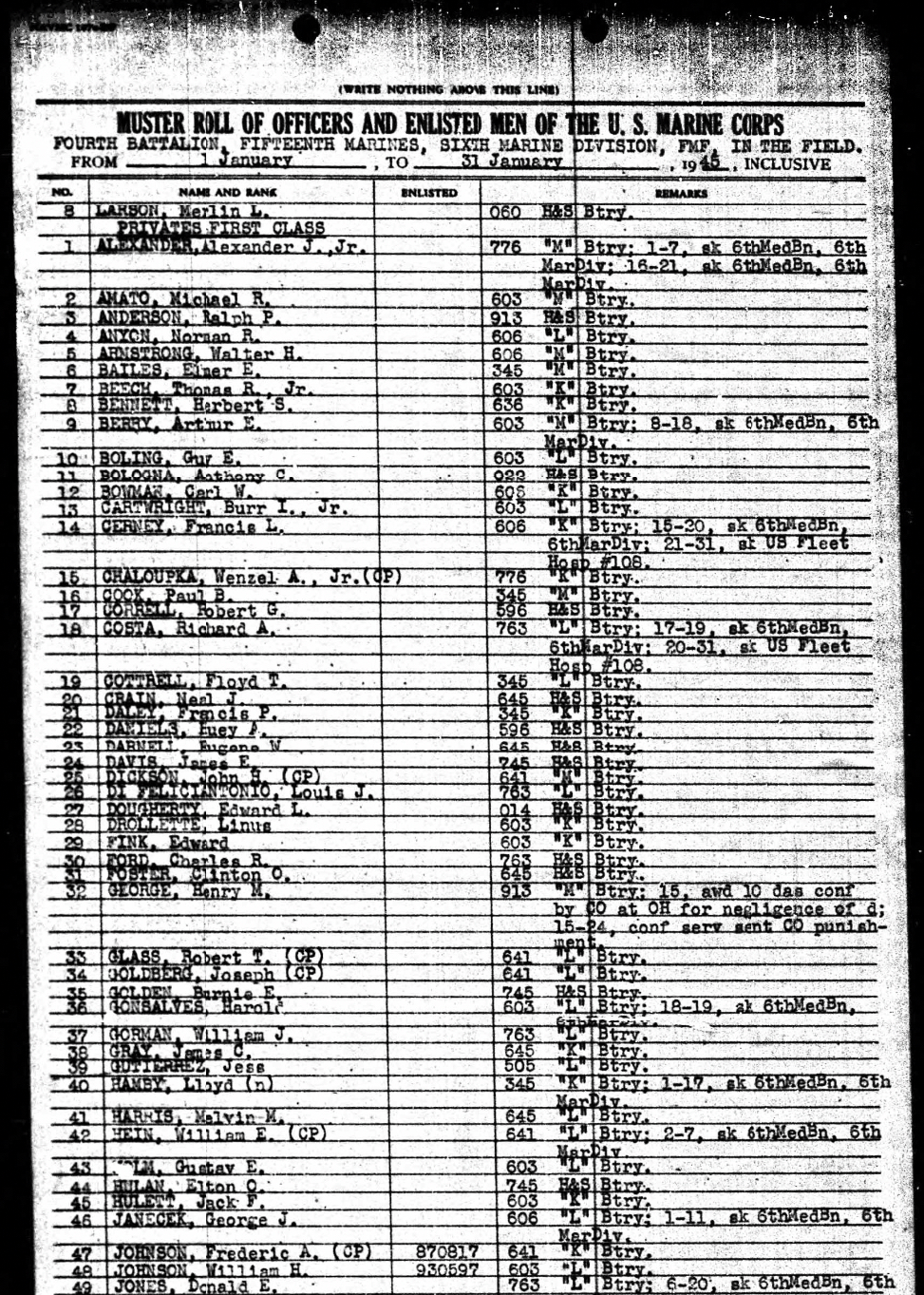
Harold Gonsalves - January 1945 muster roll, Fourth Battalion, Fifteenth Marines, Sixth Marine Division "Fmf, In The Field."

== See also ==
- List of Medal of Honor recipients
- List of Medal of Honor recipients for World War II
- List of Portuguese-American Medal of Honor recipients
- List of Hispanic Medal of Honor recipients
- Hispanics in the United States Marine Corps
- Hispanic Americans in World War II
- Anti-DEI deletions by the U.S. Department of Defense
