= Saleha Jabeen =

United States Air Force chaplain

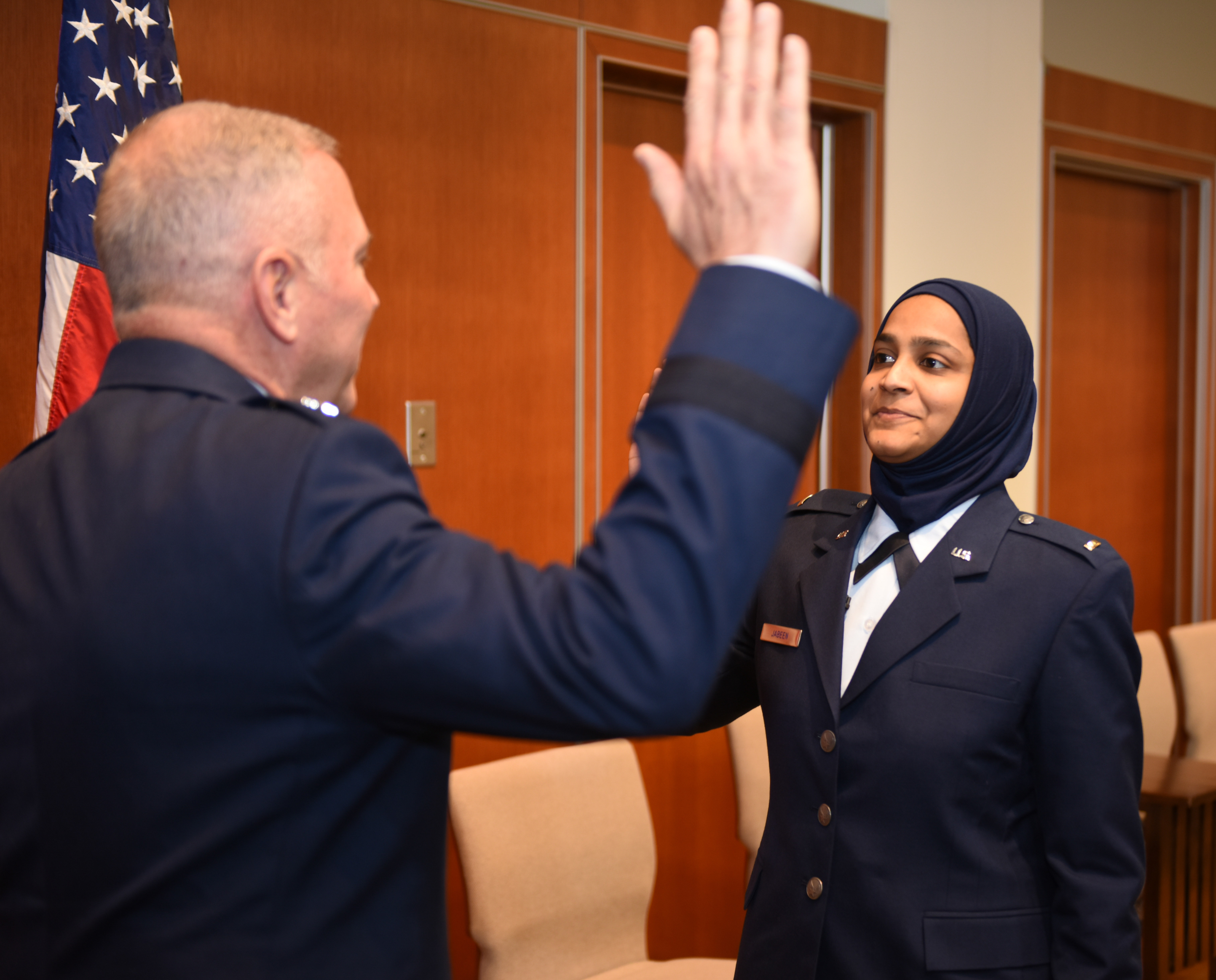
Saleha Jabeen is commissioned by U.S. Air Force Chief of Chaplains (Maj. Gen.) Steven Schaick, December 18, 2019, at the Catholic Theological Union, in Chicago, Illinois.

Saleha Jabeen is a United States Air Force officer.

In 2019, she was commissioned as the first female Muslim chaplain candidate in the history of the U.S. military. Jabeen serves as chaplain to the 517th Training Group at the Presidio of Monterey, California.

== Biography ==
Jabeen was born and grew up in India, emigrating to the United States in 2005 as an international student. While pursuing a business degree at North Park University in Chicago, Jabeen experienced racism, Islamophobia and bigotry. Partly due to her experience, she changed her degree to pursue studies towards two master’s degrees, a Master of Divinity and Master of Arts in Theology, specializing in Interreligious Dialogue.

Jabeen graduated from Catholic Theological Union in 2014. She later joined the Army Medical Corps, following her brother into the service to help support her graduate-school tuition. While serving, she came into contact with the chaplaincy service, which encouraged her to pursue a career as a military chaplain. Female chaplains in the United States military are rare; as of November 2019, there were only 161 active duty female chaplains across all branches of the military.

=== Chaplain candidate ===
Jabeen was commissioned as a chaplain candidate on December 18, 2019. On her appointment, she became the first female Muslim chaplain candidate in the history of the U.S. military. She has an ecclesiastical endorsement from the Islamic Society of North America. At the time, U.S. Air Force Chief of Chaplains Maj. Gen. Steven Schaick said of her appointment,

"Any time we advance religious freedoms, it’s a win for all persons of faith...The fact is America is a place where the Constitution guarantees your freedom to embrace or abstain from religious ideals, and the Chaplain Corps, which Jabeen just entered, exists to ensure every Airman has a religious freedom advocate. This is a big day not just for Muslims, but for persons of all faiths. I could not be more proud of our Air Force for being willing to commission and embrace the first female Imam in the Department of Defense.”

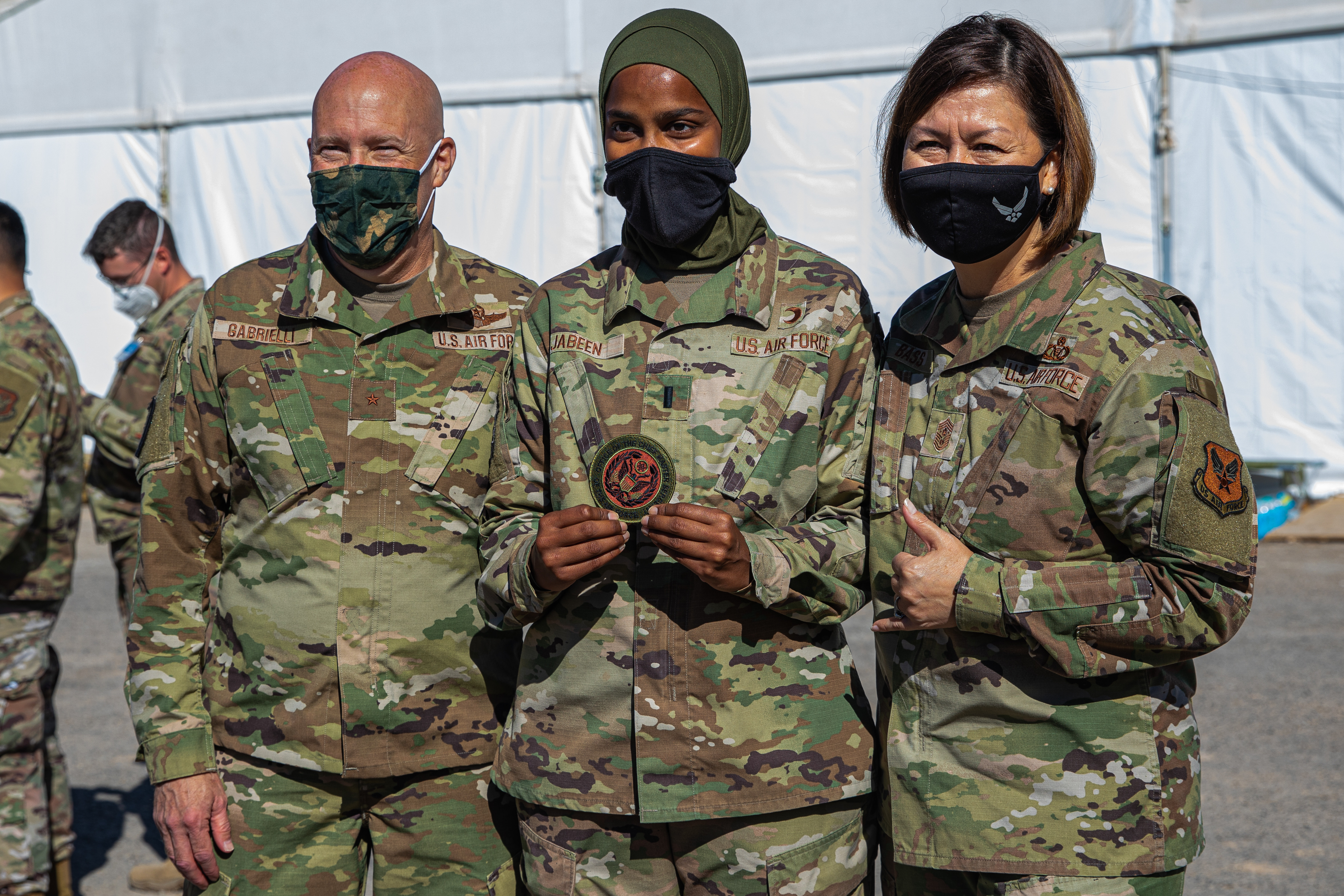
Brig. Gen. Daniel Gabrielli, 1st Lt. Saleha Jabeen, center, and Chief Master Sgt. of the Air Force JoAnne S. Bass pose for photo as part of a visit to Holloman Air Force Base, New Mexico, October 13, 2021.

=== Chaplain service ===
Jabeen graduated from the Air Force Basic Chaplain Course on February 5, 2021, at Maxwell Air Force Base. Later that year, Jabeen was deployed as a religious and cultural advisor as part of Task Force-Holloman for Operation Allies Refuge, supporting the patriation of 50,000 Afghan evacuees in the United States at Holloman Air Force Base.

In 2022, Jabeen was assigned as chaplain to the 517th Training Group at the Presidio of Monterey, California.

In 2023, Jabeen was featured in Three Chaplains, a documentary about the struggles of Muslim chaplains and service members in the U.S. military.

=== Erasure of content ===
Materials published by the U.S. Air Force related to Jabeen's service were later removed from the internet as part of the 2025 U.S. Department of Defense censorship of DEI-connected material purge.

== See also ==
- Muslims in the United States military
