= Claremont, West Virginia =

Unincorporated community in West Virginia, United States

- Unincorporated community
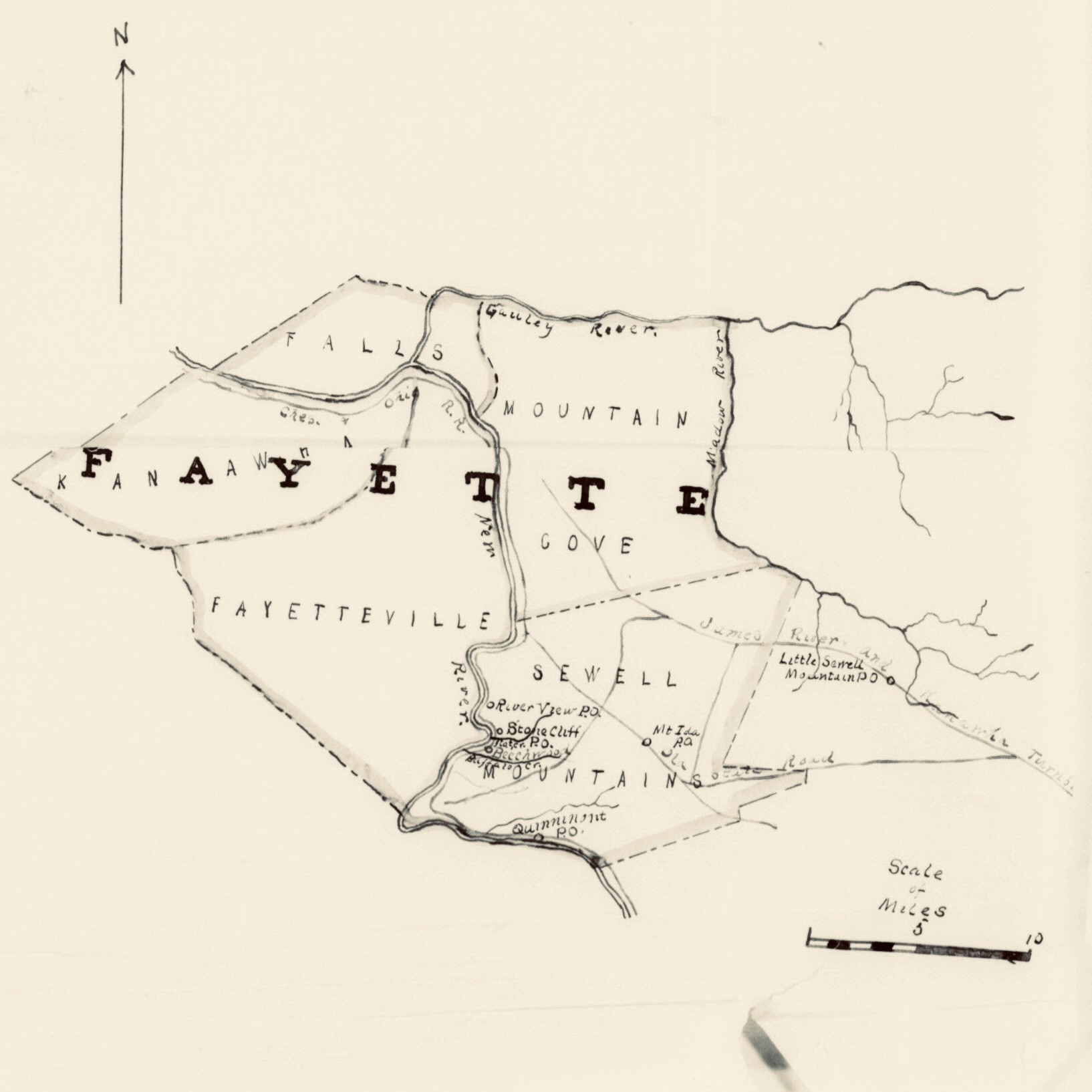
- Location of "Beechwood" on hand-drawn map depicting part of Fayette County, West Virginia c. 1887

- Location within West Virginia Location within the United States
- Coordinates: 37°55′5″N 81°3′3″W
- Country: United States
- State: West Virginia
- County: Fayette
- Elevation: 1,093 ft (333 m)
- Time zone: UTC-5 (Eastern (EST))
  - Summer (DST): UTC-4 (EDT)
- GNIS ID: 1549627

Claremont is an unincorporated community and defunct coal camp in Fayette County, West Virginia, United States. It was also known as Beechwood. As of 2022, little evidence of the former settlement remains. The camp was founded in 1887, and after the mine closed in the 1940s most of the residents moved away, although it hosted schools until the 1960s. A prep plant was built there in the 1980s but later abandoned.
