= Ola Mildred Rexroat =

American aviator (1917–2017)

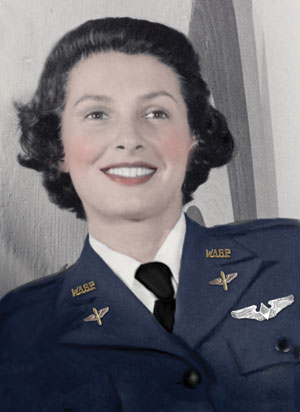
- Ola Mildred Rexroat
- Nickname: Millie
- Born: August 28, 1917; Argonia, Kansas, United States
- Died: June 28, 2017 (aged 99) Hot Springs, South Dakota, U.S.
- Allegiance: Oglala Nation; United States
- Branch: Women Airforce Service Pilots; United States Air Force; Air Force Reserve Command
- Service years: 1942–1954
- Rank: Captain
- Awards: Congressional Gold Medal
- Other work: Aviator, USAF air traffic controller, FAA air traffic controller

Ola Mildred Rexroat (August 28, 1917 – June 28, 2017) was the only Native American woman to serve in the Women Airforce Service Pilots (WASP).

== Early life ==
Rexroat was born in Argonia, Kansas in 1917, to a Euro-American father and an Oglala mother. Her father was a publisher and editor and moved frequently. The family moved to South Dakota when she was young, and she spent at least part of her youth with her grandmother on the Pine Ridge Reservation. Starting in 1923, the family moved so she could attend public school in Wynona, Oklahoma. She graduated from the St. Mary's Episcopal Indian School in Springfield, South Dakota, in 1932. Rexroat initially enrolled in a teachers college in Chadron, Nebraska, but left before completing her degree to work for what is now the Bureau of Indian Affairs for a year. She earned a bachelor's degree in art from the University of New Mexico in 1939. After college, she again worked for the Bureau of Indian Affairs in Gallup, New Mexico for a year.

== Aviation career and later life ==
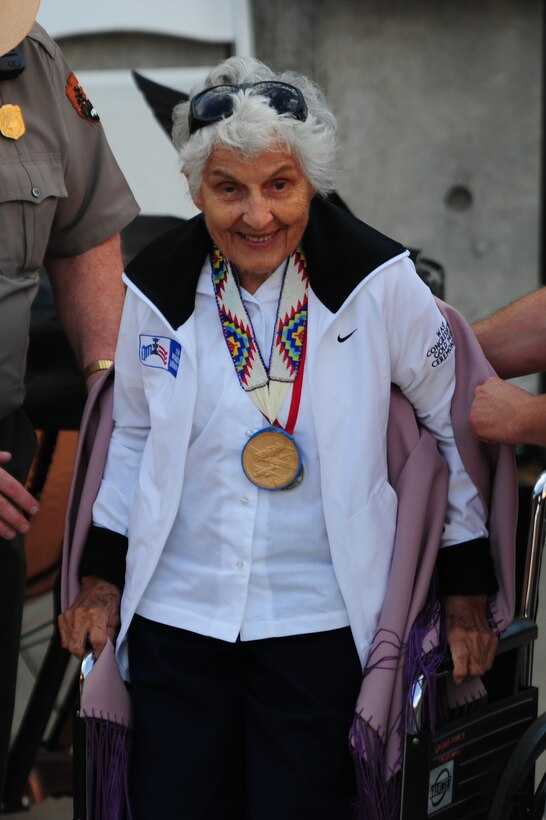
Ola Mildred Rexroat wearing her Congressional Gold Medal at the 2010 Independence Day celebration at Mount Rushmore.

Rexroat next worked for engineers building airfields in El Paso, where she decided to learn how to fly. In order to do so, she would need her own airplane or to join the Women Airforce Service Pilots (WASP). Selecting the latter, she moved to Washington, D.C. in 1943, with her mother and sisters, and was also employed at the Army War College. Rexroat then went for WASP training in Sweetwater, Texas, and was assigned the dangerous job of towing targets for aerial gunnery students at Eagle Pass Army Airfield after her graduation. She also helped transport cargo and personnel.

When the WASPs were disbanded in December 1944, she joined the US Air Force, where she served for ten years as an air traffic controller at Kirkland Air Force Base in New Mexico during the Korean War.

After her time in the Air Force Reserves was complete in 1954 she continued to work as an air traffic controller for the Federal Aviation Administration for 33 years. Not until she was 60 years old in 1977 did the WASP attain official military recognition and hence veteran status.

In 2007 she was inducted into the South Dakota Aviation Hall of Fame.

In 2009, she was awarded the Congressional Gold Medal along with all the other WASP for outstanding accomplishments.

== Personal life and death ==
Rexroat raised one son. She died in June 2017 at the age of 99. Immediately before her death she was the last surviving WASP in South Dakota and one of 275 living WASPs out of the original 1,074.

== Legacy ==
Several months after her death, the airfield operations building at Ellsworth Air Force Base was named after her.

Her life inspired a picture book for children named At the Mountain's base.
