= Nicole Malachowski =

US Air Force officer

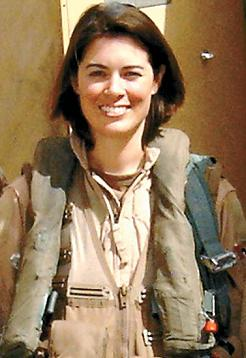
- Born: 26 September 1974 (age 52)
- Military career
- Allegiance: United States
- Branch: United States Air Force
- Service years: 1996–2017
- Rank: Colonel
- Commands: 333d Fighter Squadron
- Conflicts: Operation Deliberate Forge; Operation Iraqi Freedom; Operation Noble Eagle
- Awards: Meritorious Service Medal; Air Medal; Air Force Commendation Medal; Air Force Achievement Medal; Combat Readiness Medal; National Defense Service Medal; Armed Forces Expeditionary Medal; Kosovo Campaign Medal; Global War on Terrorism Service Medal; Korea Defense Service Medal; Air and Space Campaign Medal

Nicole Margaret Ellingwood Malachowski (born 26 September 1974) is a retired United States Air Force (USAF) officer and the first female pilot selected to fly as part of the USAF Air Demonstration Squadron, better known as the Thunderbirds. She later became a speaker and advocate on behalf of patients with tick-borne illnesses.

Malachowski was a Civil Air Patrol cadet before she entered the United States Air Force Academy in 1992. She was commissioned as a second lieutenant upon graduation in 1996. Her first public performance with the Thunderbirds was in March 2006, and her aviator call sign was "FiFi". She spent the 2006 and 2007 air show seasons flying the Number 3 (right wing) aircraft in the diamond formation. Between 1 September 2008 and 31 August 2009, Malachowski was on special assignment, participating in the White House Fellows Program for the Class of 2008–2009, assigned to the General Services Administration. In 2011, she took command of the 333d Fighter Squadron at Seymour Johnson Air Force Base, North Carolina. In September 2015, she returned to the White House to become the executive director of its Joining Forces initiative for supporting veterans, service members, and military families. She was medically retired from the USAF in 2017 after attaining the rank of colonel. In 2019, she was inducted into the National Women's Hall of Fame.

== Early years, education, and personal biography ==
Nicole Malachowski was born Nicole Ellingwood in Santa Maria, California, to Cathy and Robert Ellingwood. In high school, she was a cadet member of the Nevada Wing of the Civil Air Patrol and participated in AFJROTC, where she was rated cadet colonel, the highest rank a cadet could achieve. She started working on her pilot's license before graduating from high school. She graduated from Western High School in Las Vegas in 1992.

She earned a Bachelor of Science degree in management, with a minor in French, from the United States Air Force Academy, graduating 4th in the class of 1996. While at the academy she was both a pilot and cadet instructor pilot in the academy's TG-4 glider program. She also earned a Master of Arts degree from American Military University in National Security Policy, and a second in National Security and Strategic Studies from the U.S. Naval War College, where she graduated with highest distinction. While at the Naval War College, Malachowski was the first USAF officer to earn the Admiral Stephen B. Luce Award as the class honor graduate.

Malachowski is married to Lieutenant Colonel Paul G. Malachowski (USAF, retired), a former F-15E Strike Eagle Weapon Systems Officer. The couple met while both were serving as aircrew in the 48th Fighter Wing at RAF Lakenheath in the United Kingdom. In April 2010 she was admitted to the Mother and Infant Care Center (MICC) of the National Naval Medical Center in Bethesda, Maryland, in expectation of the birth of twins. After a confinement of nine weeks, she gave birth to daughter Norah and son Garrick on 6 June 2010. After medically retiring in 2017, Malachowski became a public speaker and patient advocate for people with tick borne illnesses.

== Professional career ==
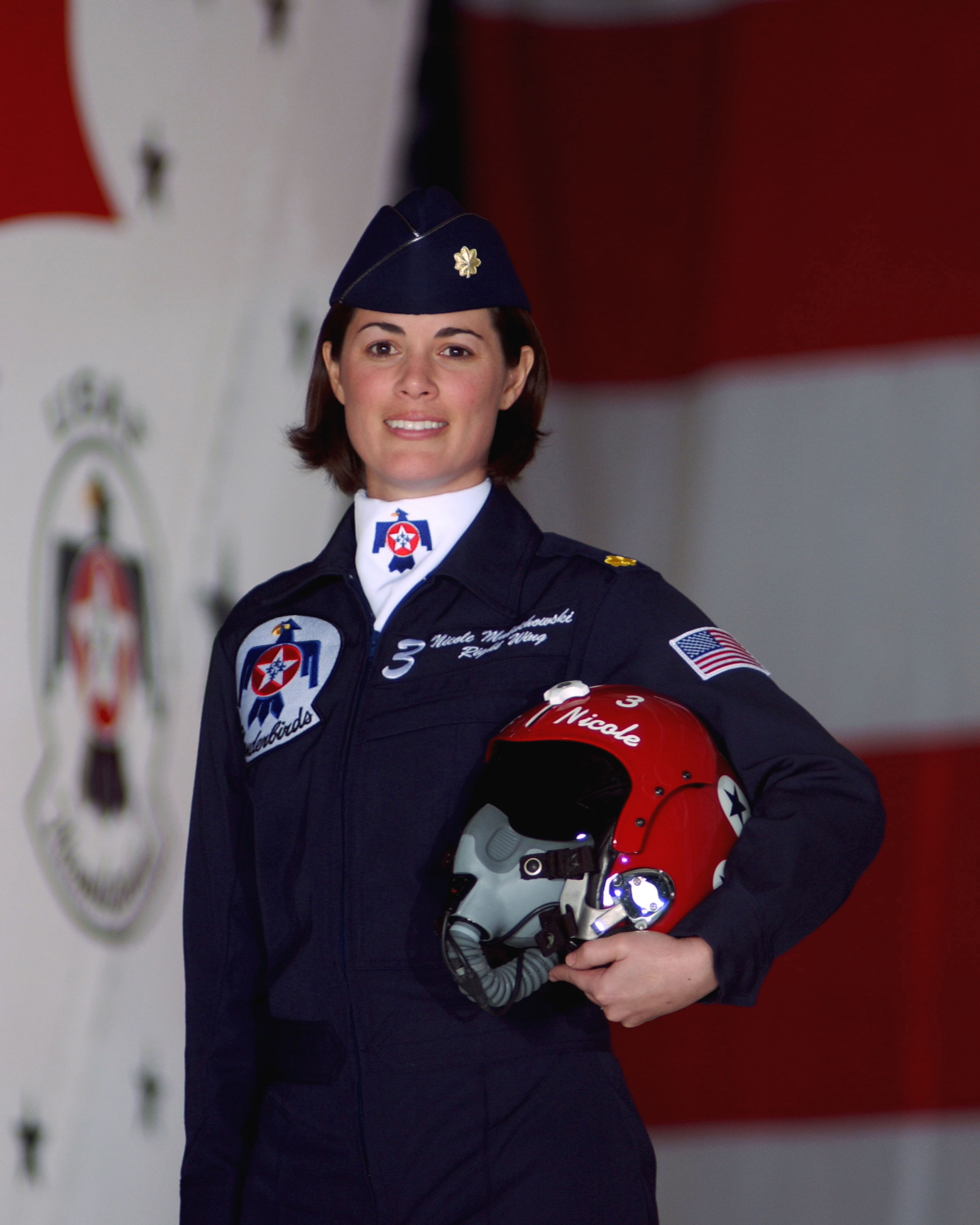
USAF Thunderbirds portrait

Malachowski attended undergraduate pilot training at Columbus AFB, Mississippi. She trained at Seymour Johnson AFB, North Carolina, with the 4th Fighter Wing on the F-15E Strike Eagle.

Nicole Malachowski, The First Lady Pilot of Thunderbirds Airshow Team

She served two operational tours at RAF Lakenheath, England, with the 48th Fighter Wing; assignment to the 4th Fighter Wing at Seymour Johnson AFB; and as an Air Liaison Officer supporting the 2nd Infantry Division at Camp Red Cloud, South Korea. During her second tour at RAF Lakenheath, Malachowski deployed for four months in early 2005 in support of Operation Iraqi Freedom, flying 26 combat missions. She applied and was accepted as a Thunderbirds pilot in June 2005. She completed transition training to the F-16 Fighting Falcon with the 56th Fighter Wing at Luke AFB, Arizona and flew with the Thunderbird Team based at Nellis AFB, Nevada from November 2005 until November 2007.

After successfully completing her tour with the USAF Thunderbirds in November 2007, including approximately 140 performances, Malachowski served on staff of the Commander, United States Air Force Warfare Center, at Nellis AFB, to June 2008.

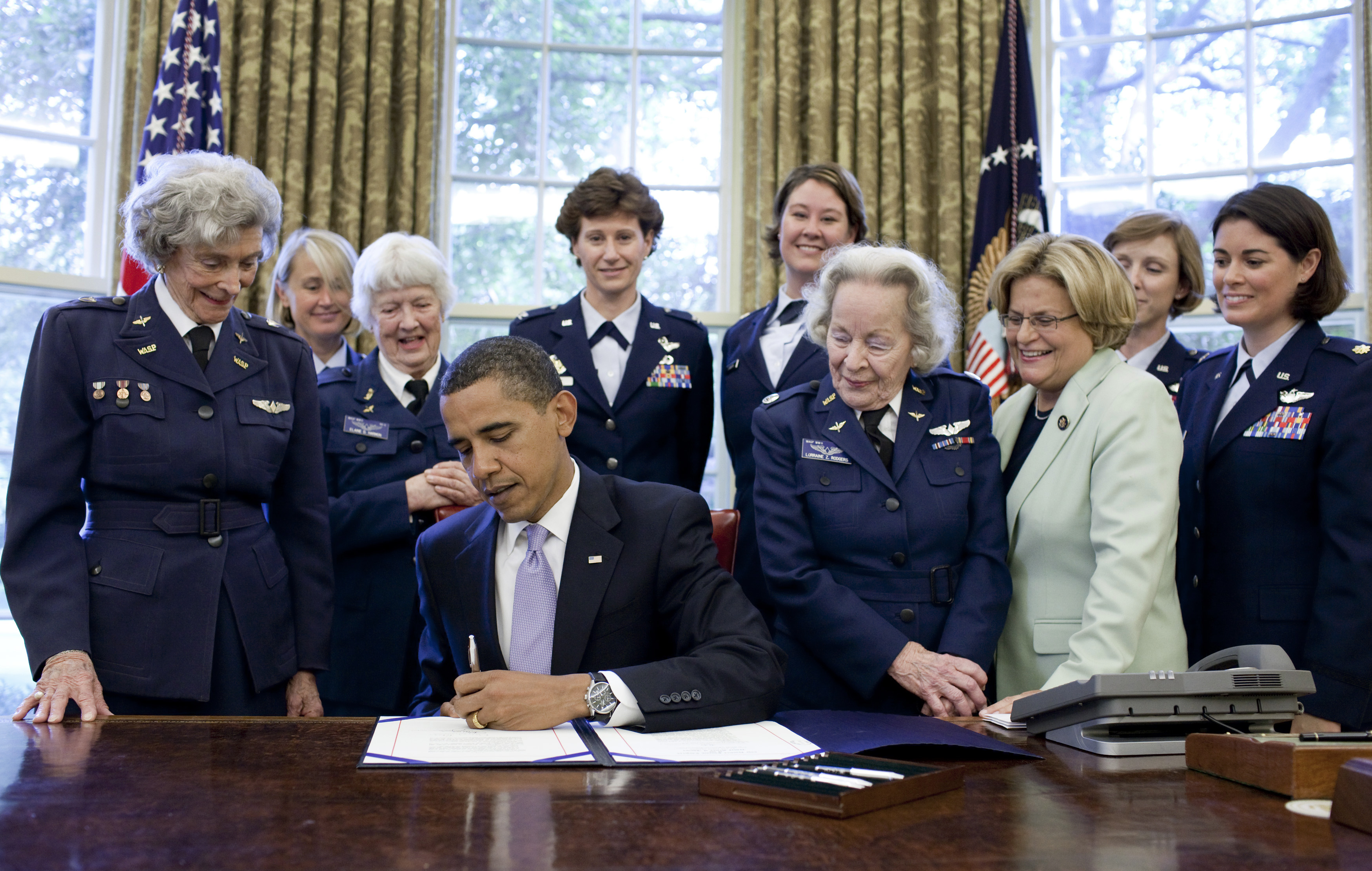
Major Malachowski (far right) at July 2009 White House ceremony honoring WASPs.

Malachowski was then selected to participate as a White House Fellow in Washington, D.C., from 1 September 2008 to 31 August 2009, serving in the General Services Administration with the Presidential Transition Support Team and as deputy chief of staff. Malachowski has been an advocate of recognition of the Women Airforce Service Pilots (WASP), America's first women military aviators who served during World War II. On 1 July 2009, she participated in a White House ceremony at which legislation (S.614) awarding a Congressional Gold Medal to the WASP was signed into law by President Barack Obama. Although she had to use a wheelchair due to a broken left leg, Lt Col Malachowski delivered remarks during the ceremony held 10 March 2010, in the United States Capitol awarding Deanie Bishop Parrish the medal on behalf of all 1,102 WASP pilots.

Malachowski served as deputy commander of the 4th Operations Support Squadron, 4th Operations Group, until 18 November 2011, when she took command of the 333d Fighter Squadron at Seymour Johnson AFB.

She completed her assignment with the 333d in May 2013 and reported to the Naval War College in Newport, Rhode Island as a student.

After leaving the War College, Malachowski served as the deputy director of United States Air Force Readiness and Training at the Department of Defense. In May 2015, she was announced as the new executive director of Joining Forces, First Lady Michelle Obama and Second Lady Jill Biden's initiative to support veterans, service members, and military families.

Col. Malachowski medically retired in 2017 after serving 21 years because she contracted a tick-borne illness.

In March 2025, information about Malachowski was removed from the Air Force website as part of a move to end DEI programs; it was reinstated in April 2025 after media coverage.

== Assignments ==
1. December 1996 – March 1998: Student, Undergraduate Pilot Training Class 98–03, Columbus AFB, Mississippi.
2. March 1998 – January 1999: Student, F-15E Formal Training Unit, 333d Fighter Squadron, Seymour Johnson AFB, North Carolina.
3. January 1999 – October 2000: F-15E pilot, Ground Training Officer, Standardization and Evaluation Liaisons Officer 492d Fighter Squadron, RAF Lakenheath, England.
4. October 2000 – January 2003: F-15E Instructor Pilot, Chief of Life Support, Assistant Chief of Scheduling, Weapons Flight Electronic Combat Pilot, Functional Check Flight Pilot, Supervisor of Flying, 336th Fighter Squadron, Seymour Johnson AFB, North Carolina.
5. January 2003 – January 2004: Army Liaison Officer, Chief of Standardization and Evaluation, deputy director of Main Air Support Operations Center, ASOC Fighter Duty Officer, 604th Air Support Operations Squadron, Camp Red Cloud, South Korea.
6. January 2004 – March 2004: Student, F-15E TX-2, Class 04-BTE2, 333d Fighter Squadron, Seymour Johnson AFB, North Carolina.
7. March 2004 – July 2005: F-15E Instructor Pilot, C-Flight Commander, Supervisor of Flying, 494th Fighter Squadron, RAF Lakenheath, United Kingdom.
8. August 2005 – October 2005: Student, F-16C/D TX-2, Class 05-ATC, 61st Fighter Squadron, Luke AFB, Arizona.
9. November 2005 – November 2007: pilot, USAF Air Demonstration Squadron, Nellis AFB, Nevada.
10. December 2007 – June 2008: Deputy Chief, Commander's Action Group, United States Air Force Warfare Center, Nellis AFB.
11. September 2008 – September 2009: General Services Administration, White House Fellow
12. September 2009 to October 2010: SAF/IA Weapons Division, Chief, International Developmental Fighter Programs
13. October 2010 to March 2011: Director of Operations, 4th Operations Support Squadron, Seymour-Johnson AFB, NC
14. November 2011 to May 2013: Commander, 333d Fighter Squadron, Seymour Johnson AFB, NC
15. June 2013 – June 2014: Student, Naval War College, Newport, RI
16. September 2015 - May 2016: Executive Director of Joining Forces initiative, White House Fellow

== Flight information ==
Rating: Command Pilot
Flight hours: More than 2,300
Aircraft flown: Laister-Kauffman TG-4, McDonnell Douglas F-15E Strike Eagle, General Dynamics F-16 Fighting Falcon

== Awards and decorations ==
Nicole Malachowski's ribbons as of 1 August 2009:

Meritorious Service Medal with bronze oak leaf cluster
Air Medal
Air Force Commendation Medal with bronze oak leaf cluster
Air Force Achievement Medal with two bronze oak leaf clusters
Air Force Outstanding Unit Award with silver oak leaf cluster
Air Force Organizational Excellence Award
Combat Readiness Medal
National Defense Service Medal
Armed Forces Expeditionary Medal
Kosovo Campaign Medal
Global War on Terrorism Service Medal
Korea Defense Service Medal
Air and Space Campaign Medal
Air Force Overseas Short Tour Service Ribbon
Air Force Overseas Long Tour Service Ribbon
Air Force Longevity Service Award with three bronze oak leaf clusters
Air Force Training Ribbon

=== Other achievements ===
2002: Distinguished graduate of the Air Force's Squadron Officer School
2008: Inducted into the Women in Aviation, International, Pioneer Hall of Fame
2019: Inducted into the National Women's Hall of Fame

== Promotion dates ==
Promotions
Insignia	Rank	Date
	Colonel	February 2015
	Lieutenant Colonel	January 2010
	Major	1 April 2006
	Captain	29 May 2000
	First Lieutenant	29 May 1998
	Second Lieutenant	29 May 1996
