= Muslims in the United States military =

Aspect of American military history

Muslim military personnel have served in all branches of the United States Armed Forces and in every major armed conflict to which the United States has been involved, including the War of 1812, the American Civil War, World War I, World War II, the Vietnam War, and others. According to the U.S. Department of Defense, as of 2015 there were currently 5,896 known Muslim Americans serving in the armed forces.

A number of Muslim American servicemen have gained fame due to their military service, and many have received awards and decorations for distinguished service, valor, or heroism.

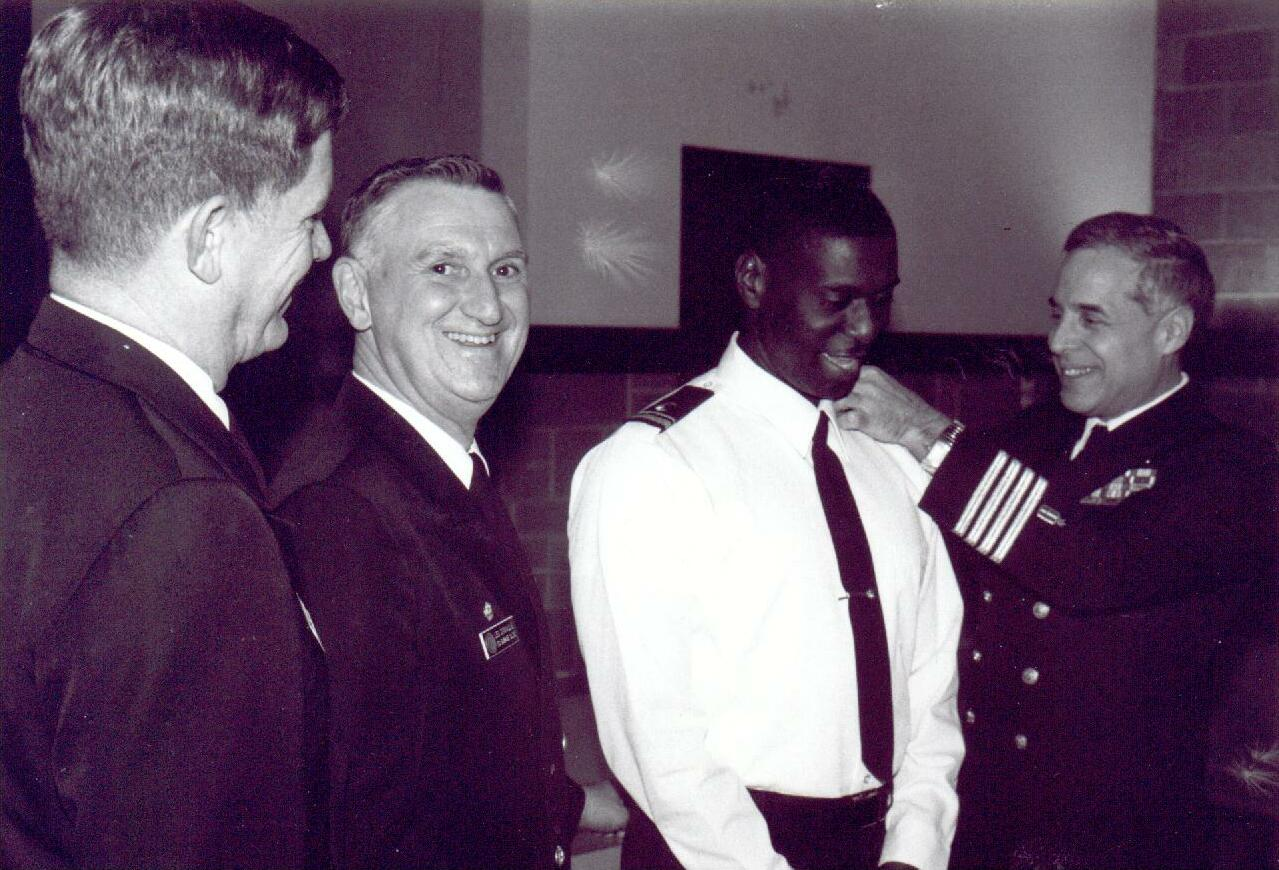
Frocking ceremony for U.S. Navy's first Muslim chaplain, when Navy (rabbi) Chaplain Arnold Resnicoff attaches new shoulder boards with Muslim Chaplain crescent insignia to uniform of Imam Monje Malak Abd al-Muta Noel Jr, 1996

== Participation in war ==
Muslims fought and died in both World War II and the Vietnam War. Some Muslim Americans served in World War II in North Africa, Europe, and Asia. Additionally, at least 12 Muslims are known to have died in the Vietnam War. Before the abolition of slavery in America, many African Muslim slaves fought for the Union.

=== War of 1812 ===
An African slave by the name of Bilali Muhammad defended Georgia's Sapelo Island from British attack during the War of 1812. His group consisted of 80 slaves who were mostly Muslim and were armed with muskets.

=== Civil War ===
291 Muslims are known to have fought during the Civil War. Some sources claim that the highest-ranking Muslim officer was Captain Moses Osman, the son of Robert and Catherine Osman. However, Moses Osman was confirmed in the Zion German Lutheran Church in 1843 in Harrisburg, Pennsylvania.

Nicholas Said, a Nigerian immigrant who was born a Muslim before converting to Christianity in 1855, enlisted in the 55th Massachusetts Colored Regiment of the United States Army and rose to the rank of sergeant. Another Muslim soldier from the Civil War was Max Hassan, an African who worked for the military as a porter.

Private Mohammed Kahn, an Afghan immigrant, was recorded as having been a practicing Muslim who read aloud from his Quran. He was wounded in multiple Civil War battles and received a pension in 1881.

=== After World War II ===
Abdullah Igram, a Muslim-American World War II veteran, campaigned for Islam to be an option in servicemembers' religious identification. His organization provided additional tags that soldiers were permitted to wear starting in 1953, and by then dog tags included codes for 'other' and 'prefer not to say'. By the Vietnam War, personnel could use a wide list of spelled-out religious names.

== 21st century ==
According to the Department of Homeland Security, a total of 6,024 Muslim-American troops served in overseas deployments in the ten years following 9/11, with 14 fatalities reported in Iraq. As of December 2015, there were approximately 5,897 active Muslim members of the US military, accounting for roughly 0.45% of total personnel. Because of military policies, practicing Muslim service members are required to shave off their beards and other facial hair and often face difficulties obtaining food that meets their dietary requirements. The involvement of Muslim Americans in the military received increased public attention following events such as the September 11 attacks, the 2009 Fort Hood shooting, and Khizr Khan's 2016 Democratic National Convention speech.

== Notable individuals ==
=== Humayun Khan ===
Humayun Khan was a Pakistani-American born in the United Arab Emirates on September 9, 1976, to Pakistani parents. After graduating from the University of Virginia in 2000, he joined the U.S. Army's 201st Forward Support Battalion, 1st Infantry Division. Throughout his four years of service, he rose in ranks to become an officer in the U.S. army before being killed by a car bomb on June 8, 2004, saving the lives of his fellow soldiers. President Donald Trump’s temporary immigration ban based on a list of terror-linked countries (created under the Obama administration) brought Khan's parents, Khizr and Ghazala Khan, into the public spotlight as they addressed Trump at the 2016 Democratic National Convention. Speaking out to defend their son and others who died in the American military, they created an "unexpected and potentially pivotal flash point in the general election".

=== Colonel Douglas Burpee ===
Colonel Douglas Burpee is a retired U.S. Marine, having flown helicopters for 27 years. Burpee was born an Episcopalian but converted to Islam when he was 19 in the late 1970s while attending the University of Southern California. He was accepted into the Officer Candidates' School in Quantico, VA, after graduation. At the end of his service, Burpee was the highest-ranking Muslim in the U.S. Marine Corps.

=== Corporal Kareem Khan ===
Corporal Kareem Rashad Sultan Khan was a Corporal in the US Army's 1st battalion Stryker Brigade Combat Team, having enlisted in 2005 and rising up the ranks. Khan was deployed to Iraq and in August 2007 was killed in Baqubah a town outside of Baghdad. He was killed in the process of clearing a house and posthumously awarded his rank and both the Bronze Star Medal and Purple Heart. He is buried at Arlington National Cemetery.

=== Brigadier General Cindy Saladin-Muhammad ===
Brigadier General Cindy Saladin-Muhammad became the first Muslim General Officer to serve in the U.S. military on July 3, 2024. Currently she is one of the highest-ranking Muslims serving in the U.S. military. In April 2024, BG Saladin-Muhammad assumed the role of Deputy Commanding General of the 807th Medical Command.

=== Brigadier General Shariful M. Khan ===
Brigadier General Shariful M. Khan became the first Bangladeshi-American to be a general in the U.S. military on June 30, 2025, later taking his oath on August 20, 2025. He was nominated for promotion alongside 54 other officers by President Trump, as stated by the Department of Defense on June 13, 2025. Khan serves as the director of staff for the Golden Dome for America at the Pentagon.

== Muslim American military insignia ==
The Army Chief of Chaplains requested on December 14, 1993, that an insignia be made to symbolize Muslim chaplains, and on January 8, 1994, a crescent-shaped design was produced.

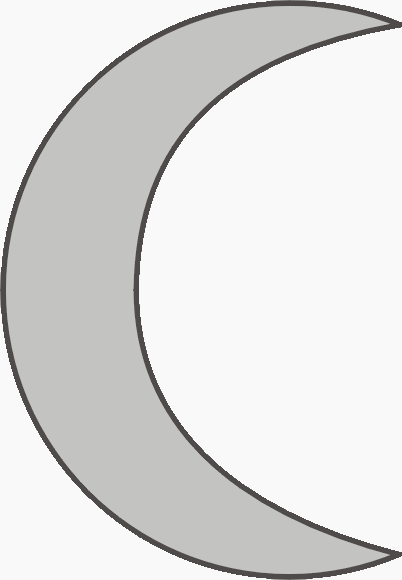
Muslim Chaplain insignia, Army

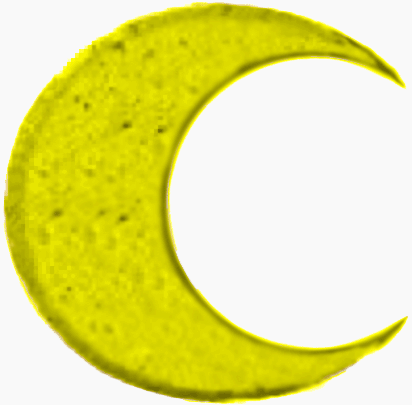
Muslim Chaplain insignia, Navy

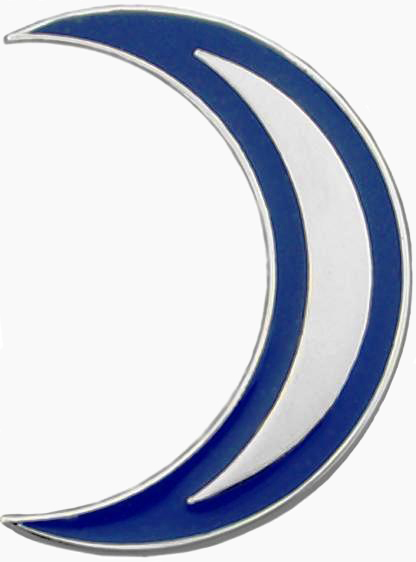
Muslim Chaplain insignia, Air Force

== See also ==
- United States Air Force Chaplain Corps
- United States Army Chaplain Corps
- United States Navy Chaplain Corps
