= Military of Puerto Rico =

Military defense of Puerto Rico

The military defense of Puerto Rico is the responsibility of the United States as part of the Treaty of Paris. Locally, Puerto Rico has its own National Guard, the Puerto Rico National Guard, and its own state defense force, the Puerto Rico State Guard, which, by local law, is under the authority of the Puerto Rico National Guard. The commander-in-chief of both forces is the governor of Puerto Rico, currently Jenniffer González-Colón, who delegates her authority to the Puerto Rico Adjutant General, currently Major General José J. Reyes. The Adjutant General, in turn, delegates authority over the State Guard to another officer, while retaining authority over the Puerto Rico National Guard as a whole. At the national level, the commander-in-chief is the President of the United States, currently Donald Trump.

A branch of the U.S. Army National Guard is stationed in Puerto Rico—known as the Puerto Rico Army National Guard—which performs missions equivalent to those of the Army National Guards of the different states of the United States, including ground defense, disaster relief, and control of civil unrest. The local National Guard also includes a branch of the U.S. Air National Guard—known as the Puerto Rico Air National Guard—which performs missions equivalent to those of the Air National Guards of the U.S. states.

== Military facilities in Puerto Rico ==
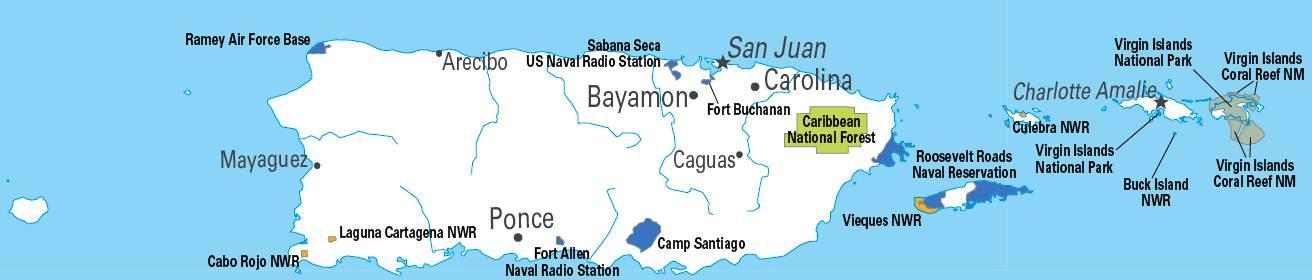

Currently Operational:

- Muñiz Air National Guard Base
- Camp Santiago
- Fort Buchanan
- Fort Allen (Puerto Rico)
- Roosevelt Roads Naval Station

Although the U.S. Air Force withdrew from Ramey Air Force Base in 1973, the facilities Aguadilla never closed. Today they operate activity as Rafael Hernandez international airport and coast guards air station Borinquen, maintaining helicopters and fixed wing aircraft in service. Likewise, Muniz Air National Guard Base in Carolina remains anc for the transit and deployment of U.S. Armed Forces aircraft.

On January 12, 1981, a group called the Boricua Popular Army, better known as Los Macheteros, claimed responsibility for blowing up six A-7 Corsair II aircraft at the Muñiz Air National Guard Base; a Puerto Rico Air National Guard base at a loss of $40 million. Responsibility for the air defense of Puerto Rico now rests with USAF or US Navy fighters that would be flown in, in the event of a military emergency.

At different times in the 20th century, the U.S. had about 25 military or naval installations in Puerto Rico, some very small ones, as well as large installations. The largest of these installations were the former Roosevelt Roads Naval Station in Ceiba, and the Atlantic Fleet Weapons Training Facility (AFWTF) on Vieques (all now closed except for Roosevelt Roads Naval Station), the National Guard training facility at Camp Santiago in Salinas, Fort Allen in Juana Diaz, the Army's Fort Buchanan in San Juan, the former U.S. Air Force Ramey Air Force Base in Aguadilla, and the Puerto Rico Air National Guard at Muñiz Air Force base in San Juan.

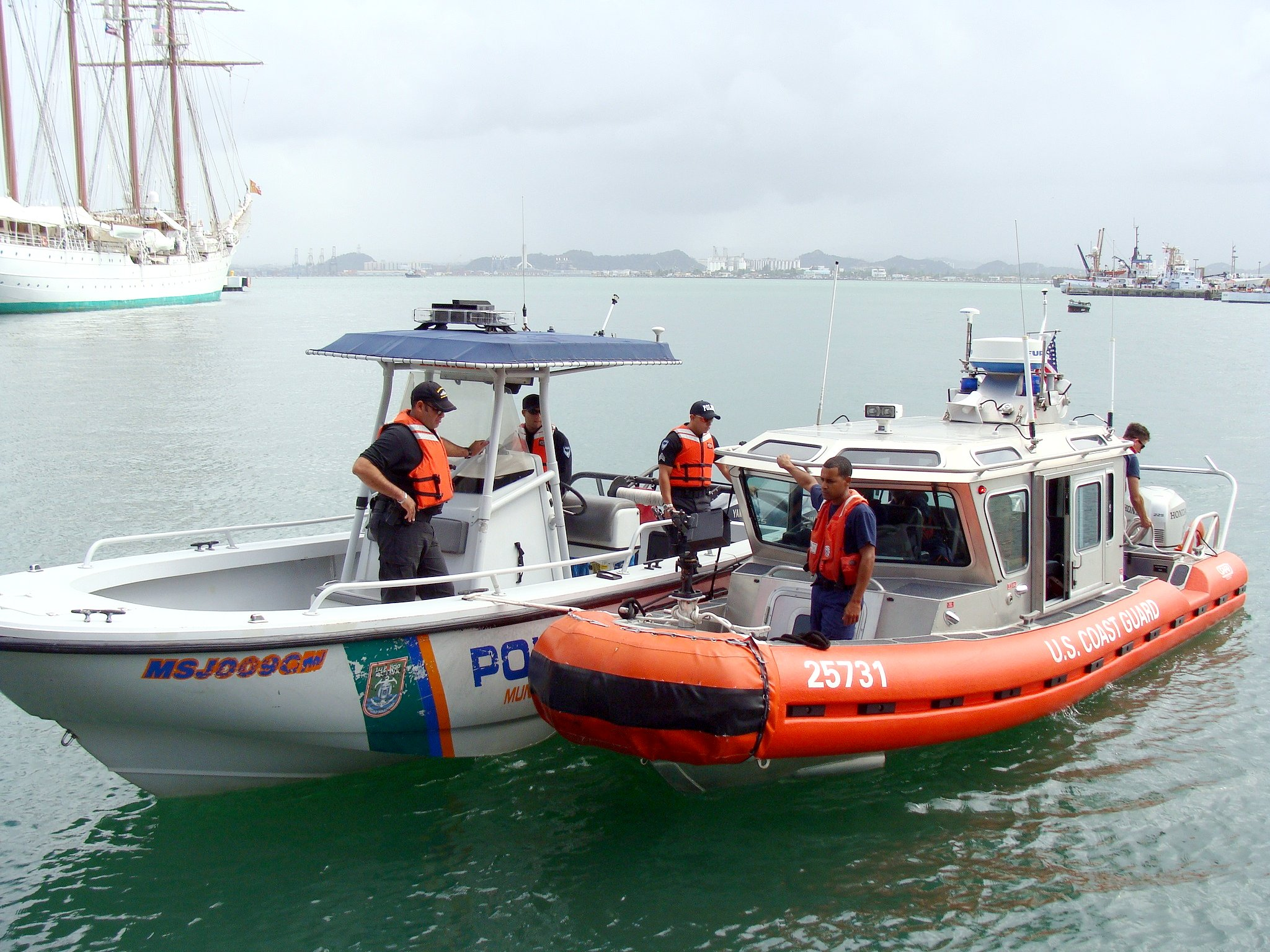
Puerto Rico Municipal Maritime Police - U.S. Coast Guard

The former U.S. Navy facilities at Roosevelt Roads, Vieques, and Sabana Seca have been deactivated and partially turned over to the local government. Other than U.S. Coast Guard and Puerto Rico National Guard facilities, there are only two remaining military installations in Puerto Rico, the U.S. Army's small Ft. Buchanan (supporting local veterans and reserve units) and the PRANG (Puerto Rico Air National Guard) Muñiz Air Base (the C-130 Fleet). In recent years, the U.S. Congress has considered their deactivations, but these have been opposed by diverse public and private entities in Puerto Rico - such as retired military who rely on Ft. Buchanan for the services available there.

The coastal defense of Puerto Rico is the responsibility of the U.S. Navy from ships at sea, and the U.S. Coast Guard.

The U.S. Coast Guard has a significant presence in Puerto Rico. Located on what was formerly Ramey Air Force Base, the Coast Guard maintains what is now referred to as "Coast Guard Air Station Borinquen". HH-65C helicopters operate out of Borinquen performing search-and-rescue as well as law-enforcement missions. On a continual basis, Coast Guard fixed-wing airplanes, such as the C-130 Hercules search-and-rescue plane, stationed primarily in Florida fly to Puerto Rico to support these missions.

U.S. Coast Guard cutters visit Puerto Rican waters periodically in their missions of coastal patrol and search-and-rescue. U.S. Navy ships visit Puerto Rican waters on an as-required basis, just like they visit all American waters, international oceans, and foreign ones, too.

On "La Puntilla" in Old San Juan the Coast Guard base its small, but capable surface fleet of several 110-foot (34 m) long cutters and other patrol boats. These boats and cutters work hand in hand with the air station responding to any mission that they may be called upon to perform.

== Military personnel in Puerto Rico ==
A significant number of Puerto Ricans participate as members and work for the U.S. Armed Forces, largely as National Guard members and civilian employees. The size of the overall military-related community in Puerto Rico is estimated to be 100,000 individuals. This includes retired personnel. Fort Buchanan has about 4,000 military and civilian personnel. In addition, approximately 17,000 people are members of the Puerto Rico Army and Puerto Rico Air National Guard, or the U.S. Reserve forces. Puerto Rican soldiers have served in every US military conflict from World War I to the current military engagement known by the United States and its allies as the War against Terrorism.

El Monumento de la Recordación

A number of Puerto Rican colleges and universities have the Reserve Officers' Training Corps (ROTC) programs. Army ROTC programs are offered at the American University of Puerto Rico, the Caribbean University, the University of Puerto Rico - Arecibo, the University of Puerto Rico – Bayamon Technological University College, the University of Puerto Rico – Carolina Regional College, the University of Puerto Rico - Cayey, the University of Puerto Rico - Mayagüez, and the University of Puerto Rico - Rio Piedras. Air Force ROTC programs are offered at the University of Puerto Rico - Bayamon Technological University College, the University of Puerto Rico - Mayagüez, and the University of Puerto Rico - Rio Piedras.

The U.S. Military has sought to form alliances with Hispanic organizations to promote military recruitment. In January 1999, leaders of National Hispanic organizations in collaboration with the U.S. Army held the Hispanic Leadership Summit '99. The "Education and Career Opportunities for Hispanic Youth in America's Army" summit included the participation of leaders of the US Army as well as leaders of national Hispanic organizations including ASPIRA, the Hispanic Association of Colleges and Universities (HACU), the League of United Latin American Citizens (LULAC), the National Association of Hispanic Publications (NAHP), the National Association of Latino Elected and Appointed Officials (NALEO), the National Council of La Raza (NCLR), SER jops for progress, and the members of the Congressional Hispanic Caucus. At the summit, the director of the LULAC National Educational Service Center (LNESC), Richard Royball commented, "Based on our mutually beneficial partnership, we would encourage other Hispanic organizations to ally themselves with the US Army." LNESC promotes military recruitment in educational service centers in several US cities and in Puerto Rico.

== Military and Naval uses of Puerto Rico ==
The US military installations in Puerto Rico are part of the US Northern Command (USNORTHCOM). USNORTHCOM has authority over all US military operations that take place throughout the Northern Area of Responsibility. US Fleet Forces Command has authority over all US Naval activity in the waters of the Caribbean. Air Forces North has authority over all US military flights and air operations over the Caribbean. Marine Forces North has authority over all USMC operations in the Caribbean, while US Army North has authority over all US Army operations in the Caribbean. US Special Operations North has authority over all special operations in the Caribbean. With the closing of the Roosevelt Roads and Vieques Island training facilities, the US Navy has basically exited from Puerto Rico, except for the ships that steam by, and the only significant military naval presence in the island is the U.S. Navy Reserve Naval Operational Support Center Puerto Rico (NOSC Puerto Rico) at Fort Buchanan, the Puerto Rican Army and Air National Guards. The U.S. Coast Guard maintains presence at Coast Guard Air Station Borinquen and Coast Guard Station San Juan.

The U.S. Navy's largest training area for the U.S. Atlantic Fleet used to be in Puerto Rico and in the Atlantic Ocean surrounding the island, but this was ended after President George W. Bush ordered the closure of the Roosevelt Roads Naval Station and the Vieques Island training grounds.

Through the years, the United States had conducted several military training exercises in Puerto Rico, the largest of these being Operation Springboard and Operation Readex. These exercises included thousands of personnel and involve air, sea, and land operations, and include training with live ammunition.

On top of training exercises, the US used Puerto Rico as a base to rehearse and launch military operations in Latin America and throughout the world. Operations launched from Puerto Rico include the 1954 intervention in Guatemala; the 1965 invasion of the Dominican Republic; the 1983 invasion of Grenada; the 1989 invasion of Panama; support of Salvadoran military; preparation for operation Desert Storm and Desert Fox in Iraq; and preparation for the War in Yugoslavia.

Near Aguada the United States Marine Corps operates an LF-transmitter with a 367.3 meters tall guyed mast, the tallest man-made object in the Caribbean area .

== See also ==
- Borinqueneers Congressional Gold Medal
- List of Puerto Rican military personnel
- Military history of Puerto Rico
- Puerto Rican Campaign
- Puerto Rican recipients of the Distinguished Service Cross
- Puerto Rican recipients of the Medal of Honor
- Puerto Rican recipients of the Navy Cross
- Puerto Rican women in the military
- Puerto Ricans in the Vietnam War
- Puerto Ricans in World War I
- Puerto Ricans in World War II
- Puerto Ricans Missing in Action in the Korean War
- Puerto Ricans Missing in Action in the Vietnam War
