= Anibal Irizarry =

Anibal Irizarry may refer to:

- Aníbal González Irizarry (1927–2018), Puerto Rican journalist
- Private Anibal Irizarry, Puerto Rican soldier, recipient of the Distinguished Service Cross during World War II
