= List of Puerto Rican Presidential Medal of Freedom recipients =

Puerto Rican recipients of the Presidential Medal of Freedom
- Presidential Medal of Freedom
- Presented by: President of the United States

This is a list of notable Puerto Ricans who were awarded the Presidential Medal of Freedom. The list includes people who were born in Puerto Rico, people who are of full or partial Puerto Rican ancestry such as Pablo Casals, whose mother was Puerto Rican and Chita Rivera, whose father was Puerto Rican. It also includes other residents or immigrants of other ethnic heritages who have made Puerto Rico their home, and who are recognized for their life or work.

Nine Puerto Ricans have been awarded the Presidential Medal of Freedom. The Presidential Medal of Freedom is an award bestowed by the President of the United States and is—along with the comparable Congressional Gold Medal bestowed by an act of U.S. Congress—the highest civilian award in the United States. It recognizes those individuals who have made "an especially meritorious contribution to the security or national interests of the United States, world peace, cultural or other significant public or private endeavors". Former governor Luis A. Ferré and his sister Isolina Ferré are the only pair of Puerto Rican brother and sister to have been awarded the Presidential Medal of Freedom. Baseball Hall of Famer Roberto Clemente was also the posthumous recipient of the Congressional Gold Medal and the Presidential Citizens Medal.

== Recipients of the Presidential Medal of Freedom ==
The following people are the recipients of the Presidential Medal of Freedom:

Name	Year awarded	Occupation
Pablo Casals (Puerto Rican mother)	1963	Cellist and Conductor
Luis Muñoz Marín	1963 (with Distinction)	Governor of Puerto Rico
Luis A. Ferré	1991	Governor of Puerto Rico
Antonia Pantojas	1996	Educator, social worker, feminist, civil rights leader
Isolina Ferré (sister of recipient Luis A. Ferré)	1999	Roman Catholic nun
Roberto Clemente (USMC picture)	2003 (posthumously)	Baseball Hall of Famer
Rita Moreno	2004	Actress
Chita Rivera	2009	Actress, dancer, and singer
Sylvia Mendez	2011	Civil Rights activist
Felicitas Mendez	2011 (posthumously)	Civil Rights activist

== See also ==
- List of Puerto Ricans
- List of Puerto Rican Presidential Citizens Medal recipients
- List of Presidential Medal of Freedom recipients
- List of volunteer awards
- Puerto Rican recipients of the Medal of Honor
- Puerto Rican recipients of the Navy Cross
- Puerto Rican recipients of the Distinguished Service Cross
- History of women in Puerto Rico
