= Helen Rodríguez Trías =

American pediatrician and activist (1929–2001)

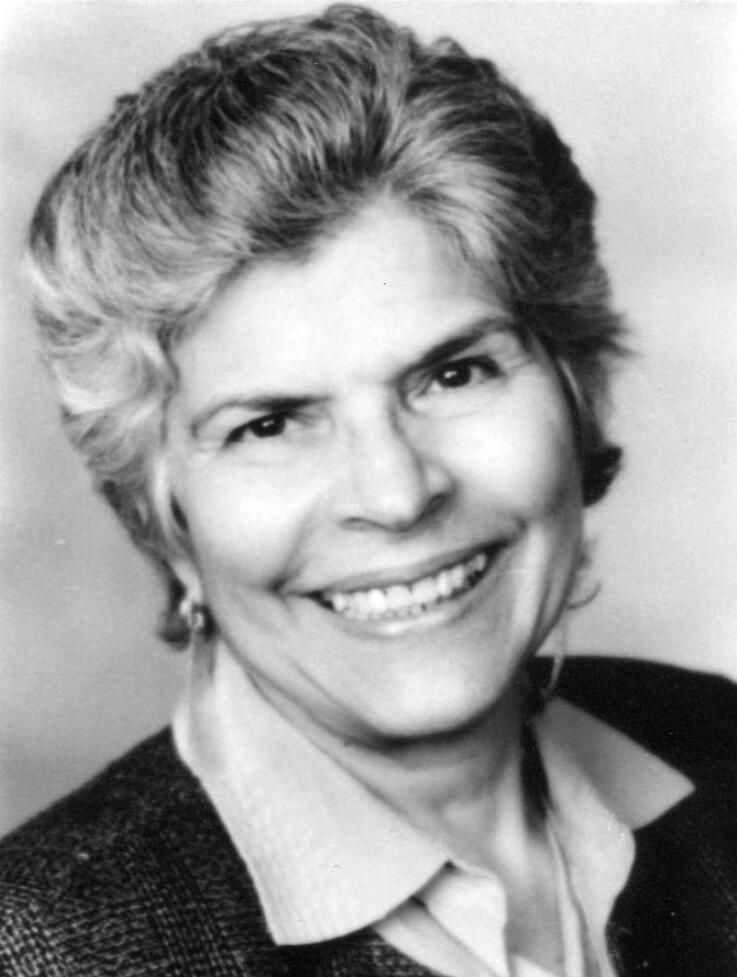
- The first Latina president of The American Public Health Association
- Born: July 7, 1929; New York City, U.S.
- Died: December 27, 2001 (aged 72); Santa Cruz, California, U.S.
- Occupations: Pediatrician, educator, activist
- Spouse: David Neumark Brainin (m. 1949-d.1954) Eliezer Curet (m. 1954-d. ?) Edward Gonzales (m. ?- 2001)
- Children: 4

Helen Rodríguez Trías (July 7, 1929 – December 27, 2001) was an American pediatrician, educator and women's rights activist. She was the first Latina president of the American Public Health Association (APHA), a founding member of the Women's Caucus of the APHA, and a recipient of the Presidential Citizens Medal. She is credited with helping to expand the range of public health services for women and children in minority and low-income populations around the world.

== Early years ==
Rodríguez Trías's parents had been living in New York during the early 20th century. After Rodríguez Trías's birth in 1929 on July 9th, her family moved back to Puerto Rico. Her family returned to New York once again when she was ten years old, where she experienced racism and discrimination. Even though she had received good grades in school and knew how to speak English, she was placed in a class with students with learning disabilities. It wasn't until she participated in a poem recital, her teacher realized that she was gifted and sent her to a class for gifted children. She later choose the medical career path because it "combined the things I loved the most, science and people."

== Education ==
In 1948, she began her academic education at the University of Puerto Rico in San Juan where she earned her BA degree. In 1957 she entered the University of Puerto Rico School of Medicine. She earned her medical degree in 1960, at the age of 31.

== Puerto Rican independence activist ==
Rodríguez Trías's mother was a school teacher in Puerto Rico. However, in New York, she was unable to get a teacher's license. Therefore, her mother had to take in boarders to meet her financial needs and pay the rent. After Rodríguez Trías graduated from high school, she decided she would like to study medicine and that her chances would be much better in Puerto Rico because the island had a good scholarship system.

University of Puerto Rico had a very strong independence movement and Rodríguez Trías became involved with the student faction of the Puerto Rican Nationalist Party. When Nationalist leader Don Pedro Albizu Campos had been invited to speak by the student council; the chancellor of the university, Jaime Rexach Benítez, did not permit Albizu access to the campus. The students consequently went on strike, with Rodríguez Trías amongst them, but her brother did not approve of this. She returned to New York after he threatened to cut off her college expenses.

In 1949, she got married and had three children with David Neumark Brainin. She then decided to return to Puerto Rico to pursue her degree. Returning to the University of Puerto Rico, she reinserted herself as a student activist on issues such as freedom of speech and Puerto Rican independence.

== Medical career ==
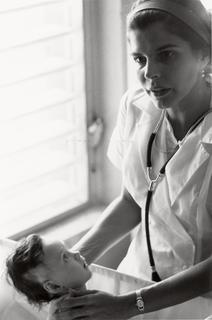
Rodríguez Trías taking care of a young child in a clinic

During her residency at the University Hospital in San Juan, she established the first center for the care of newborn babies in Puerto Rico. The hospital's death rate for newborns decreased 50 percent within three years. She established her medical practice in the field of pediatrics in the island after completing her residency. During this timeframe she divorced her second husband, Eliezer Curet, and in 1970 returned to New York. She said that her marriage and divorce helped her grow.

Rodríguez Trías headed the department of pediatrics at Lincoln Hospital in the South Bronx. At Lincoln Hospital, Rodríguez Trías lobbied to give all workers a voice in administrative and patient-care issues. She became involved with the Puerto Rican community and encouraged the health care workers at the hospital to become aware of the cultural issues and needs of the community. Rodríguez Trías was also an associate professor of medicine at Albert Einstein College of Medicine, Yeshiva University, and later taught at Columbia and Fordham universities.

== Advocate for women's rights ==
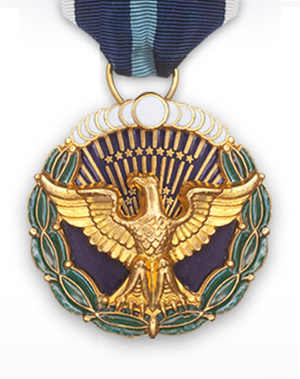
Awarded the Presidential Citizens Medal in 2001

Rodríguez Trías interest in women's rights began shortly after attending an abortion conference at Bernard College. She began to advocate for free abortions and for more widely available birth control for poorer women.

After attending the conference, during her years in Puerto Rico, Rodríguez Trías became aware of U.S. sterilization campaigns located there. During the 1960s and 1970s, many programs popped up around the United States, specifically targeting women of color (African Americans/Latinas) to perform non-consented sterilizations. This could happen as doctors would tie women's fallopian tubes postpartum without telling the patients what they had been doing.

The United States was also using Puerto Rico as a laboratory for the development of birth control technology. In 1970, she was a founding member of Committee to End Sterilization Abuse and in 1971 a founding member of the Women's Caucus of the American Public Health Association. She supported abortion rights, fought for the abolishment of enforced sterilization, and sought neonatal care for underserved people. In 1979, she became a founding member of the Committee for Abortion Rights and Against Sterilization Abuse and testified before the Department of Health, Education, and Welfare for passage of federal sterilization guidelines. She describes events at a 1974 Boston conference:

We had a panel on sterilization abuse, which had to do with disrespect for women's needs, wishes, and hopes. We brought up the Relf suit, brought on behalf of 2 Black, allegedly retarded girls, Minnie Lee Relf, age 12, and Mary Alice Relf, age 14, who had been sterilized without their knowledge or consent in a federally funded program in Montgomery, Alabama.

The guidelines, which she drafted, required a woman's written consent to sterilization in a language they could understand and set a waiting period between the consent and the sterilization procedure. She is credited with helping to expand the range of public health services for women and children in minority and low-income populations in the United States, Central and South America, Africa, Asia, and the Middle East.

In the 1980s, Rodríguez Trías served as medical director of the New York State Department of Health AIDS Institute. She worked on behalf of women from minority groups who were infected with HIV. In the 1990s, she served as health co-director of the Pacific Institute for Women's Health, a nonprofit research and advocacy group dedicated to improving women's well-being worldwide and focused on reproduction. She was a founding member of both the Women's Caucus and the Hispanic Caucus of the American Public Health Association (APHA) and the first Latina to serve as the president of the APHA.

== Later years ==
Rodríguez Trías once stated that her biggest inspiration came from "the experience of [her] own mother, aunts and sisters, who faced so many restraints in their struggle to flourish and realize their full potential." In addition to her mother, was Dr. Jose Sifontes, a professor at her medical school, who was a pioneer in pediatric tuberculosis. According to Rodríguez Trías, Dr. Jose Sifontes had great awareness that the events occurring in a community do affect the health of that community. These were some of the notable mentors who inspired Rodríguez Trías as she grew to become a huge contributor to the field of science.

On January 8, 2001, President Bill Clinton awarded Rodríguez Trías with the Presidential Citizen's Medal, the second-highest civilian award in the United States, for her work on behalf of women, children, people with HIV and AIDS, and poor people.

Rodriguez Trias died later that year, on December 27 due to lung cancer.

On July 7, 2018, which would have been Rodríguez Trías' 89th birthday, Google featured her in a Google Doodle in the United States, Puerto Rico, and Singapore.

In 2019, Chirlane McCray announced that New York City would build a statue honoring Rodríguez Trías in St. Mary's Park, near Lincoln Hospital in the Bronx.

Overall, Rodríguez Trías leaves behind a legacy that can be explained with her own words:

We need health, but above all we need to create a grounding for healthy public policy that redresses and salvages the growing inequities. We cannot achieve a healthier us without achieving a healthier, more equitable health care system, and ultimately, a more equitable society.

== See also ==
- History of women in Puerto Rico
- List of Puerto Ricans
- List of Puerto Rican scientists and inventors
- Puerto Rican Nationalist Party
- List of Puerto Rican Presidential Citizens Medal recipients
