= Victoria Leigh Soto =

American teacher and murder victim (1985–2012)

- Soto in March 2012
- Born: November 4, 1985; Bridgeport, Connecticut, U.S.
- Died: December 14, 2012 (aged 27); Newtown, Connecticut, U.S.
- Cause of death: Gunshot wounds (homicide)
- Resting place: Union Cemetery Stratford; Fairfield County, Connecticut
- Occupation: Teacher
- Known for: Heroism during the Sandy Hook Elementary School shooting
- Awards: Presidential Citizen's Medal (2013; awarded posthumously)

Victoria Leigh Soto (November 4, 1985 – December 14, 2012) was an American teacher who was killed in the Sandy Hook Elementary School shooting. After the gunman, Adam Lanza, entered the school, she hid her students in her classroom. When Lanza entered Soto's classroom, Soto claimed that the students were in the gym room. Lanza then shot Soto, causing the students to run from their hiding places. She was reportedly shot four times by Lanza and died trying to shield them with her body. She has since been hailed as a hero. She is a posthumous recipient of the Presidential Citizens Medal.

Plans and petitions to honor her by name via scholarships, roads, and schools were announced in late 2012 and 2013. The Stratford Town Council unanimously approved a resolution to name a school after Soto, which opened in 2015, and the city of Bayamón, Puerto Rico, birthplace of Soto's father, is planning to name a public facility after her.

== Early life ==
Soto was born in Bridgeport, Connecticut, to Carlos Soto, a native of Bayamón, Puerto Rico, and Donna Fagan-Soto, of Irish-American descent. Her father worked for the Connecticut Department of Transportation as a crane operator and her mother was a nurse at Bridgeport Hospital. Her family moved to Stratford, Connecticut, and she graduated from Stratford High School in 2003. In 2008, she earned bachelor's degrees in both education and history as a Dean's List student at Eastern Connecticut State University. She then enrolled in graduate school at Southern Connecticut State University.

== Death ==
On December 14, 2012, while Soto was teaching her first-grade class at Sandy Hook Elementary School, Adam Lanza made his way into the school, and began to shoot staff and students. After killing fourteen students and two teachers in the first classroom, Lanza entered her classroom. Media reports state that Soto had hidden several children in a closet, and when Lanza entered her classroom, Soto told him that the children were not there and that they were in the school gym. When several children ran from their hiding places, Lanza began shooting at the students. Soto was reportedly shot trying to shield them with her body. A photograph of Soto's sister awaiting news of her sister on her cell phone was taken by Associated Press photographer Jessica Hill and widely reproduced across the globe. Some news outlets labeled the photograph "iconic" and said that it had come to symbolize the tragedy.

== Funeral ==
A memorial service was held on December 15, and funeral services took place on December 19 at the Lordship Community Church. American musician and songwriter Paul Simon performed at the funeral services and sang "The Sound of Silence". On December 20, she was interred at Union Cemetery Stratford, Fairfield County, Connecticut. The Connecticut State Police honor guard saluted Soto's hearse en route.

== Legacy ==
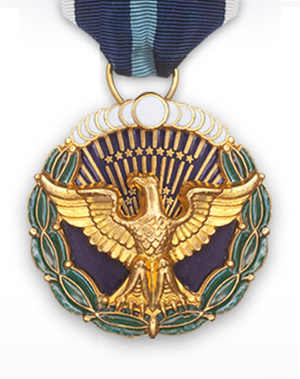
Awarded posthumously the Presidential Citizens Medal in 2012

In 2012, Eastern Connecticut State University created the Victoria Leigh Soto Endowed Memorial Scholarship Fund, awarded to students aiming to become teachers.

In 2012, the Town of Stratford renamed North Parade, adjacent to town hall, "Victoria Soto Way".

In December 2012, the Stratford High School Class of 2003 established the "Victoria L. Soto Memorial Fund" in her honor. The fund helped pay for funeral services, the creation of a memorial at Stratford High School, and a scholarship fund in the name of Soto, who had belonged to the class of 2003.

In 2013, Acero Victoria Soto High School opened in Chicago, Illinois. The school is a public charter school with grades 9-12.

On February 15, 2013, Soto and the other five adults who were killed were posthumously awarded the Presidential Citizens Medal. The medal honors Americans who have performed "exemplary deeds of service" for their country or fellow citizens. The medal, the government's second-highest civilian award, was presented to the families of the victims by President Barack Obama at a White House ceremony.

The Nutmeg Big Brothers Big Sisters organization created the "Victoria Soto Volunteer Award" in honor of Soto, who was a former Nutmeg mentor.

In June 2013, a playground in Long Brook Park in Stratford was named the "Victoria Soto Memorial Playground" in her honor.

In 2015, Victoria Soto Elementary School opened in Stratford. The school serves students from pre-kindergarten through second grade.

The city of Bridgeport holds an annual Vicki Soto 5K race.

== See also ==
- List of Irish Americans
- List of Puerto Ricans
- List of Puerto Rican Presidential Citizens Medal recipients
