= Puerto Rican recipients of the Navy Cross =

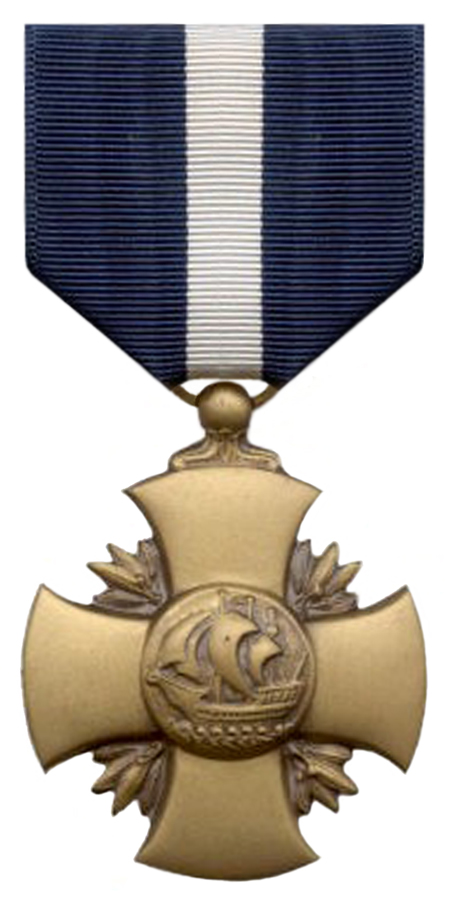
Navy Cross

Puerto Ricans have served as members of the United States Armed Forces and have fought in every major conflict in which the United States has been involved from World War I onward. Many Puerto Ricans, including those of Puerto Rican descent, have distinguished themselves during combat as members of the five branches of the U.S. Military, the Army, Marines, Navy, Air Force and the Coast Guard.

Nine Puerto Ricans have been awarded the United States' highest military decoration – the Medal of Honor, seven have been awarded the Navy Cross and nineteen have been awarded the Distinguished Service Cross (four of which were upgraded to the Medal of Honor on March 18, 2014.).

The Navy Cross is the second highest medal that can be awarded by the U.S. Navy and are awarded to members of the U.S. Navy or U.S. Marine Corps for heroism or distinguished service. The following is a list of the seven Puerto Ricans awarded the Navy Cross with their citations. On August 2, 1917, Lieutenant Frederick L. Riefkohl of the US Navy became the first known Puerto Rican to be awarded the Navy Cross.

== World War I ==
=== Frederick Lois Riefkohl ===
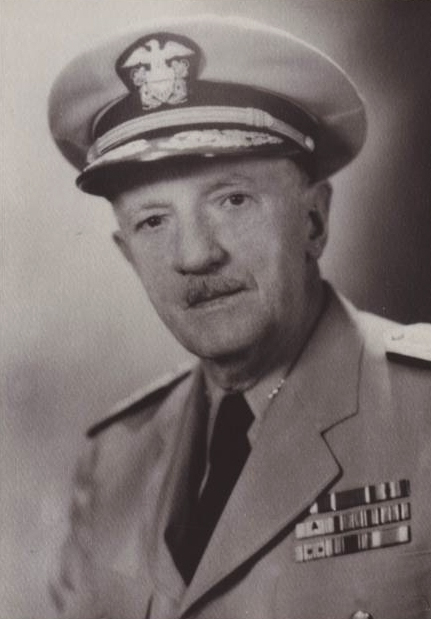

Rear Admiral Frederick Lois Riefkohl U.S. Navy, retired (February 27, 1889 – September 1969), a native of Maunabo, Puerto Rico was the first Puerto Rican to graduate from the United States Naval Academy. He became the first Puerto Rican to be awarded the Navy Cross Medal when in World War I, Riefkohl as a lieutenant aboard the U.S.S. Philadelphia, was engaged in combat action against an enemy submarine. Navy Cross Citation:

Frederick L. Riefkohl
Lieutenant, U.S. Navy
Armed Guard, U.S.S. Philadelphia
Date of Action:August 2, 1917
Citation:

The Navy Cross is awarded to Lieutenant Frederick L. Riefkohl, U.S. Navy, for distinguished service in the line of his profession as Commander of the Armed Guard of the U.S.S. Philadelphia, and in an engagement with an enemy submarine. On August 2, 1917, a periscope was sighted, and then a torpedo passed under the stern of the ship. A shot was fired, which struck close to the submarine, which then disappeared.

Postscript: Rear Admiral Frederick Lois Riefkohl served as Captain of the USS Vincennes during World War II.

== 2nd Nicaraguan Campaign ==
=== Rafel Toro ===
Private Rafel Toro* (died July 25, 1927), born in Humacao, Puerto Rico, was a member of the United States Marine Corps who served in the 2nd Nicaraguan Campaign during the Banana Wars He was posthumously awarded the Navy Cross.

Navy Cross Citation:

RAFEL TORO
Private, U.S. Marine Corps
Guardia Nacional de Nicaragua
Date of Action: July 25, 1927
Citation:

The Navy Cross is presented to Rafel Toro, Private, U.S. Marine Corps, for extraordinary heroism in battle when on the occasion of an engagement at San Fernando, Nicaragua, 25 July 1927, during an insurrection in that country, while performing advance guard duty in an important expedition into Nueva Segovia, Private Toro, accompanying his commanding officer, rode ahead into the town and on being attacked, fearlessly proceeded against tremendous odds, returning the fire, and at the risk of his own life materially assisted in holding the enemy in check until the arrival of reinforcements. Although receiving wounds at this time, which later resulted in his death, Private Toro continued in the fight to the last displaying that type of grit, determination and courage which characterizes conduct above and beyond the call of duty. Authority – USMC Communiqué: 205227 ACE-jfb (21 December 1927) Born: at Humacao, Puerto Rico Home Town: Humacao, Puerto Rico

Postscript: Toro was part of the U.S. Marine Corps occupation force in Nicaragua. On July 25, 1927, Private Toro was on advance guard duty into Nueva Segovia. As he rode into town, he was attacked; returning fire, he was able to hold back the enemy until reinforcements arrived. He was mortally wounded in this action for which he was posthumously awarded the Navy Cross. On May 28, 2007 — Memorial Day — Senator Kenneth McClintock, President of the Senate of Puerto Rico, along with Puerto Rico National Guard Adjutant General Colonel David Carrión, unveiled the names of Puerto Rican military heroes most recently added to "El Monumento de la Recordación" (the Monument of Remembrance). Among those newly honored were Rafel Toro, Manuel Rivera Jr. and Medal of Honor recipient Humbert Roque Versace. The monument, which honors Puerto Rico's fallen military, is located in front of the Capitol Building in San Juan, Puerto Rico.

== Korean War ==
=== Ramón Núñez-Juárez ===
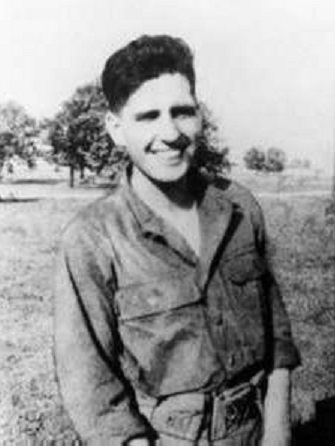

PFC. Ramón Núñez-Juárez* (October 6, 1932 – September 8, 1952), born in San Sebastián, Puerto Rico was a member of the United States Marine Corps. He was listed as Missing in Action during the Korean War and was posthumously awarded the Navy Cross.

Navy Cross Citation:

RAMON NUNEZ-JUAREZ (MIA)
Citation:

The Navy Cross is presented to Ramon Nunez-Juarez (1240152), Private First Class, U.S. Marine Corps, for extraordinary heroism in connection with military operations against an armed enemy of the United Nations while serving as an Automatic Rifleman of Company E, Second Battalion, First Marines, First Marine Division (Reinforced), in action against enemy aggressor forces in the Republic of Korea on 9 August 1952. With his squad's position on a vitally important hill encircled and attacked from three sides by a numerically superior enemy force following an intense hostile artillery and mortar barrage, Private First Class Nunez- Juarez fearlessly remained in his forward position and delivered effective rifle fire which greatly aided in halting the attackers. When his supply of ammunition was expended, he unhesitatingly left his fighting position and crawled down the slope to acquire a re-supply from one of his comrades. Unable to return to his original position, he quickly set up his weapon at an alternate point near the crest of the hill and continued to deliver devastating fire upon the enemy. Aware that his squad was unable to evacuate its casualties without covering fire, he gallantly held his commanding ground when the order to withdraw was given and poured accurate fire on the hostile force to enable his unit to withdraw to a safe position. By his indomitable fighting spirit, courageous initiative and resolute determination in the face of overwhelming odds, Private First Class Nunez-Juarez served to inspire all who observed him and contributed in large measure to the successful withdrawal of his entire squad. His great personal valor reflects the highest credit upon himself and enhances the finest traditions of the United States Naval Service. Authority: Board Serial 1022 (December 1, 1953) Born: 5/25/1931 at San Sebastián, Puerto Rico Home Town: San Sebastián, Puerto Rico

Núñez-Juárez was born in San Sebastián, Puerto Rico, where he received his primary and secondary education. In 1952, Núñez-Juárez was inducted into the Marines in San Juan, the island's capital, and reported to Marine Corps Recruit Depot Parris Island, South Carolina. After he graduated from his basic training, he was sent to Camp Lejeune in North Carolina where he underwent advanced training before being sent to Korea. He was assigned as an automatic rifleman to Company E of the 2nd Battalion, 1st Marines (2/1), 1st Marine Division.

The 1st Marine Division was stationed in the eastern part of Korea when in early spring of 1952 it was ordered to move to defend the western sector. The sector, which was 15 miles (24 km) long and stretched all the way to the Samichon River, was a section of the 8th Army's Main Line of Resistance (MLR) known as the Jamestown Line.

On August 8, 1952, E Company, 2/1, began taking incoming mortar and artillery rounds from the Communist Chinese Army's 63rd and 65th armies. A company-size Chinese Communist Force (CCF) struck Outpost Siberia, which was manned by PFC Ramón Núñez-Juárez and a squad of 15 men. Núñez-Juárez and the other the riflemen fought off the enemy for nearly half an hour before withdrawing from their position.

Núñez-Juárez, manning a Browning Automatic Rifle (BAR), was able to halt the enemy's advance long enough for the remainder of his squad to escape. Núñez-Juárez was struck by enemy gunfire and died as a result of his wounds. For the next several days the Marines tried to retake Outpost Siberia, but were unable to do so. Núñez-Juárez was listed as Missing in Action and was posthumously awarded the Navy Cross for his heroic actions.

Postscript: PFC Ramón Núñez-Juárez's remains have never been recovered and a symbolic burial with full military honors was held on October 25, 1970. There is a headstone with his name inscribed above an empty grave in the Puerto Rico National Cemetery, located in Bayamon, Puerto Rico. His name is inscribed in El Monumento de la Recordación, a monument dedicated to the Puerto Ricans who have fallen in combat, located in San Juan, Puerto Rico.

=== Enrique Romero-Nieves ===
PFC Enrique Romero-Nieves (died October 26, 1952) born in Culebra, Puerto Rico, was a member of the United States Marine Corps who served in the Korean War. He was posthumously awarded the Navy Cross.

Navy Cross Citation:

ENRIQUE ROMERO-NIEVES
Citation:

The Navy Cross is presented to Enrique Romero-Nieves (1240226), Private First Class, U.S. Marine Corps, for extraordinary heroism in connection with military operations against an armed enemy of the United Nations while serving as a Squad Leader of Company A, First Battalion, Seventh Marines, First Marine Division (Reinforced), in action against enemy aggressor forces in the Republic of Korea on 26 October 1952. When both the platoon commander and sergeant were wounded and evacuated during his platoon's night counterattack against a bitterly defended hill mass which had been overrun by the enemy a few hours before, Private First Class Romero-Nieves unhesitatingly continued the attack in the face of intense artillery, mortar, automatic-weapons and grenade fire and skillfully directed the emplacement of a machine gun within seventy-five yards of the hostile position to increase the volume of covering and supporting fire fore the final assault on an enemy bunker. Armed only with hand grenades, he single-handedly charged the bunker and, although knocked down and painfully wounded by an enemy grenade, which rendered his left arm useless, quickly regained his feet and again stormed the bunker. Unable to pull the bin of a grenade with his wounded left hand, he coolly extracted the pin by hooking it in his belt buckle and hurled the deadly missile into the bunker, killing six of the enemy and enabling his comrades to continue in the assault. His intrepid fighting spirit, resolute determination and courageous initiative were contributing factors in the recapture of the platoon's objective and reflect the highest credit upon Private First Class Romero-Nieves and the United States Naval Service. Authority: Board Serial 423 (June 1, 1953) Born: at Culebra, Puerto Rico

Postscript:

== Vietnam War ==
=== Angel Mendez ===
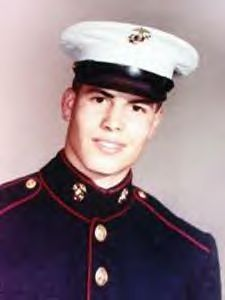

Sergeant Angel Mendez* (August 8, 1946 – March 16, 1967), born in New York City, New York to Puerto Rican parents was a member of the United States Marine Corps that belonged to Company F, 2nd Battalion, 7th Marines, 1st Marine Division. Despite being mortally wounded, Sgt. Mendez, covered his platoon commander with his body and carried him to safety. He was posthumously awarded the Navy Cross.

Navy Cross Citation:

ANGEL MENDEZ
Sergeant, U.S. Marine Corps
Company F, 2d Battalion, 7th Marines, 1st Marine Division (Rein.) FMF
Citation:

The Navy Cross is presented to Angel Mendez, Sergeant, U.S. Marine Corps, for extraordinary heroism while serving as the Platoon Guide of the Third Platoon, Company F, Second Battalion, Seventh Marines, First Marine Division (Reinforced), Fleet Marine Force, in the Republic of Vietnam on 16 March 1967. During Operation DE SOTO in Quang Ngai Province, Company F was conducting a search and destroy mission when the rear elements of the company were taken under intense 50-caliber machine gun and automatic weapons fire from an estimated hard-core Viet Cong battalion. One half of the Second Platoon was pinned-down in an open rice paddy and all attempts to relieve the pressure on the beleaguered Marines had proven futile. Sergeant (then Corporal) Mendez, unhesitatingly volunteered to lead a squad into the face of the devastating and extremely accurate machine gun fire to assist the pinned-down Marines in returning to friendly lines with their two dead and two seriously wounded. The Viet Cong fire increased to a fever pitch as Sergeant Mendez calmly and courageously moved out onto a paddy dike, completely exposed to the intense fire, and commenced firing his M-79 at the enemy positions with deadly accuracy. He fired round after round as he stood, bravely defying the enemy, to give covering fire to his comrades. Sixty meters across the rice paddy from Sergeant Mendez, his Platoon Commander was seriously wounded and he fell, unable to move. Immediately Sergeant Mendez raced through the hail of bullets to his Platoon Commander's side. Shielding him with his body as he applied a dressing to the wound, he picked up the Lieutenant and started to carry him to friendly lines, which were more than seventy-five meters away. Exhibiting exceptional courage he moved toward the lines as the Viet Cong attempted to hit this double target. Twenty meters short of his goal, he was hit in the shoulder and two of his comrades ran out to assist him. Even though painfully wounded, Sergeant Mendez chose to be the rear man, refusing to relinquish his hold on his Lieutenant's legs as they carried him toward the hedgerow. He was shielding his Lieutenant with his own body when he was mortally wounded. By his dauntless courage, initiative and selfless efforts in behalf of another, Sergeant Mendez saved his platoon commander's life and upheld the highest traditions of the Marine Corps and the United States Naval Service. He gallantly gave his life for his country. Authority: Navy Department Board of Decorations and Medals Home Town: New York, New York

Mendez' parents were Antonio Méndez Pomales, a native of Fajardo and Martina Rivera García from Naguabo. They moved from Puerto Rico to New York City seeking a better life. His father owned and attended a grocery store in the South Bronx while his mother cared for their eight children at home. When Mendez' mother became ill and the family's economic situation worsened, his father could not raise him and his siblings, therefore 2 were sent to foster homes and 6 were placed in the Mission of the Immaculate Virgin, an orphanage on Mount Loretto, Staten Island. There he received his primary and secondary education. Mendez was a member of the cadet corps along with his brothers and many of the "Mount" kids. At a young age, he became fascinated with military life and with his friends would often imagine that he was on a "patrol" while camping at Stokes State Forest and Worthington State Forest.

In 1964, he volunteered to join the Marine Corps right after graduating from high school. Mendez received his basic training at Marine Corps Recruit Depot Parris Island, South Carolina. After he graduated from his recruit training, he was sent to Marine Corps Base Camp Lejeune, North Carolina to attend the School of Infantry. Mendez was assigned to Delta Company, 1st Battalion, 26th Marine Regiment, 1st Marine Division.

Operation Desoto

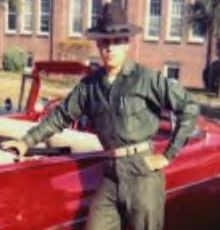
Cpl. Angel Mendez (1966)

Upon his deployment to South Vietnam, Mendez was assigned to Company F, 2nd Battalion, 7th Marines, 1st Marine Division.

Operation Desoto, was initiated on 27 January 1967 in the Đức Phổ District of Quảng Ngãi Province. The 2nd Battalion 7th Marines was part of the Special Landing Force (SLF) and took part in operations throughout the Marines Corps area of responsibility and saw extensive action throughout the 4-month-long operation. The 7th Marines, with elements of the 5th Marine Regiment, bore the brunt of most of the patrolling and contact with the enemy, whose presence continued in Chu Lai.

On March 16, 1967, Mendez was conducting a Search and destroy mission with his company when they came under attack from a Viet Cong battalion. Half of his platoon was pinned down in a rice paddy under enemy fire, and Mendez volunteered to lead a squad to assist the pinned-down Marines in returning to friendly lines with their two dead and two seriously wounded men. Mendez exposed himself while returning fire with his M79 grenade launcher on the enemy. His Platoon Commander, Lieutenant Ronald D. Castille was seriously wounded and he fell, unable to move. Using his own body, Mendez shielded Lt. Castille as he applied a dressing to the wound, he then picked up the Lieutenant and started to carry him to friendly lines, which were more than seventy-five meters away. Mendez was hit in the shoulder and two of his comrades rushed to help him with their commander, Mendez however refused to let go of his platoon commander and chose to act as rear man. Mendez continued to shield his lieutenant with his own body until he was mortally wounded. Mendez was posthumously awarded the Navy Cross and promoted to sergeant.

Postscript:

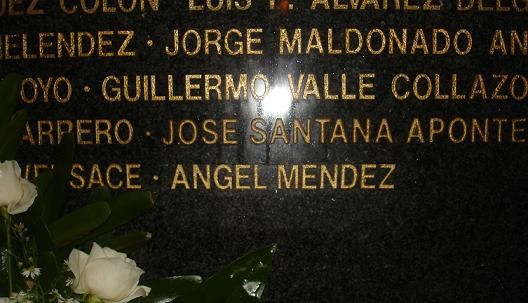
The inscription of the name of Angel Mendez in "El Monumento de la Recordación"

In March 1967, Mendez's body was sent to Puerto Rico for funeral services upon the request of his father. Mendez's siblings believed that their brother should be buried in New York and two weeks later, his body was sent to Staten Island where he was buried with full military honors on the grounds of the mission where he grew up at Mount Loretto. He was survived by his parents and his siblings, Ismael, Edwin, Carmen, Anibal, Maria, Betty and Anthony. The name of Angel Mendez is inscribed on the Vietnam Veterans Memorial ("The Wall") on Panel 16E – Line 94.

Senator Charles Schumer, senior U.S. Senator from the state of New York prompted by the men of the Island's Marine Corps League detachment and supported by the man whom Mendez saved, the Honorable Ronald D. Castille, former district attorney of Philadelphia and now Chief Justice of Pennsylvania, are calling for Mendez to be recognized with the highest military honor of the United States, the Medal of Honor.

The request lacked some vital information and in 2003, a meeting was held in Mt. Loretto, by Mr. Al Richichi, President and the Board of managers of the Mt. Loretto Alumni Association, Bruce W. Barraclough, Sr., John C. Gallo and Ismael Mendez and his wife Aida Mendez next of kin to Angel Mendez. This meeting was held to bring those involved up to date on the intentions of Barraclough and Gallo quest to honor Angel Mendez, and to get the family's permission to submit a new request for the Medal of Honor. In October, 2003 Barraclough and Gallo had finished writing up the new request which had presented only the facts, and added a petition signed by many organizations, Society's, along with many signatures from Staten Island, New Yorkers.

On January 14, 2008, the Honorable Ronald D. Castille was sworn in as Chief Justice of Pennsylvania. In his speech he is quoted as saying the following:

"I remember my Platoon Sgt. Angel Mendez, a Marine who was raised in an orphanage in Staten Island and who called the Marine Corps his family. It was Sgt. Mendez who braved heavy enemy machine gun fire to pull me to safety as I lay wounded in that rice paddy in Vietnam at Duc Pho while leading my own Marines in an effort to bring in other wounded and fallen Marines to safety in Operation DeSoto. Angel saved my life that day, but he was mortally wounded and was posthumously awarded the Navy Cross, the second highest medal awarded by the Marine Corps for personal bravery. NY Senator Charles Schumer is now leading an effort to upgrade Angel's Navy Cross to the Medal of Honor."

On May 26, 2008 during the Memorial Day celebrations held in San Juan, Puerto Rico, the inscription of the name of Angel Mendez in "El Monumento de la Recordación" (Monument of Remembrance) was unveiled. The monument is dedicated to Puerto Rico's fallen military members and situated in front of the Capitol Building. The unveiling was done by then Puerto Rico Senate President Kenneth McClintock and PR National Guard Adjutant General Col. David Carrión.

A bill (H.R. 2422), that would permit the naming of a Staten Island Post Office, located at 45 Bay Street, after Mendez was approved by the US House of Representatives on November 14, 2011. The bill was introduced by US Congressman Michael G. Grimm, representative of New York's 13th District, and cosponsored by every House member of the New York congressional delegation. The Bill was signed off on legislation by President Obama and the St. George Post Office was renamed and will be known as the "Sergeant Angel Mendez Post Office."

=== José L. Rivera ===
Lance Corporal José L. Rivera born in Ciales, Puerto Rico, was a member of the United States Marine Corps. He belonged to Company L, Third Battalion, 5th Marines, 1st Marine Division (Reinforced), Fleet Marine Force. His parents moved from Puerto Rico to the United States and settled in Waukegan, Illinois. When the enemy forces threw a grenade at his position, he covered it with his helmet and smothered the explosion with his own body, thereby saving the lives of his comrades.

Navy Cross Citation:

JOSE L. RIVERA
Lance Corporal, U.S. Marine Corps
Company L, Third Battalion, Fifth Marines, FIRST Marine Division (Reinforced), Fleet Marine Force
Citation:

The President of the United States of America takes pleasure in presenting the Navy Cross to Lance Corporal Jose L. Rivera (MCSN: 2447515), United States Marine Corps, for extraordinary heroism while serving as a Fire Team Leader with Company L, Third Battalion, Fifth Marines, FIRST Marine Division (Reinforced), Fleet Marine Force, in connection with combat operations against the enemy in the Republic of Vietnam. On the night of 26 March 1969, Lance Corporal Rivera and six other Marines from Company L were occupying a listening post approximately 100 yards forward of the company perimeter in Quang Nam Province. Suddenly, the Marines came under a heavy ground attack by a numerically superior enemy force. Lance Corporal Rivera was attempting to alert the company by radio when a hostile hand grenade landed in his position. Without hesitation, he covered the grenade with his helmet and two protective vests and, shouting a warning to his comrades, smothered the explosion with his own body. Although suffering from multiple fragmentation wounds, he ignored his painful injuries and commenced delivering accurate fire at the assaulting enemy, resolutely refusing to leave his position until his comrades had reached friendly lines. His heroic and timely actions and sincere concern for the welfare of his fellowmen inspired all who observed him and were instrumental in saving the lives of several Marines. By his courage, aggressive determination and unswerving devotion to duty in the face of extreme personal danger, Lance Corporal Rivera contributed significantly to the subsequent defeat of the enemy force and upheld the highest traditions of the Marine Corps and of the United States Naval Service. General Orders: Authority: Navy Department Board of Decorations and Medals

Postscript:

=== Miguel Rivera-Sotomayor ===
Corporal Miguel Rivera-Sotomayor born in Philadelphia, Pennsylvania. to Puerto Rican parents, was a member of the United States Marine Corps. He belonged to Company F, 2nd Battalion, 9th Marines, 3rd Marine Division. Silenced enemy machine guns and allowed his platoon to move from its pinned down position to establish an effective base of fire against the enemy.

Navy Cross Citation:

MIGUEL RIVERA-SOTOMAYOR
Corporal, U.S. Marine Corps
Company F, 2d Battalion, 9th Marines, 3rd Marine Division (Rein.)
Citation:

The President of the United States of America takes pleasure in presenting the Navy Cross to Corporal Miguel A. Rivera-Sotomayor (MCSN: 2174861), United States Marine Corps, for extraordinary heroism while serving as a Grenadier with Company F, Second Battalion, Ninth Marines, THIRD Marine Division (Reinforced), Fleet Marine Force, in Quang Tri Province, Republic of Vietnam, on 29 July 1967. While moving in a battalion-sized operation in connection with Operation KINGFISHER, the entire battalion was attacked by a large element of the North Vietnamese army and began receiving a heavy barrage of mortar, rocket and automatic weapons fire. The Third Platoon of Company F, called to the front of the battle, was pinned down in a heavy cross fire from enemy machine guns. Receiving a call, for his support, Corporal Rivera-Sotomayor responded immediately, though he had been painfully wounded in the arm by shrapnel earlier in the battle. Rushing out into the direct line of enemy fire, with utter disregard for his own safety, he fired his complete supply of ammunition. His firing was so effective that it completely silenced the enemy machine guns and allowed his platoon to move from its pinned down position to establish an effective base of fire against the enemy. With his ammunition expended, Corporal Rivera-Sotomayor observed a machine-gun team whose members were too seriously wounded to fire their gun. Running across the opening in which he was standing, through intensifying enemy automatic rifle fire, he quickly loaded it and again, with no thought of his intense pain or severe wound, stood up with the gun and fired several rounds. Observing that the enemy was shifting positions, he grabbed a rifle and struggling into the open from his covered position, he fired a complete magazine of ammunition. Returning as quickly as possible for another magazine, he had to be restrained by a Corpsman from going out again. By his daring actions and loyal devotion to duty in the face of personal risk, Corporal Rivera-Sotomayor upheld the highest traditions of the Marine Corps and the United States Naval Service. Authority: Navy Department Board of Decorations and Medals

Postscript:

== El Monumento de la Recordación ==
El Monumento de la Recordación

The names of the Navy Cross recipients who perished in combat are inscribed in Puerto Rico's "El Monumento de la Recordacion" (Monument of Remembrance). The monument is dedicated to the Puerto Ricans (both those who were born in the island and/or those who were born elsewhere, but are of Puerto Rican descent) who have fallen in combat as members of the Armed Forces of the United States. The monument is located in front of the Capitol Building of Puerto Rico in San Juan.

== See also ==
- List of Puerto Ricans-Military
- Puerto Rican recipients of the Medal of Honor
- Puerto Rican recipients of the Distinguished Service Cross
- Navy Cross
- El Grito de Lares
- Intentona de Yauco
- List of Puerto Ricans
- List of Puerto Rican military personnel
- Military history of Puerto Rico
- Puerto Rican Campaign
- Puerto Ricans in World War I
- Puerto Ricans in World War II
- Puerto Ricans in the Vietnam War
- Puerto Ricans Missing in Action - Korean War
- Puerto Ricans Missing in Action - Vietnam War
- Puerto Rican Nationalist Party Revolts of the 1950s
- Puerto Rican women in the military
- 65th Infantry Regiment
- Puerto Rican recipients of the Presidential Medal of Freedom
- Puerto Rican recipients of the Presidential Citizens Medal

== Notes ==
- N.B. An asterisk after the name indicates that the award was given posthumously.
