= List of Puerto Rican Presidential Citizens Medal recipients =

Puerto Rican recipients of the Presidential Citizens Medal
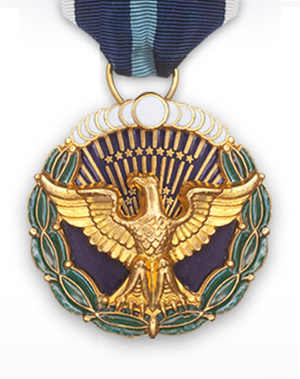
- Presidential Citizens Medal
- Presented by: President of the United States

This is a list of notable Puerto Ricans who were awarded the Presidential Citizens Medal. The list includes people who were born in Puerto Rico, people who are of full or partial Puerto Rican ancestry, such as Victoria Leigh Soto whose father is Puerto Rican. It also includes other residents or immigrants of other ethnic heritages who have made Puerto Rico their home, and who are recognized for their life or work.

Three Puerto Ricans have been awarded the Presidential Citizens Medal, an award bestowed by the President of the United States. It is the second highest civilian award in the United States, second only to the Presidential Medal of Freedom. Established on November 13, 1969, it recognizes individuals "who have performed exemplary deeds or services for his or her country or fellow citizens". The award is only eligible to United States citizens and may be awarded posthumously. Baseball Hall of Famer Roberto Clemente was also the posthumous recipient of the Congressional Gold Medal and the Presidential Medal of Freedom.

== Recipients of the Presidential Citizens Medal ==
The following people are the recipients of the Presidential Citizens Medal:

Name	Year awarded	Occupation
Roberto Clemente (USMC picture)	1973 (posthumous)	Baseball Hall of Famer
Helen Rodríguez Trías	2001	Pediatrician, educator, and leader in public health
Victoria Leigh Soto (Puerto Rican father)	2012 (posthumous)	Teacher

== See also ==
- List of Puerto Ricans
- List of Puerto Rican Presidential Medal of Freedom recipients
- List of awards for volunteerism and community Service
- Puerto Rican recipients of the Medal of Honor
- Puerto Rican recipients of the Navy Cross
- Puerto Rican recipients of the Distinguished Service Cross
- History of women in Puerto Rico
