= Puerto Rican recipients of the Distinguished Service Cross =

Distinguished Service Cross Medal

Puerto Ricans have served as members of the United States Armed Forces and have fought in every major conflict in which the United States has been involved from World War I onward. Many Puerto Ricans, including those of Puerto Rican descent, have distinguished themselves during combat as members of the five branches of the U.S. Military, the Army, Marines, Navy, Air Force and the Coast Guard.

Nine Puerto Ricans have been awarded the United States' highest military decoration—the Medal of Honor—while seven have been awarded the Navy Cross and nineteen have been awarded the Distinguished Service Cross.

The Distinguished Service Cross (DSC) is the second highest military decoration of the United States Army, awarded for extreme gallantry and risk of life in actual combat with an armed enemy force. Actions which merit the Distinguished Service Cross must be of such a high degree to be above those required for all other U.S. combat decorations but not meeting the criteria for the Medal of Honor. The following is a list of the fifteen Puerto Ricans awarded the Distinguished Service Cross with their citations.

On March 18, 2014, President Barack Obama upgraded the Distinguished Service Crosses awarded to Juan E. Negrón, Demensio Rivera, Miguel Vera and Félix M Conde Falcón to the Medal of Honor in a ceremony held in the White House.

== World War II ==
=== Luis F. Castro ===
Private First Class Luis F. Castro born in Orocovis, Puerto Rico was assigned to 47th Infantry Regiment, 9th Infantry Division in the U.S. Army. PFC. Castro's platoon was about to be overrun by enemy German forces, when he decided to stay in the rear flank and cover his men's retreat by providing firepower killing 15 of the enemy in the process.

Distinguished Service Cross Citation:

LUIS F. CASTRO
Citation:

The President of the United States takes pleasure in presenting the Distinguished Service Cross to Luis F. Castro (32873352), Private First Class, U.S. Army, for extraordinary heroism in connection with military operations against an armed enemy while serving with the 47th Infantry Regiment, 9th Infantry Division, in action against enemy forces on 10 December 1944, in Germany. Private First Class Castro occupied a position alone on the right flank of an intricate enemy trench system captured by his company. As two platoons of Germans advanced along the trench toward him, Private First Class Castro, fully aware of his small supply of ammunition, withheld his fire. When enemy troops jammed the trench a short distance away, he poured point-blank fire upon them until his ammunition was expended. Ignoring intense small arms fire, he repelled a second attack with hand grenades. As the enemy withdrew, 15 dead were found within 20 feet of his position. Private First Class Castro's intrepid actions, personal bravery and zealous devotion to duty exemplify the highest traditions of the military forces of the United States and reflect great credit upon himself, the 9th Infantry Division, and the United States Army. Headquarters, First U.S. Army, General Orders No. 27 (February 15, 1945)

Postscript:

=== Anibal Irizarry ===
Private Anibal Irizarry born in Puerto Rico, was assigned to Co. L, 18th Infantry Regiment, 1st Infantry Regiment. Private Irizarry single-handedly destroyed two enemy machine gun nests and captured eight enemy soldiers.

Distinguished Service Cross Citation:

ANIBAL IRIZARRY
Citation:

The President of the United States takes pleasure in presenting the Distinguished Service Cross to Anibal Irizarry, Private, U.S. Army, for extraordinary heroism in connection with military operations against an armed enemy while serving with Company L, 18th Infantry Regiment, 1st Infantry Division, in action against enemy forces in November 1942. Private Irizarry's intrepid actions, personal bravery and zealous devotion to duty exemplify the highest traditions of the military forces of the United States and reflect great credit upon himself, the 1st Infantry Division, and the United States Army. Headquarters, Fifth U.S. Army, General Orders No. 18 (1943)

Postscript: Private Anibal Irizarry was seriously wounded after he destroyed the second machine gun nest and was awarded the Purple Heart Medal.

=== Joseph Martinez ===
Private First Class Joseph Martinez born in San Germán, Puerto Rico destroyed a German Infantry unit and tank in Tunis by providing heavy artillery fire, saving his platoon from being attacked in the process. He received the Distinguished Service Cross from General George S. Patton, thus becoming the first Puerto Rican recipient of said military decoration.

Distinguished Service Cross Citation:

JOSEPH R. MARTINEZ
Citation:

The President of the United States takes pleasure in presenting the Distinguished Service Cross to Joseph R. Martinez, Private First Class, U.S. Army, for extraordinary heroism in connection with military operations against an armed enemy in action against enemy forces in March 1943. Private First Class Martinez's intrepid actions, personal bravery and zealous devotion to duty exemplify the highest traditions of the military forces of the United States and reflect great credit upon himself, his unit, and the United States Army. Headquarters, Seventh U.S. Army, General Orders No. 25 (1943)

Postscript PFC Martinez was the first Puerto Rican to be awarded the Distinguished Service Cross.

== Korean War ==
=== Modesto Cartagena ===
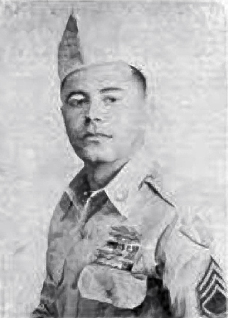

Sergeant First Class Modesto Cartagena (July 21, 1921 – March 2, 2010), born 1920 in Cayey, Puerto Rico, was the most decorated Puerto Rican soldier in history. Cartagena was assigned to Company C, 1st Battalion, 65th Infantry Regiment, 3d Infantry Division in the U.S. Army.

Distinguished Service Cross Citation:

MODESTO CARTAGENA
Citation:

The Distinguished Service Cross is presented to Modesto Cartagena (RA10404100), Sergeant, U.S. Army, for extraordinary heroism in connection with military operations against an armed enemy of the United Nations while serving with Company C, 1st Battalion, 65th Infantry Regiment, 3d Infantry Division in the U.S. Army. Sergeant Cartagena distinguished himself by extraordinary heroism in action against enemy aggressor forces in the vicinity of Yonch'on, Korea, on 19 April 1951. On that date, Company C was assigned the mission of capturing Hill 206, a terrain feature dominating a critical road junction. When the company assaulted the summit, it encountered stubborn resistance from a well-entrenched and fanatically determined hostile force. Sergeant Cartagena, directed to move his squad forward in order to approach the enemy positions from another ridgeline, led his men toward the objective, but, almost immediately, the group was forced to seek cover from an intense and accurate volume of small-arms and automatic-weapons fire. Locating the hostile emplacements that posed the greatest obstacle to the advance of the friendly forces, Sergeant Cartagena left his position and, charging directly into the devastating enemy fire he hurled a grenade at the first emplacement, totally destroying it. Ordering his squad to remain under cover, he successfully and single-handedly assaulted the second enemy position. Although knocked to the ground by exploding enemy grenades, Sergeant Cartagena repeated this daring action three more times. Finally, an increased volume of fire from the remaining hostile emplacements was concentrated on him and he was wounded. The extraordinary heroism and completely selfless devotion, to duty displayed by Sergeant Cartagena throughout this action enabled the company to secure its objective successfully with a minimum of casualties, reflect great credit on himself and are in keeping with the highest traditions of the military service. Headquarters, Eighth U.S. Army, Korea: General Orders No. 698 (September 16, 1951) Home Town: Puerto Rico

Postscript: Cartagena's family, upon learning of Modesto's actions, have taken it upon themselves to make a request to Congress, that he be awarded the Medal of Honor.

=== Badel Hernández Guzmán ===
Private Badel Hernández Guzmán, from Humacao, Puerto Rico, was assigned to Company I, 65th Infantry Regiment, 3d Infantry Division in the U.S. Army. Private Hernández Guzmán singlehanded destroyed an enemy strongpoint with a flame thrower.

Distinguished Service Cross Citation:

BADEL HERNANDEZ GUZMAN
Citation:

Private BADEL HERNANDEZ GUZMAN, US50104254, Infantry, United States Army. Private HERNANDEZ GUZMAN, a member of an infantry company, distinguished himself by extraordinary heroism in action against the enemy in the vicinity of Chorwon, Korea. On 1 October 1951, Private HERNANDEZ GUZMAN'S company was assigned the mission of attacking a numerically superior hostile force occupying well fortified hill positions. In the opening phase of the attack, the assaulting elements were pinned down by a devastating volume of hostile automatic weapons fire. Realizing that his comrades faced annihilation in their present untenable positions, Private HERNANDEZ GUZMAN picked up a flame thrower and began to move forward. Upon locating the hostile emplacement which posed the greatest threat to his comrades, he unhesitatingly ran toward it. Crossing a wide expanse of open terrain, and completely exposed to the concentrated fire of the enemy, he made his way to within twenty yards of the machine gun position. The enemy, in desperation, converged the entire volume of their firepower on Private HERNANDEZ GUZMAN, hurling numerous grenades in an attempt to halt the singlehanded assault. Undeterred by the intense hostile fire, Private HERNANDEZ GUZMAN charged the remaining twenty yards and destroyed the enemy strongpoint with the flame thrower. Through his courageous and selfless actions, the friendly force was able to renew its assault and overrun its objective. The extraordinary heroism and steadfast devotion to duty displayed by Private HERNANDEZ GUZMAN reflect the greatest credit on himself and are in keeping with the highest traditions of the military service. Entered the Federal Service from Puerto Rico.

Postscript: Private Hernández Guzmán was also awarded the Silver Star for his actions.

=== Elmy L. Matta ===
1st. Lieutenant Elmy L. Matta* (May 26, 1921 – August 3, 1950) was a member of the 8th Cavalry Regiment (Infantry), 1st CAV DIV. Lieutenant Matta was killed while personally leading an assault of his company against the enemy in the face of intense small arms and automatic weapons fire.

Distinguished Service Cross Citation:

ELMY L. MATTA
Citation:

The Distinguished Service Cross is presented to Elmy L. Matta (O-0038339), First Lieutenant (Infantry), U.S. Army, for extraordinary heroism in connection with military operations against an armed enemy of the United Nations while serving as Commanding Officer of Company F, 2d Battalion, 8th Cavalry Regiment (Infantry), 1st Cavalry Division. First Lieutenant Matta distinguished himself by extraordinary heroism in action against enemy aggressor forces near Kumchon, Korea, on 3 August 1950. On that date, Lieutenant Matta was assigned mission of destroying an enemy road block which had cut the Division supply route and personally led the assault of his company against the enemy in the face of intense small arms and automatic weapons fire. Even after expending all his ammunition, Lieutenant Matta pressed the attack with his bayonet, causing the enemy to bolt and run. During this action Lieutenant Matta was killed. His fearlessness and aggressive leadership inspired his company to eliminate the enemy and successfully complete the mission. Headquarters, Eighth U.S. Army, Korea: General Orders No. 46 (August 31, 1950) Home Town: Puerto Rico

Postscript: 1st. Lieutenant Elmy L. Matta was buried with full military honors in the Puerto Rico National Cemetery located in Bayamon, Puerto Rico

=== Juan E. Negrón ===
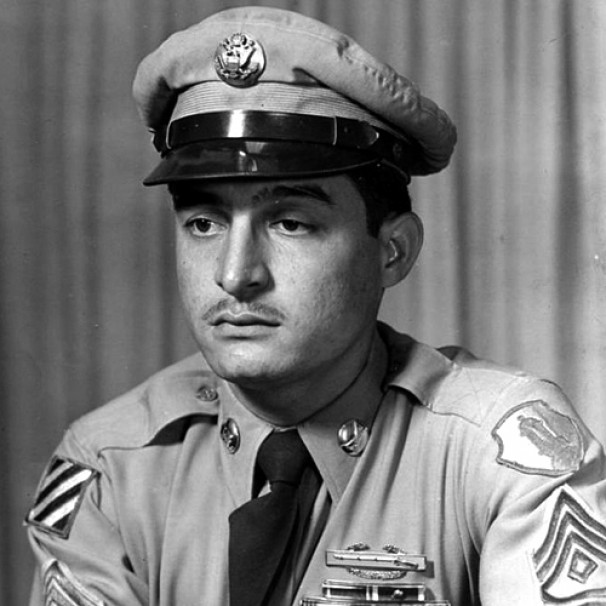

Master Sergeant Juan E. Negrón From Corozal, Puerto Rico was assigned to the 65th Infantry, 3d Infantry Division which was also known as the Borinqueneers. Master Sergeant Negron halted an enemy attack by accurately hurled hand grenades at short range.

Distinguished Service Cross Citation:

JUAN E. NEGRON
Citation:

The Distinguished Service Cross is presented to Juan E. Negron (RA10406243), Master Sergeant, U.S. Army, for extraordinary heroism in connection with military operations against an armed enemy of the United Nations while serving with the 65th Infantry Regiment, 3d Infantry Division. Master Sergeant Negron distinguished himself by extraordinary heroism in action against enemy aggressor forces in the vicinity of Kalma-Eri, Korea, on 28 April 1951. On that date, Sergeant Negron took up the most vulnerable position on his company's exposed right flank after an enemy force had overrun a section of the line. When notified that elements of the company were withdrawing, Sergeant Negron refused to leave his exposed position, but delivered withering fire at hostile troops who had broken through a road block. When the hostile troops approached his position, Sergeant Negron accurately hurled hand grenades at short range, halting their attack. Sergeant Negron held the position throughout the night, while an allied counter attack was organized and launched. After the enemy had been repulsed, fifteen enemy dead were found only a few feet from Sergeant Negron's position. The extraordinary heroism exhibited by Sergeant Negron on this occasion reflects great credit on himself and is in keeping with the finest traditions of the military service.. Headquarters, Eighth U.S. Army, Korea: General Orders No. 588 (June 21, 1953) Home Town: Puerto Rico

Postscript: His DSC Medal was upgraded to the Medal of Honor on March 18, 2014.

=== Fabian Nieves Laguer ===
Corporal Fabian Nieves Laguer was a member of Company C, 65th Infantry Regiment, 3d Infantry Division. Corporal Nieves Laguer made three separate trips across a fire swept terrain to carry the stricken soldiers to safety. He was then able to furnish effective fire support to cover the withdrawal and subsequent reorganization of his unit.

Distinguished Service Cross Citation:

FABIAN NIEVES LAGUER
Citation:

Corporal FABIAN NIEVES LAGUER, RA30419666, Infantry, United States Army. Corporal FABIAN NIEVES-LAGUER, a member of Company C, 65th Infantry Regiment, 3d Infantry Division, distinguished himself by extraordinary heroism in action against the enemy in the vicinity of Chwanchan-dong, Korea, on 19 April 1951. Corporal NIEVES-LAGUER's unit was given the mission of attacking and securing positions held by a well entrenched and fanatically determined enemy force. Moving forward under intense enemy mortar and small arms fire, Corporal NIEVES-LAGUER, an automatic rifleman, repeatedly charged enemy dug-outs, clearing them of opposition and enabling the remainder of his squad to advance without casualties. However, the hostile fire finally became so intense that the advancing friendly elements were forced to withdraw to more tenable positions. As the enemy launched a powerful counterattack, Corporal NIEVES-LAGUER observed three wounded men lying directly in the path of the onrushing hostile forces. With utter disregard for his personal safety, he made three separate trips across the fire swept terrain to carry the stricken soldiers to safety. After successfully evacuating the injured men, Corporal NIEVES-LAGUER returned to his position and manned his weapon. From his emplacement he was able to furnish effective fire support to cover the withdrawal and subsequent reorganization of his unit. The outstanding devotion to duty and extraordinary heroism displayed by Corporal NIEVES LAGUER in this action reflect great credit on himself and are in keeping with the highest traditions of the military service. Entered the federal service from Puerto Rico.

Postscript: A citizen of Kansas falsely used Nieve-Laguer's Silver Star citation as his own.

This one came from another DSC citation. The recipient: Army Cpl. Fabian Nieves-Laguer. He was a member of the famous "Borinqueneers," the 65th Infantry Regiment from Puerto Rico.

=== Belisario Noriega ===
Master Sergeant Belisario Noriega served with the 65th Infantry Regiment, 3d Infantry Division. He led his men through the hostile ranks of the enemy to the safety of the main line of resistance.

Distinguished Service Cross Citation:

BELISARIO NORIEGA
Citation:

The Distinguished Service Cross is presented to Belisario Noriega, Master Sergeant, U.S. Army, for extraordinary heroism in connection with military operations against an armed enemy of the United Nations while serving with 65th Infantry Regiment, 3d Infantry Division. Master Sergeant Noriega distinguished himself by extraordinary heroism in action against enemy aggressor forces in the vicinity of the Chorwon, Korea, on 27 October 1952. On that date, Sergeant Noriega was with a company defending an outpost position which was subjected to a heavy barrage of artillery and mortar fire. When a fire started in the ammunition supply point, Sergeant Noriega, fully cognizant of the dangers involved, rushed to the scene and assisted in extinguishing the blaze. Upon his return to the defensive positions, Sergeant Noriega found that one of the platoon leaders was a casualty and his men had become confused and disorganized under the strain of the intense shelling. Sergeant Noriega immediately reorganized the men, deployed them in the most advantageous positions, assigned fields of fire and through the assault which followed Sergeant Noriega maintained command of the platoon and employed it effectively. When the company was ordered to withdraw after the position had been encircled, Sergeant Noriega led the men through the hostile ranks to the safety of the main line of resistance. The extraordinary heroism exhibited by Sergeant Noriega on this occasion reflects great credit on himself and is in keeping with the finest traditions of the military service. Headquarters, Eighth U.S. Army, Korea: General Orders No. 698 (July 27, 1953) Entered the Federal service from Puerto Rico.

Postscript: Master Sergeant Belisario Noriega died July 21, 1972, and was buried with full military honors in the Puerto Rico National Cemetery located in Bayamon, Puerto Rico

=== Demensio Rivera ===
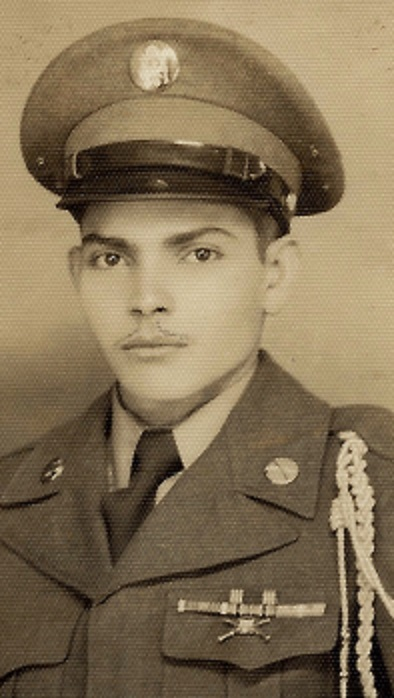

Private First Class Demensio Rivera* was born in Cabo Rojo, Puerto Rico he was still a child when his parents moved to New York City where he was raised. Rivera was a member of Company G, 2d Battalion, 7th Infantry Regiment, 3d Infantry Division of the U.S. Army. With his automatic rifle, he delivered a continuous and devastating fire at the approaching enemy until this weapon became inoperative, whereupon he employed his pistol and grenades and stopped the enemy within a few feet of his position.

Distinguished Service Cross Citation:

DEMENSIO RIVERA
Citation:

The Distinguished Service Cross is presented to Demensio Rivera (RA12346464), Private First Class, U.S. Army, for extraordinary heroism in connection with military operations against an armed enemy of the United Nations while serving with Company G, 2d Battalion, 7th Infantry Regiment, 3d Infantry Division. Private First Class Rivera distinguished himself by extraordinary heroism in action against enemy aggressor forces at Changyong-ni, Korea, on 22 and 23 May 1951. When the outpost area occupied by his platoon was assaulted during the night, Private Rivera, an automatic rifleman, held his forward position tenaciously, although exposed to very heavy fire. With his automatic rifle, he delivered a continuous and devastating fire at the approaching enemy until this weapon became inoperative, whereupon he employed his pistol and grenades and stopped the enemy within a few feet of his position. During a renewed attack, he fought the enemy hand-to-hand and forced them back. Finally, as an overwhelming number of the enemy closed in on him, he killed four of them with his only remaining grenade, although they were in such close proximity he was severely wounded by the same explosion, When is position was retaken, he was recovered, seriously wounded, and lying with the bodies of the four enemy dead or dying. Private Rivera's fearless performance was a major factor in successfully repulsing the enemy's attacks. Department of the Army: General Orders No. 75 (August 6, 1952) Home Town: New York, New York

Postscript: His DSC Medal was upgraded to the Medal of Honor on March 18, 2014.

=== Frank Carpa Rocha ===
Corporal Frank Carpa Rocha* (died August 10, 1951) was a heavy machine-gunner with the 15th Infantry Regiment, 3d Infantry Division. He provided supporting fire which enabled his unit to withdraw. He was attempting to reload his weapon when he was hit by a burst of enemy machine-gun fire and mortally wounded.

Distinguished Service Cross Citation:

FRANK CARPA ROCHA
Citation:

The Distinguished Service Cross is presented to Frank Carpa Rocha (US50000205), Corporal, U.S. Army, for extraordinary heroism in connection with military operations against an armed enemy of the United Nations while serving as a heavy machine-gunner with an Infantry Company of the 15th Infantry Regiment, 3d Infantry Division. Corporal Rocha distinguished himself by extraordinary heroism in action against enemy aggressor forces in the vicinity of Sang-to-Dong, Korea, on 10 August 1951. On that date, a friendly patrol set out to occupy a commanding terrain feature with orders to engage any hostile troops between the patrol base and the objective. Corporal Rocha volunteered to accompany the patrol in order to render supporting fire with a recoilless rifle. Upon locating enemy emplacements, the assaulting elements of the patrol moved forward to make contact and Corporal Rocha was ordered to station his weapon on a ridge to their rear. Reaching the ridge, Corporal Rocha realized that the range was too long for the recoilless rifle to be used with maximum effect and so, with a total disregard for his personal safety, he moved forward to the position held by the friendly riflemen. Kneeling calmly in an exposed position, he fired with deadly accuracy at the hostile emplacements. Each time he fired, the enemy sought him out and concentrated a heavy volume of automatic-weapons and small-arms fire on him. His devastating fire accounted for many key enemy positions and inflicted numerous casualties among the hostile troops. In desperation, the numerically superior enemy launched a series of fanatical attacks which made it necessary for the friendly force to fall back a short distance with each assault. Upon receiving the order to withdraw, Corporal Rocha observed that his comrades were pinned down by heavy automatic-weapons fire. Moving to an area completely exposed to enemy observation, he fearlessly knelt and provided supporting fire which enabled the friendly force to withdraw. He was attempting to reload his weapon when he was hit by a burst of enemy machine-gun fire and mortally wounded. Headquarters, Eighth U.S. Army, Korea: General Orders No. 1021 (December 26, 1951) Home Town: Puerto Rico

Postscript: Rocha's name was engraved on the Hawaii Korean War Memorial on the Capitol grounds.

=== Miguel A. Vera ===
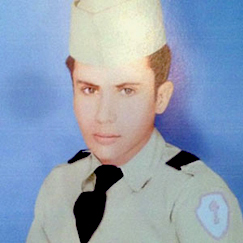

Private Miguel Armando Vera* (died September 21, 1952) was a member of Company F, 2d Battalion, 38th Infantry Regiment, 2d Infantry Division. He lost his life while he provided firing power to cover the withdrawal of his comrades

Distinguished Service Cross Citation:

MIGUEL A. VERA
Citation:

The Distinguished Service Cross is presented to Miguel A. Vera (US50110351), Private, U.S. Army, for extraordinary heroism in connection with military operations against an armed enemy of the United Nations while serving with Company F, 2d Battalion, 38th Infantry Regiment, 2d Infantry Division. Private Vera distinguished himself by extraordinary heroism in action against enemy aggressor forces at Chorwon, Korea, on 21 September 1952. On that date, Private Vera's unit was committed to assault and secure the right sector of "Old Baldy" and, although wounded in an earlier engagement, he voluntarily rejoined elements of the platoon regrouping at the base of the hill to resume the attack. Forging up the bare, rocky slope in skirmisher formation, the troops came within twenty yards of hostile positions when they were subjected to heavy artillery and mortar barrages and intense cross-fire from automatic weapons and grenades, which forced them to move back. He selflessly remained behind to cover the withdrawal and, maintaining a determined stand, poured crippling fire into enemy emplacements. During this action he lost his life. Department of the Army: General Orders No. 37 (April 29, 1953) Home Town: Puerto Rico

Postscript: Vera was buried with full military honors in the local cemetery of Utuado. His DSC Medal was upgraded to the Medal of Honor on March 18, 2014.

== Vietnam War ==
=== Félix M Conde Falcón ===
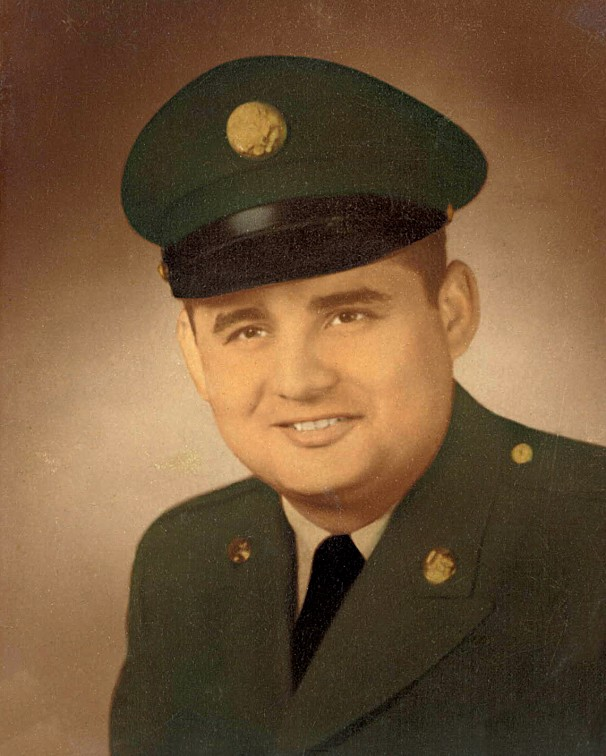

Staff Sergeant Félix M Conde Falcón*(February 24, 1938 – April 4, 1969) was born in Juncos, Puerto Rico, and raised in Chicago, Ill. He joined the U.S. Army in April 1963 and was deployed to the Republic of Vietnam a member of the 3rd Platoon, Delta Company, 1st Battalion, 505th Infantry Regiment, 82nd Airborne Division. Conde Falcón was killed in action while serving as a platoon leader during a sweep operation in the vicinity of Ap Tan Hoa, Vietnam, after destroying multiple enemy bunkers and demonstrating extraordinary leadership under fire.

Distinguished Service Cross Citation:

FELIX M. CONDE-FALCON
UNITED STATES ARMY
Citation:

The President of the United States of America, authorized by Act of Congress, July 9, 1918 (amended by act of July 25, 1963), takes pride in presenting the Distinguished Service Cross (posthumously) to:

For extraordinary heroism in connection with military operations involving conflict with an armed hostile force in the Republic of Vietnam, while serving with Company D, 1st Battalion, 505th Infantry, 3rd Brigade, 82nd Airborne Division:

Conde-Falcon distinguished himself by exceptionally valorous actions, April 4, 1969, while serving as platoon leader during a sweep operation in the vicinity of Ap Tan Hoa, Vietnam. Entering a heavily wooded section on the route of advance, the company encountered an extensive enemy bunker complex, later identified as a battalion command post. Following tactical artillery and air strikes on the heavily secured communist position, the platoon of Conde-Falcon was selected to assault and clear the bunker fortifications. Moving out ahead of his platoon, he charged the first bunker, heaving grenades as he went. As the hostile fire increased, he crawled to the blind side of an entrenchment position, jumped to the roof, and tossed a lethal grenade into the bunker aperture. Without hesitating, he proceeded to two additional bunkers, both of which he destroyed in the same manner as the first. Rejoined with his platoon, he advanced about one hundred meters through the trees, only to come under intense hostile fire. Selecting three men to accompany him, he maneuvered toward the enemy's flank position. Carrying a machine-gun, he single-handedly assaulted the nearest fortification, killing the enemy inside before running out of ammunition. After returning to the three men with his empty weapon and taking up an M-16 rifle, he concentrated on the next bunker. Within ten meters of his goal, he was shot by an unseen assailant and soon died of his wounds.

His great courage, his ability to act appropriately and decisively in accomplishing his mission, his dedication to the welfare of his men mark him as an outstanding leader Conde-Falcon's extraordinary heroism and devotion to duty, at the cost of his life, were in keeping with the highest traditions of the military service and reflect great credit upon himself, his unit, and the United States Army.

Postscript: His DSC Medal was upgraded to the Medal of Honor on March 18, 2014.

=== Efraín Figueroa-Meléndez ===
Staff Sergeant Efraín Figueroa-Meléndez (died March 5, 1969) was born in Cataño, Puerto Rico. He was a member of Company D, 3d Battalion, 8th Infantry Regiment, 4th Infantry Division of the U.S. Army. On three occasions Staff Sergeant Figueroa-Meléndez purposely drew communist volleys on himself to permit his men to draw back to protected positions.

Distinguished Service Cross Citation:

EFRAIN FIGUEROA-MELENDEZ
Citation:

The Distinguished Service Cross is presented to Efrain Figueroa-Melendez, Staff Sergeant, U.S. Army, for extraordinary heroism in connection with military operations involving conflict with an armed hostile force in the Republic of Vietnam, while serving with Company D, 3d Battalion, 8th Infantry, 4th Infantry Division. Staff Sergeant Figueroa-Melendez distinguished himself by exceptionally valorous actions on 5 March 1969 while on a mission to recover several wounded soldiers from an enemy-infiltrated area west of Kontum. En route to the objective area, his company encountered hostile machine gun and small arms fire and were pinned down. In order to withdraw and regroup successfully, Sergeant Figueroa-Melendez moved forward and laid a devastating suppressive barrage on the enemy bunkers. Three times he purposely drew communist volleys on himself to permit his men to draw back to protected positions. Noticing a wounded soldier dangerously exposed and unable to move, Sergeant Figueroa-Melendez maneuvered to the downed man and proceeded to administer medical aid. Then, when he attempted to evacuate the casualty, he was struck by sniper fire and killed. Staff Sergeant Figueroa-Melendez's extraordinary heroism and devotion to duty, at the cost of his life, were in keeping with the highest traditions of the military service and reflect great credit upon himself, his unit, and the United States Army. HQ US Army, Vietnam, General Orders No. 2464 (September 8, 1969) Home Town: Cataño, Puerto Rico

Postscript: Staff Sergeant Efraín Figueroa-Meléndez was buried with full military honors in the Puerto Rico National Cemetery located in Bayamon, Puerto Rico.

=== Fruto James Oquendo ===
Spc4 Fruto James Oquendo* (died May 6, 1969) of Puerto Rican descent, was born in New York City. Oquendo was a member of the U.S. Army and in Vietnam served with Company C, 2d Battalion, 8th Cavalry Regiment, 1st Brigade of the 1st Cavalry Division. He was mortally wounded while defending his area during a hand-to-hand struggle.

Distinguished Service Cross Citation:

FRUTO JAMES OQUENDO
Company C, 2d Battalion, 8th Cavalry Regiment, 1st Brigade, 1st Cavalry Division
Date of Action: May 6, 1969
Citation:

The Distinguished Service Cross is presented to Fruto James Oquendo, Specialist Fourth Class, U.S. Army, for extraordinary heroism in connection with military operations involving conflict with an armed hostile force in the Republic of Vietnam, while serving with Company C, 2d Battalion, 8th Cavalry, 1st Brigade, 1st Cavalry Division (Airmobile). Specialist Four Oquendo distinguished himself by exceptionally valorous actions on 6 May 1969 while serving as a machine gunner at a fire support base in Tay Ninh Province. In the early morning hours, the base began to receive heavy rocket and mortar fire followed by a ground assault. When a North Vietnamese regiment armed with machine guns and satchel charges rushed the perimeter, Specialist Oquendo detonated claymore mines and placed rifle fire into their advancing ranks. As the enemy attempted to blast openings in the wire barrier, he valiantly attempted to abort their efforts. Soon, however, the enemy forces penetrated the berm in several spots and began throwing grenades and small arms fire at Specialist Oquendo's position. He and several others in his bunker were wounded, but he refused to be evacuated. When he depleted his ammunition, he grabbed one of his wounded comrade's weapons and continued firing. In a determined bid to capture his bunker, the communists stormed his position. During the hand to hand struggle, he was mortally wounded while defending his area. Specialist Oquendo's extraordinary heroism and devotion to duty, at the cost of his life, were in keeping with the highest traditions of the military service and reflect great credit upon himself, his unit, and the United States Army. HQ US Army, Vietnam, General Orders No. 2673 (July 17, 1969) Home Town: New York, New York

Postscript: Oquendo was buried with full military honors in Long Island National Cemetery, East Farmingdale, Suffolk County, New York, Plot: 2A, 5277

=== Wilfredo Pagan-Lozada ===
Sergeant First Class Wilfredo Pagan-Lozada* (died February 9, 1967) born in New York City to Puerto Rican parents, Pagan-Lozada was a member of the U.S. Army and served in Vietnam with Company D, 2d Battalion, 5th Cavalry Regiment, 1st Cavalry Division. At the cost of his life, Sgt. Pagan-Lozada, charged into a through a hail of bullets to save an officers life.

Distinguished Service Cross Citation:

WILFREDO PAGAN-LOZADA
Sergeant First Class, U.S. Army
Company D, 2d Battalion, 5th Cavalry Regiment, 1st Cavalry Division
Date of Action: February 9, 1967
Citation:

The Distinguished Service Cross is presented to Wilfredo Pagan-Lozada, Sergeant First Class, U.S. Army, for extraordinary heroism in connection with military operations involving conflict with an armed hostile force in the Republic of Vietnam, while serving with Company D, 2d Battalion, 5th Cavalry, 1st Cavalry Division (Airmobile). Sergeant First Class Pagan-Lozada distinguished himself by exceptionally valorous actions on 9 February 1967 while serving as a platoon sergeant with elements of the 5th Cavalry during a combat reconnaissance mission near Phu Loc. As his company maneuvered across open rice paddies, it suddenly received intense hostile fire from a village 100 meters to its front. Seeing his platoon leader wounded and lying exposed to enemy fire, Sergeant Pagan-Lozada dauntlessly left his covered position and dashed forward firing his weapon. When his rifle jammed, he grabbed another and fearlessly continued across the bullet swept sandbar. Unmindful of the grave dangers, Sergeant Pagan-Lozada charged on through a hail of bullets to the fallen soldier. He then fired an entire magazine into the hostile emplacements less than twenty-five meters away, as he shielded his stricken leader with his own body. When Sergeant Pagan-Lozada tried to pull the officer to safety, he was fatally wounded by enemy fire. His unimpeachable valor and selfless sacrifice, while trying to save a fellow soldier, will serve as a source of lasting inspiration to all those who knew him. Sergeant First Class Pagan-Lozada's extraordinary heroism and devotion to duty, at the cost of his life, were in keeping with the highest traditions of the military service and reflect great credit upon himself, his unit, and the United States Army. HQ US Army, Vietnam, General Orders No. 3405 (July 6, 1967) Home Town: New York, New York

Postscript: Pagan-Lozada was buried with full military honors in Long Island National Cemetery, East Farmingdale, Suffolk County, New York.

=== Ramiro Ramirez ===
First Sergeant Ramiro Ramirez was a member of Company C, 1st Battalion, 18th Infantry Regiment, 2d Brigade, 1st Infantry Division. First Sergeant Ramirez despite being wounded pulled one of his man to the safety of a bomb crater and refused aid until all others had been treated. Receiving word that another man had been severely wounded, Sergeant Ramirez volunteered to rescue him and was hit in the arm and chest as he left the crater.

Distinguished Service Cross Citation:

RAMIRO RAMIREZ
Citation:

The Distinguished Service Cross is presented to Ramiro Ramirez, First Sergeant, U.S. Army, for extraordinary heroism in connection with military operations involving conflict with an armed hostile force in the Republic of Vietnam, while serving with Company C, 1st Battalion, 18th Infantry, 1st Infantry Division. First Sergeant Ramirez distinguished himself by exceptionally valorous actions on 5 October 1968 during a reconnaissance-in-force mission in a heavy jungle west of Lai Khe. The point element of his company suddenly received intense small arms, automatic weapons and rock-propelled grenade fire, causing several casualties. Exposing himself to the enemy barrage, Sergeant Ramirez made his way to one of the wounded men, carried him to a covered position and administered lifesaving first aid. While rescuing a second injured comrade, he was struck in the head by automatic weapons fire. Despite his pain, he continued to pull the man to the safety of a bomb crater and refused aid until all others had been treated. Receiving word that another man had been severely wounded, Sergeant Ramirez volunteered to rescue him and was hit in the arm and chest as he left the crater. Disregarding his own injuries, he reached the casualty and dragged him back to the protection of the shell crater where he again refused medical treatment until he finally lost consciousness. First Sergeant Ramirez's extraordinary heroism and devotion to duty were in keeping with the highest traditions of the military service and reflect great credit upon himself, his unit, and the United States Army. HQ US Army, Vietnam, General Orders No. 706 (February 27, 1969) Home Town:Puerto Rico

Postscript: Ramiro Ramirez died November 30, 2005, in Temple, Texas. He was buried with full military honors in Arlington National Cemetery Arlington, Virginia.

=== Reinaldo Rodríguez ===
Private First Class Reinaldo Rodríguez* (died January 15, 1971) was born in Guanica, Puerto Rico. He belonged to Company C, 1st Battalion, 27th Infantry Regiment, 2d Brigade, 25th Infantry Division in the U.S. Army. Private Rodriguez provided cover fire for his comrades maintaining suppressive fire upon the adversary until he was wounded a third time. Although evacuated immediately to the rear medical facilities, Private Rodriguez succumbed to his wounds.

Distinguished Service Cross Citation:

REINALDO RODRIGUEZ
Citation:

The Distinguished Service Cross is presented to Reinaldo Rein Rodriguez, Private First Class, U.S. Army, for extraordinary heroism in connection with military operations involving conflict with an armed hostile force in the Republic of Vietnam, while serving with Company C, 1st Battalion, 27th Infantry, 2d Brigade, 25th Infantry Division. Private First Class Rodriguez distinguished himself by exceptionally valorous actions on 15 January 1971 while serving as a member of a reconnaissance platoon during operations in Long Khanh Province. As Private Rodriguez's platoon was reconnoitering the area, they encountered a well-entrenched hostile force firing automatic weapons and rocket-propelled grenades. Observing that an allied machine gunner was wounded and unable to defend his position, the private crawled forward to the gunner's location and began placing devastating volleys of bullets upon the hostile force. When an enemy sniper began concentrating accurate fire upon the allied defenses, Private Rodriguez exposed himself to the foe and silenced the belligerent with a well-aimed burst from his M-16 rifle. While he was in this open position, the private was wounded in the flurry of bullets. With enemy rounds striking all around him, Private Rodriguez disregarded his own pain as he felled another sniper. His platoon was running perilously low on ammunition and began to withdraw to a re-supply point. Voluntarily, the private remained at the rear to provide cover fire for his comrades. Suddenly, an enemy rocket-propelled grenade impacted just meters from him, inflicting additional wounds. Despite his weakened condition, Private Rodriguez continued to maintain suppressive fire upon the adversary until he was wounded a third time. Although evacuated immediately to the rear medical facilities, Private Rodriguez succumbed to his wounds in the early morning hours of 16 January. Private First Class Rodriguez's extraordinary heroism and devotion to duty, at the cost of his life, were in keeping with the highest traditions of the military service and reflect great credit upon himself, his unit, and the United States Army. HQ US Army, Vietnam, General Orders No. 920 (March 16, 1971) Home Town: Guanica, Puerto Rico

Postscript: Rodriguez's name is among those inscribed in "El Monumento de la Recordación" in San Juan Puerto Rico.

=== Aristides Sosa ===
Corporal Aristides Sosa* (December 14, 1946 – March 2, 1968) was born in Puerto Rico. His parents moved to New York City in 1947 when he was one year old. In 1967, he received a draft notice while attending Baruch College of Business Administration. He was drafted into the Army via the Selective Service system during the Vietnam War. He served in Company A, 65th Engineer Battalion, 25th Infantry Division in the U.S. Army. On March 2, 1968, Corporal Sosa rolled on top of a grenade to save another soldier from its blast and was mortally wounded by the exploding grenade.

Distinguished Service Cross Citation:

ARISTIDES SOSA
Citation:

The President of the United States of America, authorized by Act of Congress, July 9, 1918 (amended by act of July 25, 1963), takes pride in presenting the Distinguished Service Cross (Posthumously) to Corporal [then Private First Class] Aristides Sosa (ASN: US-52758743), United States Army, for extraordinary heroism in connection with military operations involving conflict with an armed hostile force in the Republic of Vietnam, while serving with Company A, 65th Engineer Battalion, 25th Infantry Division. Corporal Sosa distinguished himself by exceptionally valorous actions on 2 March 1968. On this date, Corporal Sosa was part of a four-man engineer team accompanying an infantry unit on a reconnaissance-in-force operation in the vicinity of Lai Theiu when the friendly force came under attack from Claymore mines, automatic weapons and small arms fire. Moments after he had reached cover in a ditch, there was a devastating explosion nearby and he was painfully wounded. As one of his comrades crawled to his position to offer assistance, an enemy grenade was detected flying through the air toward Corporal Sosa's position. As the grenade landed and began rolling toward his comrade, Corporal Sosa rolled on top of the grenade to save the soldier from its blast and was mortally wounded by the exploding grenade. His courageous actions in complete disregard for his own safety were responsible for saving the life of his comrade. Corporal Sosa's extraordinary heroism and devotion to duty were in keeping with the highest traditions of the military service and reflect great credit upon himself, his unit, and the United States Army.

Department of the Army, General Orders No. 80 (December 16, 1968) Home Town: New York City

Postscript: Sosa's name is among those inscribed on Panel 42E, LINE 43 of the Vietnam Veteran's Memorial in Washington DC.. In July 2010, Building 200 on Fort Belvoir, Virginia, was rededicated as the Sosa Community Center in Corporal Aristides Sosa’ honor. It houses Army Community Service and the Soldier Family Assistance Center.

== El Monumento de la Recordación ==
El Monumento de la Recordación

The names of the Distinguished Service Cross recipients who perished in combat are inscribed in Puerto Rico's "El Monumento de la Recordación" (Monument of Remembrance). The monument is dedicated to the Puerto Ricans (both those who were born in the island and/or those who were born elsewhere, but are of Puerto Rican descent) who have fallen in combat as members of the Armed Forces of the United States. The monument is located in front of the Capitol Building of Puerto Rico in San Juan.

== See also ==
- Puerto Rican recipients of the Medal of Honor
- Puerto Rican recipients of the Navy Cross
- Distinguished Service Cross
- List of Puerto Rican military personnel
- Military history of Puerto Rico
- Puerto Rican Campaign
- Puerto Ricans in World War I
- Puerto Ricans in World War II
- Puerto Ricans in the Vietnam War
- Puerto Ricans Missing in Action - Korean War
- Puerto Ricans Missing in Action - Vietnam War
- Puerto Rican women in the military
- 65th Infantry Regiment
- Puerto Rican recipients of the Presidential Medal of Freedom
- Puerto Rican recipients of the Presidential Citizens Medal

== Notes ==
- N.B. An asterisk after the name indicates that the award was given posthumously.
