= List of Puerto Ricans missing in action in the Vietnam War =

POW/MIA flag

The United States Department of Defense estimated that approximately there were 18 Puerto Ricans missing in action in the Vietnam War, from a total of 2,338 people that were listed as Missing in Action. This total, with the exception of PFC. Jose Ramon Sanchez, does not include people of Puerto Rican descent born in the mainland of the United States.

Puerto Rico was officially ceded to the United States from Spain under the terms of the 1898 Treaty of Paris which concluded the Spanish–American War. It is a United States territory and upon the outbreak of World War I, the U.S. Congress approved the Jones–Shafroth Act, which granted Puerto Ricans citizenship. As a result, Puerto Ricans have participated in every war involving the United States from World War I onward.

Thousands of Puerto Ricans participated in these wars. Many lived and returned to their homeland, others were less fortunate and either died as a result of a hostile enemy action or were listed as MIA (Missing In Action). Missing In Action (abbreviated MIA) is a term (dating from 1946) referring to a member of the armed services who is reported missing following a combat mission and whose status as to injury, capture, or death is unknown. The missing combatant must not have been otherwise accounted for as either killed in action or a prisoner of war. The Vietnam War was one of two wars (the other was the Korean War) which accounted for the most Puerto Ricans missing in action.

== Vietnam War ==
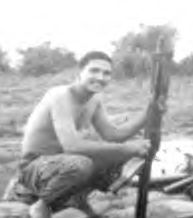
PFC Humberto Acosta-Rosario-MIA

The Vietnam War was between the Democratic Republic of Vietnam (DRVN, or North Vietnam) and the Republic of Vietnam (RVN, or South Vietnam), which eventually involved their respective allies. In 1959, the United States sent military advisors to train the South Vietnamese Army. By 1965, there were 25,000 military advisors in South Vietnam.." The United States participation in the war continued to escalate until April 30, 1975 when the United States officially declared the war over. During the Vietnam War, an estimated 48,000 Puerto Ricans served in the four branches of the armed forces. Of a total of 345 Puerto Ricans who died in combat, 18 were listed as MIA's. They were all members of the Army with the exceptions of First Lieutenant Jose Hector Ortiz who was the only Puerto Rican MIA member of the United States Air Force and PFC Jose R. Sanchez who was a member of the United States Marine Corps. Of the 18 Puerto Rican MIA's, PFC. Humberto Acosta-Rosario is the only one whose body has never been recovered and is currently still listed as Missing In Action. Friendly forces captured documents from the Vietnam People's Army 7th Infantry Division dated August 23, 1968. The documents were analyzed by US intelligence agencies. The reports documented that Humberto Acosta-Rosario was in fact captured by NVA forces during the battle near the Ben Cui Rubber Plantation. However, the US military chose not to upgrade his status to Prisoner of War.

Acosta-Rosario's name was listed in the USG's (United States Government) "Last Known Alive" list. This list was released by the U.S. Government in April 1991 and it contains the names of Prisoners of War and Missing in Action who were known to be alive in enemy hands and for whom there is no evidence that he or she died in captivity. In March 1978, Acosta-Rosario was declared dead/body not recovered based on a presumptive finding of death.

PFC. Humberto Acosta-Rosario was posthumously promoted to the rank of Staff Sergeant. His name is on panel 47W, line 030 of the Vietnam Memorial Wall in Washington, D.C., and he is also list in El Monumento de la Recordacion located in San Juan, Puerto Rico. There is a headstone with his name inscribed Plot: MB 0 6 of Puerto Rican National Cemetery in Bayamon, Puerto Rico.

== Puerto Ricans Missing In Action ==
The following is a list with the names, ranks, date and place of birth and the date that the person was listed as MIA:

Name	Rank	Date of birth	Place of birth	MIA Date
Acosta-Rosario, Humberto	Staff Sergeant	January 15, 1947	Mayagüez, Puerto Rico	March 1, 1968
Aubain, Joseph Augustín	Specialist 4	October 9, 1949	San Juan, Puerto Rico	November 28, 1971
Burgos Torres, Benjamín	Private First Class	August 23, 1950	Cayey, Puerto Rico	February 15, 1971
Guzmán-Ríos, Antonio	Specialist 4	April 9, 1945	Corozal, Puerto Rico	May 12, 1968
Irizarry-Hernández, Ángel	Specialist 6	October 2, 1943	Hato Rey, Puerto Rico	October 13, 1967
Kuilan, Wenceslao	Staff Sergeant	September 28, 1929	Bayamón, Puerto Rico	January 25, 1966
Maldonado-Torres, Lionel	Corporal	April 21, 1949	Juana Díaz, Puerto Rico	September 17, 1968
Márquez-López, Luis Manuel	Sergeant First Class	July 20, 1927	Guayama, Puerto Rico	December 13, 1967
Martínez-Zayas, Rubén	Corporal	February 21, 1951	Salinas, Puerto Rico	August 26, 1970
Medina-Torres, Vincente	Master Sergeant	January 22, 1925	San Juan, Puerto Rico	April 6, 1967
Miranda-Ortiz, José Luis	Staff Sergeant	January 28, 1936	Río Piedras, Puerto Rico	November 30, 1967
Ortiz, José Héctor	First Lieutenant	September 8, 1946	Carolina, Puerto Rico	April 29, 1970
Ortiz-Rodríguez, Ángel	Sergeant	May 1, 1941	Puerto Rico	March 9, 1967
Quiñones-Borrás, Nicholas	Major	April 30, 1935	Santurce, Puerto Rico	June 5, 1972
Ramos, Armando	Sergeant First Class	January 1, 1921	Santurce, Puerto Rico	October 4, 1966
Rosado-Rodríguez, Eugenio	Private First Class	October 30, 1943	Ponce, Puerto Rico	July 19, 1966
Sanchez, Jose Ramon	Private First Class	March 15, 1949	Brooklyn, N.Y.	June 6, 1968
Vadi Rodríguez, Alberto	Specialist 5	March 4, 1950	San Juan, Puerto Rico	March 17, 1972

El Monumento de la Recordación

Their names are inscribed on both the Vietnam Veterans Memorial located in Washington, D.C., and in El Monumento de la Recordación (the Wall of Remembrance) located in San Juan, Puerto Rico.

== See also ==
- Military history of Puerto Rico
- List of Puerto Ricans missing in action in the Korean War
- El Grito de Lares
- Intentona de Yauco
- List of Puerto Ricans
- List of Puerto Rican military personnel
- Puerto Rican Campaign
- Puerto Ricans in World War I
- Puerto Ricans in World War II
- Puerto Ricans in the Vietnam War
- Puerto Rican Nationalist Party Revolts of the 1950s
- Puerto Rican recipients of the Distinguished Service Cross
- Puerto Rican recipients of the Medal of Honor
- Puerto Rican recipients of the Navy Cross
- Puerto Rican women in the military
- 65th Infantry Regiment
