= List of Puerto Ricans missing in action in the Korean War =

POW/MIA flag

The United States Department of Defense has estimated that approximately 61,000 Puerto Ricans served in the military during the Korean War, most of them volunteers. A total of 122 Puerto Rican soldiers were among the 8,200 people listed as missing in action (MIA). According to the Defense POW/MIA Accounting Agency, there are 167 who are unaccounted for. This list does not include non-Puerto Ricans who served in the 65th Infantry, nor those who were "POW" (Prisoners of War) or "KIA" (Killed in Action). Nor does the total of this list include people of Puerto Rican descent who were born in the mainland of the United States.

Spain officially ceded Puerto Rico to the United States under the terms of the 1898 Treaty of Paris which concluded the Spanish–American War. It is a United States territory and upon the outbreak of World War I, the Congress enacted the Jones–Shafroth Act, which gave Puerto Ricans American citizenship with certain limitations (for example, Puerto Ricans are not allowed to vote in presidential elections).

Thousands of Puerto Ricans participated in these conflicts. Many lived and returned to their homeland, others either died or have been listed as missing in action. The term "MIA" dates from 1946 and refers to a member of the armed services who is reported missing following a combat mission and whose status as to injury, capture, or death is unknown. The missing combatant must not have been otherwise accounted for as either killed in action or a prisoner of war. The Korean War was one of two major conflicts which accounted for the most Puerto Ricans missing in action, the other being the Vietnam War.

== Korean War ==
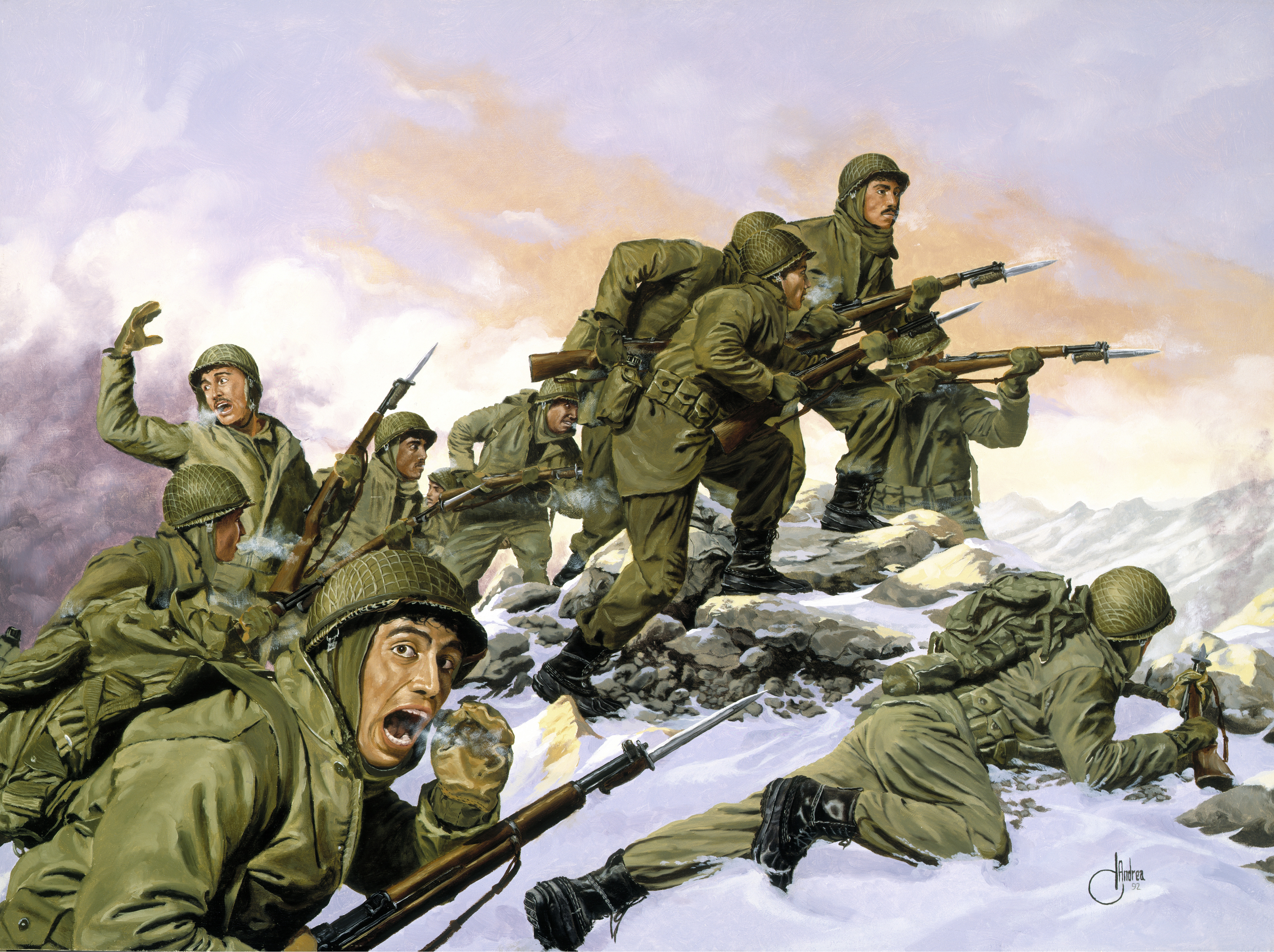
1992 painting depicting the Puerto Rican 65th Infantry Regiment's bayonet charge against a Chinese division during the Korean War.

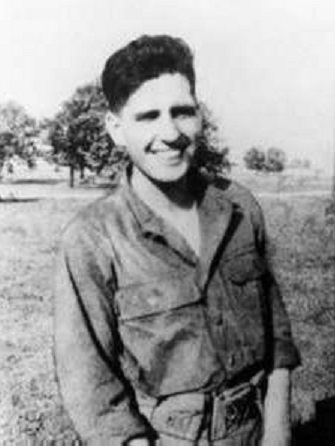
PFC Ramón Núñez-Juárez

According to the online archive "All POW-MIA Korean War Casualties," the total number of Puerto Rican casualties in the Korean War was 732. Out of the more than 700 casualties suffered in the war, a total of 122 Puerto Rican men were listed as Missing in Action.

It was during the Korean War that Puerto Ricans suffered the most casualties as members of an all-Hispanic volunteer unit: the 65th Infantry Regiment. One of the problems the unit faced was the language difference; the common foot soldier spoke only Spanish, while the commanding officers were mostly English-speaking. In September 1952, the 65th Infantry was holding onto a hill known as "Outpost Kelly" until the People's Volunteer Army which had joined the North Koreans, overran the position. This became known as the Battle for Outpost Kelly. Twice, the 65th Regiment was overwhelmed by Chinese artillery and driven off. The Battle of Outpost Kelly accounted for 73 of the men missing in action from the total of 122. Out of the 73 MIAs suffered by the regiment in the month of September, 50 of them occurred on the same day: September 18.

According to the Defense POW/MIA Accounting Agency seven Puerto Ricans who were members of the United States Marine Corps, with the exception of PFC Ramón Núñez-Juárez and PFC Manuel Perez-Pizarro who were Killed In Action. PFC Enrique Romero-Nieves and PFC Ramón Núñez-Juárez were awarded the Navy Cross, the second highest medal after the Medal of Honor that can be awarded by the Department of the Navy. Ramón Núñez-Juárez, who was listed as MIA, was posthumously awarded the medal. Núñez-Juárez's remains have never been recovered and a symbolic burial with full military honors was held on October 25, 1970. His name and that of the others are inscribed in El Monumento de la Recordación, a monument dedicated to the Puerto Ricans who have fallen in combat, located in San Juan, Puerto Rico.

== Puerto Ricans missing in action ==
The following is a list with the names, ranks and the date in which 122 Puerto Ricans were listed as missing in action in the Korean War.

All of these men served within the ranks of the United States Army with the exception of Ramón Núñez-Juárez and Francisco González Matías, who served in the United States Marine Corps.

Name	Rank	MIA date
Isaac Acevedo	Corporal	September 18, 1952
Héctor Alfaro Alfaro	Private	September 24, 1952
Hugo Álvarez	Corporal	June 5, 1951
Luis Amaro García	Private first class	September 18, 1952
Euripides Amy-Colon	Private first class	February 6, 1952
Lopus Andino Fonseca	Private	September 24, 1952
Jorge Berríos Santiago	Private	September 24, 1952
Julio Bonilla Vega	Private	September 18, 1952
José Burset Meléndez	Private	September 24, 1952
A Caballero Moreno	Private first class	April 1953
Juan Calderón Osorio	Private first class	September 18, 1952
A Calimano Texidor	Private	September 18, 1952
Benigno Caraballo	Private	December 11, 1951
Juan Caramot Ortiz	Private	September 24, 1952
Miguel Cartagena Colón	Private	Unknown
Manuel Colon Aponte	Private first class	September 18, 1952
Concepción Colón	Private	July 31, 1952
Luis Colón Negrón	Private	September 24, 1952
José Concepción López	Private first class	September 18, 1952
James W. Connor	Captain	December 1, 1950
Zenon Cordero Cajigas	Private	September 24, 1952
Ángel Cortés Ostolaza	Private	September 24, 1952
Francisco Cosme Báez	Private first class	September 18, 1952
Jesús Cruz Beltrán	Private first class	September 18, 1952
José Cruz Carrero	Private first class	September 18, 1952
Roberto Cruz Espinoza	Private	June 4, 1951
Nicolás Cruz Pérez	Corporal	June 10, 1953
Jesús Cruz Ramos	Private first class	June 9, 1953
Pablo Cruz Rosas	Private first class	November 25, 1952
Ángel Cruz Sánchez	Private first class	September 10, 1952
Carlos Dávila Rivera	Private	September 14, 1952
Wenceslao Delgado Ubiles	Private	October 19, 1952
Luis Díaz Acevedo	Private	September 18, 1952
Demetrio Díaz Algarín	Private	September 18, 1952
Fernando Díaz Colón	Private	September 18, 1952
Rafael Díaz Coto	Private	September 18, 1952
Saúl Droz Cartagena	Private first class	December 15, 1952
Carlos D. Feliciano	Private	September 18, 1952
Julio Feliciano Nieves	Private	September 18, 1952
Bienvenido Feliciano Otero	Private	September 18, 1952
Luis Figueroa Barbosa	Private	September 18, 1952
Julio Flores Navarro	Private	October 15, 1952
Ismael García Clara	Private	September 18, 1952
Cándido García Rosado	Private first class	September 25, 1952
Manuel González Bernard	Private	September 18, 1952
Israel González Nazario	Private	July 17, 1952
Juan E. González Ortiz	Private	September 18, 1952
Porfirio González Renta	Private	September 18, 1952
Ángel González Rosario	Private	September 18, 1952
Israel González Saez	Private	September 18, 1952
Santos González	Private	September 18, 1952
Isidro Hernández Dones	Corporal	September 21, 1952
Luis Hernández Rodríguez	Private	September 18, 1952
Benjamín Hernández Torres	Private first class	August 12, 1952
O. Irizarry Gerena	Private	December 16, 1951
A. Jiménez Olivencia	Corporal	September 18, 1952
Miguel Jiménez Tosado	Private first class	July 9, 1953
Maximian Lacsamana	Corporal	December 3, 1950
Jaime Laugier	Corporal	February 16, 1952
Luis López Cronoz	Private	September 18, 1952
Herminio Luciano Rodriguez	Private first class	December 9, 1952
Israel Malaret Juarbe	Sergeant first class	December 10, 1952
Ramón Marquez De León	Private first class	October 27, 1952
Luis Martínez Hernández	Private	September 18, 1952
Ramon Martínez Landrón	Private	September 21, 1952
Luis Martínez	Private	November 6, 1952
Pedro Martínez Otero	Corporal	September 18, 1952
Francisco Matos González	Private first class	September 18, 1952
Alberto Meléndez Meléndez	Private first class	October 23, 1952
Marcial Meléndez Negrón	Corporal	September 24, 1952
Luis Méndez Hernández	Corporal	July 19, 1952
Salomé Mercado Hernández	Private first class	September 18, 1952
Carlos Miranda Cotto	Private first class	September 18, 1952
Roberto Molina García	Private first class	September 21, 1952
Maximino Molina Gerena	Corporal	February 6, 1952
Sixto Montañez Franco	Private first class	September 18, 1952
Alfredo Morales Reyes	Corporal	August 14, 1952
Nelson Moreno Rosa	Corporal	September 18, 1952
Ramón Murga Amador	Private first class	September 18, 1952
José A. Napoleón Escudero	Private	September 18, 1952
Jorge Negrón Martínez	Private first class	September 18, 1952
José Negrón Ortiz	Corporal	September 18, 1952
Arcadio Nieves Larry	Corporal	September 24, 1952
Ramón Núñez-Juárez	Private first class	September 8, 1952
Bartolomé Pacheco	Private	January 8, 1952
Juan Peña Andújar	Private first class	September 18, 1952
Miguel Pérez	Private first class	January 8, 1952
Pedro Pérez Pérez	Private first class	August 12, 1952
Efraín Pérez Rodríguez	Corporal	July 20, 1952
Luis Pérez Villegas	Private	September 18, 1952
Nicolás Pizarro Matos	Private first class	September 18, 1952
Pedro Pomales Pomales	Private	September 21, 1952
Pedro Angel Quiñones Velez	Corporal	September 24, 1952
Marino Quirindongo	Private	December 16, 1951
Marcos Reyes Rodríguez	Private	October 27, 1952
William Reyes	Private	June 5, 1951
Juan Rivera Carrillo	Private first class	October 28, 1952
Roberto Rivera Claudio	Private	October, 1952
Gilberto Rivera Cruz	Private first class	September 18, 1952
Israel Rivera Galarza	Private first class	September 18, 1952
Luis P. Rivera	Private first class	September 26, 1952
Raul Rivera Rodríguez	Private first class	September 18, 1952
Rubén Rivera	Private	September 24, 1952
Enrique Rodríguez	Private	July 8, 1953
Alberto Rodríguez Lozada	Sergeant first class	June 4, 1951
Pedro A. Rodríguez	Private first class	January 11, 1952
Juan Rojas Reyes	Private first class	September 20, 1952
Ramón Roque Peña	Private first class	October 16, 1952
José Rosado Bravo	Private first class	September 18, 1952
Francisco Rosario Meléndez	Private first class	September 18, 1952
Ángel Salgado Torres	Private	January 8, 1952
Ángel S. Sanabria	Private first class	January 28, 1952
Rafael Sánchez López	Private first class	September 18, 1952
Angel L. Santiago	Private	June 3, 1951
José Santiago Ortiz	Private first class	October 14, 1952
Ramón Santiago Rosario	Sergeant	February 6, 1952
Norberto Santos Rivero	Corporal	June 4, 1951
Nicolás Santos Rosario	Private first class	December 11, 1951
José Torres Cabán	First lieutenant	September 29, 1950
Jorge Torres Green	Private	July 19, 1952
Samuel Torres Rodríguez	Private first class	September 18, 1952
Jorge L. Vázquez	Sergeant	February 6, 1952
Luis Vélez Montes	Private first class	September 18, 1952
Miguel Vélez Santiago	Private	December 23, 1951
Miguel A. Zayas	Private first class	February 6, 1952

Their names are inscribed in El Monumento de la Recordación (The Wall of Remembrance) located in San Juan, Puerto Rico.

El Monumento de la Recordación

== See also ==
- Military history of Puerto Rico
- 65th Infantry Regiment
- Henry Barracks, Puerto Rico
- Camp Las Casas
- List of Puerto Ricans missing in action in the Vietnam War
- List of Puerto Rican military personnel
- Borinqueneers Congressional Gold Medal
