= VHP =

VHP may refer to:

- Vaporized hydrogen peroxide
- Vassar Haiti Project, a nonprofit organization promoting Haitian art
- Veteran's Heritage Project
- Veterans History Project
- Volcano Hazards Program
- Vishva Hindu Parishad, an Indian Hindutva organization
- Progressive Reform Party (Suriname) (Vooruitstrevende Hervormingspartij), a political party in Suriname
- Civic Solidarity Party (Vətəndaş Həmrəyliyi Partiyası), a political party in Azerbaijan
