= Everett Alvarez Jr. =

American Navy officer (born 1937)

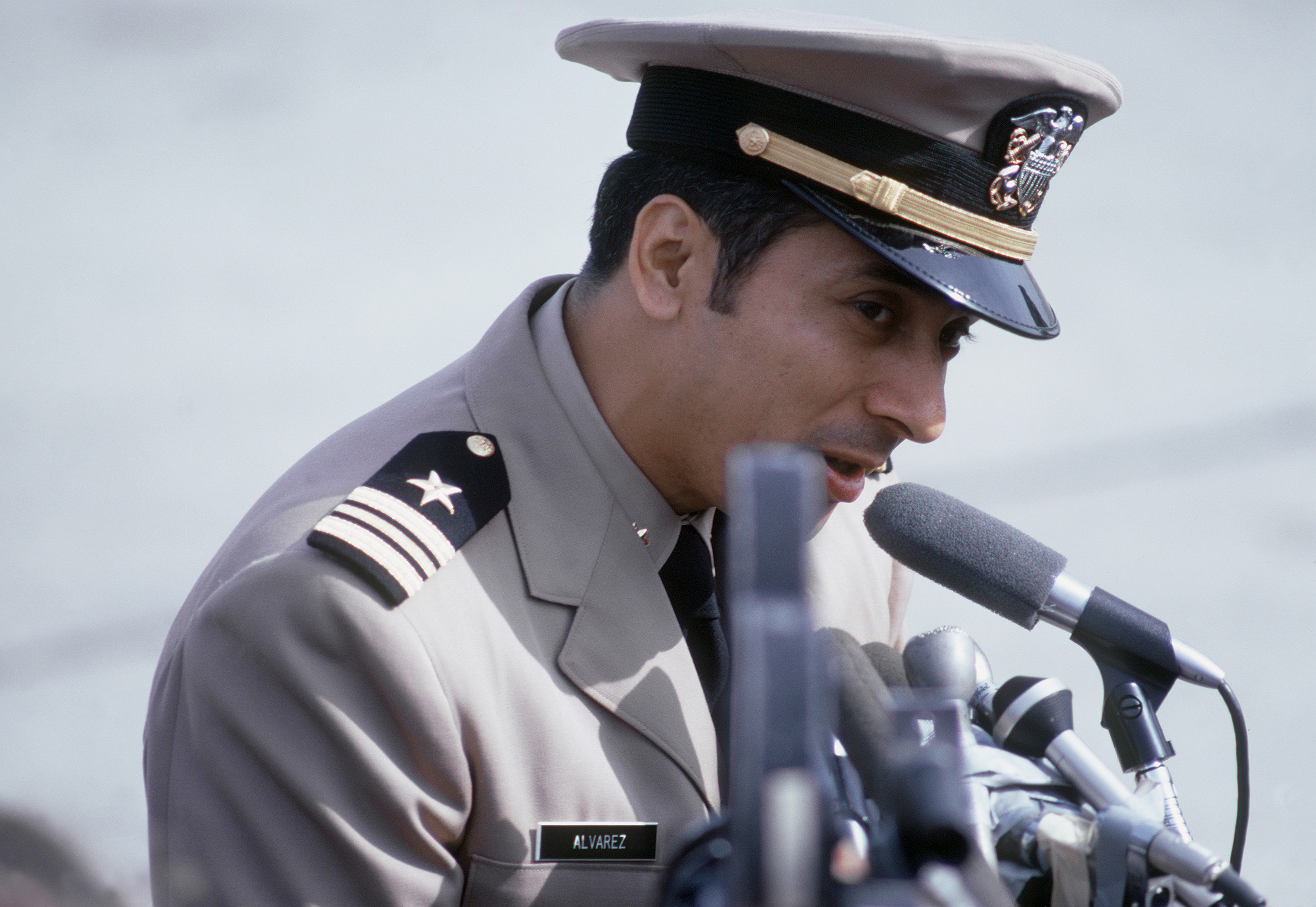
- Alvarez in February 1973, speaking after his release from captivity
- Born: December 23, 1937 (age 88); Salinas, California, U.S.
- Military career
- Allegiance: United States
- Branch: United States Navy
- Service years: 1960–1980
- Rank: Commander
- Conflicts: Vietnam War
- Awards: Silver Star; Legion of Merit (2); Distinguished Flying Cross; Bronze Star Medal (2); Purple Heart (2)
- Other work: Deputy Director, Peace Corps; Deputy Director, Veterans Administration; Founder Alvarez LLC

Everett Alvarez Jr. (born December 23, 1937) is a retired United States Navy officer who endured one of the longest periods as a prisoner of war (POW) in U.S. military history. Alvarez was the first U.S. pilot to be shot down and detained during the Vietnam War and spent over eight years in captivity, making him the second longest-held U.S. POW, after U.S. Army Colonel Floyd James Thompson.

== Early life and captivity ==
Alvarez was born in 1937 in Salinas, California. He is the grandson of immigrants from Mexico. He went to Santa Clara University on an academic scholarship. He joined the United States Navy in 1960 and was selected for pilot training.

On August 5, 1964, during Operation Pierce Arrow, LTJG Alvarez's Douglas A-4 Skyhawk was shot down in the immediate aftermath of what is known as the Gulf of Tonkin incident. Alvarez endured eight years and seven months of brutal captivity by the North Vietnamese at the Hỏa Lò Prison (sarcastically known as the "Hanoi Hilton" by fellow POWs), in which he was repeatedly beaten and tortured. Alvarez was especially esteemed by his fellow prisoners because he was for almost a year the only aviator prisoner of war.

== Back in the United States ==
He was released on February 12, 1973 as part of the first group of American POWs repatriated under Operation Homecoming, after spending 3,113 days in captivity. After hospitalization, Alvarez briefly attended refresher flight training with VT-21 at NAS Kingsville and then attended the U.S. Naval Postgraduate School, where he received a master's degree in Operations Research and Systems Analysis in October 1976. His final assignment was in Program Management at the Naval Air Systems Command in Washington, D.C., from October 1976 until his retirement from the Navy on June 30, 1980.

Alvarez has co-authored two books, writing of his prisoner of war experiences in Chained Eagle and Code Of Conduct. Everett Alvarez High School in his native Salinas, California is named after him. There is also a park named in his honor in Santa Clara, California and a post office named in his honor in Montgomery County, Maryland.

A subdivision at Naval Air Station Lemoore in California was named after Alvarez during his internment.

In 2012, the Mobile, Alabama chapter of the Association of Naval Services Officers (ANSO) was named for Alvarez.

The Lone Sailor Award was given to Alvarez in Washington, D.C., on September 18, 2012. This award is given to sea service veterans who have excelled with distinction in their respective civilian careers while exemplifying the U.S. Navy's stated core values of honor, courage and commitment.

Alvarez was awarded a Congressional Gold Medal by the United States Congress on December 23, 2024.

== Post-military life ==
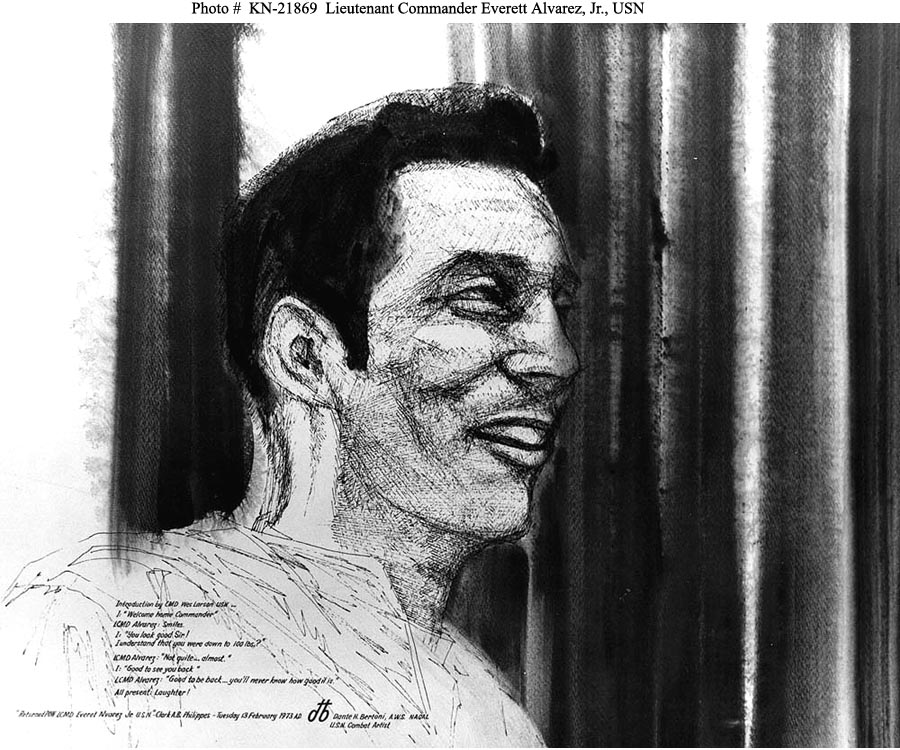
Lieutenant Commander Everett Alvarez Jr., "Welcome Home" sketch by combat artist Dante H. Bertoni.

Alvarez retired from the U.S. Navy with the rank of commander in 1980. He later earned a Master's Degree in Operations and Research Analysis and a Juris Doctor degree.

In April 1981, he was appointed by U.S. President Ronald Reagan to the post of deputy director of the Peace Corps. In July 1982, President Reagan nominated and the U.S. Senate confirmed him as Deputy Administrator of the Veterans Administration (VA). After six years with the VA he was appointed by President Reagan in 1988 to the Board of Regents of the Uniformed Services University of the Health Sciences (USUHS) in Bethesda, Maryland. Alvarez served on that board for almost 21 years, including serving as chairman of the Board twice.

Alvarez has served on the President's Task Force to improve Health Care Delivery for our Nation's Veterans and recently chaired the VA's Capital Asset Realignment and Enhancement Study Commission (CARES). Alvarez also serves on Grantham University's independent Board of Governors.

In 2015, Alvarez with his sister Delia Alvarez were featured in a Public Broadcasting Service (PBS) documentary by producer Mylène Moreno On Two Fronts: Latinos & Vietnam.

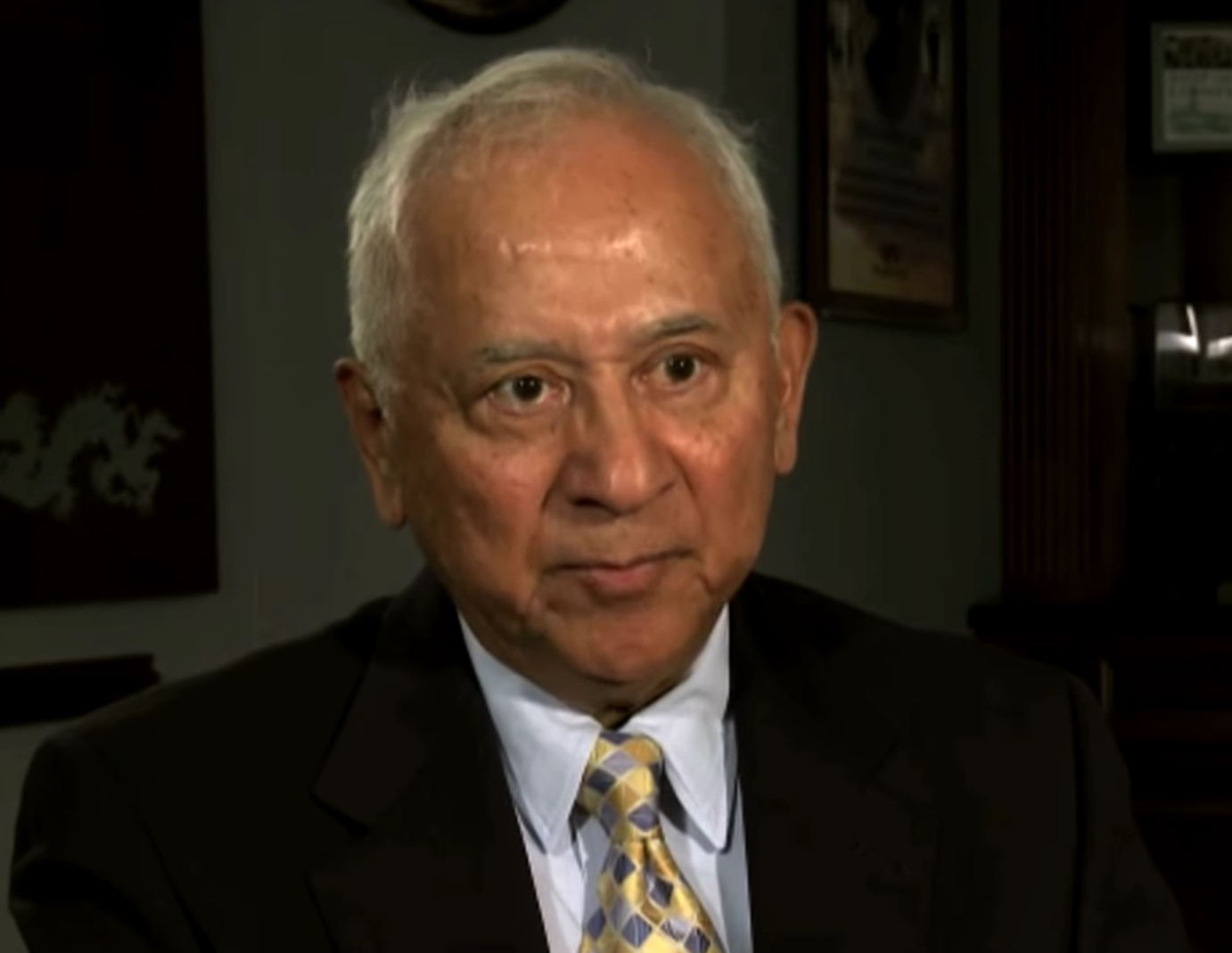
Alvarez in 2012

Alvarez is a lifetime member of the Board of Fellows of Santa Clara University. He served on the board of directors of the International Graduate University of Democracy in Washington, DC. He served on the College of William & Mary Washington, DC Council. He has served on the White House Board of Fellows Selection Committee and on the board of directors of the Armed Services YMCA of the USA. He is on the Library of Congress Veterans History Project Five Star Council Advisory Committee. In 2004, Alvarez founded Alvarez LLC, an IT consulting firm which sells IT services and products to the U.S. government. In March 2014, Alvarez was appointed to the Vietnam War Commemoration Advisory Council by the U.S. Secretary of Defense, Chuck Hagel.

In January 2025, Secretary of the Navy Carlos Del Toro announced that the seventh Constellation-class frigate would be named USS Everett Alvarez in his honor. The ship was cancelled in November 2025.

== Personal life ==
Alvarez is married to Thomasine Ilyas and has two children. In 2004, Alvarez founded Alvarez LLC.

== Military awards ==
He is the recipient of the Silver Star, two Legions of Merit, the Distinguished Flying Cross, two Bronze Star Medals, and two Purple Hearts.

Badge	Naval Aviator insignia		
1st Row	Silver Star		
2nd Row	Legion of Merit w/ Combat "V" and 5/16" Gold Star	Distinguished Flying Cross	Bronze Star Medal w/ Combat "V" and 5/16" Gold Star
3rd Row	Purple Heart w/ 5/16" Gold Star	Combat Action Ribbon	Navy Unit Commendation
4th Row	Prisoner of War Medal	National Defense Service Medal	Armed Forces Expeditionary Medal
5th Row	Vietnam Service Medal w/ three 3/16" silver stars and one 3/16" bronze star	Republic of Vietnam Gallantry Cross Unit Citation	Republic of Vietnam Campaign Medal

== See also ==
- Hispanics in the United States Navy
- On Two Fronts: Latinos & Vietnam
- Floyd James Thompson, the longest held POW in United States history, spending nearly nine years in captivity in Vietnam.
- Ernest C. Brace, the longest held civilian POW in United States history, spending seven years and seven months in captivity in Vietnam.
