= Puerto Ricans in the Vietnam War =

Commencing with World War I, Puerto Ricans and people of Puerto Rican descent have participated as members of the United States Armed Forces in every conflict in which the United States has been involved. Accordingly, thousands of Puerto Ricans served in the Armed Forces of the United States during the Vietnam War, also known as the Second Indochina War. Hundreds of them died, either killed in action (KIA) or while prisoners of war (POW). The Vietnam War started as a Cold War, and escalated into a military conflict that spread to Vietnam, Laos, and Cambodia from 1959 to April 30, 1975.

Puerto Ricans served in different positions throughout the military as commanders, fighter pilots, and common foot soldiers. Many of them distinguished themselves in combat and were awarded the highest honors conferred by the military. Five were awarded the Medal of Honor, the highest United States military decoration; Six were awarded the Distinguished Service Cross (DSC), the second-highest military decoration of the United States Army; and three received the Navy Cross, the second-highest medal that can be awarded by the U.S. Navy. The Navy Cross is awarded to members of the U.S. Navy or U.S. Marine Corps for heroism or distinguished service.

== Brief summary of Puerto Rican military service in the United States military ==
Commencing with World War I, Puerto Ricans and people of Puerto Rican descent have participated as members of the United States Armed Forces in every conflict in which the United States has been involved.

One of the consequences of the Spanish–American War was that Puerto Rico was annexed by the United States in accordance to the terms of the Treaty of Paris of 1898, ratified on December 10, 1898. Puerto Ricans became U.S. citizens as a result of the 1917 Jones–Shafroth Act. The timing of the Jones Act was intentional—it enabled the United States to forcibly conscript Puerto Ricans into the U.S. military, and rapidly deploy them to the trenches of the European front.

Puerto Ricans who resided in the island were immediately assigned to the "Porto Rico Provisional Regiment of Infantry," organized on June 30, 1901, and served in World War I. Those who resided in the mainland United States served in regular units of one of the United States military: the United States Marine Corps, Army or the Navy. The Porto Rico Regiment was renamed the 65th Infantry Regiment under the Reorganization Act of June 4, 1920 and went on to serve in World War II and the Korean War, as the only segregated Army unit, where its members distinguished themselves in combat. On July 25, 1952, the Constitution of Puerto Rico was proclaimed by Gov. Luis Muñoz Marín and the island, which continues to be an unincorporated territory of the United States, adopted the name of Estado Libre Asociado ("Free Associated State"). Despite this "free association," the Puerto Rican government and military remained under complete U.S. jurisdiction. The 65th Infantry was deactivated in 1956, however the Department of the Army was persuaded to transfer the 65th Infantry from the regular Army to the Puerto Rico National Guard. Since then Puerto Ricans have served in regular integrated units of the military.

== The Vietnam War ==
The Vietnam War was fought between communist North Vietnam, supported by its communist allies, and the government of South Vietnam, supported by the United States and other nations. The United States entered the war to prevent a communist takeover of South Vietnam as part of their wider strategy of containment. Military advisors arrived beginning in 1950. U.S. involvement escalated in the early 1960s and combat units were deployed beginning in 1965.

During the Vietnam War, an estimated 48,000 Puerto Ricans served in the four branches of the armed forces. Notable Puerto Ricans who served in the United States Navy in Vietnam were:

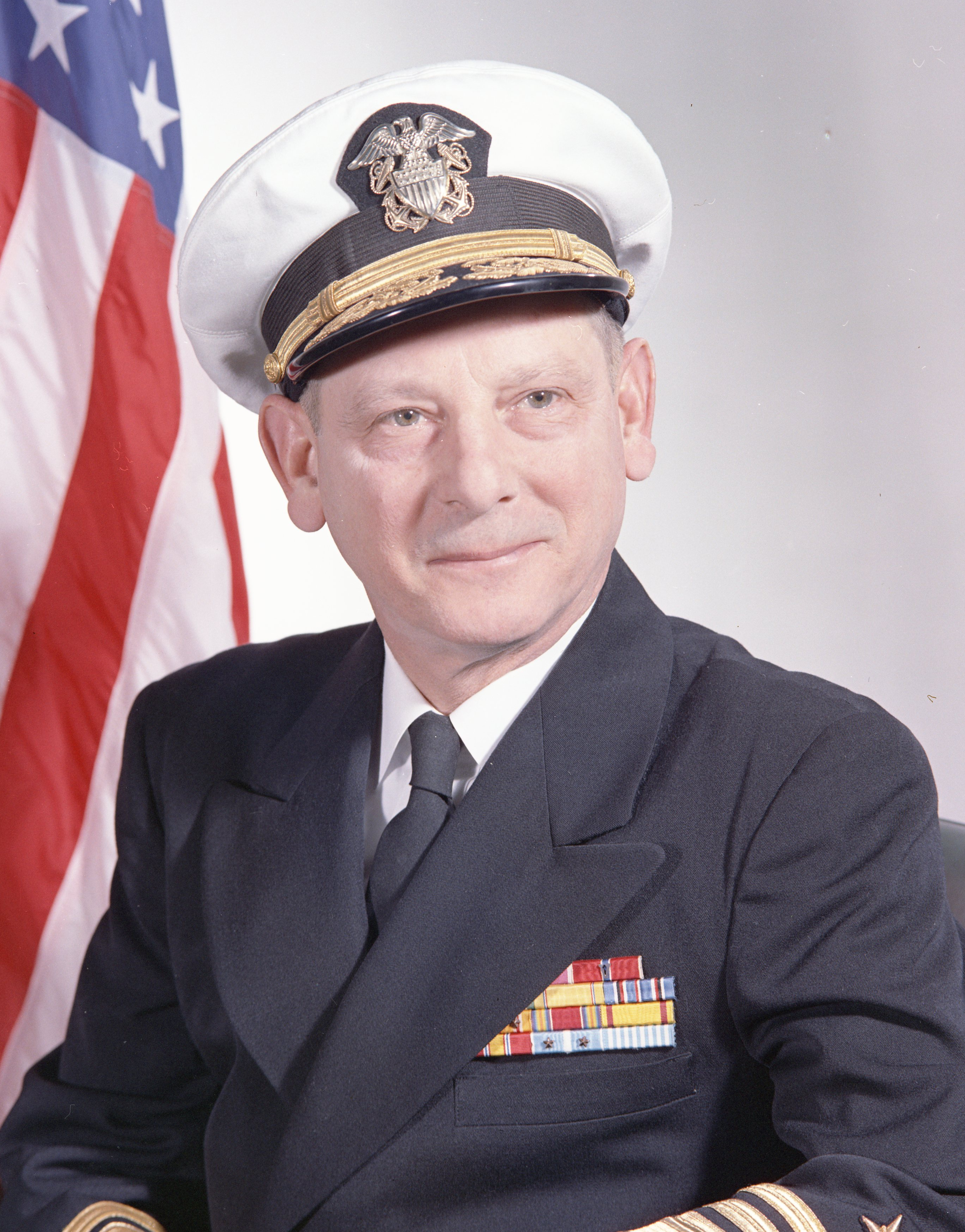
Admiral Horacio Rivero, Jr.

Admiral Horacio Rivero, Jr., the first Puerto Rican four-star Admiral in the United States Navy, oversaw the day-to-day work of the Navy as the Vice Chief of Naval Operations. He was a strong supporter of a "brown-water navy," or riverine force, on the rivers of South Vietnam.

Lieutenant Diego E. Hernández, who retired from the Navy with the rank of Vice Admiral, flew two combat tours in Vietnam during the war. He also served as Aide and Flag Lieutenant to Commander, Carrier Division 14.

Notable Puerto Ricans who served in the United States Air Force in Vietnam were:

Major General Salvador E. Felices held various positions within the military. In June 1968, he was named commander of the 306th Bombardment Wing. He flew 39 B-52 bombing missions over North Vietnam.

Brigadier General Antonio Maldonado, who in 1967 became the youngest pilot and Aircraft Commander of a B-52 Stratofortress nuclear bomber, was assigned in January 1971 to the 432nd Tactical Fighter Reconnaissance Wing, Udon Royal Thai Air Force Base in Thailand. His active participation in the war included 183 air combat missions over North and South Vietnam, Laos and Cambodia, logging more than 400 combat flying hours in the F-4C Phantom.

Brigadier General Antonio J. Ramos, the first Hispanic to serve as commander, Air Force Security Assistance Center, Air Force Materiel Command, and dual-hatted as Assistant to the Commander for International Affairs, Headquarters Air Force Materiel Command. In November 1971, Ramos, who was then a lieutenant, was assigned to the 310th Tactical Airlift Squadron, Phan Rang Air Base and Tan Son Nhut Air Base, South Vietnam. In August 1972, was transferred to U-Tapao Royal Thai Naval Airfield in Thailand where he was the Base Operations Officer until November 1972.

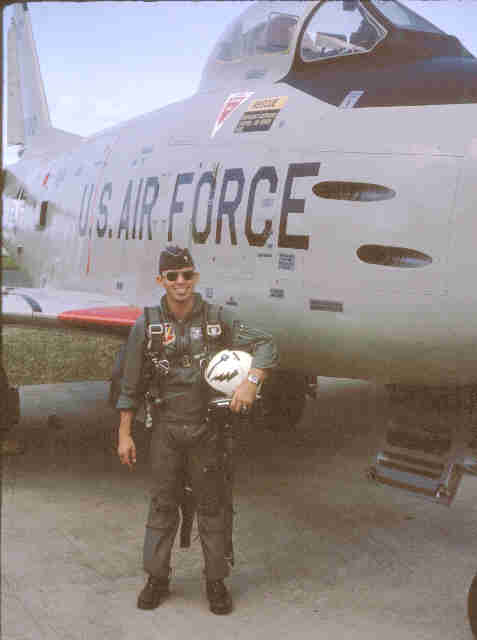
Colonel Negroni poses in front of his F-86H

Brigadier General José M. Portela, as a first lieutenant, was sent to South Vietnam and participated in numerous combat missions.

Brigadier General Ruben A. Cubero was a captain when sent to South Vietnam in May 1969. He was assigned to the 1st Brigade, 25th Infantry Division, 19th Tactical Air Support Squadron, Tay Ninh West, where he flew an OV-10 and served as a forward air controller. In November 1969, he was reassigned to the 19th Tactical Air Support Squadron, at Bien Hoa Air Base.

Colonel Héctor Andrés Negroni, the first Puerto Rican graduate of the United States Air Force Academy, was a captain when he participated in combat missions during the war and accumulated over 600 combat hours. During his tour he served in the 553rd Reconnaissance Squadron stationed in Korat, Thailand and as Chief of Combat Operation in the 7th Airborne Command and Control Squadron in Udon, Thailand.

== The Medal of Honor ==
Five Puerto Ricans were awarded the Medal of Honor, the highest United States military decoration for heroism. All five were members of the United States Army and their awards were posthumous:

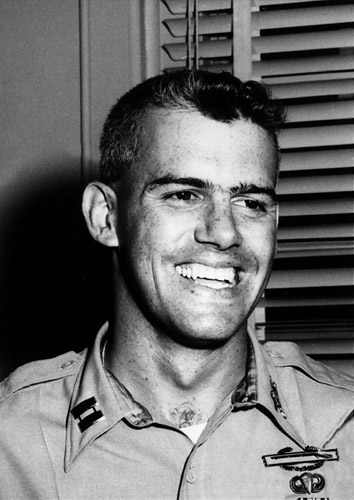
Captain Humbert Roque "Rocky" Versace

Captain Humbert Roque "Rocky" Versace was a United States Army officer of Puerto Rican–Italian descent began his first tour of duty in the South Vietnam as an intelligence advisor. Versace was captured during his second tour and taken to a prison deep in the jungle along with two other Americans, Lieutenant Nick Rowe and Sergeant Dan Pitzer. He tried to escape four times, but failed in his attempts. The Viet Cong separated Versace from the other prisoners. The last time the prisoners heard his voice, he was loudly singing "God Bless America". On September 26, 1965, North Vietnam's "Liberation Radio" announced the execution of Captain Humbert Roque Versace. Versace's remains have never been recovered. On July 8, 2002, in a ceremony in the White House East Room, Versace was posthumously awarded the Medal of Honor by President George W. Bush for his heroism, the first time an Army POW had been awarded the nation's highest honor for actions in captivity.

Captain Eurípides Rubio was a member of H&H Co., 1st Battalion, 28th Infantry, 1st Infantry Division, RVN. On November 8, 1966, Rubio's company came under attack from the North Vietnamese People's Army of Vietnam (PAVN); leaving the safety of his post, Rubio received two serious wounds as he braved the intense enemy fire to distribute ammunition, re-establish positions and render aid to the wounded. Despite his pain, he assumed command when a rifle company commander was medically evacuated. He was then wounded a third time as he tried to move amongst his men to encourage them to fight with renewed effort.

While aiding the evacuation of wounded personnel, he noted that a U.S. smoke grenade, which was intended to mark the PAVN's position for an air strike, had fallen dangerously close to friendly lines — he ran to move the grenade, but was immediately struck to his knees by enemy fire. Despite his wounds, Rubio managed to collect the grenade and run through enemy fire to within 20 meters of the enemy position and throw the by-then already smoking grenade into the enemy before he fell for the final time. Using the now-repositioned grenade as a marker, friendly air strikes were directed to destroy the hostile positions.

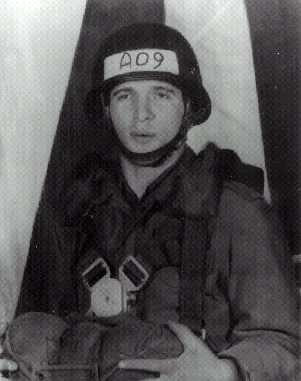
PFC Carlos James Lozada

PFC Carlos James Lozada was assigned to Co. A, 2nd Battalion, 503 Infantry, 173rd Airborne Brigade. On November 20, 1967, at Dak To, Lozada spotted a PAVN company rapidly approaching his outpost. He alerted his comrades and opened fire with a machine gun, killing at least twenty enemy soldiers and disrupting their initial attack. He realized that if he abandoned his position there would be nothing to hold back the surging North Vietnamese soldiers and that his entire company withdrawal would be jeopardized - as a result he told his comrades to move to the back and that he would supply cover for them. He continued to deliver a heavy and accurate volume of suppressive fire against the enemy until he was mortally wounded and had to be carried during the withdrawal.

Specialist Four Héctor Santiago-Colón, on June 28, 1968, members of Santiago-Colon's Company B of the 5th Battalion, 7th Cavalry, 1st Cavalry Division were engaged in combat at Quảng Trị Province. A PAVN soldier lobbed a hand grenade into Santiago-Colon's foxhole. Realizing that there was no time to throw out the grenade, he tucked it in to his stomach and turning away from his comrades, absorbed the full impact of the blast, sacrificing his life to save his fellow soldiers from certain death.

Staff Sergeant Felix M. Conde-Falcon was awarded the Medal of Honor posthumously in a special ceremony held in the White House on March 18, 2014, for his courageous actions while serving as an acting Platoon Leader in Company D, 1st Battalion, 505th Infantry Regiment, 3d Brigade, 82d Airborne Division during combat operations against an armed enemy in Ap Tan Hoa, Republic of Vietnam on April 4, 1969.

== The Navy Cross ==
Three Puerto Ricans were awarded the Navy Cross, the second highest medal that can be awarded by the U.S. Navy and are awarded to members of the U.S. Navy or U.S. Marine Corps for heroism or distinguished service. All were members of the United States Marine Corps:

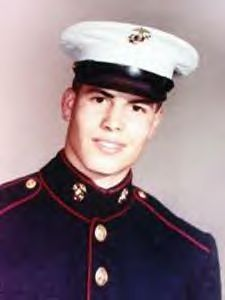
Sgt. Angel Mendez

Corporal Angel Mendez (1946–1967) volunteered to join the Marine Corps after graduating from high school. He was assigned to Company F, 2nd Battalion, 7th Marines, 1st Marine Division on March 16, 1967, and conducting a search and destroy mission with his company when his company came under attack from a Viet Cong battalion. Half of a platoon was pinned down under enemy fire and Mendez, volunteered to lead a squad to assist the pinned-down Marines in returning to friendly lines with their two dead and two seriously wounded. Mendez exposed himself and opened fire on the enemy. His platoon commander, Lieutenant Ronald D. Castille was seriously wounded and he fell, unable to move. Mendez shielded him with his body as he applied a dressing to the wound; he picked up Castille and started to carry him to friendly lines, which were more than seventy-five meters away. Mendez was hit in the shoulder, yet he continued to shield his lieutenant with his own body until he was mortally wounded. Mendez was posthumously awarded the Navy Cross and promoted to sergeant. For saving the life of his platoon commander, Castille, U.S. Senator Charles Schumer recommended in 2003 that Mendez' award be upgraded to Medal of Honor.

Lance Corporal José L. Rivera, born in Ciales, Puerto Rico, was a member of Company L, 3rd Battalion, 5th Marines, 1st Marine Division (Reinforced), Fleet Marine Force. His parents moved from Puerto Rico to the United States and settled in Waukegan, Illinois. When the enemy forces threw a grenade at his position, he covered it with his helmet and smothered the explosion with his own body, thereby saving the lives of his comrades.

Corporal Miguel Rivera-Sotomayor, born in Philadelphia, Pa. to Puerto Rican parents, belonged to Company F, 2nd Battalion, 9th Marines, 3rd Marine Division. Rivera-Sotomayor silenced enemy machine guns and allowed his platoon to move from its pinned down position to establish an effective base of fire against the enemy.

== The Distinguished Service Cross ==
Seven Puerto Ricans were awarded the Distinguished Service Cross (DSC), the second highest military decoration of the United States Army, five of the awards were posthumous. Actions which merit the Distinguished Service Cross must be of such a high degree to be above those required for all other U.S. combat decorations but not meeting the criteria for the Medal of Honor. The recipients were:

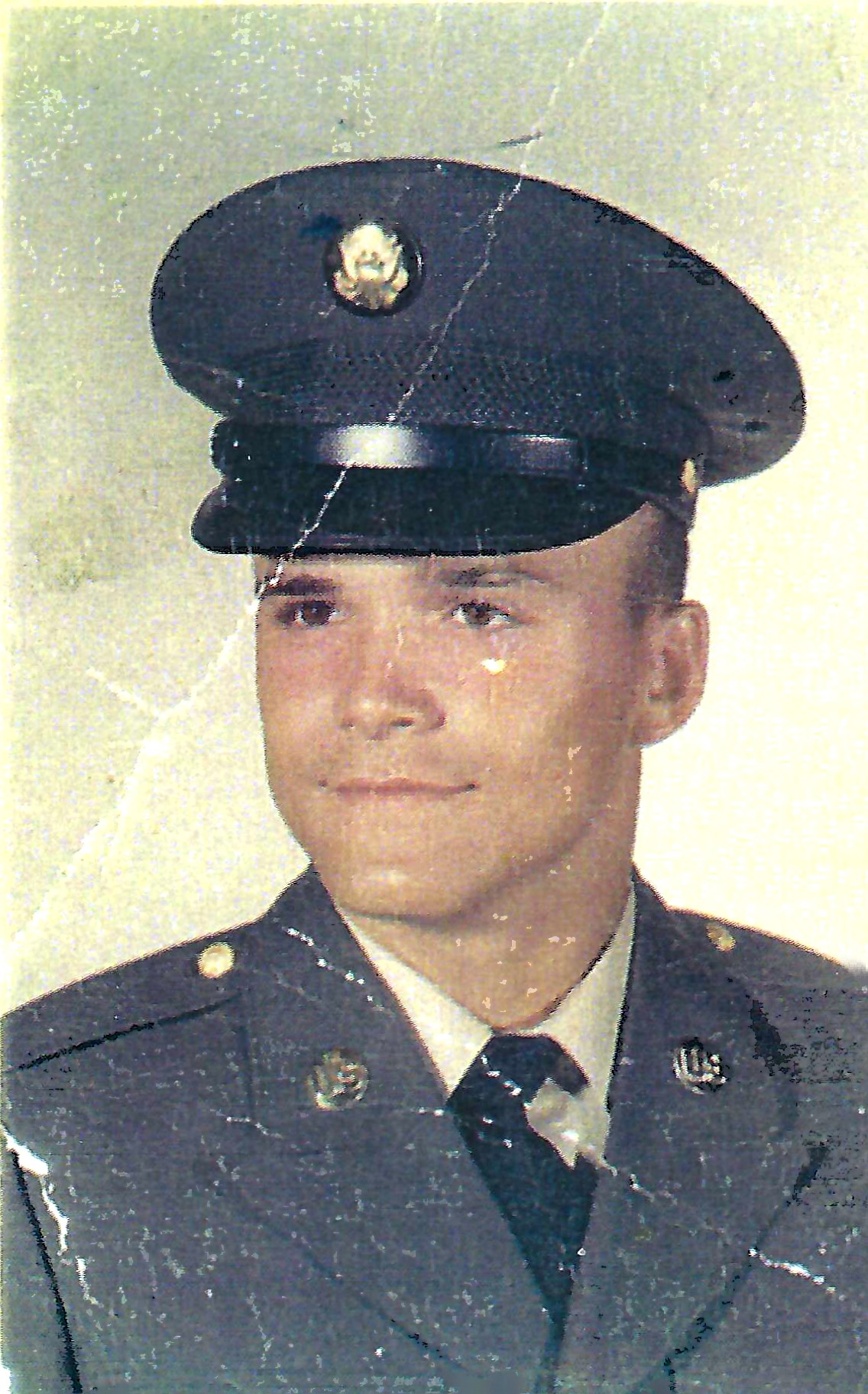
Sgt. Eddie E Chervony - Boot camp photo at Fort Ord, California, 1966

Sergeant Eddie E Chervony (died May 5, 1968) was born in Hormigueros, Puerto Rico. He was a member of Alpha Battery, 1st Battalion, 77th Field Artillery, 1st Cavalry Division. On separate trips, he evacuated five seriously wounded across one hundred meters of open terrain to a place of safety. When carrying a sixth man to the friendly lines he was cut off by enemy force and was attacked with grenades and satchel charges. While protecting his wounded companion from the satchel charge by covering him with his own body, he received a mortal wound.

Staff Sergeant Efraín Figueroa-Meléndez (died March 5, 1969) was born in Cataño, Puerto Rico. He was a member of Company D, 3d Battalion, 8th Infantry Regiment, 4th Infantry Division. On three occasions Staff Sergeant Figueroa-Meléndez purposely drew communist volleys on himself to permit his men to draw back to protected positions.

Spc4 Fruto James Oquendo (died May 6, 1969) of Puerto Rican descent, was born in New York City. Oquendo served with Company C, 2nd Battalion, 8th Cavalry Regiment, 1st Brigade of the 1st Cavalry Division. He was mortally wounded while defending his area during a hand-to-hand struggle.

Sergeant First Class Wilfredo Pagan-Lozada (died February 9, 1967) born in New York City to Puerto Rican parents, Pagan-Lozada served with Company D, 2nd Battalion, 5th Cavalry Regiment, 1st Cavalry Division. At the cost of his life, Pagan-Lozada, charged through enemy fire to save an officers life.

First Sergeant Ramiro Ramirez was a member of Company C, 1st Battalion, 18th Infantry Regiment, 2d Brigade, 1st Infantry Division. Despite being wounded Ramirez pulled one of his man to the safety of a bomb crater and refused aid until all others had been treated. Receiving word that another man had been severely wounded, he volunteered to rescue him and was hit in the arm and chest as he left the crater.

Private First Class Reinaldo Rodríguez (died January 15, 1971) was born in Guanica, Puerto Rico. He belonged to Company C, 1st Battalion, 27th Infantry Regiment, 2d Brigade, 25th Infantry Division. Rodriguez provided cover fire for his comrades maintaining suppressive fire upon the adversary until he was wounded a third time. Although evacuated immediately to the rear medical facilities, he succumbed to his wounds.

Corporal Aristides Sosa (died March 2, 1968) was born in Puerto Rico. His parents moved to New York City in 1947 when he was one year old. In 1967, he received a draft notice while attending Baruch College of Business Administration. He was drafted into the Army and served in Company A, 65th Engineer Battalion, 25th Infantry Division. On March 2, 1968, Sosa rolled on top of a grenade to save another soldier from its blast and was mortally wounded by the exploding grenade.

=== The most decorated soldier ===
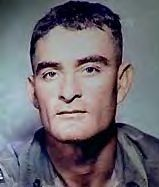
Sergeant First Class Jorge Otero Barreto

Jorge Otero Barreto was born in the town of Vega Baja, Puerto Rico, the son of Eloy Otero-Bruno and Crispina Barreto-Torres. His father named him "Jorge", Spanish for George, after George Washington whom Otero-Bruno admired. He joined the Army, which he chose over medical school in Spain. After his basic training, he continued to train with the 101st Airborne Division at Fort Campbell, Kentucky.

From 1961 to 1970, Otero Barreto served five tours in Southeast Asia, starting as an advisor who helped train South Vietnamese troops. Barreto served in various military units during his military career, specifically the 101st Airborne Division, the 25th Infantry Division, the 82nd Airborne Division and the 173rd Airborne Brigade. He participated in 200 combat missions and was wounded five times.

Otero Barreto was awarded 38 military decorations. Among his decorations are 2 Silver Stars, 5 Bronze Stars with Valor, 4 Army Commendation Medals, 5 Purple Hearts and 5 Air Medals. Otero Barreto has been called "the most decorated Puerto Rican veteran."

== Missing in Action ==
A total of 18 Puerto Ricans were listed as Missing in Action (MIA). This number does not include those who resided in the United States mainland, only those who resided in Puerto Rico. PFC. Humberto Acosta-Rosario is the only one whose body has never been recovered and is currently still listed as MIA.

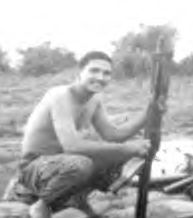
PFC Humberto Acosta-Rosario

PFC Humberto Acosta-Rosario was born and raised in the city of Mayagüez, Puerto Rico, which is located in the western coast of Puerto Rico. He joined the Army after graduating from high school. He was a member of Company B, 1st Battalion, 5th Infantry (Mechanized); 25th Infantry Division. On August 22, 1968, Acosta-Rosario accompanied some members of his unit during a reconnaissance mission. His unit was attacked by PAVN regulars in the vicinity of Bến Củi Rubber Plantation, east of Tay Ninh City, Tay Ninh Province. His unit, Company B, was forced to withdraw from the battlefield under heavy enemy attack. The unit regrouped and discovered that Acosta-Rosario and another machine gunner, PFC Philip T. DeLorenzo, Jr., were missing. Acosta-Rosario's platoon sergeant stated that he believed Acosta-Rosario had been hit by enemy fire prior to the unit's withdrawal.

The PAVN forces were driven back after artillery fire and helicopter gunships were called in and Company B returned to its original position. An extensive ground search was conducted by members of Company B for the two missing soldiers. The only body recovered was that of DeLorenzo, along with the two M60 machine guns. A search by two battalions who were brought in to sweep the area of only enemy activity did not produce Acosta-Rosario's body and he was officially listed as MIA.

Friendly forces captured documents from the PAVN 7th Infantry Division dated August 23, 1968. The documents were analyzed by U.S. intelligence agencies. The reports documented that Acosta-Rosario was in fact captured by PAVN forces. However, the U.S. military chose not to upgrade his status to Prisoner of War.

Acosta-Rosario's name was listed in the United States Government's "Last Known Alive" list. This list, which was released by the U.S. Government in April 1991, includes missing Americans whom the U.S. believed might have survived their initial loss incident. In March 1978, Acosta-Rosario was declared dead/body not recovered based on a presumptive finding of death.

Acosta-Rosario was posthumously promoted to the rank of Staff Sergeant. His name is on panel 47W, line 030 of the Vietnam Memorial Wall in Washington, D.C. and he is also list in El Monumento de la Recordación located in San Juan, Puerto Rico. There is a headstone with his name inscribed Plot: MB 0 6 of the Puerto Rico National Cemetery in Bayamón, Puerto Rico.

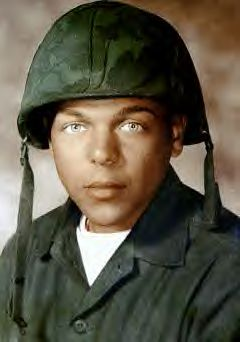
PFC Jose Ramon Sanchez

PFC. Jose Ramon Sanchez born in Brooklyn, NY was assigned to Company D, 1st Battalion, 4th Marines, 3rd Marine Division. On June 6, 1968, his unit was participating in Operation Robin in the rugged jungle covered mountains southwest of Khe Sanh, Quảng Trị Province. After Landing Zone Loon had been attacked by a PAVN force earlier that day Company D was being extracted by a CH-46A Sea Knight helicopter. As the helicopter gained altitude, it was hit by ground fire causing it to crash onto an east–west mountain ridgeline, roll down to the bottom of the hill and burst into flames. Within an hour and a half, a search and recovery team was inserted into the crash site. Of the 13 of the 23 Marines aboard who were killed, four were reported as MIA/KIA, besides Sanchez the other three were L/Cpls LaPlant, Palacios and Harper. Various attempts to recover the bodies of the four were made to no avail.

In 2006, a team began excavating the site and recovered human remains and non-biological material evidence including La Plant's identification tag. While at the site, a Vietnamese citizen turned over to the team human remains that he claimed to have found amid the wreckage. In 2007, another team completed the excavation and recovered additional human remains, life support material and aircraft wreckage. On November 5, 2008, The Department of Defense POW/Missing Personnel Office (DPMO) announced that the remains of four U.S. servicemen, including Sanchez, were identified. The remains of the four men share a single casket along with a box engraved with their names which was buried with full military honors at Arlington National Cemetery.

== Racial tensions of the 1960s ==
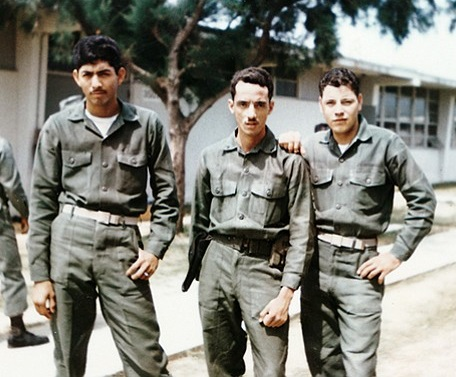
"On Two Fronts: Latinos & Vietnam" (L to R) PFC Herrera, L/Cpl Santiago, PFC Garza

The Vietnam War coincided with the protests of the Civil Rights Movement during the 1960s America. Minority groups, such as Hispanics were discriminated at home, but also within the U.S. armed forces. According to a study made in 1990, by the Department of Psychiatry, Columbia University, Department of Epidemiology, Mailman School of Public Health, Columbia University, and New York State Psychiatric Institute; called the National Survey of the Vietnam Generation (NSVG), Hispanics, among them Puerto Ricans, were younger than both Black and White majority veterans when they went to Vietnam. Hispanics experienced more prejudice and discrimination in Vietnam than Blacks. Minority groups would often band together with those of their own racial or ethnic backgrounds. One such group was "Puerto Rican Power in Unity" which eventually became "Latin Power in Unity." The objective of this group was to unite all the Hispanic Marines regardless of their national background, as a brotherhood. Together they shared their cultures and demanded to be treated equally as their Black and White counterparts in the military.

== Cultural representations ==
On September 22, 2015, the Public Broadcasting Service (PBS) documentary. "On Two Fronts: Latinos & Vietnam" by producer Mylène Moreno of Souvenir Pictures, Inc., aired nationwide on PBS and is part of PBS Stories of Service. Former Marine Lance Corporal Tony Santiago narrated the Puerto Rican experience during both the home-front and the battle grounds during the Vietnam War.

== Aftermath ==
El Monumento de la Recordación

On April 23, 1975, President Gerald Ford gave a televised speech declaring an end to the Vietnam War. During the Vietnam War, an estimated 48,000 Puerto Ricans served in the four branches of the armed forces. Some sources state that a total of 345 Puerto Ricans who resided in the island died in combat, however according to a report by the Department of Defense, titled "Number of Puerto Ricans serving in the U.S. Armed Forces during National Emergencies" the total number of Puerto Ricans who died was 455 and that were wounded was 3,775. Because of lack of separate documentation, the total number of Puerto Ricans who lived in the mainland United States and perished is unknown. At the time, Puerto Ricans were not tabulated separately, but were generally included in the general white population census count. Separate statistics were kept for African Americans and Asian Americans. The names of those who perished are inscribed in both the Vietnam Veterans Memorial located in Washington, D.C. and in El Monumento de la Recordación (The Wall of Remembrance) located in San Juan, Puerto Rico.

According to a study made by the Department of Epidemiology and Public Health and the Department of Psychiatry, Yale University, Puerto Rican Vietnam veterans, have a higher risk for posttraumatic stress disorder (PTSD) and experience more severe PTSD symptoms than non-Hispanic white Vietnam veterans. However, despite the hardships suffered by the experiences of war, many went on to live normal everyday lives. Among the Puerto Ricans who served in Vietnam and held important presidential administrative positions in the Administration of President George W. Bush were Major General William A. Navas Jr., who was awarded the Bronze Star Medal and was named Assistant Secretary of the Navy on June 6, 2001 and Dr. Richard Carmona, a former Green Beret who was awarded two Purple Hearts and was appointed Surgeon General in March 2002.

== See also ==
- Military history of Puerto Rico
- History of Puerto Ricans
- On Two Fronts: Latinos & Vietnam
- Puerto Rican Campaign
- Puerto Ricans in World War I
- Puerto Ricans in World War II
- 65th Infantry Regiment in the Korean War
- Puerto Rican women in the military
- List of Puerto Rican military personnel
- Puerto Ricans Missing in Action in the Vietnam War
