= David M. Gonzales =

United States Army Medal of Honor recipient

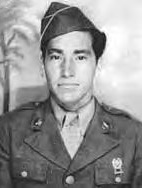
- Pvt. David M. Gonzales, Medal of Honor recipient
- Born: June 9, 1923; Pacoima, California, U.S.
- Died: April 25, 1945 (aged 21); Luzon, Philippines
- Burial place: New Calvary Catholic Cemetery, San Fernando, California
- Military career
- Allegiance: United States of America
- Branch: United States Army
- Service years: 1944–1945
- Rank: Private First Class
- Units: 127th Infantry, 32nd Infantry Division
- Conflicts: World War II: Battle of Luzon †
- Awards: Medal of Honor; Bronze Star; Purple Heart

Private First Class David M. Gonzales (June 9, 1923 – April 25, 1945) was a United States Army soldier who posthumously received the Medal of Honor, the United States' highest military decoration, for his actions during World War II. On April 25, 1945, at age 21, PFC Gonzales was killed in action in the Philippines while, in the face of enemy machine gunfire, digging out fellow soldiers who had been buried in a bomb explosion.

== Early years ==
Gonzales, a Mexican-American, was a semi-skilled machine shop worker in Los Angeles when he joined the U.S. Army in San Pedro, California in March 1944.

== World War II ==
On April 25, 1945, Gonzales' company found itself engaged in combat against Japanese forces at Villa Verde Trail on Luzon island in the Philippines. The Army Air Corps was using a tactic called "skip bombing" and were fusing the bombs for delayed action detonation to destroy the labyrinth of Japanese caves and tunnels in the northern Luzon campaign. This fusing allowed the bomb to bury itself deeply into the ground prior to detonation. This event trapped five American soldiers in their standing foxholes.

On December 8, 1945, President Harry S. Truman, posthumously awarded the Medal of Honor to Gonzales, presenting the medal to his surviving family. On February 2, 1949, Gonzales' body arrived in a funeral train to San Fernando, California, where he was buried.

=== Medal of Honor citation ===

Pvt. David M. Gonzales

Rank and organization: Private First Class, U.S. Army, Company A, 127th Infantry, 32d Infantry Division.
Place and date: Villa Verde Trail, Luzon, Philippine Islands, April 25, 1945.
Entered service at: Pacoima, California
Birth: Pacoima, California
G.O. No: 115, December 8, 1945.
Citation:

He was pinned down with his company. As enemy fire swept the area, making any movement extremely hazardous, a 500-pound bomb smashed into the company's perimeter, burying 5 men with its explosion. Pfc. Gonzales, without hesitation, seized an entrenching tool and under a hail of fire crawled 15 yards to his entombed comrades, where his commanding officer, who had also rushed forward, was beginning to dig the men out. Nearing his goal, he saw the officer struck and instantly killed by machinegun fire. Undismayed, he set to work swiftly and surely with his hands and the entrenching tool while enemy sniper and machinegun bullets struck all about him. He succeeded in digging one of the men out of the pile of rock and sand. To dig faster he stood up regardless of the greater danger from so exposing himself. He extricated a second man, and then another. As he completed the liberation of the third, he was hit and mortally wounded, but the comrades for whom he so gallantly gave his life were safely evacuated. Pfc. Gonzales' valiant and intrepid conduct exemplifies the highest tradition of the military service.

== After the war ==
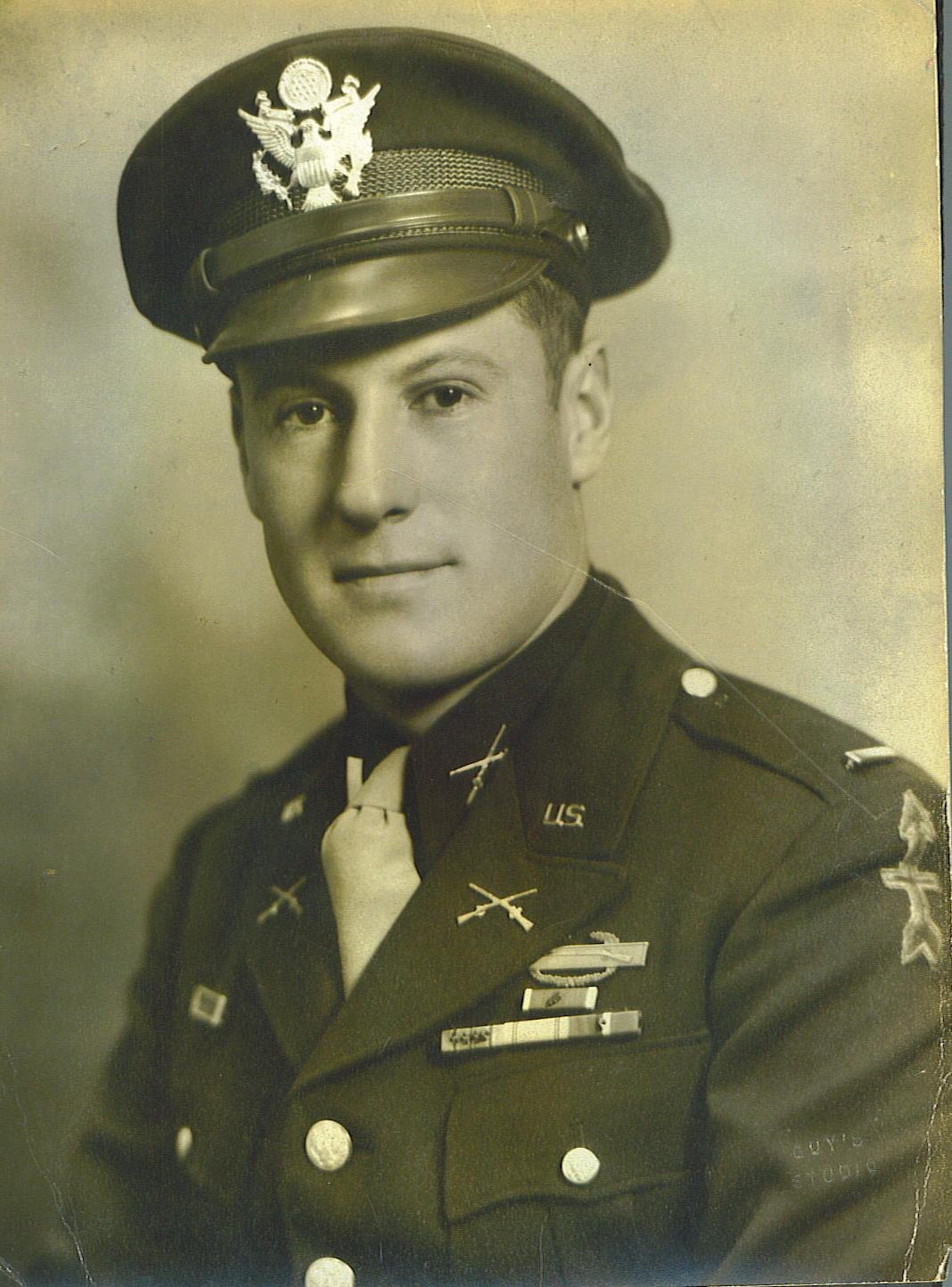
Lt. William W. Kouts

In 1999, David Gonzales, Jr. and his wife Bea attended a ceremony for war heroes in Santa Ana, California. There, they discovered that the picture the Army was sending out to military ceremonies was not of his father, but of someone else. Gonzales Jr. wrote to the Army in Washington, D.C. to tell them of their mistake, but did not receive a response. He then wrote to Congressman Howard Berman, who in turn referred the letter to his aide Fred Flores. Flores, who was also from Pacoima, California, immediately called Pentagon officials and had them correct the mistake. However, Flores found out that the family had only been presented with a Medal of Honor and a duplicate Purple Heart — the original one was stolen – and he realized that Gonzales had earned many other medals.

During a November 7, 2002, ceremony at Los Angeles Mission College, Congressman Berman presented David Gonzales, Jr. the following medals earned by his father: the Bronze Star, the Purple Heart, the World War II Victory Medal, the Asiatic-Pacific Campaign Medal with two Bronze Service Stars, the Philippine Liberation Medal, the World War II Honorable Service Lapel Button, the Combat Infantryman Badge, and the Expert Rifle Badge. Finally, he presented the Gold Star Lapel Button, which identifies the next of kin of members of the military who lost their lives while engaged in action.

The photo of a soldier who was not Gonzales, but identified as that of the medal winner, had been erroneously displayed in the Pentagon's Hall of Heroes. This was removed and replaced with a correct one of Gonzales after the renovations of the Pentagon – made necessary by the 9/11 attack – were completed on March 31, 2003.

== Reunion between the Gonzales and Kouts families ==
(L-R) Tony the Marine, W. Kouts and D. Gonzales, Jr.

On March 20, 2007, Maribeth Kouts, the daughter of William Kouts, posted the following message on Wikipedia:

"my father, William Kouts, was the soldier David M. Gonzales was digging out when he was shot and killed by sniper fire. My Dad is 85 and in ill health and we want to get into contact with the Gonzales family before Dad's passing so that Dad can tell David Jr. of his father's heroics firsthand.Mbkouts"

Marine Tony Santiago responded to the message and told Maribeth that he would try to help her in their quest. Santiago sent e-mails to Congressman Howard Berman and telephoned every David Gonzales in the Los Angeles area without any luck. Santiago then placed a message in Somos Primos, a Hispanic heritage cultural magazine, and a few weeks later on April 11, Santiago made contact with Ernestine Gonzales, cousin of David Gonzales Jr. As a result, both families met in the Atlanta suburb of Powder Springs, Georgia for the first time a month later on May 24. The event brought closure to over 60 years of searching for the relatives of David M. Gonzales on behalf of William W. Kouts. Beatrice Gonzales, David's daughter-in-law, said, "We feel so much peace because David's father died to save a very good man who lived a good life." Maribeth Kouts said, "We owe so much to Mr. Santiago."

== In Memoriam ==
In honor of Gonzales, Pacoima Park in Los Angeles County, California was renamed David M. Gonzales/Pacoima Recreational Center. The local Army recruiting station there also carries his name, as does a county Probation Department camp in Malibu.

In November 2015, the interchange between the 5 and 118 freeways in Los Angeles' San Fernando Valley was renamed the David M. Gonzales Memorial Interchange.

== Awards and recognitions ==
Among Pvt. David M. Gonzales' decorations and medals were the following:

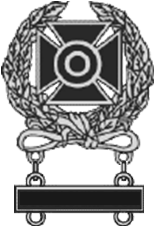

Badge	Combat Infantryman Badge		
1st row	Medal of Honor		
2nd row	Bronze Star Medal	Purple Heart	American Campaign Medal
3rd row	Asiatic-Pacific Campaign Medal with two bronze campaign stars	World War II Victory Medal	Philippine Liberation Medal
Badge	Weapons Qualification Badge		

== See also ==
- List of Medal of Honor recipients for World War II
- List of Hispanic Medal of Honor recipients
- Hispanic Americans in World War II
- Ysmael R. Villegas, also a 32nd Infantry Division Medal of Honor recipient
