= Jorge Otero Barreto =

Puerto Rican soldier (1937–2024)

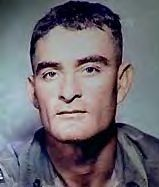
- Sergeant First Class Jorge Otero Barreto
- Born: 7 April 1937; Vega Baja, Puerto Rico
- Died: October 14, 2024 (aged 87)
- Burial place: Vega Baja New Municipal Cemetery
- Military career
- Allegiance: United States of America
- Branch: United States Army
- Service years: 1959–1970
- Rank: Sergeant First Class
- Units: 101st Airborne; 25th Infantry; 82nd Airborne; 173rd Airborne Brigade
- Conflicts: Vietnam War
- Awards: Silver Star Medal (2); Bronze Star Medal (5) w/ "V" Device; Air Medal (5); Army Commendation Medal (4); Purple Heart Medal (5)

Jorge A. Otero Barreto (7 April 1937 – 14 October 2024) was a former United States Army soldier. He earned 38 military decorations during his career. He received recognition from numerous organizations and had buildings named after him.

== Early years ==
Otero Barreto was born in the town of Vega Baja, Puerto Rico, the son of Eloy Otero-Bruno and Crispina Barreto-Torres. His father named him "Jorge", Spanish for George, after George Washington whom Otero-Bruno admired. Otero Barreto received his primary and secondary education in Vega Baja. He attended college at the University of Puerto Rico, studying biology for three years and spending another two years in training at the same school until September 1959 when he joined the U.S. Army, which he chose over medical school in Spain.

== U.S. Army service ==
After his basic training at Fort Jackson, he continued to train with the 101st Airborne Division at Fort Campbell, Kentucky. He left the Army in September 1961, but reenlisted in December 1961.

Barreto says that he joined the Wolfhounds, the 27th Infantry Regiment, 25th Infantry Division in Hawaii. From there he was assigned to Thailand where he served as a helicopter door-gunner.

=== Vietnam War ===
Barreto claims that he first served as an advisor who helped train South Vietnamese troops.

Barreto claims that on 5 August 1964 he participated in a mission to drop the Army of the Republic of Vietnam (ARVN) 7th Regiment near Hanoi, North Vietnam and multiple other missions into North Vietnam. He also claims that General William Westmoreland came to his unit and asked that he serve in Westmoreland's helicopter crew which he claims he did for 6–7 missions before he asked to return to combat operations. Barreto claims that on one mission his helicopter was engaged by a North Vietnamese Vietnam People's Air Force MiG-21 which pursued them along the Mekong River until the MiG crashed.

After returning to the US and training at Fort Campbell, Barreto says that he was assigned to the 4th Battalion, 503rd Infantry Regiment which then joined the 173rd Airborne Brigade in South Vietnam in 1966. Barreto says he received three Purple Hearts with the unit. Barreto claims that his first Purple Heart was for an injury in an airborne assault in Cambodia. He says that his second Purple Heart was for wounds in an operation in the Michelin Rubber Plantation. Barreto claims that: Alexander Haig wanted to join his reconnaissance platoon; his platoon were issued suicide pills in case they were facing capture; and that he mutilated the bodies of enemy soldiers and killed civilians.

Barreto says that he returned to Puerto Rico in June 1967 and in August reported to Fort Campbell where he was assigned to Company A, 1st Battalion (Airborne), 502nd Infantry Regiment, 2nd Brigade, 101st Airborne Division. After assaulting a sergeant and a captain, Barreto says he volunteered to return to Vietnam to avoid court-martial. In December 1967 he returned to South Vietnam. Barreto claims that he was one of the soldiers landed on the roof of the US embassy during the Tet offensive attack on US Embassy.

Barreto participated in 200 combat missions and was wounded five times.

Barreto was awarded 38 military decorations. Among his decorations are two Silver Stars, five Bronze Stars with Valor, four Army Commendation Medals, five Purple Hearts and five Air Medals. Otero Barreto has been called "the most decorated Puerto Rican veteran."

=== Silver Stars ===
Otero Barreto earned both his Silver Stars in the first months of 1968 as a member of Company A, 1st Battalion (Airborne), 502nd Infantry Regiment.

On 17 February, Otero Barreto's unit was operating near Quảng Trị as part of Operation Jeb Stuart, when they encountered concealed enemy positions and came under heavy fire. Then a staff sergeant, Otero Barreto took control of a machine gun (according to the Silver Star citation the gunner had been wounded and the assistant gunner killed) and covered the withdrawal of his platoon until he expended all the gun's ammunition. Wounded during the fight, he also organized the unit's orderly withdrawal from the area.

His second Silver Star was awarded less than three months later (1 May), and came during Operation Carentan II north of Huế. Still with Company A, although promoted to Platoon Sergeant, Otero Barreto's unit was occupying defensive positions near a village when they came under attack. According to the award citation, the attackers were part of the North Vietnamese People's Army of Vietnam (PAVN) 8th Battalion, 90th Regiment and were trying to break through the cordon established around the village. The attacks began at 04:15 and after three assaults failed the PAVN fell back into the village. According to the award citation, Otero Barreto led his squad into the village, neutralizing several defensive positions in the process, and positioned his squad to provide covering fire so the rest of the company could advance.

Otero Barreto later earned a Bronze Star with the Recon Platoon of Company E, 1st Battalion, 502nd Infantry Regiment for an action at Quảng Điền on 3 December 1968.

== Post-War Honors ==
On 22 June 2012, Otero Barreto was the keynote speaker at a Vietnam Veterans Memorial Dinner in Lorain, Ohio. On 1 September 2006, the Coalición Nacional Puertorriqueña (National Puerto Rican Coalition) honored Otero Barreto with a "Lifetime Achievement Award" in a Conference held at the Hilton Hotel in Chicago. The keynote speaker was U.S. Congressman Luis Gutierrez.

A transitional home for veterans in Springfield, Massachusetts, the SFC Jorge Otero-Barreto Homeless Veterans Transitional Home, was also named after Otero Barreto. The home is managed by the Vietnam Veterans of America Chapter #866 in Springfield, Massachusetts. The home is part of a program named the "Jorge Otero Barreto Homeless Veterans Transitional Program" which houses twelve (12) veterans. The program offers counseling, DVA services from the Western Massachusetts Bilingual Veterans Outreach Center, assistance in obtaining Chapter 115 financial assistance, AA/NA meetings, and Christian Rehabilitation Substance Abuse meetings.

He was post commander and service officer for many years at Vega Baja American Legion Post 14.

The town of Vega Baja dedicated its military museum to Otero Barreto and named it the "Jorge Otero Barreto Museum." On 2 October 2011, Otero Barreto was named Vegabajeño del Año en Civismo (Civic Citizen of Year of Vega Baja).

In June 2016, Lieutenant general Joseph Anderson presented the "Distinguished Member of the 502nd Infantry Regiment" award to Otero Barreto, honoring him for his valor in the Vietnam War. Otero Barreto's name is one of those displayed on a wall of honor at Fort Campbell.

In 2019 he was inducted to the Puerto Rico Veterans Hall of Fame.

In July 2026, the United States Veterans Hall of Fame announced that Otero Barreto had been selected for posthumous induction into its Class of 2027 in recognition of his military valor. Retired U.S. Army Colonel Arnaldo Claudio publicly announced the selection following the organization's board approval. Otero Barreto is scheduled to be inducted under the Valor category during the Hall of Fame's November 6, 2027 ceremony at the Raleigh Marriott City Center in Raleigh, North Carolina.

== Medal of Honor campaign (2026) ==
In 2026, a campaign seeking the posthumous award of the Medal of Honor to Otero Barreto gained congressional and national media attention. The initiative was led by U.S. Marine Corps combat veteran, business leader, and veterans advocate Jeffrey Rosales, working alongside retired U.S. Army Colonel Arnaldo Claudio, Otero Barreto's family, veterans organizations, and other supporters. These efforts led to the introduction of H.R. 9595, legislation introduced in the U.S. House of Representatives by Resident Commissioner Pablo José Hernández Rivera, with Representative Nydia Velázquez as an original cosponsor, to authorize the President to award Otero Barreto the Medal of Honor posthumously. As of November 2026, no final award determination had been publicly announced.

== Military decorations ==
Among SFC Otero Barreto's military decorations:

Badge	Combat Infantryman Badge		
1st Row	Silver Star Medal with one bronze oak leaf cluster		Bronze Star Medal with "V" device and one silver oak leaf cluster
2nd Row	Army Commendation Medal with "V" device and three oak leaf clusters	Air Medal with one silver oak leaf cluster	Purple Heart with four oak leaf clusters
3rd Row	Army Good Conduct Medal with three Good conduct loops	Armed Forces Expeditionary Medal	National Defense Service Medal
4th Row	Vietnam Service Medal with four bronze Service stars	Vietnam Gallantry Cross	Vietnam Campaign Medal

1st Row	Presidential Unit Citation	Valorous Unit Award	Meritorious Unit Commendation
2nd Row	Vietnam Presidential Unit Citation	Vietnam Civil Actions Medal Unit Citation	Vietnam Gallantry Cross Unit Citation

Badges

- Parachutist badge
- Basic Aviation Badge
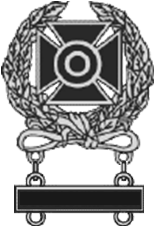
- Expert Rifle Marksmanship Badge

== See also ==
- List of Puerto Ricans
- List of Puerto Rican military personnel
- Puerto Ricans in the Vietnam War
