= Tony Santiago =

American military historian (born 1950)

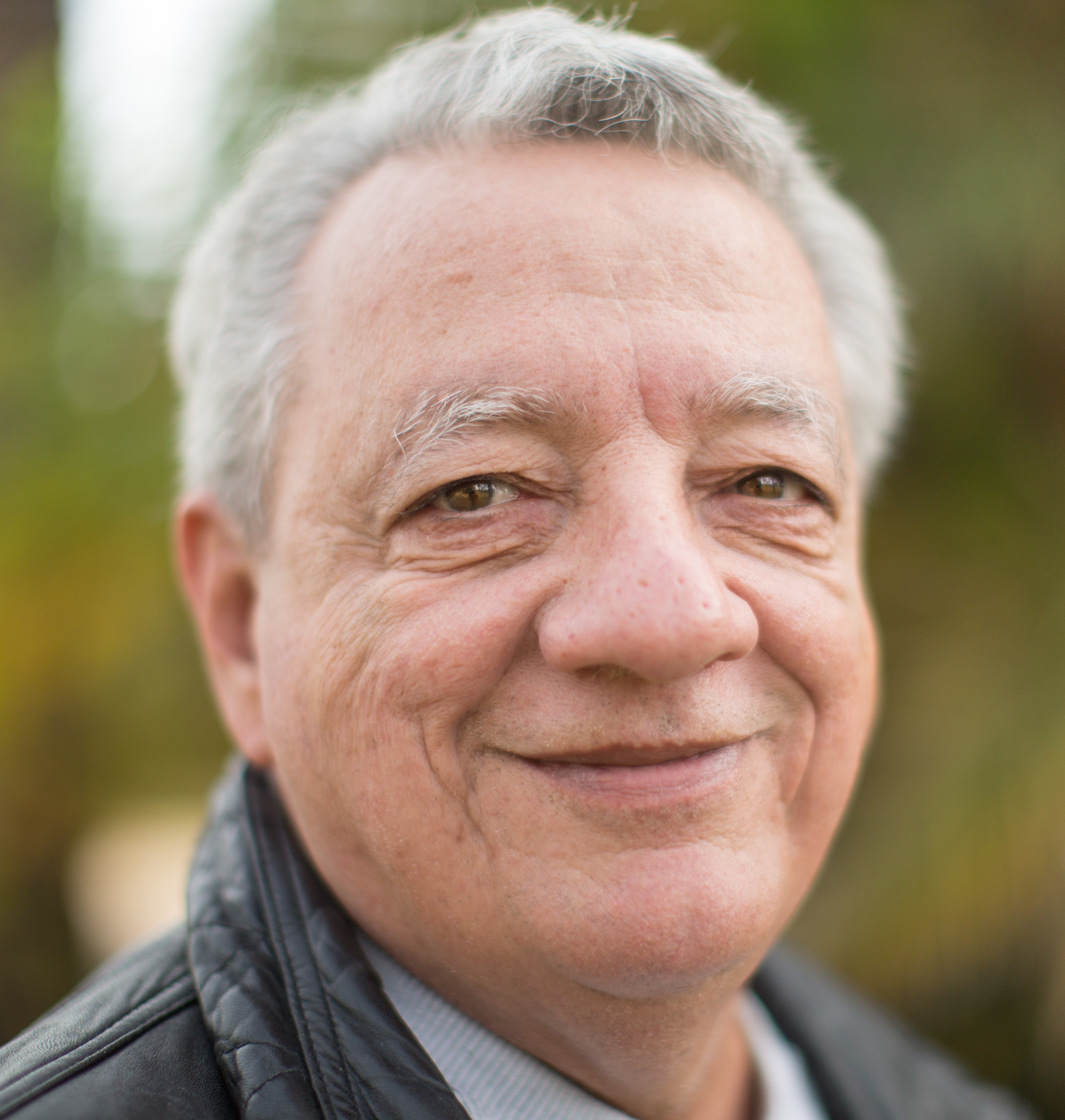
- Born: March 9, 1950 (age 76); New York City, U.S.
- Known for: Writing, military history, editing English Wikipedia
- Military career
- Allegiance: United States
- Branch: United States Marine Corps
- Service years: 1969-1975
- Rank: Lance Corporal
- Nickname: Tony the Marine
- Units: H & S Company, 2nd Battalion 9th Marines, 3rd Marine Division; Military Police
- Conflicts: Vietnam War

Antonio Santiago Rodríguez (Note: In this Spanish name, the first or paternal surname is Santiago and the second or maternal family name is Rodríguez.) (born March 9, 1950), nicknamed Tony the Marine, is an American Marine veteran, writer, and military historian from New York City, focused mostly on the military history of Puerto Rico and its service members.

Santiago was recognized by the 23rd Senate of Puerto Rico for being "one of the main contributors of content related to Puerto Rico in the open online encyclopedia known as Wikipedia". The Senate also recognized him as one of the main writers on subjects which relate to Puerto Rico, and an important historian of the Puerto Rican military experience. According to Phoebe Ayers, member of the Board of Trustees of the Wikimedia Foundation, this may be the first time that the English Wikipedia has been mentioned in a parliamentary or congressional resolution or a formal governmental award.

== Early years ==
Santiago was born in New York City, to Joaquín Santiago and Hilda Rodríguez-Mattei, both of Puerto Rican origin. Santiago graduated from high school in New York City and after being accepted to Columbia University, Santiago chose to serve in the U.S. Marine Corps instead.

== Military service ==
Santiago in Vietnam

Santiago served with the 2nd Battalion 9th Marines, 3rd Marine Division in the Vietnam War in the 81 MM Mortar, and later in the Military Police as well.

While in the Marines, Santiago perceived significant ethnic, racial, and national origin discrimination. In response to this, he formed an organization composed of American soldiers of Latino descent. The organization, named Latin Power in Unity, included soldiers of Puerto Rican, Mexican, Central American and other Latino backgrounds.

Santiago also developed a close friendship with Leroy Reese who had formed a similar organization named "Black Power" for Black soldiers. Both men worked closely for the equal treatment of minorities and to improve relations between their members and the members of other ethnic groups in their company. An interview about Santiago's experience in the military, collectively made by author Greg Boudonek and Santiago himself, was published in the book Puertorriquenos Who Served With Guts, Glory, and Honor: Fighting to Defend a Nation Not Completely Their Own.

Upon finishing his tour with the U.S. Marine Corps in 1975, Santiago enrolled at the Interamerican University in Bayamon, Puerto Rico. He graduated magna cum laude with a degree in Business Administration in 1979. In Puerto Rico, he met Milagros and married her in 1971 and had three children together.

== Military historian ==
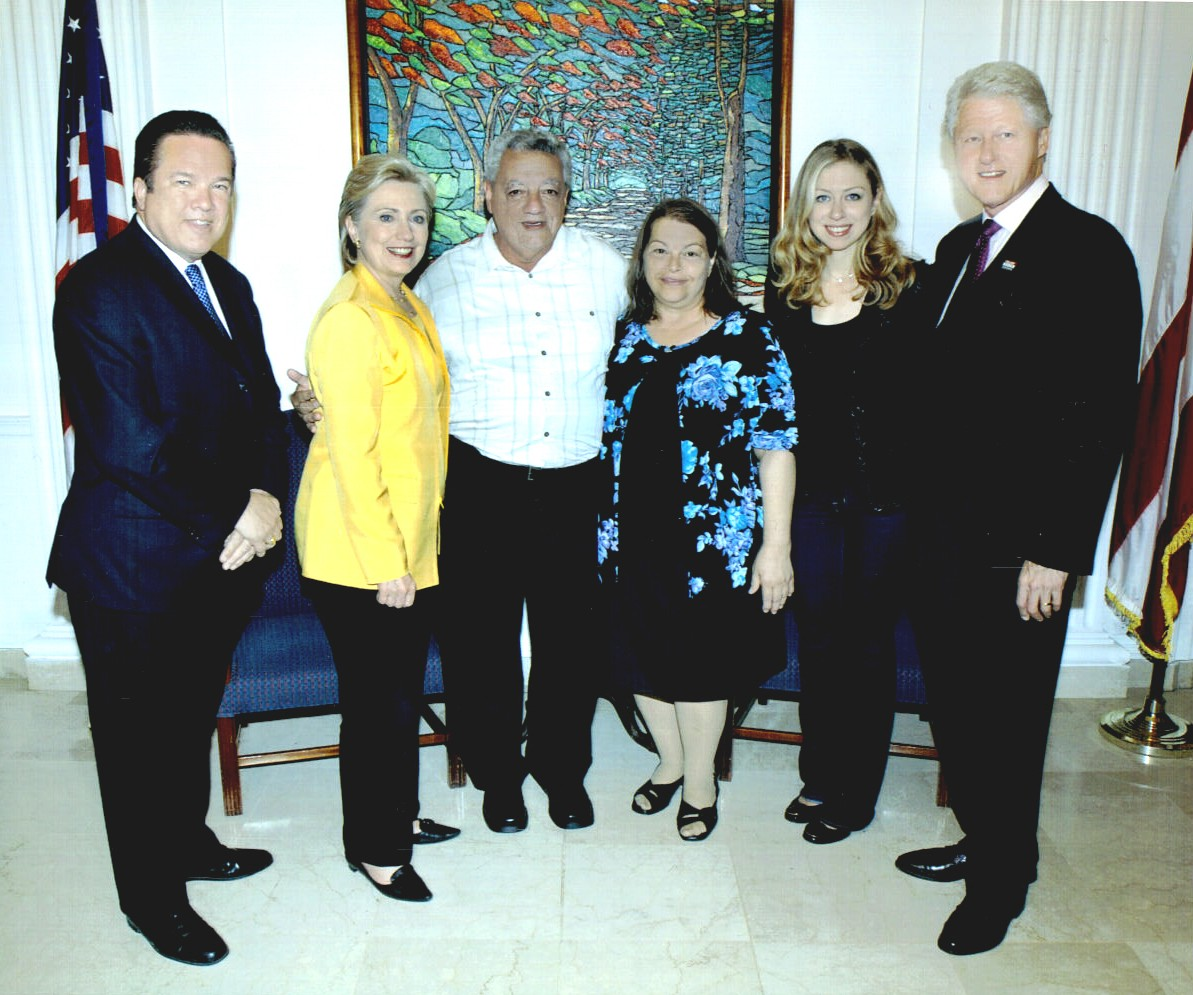
(L-R) President of the Puerto Rican Senate Kenneth McClintock, U.S. Secretary of State Hillary Clinton, Antonio, Milagros, Chelsea Clinton and former President of the U.S. Bill Clinton

In 1990, Santiago moved to Phoenix, Arizona, with his wife and children. At this point he reflected, "the only role models and heroes for Latino children were El Zorro, the Cisco Kid and Speedy Gonzales and," he said, "school textbooks failed to mention the many contributions that Latinos had made to the formation of our country [the United States]."

In response, Santiago began publishing a series of short articles about the contributions that Puerto Ricans had made to the American society. He is the editor of the Puerto Rican Military History Channel of the monthly internet magazine El Boricua, a staff writer in the internet magazine Somos Primos and the official historian of the Association of Naval Services Officers (ANSO).

His early published work focused on military history, but later he expanded his research and documentation to include many other facets of the Puerto Rican life experience.

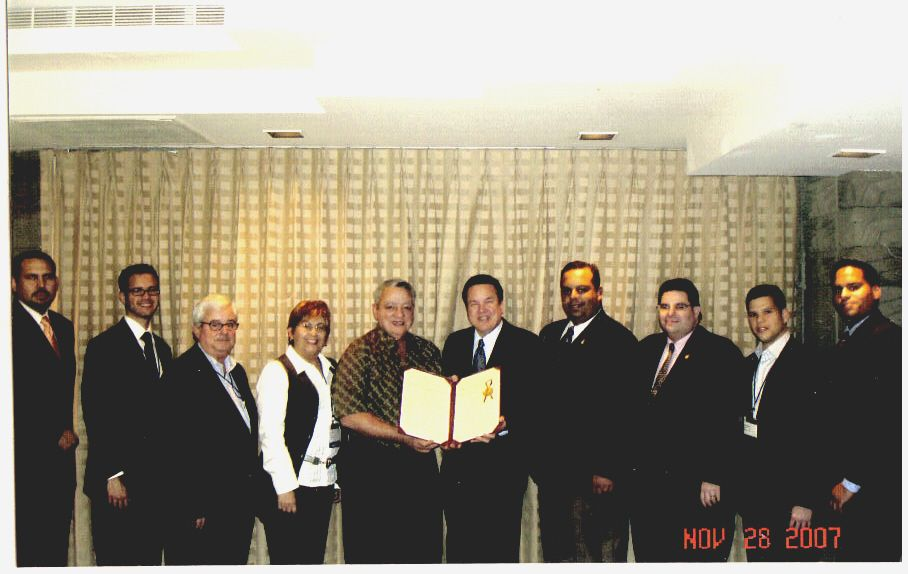
Members of the Puerto Rican Senate recognize Tony (The Marine) Santiago

In April 2010, Santiago discovered and wrote about Lt. Augusto Rodriguez, a Puerto Rican who served in the American Civil War. It was the first time that a link in the American Civil War was made between Puerto Rico and the United States. Rodriguez was thus the first known Puerto Rican veteran of the United States Armed Forces. The significance of this discovery is that, until then, it was believed that Puerto Ricans had not served in the United States military prior to World War I. Puerto Rico's Secretary of State, Kenneth D. McClintock, named Santiago "Puerto Rico's foremost military historian."

Santiago is among the people who were interviewed and who are featured in the documentary On Two Fronts: Latinos & Vietnam; directed and produced by Los Angeles-based filmmaker Mylene Moreno. The documentary, which aired on PBS on September 22, 2015, examines the Latino experience during the Vietnam War. He was interviewed, together with fellow veteran Oscar Urrea, by PBS Horizante host Jose Cardenas and Univision newscaster Jorge Valenzuela, where he expressed his personal experiences, prior to the showing of the documentary.

== Other works ==
In addition to his military history research and writing, Santiago is also a free lance photojournalist for The Arizona Republic. He is also a member of the national steering committee of "Borinqueneers Congressional Gold Medal Alliance," which sought the Congressional Gold Medal for Puerto Rico's 65th Infantry Regiment, and serves in the "Latino Alliance Advisory Board."

In page 263 of the acknowledgments section of the book War Against All Puerto Ricans, Revolution and Terror in America's Colony author and former representative to the New York State Assembly Nelson Antonio Denis wrote the following:

"Tony (the Marine) Santiago, creator of over six hundred Wikipedia articles on Puerto Rican history and biographies, was a key inspiration and advisor"

== Honors and awards ==
=== Accolades ===
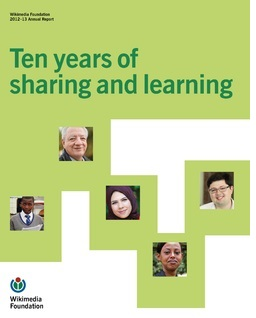
Cover of Wikimedia Foundation's 2012-2013 Annual Report

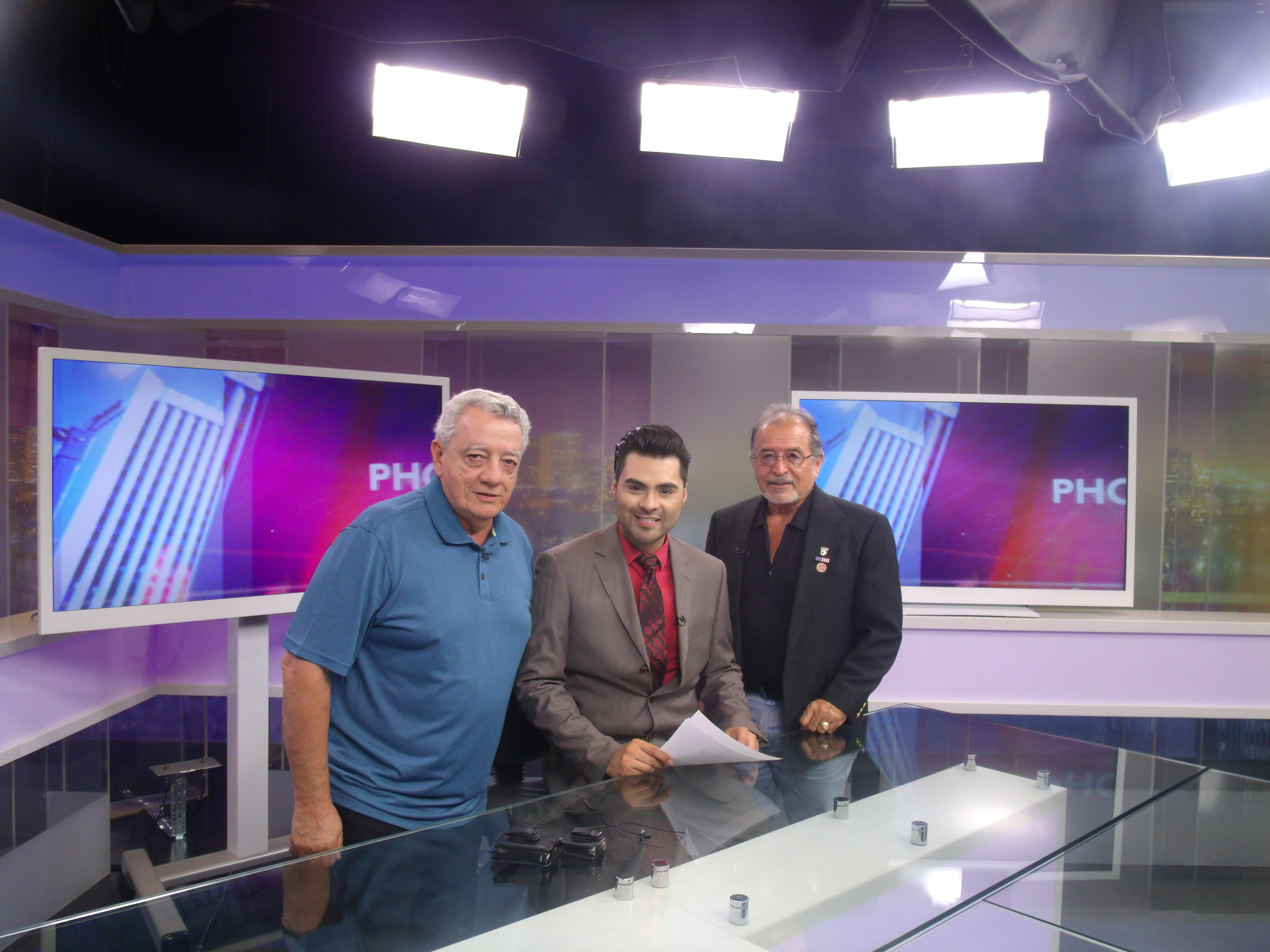
Tony Santiago (L), Oscar Urrea (R) and journalist Jorge Valenzuela (center), when interviewed in Univision

- On November 20, 2007, the Senate of Puerto Rico issued Resolution No. 3603 applauding Santiago's military legacy. The Resolution called Santiago "an important historian of Puerto Rican military contribution, [who] over the years has documented the history of Puerto Rican sacrifice and heroism in the battlefields using the internet, the Puerto Rican Military History Channel, the cultural magazine El Boricua and Somos Primos." According to Phoebe Ayers, member of the Board of Trustees of the Wikimedia Foundation, this may be the first time that Wikipedia has been mentioned in a parliamentary or congressional resolution of this type.
- On Memorial Day of 2008, Congressman Luis Fortuño read a statement about Tony the Marine into the U.S. Congressional Record. (Note: Fortuño (2008) "Today, the Senate of Puerto Rico recognizes a Puerto Rican who after serving as a Marine in Vietnam [...] has become Puerto Rico's most widely-read writer of the heroic accounts of Puerto Rico's military men and women.")
- On August 10, 2010, Puerto Rico's Secretary of State, Kenneth D. McClintock, named Santiago "Puerto Rico's foremost military historian."
- On August 28, 2012, the Latino Alliance named Santiago a "Champion of Character."
- On November 11, 2013 (Veteran's Day), Kenneth McClintock Hernández, the former Secretary of State and former president of the Senate of Puerto Rico, again gave special recognition to Santiago. McClintock honored him for documenting the sacrifice, and preserving the legacy, of Puerto Rican veterans throughout world history.
- In January 2014, the Wikimedia Foundation included Santiago's photo on the cover of their 2012-2013 Annual Report.
- In September 2015, Santiago (pictured in the middle) along with two other Marines, was featured on the cover of KQED Celebrates Latino Heritage Month magazine.
- In 2016, The Wikimedia Foundation revealed the most detailed featured articles in its site. According to the Wikimedia Foundation, Wikipedia's parent company, the article "The Military history of Puerto Rico" created by Santiago, is ranked #4 among the featured articles in depth and high quality. Santiago is credited by the foundby ation as being the person who mostly has maintained the articles' length and quality.
- His name is among those 41 million who are honored and whose names are inscribed on the National Military Monument which is located in Washington, DC.

=== Milestones as a Wikipedian ===
- Facilitating reunion with family of Medal of Honor recipient David M. Gonzales and William Kouts.
- Recognition by Congressman Luis Fortuño of Santiago's contribution to preserving the history of contributions of Puerto Rican's to the U.S. military.

Milestones as a Wikipedian
(L-R) Santiago with William Kouts and David Gonzales. JR.

Speech by U.S. Congressman Luis Fortuño, page 1

Speech by U.S. Congressman Luis Fortuño, page 2

== See also ==
- List of Puerto Ricans
- List of Wikipedia people
