= Delia Alvarez =

American county government official and anti-war activist

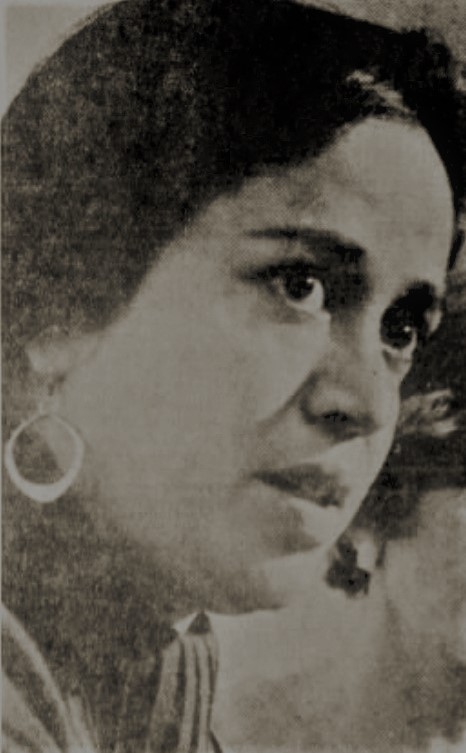
- Delia Alvarez, 1971
- Born: 1941 (age 83–84); California, United States
- Occupation(s): Former director of public health, Santa Clara County, California (1989–1993); Anti-war activist during the Vietnam War era (1964–1973)
- Years active: 1960s–1990s
- Known for: Protesting the Vietnamese government's detention of her older brother, U.S. Navy aviator Everett Alvarez Jr., as a prisoner of war

Delia Alvarez (born 1941) is a former American county government official and anti-war activist. A member of a Mexican American family from Salinas, California, she is a younger sister of Everett Alvarez Jr., who was the first United States pilot to be shot down during the Vietnam War and the American who was held in captivity as a prisoner of war (POW) for the second longest period of time during that war. She first rose to prominence in 1964 while protesting his detention and torture at Hỏa Lò Prison (dubbed the "Hanoi Hilton" by American POWs).

In 1979, she became "the highest-ranking Chicano in county government in Santa Clara County, California" when she was appointed as the county's acting director of personnel.

== Formative years and family ==
Born to a Mexican American family in 1941, Delia Alvarez is a daughter of Everett S. Alvarez Sr. (1917-2007) and Soledad R. Alvarez (1919-2003), and the younger sister of United States Navy fighter pilot Everett Alvarez Jr. Her father, Everett Sr., who was known to family and friends as "Lalo," was a welder employed by a munitions plant in the Salinas, California region where Delia and her siblings were raised. Their mother, who was known to family and friends as "Chole" or "Sally," had been a laborer employed on the farms and in the canneries of the same region since she was eleven years old. After earning her Associate of Arts (A.A.) degree during the 1970s, Sally Alvarez became a teacher's aide in the Santa Clara School District.

Delia Alvarez subsequently graduated from Salinas High School and San Jose State College (now San Jose State University).

== Anti-war activism ==
On August 5, 1964, Delia Alvarez's older brother, Everett Alvarez Jr., became the first United States pilot to be shot down during the Vietnam War. His U.S. Navy jet was damaged by anti-aircraft fire during Operation Pierce Arrow, which was conducted three days after the Gulf of Tonkin incident. Captured by the Vietnamese Navy, he was transported to the Hỏa Lò Prison (which was later nicknamed as the "Hanoi Hilton" by subsequent American prisoners of war). Interrogated and tortured by his captors, he was also filmed for propaganda purposes.

Back home in the United States, Delia Alvarez and her family were initially relieved to learn that their son and brother was alive. His capture was confirmed for the family by a video of him that aired on an NBC News program on November 11, 1964, which showed him "still dressed in his full flight suit being marched down a street at bayonet point by a North Vietnamese sailor" and "with his fight helmet off, undergoing interrogation by a North Vietnamese officer."

Their relief turned to fear, frustration and anger, however, as his imprisonment dragged on, turning Everett Jr. into the second-longest American to be held captive as a POW during the war. During a 1989 Washington Post interview, Delia Alvarez described how she and her mother evolved into anti-war activists:

"'The first few years, we were the good military family…. You have to go back in time, about 25 years or so, and in those days, you didn't question what the government was saying. But with the changes going on in the country, it became harder to accept—there were questions that were not being answered, and there were a lot of answers that just didn't make sense.'"

In 1969, Delia Alvarez launched a nationwide petition drive with her mother and began attending local, state, national and international protest events. Her brother was finally released by the Vietnamese government on February 12, 1973, after more than eight years in captivity.

== Public service career ==
During the late 1960s, Delia Alvarez was employed by the government of Santa Clara County as a social worker. She also traveled to "England, the Scandinavian countries, the Netherlands, Germany, Switzerland and France" before visiting Sweden and southern Europe during the winter and early spring of 1967.

In 1975, Alvarez was employed as an administrative analyst with the Santa Clara County Executive Office. On January 21 of that year, she participated as a panelist at the Chicana Consciousness and Liberation conference at Stanford University. In 1976, while still employed as an administrative analyst for the executive office, she was assigned to the county's effort to plan and implement a county Health Services Agency that would be funded and operated by the county with financial help from the federal government.

In October 1979, Alvarez became "the highest-ranking Chicano in county government in Santa Clara County, California" when she was appointed as the county's acting director of personnel.

By September 1989, Alvarez had been promoted to the position of director of public health for the County of Santa Clara, which faced financial difficulties due to state and nationwide economic problems that caused a tax revenue shortfall for counties. By 1993, county leaders were directing department heads to find areas where budget reductions could be made. In response, Alvarez proposed nearly one million dollars in cuts to a series of county programs that had been designed to address the HIV/AIDS epidemic. She recommended the elimination of funding for early intervention clinic staff, HIV outreach education programs, family planning services, housing assistance programs for people with HIV/AIDS, and medical treatment and counseling for more than one thousand newly diagnosed HIV/AIDS patients, reductions that would have taken "the County's commitment to AIDS back to the level of 1985, when the County first funded AIDS services," according to Ken Yeager, a trustee of the San Jose Evergreen Community College District in 1992 and later a Santa Clara County supervisor from 2006 to 2018.

During this same period, Alvarez and her family were still being asked by news media to talk about their experiences during Everett Alvarez Jr.'s time as a POW.

In March 1993, Alvarez retired from her job as the county's director of public health. She was fifty-one years old.

== Later life ==
Alvarez's mother, Soledad, died in Santa Clara, California on March 17, 2003. In 2015, Alvarez and her family were profiled in the PBS documentary, On Two Fronts: Latinos & Vietnam.
