= Veteran's Heritage Project =

Veterans Heritage Project (VHP) is a nonprofit organization (501(c)(3)) based in Phoenix, Arizona whose mission is to "Connect Students with Veterans™ in order to Honor Veterans, Preserve America's Heritage and Develop Future Leaders."

The program engages middle school, high school, and college students with military veterans who share their personal stories of combat in World War II, the Cold War, the Korean War, the Vietnam War, Desert Storm, Desert Shield, and other U.S. conflicts to serve as historical primary sources.

== History ==
VHP was founded in 2004 by Barbara Hatch, a social studies teacher at Cactus Shadows High School in Cave Creek, Arizona, as an after-school club.

In 1998, after her students saw the film Saving Private Ryan, Hatch reached out to a local Veterans of Foreign Wars Post in search of a Normandy veteran who would be willing to share his story. In 2004, she received a grant from the Salt River Project to expand the program.

In February 2017, Hatch was honored by Arizona Humanities with the 2017 Friend of the Humanities Award. In March 2018, VHP was selected from among 20 finalists in a nationwide program to receive the Community Service Hero Award by the Congressional Medal of Honor Society. In December 2018, Hatch was awarded the Vietnam Veterans of America Achievement Medal by the American Council of the Vietnam Veterans of America.

== Recordings ==
The oral histories are recorded and then published in numbered hard-cover volumes entitled Since You Asked™ and archived along with videotapes in the Library of Congress in Washington, D.C. as part of the Veterans History Project, which was created by the United States Congress in 2000. The VHP database can be searched online and viewed by appointment in the American Folklife Center Reading Room in the Jefferson Building of the Library of Congress. Each volume costs approximately $15,000 to publish, the cost of which is offset by donated tax credits. The first edition, Since You Asked: Arizona Veterans Share Their Memories, was published in 2005 and included sixty-five interviews. Annual scholarships are awarded to students who demonstrate excellence and exceptional dedication to their project. As of April 2018, 1,779 students had participated in the program, documenting the stories of 1,824 veterans. The program is active in 25 school chapters located in 17 Arizona cities.
