= Elise Solberg =

Japanese-American pianist and songwriter

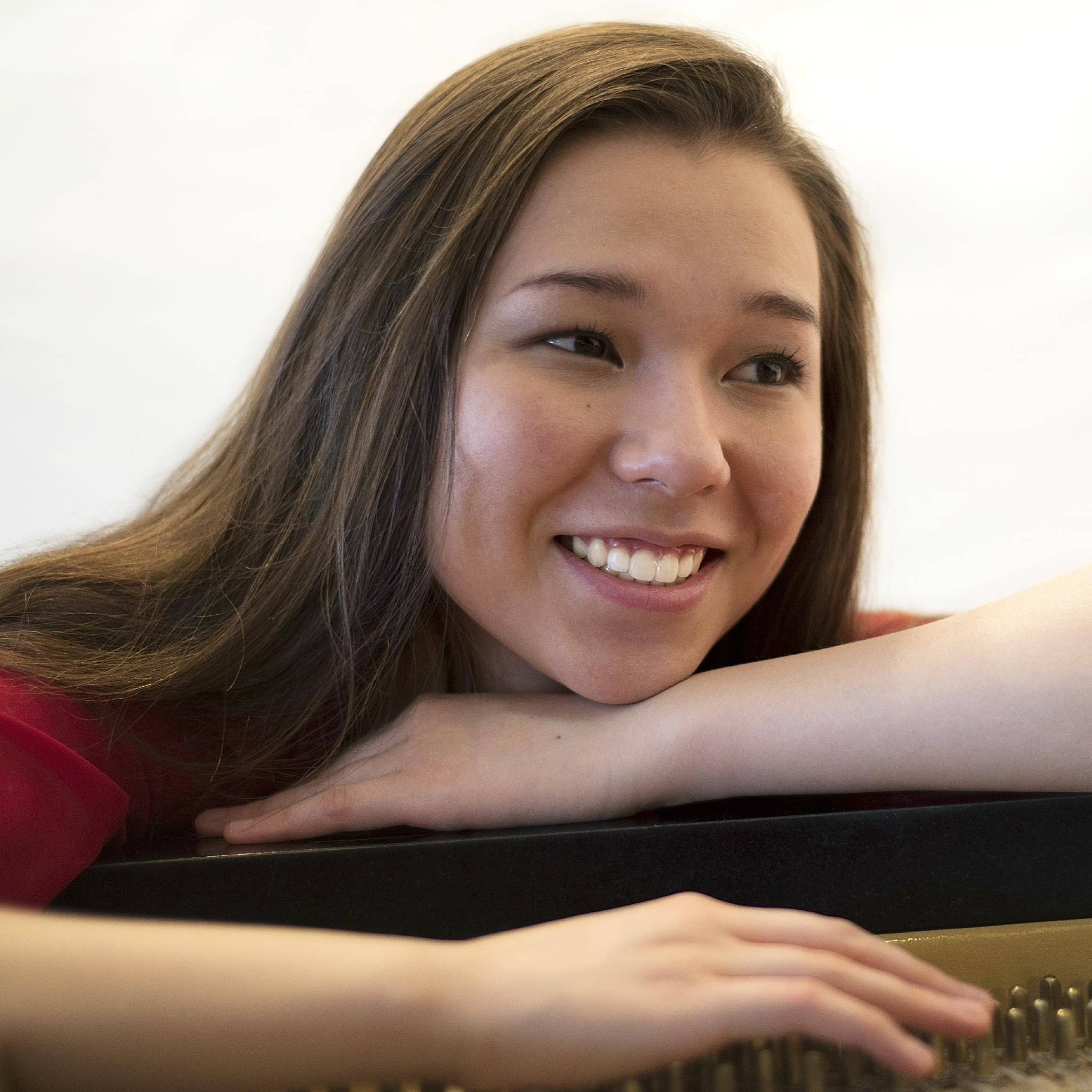
- Born: Tokyo, Japan
- Education: USC Thornton School of Music
- Occupations: musician; pianist; composer; songwriter
- Years active: 2018–present
- Musical career
- Website: www.elisesolberg.com

Elise Solberg is a Japanese-American pianist, composer, and songwriter. She is best known for playing keyboards with Chloe x Halle, Chloe Bailey and Beyoncé's 2022 Oscar performance. Solberg is the founder of Turn Up Her Mic.

== Early life and education ==
Elise Solberg was born in Tokyo, Japan, the daughter of Yoshiko née Arino and Tait Solberg, both musicians. Her father was Chief Master Sergeant of the U.S. Air Force Band of the Pacific-Asia, Yokota Air Base, stationed in Japan. He played saxophone and was a multi-instrumentalist performing all over the world. Elise Solberg accompanied her father to local performances in Japan, which inspired her to pursue a career as pianist. At seven years old, she began studying piano at the Yamaha Advanced Piano Academy in Tokyo.

Upon retiring from the Air Force, Tait Solberg moved his family to Denver. Solberg studied classical music with Dr. Fifi Hut, Dr. Richard Holbrook, and Larry Graham, all of whom who encouraged her to enter competitions and music festivals. She won competitions sponsored by Yamaha, Kawai and Steinway. Solberg attended the International Institute of Musicians for three years. She won first prize in the Schmitt Music Competition in 2014.

Solberg attended and graduated from the University of Southern California in 2018. While at USC, she won prizes in the Sigma Alpha Iota competition and the Rio Hondo Young Artists competition. She studied piano and composition with Russell Ferrante, Stewart Gordon and Patrice Rushen.

== Career ==
=== Beyoncé ===
In 2022 Solberg played piano with Beyoncé for her "Be Alive" performance at the 94th Academy Awards.

=== Chloe x Halle ===
In 2018, Solberg first performed with Chloe x Halle at the MTV Movie and TV Awards. She has performed with Chloe x Halle since then.

- The Late Late Show with James Corden
- NPR's Tiny Desk
- Spotify's Pre-Grammy Party for Best New Artist Nominees
- Pepsi's Unmute Your Voice Concert
- Verizon Up Concert
- Global Citizen Live

=== Chloe Bailey ===
- The Tonight Show Starring Jimmy Fallon

=== Other Live Appearances ===
- The Kids Are Alright, ABC, on-camera pianist
- The Unicorn, NBC, on-camera pianist

=== Veteran's History Project 20th Anniversary Event Performance ===
On November 7, 2020, Elise Solberg was the pianist in a performance for the Veterans History Project's 20th Anniversary Event celebration at the Library of Congress. Solberg's performance accompanied vocalist Hannah Goldblatt singing Roxanne Seeman and Charles Fox’s song “In Love and War.” It was filmed at Mack Sennett Studios and live-streamed from the Library of Congress. As part of the performance in honor of veterans and their stories, Solberg related Tait Solberg's history with the US Air Force.

On the weekend of Memorial Day 2021, Solberg joined Roxanne Seeman on The Jeremiah Show to talk about the making of their song performance of "In Love And War" for the Veterans History Project.

=== Turn Up Her Mic ===
Solberg founded Turn Up Her Mic as a response to the need for a platform for women in underrepresented roles in the music industry such as musicians, producers, songwriters, music directors, among others. Turn Up Her Mic is a non-profit organization founded in 2020 that organizes virtual panels with open attendance to the music community. It showcases female instrumentalists who discuss the challenges facing them. Panelists included Victoria Theodore (keyboardist for Beyoncé and Stevie Wonder), Karina DePiano (Miley Cyrus, Fifth Harmony, and Troye Sivan) and other women musicians in bands with Ariana Grande, Rihanna, BTS, and John Legend.

Solberg is a member of Alicia Keys’ She Is The Music.

== Recognition ==
John Lennon Songwriting Contest, Finalist 2018
