= Vassar Haiti Project =

Haitian nonprofit organization

The Vassar Haiti Project (VHP), founded in 2001, is a nonprofit organization that promotes Haitian art, fosters sustainable development in Haiti, and mentors student and community volunteers in the principles and practice of global citizenship. Through art auctions and sales, VHP supports the welfare of Haitian artists and artisans. These art sales provide the primary means of funding for initiatives in education, health care, water access and purification, and reforestation in Chermaitre, Haiti, a mountain village in the Nord, Haiti. VHP has a strong educational component, dedicated both to raising awareness of Haitian culture and society in the United States and elsewhere, and to providing a practical education in global citizenship to students, alumnae/i, and friends of Vassar College. The Vassar Haiti Project is incorporated in New York as Haiti Project, Inc., and is a registered U.S. 501(c)(3) nonprofit organization.

== History ==
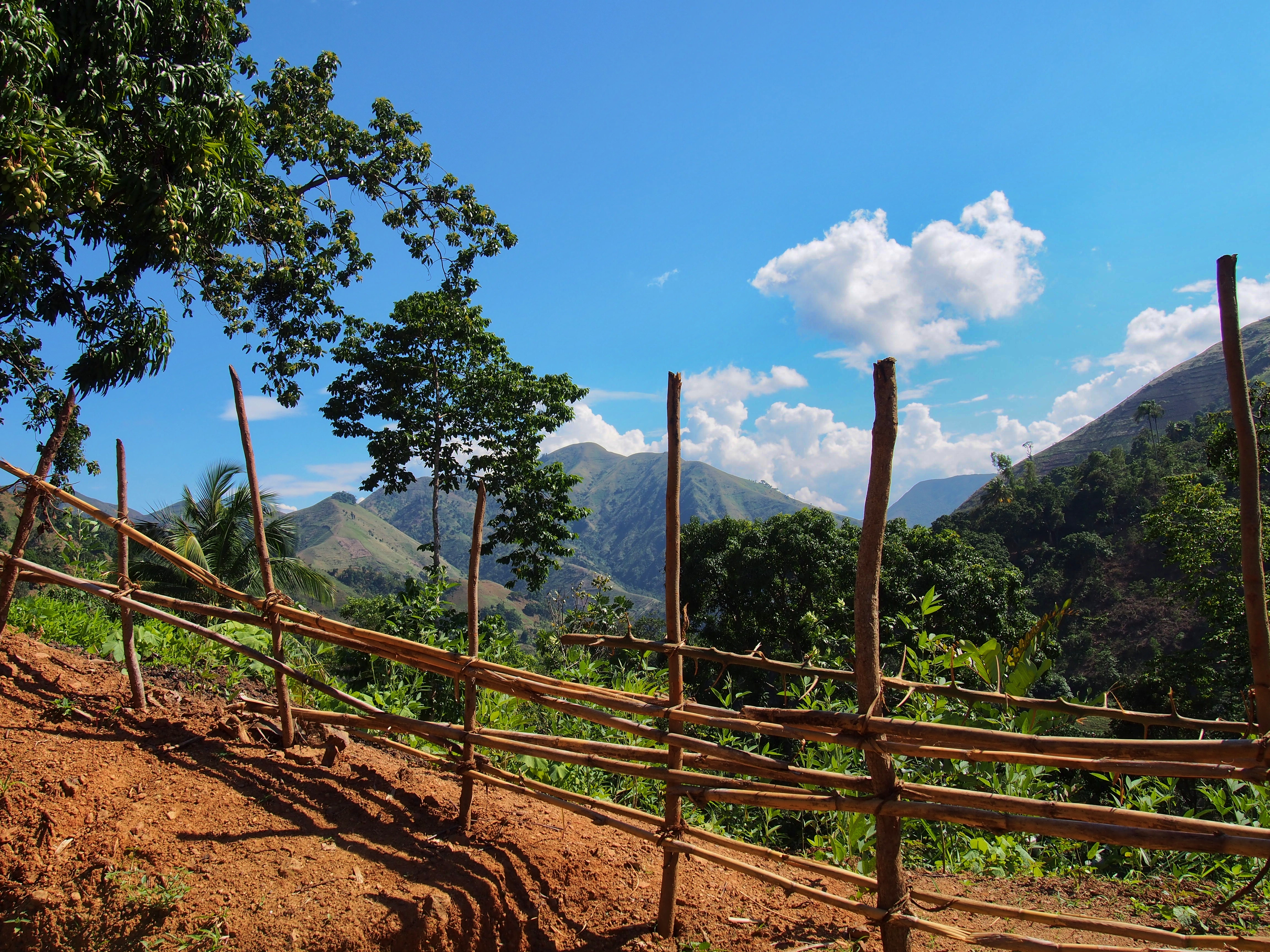
View of mountains near Chermaitre, Haiti

The Vassar Haiti Project was founded in 2001 by Vassar College Director of International Services Dr. Andrew Meade and his wife Lila Metres Meade, and is led largely by Vassar student volunteers. It began as a small project that supported education and lunch programs at a school in Chermaitre, Haiti, before growing in membership and scope to include medical, water, reforestation, and women's initiatives. VHP's first capital initiative was to fund the construction of a seven-room primary school, which was completed in 2008. In early 2011, VHP installed a gravity-driven system of cisterns and PVC piping leading to a faucet by the school. In late 2011, the VHP began construction on a clinic in Fiervil, Haiti, which will provide health care and education to thousands of residents of Chermaitre and several other remote villages.
