= On Two Fronts: Latinos & Vietnam =

(PBS) documentary by producer Mylène Moreno

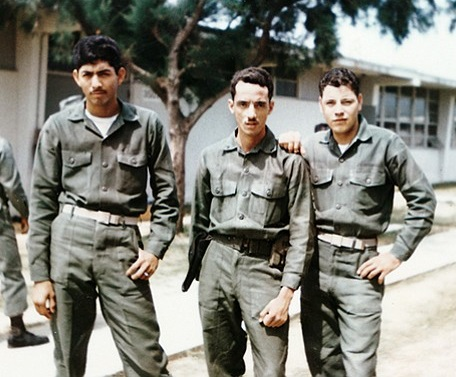
- On Two Fronts: Latinos & Vietnam
- Directed by: Mylène Moreno; Susy Garciasalas Barkley (Assistant)
- Produced by: Mylène Moreno
- Cinematography: Claudio Rocha
- Production companies: Souvenir Pictures, Inc.
- Distributed by: Public Broadcasting Service (PBS)
- Release date: September 22, 2015
- Country: United States
- Language: English

On Two Fronts: Latinos & Vietnam is a Public Broadcasting Service (PBS) documentary by producer Mylène Moreno of Souvenir Pictures, Inc., which takes a comprehensive look at the Latino experience in both the home-front and the battle grounds during the Vietnam War. The documentary, which aired nationwide on PBS on September 22, 2015, is part of PBS Stories of Service.

== The Film ==
The documentary was filmed in two locations, in the southwest of the United States and in Vietnam. It provides home movies, news footage and personal photographs. Plus, included are interviews of veterans, anti-war activists and historians. According to the documentary the vast majority of the Latinos who participated in the conflict were working-class youths, whose heritage of military service is a deep rooted part of their cultural identity in the U.S.

Discussed in the documentary is the fact that during combat in the Vietnam War, the differences between Latino soldiers and Marines and their Anglo-American and African-American counterparts were minimal, however racial tensions and stereotypes still persisted in Vietnam and even more so upon the Latino soldiers who survived the war and returned home.

The documentary tells the story of 9 Marines who came from the small mining town of Morenci, Arizona. They were members of the Morenci High School graduating class of 66 who volunteered and joined the United States Marine Corps after meeting with a USMC recruiter. Nine were killed in the war and thus they became known as the Morenci 9.

Anti-war activism began to spread among the Latino community who argued that Latinos were being exploited and as such included a high rate of combat participation and mortality. The documentary tells the case of Everett and Delia Alvarez, brother and sister who stood on opposite sides of the Vietnam War. Everett Alvarez Jr. was a Navy pilot who was shot down over Vietnam and spent 8 years as a POW. His sister Delia became an antiwar activist and protester. Hispanics began to organize antiwar demonstrations and events to address both the war and the impact it had on their homes and communities.

According to documentary producer Moreno: “With this film, we wanted to look back, five decades later, with the benefit of hindsight, at the Vietnam War — at its costs and consequences — and ask some difficult questions about the price of war and citizenship,”

Among those who were interviewed for the making of the documentary are Everett Alvarez Jr., Delia Alvarez, Oscar Urrea, Tony Santiago, Steve Guzzo, Professor Kyle Longley and Dan Garcia. The documentary aired nationwide on PBS on September 22, 2015.

== Film sections ==
PBS Documentary Producer Mylene Moreno and Cinematographer Claudio Rocha setting up the interview equipment for the documentary.

External videos
- Television interview about the documentary "On Two Fronts: Latinos & Vietnam" in Horizonte external media
- On Two Fronts: Latinos & Vietnam (trailor)

In accordance to the Films Media Group, the documentary is divided into the following sections:

1. Leaving the Folk Movement - Bob Dylan was on the last night of the Newport Folk Festival and with his band opened with "Maggie's Farm." He was booed by those present.
2. Gulf of Tonkin, North Vietnam - President Johnson declared war in August 1964. Everett Alvarez Jr. who endured one of the longest periods as a POW in U.S. military history describes becoming a Navy pilot and his love of flying.
3. Pilots Shot Down - In this section Alex Zermeño, Alvarez's cousin, recalls learning about the downed aircraft. Alvarez Jr. describes his capture; he was the first person in the "Hanoi Hilton." By 1967, over 400,000 American troops were in Vietnam. War affected many families in the barrios of the southwest.
4. Latino Community - Various experts on the subject discuss perceptions about the Latino community and Latino soldiers' involvement in the American military. Alvarez Jr. discusses how the Mexican American community served with pride in his parents' generation.
5. Hero Portfolio - Alvarez Jr. recalls wanting to go to war and receiving a draft notice. Many Latinos joined the military as Marines. Tony Santiago refused to go to college because he wanted to become a Marine and fight for his country.
6. Greenlee County, AZ- Community members of Morenci, Arizona in Greenlee County, discuss the high numbers of Latino servicemen and their sense of duty. Steve Guzzo climbs Mares Bluff and looks across Clifton.
7. Morenci, AZ - Vietnam Veterans from Morenci, Az., reflect on what it was like growing up in a town that was segregated until the early 1970s. Working in the mines and military service were the main employment options for residents. Candy Chavez discusses joining the army. Professor Kyle Longley discusses the fact that of the Morenci 9 who were killed in Vietnam 6 were of the high school class of '66 graduates who had enlisted.
8. Central Coast, CA. - Julian Camacho discusses joining the draft board in 1970 and reviewing deferments.
9. Hanoi, North Vietnam - Alvarez's Jr. sister Delia and his family discusses seeing him on the news footage. Alvarez Jr. recalls being paraded through city streets.
10. Racial Divides - Tony Santiago, of Puerto Rican heritage, recalls learning about racial tensions during his military service.
11. Morenci Deaths - Dan Garcia reflects on the shock of learning one of the Morenci Marines died; Guzzo recalls successive funerals. See a 1968 presidential report, nearly 17,000 American soldiers died in Vietnam during that year.
12. Latino Revolution - The interviewed experts discuss the changing perceptions of draftees after the Tet Offensive and the Latino communities' frustrations with the lack of college recruiters and prevalence of military recruiters. Gregg Barrios discusses a student walkout in Crystal City, Texas.
13. Last of the Morenci 9 to Die in Vietnam - A 1969 television report shows the grave of Clive Garcia; his brother discusses his death and funeral. Friends and family recall Clive's military outlook.
14. Latinos in Protest - Experts discuss Latin American mothers' changing perceptions of their sons' participation in the Vietnam War. Footage of a 1970 protest in Los Angeles, CA and Delia Alvarez expressing her family's sentiment is presented within the documentary.
15. Ending the Vietnam War? - President Nixon's January 1972 and January 1973 addresses to the nation about the Vietnam War and POWs. Alvarez Jr. and other POWs return home in February 1973. The documentary includes a press footage of Alvarez Jr. discussing anti-war activities.
16. POWs Return - Alvarez Jr. considers the effects of North Vietnamese propaganda and his surprise upon returning home; Delia Alvarez reflects on her family's elation.
17. Life After War - Vietnam veterans discuss the difficulty of seeing fellow servicemen die and adjusting to life after their return home.
18. Honoring War Veterans - Over 1,800 dog tags hang on the Mares Bluff Veterans Memorial. Experts discuss questioning the Vietnam War and Latino military service. Camacho shares his belief about Latino service enlistment.
19. Mares Bluff Veterans Memorial - Guzzo and Urrea honor their comrades at the memorial; 13 men from Greenlee County died in the Vietnam War. Garcia recalls his brother escorting the body Robert Moncayo home.
