= Association of Naval Services Officers =

Organization

- Formation: February 12, 1981
- Founder: Edward Hidalgo
- Purpose: The Premier Hispanic Organization of the Sea Services
- Website: www.ansomil.org

The Association of Naval Services Officers (ANSO) is an organization dedicated to expanding the presence of Hispanic and Latino Americans in the Sea Services of the United States Navy, the United States Marine Corps, the United States Coast Guard, and the United States Merchant Marine. The organization was established in 1981. ANSO connects and networks Hispanics in the Coast Guard, Marine Corps, and Navy together and supports recruitment and retention of officers in the Sea Services. Programs include mentoring, training, and education.

ANSO works particularly closely with the Navy to support the diversity goals of the Chief of Naval Operations of increasing the number of Hispanic active duty officers from 6 to 13 percent by 2037.

== History ==
Recruiting Hispanics and preparing them for careers in the Navy was a special project of United States Secretary of the Navy Edward Hidalgo during the Carter administration from 1979-1981. Hidalgo began addressing recruitment options at the Hispanic Officer Recruitment Conference (HORC) in December 1980. As a result of this meeting, the Association of Naval Service Officers (ANSO) was created. ANSO was formally established in February 1981.

In the 1990s, ANSO National President CDR Raúl Castañeda, USN (1993-1996) expanded the mission of the organization from one of recruitment of Hispanics to one that also included training and networking. Castañeda also helped increase the number of members, doubling it in size.

== Chapters ==
ANSO has chapters in various states which directly assist the Sea Services efforts in attracting Hispanics as naval officers, as well as retaining Hispanic officers through recruitment, mentoring and educational efforts. ANSO conducts an east and west regional professional development symposium each year which attracts high-level military leaders who assist in furthering the organization's goals.

== ANSO Board of Directors ==
The board currently consists of 21 members (2012-2013).

- National President: CAPT Roy Love, USN (Ret.)
- National Executive Vice-President: LCDR Rolando Jesus Machado Jr., USN
- National Treasurer: LCDR Edwin Ortiz, USCG
- National Secretary: GySgt Dilia Introini, USMC Veteran
- National Judge Advocate: CDR Sergio Villaverde, USCGR (Ret.)
- Navy Service Representative: Vacant
- Marine Corps Service Representative: LtCol. Jose Montalvan, USMC
- Coast Guard Representative: LCDR Eric Driggs, USCGR

== ANSO Board of Advisors ==
- Ray Mellado, CEO Great Minds in Stem, ANSO BoA Chairman
