= Veterans History Project =

The Veterans History Project American Folklife Center
- Location: Washington, D.C., United States
- Scope: To collect and preserve firsthand remembrances of U.S. wartime veterans
- Established: 2000

Collection
- Items collected: recorded interviews, original letters, diaries, photos, memoirs and historic documents related to a veteran's wartime service
- Size: over 65,000 collections

Other information
- Parent organization: Library of Congress
- Website: www.loc.gov/vets/

The Veterans History Project of the Library of Congress American Folklife Center (commonly known as the Veterans History Project) was created by the United States Congress in 2000 to collect and preserve the firsthand remembrances of U.S. wartime veterans. Its mandate ensures future generations may hear directly from those who served to better understand the realities of war. It is a special project of the American Folklife Center, a research center of the Library of Congress.

The program is conducted through Congressional offices and relies on a national network of veteran service organizations, universities, secondary schools, community groups and the general public to record interviews according to program guidelines. These and original letters, diaries, photos, memoirs and historic documents related to a veteran's wartime service are then preserved at the Library of Congress. Through 2010 the project held more than 65,000 collections and was considered the largest oral history program of its kind in the nation. It serves as an important resource for scholars, historians, students and the general public.

The Veterans History Project authorizing legislation (Public Law 106-380) was sponsored by Representatives Ron Kind, Amo Houghton, and Steny Hoyer in the U.S. House of Representatives and Senators Max Cleland and Chuck Hagel in the U.S. Senate. It received unanimous support and was signed into law by President Bill Clinton on October 27, 2000.

== Directors ==
- 2000–2006: Ellen McCulloch Lovell
- 2006–2016: Robert Patrick
- 2016–: Karen Lloyd

== Associated media projects ==
Notable media projects associated with the Veterans History Project include:

- A March 2007 screening of a series of films, shorts, and television episodes during Women's History Month titled "Women at War" highlighting American servicewomen participation in the major wars of the 20th century.
  - March 2: Mad Parade (1931) and 100% American (1918)
  - March 9: Ladies Courageous (1944) and Women in Defense (1942)
  - March 16: Flight Nurse (1953) and M*A*S*H episode season 7, episode 16: "Inga" (1979)
  - March 23: An episode from the acclaimed TV series China Beach and a television report titled "Woman Doctor in Vietnam" (1966), which aired on the CBS news program The 20th Century
  - March 30: Courage Under Fire (1996)
- A joint community engagement during 2007 between the Veterans History Project and PBS resulted in the September 7 airing of the seven-part Ken Burns PBS documentary The War. The television miniseries underscores the VHP's objective of building the historic record by collecting first-hand recollections of wartime veterans. It also profiles civilians who work in support of war efforts, such as Rosie the Riveters and USO volunteers.
- The VHP launched a companion website on October 1, 2007, to "guide viewers through each episode, detail related historic events through the perspectives of hundreds of World War II veterans who contributed their recollections to the project archives, and showcase the wide variety of media contributed to the archives.
- The VHP commemorated Veterans Day on November 11, 2008, with a special online presentation featuring firsthand recollections of African American soldiers from the 92nd Infantry Division of World War II.
- The Veterans History Project commemorated its 10th anniversary through a host of various events and initiatives, including a commemorative anniversary event. The featured speaker for this event was James H. Billington, the 13th Librarian of Congress, who called upon Americans to collect the stories of veterans on September 29th, 2010.
- The VHP commemorated its 15th anniversary with a new web presentation titled "VHP at 15: Collections Over the Years," to memorialize fifteen collections through their existing online series, "Experiencing War."
- The Veterans History Project celebrated its 20th anniversary with online concerts and panels, November 6–14, 2020
  - November 6: Barbara Martin
  - November 7: "In Love and War" - Roxanne Seeman, songwriter with Elise Solberg, pianist and Hannah Goldblatt, singer
  - November 8: "Still Over There" - Franklin Tootle, Operation Song
  - November 9: Conversation on conversing: Veterans discuss VHP participation
  - November 10: "Old Glory" - Kimberley Mitchell, Operation Song
  - November 12: Organizational benefits to collaborating with VHP, panel discussion
  - November 13: "Precious Pearl" - Kimberley Mitchell, Operation Song
  - November 14: Volunteering to make history, panel discussion
