= Foreign enlistment in the American Civil War =

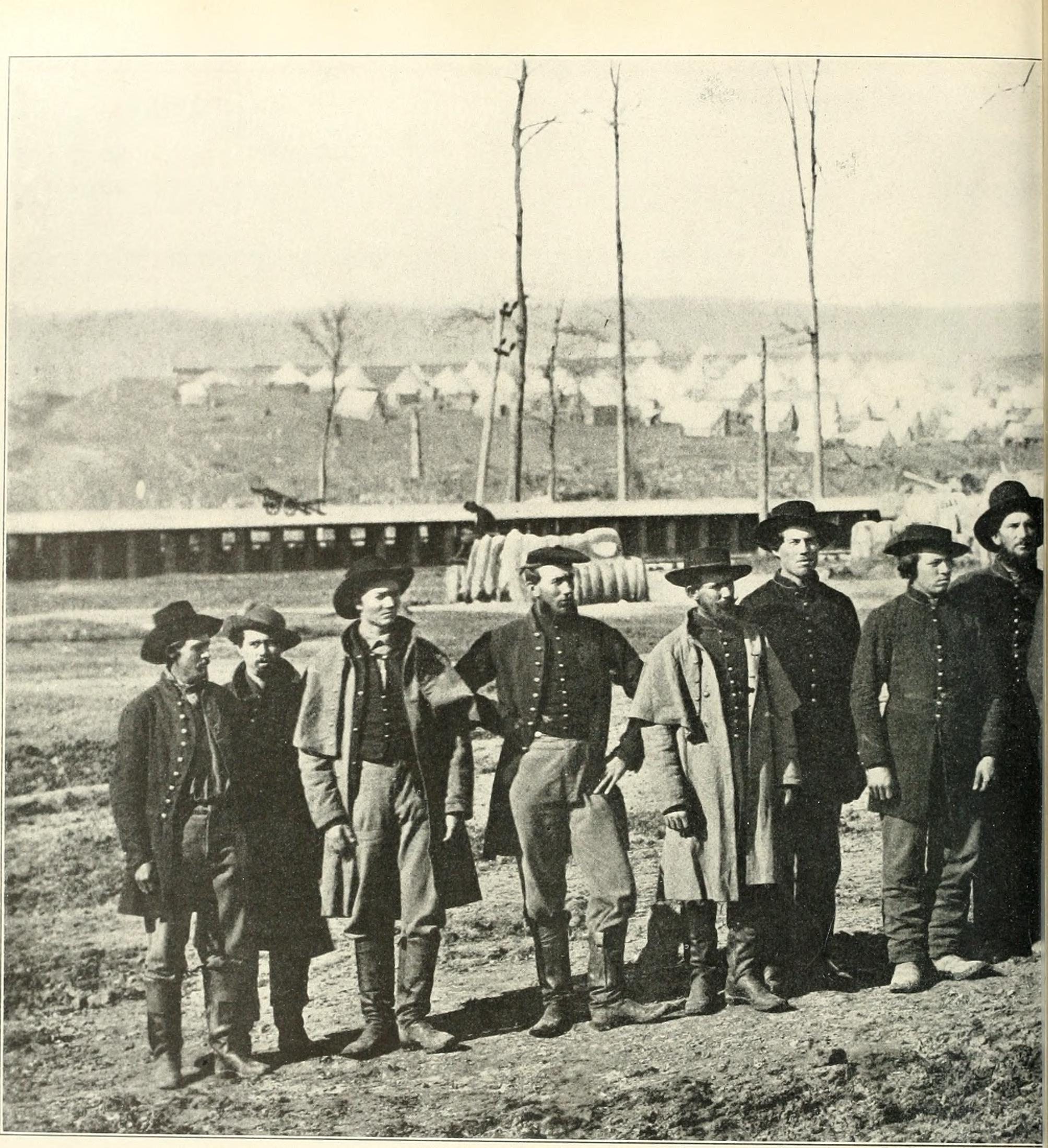
Scottish, Swedish, German, Irish, and French soldiers of the Union Army at Corinth, Mississippi.

Foreign enlistment in the American Civil War (1861–1865) reflected the conflict's international significance among both governments and their citizenry. Diplomatic and popular interest were aroused by the United States' status as a nascent power and by the war's central cause being the globally divisive issue of slavery. Consequently, many men enlisted from abroad and among immigrant communities in the U.S.

When hostilities first broke out, roughly 13% of Americans were foreign-born, the vast majority concentrated in northern cities; subsequently, foreign enlistment largely favored the Union, which was also far more successful at attracting volunteers. Roughly a quarter to a third of the Union Army was foreign-born. Immigrants were not as present in the Confederate Army, but tens of thousands of foreigners also served with the Confederacy. Some historians claim the North would not have prevailed without immigrant soldiers.

Reflecting the influx of immigrants leading up to the war, the largest foreign contingents on either side were German, Irish, and British (including English, Scottish and Welsh). The Welsh, who generally held strong abolitionist beliefs, overwhelmingly joined the Union Army, with over 6,000 men volunteering. Most other foreign recruits were from Canada and the rest of Europe, particularly Poland, France, Italy, and Scandinavia; smaller numbers came from China, Mexico, Hawaii, and various Native American tribes. Several high-ranking political and military leaders in both the Union and Confederacy were of foreign or immigrant background.

Like American citizens, foreigners and immigrants fought in the war for various reasons; many were motivated by an ideological opposition to slavery, others by loyalty to their adopted homeland, and still others sought economic opportunity. Regardless of their motives and origins, most foreign soldiers reportedly served with as much loyalty and distinction as native-born Americans. Nevertheless, many were subject to the wider nativist sentiments of American society, as well as to prejudices against their particular ethnicity, faith, or nationality. Some in the Union downplayed immigrant contributions, partly in response to Confederate propaganda directed at both Northern and foreign audiences that claimed the Union was relying heavily on "foreign mercenaries" and "refuse" to serve as cannon fodder.

== Background ==
In the 40 years leading to the outbreak of the war, the United States had received four million immigrants; the vast majority came from Ireland (one million), the German states (500,000), and Great Britain (300,000). By 1860, well over a tenth of all Americans were foreign-born, with a similar proportion being second- or third-generation immigrants. The influx drove a significant demographic shift in the country: At the start of the 19th century, the U.S. population was around five million; by 1860, it had swelled to roughly 31 million.

The more urbanized and industrialized states of the northern U.S. drew the lion's share of foreign arrivals, which accounted for the Union's decisive demographic advantage over the Confederacy; two-thirds of all Americans (21 million) lived in U.S.-controlled territory. This included 91% of all pre-war immigrants, who now made up over half the U.S. population following secession. Consequently, the North recruited the overwhelming majority of foreigners who served in the Civil War.

While most immigrants, particularly from Ireland, were fleeing hardship, famine, and persecution, a large number, especially from German lands, came following the sociopolitical upheavals that gripped much of Europe in 1848. Many new arrivals had republican sentiments and a strong opposition to political oppression of all forms, including slavery; parallels were drawn between the enslavement of African Americans and the aristocratic exploitation of serfs and peasants. Hence many U.S. immigrants were enthusiastic supporters of the Union and joined for ideological reasons.

== Union enlistment ==
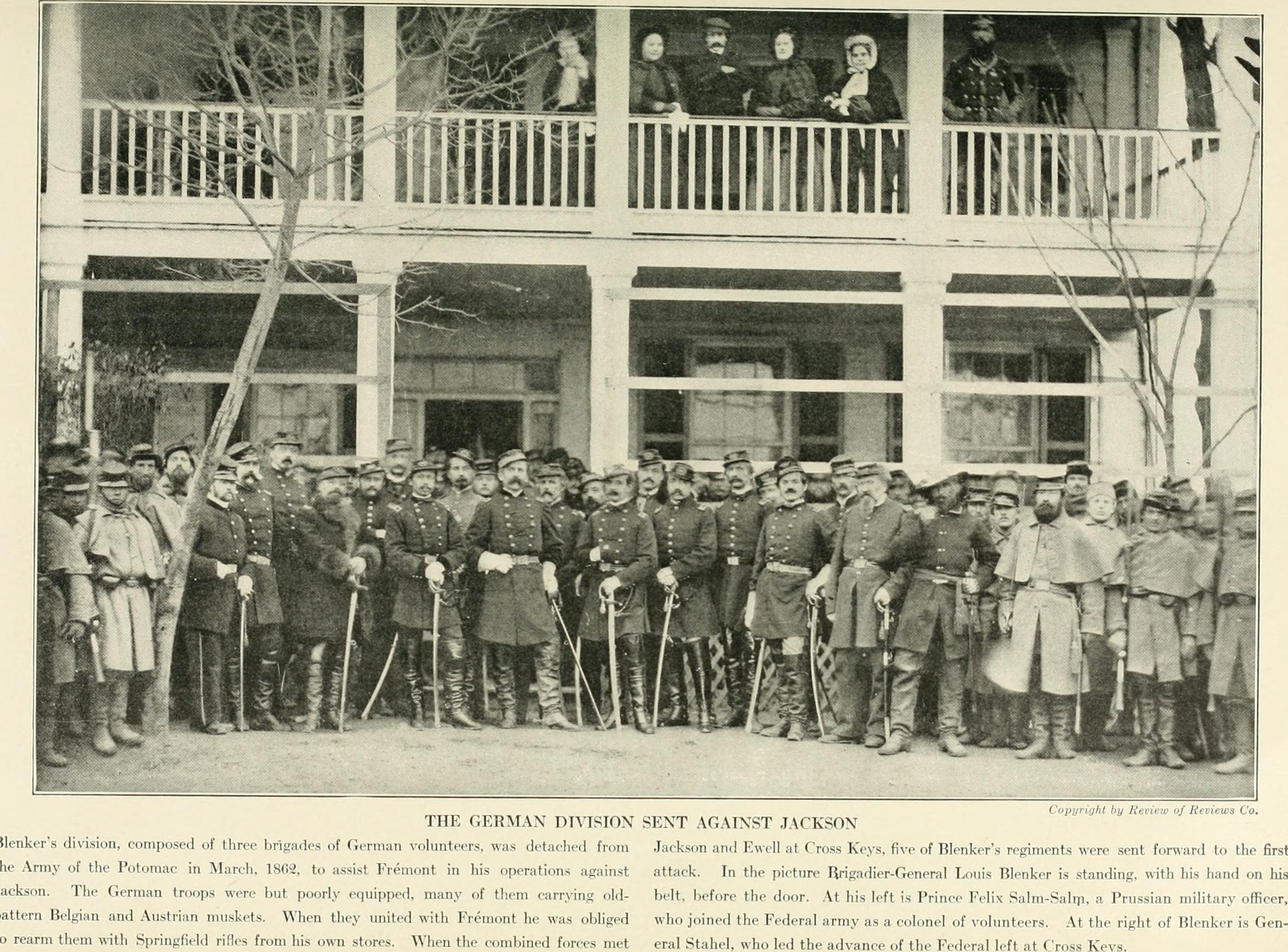
German Division of the Army of the Potomac sent against Gen. Jackson, led by Hungarian Maj.-Gen. Julius Stahel; German Brig.-Gen. Louis Blenker and Col. Felix Salm-Salm, a Prussian prince.

The Union made a concerted effort to recruit foreigners both at home and abroad. One recruitment poster, written in Italian, French, Hungarian, and German, called on "250 able-bodied men . . . Patriots of all nations" to serve their "adopted country". U.S. diplomats, who sought to garner international support while undermining recognition and aid to the Confederacy, reported enthusiasm for the Union cause among many foreigners; in the summer of 1861, just months after the war began, a U.S. mission in Italy received hundreds of Italian volunteers, some wearing the patriotic red shirts of the Italian unification movement.

Foreign recruits were generally well-integrated with their American-born counterparts, serving in volunteer regiments that were raised from particular states and cities rather than nationalities. This was especially true of Canadian and British soldiers, who were more geographically dispersed than other ethnic groups, and far less distinguishable from native-born Americans in language and culture. U.S. President Abraham Lincoln was attentive to the diversity and foreign makeup of the military and made conscious efforts to foster inclusivity of ethnic and national minorities, namely through high-level appointments and promotions.

Of those contingents drawn specifically from particular immigrant communities, the largest and most notable comprised Irish and German Americans, who together comprised half of all foreign soldiers.

Germans were by far the largest foreign ethnic group to fight for the Union: Approximately 216,000 Union soldiers were either born in Germany, or were second or third generation Germans, drawn largely from New York, Wisconsin, and Ohio. Major recruiting efforts were aimed specifically at German communities across the country, particularly in Cincinnati, St. Louis, and Milwaukee. President Lincoln appointed Franz Sigel, a German veteran of the 1848 revolutions, to the influential rank of major general partly to drive political support among German Americans; Sigel would be the highest ranking German American officer in the Union Army.

It isn’t a war where two powers fight to win a piece of land. Instead it’s about freedom or slavery, and you can well imagine, dear mother, I support the cause of freedom with all my might. — German enlistee, in a private letter to his family.

Several regiments were composed entirely of Germans, including the 52nd New York, 9th Ohio, 74th Pennsylvania, 32nd Indiana (1st German), and the 9th Wisconsin. German units had a reputation for discipline and martial prowess; many Germans had previously served in European armies or participated in the armed uprisings of 1848. Aside from Maj. Gen. Sigel, other so-called "Forty Eighters" who served in high-ranking positions were Maj. Gen. Carl Schurz, Brig. Gen. August Willich, Louis Blenker, Max Weber and Alexander Schimmelfennig. In its two years of operation, all but one commander of the XI Corps, which played a decisive role in the battles of Chancellorsville and Gettysburg, were Germans, including Sigel and Schurz. Numerous German Americans received the Medal of Honor, the highest award for military valor in the United States.

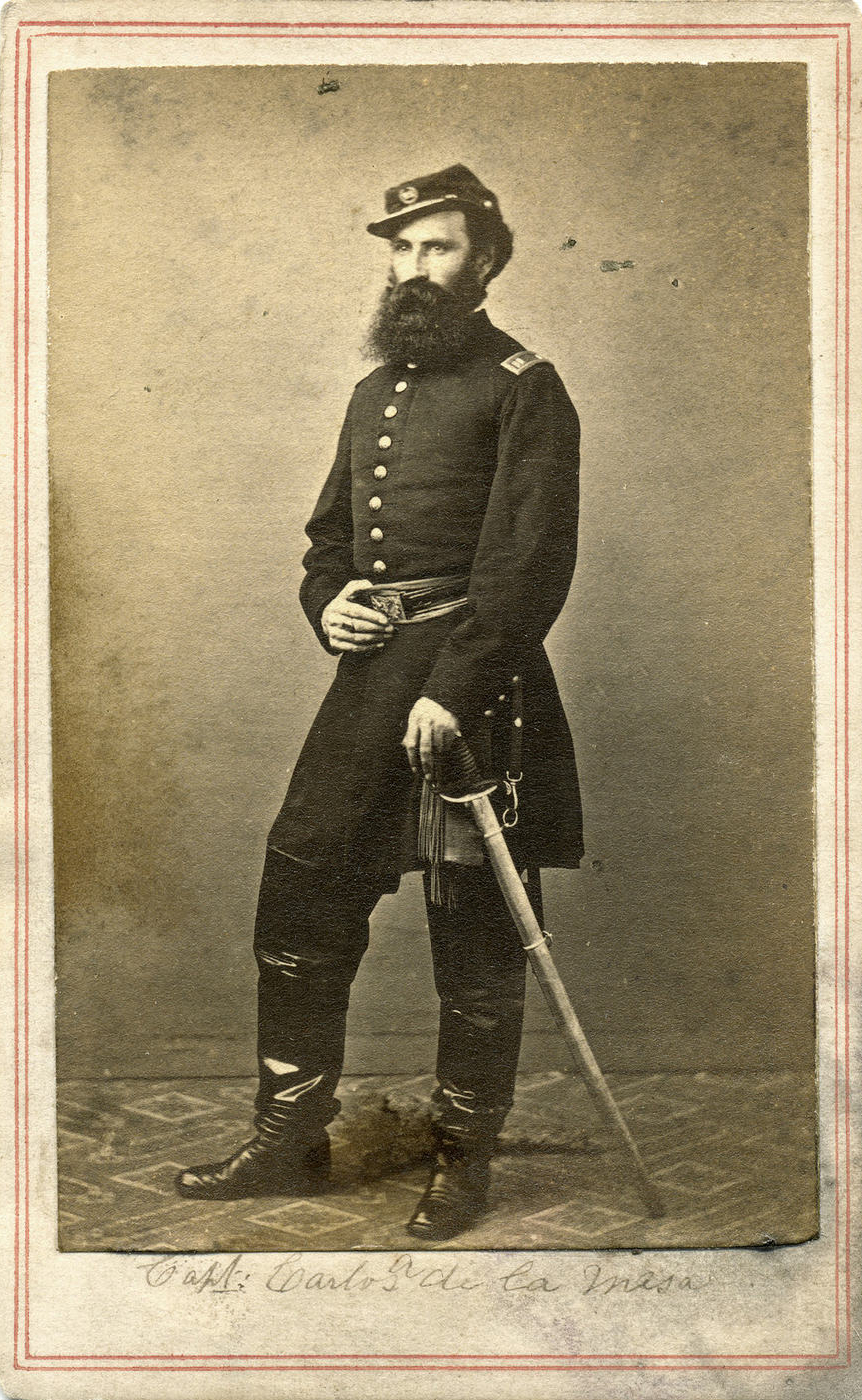
Captain Carlos Alvarez de la Mesa, a Spaniard who served in the multiethnic 39th New York Infantry Regiment, widely known as the "Garibaldi Guard"

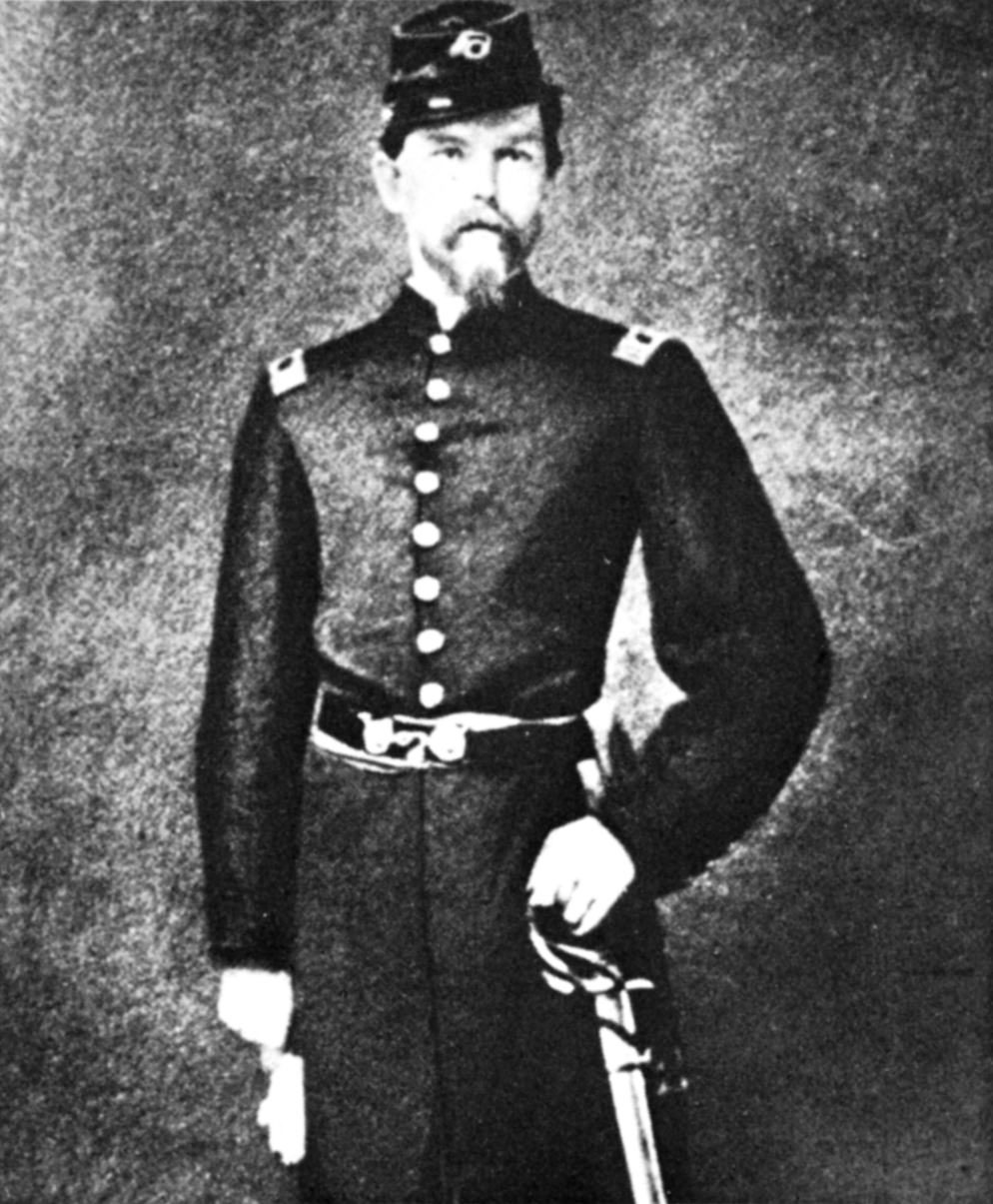
Emil Frey, who was later President of the Swiss Confederation, served as colonel of the 82nd Illinois Infantry Regiment and was taken prisoner at the Battle of Gettysburg

Irish Americans were best known for their distinguished service in the Irish Brigade, comprising the well-regarded "Fighting 69th" New York Infantry Regiment, the 63rd and 88th New York Infantry, the 28th Massachusetts and later the 116th Pennsylvania. The Brigade took part in almost every major battle and campaign in the Eastern Theater and was renowned for its bravery and valor; it reportedly suffered some of the highest casualties of any Union formation. Irish were also drawn from the British Empire, and after the war several veterans took part in the Fenian raids against British targets in Canada.

One of the first military companies raised when the war broke out comprised entirely Polish immigrants recruited by Brig. Gen. Włodzimierz Krzyżanowski, a veteran of the Greater Poland uprising of 1848. It was moved to New York City and joined with several other mostly-immigrant companies to form the 58th New York Infantry Regiment, officially registered as the Polish Legion. Krzyżanowski was later a brigade commander of the XI Corps at Gettysburg, and after the war was appointed governor of Georgia.

Other nationalities were represented in their own regiments. Among the most visible was the 79th New York Highlanders, formed in 1859, which initially consisted entirely of Scottish immigrants or descendants. Soldiers sported kilts and bonnets and were accompanied by bagpipes; on at least one occasion, the First Battle of Bull Run, they wore tartan trews of Clan Cameron in honor of their colonel. During the course of the war, the 79th opened its ranks to Irish, English and other immigrants, most of whom had been living in the U.S. for years.

The multiethnic makeup of Union forces sometimes posed communications problems due to language barriers, as many regiments and divisions included a mix of volunteers from Germany, Ireland, Italy, Poland, and other European countries. A notable example was the 39th New York Infantry Regiment—also known as the "Garibaldi Guard" after Italian revolutionary Giuseppe Garibaldi—which was led by Hungarian colonel Frederick George D'Utassy and comprised over a dozen nationalities, including Algerians, Turks, Slavs, Swiss, and Spaniards. Maj. Gen. Sigel had his orders translated from his native German to Hungarian for his officers, whose reports in turn were translated in English for the rest of his command, then finally in German for his review.

Many Hungarian volunteers, like their counterparts from the rest of continental Europe, were veterans of the 1848 uprisings, namely the Hungarian uprising against Austrian rule. In the earliest months of the war, before the development and adoption of formal encryption methods, Hungarian speakers served as code talkers, encoding and decoding telegrams and written correspondences with sensitive tactical information.

Several volunteers came from the British colony of Bermuda, especially from among the coloured population, a term used on the island to designate anyone not entirely of European heritage. Most served in dedicated "colored" regiments made up of African Americans, such as the 31st, the 26th, and the 6th Coloured Infantry. Among the most notable Bermudian volunteers was First Sergeant Robert John Simmons of the 54th Massachusetts Infantry Regiment, who had previously served in the British Army; he died in the Second Battle of Fort Wagner, the most famous action of the 54th Regiment, which took place outside the Bermudian settlement of Charleston, South Carolina—ironically a major destination of contraband from his native island.

Many Jewish recruits, who formed the largest religious minority in the Union, were first- or second-generation immigrants; the majority of foreign-born Jews came from German lands. They often faced greater hardship than other foreign groups due to both general antisemitism and ignorance to their distinct religious customs; for example, pork was often served to all troops without regard to Jewish dietary restrictions. The most infamous example of anti-Jewish prejudice was General Order No. 11, issued by Union Major-General Ulysses S. Grant on December 17, 1862, which expelled all Jews from Grant's military district in an effort to reduce corruption and illicit commercial activity presumably undertaken "mostly by Jews and other unprincipled traders."

Notwithstanding incidents of both latent and overt discrimination, Jews as a whole, like other minority groups in the Union, demonstrated high morale and loyalty; among the most notable examples were Leopold Karpeles and Abraham Cohn, immigrants from Bohemia and Prussia, respectively, who were awarded the Medal of Honor. President Lincoln likewise made a concerted effort to ensure Jews were appointed to leadership positions and accommodated by the military, such as in chaplaincies; he also countermanded Grant's controversial order almost immediately after learning about it.

== Confederate enlistment ==
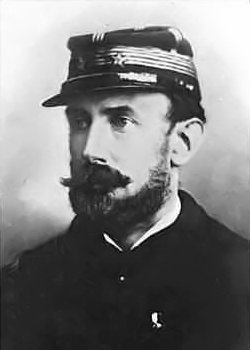
Born to French nobility, Prince Camille Armand Jules Marie de Polignac served the Confederacy with distinction, rising from lieutenant colonel to major general during the course of the war.

Tens of thousands of pre-war immigrants served in the Confederate Army, which had formations composed of Irish, Italian, Polish, German, and Mexican troops. While neither as large nor as strategically decisive as the Union's foreign-born recruits, the Confederacy's foreign contingents were similarly known for their valor and loyalty. Approximately forty thousand Irish and ten thousand English born immigrants joined the ranks of the Confederacy.

Most foreign-born Confederate soldiers had spent the majority of their lives in the American South and were comparatively better integrated than their Northern counterparts. Many fought out of personal affinity to their local or state community, rather than in support of slavery or secession; others were compelled by social pressure engendered by the South's greater need for manpower. By 1863, some Confederate leaders, such as Georgia Governor Joseph E. Brown, forcibly recruited foreign nationals to shore up the war effort.

Irish Americans were comparatively better represented than other nationalities in the Confederate military, since most of them were supporters of the pro-Confederacy Democratic Party. The most notable volunteer division in the Confederate army comprised descendants of various European communities living in Louisiana, with the division being commanded by Major-General Camille Armand Jules Marie, Prince de Polignac, a French veteran of the Crimean War. Known affectionately by his troops as "Prince Polecat", Polignac served with distinction in the Red River Campaign, most notably in the Confederate victory at the Battle of Mansfield.

Britain, which was strongly abolitionist both politically and socioculturally, nevertheless had some sympathy for the Confederacy, largely from those with economic ties to the South (either through selling supplies to the Confederates or dealing in Southern cotton) or who admired its vaguely aristocratic political hierarchy. Confederate efforts to garner British diplomatic recognition and support culminated in the Trent Affair, which nearly brought Britain to a state of war with the United States. Numerous British Americans in the South enlisted in the Confederate military, with similar motives to other European immigrants. Among the most notable British subjects to join the Confederacy included Henry Wemyss Feilden, who resigned his commission in the Black Watch to become an officer in the Army of Tennessee, and William Watson, who served as a sergeant in the 3rd Louisiana Infantry before commanding blockade runners.

The Confederacy also enjoyed strong support from Bermuda, which had maintained commercial ties with the South since the early 17th century. St. George's, Bermuda was the primary harbor from which European-produced goods were smuggled into the South aboard blockade runners; cotton travelled in the reverse direction as payment. Many Bermudians earned fortunes through trading with the Confederacy, most notably the blockade runner Thomas Leslie Outerbridge. Confederate agents operated openly in Bermuda, while the United States consul there had his mail stolen on two occasions and the consulate's flagpole was cut down on the 4th of July.

== See also ==
- Diplomacy of the American Civil War
- United Kingdom in the American Civil War
- Canada in the American Civil War
- Irish military diaspora
- Military history of Jewish Americans § Civil War
- Military history of Asian Americans § American Civil War
- African Americans in the American Civil War
- German Americans in the American Civil War
- Hispanics in the American Civil War
- Irish Americans in the American Civil War
- Italian Americans in the Civil War
- Native Americans in the American Civil War
