= 39th New York Infantry Regiment =

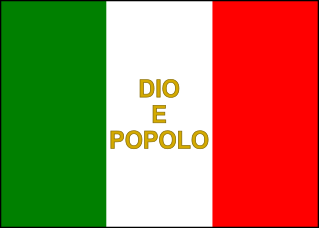
- Non-regulation regimental flag of the 39th New York Infantry Regiment
- Active: May 22, 1861 – July 1, 1865
- Disbanded: July 1, 1865
- Country: United States
- Allegiance: Union
- Branch: Infantry
- Size: 969, (Note: As reported back to Adjutant General Hillhouse upon departure from New York on June 27, 1861) 810 (Note: As reported back to Adjutant General Hillhouse, on December 31, 1861), 772 (Note: As reported back to Adjutant General Sprague, on December 31, 1861)
- Nickname: Garibaldi Guard
- Patron: Giuseppe Garibaldi
- Mottos: Dio e Popolo (English: God and People)
- Equipment: Model 1842 Springfield Muskets (.69 caliber, rifled), model 1855, 1861, , Enfield Rifled Muskets, Austrian Rifled Muskets
- Engagements: American Civil War: First Battle of Bull Run; Battle of Gettysburg; Battle of Bristoe Station; Battle of the Wilderness; Siege of Petersburg; First Battle of Deep Bottom

Commanders
- Current commander: Frederick George D'Utassy
- Ceremonial chief: Daniel Woodall
- Colonel of the Regiment: Augustus Funk

Insignia
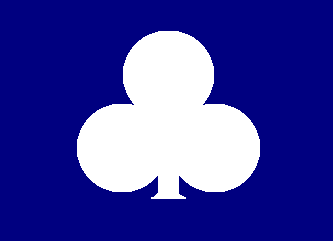
- II Corps (2nd Division) badge

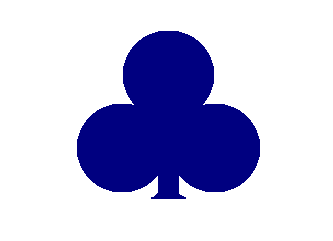
- II Corps (3rd Division) badge

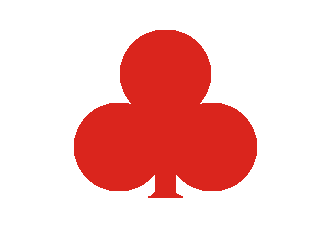
- II Corps (1st Division) badge

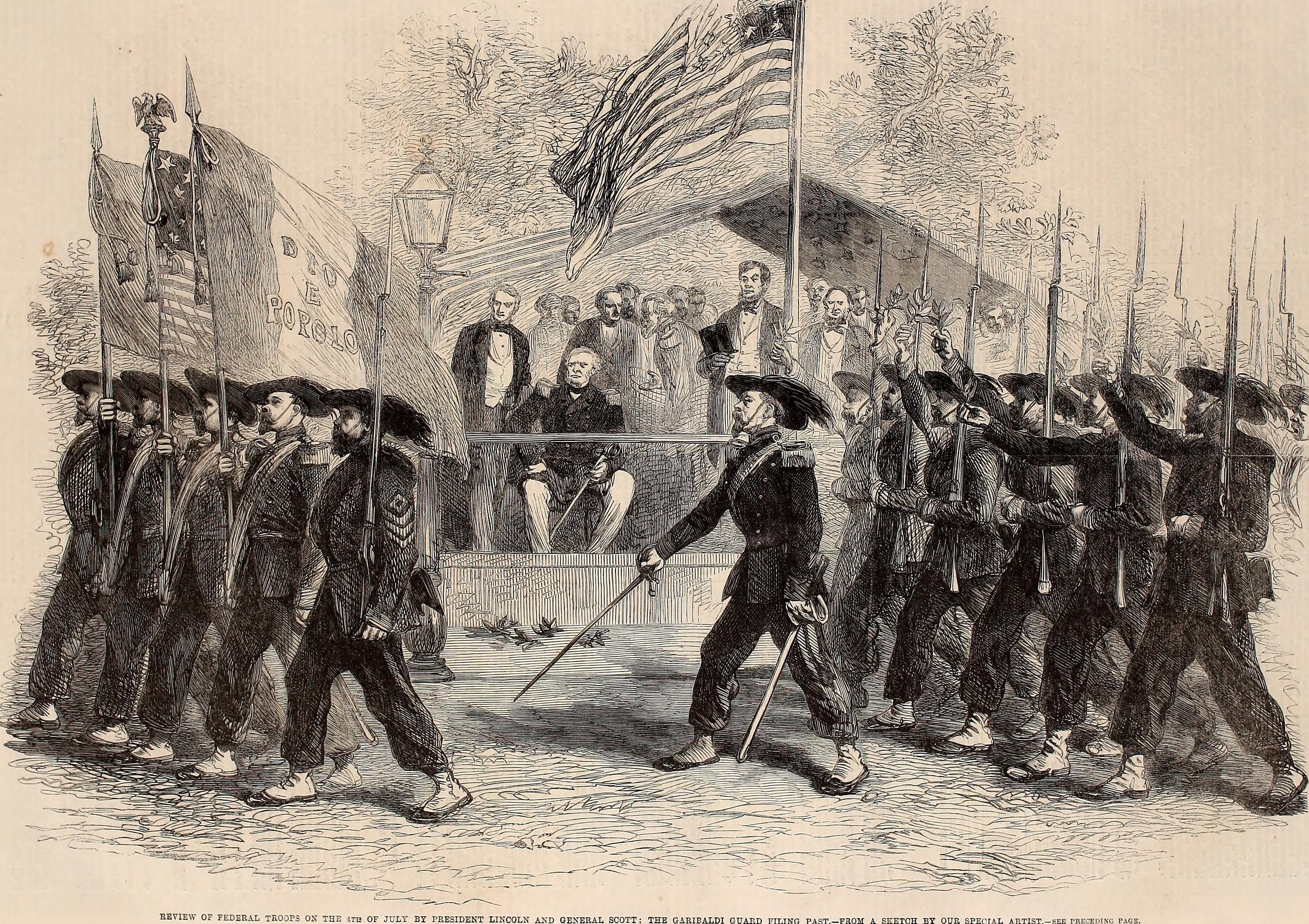
March past of the 'Garibaldi Guard' before President Lincoln and General Scott, 4 July 1861

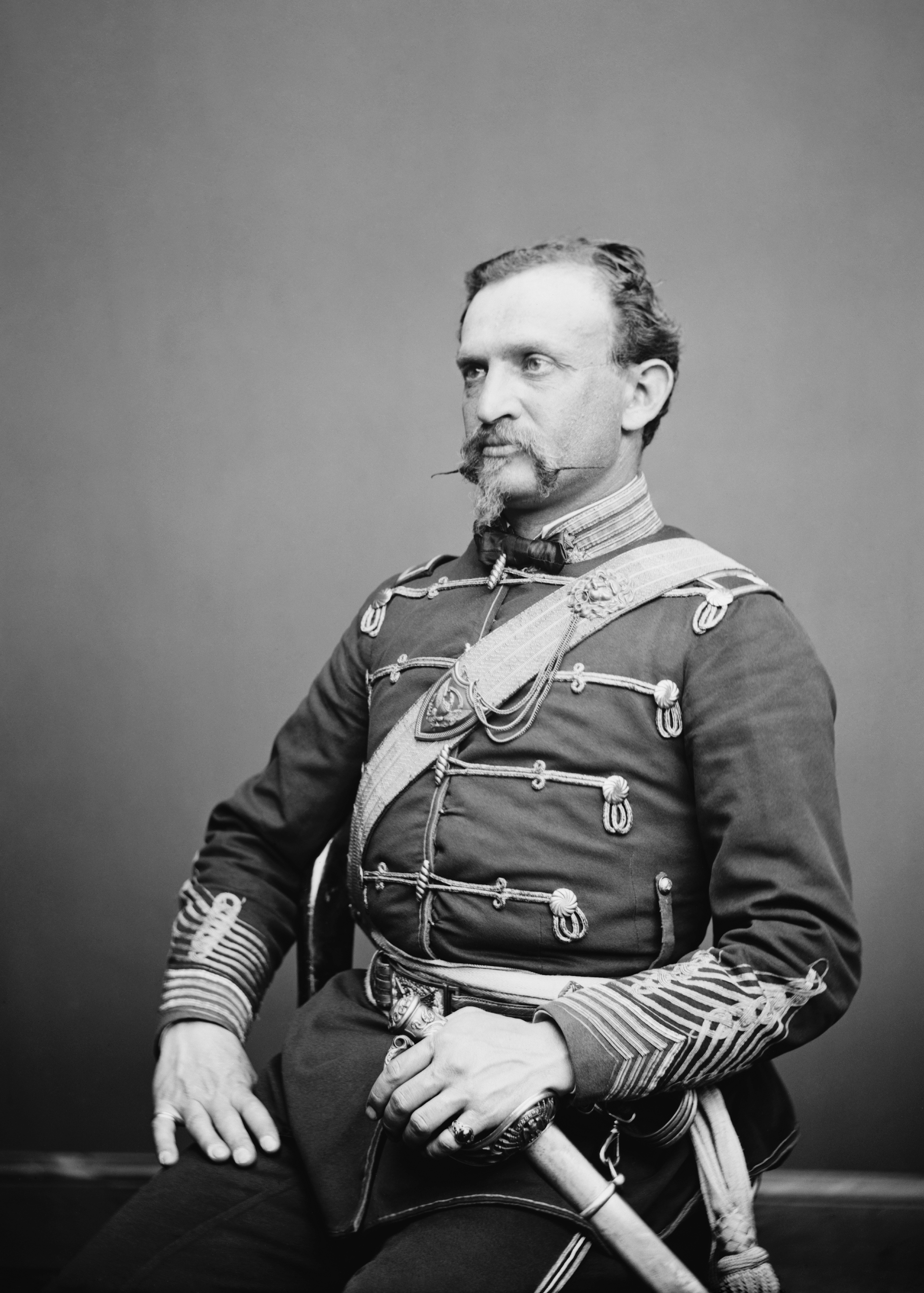
Col. Frederick George D'Utassy

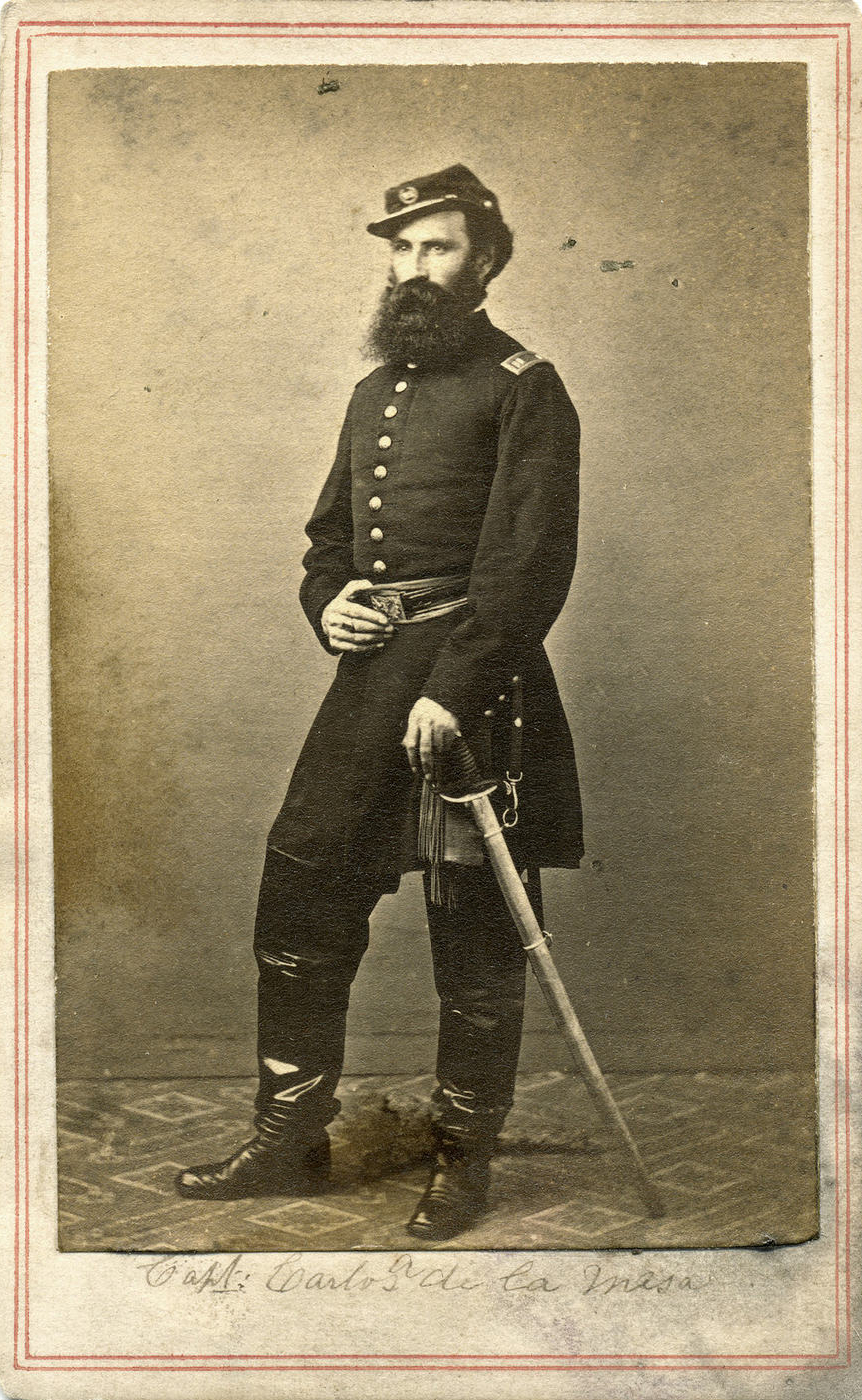
Captain Carlos Alvarez de la Mesa Company D 39th NY

The 39th New York Infantry Regiment, known as the "Garibaldi Guard" after the Italian revolutionary, Giuseppe Garibaldi, was an infantry regiment that served in the Union Army during the American Civil War.

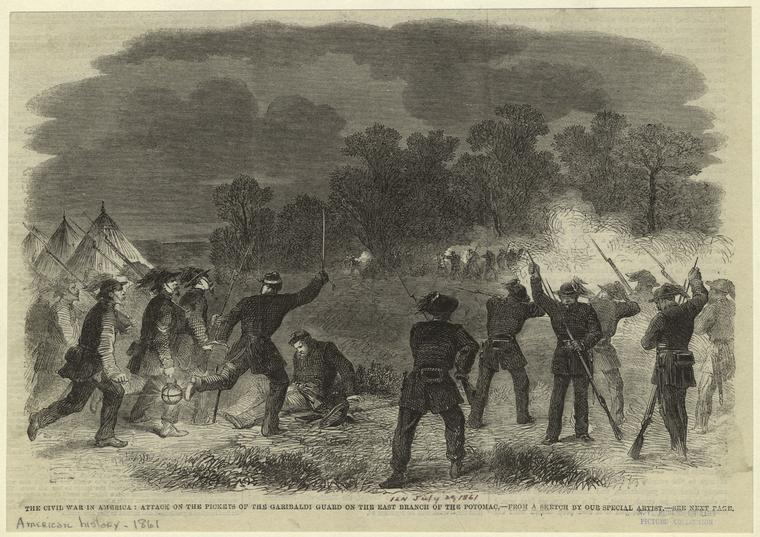
Illustrated London News: attack on Garibaldi Guard pickets on the east branch of the Potomac

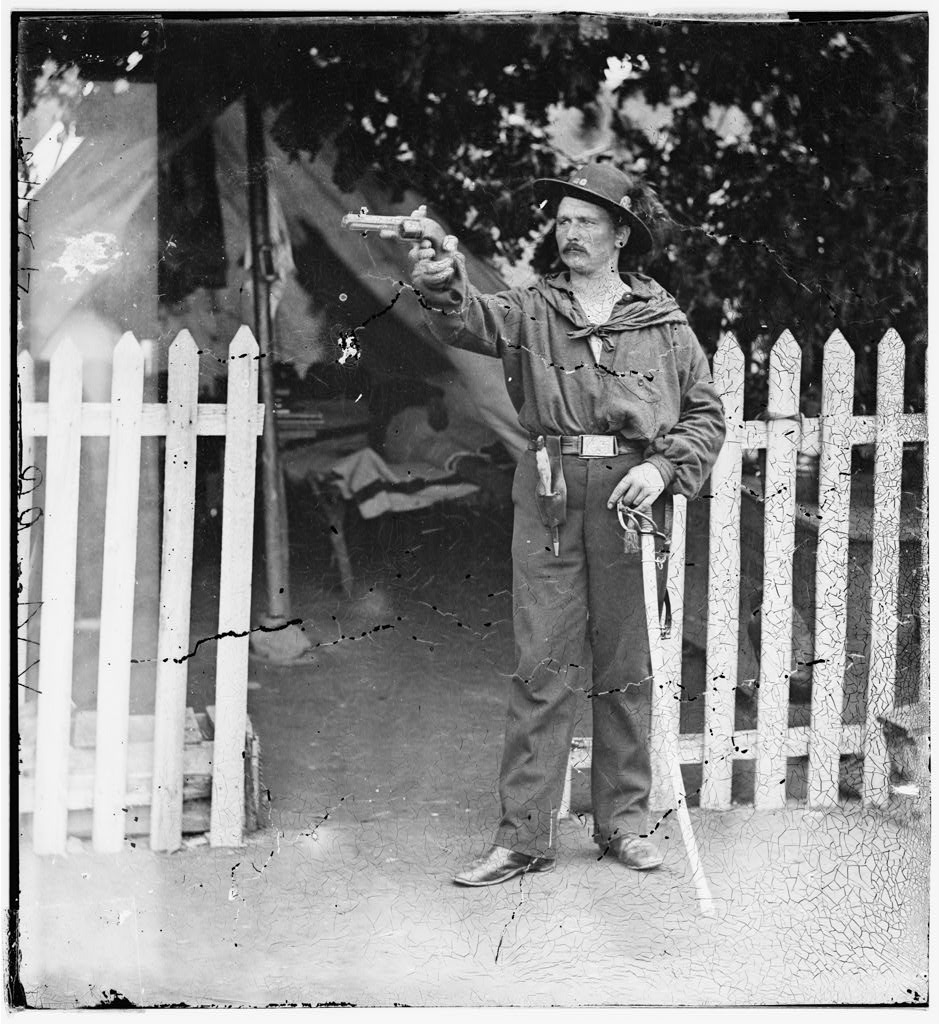
"Captain Schwartz the Sharpshooter" holding what is possibly a Savage 1861 Navy revolver. A cropped version Appears in Francis Miller's "The Photographic History of the Civil War" Vol 5 "Forts and Artillery" .p.125, this officer was a Lt. Col. in the 39th New York Infantry.

== Service ==
This regiment was mustered (assembled) in New York City by the Union Defense Committee, under the leadership of Col. Frederick George D'Utassy by special authority from the War Department during the American Civil War. On May 27, 1861, they deployed to Washington D.C., having been authorized for a period of three years by New York State.

Initially, the regiment was divided into ten companies of men of different national heritage: three German, three Hungarian, one Swiss, one Italian, one French, one Portuguese and Spanish. On May 31, 1863, the regiment was consolidated into four companies: A, B, C and D. The regiment expanded as new companies were recruited in the field. On December 8, 1863, Company E was added; on December 14, 1863, Company F joined. On December 19, 1863, Company G was added; and on December 30, 1863, Company H joined. Companies I and K joined in January, 1864.

Companies A, B, C and D were mustered out in New York city June 24, 1864. Enlistees who were not entitled to be discharged were transferred to other companies within the regiment. Six companies: E, F, G, H, I and K, remained in service. In October, 1864, a new Company D, mustered mostly from Malone, New York joined the regiment for one year. On June 2, 1865, the members of the regiment not eligible to be mustered out were transferred into the 185th Infantry.

The regiment left the New York State May 28, 1861; served at and near Washington, D. C., from June 1, 1861; in the 1st Brigade, 5th Division, Army of Northeastern Virginia, from July 13, 1861; in Blenker's Brigade, Division of Potomac, from August 4, 1861; in Stahel's Brigade, Blenker's Division, Army of the Potomac, from October 15, 1861; in 1st Brigade, same division, Mountain Department, from April, 1862; in White's Brigade, Army of Virginia, at Winchester, Va., from July, 1862; at Harper's Ferry, W. Va., from September, 1862; at Camp Douglass, Chicago, Ill., from September 27, 1862; near Washington, D.C., 1st Brigade, Casey's Division, defenses of Washington, from December, 1862; in January, 1863, in 3d Brigade, Casey's, later Abercrombie's Division, 22d Corps; in 3d Brigade, 3d Division, 2d Corps, Army of the Potomac, from June 25, 1863; in the 3d, and for a time in the Consolidated, Brigade, 1st Division, 2d Corps, Army of the Potomac, from March, 1864; and was honorably discharged and mustered out, under Col. Augustus Funk, July I, 1865, except (new) Company D, which had been mustered out, June 7, 1865, at Alexandria, Va.

During its period of service, 5 officers and 62 enlisted men were killed in action; 3 officers and 49 enlisted men died of wounds received in action; 1 officer and 158 enlisted men died of disease and other causes. In total, 278 men (9 officers and 269 enlistees) died while in service in the regiment. Of those, 1 officer and 99 enlisted men died while captured by the Confederate Army.

== Total strength and casualties ==
The regiment suffered a total of 274 fatalities. Eight officers and 107 enlisted men were killed in action or mortally wounded and 1 officer and 158 enlisted men died of disease.

== Uniform ==
The regiment's uniform was based on that of the 'Bersagliere (Note: The Bersaglieri, are a troop of marksmen in the Italian Army. Originally created in 1836 in the Royal Sardinian Army, (the later Royal Italian Army, they are noted for their distinctive wide-brimmed hats with black western capercaillie feathers worn with the dress uniform. The feathers are also applied to their combat helmets.) troop of marksmen from the Royal Sardinian Army. They wore the distinctive black, brimmed hats, called vaira, (intended to defend the head from sabre blows) decorated with dark cock feathers. Their jackets were six-button tunics with red collars, cuffs, and trim. They wore dark blue trousers trimmed in red at the outseam.They wore their white gaiters in the Chasseur/Bersagliere fashion under the open-end of their trousers.

== Commanders ==
1. Colonel Frederick George D'Utassy — dismissed May 29, 1863
2. Major Major Hugo Hillebrandt — commanded at Gettysburg, wounded on July 3, 1863
3. Major Daniel Woodall — July 30, 1863 - October 5, 1863 (detached from the 1st Delaware Infantry Regiment)
4. Colonel Augustus Funk

== See also ==
- List of New York Civil War regiments
- Italian Americans in the Civil War
- Hispanics in the American Civil War
- 6th Regiment, European Brigade, a Confederate Regiment also named after Giuseppe Garibaldi
