= Hispanics in the American Civil War =

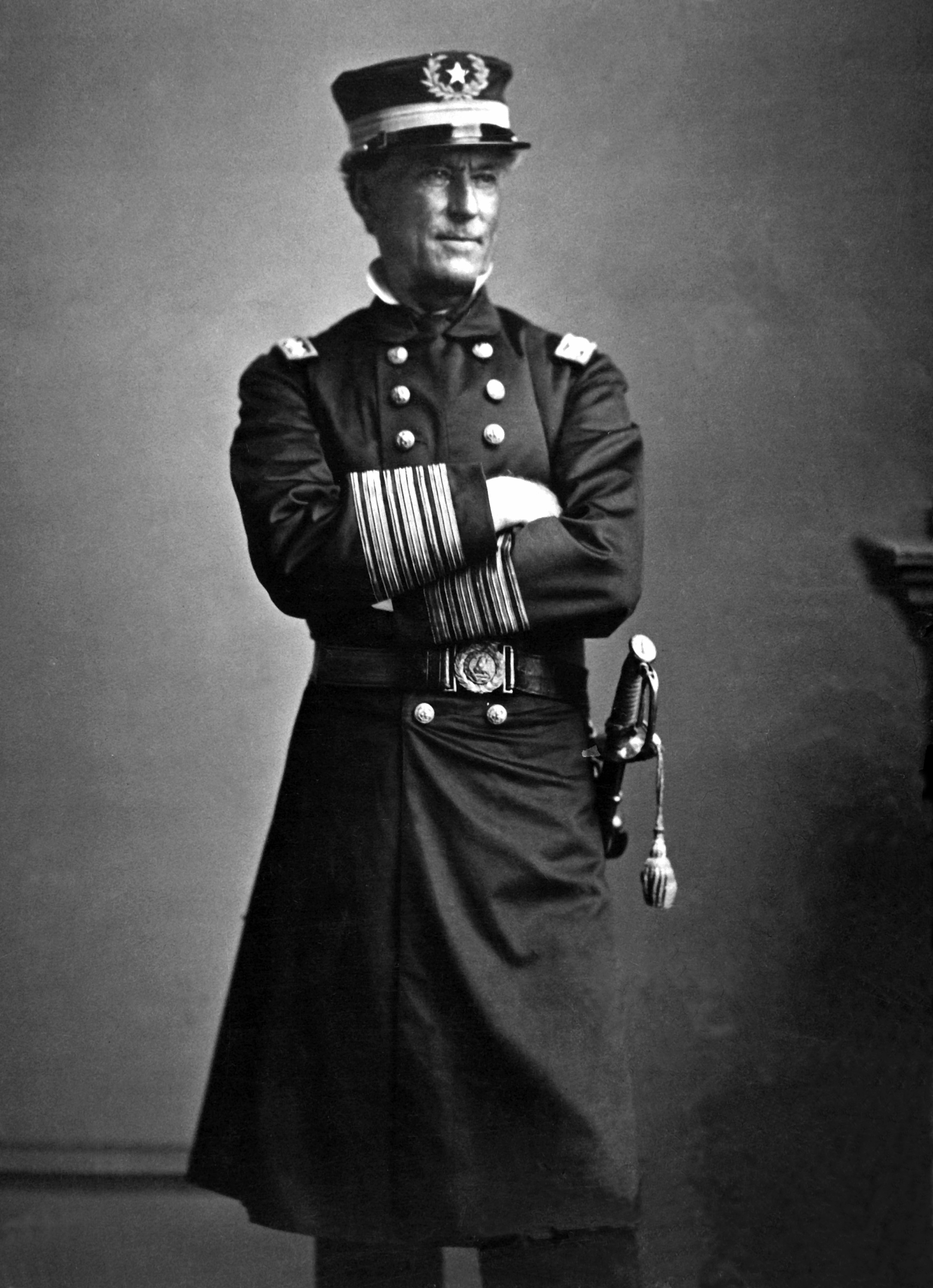
David Farragut

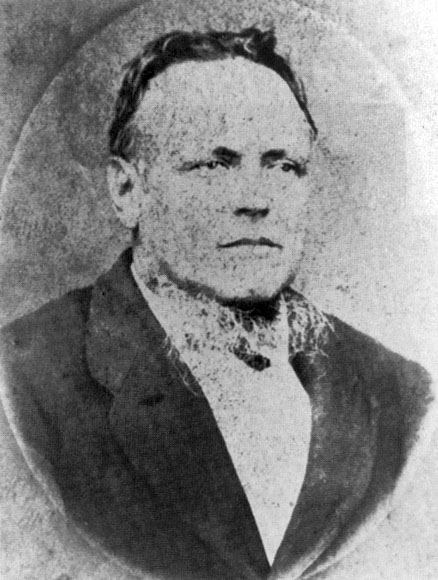
Santos Benavides

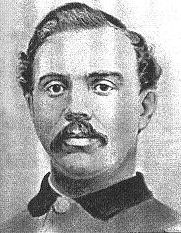
Augusto Rodriguez

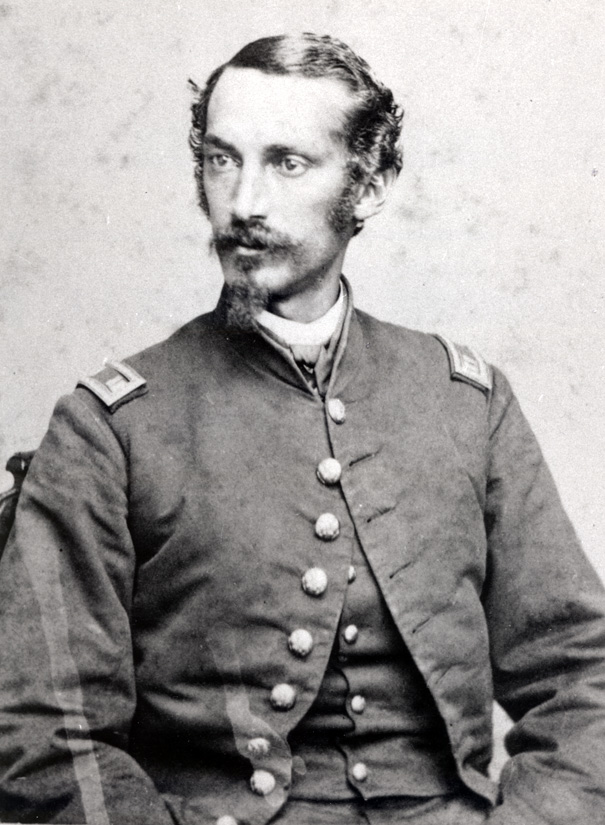
Federico Fernández Cavada

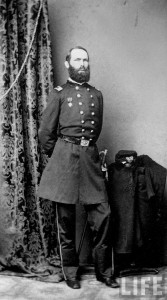
Julius Peter Garesché

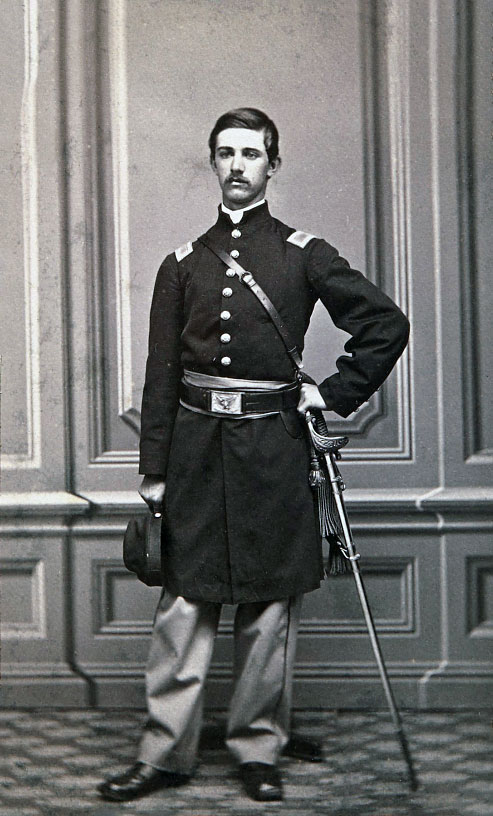
Luis F. Emilio

Hispanics in the American Civil War fought on both the Union and Confederate sides of the conflict. Not all the Hispanics who fought in the American Civil War were "Hispanic Americans" — in other words citizens of the United States. Many of them were Spanish subjects or nationals from countries in the Caribbean, Central and South America. Some were born in what later became a U.S. territory and therefore did not have the right to U.S. citizenship. It is estimated that approximately 3,500 Hispanics, mostly Mexican-Americans, Puerto Ricans and Cubans (Puerto Rico and Cuba were Spanish colonies) living in the United States joined the war: 2,500 for the Confederacy and 1,000 for the Union. This number increased to 10,000 by the end of the war.

Hispanic is an ethnic term employed to categorize any citizen or resident of the United States, of any racial background, of any country, and of any religion, who has at least one ancestor from the people of Spain or is of non-Hispanic origin, but has an ancestor from Mexico, Puerto Rico, Cuba, Central or South America, or some other Hispanic origin. The three largest Hispanic groups in the United States are the Mexican-Americans, Puerto Ricans, and Cubans.

The Union Army was the land force that fought for the Union during the American Civil War. It was also known as the "Federal Army", the "U.S. Army", the "Northern Army" and the "National Army". It consisted of the small United States Army (the regular army), augmented by massive numbers of units supplied by the Northern states, composed of volunteers as well as conscripts.

The "New Mexico Volunteer Infantry", with 157 Hispanic officers, was the Union unit with the most officers of that ethnic background. Besides Colonel Miguel E. Pino and Lieutenant Colonel Jose Maria Valdez who belonged to the 2nd New Mexico Volunteer Infantry, the New Mexico Volunteer Infantry also included Colonel Diego Archuleta (eventually promoted to Brig. Gen.), the commanding officer of the First New Mexico Volunteer Infantry, Colonel Jose G. Gallegos commander of the Third New Mexico Volunteer Infantry, and Lieutenant Colonel Francisco Perea, who commanded Perea's Militia Battalion.

Another unit which was composed of Hispanics was D Company "The Spanish Company" of the Garibaldi Guard, 39th New York Volunteer Infantry Regiment. The company served until July 1, 1865, when it was mustered out at Alexandria, Virginia. They lost during its term of service 119 by death from wounds, and 159 by death from accident, imprisonment or disease, of whom 94 died in prison.

The Confederate Congress provided for a Confederate States Army patterned after the United States Army. It was to consist of a large provisional force to exist only in time of war and a small permanent regular army. The provisional, volunteer army was established by an act of the Confederate Congress passed February 28, 1861, one week before the act which established the permanent regular army organization, passed March 6, 1861. Although the two forces were to exist concurrently, little was done to organize the Confederate regular army.

Amongst the Confederate units that either were composed entirely of Hispanics or had a significant number of Hispanics were the 5th Regiment (Spanish Regiment) of the "European Brigade", "Cazadores Espanoles Regiment" and the "Louisiana Tigers", all from Louisiana; the "Spanish Guards" and the "55th Infantry" both from Alabama and "Florida's 2nd Infantry".

Hispanics held various grades of ranks in the military, the highest being full Admiral of the Union Navy. Three Hispanics were awarded the Medal of Honor, the highest military decoration for heroism awarded by the United States. Hispanic women also participated, such was the case of Loreta Janeta Velazquez, a Cuban woman who disguised as a male, fought and spied for the Confederacy.

== Notable military personnel ==
The following is an uncompleted list of notable Hispanics who participated in the American Civil War. Their names are placed in accordance to the highest rank that they held during their military service.

=== Union forces ===
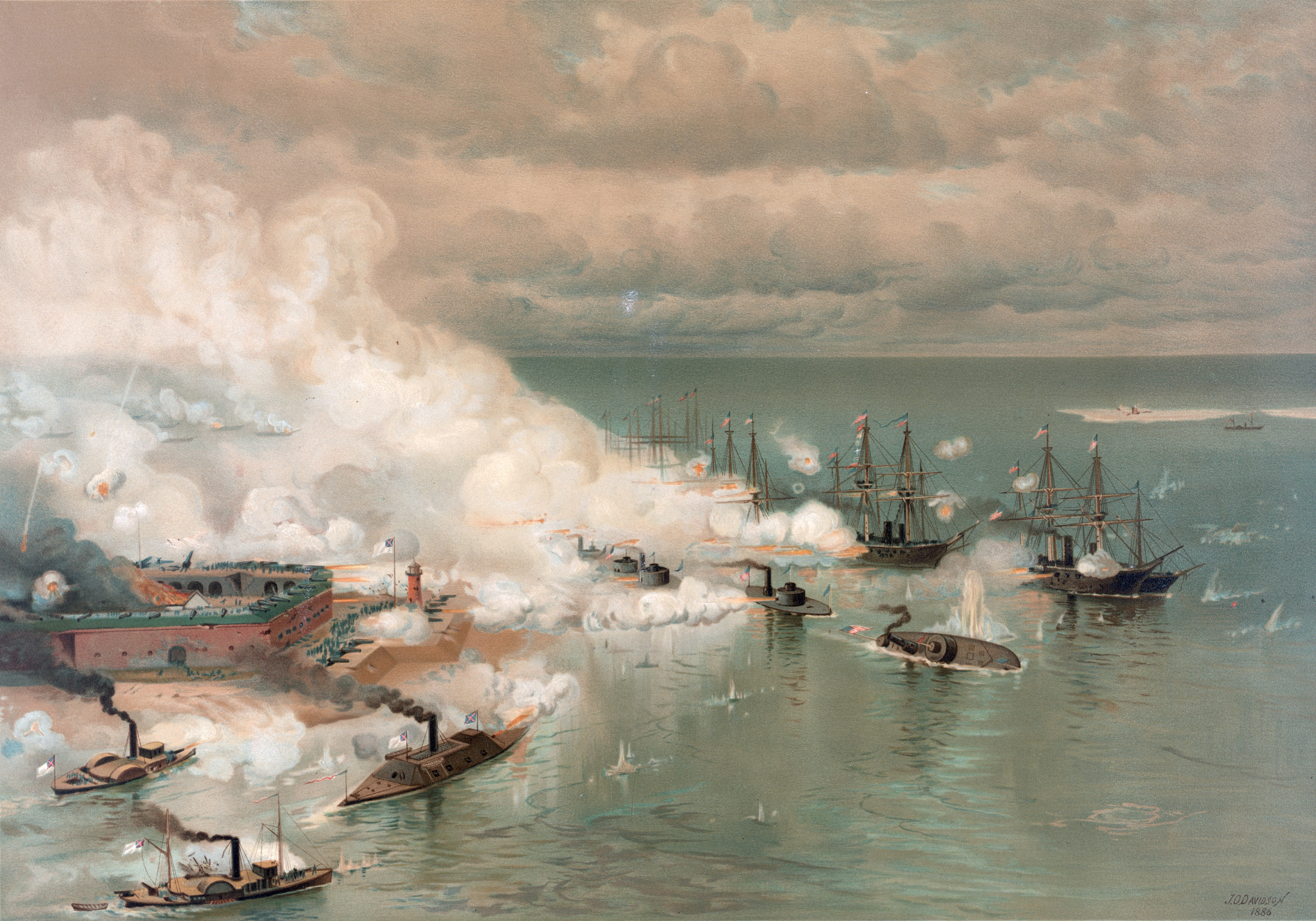
Battle of Mobile Bay by Louis Prang

- Admiral David Farragut (1801–1870) – Son of Spanish-born Jordi Farragut, Farragut was promoted to vice admiral on December 21, 1864, and to full admiral on July 25, 1866, after the war, thereby becoming the first person to be named full admiral in the Navy's history. Farragut's greatest victory was the Battle of Mobile Bay on August 5, 1864. Mobile, Alabama at the time was the Confederacy's last major port open on the Gulf of Mexico. The bay was heavily mined with tethered naval mines, also known as torpedoes. When the USS Tecumseh, one of the ships under his command, struck a mine and went down, Farragut shouted through a trumpet from his flagship to the USS Brooklyn, "What's the trouble?" "Torpedoes!" was the reply, to which Farragut then shouted his now famous words "Damn the torpedoes! Full speed ahead!" The fleet succeeded in entering the bay. Farragut then triumphed over the opposition of heavy batteries in Fort Morgan and Fort Gaines to defeat the squadron of Admiral Franklin Buchanan. Farragut was promoted to vice admiral on December 21, 1864, and to full admiral on July 25, 1866, after the war, thereby becoming the first person to be named full admiral in the Navy's history.
- Brigadier General Diego Archuleta (1814–1884) – was a member of the Mexican Army who fought against the United States in the Mexican–American War. During the American Civil War he served in the New Mexico Militia. He fought with the 1st New Mexico Militia Infantry in the Battle of Valverde and became the first Hispanic to reach the military rank of brigadier general. He was later appointed an Indian Agent by President Abraham Lincoln.
- Brevet Brigadier General (Note: Brevet is a temporary authorization for a person to hold a higher rank which was noted in the officer's title, Example: Brevet Brigadier General Pleasants.) Henry Clay Pleasants (1833–1880) – was born and raised in Buenos Aires, Argentina, to an American father and a Spanish mother. Pleasants, who at the time was a Lieutenant Colonel, devised a plan to break the Confederate stranglehold on the city of Petersburg, Virginia. He organized the building of a tunnel filled with explosives under the Confederate lines outside the city. His actions led to the Battle of the Crater on July 30, 1864. It was supposed to give the Union troops an opportunity to break the defense of Petersburg. The poorly executed "Battle of the Crater" failed and his troops continued to fight for eight more months. Pleasants, however, was promoted to Brevet Brigadier General.

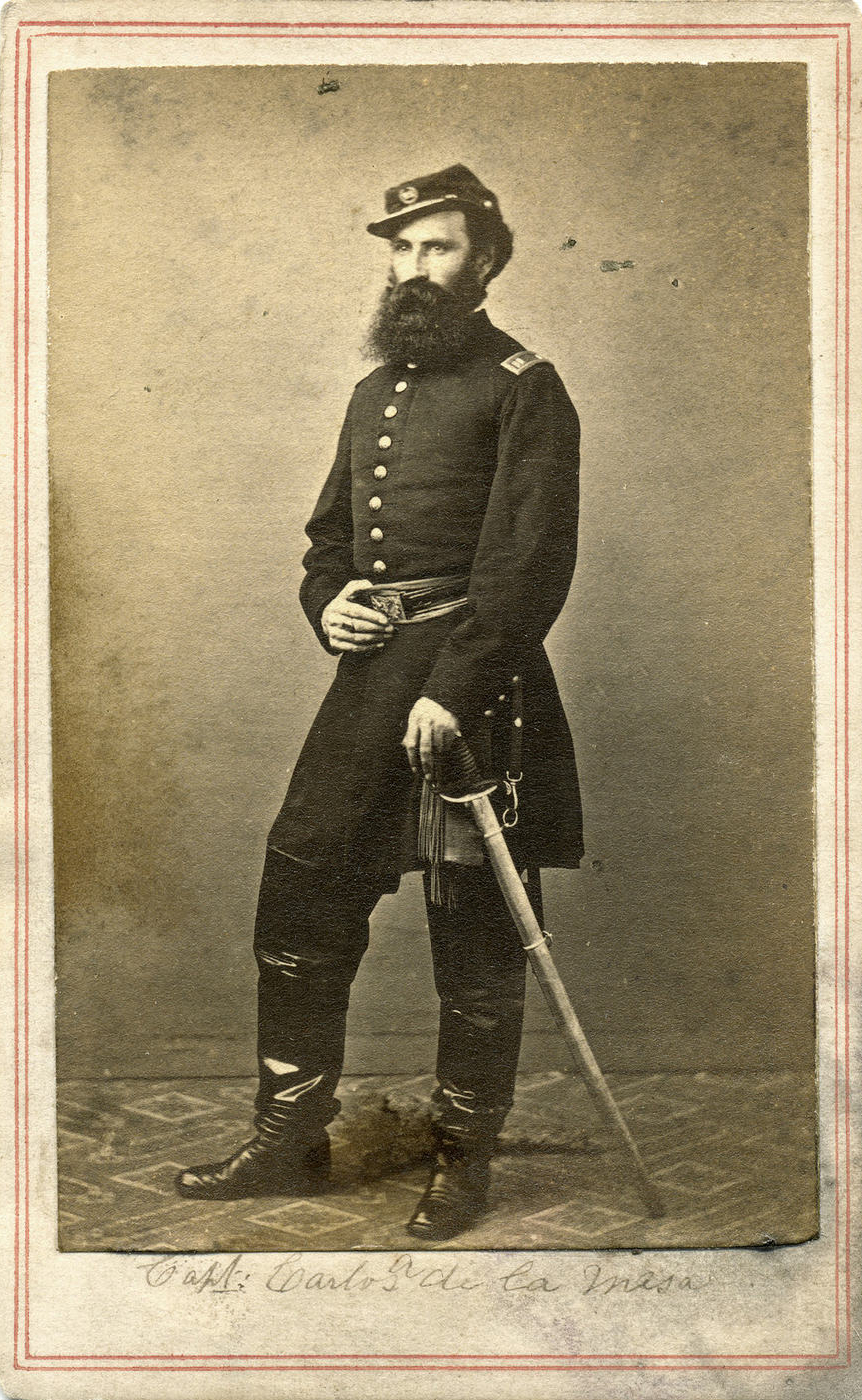
Colonel Carlos Alvarez de la Mesa

- Colonel Carlos Alvarez de la Mesa (1828–1872) – Alvarez de la Mesa, a resident of Worcester, Mass., was a Spanish national who fought at Gettysburg for the Union Army in the Spanish Company of the "Garibaldi Guard" of the 39th New York State Volunteers. He received a stomach contusion at Gettysburg and was medically discharged on September 30, 1863, for intermittent fever and chronic ankle ulcer. Over 200 letters written by Carlos Alvarez de la Mesa during the Civil War were donated to the NY State Military Museum. Alvarez de la Mesa is the grandfather of Major General Terry de la Mesa Allen, Sr. commanding general of the First Infantry Division in North Africa and Sicily, and later the commander of the 104th Infantry Division during World War II.

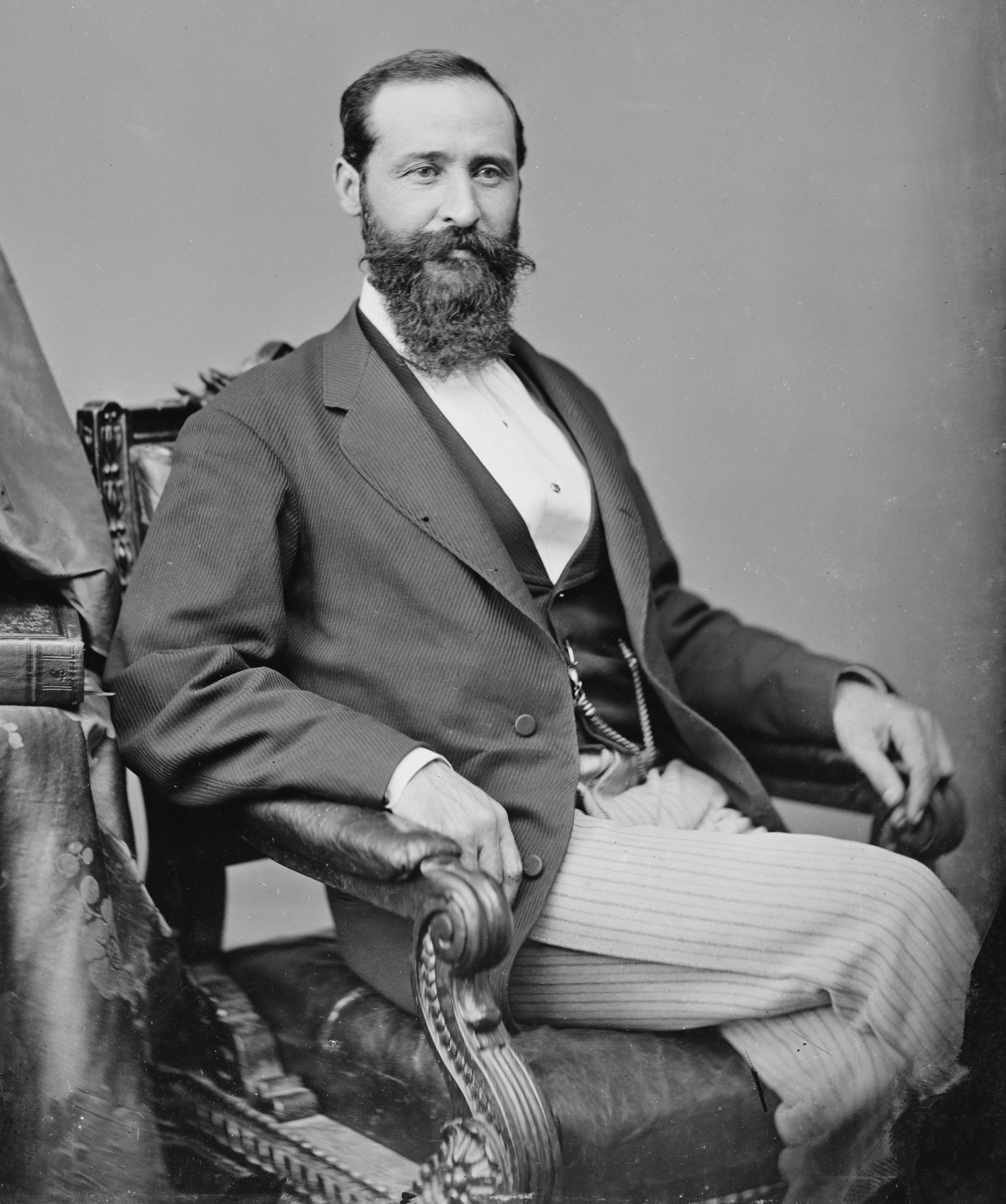
Lieutenant Colonel José Francisco Chaves

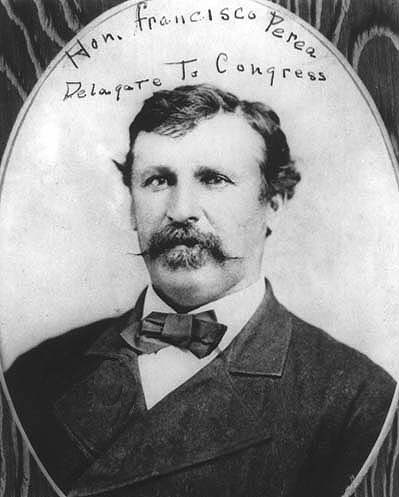
Lieutenant Colonel Francisco Perea

- Colonel José Guadalupe Gallegos (1828–1867) – Gallegos was the Post Commander at Hatch Ranch on Nov 22, 1861. His unit was under special order 187, Nov 9, 1861 to construct a road between Las Vegas and Fort Union. Gallegos served as commander of the Third New Mexico Volunteer Infantry in the Army of the United States from August 26, 1861, until March 6, 1862. This was just prior to the Battle of Glorieta Pass, fought from March 26 to 28, 1862, the decisive battle of the New Mexico Campaign.
- Colonel Miguel E. Pino – Prior to the Civil War, Pino was the Commanding Officer of an expedition which was organized in Santa Fe, New Mexico, against the Navajos. During the Civil War, Pino commanded the 2nd Regiment of New Mexico Volunteers, which fought at the Battle of Valverde from February 20 to February 21, 1862, and the Battle of Glorieta Pass from March 26 to March 28, 1862. Pino and his men played an instrumental role in the defeat Confederate Army, derailing any plans of an invasion of New Mexico.
- Colonel Federico Fernández Cavada (1831–1871) – Cuban-born Cavada commanded the 114th Pennsylvania Volunteer infantry regiment when it took the field in the Peach Orchard at Gettysburg. Because of his artistic talents, he was assigned to the Hot Air Balloon unit of the Union Army. From the air he sketched what he observed of the enemy movements. On April 19, 1862, Federico sketched enemy positions from Thaddeus Lowe's Constitution balloon during the Peninsula Campaign in Virginia. Cavada was captured during the Battle of Gettysburg and sent to Libby Prison in Richmond, Virginia. Cavada was released in 1864 and later published a book entitled "LIBBY LIFE: Experiences of A Prisoner of War in Richmond, VA, 1863–64", which told about the cruel treatment which he received in the Confederate prison
- Lieutenant Colonel José Francisco Chaves (1833–1904) – Chaves had been an officer in the Mexican Army before he joined the Union Army. He entered the Union Army as major of the 1st New Mexico Infantry Regiment. Chaves fought in the Battle of Valverde in the American Civil War alongside Colonel Kit Carson. Chaves later became the first Secretary of Education for New Mexico.
- Lieutenant Colonel Julius Peter Garesché (1821–1862) – When the American Civil War broke out, Garesché declined a commission as brigadier general of volunteers, and was made Chief of Staff, with the rank of lieutenant colonel in the regular army, to Maj. Gen. William S. Rosecrans. In this capacity he participated in the operations of the Army of the Cumberland at the Battle of Stones River. Riding with General Rosecrans toward the Round Forest, Garesché was decapitated by a cannonball.
- Lieutenant Colonel Francisco Perea (1830–1913) – In December 1861, Perea organized and commanded Perea's Militia Battalion for the defense of New Mexico. Perea was later elected as a Republican to the Thirty-eighth Congress. He served in said position for two years (March 4, 1863 – March 3, 1865).
- Lieutenant Colonel Jose Maria Valdez (1841–1884) – Valdez commanded the 3rd New Mexico volunteers at Valverde. Both he and Colonel Pino were cited by Union General Canby in his official report for their efforts in this action.

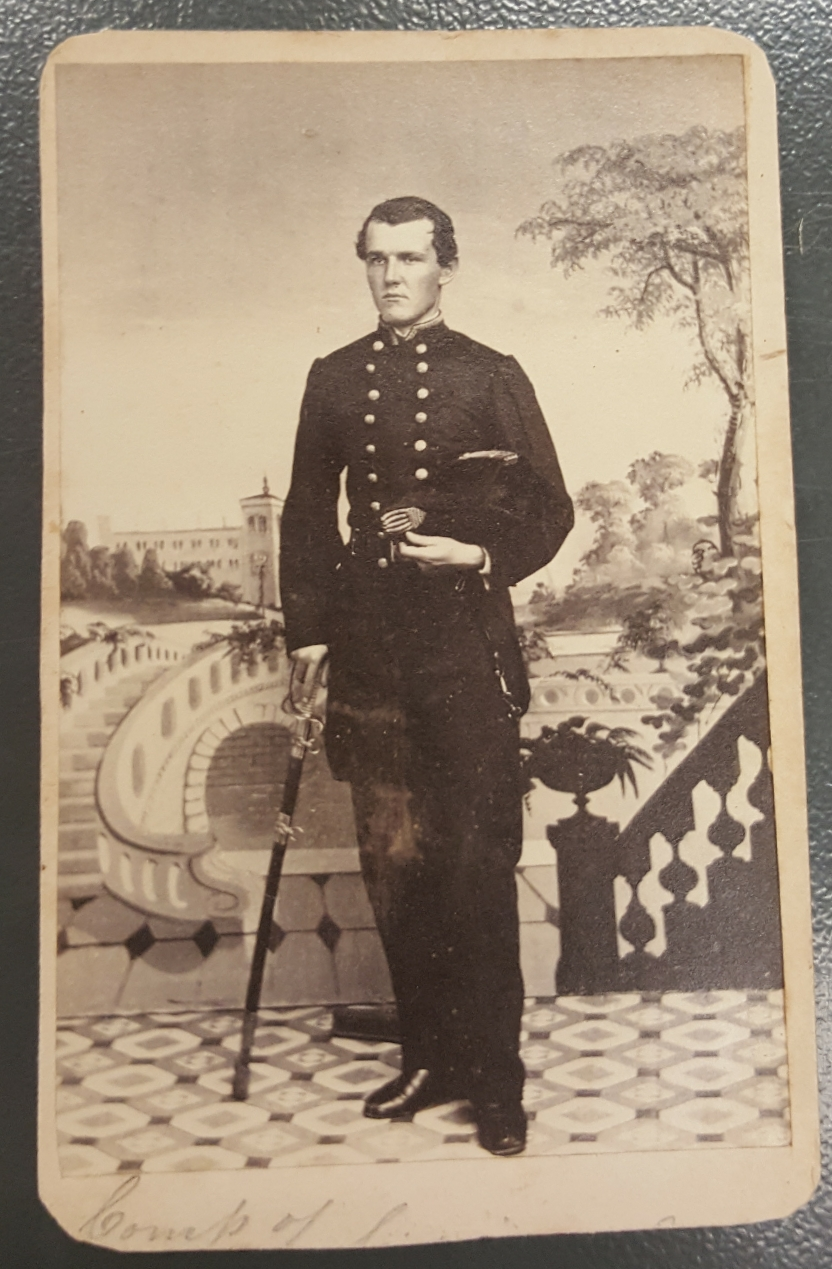
Cipriano Andrade (retired in 1901 with the rank of Rear Admiral)

- Major Manuel Antonio Chaves (1818–1889) – Chaves was in charge of Fort Fauntleroy in northwestern New Mexico. On March 28, 1862, Chaves led 490 New Mexico volunteers on a daring raid. As the main Union troops fought the Confederates, Chaves's men lowered themselves down a 200-foot slope, taking a small Texan guard completely by surprise and capturing the Confederates' supply train. They destroyed the wagons and burned all the supplies.
- Major Salvador Vallejo (1813–1876) – Vallejo organized First Battalion of Native Cavalry one of the California units which served with the Union Army in the West. Companies of Vallejo's unit saw action in the Bald Hills War, and against the Mason Henry Gang in Central California, and late in the war the whole unit was sent east to Arizona Territory, to defend it from the raids of the Apache. Like most California units they never engaged the Confederates and therefore Vallejo did not have a battlefield role in the Civil War, but did hold the West for the Union.
- Captain Román Antonio Baca – Baca was an officer in the New Mexico Volunteers a Union force. In 1862, he became the first Hispanic spy for the United States.
- Captain Stephen Vincent Benet (1827–1895) – the grandson of an immigrant from Minorca (one of the Spanish Balearic Islands). During the Civil War he taught the science of gunnery at West Point. He would eventually retire as a brigadier general.
- Captain Adolfo Fernández Cavada (1832–1871) – Cavada served in the 114th Pennsylvania Volunteers at Gettysburg with his brother, Colonel Federico Fernandez Cavada. He served with distinction in the Army of the Potomac from Fredericksburg to Gettysburg and was a "special aide-de-camp" to General Andrew A. Humphreys.
- Captain Luis F. Emilio (1844–1918) – The son of a Spanish immigrant, Emilio was among the group of original officers of the 54th selected by Massachusetts War Governor John Albion Andrew. Captain Emilio emerged from the ferocious assault on Fort Wagner on July 18, 1863, as the regiment's acting commander, since all of the other ranking officers had been killed or wounded. He fought with the 54th for over three years of dangerous combat.
- Captain Antonio Maria de la Guerra (1825–1881) – Mayor of Santa Barbara, California, several times a member of the Santa Barbara County Board of Supervisors, California State Senator and Captain of California Volunteers in the American Civil War.
- Captain José Gabriel Luperón (1836–1873) – Luperón was a Dominican immigrant who had previously served in the Dominican Army during the Dominican War of Independence. He attained the rank of captain of the Union Army.
- Lieutenant Augusto Rodríguez (1841–1880) – Rodríguez was a Puerto Rican native who served as an officer in the 15th Connecticut Volunteer Infantry, of the Union Army. Rodríguez served in the defenses of Washington, D.C., and led his men in the Battles of Fredericksburg and Wyse Fork.
- Third Assistant Engineer Cipriano Andrade (1840–1911) – Andrade was born in Tampico, Mexico. He joined the Union Navy in 1861, and served on board the USS Lancaster. During the Civil War, Andrade served on board the USS Lancaster (1861–1863) and the USS Pontiac (1863–1865) as a third assistant engineer. His position was the most junior marine engineer of the ship. responsible for electrical, sewage treatment (resulting in the pejorative pun "turd engineer"), lube oil, bilge, and oily water separation systems. Depending on usage. and his position sometimes required that he assist the third mate in maintaining proper operation of the lifeboats. On July 1, 1901, he was transferred to the retired list of the Navy with the rank of rear admiral.

=== Confederate forces ===
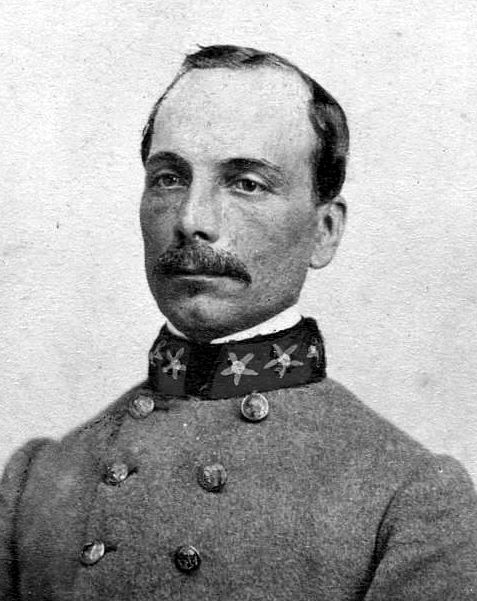
Colonel Ambrosio José Gonzales

- Colonel Ambrosio José Gonzales (1818–1893) – Gonzales, a native Cuban, settled in South Carolina. He was volunteering during the bombardment of Fort Sumter and became an inspector of coastal defences. In 1862, he was assigned as Chief of Artillery to the Department of South Carolina, Georgia and Florida. In 1864, he served as artillery commander at the Battle of Honey Hill during Sherman's March to the Sea. President Jefferson Davis declined promotion requests for the rank of Brigadier General six times. It is believed that Gonzales's early experience with (unsuccessful) Cuban filibusters, and his contentious relationships with Confederate officers in Richmond, were not helpful to him; moreover Davis's dislike for P. G. T. Beauregard, who was a schoolmate of Gonzales's and the proponent of several of the requests, compounded his difficulties.
- Colonel Leonidas M. Martin (1824–1904) – Martin organized and was a major in the 10th Texas Cavalry. Promoted to Colonel was placed in charge of the 5th Texas Partisan Rangers under the command of Colonel Thomas C. Bass. Martin participated in the Battle of Honey Springs, the largest battle fought in Indian Territory, fought on July 17, 1863. The Union Forces were victorious and a result of the Confederate defeat in this battle was that the Confederates were always short on supplies in the Indian Territory forcing the Texas Cavalry to abandon the territory.

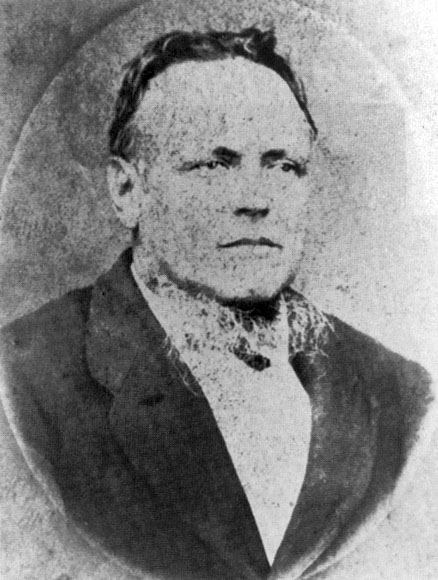
Colonel Santos Benavides

- Colonel Santos Benavides (1823–1891) – Benavides commanded the 33rd Texas Cavalry Regiment. He was the highest ranking Tejano in the Confederate Army. On March 19, 1864, he defended Laredo against the Union's First Texas Cavalry, whose commander was Colonel Edmund J. Davis, a Florida native who had previously offered Benavides a Union generalship, and defeated the Union forces. Probably his greatest contribution to the Confederacy was securing passage of Confederate cotton to Matamoros, Tamaulipas, Mexico, in 1863. On March 18, 1864, Major Alfred Holt led a force of about two hundred men from the command of Col. Davis near Brownsville, Texas, to destroy five thousand bales of cotton stacked at the San Agustín Plaza. Colonel Santos Benavides commanded forty-two men and repelled three Union attacks at the Zacate Creek in what is known as the Battle of Laredo.

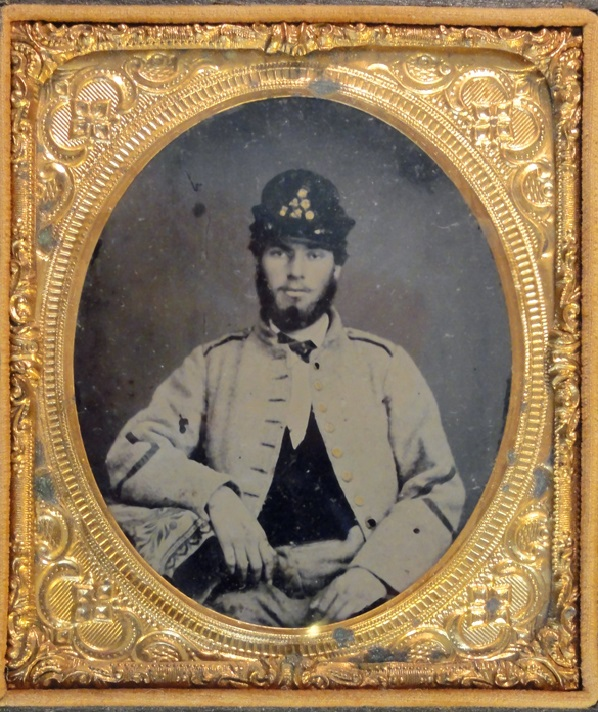
Captain Michael Philip Usina (1861)

- Lieutenant Colonel Paul Francis de Gournay (1828–1904) – De Gournay was a Cuban who fought for independence from Spain and afterwards settled in Louisiana. In 1861, he equipped an artillery battery at his own expense and led it during the Peninsula Campaign in Virginia. Later, he became the commander of the 12th Battalion, Louisiana Heavy Artillery. He served during the Siege of Port Hudson, and with its surrender became a prisoner for the rest of the war.
- Major David Camden DeLeón (1816–1872) – DeLeón a.k.a. "The Fighting Doctor", came from a Sephardic Jewish family. He was the first Hispanic to graduate from an Ivy League School (University of Pennsylvania – 1836). In 1864, he became the first Surgeon General of the Confederate States. The President of the Confederate States Jefferson Davis, assigned him the task of organizing the medical department of the Confederate Army.
- Captain Michael Philip Usina (1840–1903) – was a member of the Confederate States Navy. He was born in St. Augustine, Florida, to Spanish parents. As captain of several blockade runners, Usina managed to avoid capture on his many successful missions. Usina fought in Co. B in the 8th Georgia Infantry of the Confederate Army before being transferred to the Navy. He was wounded and captured in the Battle of Manassas, but managed to escape and reach the Southern lines.

=== Hispanic women in the Civil War ===
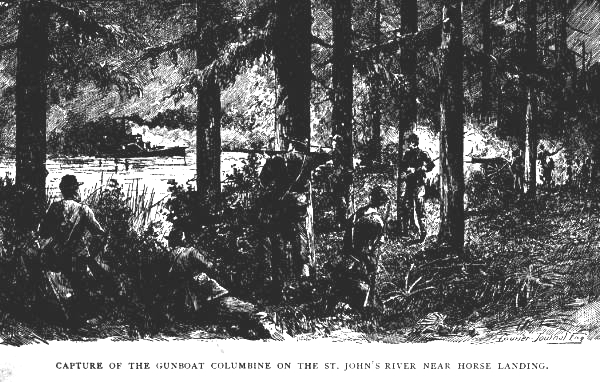
The Capture of the USS Columbine in the "Battle of Horse Landing"

Many women participated in the American Civil War. Two of the most notable Hispanic women to participate in that conflict were Lola Sánchez and Loreta Janeta Velazquez. The similarities between them were that both were Cuban born and both served for the Confederacy. However, the difference between them was that one served as a spy while the other disguised herself as a male and fought in various battles.

- Lola Sánchez (1844–1895) – Sánchez was born in Armstrong, Florida of Cuban descent. She became upset when her father was accused of being a Confederate spy by the Union Forces and sent to prison. This event angered and inspired her to become a Confederate spy. The Union Army had occupied her residence in Palatka, Florida and she overheard the officer's plans of a raid. She alerted the Confederates under the command of Capt. John Jackson Dickison. Because of the information which she provided, the Confederate soldiers were able to surprise the Union troops, in what became known as the "Battle of Horse Landing", and capture the USS Columbine, a Union warship in the only known incident in U.S. history where a cavalry unit captured and sank an enemy gunboat.
- Loreta Janeta Velazquez a.k.a. "Lieutenant Harry Buford" (1842–1897) – Velazquez was a Cuban woman who masqueraded as a male Confederate soldier during the Civil War. She enlisted in the Confederate Army in 1861, without her soldier-husband's knowledge. She fought at Bull Run, Ball's Bluff and Fort Donelson, but her gender was discovered while in New Orleans and she was discharged. Undeterred, she reenlisted and fought at Shiloh, until unmasked once more. She then became a spy, working in both male and female guises.

=== Medal of Honor ===
The Medal of Honor is the highest military decoration awarded by the United States government. It is bestowed by the President in the name of Congress on members of the United States Armed Forces who distinguish themselves through "conspicuous gallantry and intrepidity at the risk of his or her life above and beyond the call of duty while engaged in an action against an enemy of the United States".

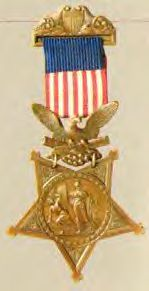
Medal of Honor
(Army version)

Medal of Honor
(Navy version)
- Corporal Joseph H. De Castro (1844–1892) – De Castro served in Company I, 19th Massachusetts Infantry and was the first Hispanic-American Medal of Honor recipient. During the battle, De Castro attacked a confederate flag bearer from the 19th Virginia Infantry regiment, with the staff of his own colors and seized the opposing regiment's flag, handing the prize over to General Alexander S. Webb. General Webb is quoted as saying:

At the instant a man broke through my lines and thrust a rebel battle flag into my hands. He never said a word and darted back. It was Corporal Joseph H. De Castro, one of my color bearers. He had knocked down a color bearer in the enemy's line with the staff of the Massachusetts State colors, seized the falling flag and dashed it to me.

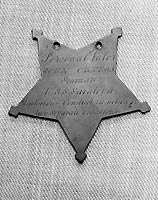
Reverse of the Medal of Honor awarded to Seaman John Ortega

- Seaman Philip Bazaar – Bazaar was a resident of Massachusetts, who joined the Union Navy at New Bedford. He was assigned to the USS Santiago de Cuba, a wooden, brigantine-rigged, side-wheel steamship under the command of Rear Admiral David D. Porter. In the latter part of 1864, Union General Ulysses S. Grant ordered an assault on Fort Fisher, a Confederate stronghold. which protected the vital trading routes of Wilmington's port, at North Carolina. On January 12, 1865, both ground and naval Union forces attempted a second land assault, after the failure of the first. During the land assault, Bazaar and 5 other crew members carried dispatches from Rear Admiral Porter to Major General Alfred Terry, while under heavy fire from the Confederates to Major General Alfred Terry. Bazaar was awarded the Medal of Honor for his actions.
- Seaman John Ortega (1840-????) – Ortega was a resident of Pennsylvania who joined the Union Navy in his adopted hometown in Pennsylvania. Ortega was assigned to the USS Saratoga during the Civil War. The USS Saratoga was ordered to proceed to Charleston, South Carolina, for duty in the South Atlantic Blockading Squadron. Ortega was a member of the landing parties from the ship who made several raids in August and September in 1864, which resulted in the capture of many prisoners and the taking or destruction of substantial quantities of ordnance, ammunition, and supplies. A number of buildings, bridges, and salt works were destroyed during the expedition. For his actions Seaman John Ortega was awarded the Medal of Honor and promoted to acting master's mate. He was the first Hispanic member of the U.S. Navy to receive the Medal of Honor.

== Hispanic Union units ==
=== The 1st California Cavalry Battalion ===
The 1st Battalion, Native California Cavalry, was raised in California in 1863 to 1864 and served on the border in Arizona and New Mexico. All officers and non-commissioned officers had to be fluent in Spanish, and the language of command was Spanish. The Native California Cavalry were one of the last U.S. military mounted regiments equipped with lances.

=== The Garibaldi Guard, D Company "The Spanish Company" ===
The 39th New York Volunteer Infantry Regiment, also known as the "Garibaldi Guard", was mustered into the U. S. service at New York, May 28, 1861. The unit was composed of three Hungarian companies, three German, one Swiss, one Italian, one French, one Portuguese and one Spanish. The Spanish unit, 4th D Company, consisted of men from different Latin American countries. Puerto Ricans and Cubans were Spanish subjects at the time and inscribed as Spaniards. The unit fought in the Battle of Gettysburg, participated in the Mine Run campaign and in the Wilderness campaign. The battalion participated in the pursuit of General Robert E. Lee's army and performed various routine duties in the vicinity of Richmond until July 1, 1865, when it was mustered out at Alexandria.

The following is a list of the names of some of the Hispanics officers of the 4th D Company "The Spanish Company" of the Garibaldi Guard: Captain Joseph Torrens, 1st Lt. Jose Romero, 2nd Lt. (later Colonel) Carlos Alvarez de la Mesa and 1st Sgt. Francisco Luque.

=== New Mexico Volunteer Infantry Regiment ===
Mustered in August 1861, the New Mexico Volunteer Infantry Regiment was the Union Unit with the most officers of Hispanic background. On February 21, 1862, these units fought against Confederate Brigadier General Henry H. Sibley and his troops in the Battle of Valverde in February and the Battle of Glorieta Pass. In January 1864, Colonel Kit Carson led a detachment of nearly 400 in the Battle of Canyon de Chelly. Later that year Carson led a detachment at the first Battle of Adobe Walls. Among the last engagements of the war in which the units participated was the Battle of Aro Pass, fought on July 5, 1865. The regiment was mustered out on September 30, 1866.

== Hispanic Confederate units ==
=== European Brigades and the Louisiana Tigers ===
The 5th Regiment of the "European Brigade" was a home guard brigade of New Orleans, Louisiana, made up of 800 Hispanics who were descendants of immigrants from the Canary Islands. The brigade, under the command of Brigadier General William E. Starke, was assigned to defend the city. Louisiana also had a unit called the "Cazadores Espanoles Regiment" (Spanish Hunters Regiment) and the "Louisiana Tigers", commanded by Major Chatham Roberdeau Wheat, which had men from Spain, Cuba, Puerto Rico, Mexico, and other Latin American countries. The units fought at the Battles of Antietam and Gettysburg.

The following is a list of the names of some of the Hispanics officers of the 5th Regiment of the "European Brigade": Capt. Domingo Fatjo, Capt. Magin Puig, Capt. Jose Quintana, Capt. A. Pons Valencia, 1st Lt. Jose Albarez, 1st Lt. J. Barba, 1st Lt. John Fernandez, 1st Lt. S. J. Font, 1st Lt. Eduardo Villa, 1st Lt. Antonio Robira, 1st Lt. Antonio Helizo, 2nd Lt. Dormian Campo, 2nd Lt. Lorenzo Carbo, 2nd Lt. J. B. Cassanova, 2nd Lt. Eduardo Deu, 2nd Lt. Juan Fernandez, 2nd Lt. A. Fornaris, 2nd Lt. Valentin Hamsen, 2nd Lt. Juan Parra, 2nd Lt. Antonio Mercadal, 2nd Lt. R. Martinez, 3rd Lt. (Note: Unlike the other military units the European Brigades also had the rank of Third Lieutenant) Antonio Barrera, 3rd Lt. Edward Bermudez, 3rd Lt. Jose Bernal, 3rd Lt. Candelario Caceres, 3rd Lt. C. Garcia, 3rd Lt. Bernardo Heres, 3rd Lt. Bernardo Rodriguez, 3rd Lt. Jose Salor and 3rd Lt. F. Suarez.

Among the Hispanic officers of the "Cazadores Espanoles Regiment" are the following: Lt. Col. J. M. Anquera, Capt. Jose Anguera, Capt. S. G. Fabio, 2nd Lt. Ceferino Monasteria, 1st Lt. Vicente Planellas, 1st Lt. L. Roca and Surgeon Francisco Ribot.

=== The Spanish Guards ===
The home guard brigade of Mobile, Alabama, made of Hispanics, was called "The Spanish Guards". The guard served as part of the Mobile County Reserves. Even though it was disbanded on April 12, 1865, many of its men joined the other Confederate forces and surrendered with General Richard Taylor, at Citronelle, Alabama, on May 4, 1865. Various brigades which had a significant number of Hispanic soldiers and which fought at the Battles of Antietam and Gettysburg were Alabama's 55th Infantry and Florida's 2nd Infantry.

The following Hispanic officers served with the Alabama forces: Maj. F. A. Moreno, 1st Lt. Andrew J. Pou, 2nd Lt. Jerome Eslava and 2nd Lt,. M. Franciscoa. Lt. Col. William Baya and 2nd Lt. Francis Baya served with the Florida Infantry.

=== Confederate units of Texas ===
Besides serving in the "Benavides Regiment", many Hispanics who were from Texas served in other units of the Confederate Army. Known as Tejanos, they fought in the Battles of Gaines' Mill, Second Bull Run, Antietam, Fredericksburg, Gettysburg, the Wilderness, and Appomattox Court House as members of the Sixth and Eighth Texas Infantry and of Hood's Texas Brigade under the command of Col. John Bell Hood. Some Tejanos marched across the deserts of West Texas to secure the Mesilla Valley as members of Charles L. Pyron's company which were later incorporated into Gen. Henry Hopkins Sibley's Confederate Army of New Mexico and fought at the battle of Valverde.

This is a unique flag flown by Maltby's company, a unit that was officially part of the 8th Texas Infantry Regiment. In 1861, William Maltby, a journalist from Corpus Christi, raised a company of eighty men to defend Mustang Island and Aransas Pass. The unit, composed of about two-thirds Anglo and German recruits and one-third Mexican, was tired of Union landing parties continually attacking the Texas coast. This beautiful flag was presented to Captain William H. Maltby and his company on the steps of the old Corpus Christi City Courthouse in 1861 by Miss Mary Woessner. The flag was made at Dr. Robertson's home by Mrs. Robertson, Mrs. Lovenskiold, Mrs. Swift and her daughter Grace. The flag was constructed from two layers of light red wool cloth displaying a blue St. Andrew's cross. Twelve white cotton stars formed a twenty-two-inch circle in the center of the flag. A large lone star tilted in the center of the cross proclaimed it the flag of Texas. In mid-1863, Confederate authorities assigned Maltby's company the unenviable task of defending a primitive earthen fortification on the northern tip of Mustang Island, known as Fort Semmes. A few months later, a massive Union amphibious invasion force fought its way from Brownsville to the Texas coast. More than two thousand well-equipped Yankee troops, supported by a powerful fleet, attacked the one hundred hapless defenders of the fort. Faced with such overwhelming odds, Maltby and his men surrendered without a fight. One of the Union regiments, the Fifteenth Maine, captured the unusual flag flying over the fort and returned it to its home state, where it remained until 1927. Sources: "Texas Flags" by Robert Maberry jr. 2001, page 100. "Maltby Collection" Corpus Christi Public Libraries Digital Archives Collection.

== Post-war ==
After the war, the Confederate Army ceased to exist and many of the volunteer units of the Union were mustered out. Most of the former soldiers went home and returned to the civilian activities that they had prior to the war. Others continued in the military and joined the regular Army and Navy.

Among the notable Hispanics who served in the war and who continued in the military was Admiral David Farragut. Farragut was promoted to admiral on July 25, 1866. His last active service was in command of the European Squadron from 1867 to 1868, with the screw frigate USS Franklin as his flagship. Farragut remained on active duty for the rest of his life, an honor accorded to only six other US naval officers.

Both brothers, Colonel Federico and Captain Adolfo Fernández Cavada were named U.S. consuls in Cuba. Federico was appointed United States consul at Trinidad and his brother Adolfo appointed United States consul at Cienfuegos. Both brothers resigned their positions upon the Cuban insurrection against Spanish rule that became known as Cuba's Ten Years' War (1868–1878). Together they joined the insurgents and Federico was named General for the District of Trinidad, Commander in Chief of the Cinco Villas. On April 4, 1870, Federico Fernández Cavada was named Commander-in-Chief of all the Cuban forces.

Federico was captured by the Spanish gunboat "Neptuno" in 1871 and taken to Puerto Principe. There he was tried the Spanish authorities and sentenced to die by firing squad. Federico was executed in July 1871. On December 18, 1871, Adolfo Fernández Cavada was killed in battle at the coffee estate "La Adelaida" near Santiago de Cuba.

Captain Stephen Vincent Benet was promoted to the rank of Brigadier General on June 23, 1874, and named Chief of Ordnance. He authored various military related books.

Among the veterans who entered politics were Brigadier General Diego Archuleta, who was named Indian Agent by President Abraham Lincoln and later served in the Mexico Legislature. Lieutenant Colonel José Francisco Cháves, who became the first Secretary of Education for New Mexico and Lieutenant Colonel Francisco Perea who was elected as a Republican to the Thirty-eighth Congress. Perea served in said position for two years (March 4, 1863 – March 3, 1865).

One of those who resumed their life as a civilian was Colonel José Guadalupe Gallegos. Prior to the war Gallegos served in the New Mexico Territorial Legislature between 1855 and 1861. He was one of the founding members of the Historical Society of New Mexico and a founding associate in the incorporation of the New Mexican Railway Company and the New Mexico Wool Manufacturing Company. However, little is known of what he did after the war with the exception that five years later he drowned in a mysterious accident involving his horse-drawn carriage.

Captain Luis F. Emilio went into the real estate business, first in San Francisco, and later in New York. Lieutenant Augusto Rodríguez became a firefighter in New Haven, proprietor of a cigar store, a bartender and saloon keeper.

Medal of Honor recipient Corporal Joseph H. De Castro was employed by the NY Barge Office when on May 8, 1892, he died in his home at 244 West 22nd Street.

The former Confederate Colonel Santos Benavides resumed his merchant and ranching activities. He also remained active in politics.

Colonel Ambrosio José Gonzales pursued a variety of vocations, all of which were marginally successful but, like many others, he never provided the security he sought for his extended family. His efforts were similar to those of other formerly wealthy Southerners who sought to recover their estates and social status. Gonzales faced not only financial loss but also sorrows over the death of his wife and his sister-in-law's successful efforts to poison the relationships between Gonzales and his children.

Major David Camden DeLeón moved to Mexico after the war. He returned to the United States at the request of President Ulysses S. Grant and settled in New Mexico, where he practiced medicine and wrote for medical journals.

After the war, Confederate spy Loreta Janeta Velazquez a.k.a. "Lieutenant Harry Buford" wrote a Civil War memoir, about her exploits titled: "The Woman in Battle: A Narrative of the Exploits, Adventures, and Travels of Madame Loreta Janeta Velazquez, Otherwise Known as Lieutenant Harry T. Buford, Confederate States Army". She traveled in Europe as well as in the Southern United States promoting her book and ideals.

== See also ==
- Hispanic Americans in World War II
- Hispanic Admirals in the United States Navy
- Hispanics in the United States Navy
- Hispanics in the United States Coast Guard
- Hispanics in the United States Marine Corps
- Hispanics in the United States Air Force
- African Americans in the American Civil War
- German Americans in the American Civil War
- Irish Americans in the American Civil War
- Italian Americans in the Civil War
- Native Americans in the American Civil War
  - Cherokee
  - Choctaw
- Foreign enlistment in the American Civil War
- Second French intervention in Mexico
