= Italian Americans in the American Civil War =

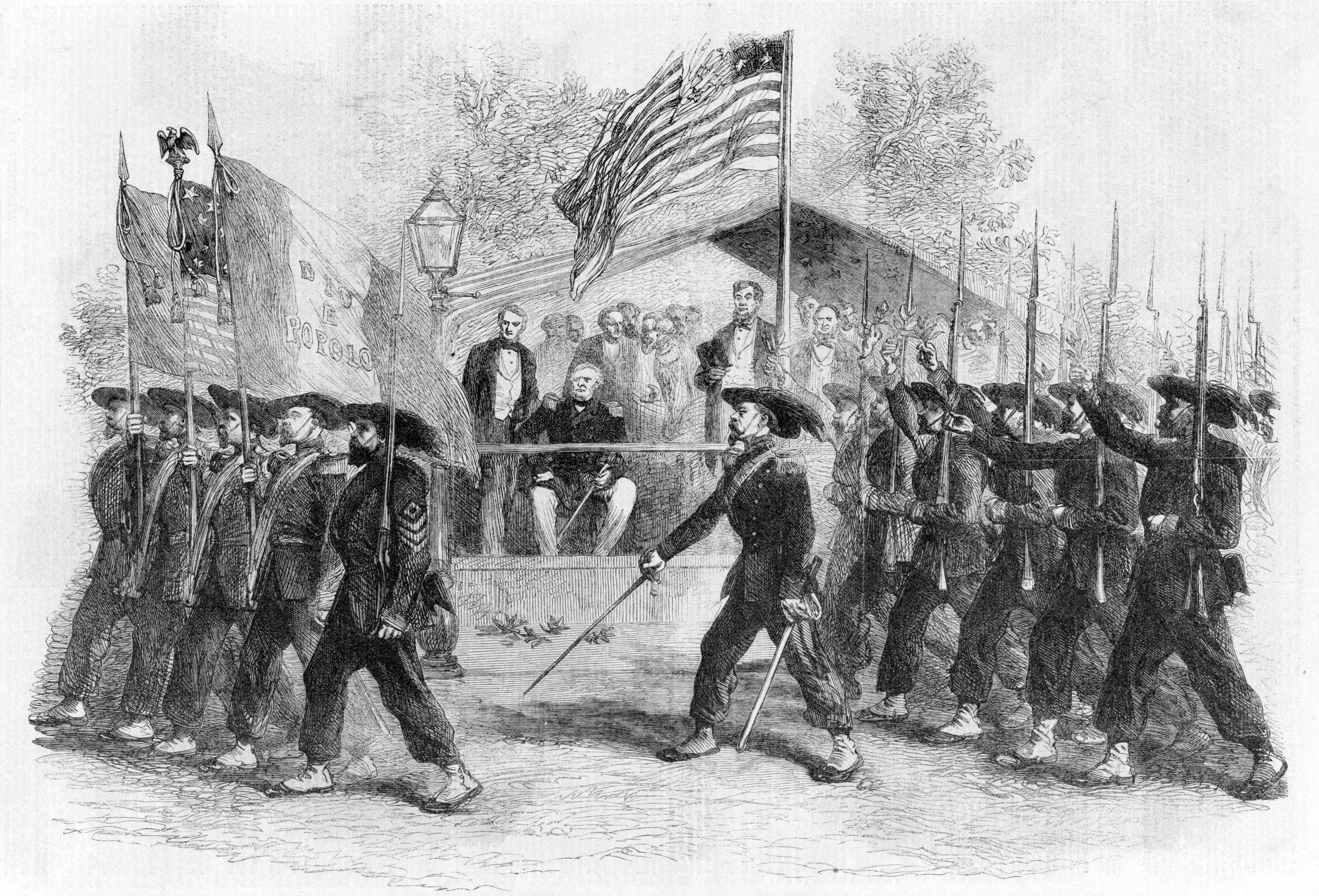
Review of the Garibaldi Guard by President Lincoln

Italian Americans in the American Civil War refers to the Italians and people of Italian descent living in the United States who served and fought in the American Civil War.

The vast majority of Italian Americans in the American Civil War fought on the side of the Union. In the newly formed Kingdom of Italy, public opinion weighed heavily in favor of the Union cause. In addition, the institution of slavery was highly unpopular in Italy. Many Italian nationalists, especially Italian republicans, directly compared their own unification struggle to that of the United States.

However, a contingent of soldiers from the former Kingdom of the Two Sicilies fought on the Confederate side, with most of these having been former prisoners of war who had fought against Giuseppe Garibaldi during his invasion of the Two Sicilies. Between 5,000 and 10,000 Italian Americans fought in the civil war.

== In the Union army ==
Shortly after the onset of war, several hundred officers and soldiers in the Italian army went to the American legation at Turin, at that time the capital of Italy, and volunteered to fight in the Union army. Because of wartime financial constraints, the U.S. Army accepted only some of these volunteers."

Most of the Italian-Americans who joined the Union Army were recruited from New York City. Many Italians of note were interested in the war and joined the army, reaching positions of authority. Brigadier General Edward Ferrero was the original commander of the 51st New York Regiment. He commanded both brigades and divisions in the eastern and western theaters of war and later commanded a division of the United States Colored Troops. Colonel Enrico Fardella, of the same and later of the 85th New York regiment, was made a brevet brigadier general when the war ended.

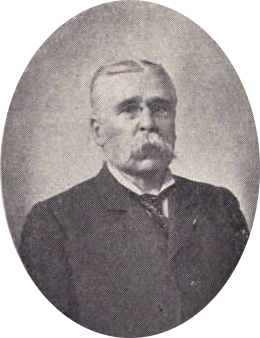
Colonel Luigi Palma di Cesnola commanded a Union cavalry unit during the war.

Francis B. Spinola recruited four regiments in New York, was soon appointed brigadier general by President Abraham Lincoln and given command of the Spinola Brigade and later the Excelsior Brigade.

Colonel Luigi Palma di Cesnola, who had served in the army of Sardinia-Piedmont during the Wars of Italian Unification and the British Army during the Crimean War, commanded the 4th New York Cavalry and would rise to become one of the highest ranking Italian officer in the Union army. He established a military school in New York City where many young Italians were trained and would later serve in the Union army. Di Cesnola received the Medal of Honor for his actions during the Battle of Aldie.

Two more famous examples were Francesco Casale and Luigi Tinelli, who were instrumental in the formation of the 39th New York Infantry Regiment. According to one evaluation of the Official Records of the Union and Confederate Armies, there were over 200 Italians who served as officers in the U.S. army.

At least 260 Italian Americans fought as sailors in the Union Navy.

=== Giuseppe Garibaldi ===
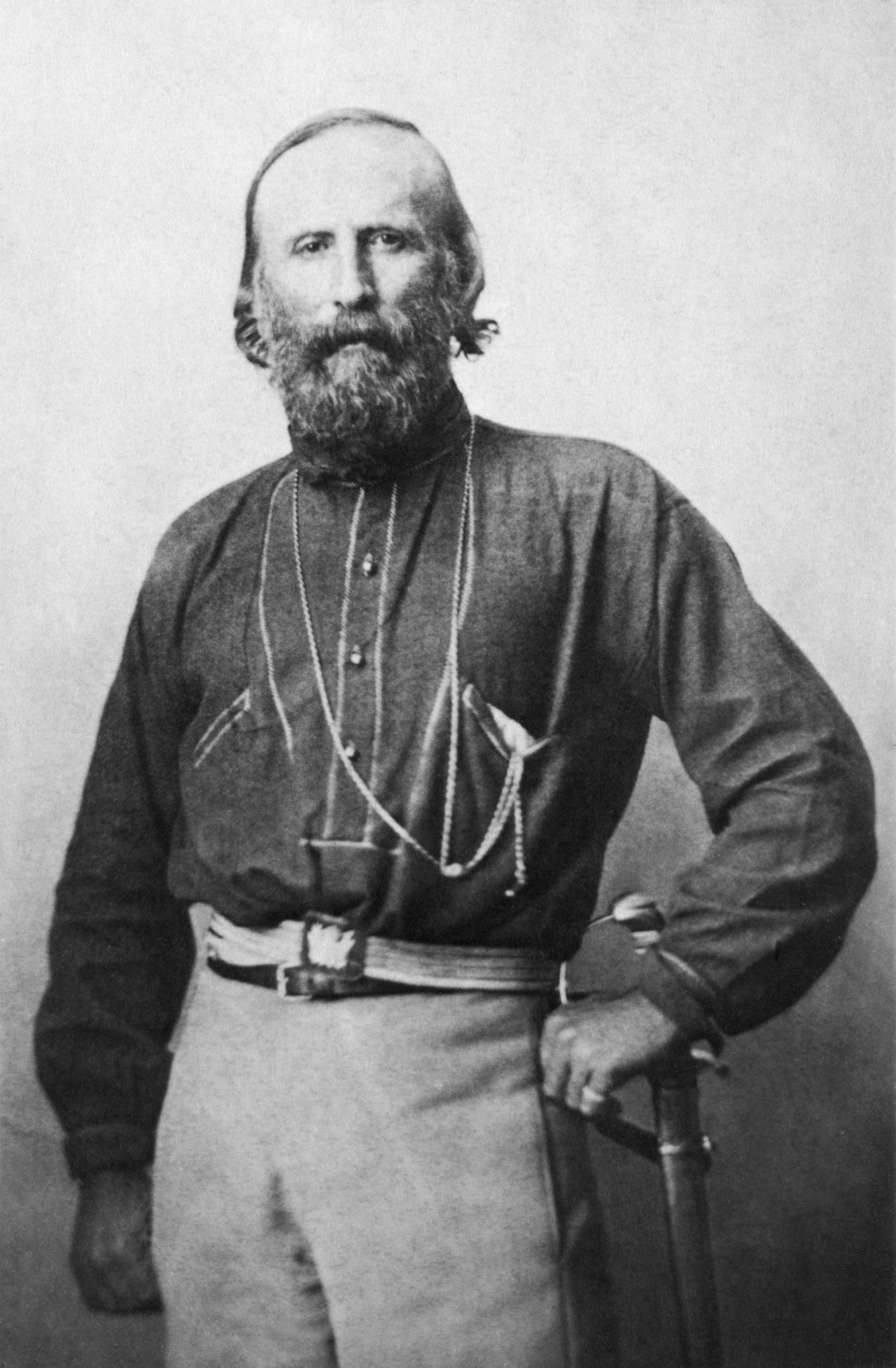
Giuseppe Garibaldi, celebrated as one of the greatest generals of modern times and as the "Hero of the Two Worlds" because of his military enterprises in South America and Europe, who fought in many military campaigns that led to Italian unification

By late 1860, Giuseppe Garibaldi had successfully concluded his Expedition of the Thousand, conquering the whole Southern Italy with what was at first an overwhelmingly outnumbered force. At the outbreak of the American Civil War in 1861, Garibaldi was a highly celebrated figure internationally and especially in the United States. The 39th New York Volunteer Infantry Regiment, of whose 350 members were Italian, was nicknamed Garibaldi Guard in his honor. The unit wore red shirts and bersaglieri plumes. They carried with them both a Union Flag as well as an Italian flag with the words Dio e popolo, meaning "God and people." In 1861, Garibaldi himself volunteered his services to President Abraham Lincoln. Garibaldi was offered a Major General's commission in the U.S. Army through the letter from Secretary of State William H. Seward to H. S. Sanford, the U.S. Minister at Brussels, July 17, 1861. On September 18, 1861, Sanford sent the following reply to Seward:

"He [Garibaldi] said that the only way in which he could render service, as he ardently desired to do, to the cause of the United States, was as Commander-in-chief of its forces, that he would only go as such, and with the additional contingent power—to be governed by events—of declaring the abolition of slavery; that he would be of little use without the first, and without the second it would appear like a civil war in which the world at large could have little interest or sympathy."

According to Italian historian Petacco, "Garibaldi was ready to accept Lincoln's 1862 offer but on one condition: that the war's objective be declared as the abolition of slavery. But at that stage Lincoln was unwilling to make such a statement lest he worsen an agricultural crisis." Although the aging Garibaldi respectfully declined Lincoln's offer, Washington D.C. recruited many of Garibaldi's former officers. On August 6, 1863, after the Emancipation Proclamation had been issued, Garibaldi wrote to Lincoln: "Posterity will call you the great emancipator, a more enviable title than any crown could be, and greater than any merely mundane treasure."

== In the Confederate army ==
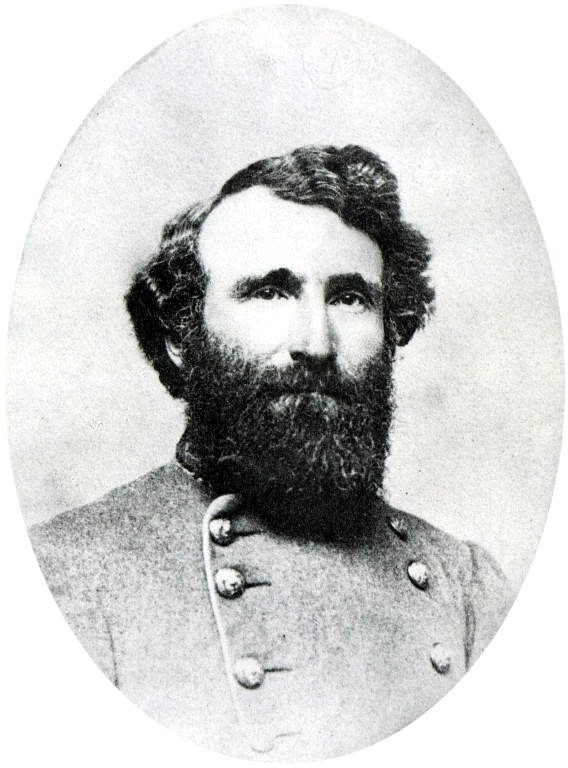
William B. Taliaferro was Confederate general in the American Civil War.

About a thousand Italians, emigrants or descendants of emigrants, or with Italian names, enlisted in the armed forces of the Confederacy.

There were Italian companies within regiments from Louisiana, Virginia, Tennessee and Alabama; as well as parts of a company from South Carolina. The military units of the South with the largest number of Italians came from Louisiana, the Confederate state with the largest presence of Italian immigrants. New Orleans, which was then the most populous city in the Confederate States, had a very high percentage of foreigners, and when the secession began, practically every ethnic group formed its own units.

The Italians already present in Louisiana attempted to form a battalion, called the "Garibaldi Legion" or, alternatively, "Garibaldi Guards": about 170 Italians volunteered.

On February 21, 1861, the "first company of the Garibaldi Guards" or simply "Garibaldi Guards" was prepared and fully equipped. On March 19, 1861, the “Garibaldi Guards” paraded through the streets of New Orleans, in uniforms that recalled the Garibaldi volunteers of Italy, red jacket and tricolor cockade.

The officers, all Italian, were: Captain Gaudenzio Marzoni (or Manzoni, both surnames predominantly Lombard), later made major and replaced by the aforementioned Captain Giuseppe (or Joseph), Santini (originally from Corsica), Second Lieutenant Ulisse Marinoni (from Brescia, political exile after the riots of 1848, in America since 1850) and Second Lieutenant Ernesto Baselli (surname predominantly Lombard).

Not having reached the number of men necessary to form an autonomous unit, the "first Garibaldi Guards company" was incorporated into the regiment of the "Cazadores Españoles-Spanish Hunters", of which it became Company F; Finally, after New Orleans fell to the Union, the Garibaldi Guards disbanded in early May 1862. Many other Italian names are found in the lists of other Confederate units. These were immigrants who had already resided in the Southern States. About a thousand Italians, emigrants or descendants of emigrants, or with Italian names, enlisted in the armed forces of the Confederacy.

Among the Confederate officer corps, General William B. Taliaferro had some Italian ancestry as a son of the Taliaferro first family of Virginia, descended from Italians in England in the 1500s who settled the Colony of Virginia in the 1600s. General P. G. T. Beauregard, a Louisiana Creole, had Italian ancestry via his mother Hélène Judith de Reggio, who hailed from a prominent first family of St. Bernard Parish, Louisiana established in 1747 by her grandfather Francesco Maria de Reggio, an Italian nobleman of the House of Este.

== See also ==
- African Americans in the American Civil War
- German Americans in the American Civil War
- Hispanics in the American Civil War
- Irish Americans in the American Civil War
- Native Americans in the American Civil War
  - Cherokee
  - Choctaw
- Foreign enlistment in the American Civil War
