= Edward Ferrero =

Union Army General (1831–1899)

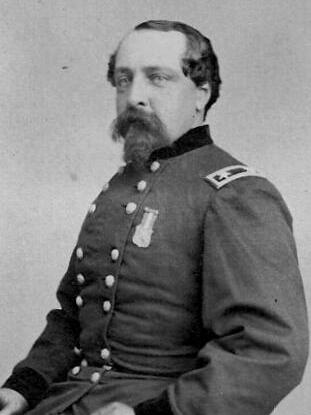
- Edward Ferrero
- Born: January 18, 1831; Granada, Spain
- Died: December 11, 1899 (aged 68); New York City, New York
- Burial place: Green-Wood Cemetery, Brooklyn, New York
- Military career
- Allegiance: United States of America; Union
- Branch: United States Army; Union Army
- Service years: 1861–1865
- Rank: Brevet Major General
- Conflicts: American Civil War; Battle of Roanoke Island; Battle of New Bern; Northern Virginia Campaign; Second Battle of Bull Run; Battle of South Mountain; Battle of Antietam; Battle of Fredericksburg; Knoxville Campaign; Battle of Fort Sanders; Siege of Petersburg; Battle of the Crater

Edward Ferrero (January 18, 1831 – December 11, 1899) was an Italian-American dance instructor, choreographer, ballroom operator and military officer who served as a general in the Union army during the American Civil War.

== Early life and career ==
Ferrero was born in Granada, Spain. His parents were natives of Italy, and had just arrived in Spain when their son was born. Thirteen months later, the family moved to the United States and settled in New York City. Ferrero's father, a noted dancer and a personal friend of the revolutionary General Giuseppe Garibaldi, soon opened a dance academy. When the elder Ferrero retired in his early fifties, Edward took over operation of the academy. He educated the wealthy and elite of New York society in the art of dance and originated many dances that spread in popularity throughout the country. Ferrero became renowned as one of America's leading experts in dance. He worked part-time as a dance instructor at the United States Military Academy and was the author of The Art of Dancing in 1859.

Ferrero was interested in military affairs from his association as a youth with Garibaldi, and from his uncle, Colonel Lewis Ferrero, who had served in the Crimean War and the Wars of Italian Unification. Edward Ferrero became and served for six years as the lieutenant colonel of the 11th New York Militia Regiment. With his skills in choreography and instruction, his troops soon became known for their parade ground precision and military drill.

== Civil War ==
With the outbreak of the Civil War in early 1861, Ferrero raised a regiment at his own expense, the 51st New York Volunteer Infantry Regiment, also known as the "Shepard Rifles". He was commissioned as its first colonel and drilled the regiment in military procedures. He led a brigade of three regiments in Maj. Gen. Ambrose Burnside's expedition to Roanoke Island, where his regiment seized the first fortified Confederate redoubt captured in the war. He also commanded a brigade at New Bern under Brig. Gen. Jesse L. Reno.

Transferred northward with his brigade to Virginia in the summer of 1862, Ferrero served in the army of Maj. Gen. John Pope during the Northern Virginia Campaign, including the Second Battle of Bull Run. In September, he served at the battles of South Mountain and Antietam, where his brigade was a part of the Union IX Corps and stormed Burnside's Bridge. For his personal bravery at Antietam, the dancer-turned-warrior was promoted to brigadier general of volunteers on September 19, 1862. (This commission expired in March 1863, but he was reappointed to rank from May 6. The latter appointment was revoked on July 21, 1864). His first action as a general was at Fredericksburg.

Sent to the Western Theater along with the IX Corps in early 1863, Ferrero led his brigade with distinction during the Siege of Vicksburg in Mississippi. He subsequently commanded a division during the Knoxville Campaign, and was in command of the defenses of Fort Sanders. Transferred eastward again in 1864 with the corps, he served in the Siege of Petersburg, commanding a division of black troops. On July 30, his men were involved in the ill-fated charge on the Crater, where they suffered significant losses supporting the initial attack of Brig. Gen. James H. Ledlie's division. Ferrero's division was supposed to take the lead in the attack, but Gen. Meade had forced the change in plans due to his distrust of the USCT. Both Ferrero and Ledlie received criticism for remaining in a shelter behind the lines throughout most of the battle, passing a bottle of rum between them. A court of inquiry headed by Maj. Gen. Winfield S. Hancock cited Ferrero for "being in a bomb-proof habitually, where he could not see the operation of his troops [nor know] the position of two brigades of his division or whether they had taken Cemetery Hill or not."

Nevertheless, on December 2, 1864, Ferrero was breveted major general for "bravery and meritorious services." He would serve throughout the Appomattox Campaign in early 1865.

== Postbellum ==
With the surrender of Robert E. Lee at Appomattox on April 19, 1865, the subsequent dissolution of the Confederate state, and the collapse of organized Confederate resistance beyond a few small holdouts in the spring and summer, military operations began winding down and the Union army began the process of demobilization. Ferrero was discharged August 24, 1865 and returned home to New York City. He chose not to reopen his previous dance academy, but instead leased a building in a new location. Ferrero would turn it into a world-famed ballroom known as Apollo Hall on 31 West 28th Street on Broadway. In 1872, he terminated his lease and the building was converted into a theater.

Ferrero leased the ballroom of Tammany Hall for his academy and joined the Tammany Society, becoming socially active in Democratic political circles, although he never ran for office. He was active in veterans affairs, including the Grand Army of the Republic and the Loyal Legion. He also joined the Freemasons. He published a second best-selling book, The History of Dancing, which remains in print today.

In January 1889, he leased the Lenox Lyceum in January 1889 and continued as one of the country's foremost dance instructors for another decade. He retired in May 1899 when he became ill with a variety of ailments that claimed his life by the end of that year.

Ferrero died in New York City and is buried in Green-Wood Cemetery, Brooklyn.

== Ferrero's books ==
- The Art of Dancing Historically Illustrated to Which is Added a Few Hints on Etiquette ISBN 1-4179-0695-2.
- The History of Dancing ISBN 1-4179-0695-2.

== See also ==
- List of American Civil War generals (Union)
- Italian Americans in the American Civil War
