= Frederick George D'Utassy =

Hungarian-born American Civil War colonel

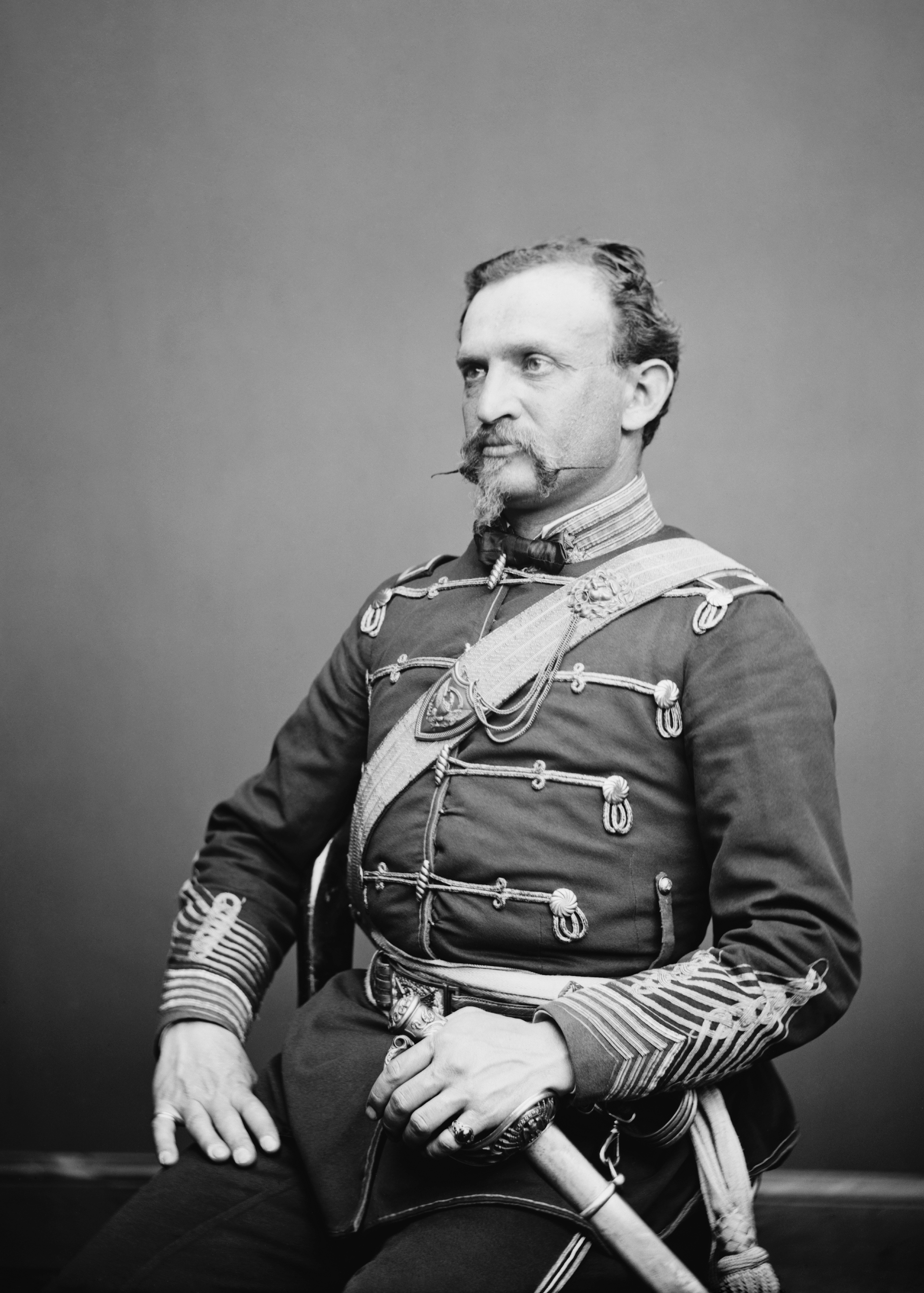
- Col. Frederick George D'Utassy
- Born: November 26, 1827; Zala Nagy Kalirsa, Hungary
- Died: May 5, 1892 (aged 64); Wilmington, Delaware
- Burial place: Loudon Park Cemetery, Baltimore, Maryland
- Military career
- Allegiance: United States of America; Union
- Branch: Union Army
- Service years: 1861–1863
- Rank: Colonel
- Commands: 39th New York Infantry
- Conflicts: American Civil War
- Other work: Soldier (Austrian Army); Instructor; Professor of Foreign Languages; Businessman

Frederick George D'Utassy or George Frederick D'Utassy (November 26, 1827 – May 5, 1892) was an officer in the Union Army in the American Civil War who led the famous Garibaldi Guard, or 39th New York Volunteer Infantry Regiment, from 1861 to 1863. The flamboyant Hungarian Colonel was court-martialed in 1863 for fraud and conduct prejudicial to military discipline.

== Antebellum life ==
Frederick George D'Utassy was born in Zala Nagy Kalirsa, Hungary on November 26, 1827. He had a shrouded past as there is no official data and his alleged early life is only on his own testimony. On his own account he served as a Lieutenant in the Austrian Army, but defected to the Hungarian revolutionaries in the Hungarian Revolution of 1848, in whose service he attained the rank of Major and was captured and sentenced to death, on which destiny he escaped to the Ottoman Empire. He traveled to Greece and Italy, and in 1855 to England and Nova Scotia. He allegedly worked as a cavalry instructor, a secretary and a dancing teacher. He was appointed a professor of foreign languages at Dalhousie College in Halifax in 1855, as he spoke (at least) English, Hungarian, German, Spanish, French, and Italian. In October 1860 he moved to New York City. D'Utassy was married to his wife Bertha, with whom he had a son named Leo L. D'Utassy (born in 1854). Accompanying them to New York were his mother, his sister and his two brothers Anton and Carl. There D'Utassy started to introduce himself into the city's higher society.

== American Civil War service ==
D'Utassy helped to raise and organise the 39th New York Volunteer Infantry Regiment, a unit that was mustered in New York City for a service period of three years on May 22, 1861. Initially divided into 11 companies of men from Germany, Hungary, Switzerland, Italy, France, Spain and Portugal, it would ultimately host 11 different nationalities. His brothers Carl (on the muster rolls as Carl von Utassy) and Anton also joined the regiment as Lieutenants (Anton Anthony D'Utassy rose to Captain during the war). On May 27, 1861, they deployed to Washington and in July the 39th participated in the movement of the army towards Manassas. Attached into the 1st Brigade (Col. Louis Blenker) of the 5th Division (Col. Dixon S. Miles) it was only slightly engaged at the First Battle of Bull Run. Stationed in Alexandria, the ill feelings of the multi-ethnic regiment turned into violence and sparked several mutinies - all of those were quelled in D'Utassy's presence. In August, when Blenker was elevated to command of the German Division, D'Utassy took temporary command of the brigade. D'Utassy tried to Americanize his regiment, going so far as refusing to accept orders written in German, trying to use English as the only language used in the regiment and ordering his officer to pass language examinations. D'Utassy was a strong and hot-tempered disciplinarian and initiated severe punishment and several courts-martial for drunkenness or misconduct. He was utterly despised by a great portion of the regiment's officer corps, so much that many officers resigned. At the same time rumors were spread that D'Utassy was an impostor who forged his military records, and in reality an Austrian Jew by the name of Frederick Strasser; but he never officially denounced them. His hatred of all German, a common sentiment in the Hungarian revolutionaries, infuriated both his German superiors and his regiment as about half of the regiment was German. In November the quarrelsome Colonel reverted to command his regiment, and brigade command was given to Julius Stahel, who was junior to D'Utassy and has been promoted to Colonel just few weeks before. At the same time D'Utassy was accused of fraudulently drawing additional rations, but he proved the correctness of his action and the charge was neutralized. In April the feud between D'Utassy and Blenker, that was used under heavy use of the media, culminated in D'Utassy being arrested. D'Utassy demanded a court-martial, but this was denied.

At the same time the division was assigned from Sumner's II Corps to Maj. Gen. John C. Frémont's Mountain Department and joined his forces on May 11, taking part in the engagement near Strasburg. In the Battle of Cross Keys the brigade, still under now Brig. Gen. Stahel, and the 39th New York were stationed on the far left. It made an attack against the Confederate lines of Gen. Isaac R. Trimble, but was repulsed with heavy losses. Its further retreat marked the defeat of the Union Army on this day. On June 26 the 39th New York was assigned to Brig. Gen. Julius White's Railroad Brigade in the VIII Corps of the Washington defences. The brigade consisted of the 39th, 111th and 115th New York Infantry regiments, as well as the 15th Indiana Battery. During July and August it encamped at Middletown, Virginia; and D'Utassy, now free from the ethnical struggles with his commanders, managed to get the appreciation and admiration of his fellow American officers. The brigade took part in the retreat to Harper's Ferry in September 1862. General White officially accepted to serve under command of Colonel Dixon S. Miles, and took position as commander of the line at Bolivar Heights. This put D'Utassy in command of the brigade. D'Utassy took part in the surrender on September 15, though he reportedly strongly advised against it.

After he was paroled he and the brigade proceeded to Camp Douglas, Chicago. He, like Gen. White and the other brigade commanders, was arrested by order of the Adjutant-General and had to testify on the court-martial about the conduct at Harper's Ferry under presidency of Gen. David Hunter. D'Utassy, like Gen. White and the brigade, was acquitted of any fault; and instead received praise. They officially exchanged in November and returned to Washington, when Colonel D'Utassy was assigned to command the 1st Brigade of the provisional division of Maj. Gen. Silas Casey at Union Mills, Maryland. The brigade, later named 3rd Brigade, was made up of depleted units from Harper's Ferry and consisted again of the 39th and the 115th as well as of the 126th New York Infantry and 125th New York Infantry regiments. While the 115th left the brigade it was later rejoined by the 111th New York. For a short time the 26th Michigan Infantry was attached to the brigade, as was the 151st Pennsylvania Infantry till February 1863. In December he and his brigade took part in opposing Stuart's Christmas Raid, but did not engage the Confederate raiders. In January, 1863, the brigade command was given to convalescent Brigadier Alexander Hays and D'Utassy again reverted to command his 39th New York, though Hays utilized him as his deputy.

== The Court-Martial ==
In March 1863 Colonel D'Utassy was arrested by order of the War Department. A court-martial convened on April 2 under presidency of Maj. Gen. Ethan A. Hitchcock, and D'Utassy was accused of 3 charges with 25 individual specifications - on which he pleaded not guilty. The whole matter was part of a campaign to exterminate corruption, fraud and mismanagement from the army, a campaign that hit first on many units and officers from the former German Division. Taking nearly 2 months, a great number of witnesses testified on the accusations and the conduct of the Colonel. Many officers, like Generals Fremont, White and Hays and colleagues like Brig. Gen. George J. Stannard of Vermont (who also was at Harper's Ferry) and Col. George L. Willard of the 125th New York, testified most positively on his conduct and efficiency; and several officers and enlisted men from his regiment concurred with this view. Nonetheless the prosecution witnesses like the regiment's Lieutenant Colonel Alexander Repetti (who was accused by D'Utassy and others in response) and several officers and men testified against him and confirmed the charges and accusations. On May 27 the verdict was sentenced and directly approved by President Abraham Lincoln. While he was found not guilty on the charge of "Advising and persuading a soldier to desert" he was found guilty of "Unlawfully selling and disposing of Government horses for his own benefit" in two out of three specifications. More importantly, he was found guilty of "Conduct prejudicial to good order and military discipline" by unlawfully opening post, selling the position of Major in his regiment to a fellow officer, forging muster rolls, and forging accounts to fraudulently receive several thousand dollars. D'Utassy was sentenced:

To forfeit all pay and allowances now due and that may become due to him;

To be cashiered; To be confined at hard labor for the period of one year at such place
as the Secretary of War shall direct; To be disqualified from holding any office of trust
honor, or employment in the service of the United States, and the crime, name, and
punishment of the delinquent to be published in at least three of the public papers
of the State of New York.

— Ethan A. Hitchcock, General Orders of the War Department, embracing the years 1861, 1862 & 1863, Vol. 2, 1864, General Orders #159

== Postbellum life ==
With this verdict he was discharged from the United States Volunteers on May 29, 1863. While newspapers like the New York Times (that was related to the regiment from its first hour) were generally portraying him in a good light, others, like the New York Tribune, did not and used his case as prejudiced verdict against immigrants. The place where he was to be confined was the famous Sing Sing Prison in Ossining, New York. Arriving at the prison with a great media presence it is alleged that, when asking for a better treatment, he told a guard, "I speak twelve languages!" to which the guard dryly replied, "Here in Sing-Sing we only speak one and we want very little of that." After his release, Frederick D'Utassy was the owner of a portrait studio, and later worked as an insurance agent and importer with some success. He reportedly was a 33rd degree Freemason. Living in New York City for many years, he later moved to Baltimore, Maryland. On May 5, 1892, he was found unconscious in his gas filled hotel room in Wilmington, Delaware. D'Utassy was brought to a nearby hospital where he died later in the day in the presence of his siblings. He was buried at Loudon Park Cemetery in Baltimore, and was outlived by his widow and son. He also was the namesake of his brother Anton's son, George D'Utassy.
