= Savage 1861 Navy =

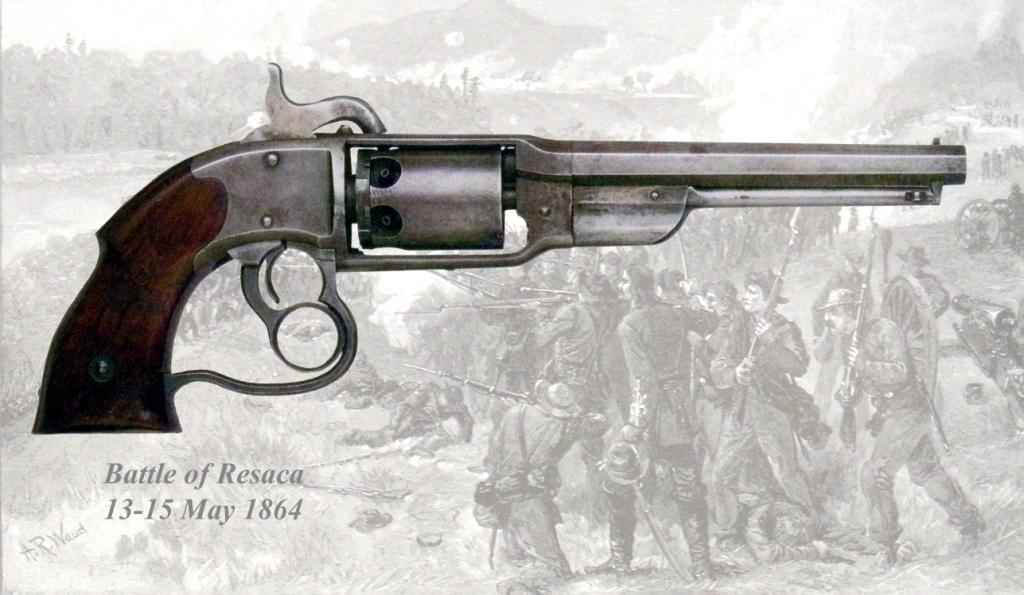
- Type: Revolver
- Place of origin: United States

Service history
- In service: 1861-1865
- Used by: United States, Confederate States
- Wars: American Civil War

Production history
- Designer: Savage Revolving Firearms Company
- Designed: 1860
- Produced: 1861-1862
- No. built: 20,000

Specifications
- Mass: 3 pounds, 6 ounces
- Length: 14-1/2"
- Cartridge: .36 Ball
- Caliber: .36
- Action: double-action
- Feed system: 6-shot Cylinder

The Savage 1861 Navy was a cap and ball revolver manufactured by the Savage Revolving Firearms Company from 1861 to 1862. This company is unrelated to the later Savage Arms Company. It was used by both sides during the American Civil War.

== Design ==
The Savage 1861 Navy is quite unique in appearance and is only comparable to its predecessor, the Savage 1859 Figure Eight. Both guns are recognized by its use of a kind of "proto double-action" with a second trigger underneath the first. When this trigger is pulled it rotates the cylinder and cocks the hammer.

== History ==
Designed in 1860 by Henry S. North and Edward Savage, production began in Middletown, Connecticut in 1861 and ended in 1862 with a total of 20,000 units produced. An initial order of 5,500 units was placed in 1861 but was later extended to 12,000 units. The first units were delivered late 1861. The remaining units were sold to civilians and several ended up being used by the Confederates.

== Use during the American Civil War ==
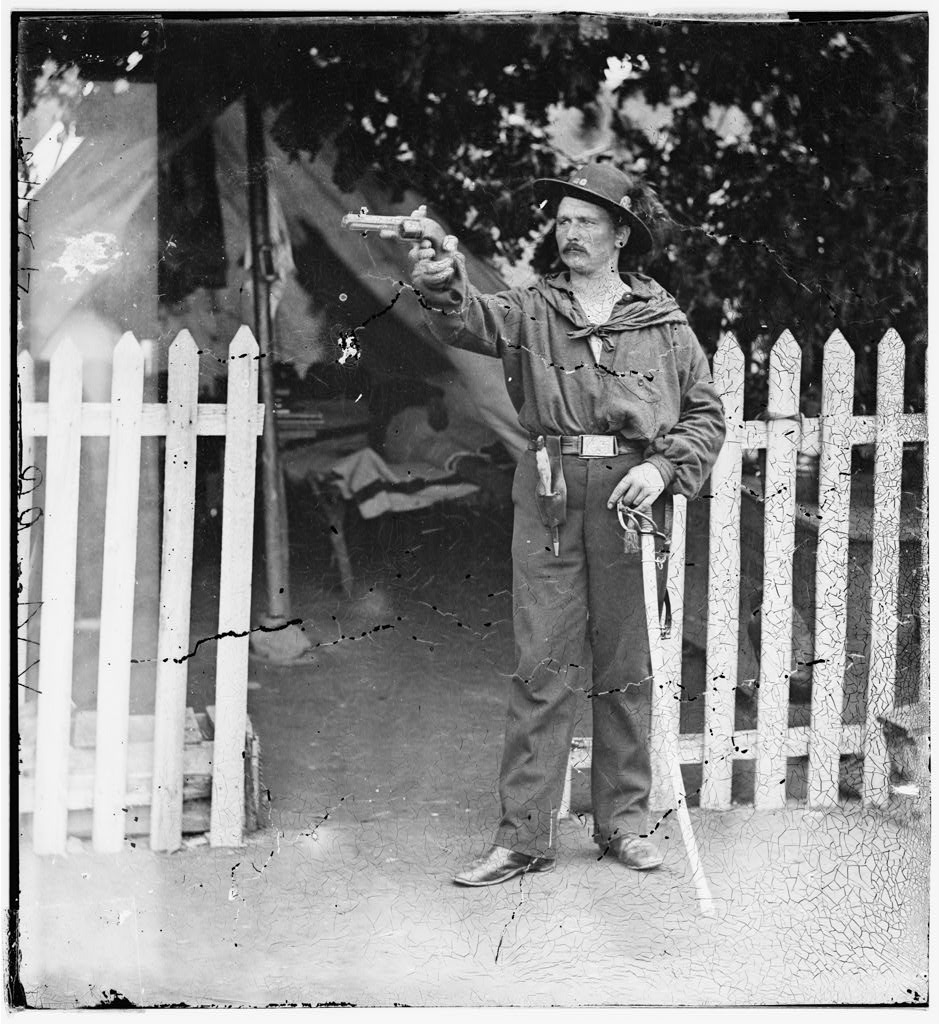
"Captain Schwartz the Sharpshooter" holding what is possibly a Savage 1861 Navy revolver. A cropped version Appears in Francis Miller's "The Photographic History of the Civil War" Vol 5 "Forts and Artillery" .p.125, this officer was a Lt. Col. in the 39th New York Infantry.

During the American Civil War the Savage 1861 Navy was officially used by the following United States army regiments: 1st Wisconsin U.S. Volunteer Cavalry, 2nd Wisconsin U.S. Volunteer Cavalry, 5th Kansas Volunteer Cavalry, and the 7th New York Cavalry.

Confederate States Army regiments: 34th Battalion of Virginia Cavalry, 35th Battalion of Virginia Cavalry, 11th Texas Cavalry, 7th Virginia Cavalry and the 7th Missouri Cavalry.

The United States Navy also used the revolver in small numbers, but it was never widely adopted due to a lack of consistency and low-quality production material/machines. This amounted to a pistol that was more of a concept, being one of the only double-triggered pistols in existence. The Savage Navy just could not compare to other models like the Colt Army 1860, and quickly became a high-demand collector's item over an army pistol.

== Post war use ==
Even though the gun was offered to the soldiers when the war ended, only 17 units were reported being bought.
