= Hispanics in the United States Navy =

Aspect of US Navy history

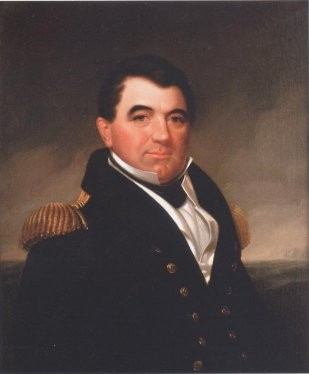
George Farragut

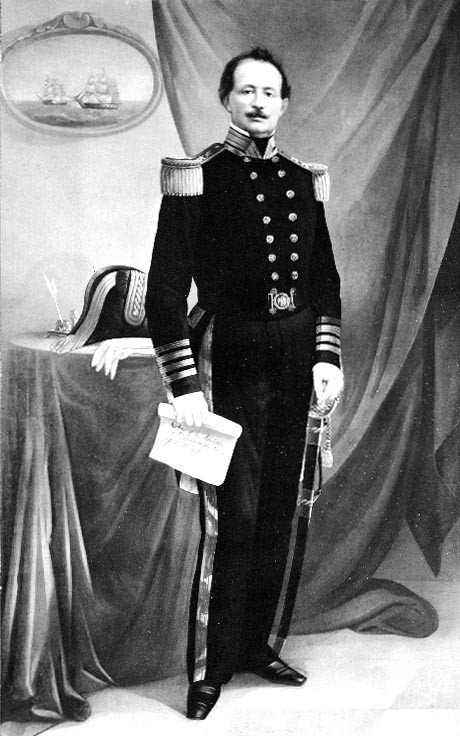
Uriah Phillips Levy

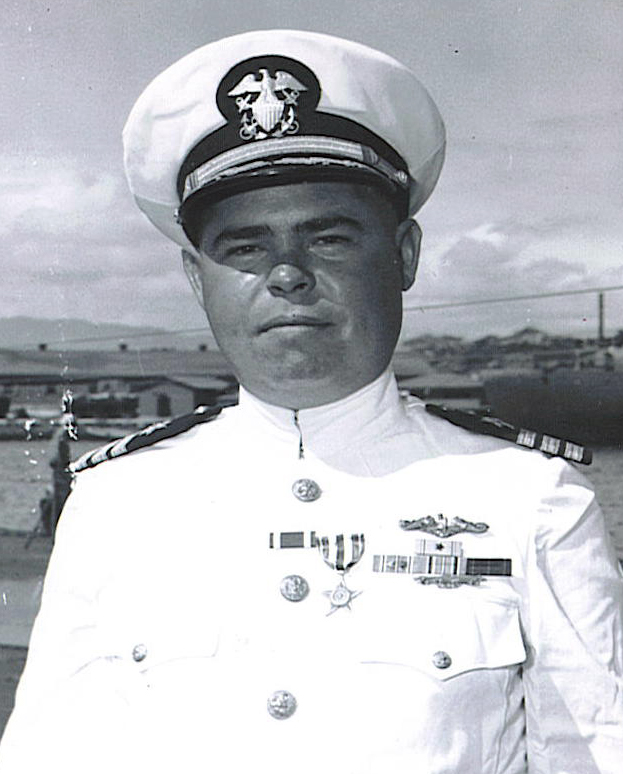
Marion Frederic Ramírez de Arellano

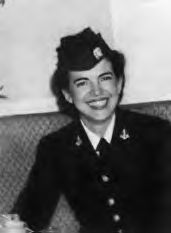
Maria Rodriguez Denton

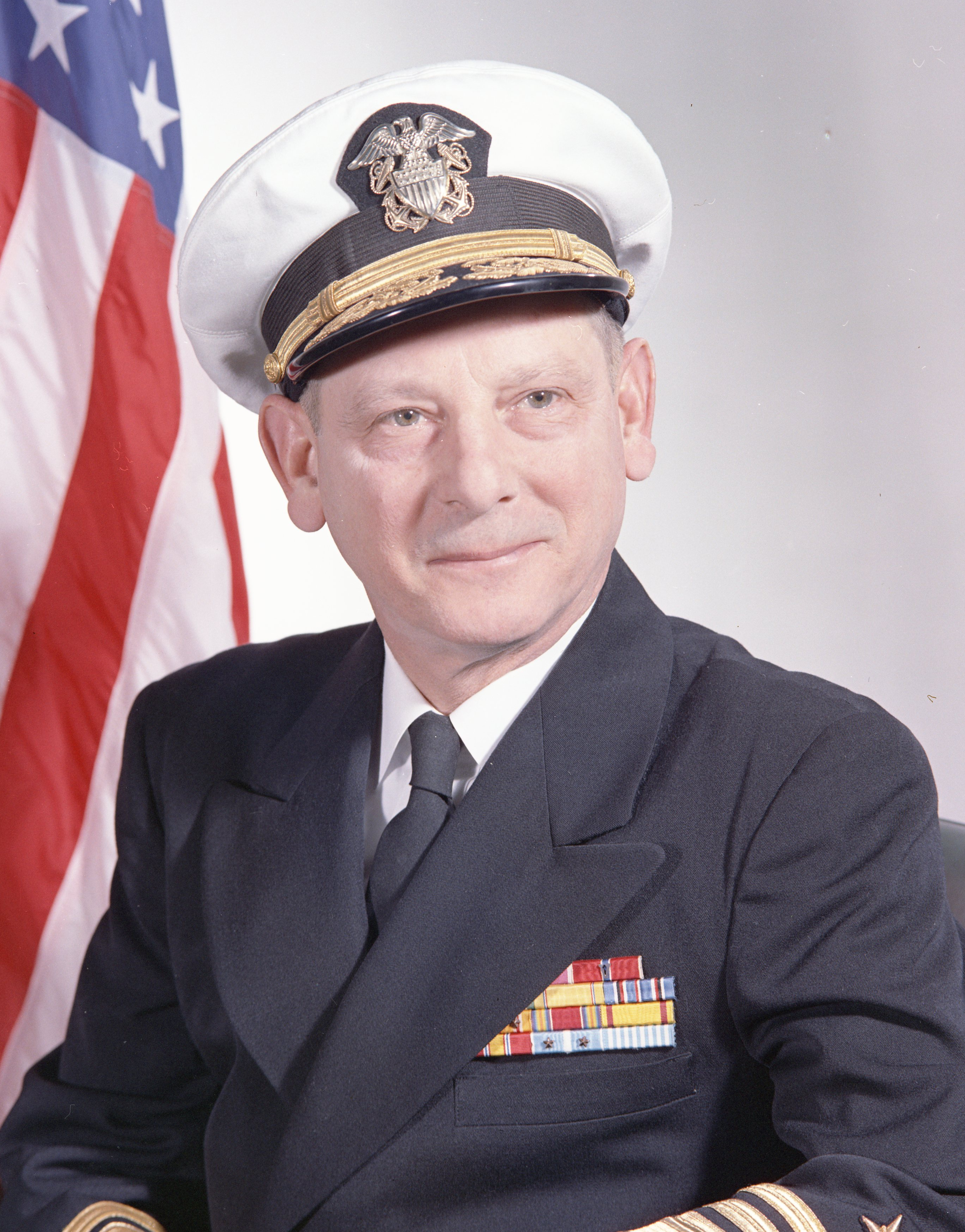
Horacio Rivero, Jr.

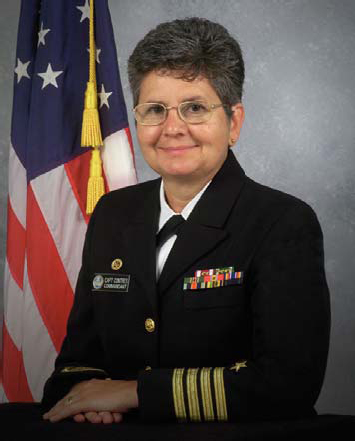
Kathlene Contres

Hispanics in the United States Navy can trace their tradition of naval military service to men such as Lieutenant Jordi Farragut Mesquida, who served in the American Revolution. Hispanics, such as Seaman Philip Bazaar and Seaman John Ortega, have distinguished themselves in combat and have been awarded the Medal of Honor, the highest military decoration of the United States. Hispanics have also reached the top ranks of the navy, serving their country in sensitive leadership positions on domestic and foreign shores. Among those who have reached the highest ranks in the navy are Commodore Uriah Phillips Levy, of Sephardic and Ashkenazic Jewish descent, who participated in the War of 1812 as an assistant Sailing master; Admiral David Glasgow Farragut, for whom the rank of admiral in the U.S. Navy was created during the American Civil War; and Admiral Horacio Rivero, who led the navy during the Cuban Missile Crisis.

Hispanic is an ethnic term employed to categorize any citizen or resident of the United States, of any racial background, of any country, and of any religion, who has at least one ancestor from the people of Spain or is of non-Hispanic origin, but has an ancestor from Mexico, Puerto Rico, Cuba, Central or South America, or some other Hispanic origin. The three largest Hispanic groups in the United States are the Mexican-Americans, Puerto Ricans, and Cubans.

According to the U.S. Census Bureau the estimated Hispanic population of the United States is over 50 million, or 16% of the U.S. population, and Hispanics are the nation's largest ethnic or racial minority. The 2010 U.S. Census estimate of over 50 million Hispanics in the U.S. does not include the 3.9 million residents of Puerto Rico.

More than 43,000 people of Hispanic origin are sailors and civilians serving with the U.S. Navy.

The United States Navy has implemented aggressive recruitment programs directed towards this group. One of those programs is El Navy, whose principal aim is to attract those who speak Spanish. It has resulted in increased recruitment of Hispanics for entrance to the United States Naval Academy. As of April 2007, thirteen Hispanic Americans who were graduates of the USNA, and nine who were commissioned after attending the navy's officer candidate school, have reached the rank of rear admiral and above.

== American Revolution and the War of 1812 ==
The United States Navy traces its origins to the Continental Navy, which was established during the American Revolutionary War and was disbanded shortly thereafter. The United States Constitution provided the legal basis for a seaborne military force by giving Congress the power "to provide and maintain a navy." Attacks against American shipping by Barbary Coast corsairs spurred Congress to employ this power by passing the Naval Act of 1794 ordering the construction and manning of six frigates.

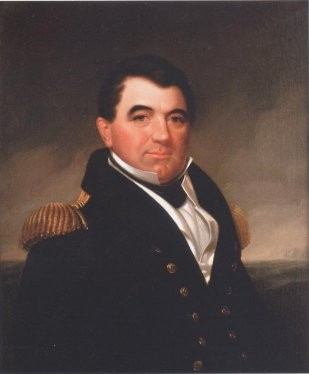
Lieutenant Jordi Farragut Mesquida

Lieutenant Jordi Farragut Mesquida, (1755–1817) was a Spanish–Catalan by descent and a Minorquin by birth. He immigrated to the American colonies and participated in the American Revolution as a lieutenant in the South Carolina Navy. During the Revolution, he fought the British at Savannah, Georgia, and in 1780 was captured during the battle of Charleston, South Carolina. He was released in a prisoner exchange and volunteered in the militia which fought at the Battle of Cowpens and Wilmington, North Carolina. Farragut Mesquida married Elizabeth Shine and had two sons, one of them was David Farragut.

Commodore Uriah Phillips Levy (1792–1862), a Sephardic Jew whose ancestors were from Portugal, born in Philadelphia, Pennsylvania. He was the great-great-grandson of Dr. Samuel Nunez, the leader of the first Jewish colonists who helped found Savannah, Georgia. Levy was assigned sailing master on USS Argus, which interdicted English ships in the English Channel during the War of 1812. The ship confiscated more than twenty vessels, but was captured in 1813 and Levy and rest of the crew were taken prisoner until the end of the war.

Upon his return to the United States, Levy served as the sailing master on the 74-gun ship USS Franklin and in 1817 was promoted to the rank of Lieutenant. He was promoted to the rank of master commandant in 1837, and the rank of captain in 1844. In 1855, Levy was given the courtesy title of commodore, in recognition of his superior abilities, making him one of the navy's highest-ranking officers and the first Sephardic Jew of Hispanic descent to reach the rank, which at the time was the highest rank in the U.S. Navy.

== American Civil War ==
=== Union Navy ===
During the American Civil War, the government of the United States recognized that the rapidly expanding Union Navy was in need of admirals. Therefore, on July 16, 1862 Congress proceeded to authorize the appointment of nine officers to the rank of rear admiral, making Flag Officer David Glasgow Farragut the first Hispanic-American to be appointed said grade.

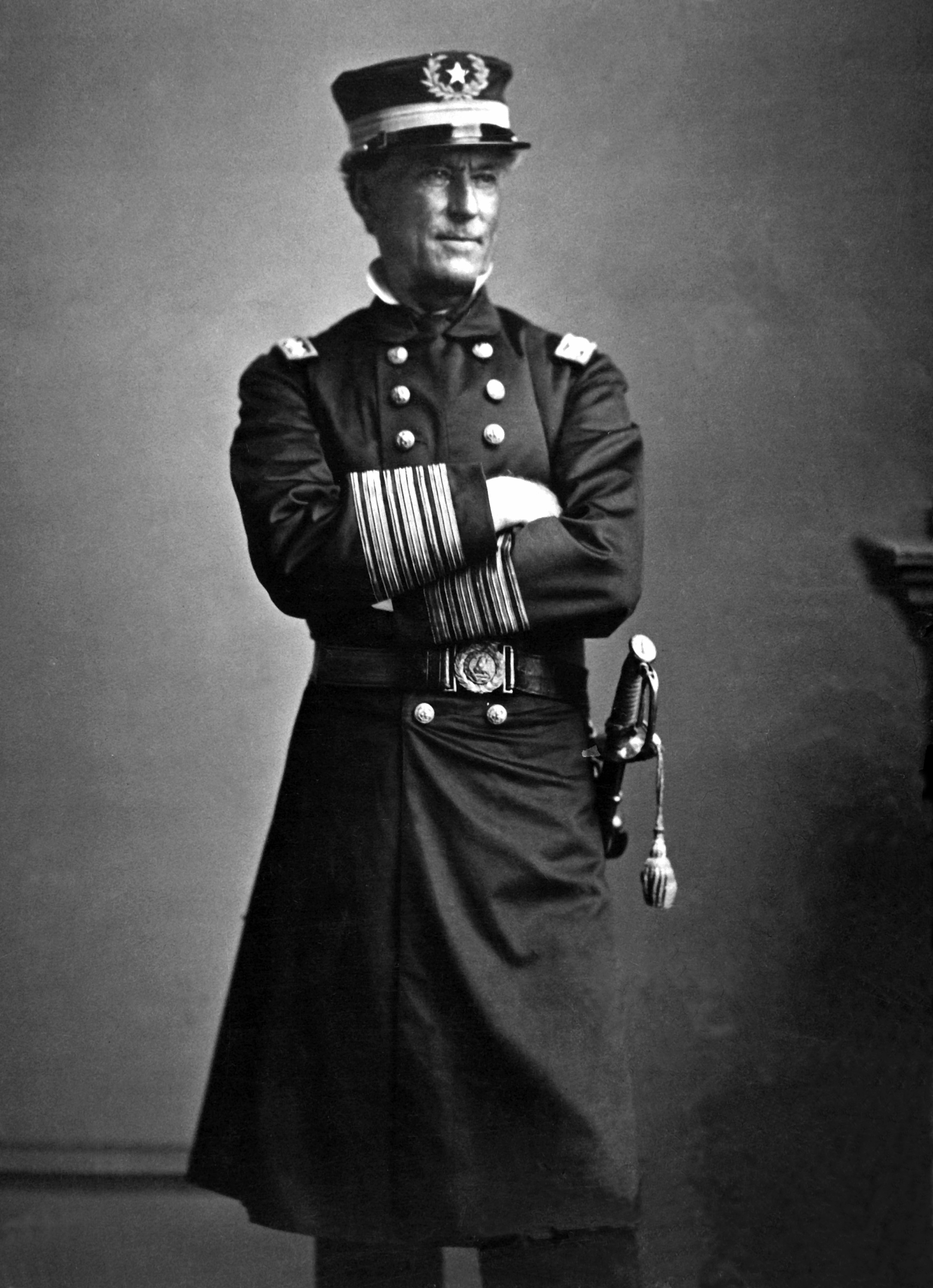
Admiral David Farragut

David Glasgow Farragut (1801–1870) was born on at Campbell's Station, near Knoxville, Tennessee, to Jordi and Elizabeth Farragut. After Farragut's mother died from yellow fever in his 1808, his father gave him up for adoption, and he was adopted by future-U.S. Navy Captain David Porter.

On December 17, 1810, Farragut entered the navy as a midshipman aboard USS Essex. He was 12 years old when, during the War of 1812, he was given the assignment to bring a ship captured by USS Essex, safely to port.

In April 1862, Farragut was the "flag officer" in command of the West Gulf Blockading Squadron. With his flagship, USS Hartford, he ran past Fort Jackson and Fort St. Philip and the Chalmette, Louisiana, batteries to take the city and port of New Orleans, Louisiana. This victory was an influential factor when in 1862, Congress created the rank of admiral and named Farragut and eight other naval officers (which also included his foster brother David Dixon Porter) as rear admirals. Thus, Farragut became the first Hispanic-American admiral in the United States Navy.

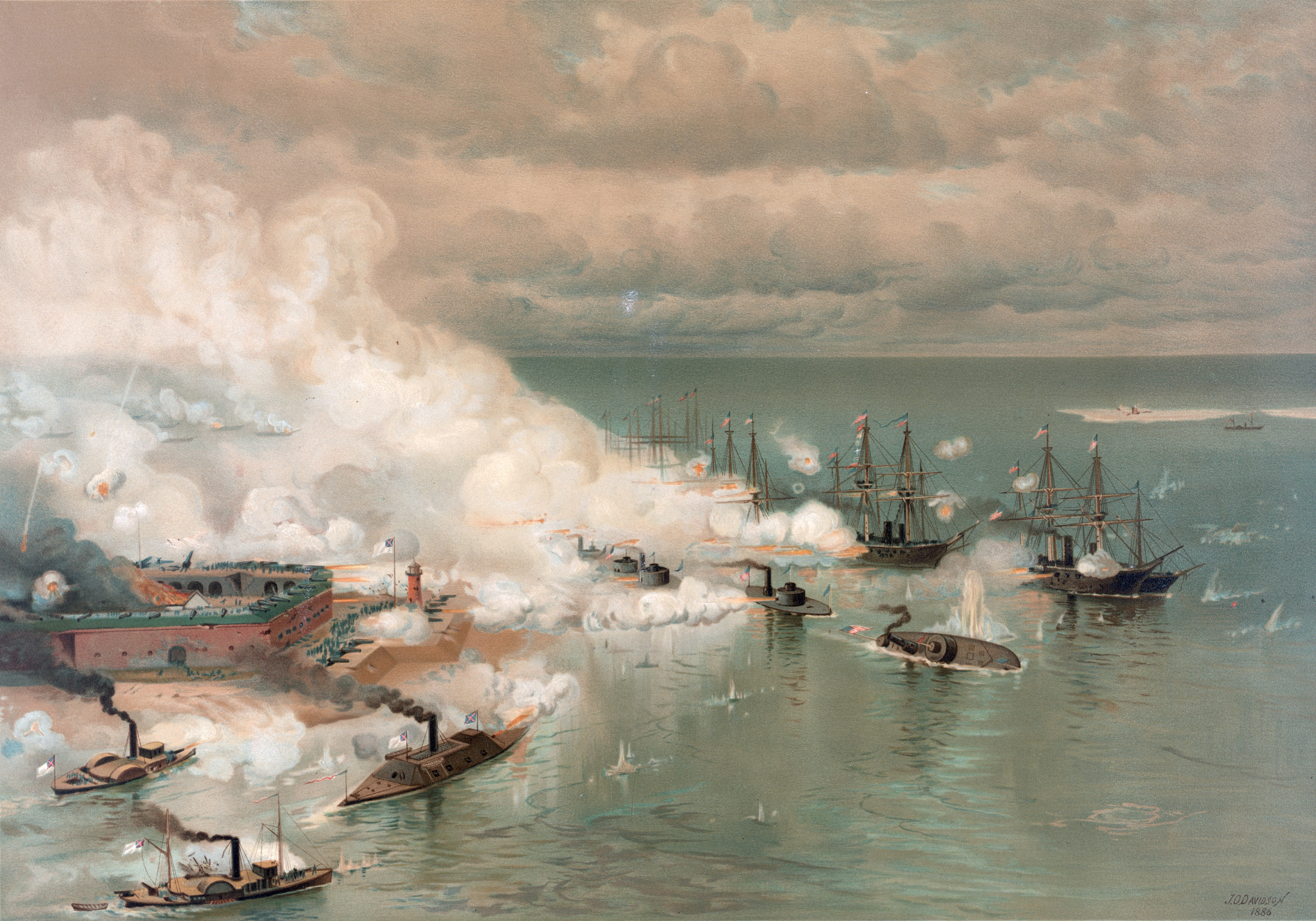
Battle of Mobile Bay by Louis Prang.

Farragut's greatest victory was the Battle of Mobile Bay on August 5, 1864. Mobile, Alabama, at the time was the Confederacy's last major port open on the Gulf of Mexico. The bay was heavily mined with tethered naval mines, also known as torpedoes.

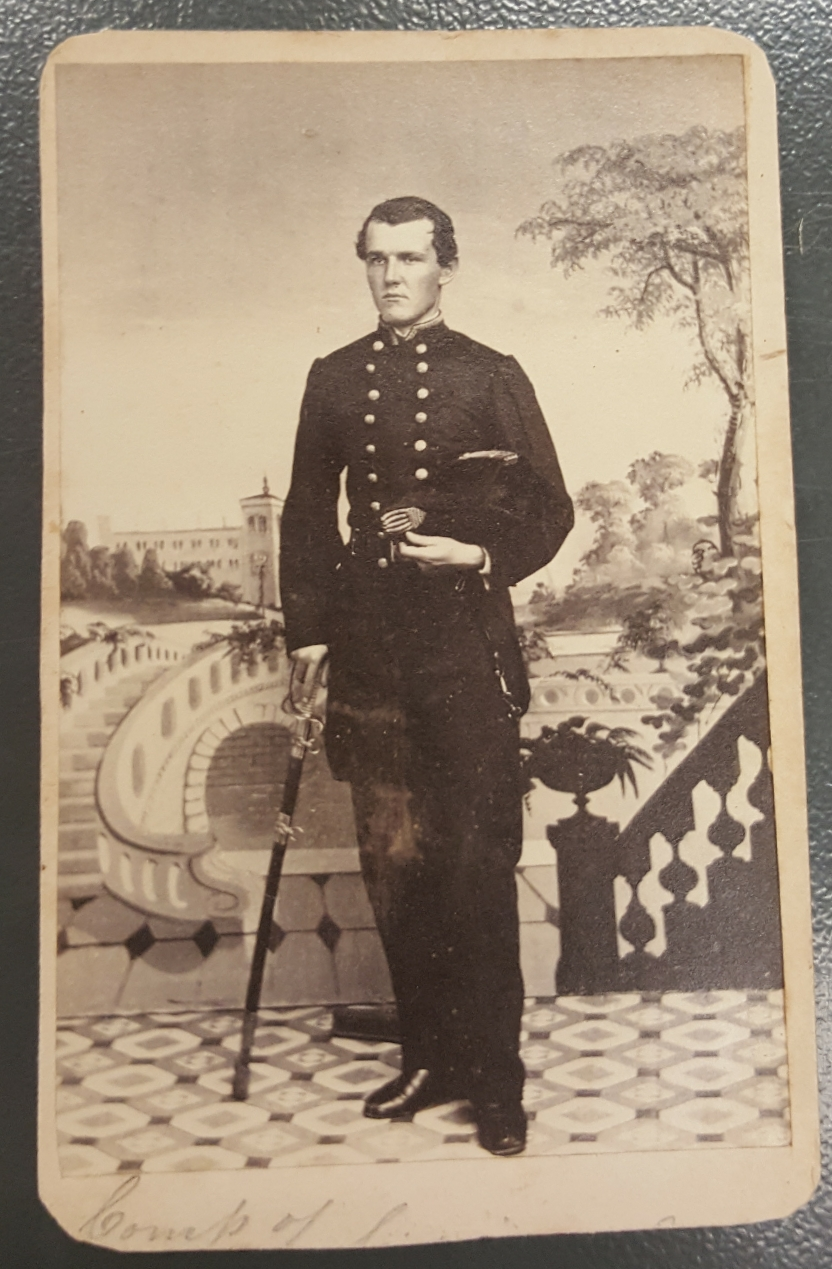
Cipriano Andrade (retired in 1901 with the rank of rear admiral)

When USS Tecumseh, one of the ships under his command, struck a mine and went down, Farragut shouted through a trumpet from his flagship to USS Brooklyn, "What's the trouble?" "Torpedoes!" was the reply, to which Farragut then shouted his now famous words "Damn the torpedoes! Full speed ahead!" The fleet succeeded in entering the bay. Farragut then triumphed over the opposition of heavy batteries in Fort Morgan and Fort Gaines to defeat the squadron of Admiral Franklin Buchanan. Farragut was promoted to vice admiral on December 21, 1864, and to full admiral on July 25, 1866, after the war, thereby becoming the first person to be named full admiral in the navy's history.

Third Assistant Engineer Cipriano Andrade (1840–1911) was born in Tampico, Mexico. He joined the Union Navy in 1861, and served on board USS Lancaster. During the Civil War, Andrade served on board USS Lancaster (1861–1863); and USS Pontiac (1863–1865) as a Third Assistant Engineer. His position was the most junior marine engineer of the ship. responsible for electrical, sewage treatment (resulting in the pejorative pun "turd engineer"), lube oil, bilge, and oily water separation systems. Depending on usage. and his position sometimes required that he assist the third mate in maintaining proper operation of the lifeboats. On July 1, 1901, he was transferred to the retired list of the navy with the rank of rear admiral.

=== Medal of Honor ===
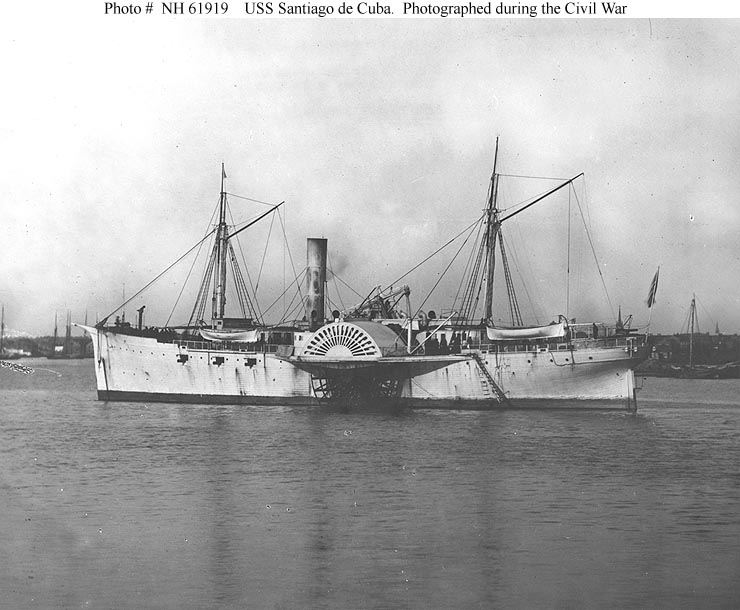
USS Santiago de Cuba

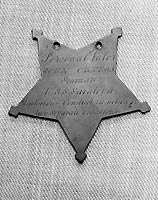
Reverse of the Medal of Honor awarded to Seaman John Ortega

The Medal of Honor is the highest military decoration awarded by the United States government. It is bestowed on a member of the United States armed forces who distinguishes himself "...conspicuously by gallantry and intrepidity at the risk of his life above and beyond the call of duty while engaged in an action against an enemy of the United States.

Seaman John Ortega (born in 1840 in Spain), was a resident of Pennsylvania who joined the Union Navy in his adopted hometown in Pennsylvania. Ortega was assigned to USS Saratoga during the Civil War. USS Saratoga was ordered to proceed to Charleston, South Carolina, for duty in the South Atlantic Blockading Squadron. Ortega was a member of the landing parties from the ship who made several raids in August and September 1864, which resulted in the capture of many prisoners and the taking or destruction of substantial quantities of ordnance, ammunition, and supplies. A number of buildings, bridges, and salt works were destroyed during the expedition. For his actions Seaman John Ortega was awarded the Medal of Honor and promoted to acting master's mate.

Seaman Philip Bazaar, born in Chile, South America, was a resident of Massachusetts, who joined the Union Navy at New Bedford. He was assigned to USS Santiago de Cuba, a wooden, brigantine-rigged, side-wheel steamship under the command of Rear Admiral David D. Porter. In the latter part of 1864, Union General Ulysses S. Grant ordered an assault on Fort Fisher, a Confederate stronghold. The stronghold protected the vital trading routes of Wilmington's port, in North Carolina. On January 12, 1865, both ground and naval Union forces attempted a second land assault, after the failure of the first. During the land assault, Bazaar and five other crew members carried dispatches from Rear Admiral Porter to Major General Alfred Terry, while under heavy fire from the Confederates to Major General Alfred Terry. Bazaar was awarded the Medal of Honor for his actions.

=== Confederate States Navy ===
Hispanics also fought for the Confederate States Navy. One such case was Captain Michael Philip Usina (1840–1903). Usina was born in St. Augustine, Florida, to Spanish parents. As captain of several blockade runners, Usina managed to avoid capture on his many successful missions. Usina fought in Co. B in the 8th Georgia Infantry of the Confederate Army before being transferred to the navy. He was wounded and captured in the Battle of Manassas, but managed to escape and reach the Southern lines.

== World War I ==
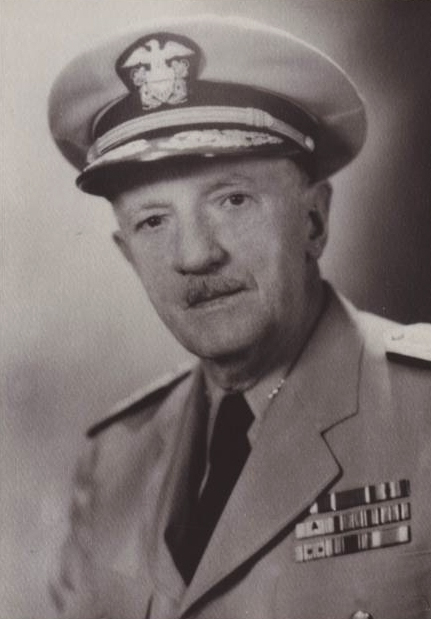
RADM Frederick Lois Riefkohl

On April 6, 1917, the U.S. Congress declared war on Germany and officially entered World War I. At the time, soldiers and sailors with Spanish surnames or Spanish accents were sometimes the objects of ridicule and relegated to menial jobs. However, Hispanics continued to join the military and serve their nation.

Captain Robert F. Lopez retired from the navy in 1911. During World War I, he was recalled to active duty and given the rank of commodore (equivalent to a one-star admiral rank, typically used during wartime) to command the Mare Island Naval Shipyard.

Luis de Florez graduated from the Massachusetts Institute of Technology (MIT) in 1911 before joining the navy. During World War I he became a naval aviator. Commander de Flores is credited with numerous inventions which made better flight simulators and equipment for flight safety.

Lieutenant Frederick Lois Riefkohl (1889–1969), a native of Maunabo, Puerto Rico, became the first Puerto Rican to graduate from the USNA, and served as commander of the armed guard of USS Philadelphia. On August 2, 1917, after engaging an enemy submarine, he was awarded the Navy Cross, the second highest medal that can be awarded by the U.S. Navy.

George E. Fernandez, a water tender (a first-class petty officer in charge in a fireroom) aboard the destroyer USS Shaw, was awarded the Navy Cross on October 9, 1918, after his actions aboard USS Shaw on October 9, 1918, when Shaw collided with RMS Aquitania and was cut in two and set on fire. Fernandez threw the ammunition that was piled on the deck of Shaw overboard, saving the lives of many of his fellow crewmen.

== World War II ==
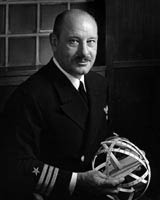
Commander Luis de Florez

On December 7, 1941, when the Empire of Japan attacked the United States Pacific Fleet at Pearl Harbor, many sailors with Hispanic surnames were among those who perished. Bob Fernandez, a notable survivor of the attack, was of Hispanic descent. When the United States officially entered World War II, Hispanic Americans were among the many American citizens who joined the ranks of the navy as volunteers or through the draft. Of the Hispanics who served actively in the European and Pacific Theatres of war, five would eventually earn the rank of rear admiral and above.

In 1941, Commander Luis de Florez played an instrumental role in the establishment of the Special Devices Division of the Navy's Bureau of Aeronautics (what would later become the NAWCTSD). He was later assigned as head of the new Special Devices Desk in the Engineering Division of the Navy's Bureau of Aeronautics. De Florez, who has been credited with over sixty inventions, urged the navy to undertake development of "synthetic training devices" to increase readiness. During World War II, he was promoted to captain and in 1944, to rear admiral.

=== Pacific Theatre ===
Admiral Horacio Rivero, Jr. served aboard USS San Juan and was involved in providing artillery cover for Marines landing on Guadalcanal, Marshall Islands, Iwo Jima, and Okinawa. For his service he was awarded the Bronze Star with Combat "V" ("V" stands for valor in combat). Rivero was reassigned to the USS Pittsburgh (CA-72) and is credited with saving his ship without a single life lost when the ship's bow had been torn off during a typhoon. He was awarded the Legion of Merit for his actions. Rivero also participated in the Battle of Santa Cruz Islands, the attack on Bougainville in the Solomons, the capture of the Gilbert Islands and a series of carrier raids on Rabaul. On June 5, 1945, Rivero was present during the first carrier raids against Tokyo during operations in the vicinity of Nansei Shoto. Rivero, served as a technical assistant on the Staff of Commander Joint Task Force One for Operation Crossroads from February 1946 to June 1947, and was on the Staff of Commander, Joint Task Force Seven during the atomic weapons tests in Eniwetok in 1948.

Rear Admiral Frederick Lois Riefkohl served as captain of USS Vincennes was assigned to the Fire Support Group, LOVE (with Transport Group XRAY) under the command of Rear Admiral Richmond K. Turner's Task Force TARE (Amphibious Force) during the landing in the Solomon Islands on August 7, 1942. On August 9, 1942, Vincennes was engaged in combat against a fleet of Japanese ships under the command of Japanese Admiral Mikawa just off Guadalcanal in what is known as the Battle of Savo Island and received 85 direct hits. Riefkohl, who was awarded the Purple Heart medal for the wounds which he received during the battle, ordered his men to abandon ship and to man the life rafts.

On February 23, 1945, Antonio F. Moreno witnessed the first flag raising photographed by Staff Sergeant Louis R. Lowery and the second flag raising photographed by Joe Rosenthal on Mount Suribachi. On March 8, 1945, Moreno, a navy medical corpsman assigned to the 2d Platoon, Company E, 27th Marine Regiment, tried to save the life of Lt. Jack Lummus after Lummus had stepped on a land mine a few feet away from Moreno. Lt. Lummus was posthumously awarded the Medal of Honor.

Rear Admiral Henry G. Sanchez commanded (as a Lieutenant Commander) VF-72, an F4F squadron of 37 aircraft, on board USS Hornet from July to October 1942. His squadron was responsible for shooting down 38 Japanese airplanes during his command tour, which included the Battle of the Santa Cruz Islands.

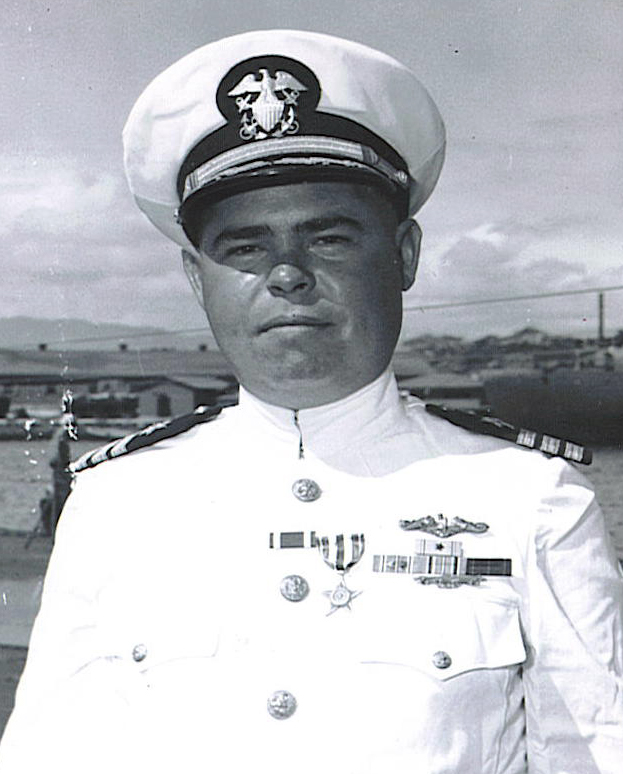
Captain Marion Frederic Ramírez de Arellano

Captain Marion Frederic Ramírez de Arellano (1913–1980), who was the first Hispanic submarine commanding officer, participated in five war patrols. He led the effort to rescue five navy pilots and one enlisted gunner off Wake Island, and contributed to the sinking of two Japanese freighters and damaging a third. For his actions, he was awarded a Silver Star Medal and a Legion of Merit Medal.

After a brief stint at the Mare Island Naval Shipyard, he was reassigned to USS Skate, a Balao-class submarine. He participated in Skate's first three war patrols and was awarded a second Silver Star Medal for his contribution in sinking the Japanese light cruiser Agano on his third patrol. Agano had survived a previous torpedo attack by the submarine USS Scamp.

In April 1944, Ramirez de Arellano was named commanding officer of USS Balao. He participated in his ship's war patrols 5, 6 and 7. On July 5, 1944, Ramirez de Arellano led the rescue of three downed navy pilots in the Palau area. On December 4, 1944, Balao departed from Pearl Harbor to patrol in the Yellow Sea. Balao engaged and sunk the Japanese cargo ship Daigo Maru on January 8, 1945. Ramirez de Arellano was awarded a Bronze Star Medal with Combat V and a Letter of Commendation.

Captain Charles Kenneth Ruiz was a crew member of the cruiser USS Vincennes during the Battle of Savo Island. After being rescued at sea and sent to Pearl Harbor, he was invited by Admiral Chester Nimitz to join the Submarine Service. He served aboard the submarine USS Pollack and participated in eight war patrols in the hostile waters of the Pacific during World War II.

=== European Theatre ===
Rear Admiral Edmund Ernest García was the commander of the destroyer escort USS Sloat and saw action in the invasions of Africa, Sicily, and France. USS Sloat was an Edsall-class destroyer escort which was launched on January 21, 1943, and commissioned on August 16, 1943, under the command of then Lieutenant Commander Garcia. From June 15 to July 15, Sloat operated in the Caribbean and Atlantic Ocean in search of German U-boats.

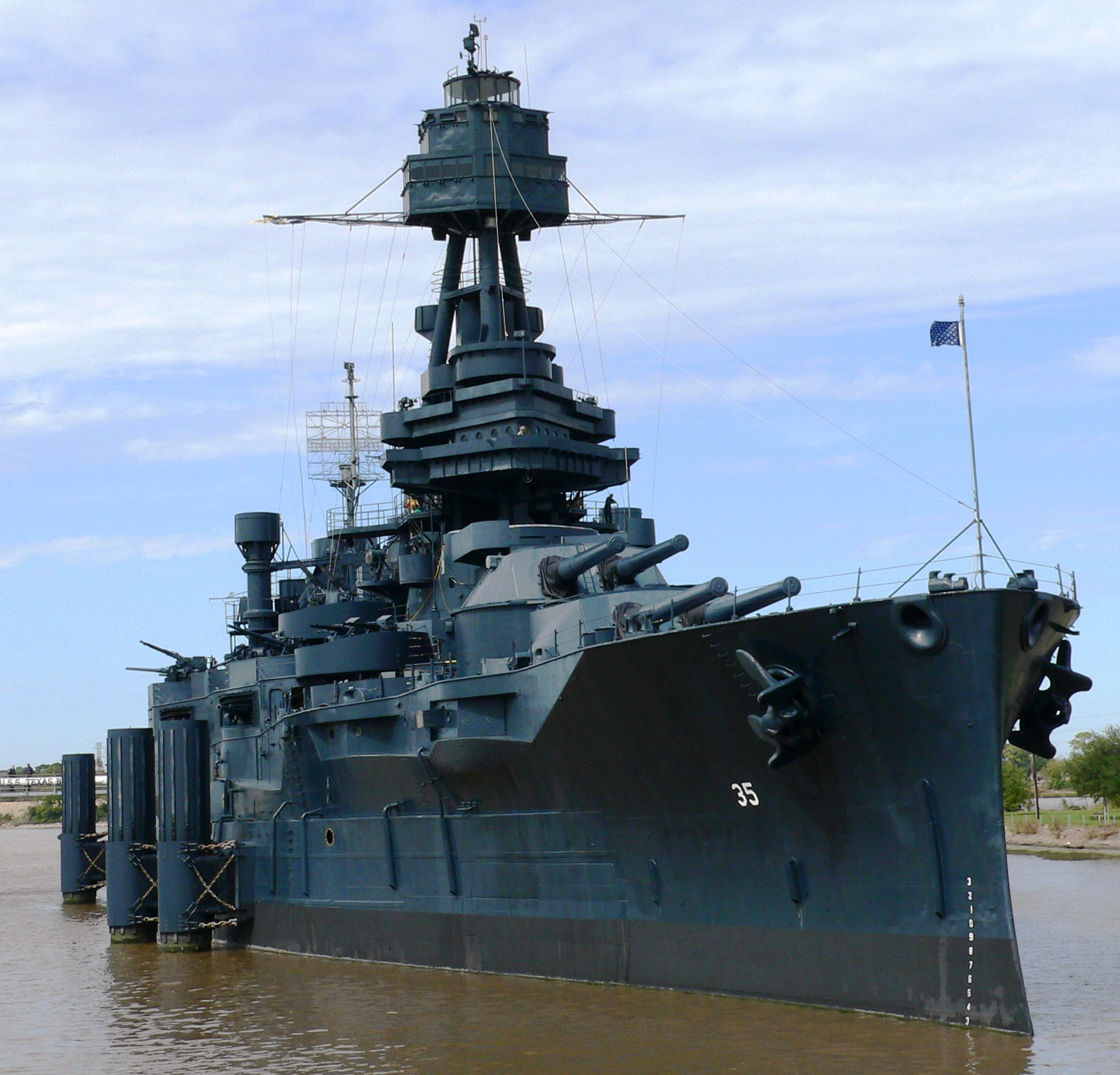
USS Texas

Rear Admiral Jose M. Cabanillas, was assigned Executive Officer of USS Texas. On November 8, Texas participated in the invasion of North Africa by destroying an ammunition dump near Port Lyautey. Cabanillas also participated in the invasion of Normandy on (D-Day). On June 6, 1944, the ship's secondary battery went to work on another target on the western end of "Omaha" beach.

In 1945, Cabanillas became the first Commanding officer of USS Grundy, which was commissioned on January 3, 1945. Grundy helped in the evacuation of Americans from China during the Chinese Civil War. In December 1945, he was reassigned to Naval Station Norfolk located in Norfolk, Virginia, as Assistant Chief of Staff (Discipline), 5th Naval District.

Rear Admiral Rafael Celestino Benítez was a Lieutenant Commander who saw action aboard submarines and on various occasions weathered depth charge attacks. For his actions, he was awarded the Silver and Bronze Star Medals.

Lieutenant Edward Hidalgo was born in Mexico City. After immigrating to the United States, he joined and served in the U.S. Naval Reserve. In this capacity he held several positions. From 1942 to 1943 he served in Montevideo, Uruguay, as a legal advisor to the ambassador to the Emergency Advisory for Political Defense. For the remainder of the war he was assigned to the aircraft carrier USS Enterprise as an air combat intelligence officer and was awarded a Bronze Star Medal for his service. In October 1979, Hidalgo became the first Hispanic to serve as U.S. Secretary of the Navy.

Of the 2,889 Navy Crosses which were awarded to the members of the navy during World War II, two were awarded to Hispanic sailors: Elguterio Joe Marquez, Pharmacist's Mate Third Class and Lieutenant Eugene Anthony Valencia, both from San Francisco, California.

=== The "WAVES" ===
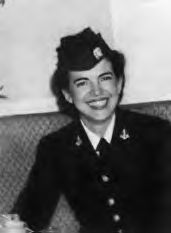
LTJG Maria Rodriguez Denton

Prior to World War II, traditional Hispanic cultural values expected women to be homemakers and they rarely left the home to earn an income and were discouraged from joining the military. However, with the outbreak of World War II, cultural prohibitions began to change. With the creation of the Women's Army Auxiliary Corps (WAAC), predecessor of the Women's Army Corps (WAC), and the U.S. Navy Women Accepted for Volunteer Emergency Service (WAVES), women could attend to certain administrative duties left open by the men who were reassigned to combat zones. While most women who served in the military joined the WAACs, a smaller number of women served in the Naval Women's Reserve (the WAVES).

Maria Menefee was born in Guadalajara, Mexico; she joined the WAVES in 1944 and was assigned to Bronson Field, Florida. Lieutenant Junior Grade (LTJG) Maria Rodriguez Denton was the first woman of Puerto Rican descent who became an officer in the United States Navy as a member of the WAVES.

== Cold War era ==
The "Cold War" was the period of conflict, tension and competition between the United States and the Soviet Union and their respective allies from the mid-1940s until the early 1990s. Throughout the period, the rivalry between the two superpowers was played out in multiple arenas: military coalitions; military; costly defense spending; a massive conventional and nuclear arms race; and many proxy wars.

=== The Cochino incident ===
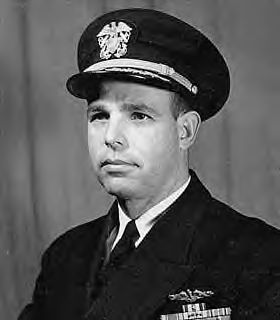
Rear Admiral R.C. Benitez

During the latter part of 1949, Rear Admiral Rafael Celestino Benítez was given the command of the submarine USS Cochino. On August 12, 1949,Cochino, along with USS Tusk, departed from the harbor of Portsmouth, England. Both diesel submarines were reported to be on a cold-water training mission. However, the submarines were equipped with snorkels that allowed them to spend long periods underwater, largely invisible to an enemy, and with electronic gear designed to detect far-off radio signals – were part of an American intelligence operation.

The mission of Cochino and Tusk was to eavesdrop on communications that revealed the testing of submarine-launched Soviet missiles that might soon carry nuclear warheads. This was the first American undersea spy mission of the cold war.

On August 25, one of Cochino's 4,000-pound batteries caught fire, emitting hydrogen gas and smoke. Unable to receive any help from Tusk, Commander Benitez directed the firefighting. He ordered Cochino to surface and had the crew members lash themselves to the deck rails with ropes while others fought the blaze. Benitez tried to save his ship and at the same time save his men from the toxic gases. He realized that the winds were about to tear the ropes and ordered his men to form a pyramid on the ship's open bridge, which was designed to hold seven men.

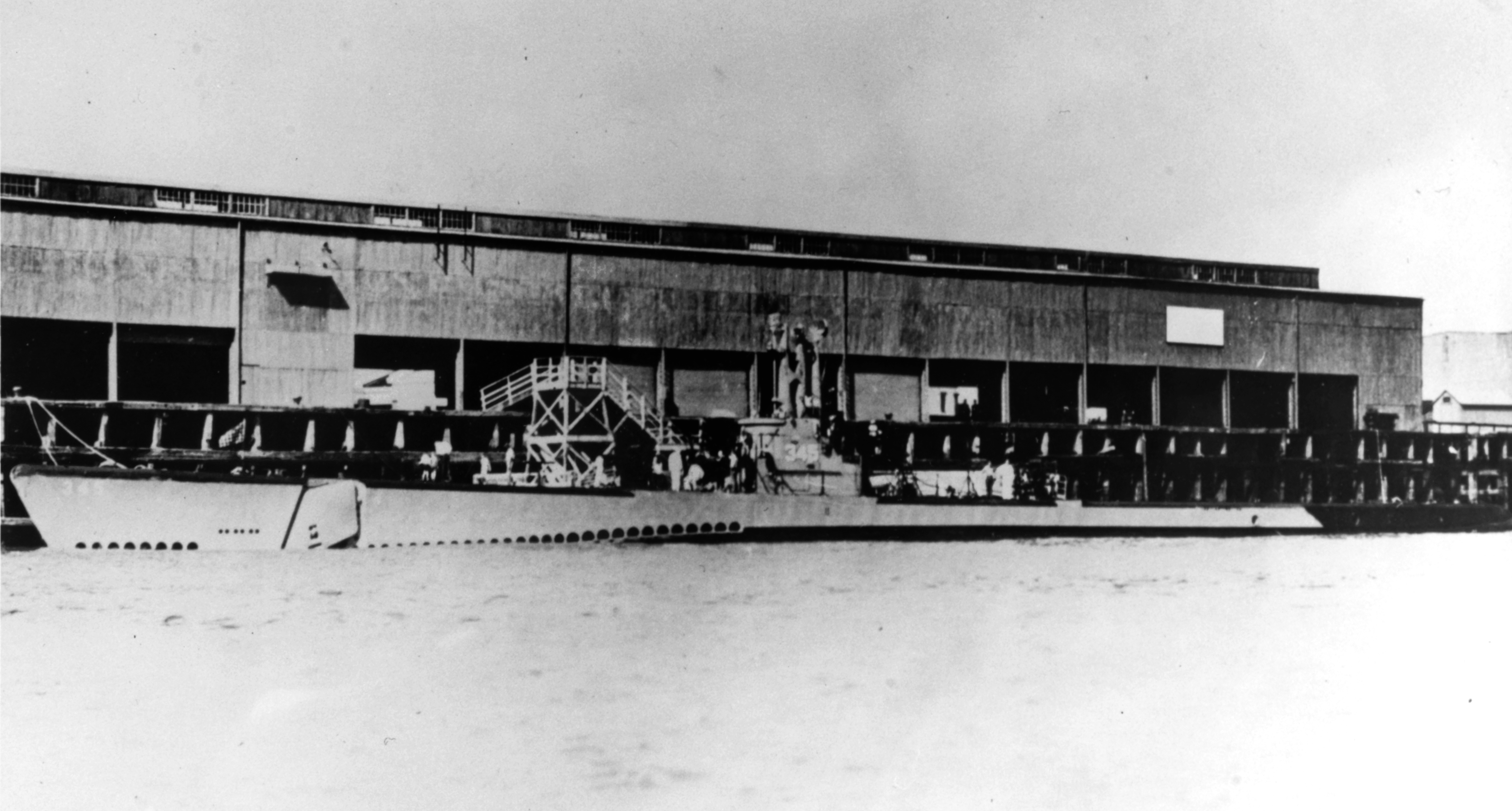
USS Tusk

The ocean waters became calmer during the night and Tusk was able to approach Cochino. All of the crew, with the exception of Commander Benitez and two of the crew who perished during the ordeal, boarded Tusk. Finally, the crew members of Tusk convinced Benitez to board Tusk, which he did two minutes before Cochino sank off the coast of Norway.

In 1952, Benitez was named chief of the United States naval mission to Cuba, a position which he held until 1954. In 1955, Rear Admiral Benitez was given the command of the destroyer USS Waldron. Waldron resumed normal operations along the east coast and in the West Indies under his command after having completed a circumnavigation of the globe. Rear Admiral Rafael Celestino Benítez was the recipient of two Silver Star Medals.

=== Korean War ===
The Korean War was an escalation of a civil war between two rival Korean regimes, each of which was supported by external powers, with each of the regimes trying to topple the other through political and guerrilla tactics. The conflict was expanded by the United States and the Soviet Union's involvement as part of the larger Cold War. The main hostilities were during the period from June 25, 1950, until the armistice (ceasefire agreement) was signed on July 27, 1953.

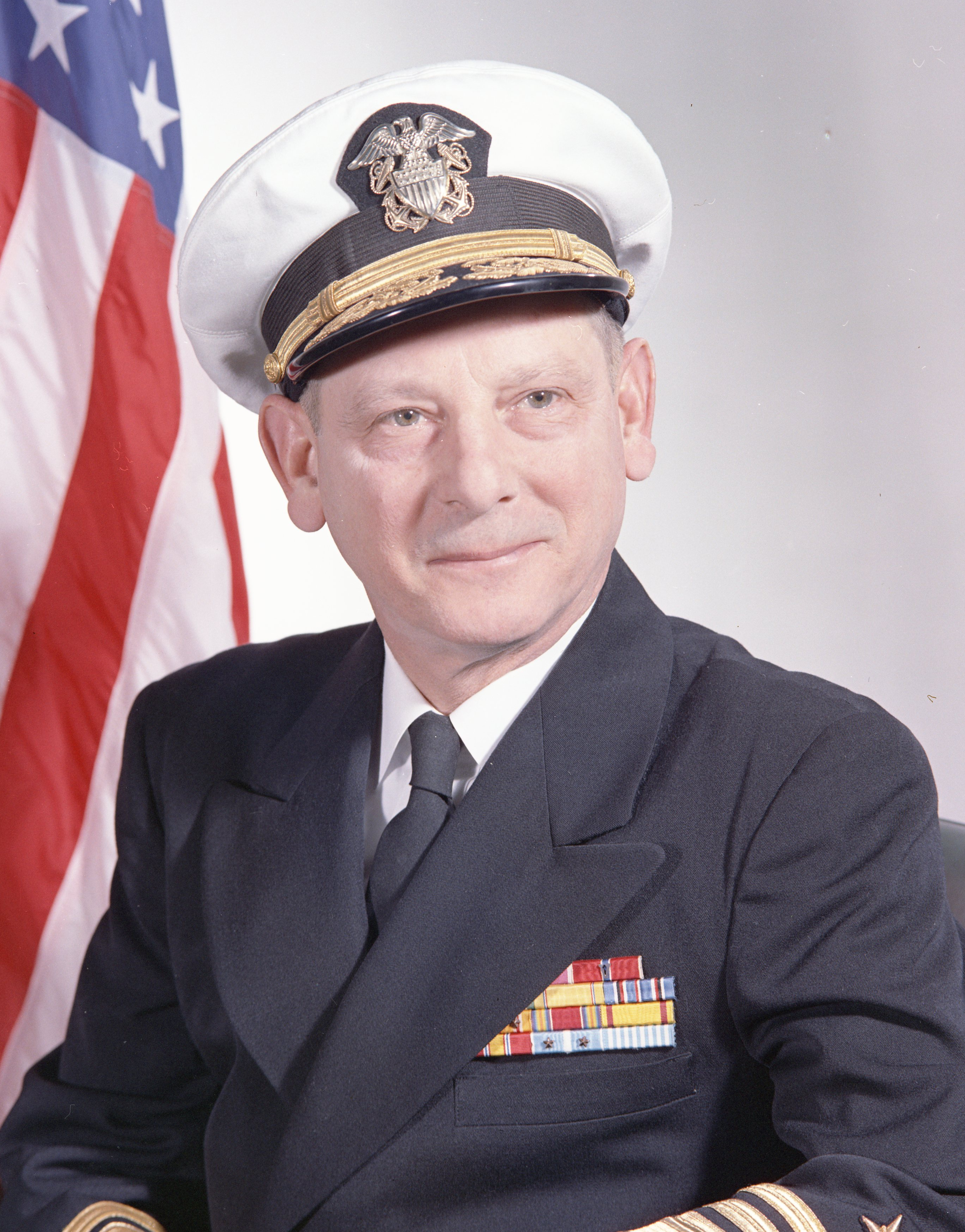
Admiral Horacio Rivero, Jr.

In August 1950, USS Noble, under the command of Admiral Horacio Rivero, Jr., steamed to Korea to participate in the September Inchon amphibious assault. Rivero's ship assisted in the transport of U.S. and foreign troops and equipment to and from the Korean combat zone. In July 1953, the ship participated in Operation Big Switch, moving Communist North Korean prisoners from Koje Do to Inchon pursuant to the armistice agreement. Rivero studied at the National War College and in 1954 he became Assistant Chief of Staff for Naval Operations. In 1955, he was promoted to the rank of rear admiral and was a member of the Staff of the Commander in Chief, Western Atlantic Area.

Of the 46 Navy Crosses awarded by the navy during the Korean War, one went to a Hispanic sailor, Robert Serrano, a Hospital Corpsman from El Paso, Texas.

On September 12, 1951, Medical Corpsman Serrano was serving with the 3rd Battalion, Seventh Marines, 1st Marine Division (Reinforced), in Korea. The Battalion came under heavy enemy attack and fearlessly dashed through the heavy enemy fire to reach a wounded Marine, he accidentally tripped the wire of a hidden anti-personnel mine. Hearing the snap of the fuse primer, and realizing that his wounded comrade lay helpless beside the deadly explosive, he courageously and with complete disregard for his own personal safety threw himself on the man to shield him from the explosion. Although he was seriously wounded in the back and legs by fragments, and was blown several feet by the concussion, he crawled back to his comrade and administered first aid to him. Although suffering severe pain from his multiple wounds, he refused to seek medical aid for himself until he had completed treatment of his comrade, and then, refusing a stretcher, crawled part of the way to the aid station.

=== Cuban Missile Crisis ===
The Cuban Missile Crisis was a tense confrontation between the Soviet Union and the United States over the Soviet deployment of nuclear missiles in Cuba. On October 22, 1962, Admiral Horacio Rivero was the commander of the American fleet sent by President John F. Kennedy to set up a quarantine (blockade) of the Soviet ships. On October 28, Soviet Premier Nikita Khrushchev ordered the removal of the Soviet missiles in Cuba, and Kennedy ordered an end of the quarantine of Cuba on November 20, bringing an end to the crisis.

=== Vietnam War ===
The Vietnam War, was a conflict between the Democratic Republic of Vietnam (DRVN, or North Vietnam) and the Republic of Vietnam (RVN, or South Vietnam), which eventually involved their respective allies including the United States.

On July 31, 1964, Horacio Rivero became the first Puerto Rican, and first Hispanic to become a four-star Admiral in the modern era US Navy. During the Vietnam War, Rivero oversaw the day-to-day work of the navy as the Vice Chief of Naval Operations. He was a stern supporter of a "brown-water navy", or riverine force, on the rivers of South Vietnam.

In 1964, Lieutenant Commander Benjamin F. Montoya was deployed to Guam with the Naval Mobile Construction Battalion Three. He led an advance party in Vietnam to supervise the construction of the first base camp built by SeaBees in Da Nang. He returned in 1966 to Chu Lai, and was responsible for the construction of a base camp, supply point, hospital and a Marine Corps helicopter base.

Lieutenant Commander Everett Alvarez Jr. endured one of the longest periods as a prisoner of war (POW) in American history. The grandson of immigrants from Mexico, Alvarez joined the United States Navy in 1960 and was selected for pilot training. On August 5, 1964, during Operation Pierce Arrow, Ensign Alvarez's A-4 Skyhawk was shot down over North Vietnam and became the first American POW of the Vietnam War. Alvarez endured eight years and seven months of brutal captivity in which he was repeatedly beaten and tortured. He was released from the prisoner of war camp in 1973 and retired as Commander in 1980.

Captain Charles Kenneth Ruiz commanded the aircraft carrier USS Bon Homme Richard in the Vietnam War. Bon Homme Richard was sent to Vietnam as the war escalated in early 1965. Ruiz, who commanded the aircraft carrier was deployed on five Southeast Asia combat tours over the next six years. Under Ruiz's command, Bon Homme Richard's aircraft battled North Vietnamese MiGs (supersonic jet fighter aircraft made in Russia) on many occasions, downing several, as well as striking transportation and infrastructure targets. Ruiz was awarded the Bronze Star Medal with Combat V and other awards for service in Vietnam.

Hospitalman Third Class (then Hospitalman) Phil Isadore Valdez, from New Mexico, was posthumously awarded the Navy Cross for his actions on January 29, 1967. On that date Valdez ran over seventy-five yards of open terrain, under constant enemy fire, to aid a fallen Marine. He then moved the wounded man to a safe area and, quickly and competently, rendered medical assistance. Again exposing himself to enemy fire, Valdez moved across approximately fifty yards of open ground to another Marine. While treating the second Marine, he positioned himself between the man and the hostile fire. It was at this time that Valdez was mortally wounded by enemy small-arms fire.

Lieutenant Diego E. Hernández flew two combat tours in Vietnam during the war. He also served as Aide and Flag Lieutenant to Commander, Carrier Division 14. At sea, he was the commander of a fighter squadron, a carrier air wing, and a fleet oiler (USS Truckee). Chief Petty Officer, Henry Ruiz, Vietnam, Naval Special Warfare

=== NATO commander ===
Admiral Horacio Rivero Jr., was the North Atlantic Treaty Organization's commander in chief of the Allied Forces in Southern Europe from 1968 until his retirement from the navy in 1972. He was responsible for the land, sea and air forces of five nations deployed in the Mediterranean area: Italy, Greece, Turkey, Britain and the United States. During his years as commander, some 215,000 of the 310,000 American troops in Europe were stationed in West Germany.

== Latter part of the 20th century ==
Latino representation in the navy has been rising and there has been dramatic increases in the percentage of Latinos (of both sexes) among active duty enlisted personnel. In 1975, Lieutenant Al Cisneros, became the first Hispanic pilot to serve with the Blue Angels. In 1981, four women of Hispanic descent became the first women of their heritage from the U.S. Naval Academy. Among the four women was Commander Lilia L. Ramirez (Ret.) who is currently the Director of the International Programs Office, for the Department of Homeland Security, Science and Technology Directorate. By September 2006, Hispanics constituted 14 percent of navy enlisted personnel, about the same as in the Marine Corps that year. The various recruitment efforts do have critics, both within and outside the Hispanic community, particularly during this time of war and a growing number of reported Hispanic casualties.

=== Skirmish with Libyan Air Force ===
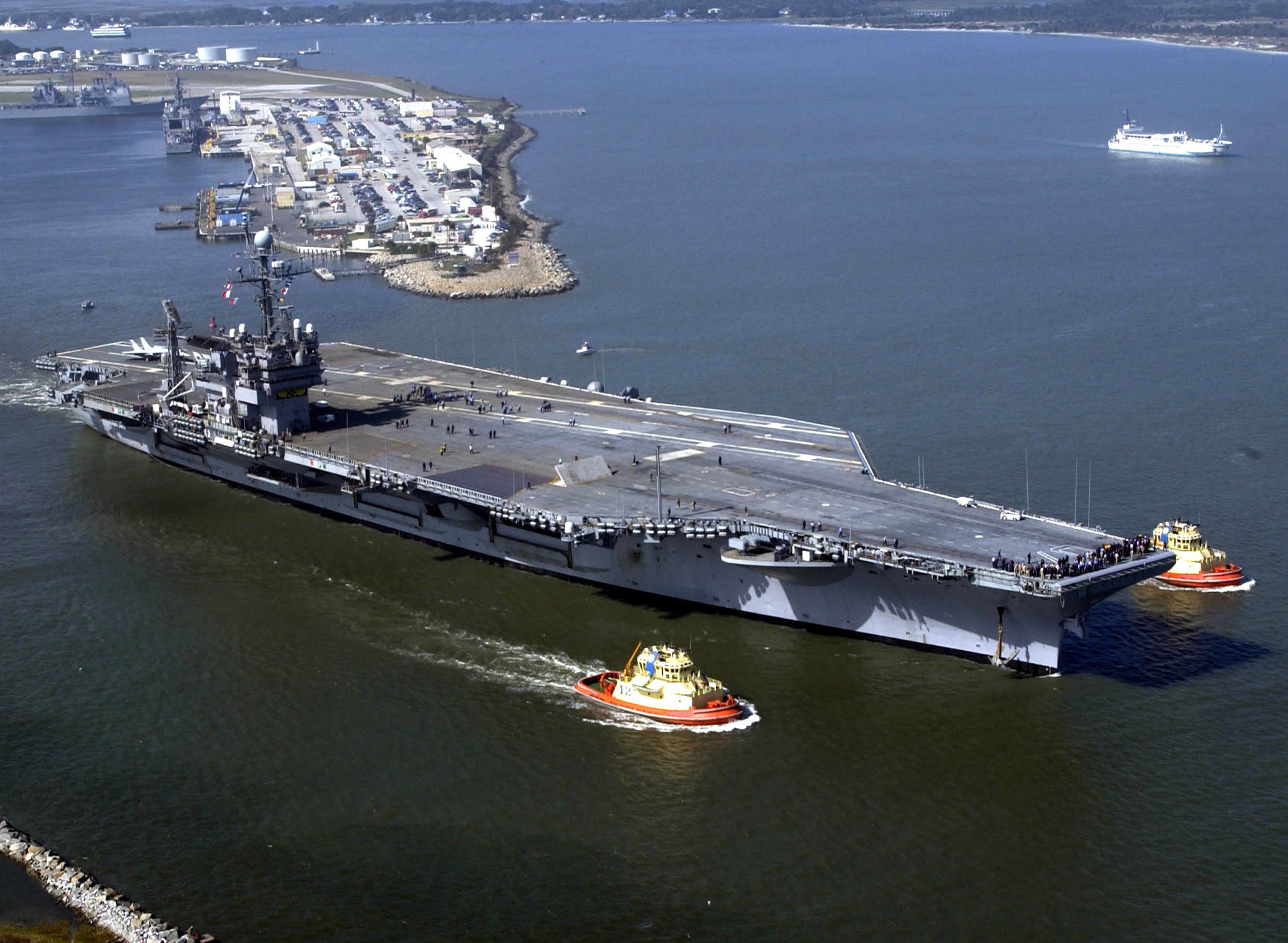
USS John F. Kennedy

On June 27, 1980, Captain Diego E. Hernández took command of the aircraft carrier USS John F. Kennedy which is capable of anti-submarine warfare (ASW), making it an all-purpose carrier. On September 19, 1980, Libyan Air Force planes engaged in an unprecedented number of sorties in the vicinity of USS John F. Kennedy's Battle Group over international waters. F-14's under E-2 control intercepted two Libyan sections, and six and eighteen sections, respectively, on September 20 and 21.

=== Operations Desert Shield and Desert Storm ===
Many Hispanic servicewomen served overseas during Operations Desert Shield and Desert Storm. Among the many women who served was Captain Haydee Javier Kimmich from Cabo Rojo, Puerto Rico. Capt. Kimmich was the highest ranking Hispanic female in the navy at the time. She was assigned as the Chief of Orthopedics at the Navy Medical Center in Bethesda and she reorganized their Reservist Department during the war.

During Operation Just Cause in December 1989, Navy Reserve Commodore Maria Morales from Puerto Rico was deployed to Panama and served at Rodman Naval Station. According to Morales, in Panama she had her first real experience with the anguish and impact of an armed conflict, not only on military service members, but on families as well.

Rear Admiral Jose Luis Betancourt, Jr. served as commanding officer of the USS Merrill (DD-976), during its deployment to the Persian Gulf during Operation Desert Storm, where during extensive mine clearance operations his ship served as flagship.

=== Operation Iraqi Freedom ===
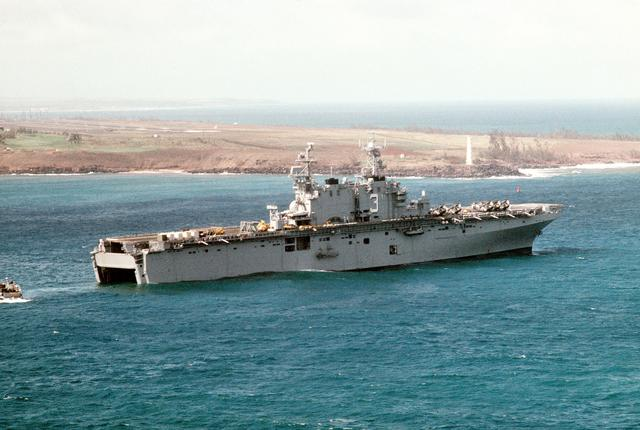
USS Belleau Wood commanded by Brigadier General Joseph V. Medina

Even though Brigadier General Joseph V. Medina of the Marine Corps was not a member of the navy, he made naval history when on June 10, 2004, he became the first Marine general ever assigned commander of naval ships. During Operation Iraqi Freedom, Medina oversaw the manning and equipping of ESG-3. From his flagship, the USS Belleau Wood (LHA-3), he then led the Belleau Wood Strike Group (BWDESG) through a 6-month deployment in support of where he was assigned as Commander Task Force 58.

Hospitalman Apprentice Luis E. Fonseca was awarded the Navy Cross. According to his citation, Fonseca was serving as Corpsman for the Amphibious Assault Vehicle Platoon, Company C, First Battalion, Second Marines, Regimental Combat Team TWO, Task Force Tarawa, First Marine Expeditionary Force, in support of Operation Iraqi Freedom on March 23, 2003. After an amphibious assault vehicle was struck by a rocket-propelled grenade inflicting five casualties, Fonseca evacuated the wounded Marines from the burning vehicle and tended to their wounds. He established a casualty collection point inside the unit's medical evacuation amphibious assault vehicle, calmly and methodically stabilizing two casualties with lower limb amputations by applying tourniquets and administering morphine. His vehicle was rendered immobile by enemy direct and indirect fire, however he directed the movement of four casualties from the vehicle by organizing litter teams from available Marines. He personally carried one critically wounded Marine over open ground to another vehicle. Fonseca again exposed himself to enemy fire to treat Marines wounded along the perimeter.

== Hispanics in sensitive domestic leadership positions ==
Hispanics have been underrepresented in the all-volunteer armed forces, especially among officers. Despite the fact that Hispanics make up large percentage of the total navy population, they make up only 4.9% of the officers corps. This is beginning to change, as increasing numbers of Hispanics enter the military. The following Hispanics (in alphabetical order) either have or are currently serving their country in sensitive domestic leadership positions:

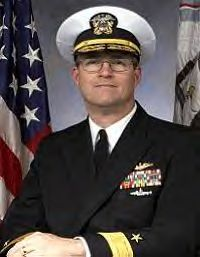
RADM Jay A. DeLoach

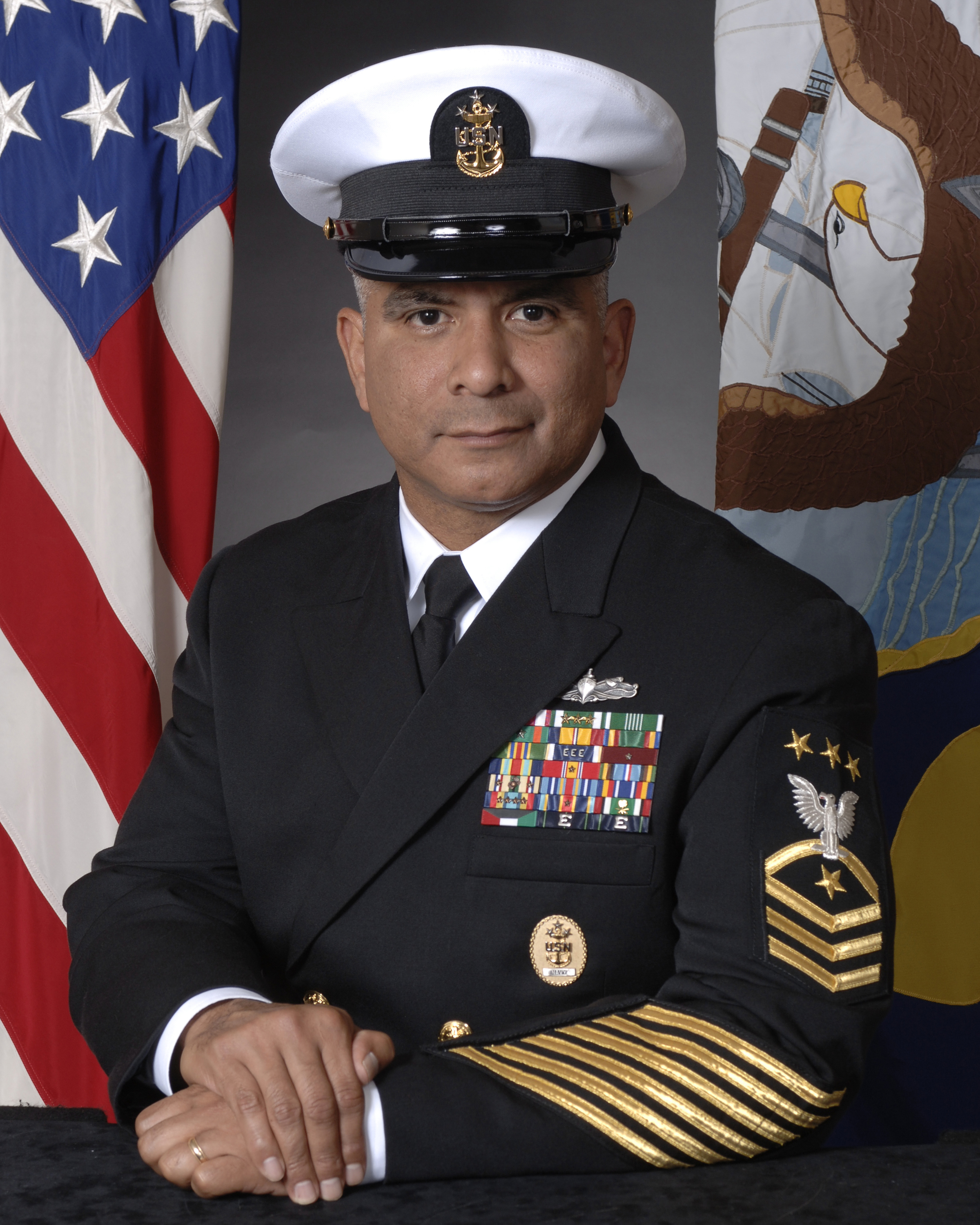
MCPON Joe R. Campa

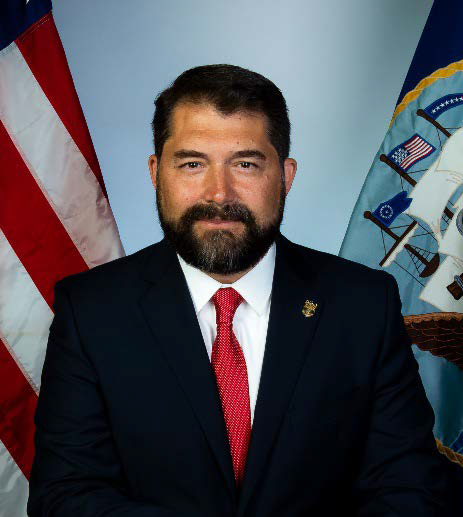
Omar R. Lopez, NCIS director

- Rear Admiral Jose Luis Betancourt, Jr. (Surface Warfare) (Ret.), was Commander, Mine Warfare Command, headquartered at Naval Air Station (NAS) Corpus Christi, Texas.
- Rear Admiral Patrick H. Brady is a submarine commander who in July 2007 became the first person of Hispanic descent to be named Commander of the Naval Undersea Warfare Center (N87B).
- Rear Admiral Jay A. DeLoach (Ret.) was the Assistant Deputy Chief of Naval Operations for Resources, Requirements and Assessments. DeLoach played an instrumental role in implementing a visionary "Memorandum of Understanding" between the Submarine Force Active component and the Reserve component. He helped pioneer many key initiatives that have since been adopted navy-wide.
- Rear Admiral Alberto Díaz, Jr. (Medical Corps) (Ret.), was the first Hispanic to become the Director of the San Diego Naval District and Balboa Naval Hospital.
- Rear Admiral Philip A. Dur (Ret.) was the Director, Political Military Affairs on the staff of the National Security Council.
- Rear Admiral Albert Garcia, Civil Engineer Corps, is assumed the duties of Deputy Commander of the First Naval Construction Division.
- Rear Admiral George "Rico" Mayer is the Commander of the Naval Safety Center.
- Rear Admiral Rodrigo C. Melendez (Dental Corps) (Ret.), served as Assistant Chief for Education, Training and Personnel, Bureau of Medicine and Surgery in Washington, D.C.
- Rear Admiral Marc Y.E. Pelaez, from 1990 to 1993, he served as the Executive Assistant to the Assistant Secretary of the Navy and from 1993 to 1996 as director of submarine technology at the Defense Advanced Research Projects Agency (DARPA), and Chief of the Office of Naval Research.
- Rear Admiral Will Rodriguez is the Chief Engineer for the Space and Naval Warfare Systems Command (SPAWAR 05).
- In March 2005, Capt. Kathlene Contres, the navy's highest-ranking female Hispanic Line Officer on active duty, became the first Hispanic woman and the thirteenth Commandant to lead the Defense Equal Opportunity Management Institute (DEOMI) since it was established in 1971. She oversaw the joint-service school supporting all Department of Defense and U.S. Coast Guard equal opportunity and equal employment opportunity (EO/EEO) program and research requirements. She is also the president of the Association of Naval Service Officers.
- Master Chief Petty Officer of the Navy Joe R. Campa Jr., is the 11th Master Chief Petty Officer of the Navy|Master Chief Petty Officer of the United States Navy. His duty assignments include USS Ogden (LPD-5), San Diego, California; Naval Medical Center, San Diego, California; Seventh Marine Regiment, First Marine Division, Camp Pendleton; Naval Hospital, Long Beach, California; Third Force Service Support Group, Fleet Marine Force, Okinawa, Japan and Naval Hospital Bremerton, Washington.
- On June 4, 2019, Omar R. Lopez was sworn in as the sixth civilian director of the Naval Criminal Investigative Service. He is the first Hispanic to serve in the role.

== Increase in Hispanic enlistment ==
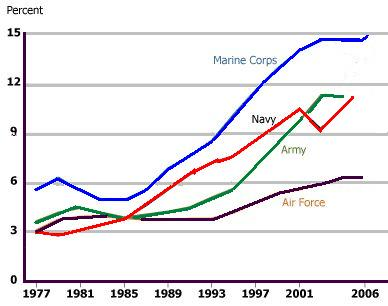
Trend of Hispanic enlistment (Source: Department of Defense, Population Representation in the Military Services, Fiscal Year 2004; and data provided by the Office of the Deputy Under Secretary of Defense).

Hispanic immigrants have played an important role in the military of the United States since the American Revolution when Lieutenant Jordi Farragut Mesquida, an immigrant from Spain, fought in the Battle of Charleston, South Carolina.

On July 3, 2002, President George W. Bush issued an order to speed up the process of citizenship for immigrants serving in the nation's military services. Immigrant service members can now qualify for citizenship after serving honorably for one year in the armed forces or for serving on active duty during an authorized period of conflict, among other qualifications listed under the Immigration and Nationality Act, Section 328.

One of the privileges that goes with American citizenship is the opportunity to become a commissioned officer in the navy. A person can be drafted as a resident alien or he/she can join the navy voluntarily as a foreigner, but can not become an officer unless they are a U.S. citizen.

The number of Hispanics in the navy over-represent their percentage of the population. Today the United States Department of Defense faces a nationwide problem in recruiting men for the all volunteer Armed Forces because of the war in Iraq and Afghanistan. The United States Navy has implemented an aggressive recruitment programs directed towards this group. One of those programs is El Navy whose principal aim is to attract those who speak Spanish and as a consequence many Hispanics have joined the navy as enlisted personnel and many others have applied for entrance to the Naval Academy.

=== United States Naval Academy ===
The United States Naval Academy (USNA) is an institution for the undergraduate education of officers of the United States Navy and Marine Corps. Hispanics in the United States Naval Academy account for the largest minority group in the institution. According to the academy, the Class of 2009 includes 271 (22.2%) minority midshipmen. Out of these 271 midshipmen, 115 are of Hispanic heritage. According to the July 2004 issue of Latina Style magazine, of the total of 736 female midshipmen, 74 (10%) of the female midshipmen were of Hispanic descent.

The first Hispanic-American to graduate from the academy was Commodore Robert F. Lopez, Class of 1879. The first Hispanic to graduate from the academy and to reach the rank of admiral was a Puerto Rican, Rear Admiral Frederick Lois Riefkohl. Class of 1911. Commander Lilia L. Ramirez and Midshipman Carmel Gilliland were among the first four Hispanic female graduates of the academy in 1981. A total of 31 Americans of Hispanic descent who served in the navy were alumni of the naval academy.

=== Hispanic Heritage Month ===
On September 17, 1968, President Lyndon B. Johnson designated a week in mid-September as National Hispanic Heritage Week. In 1988, President Ronald Reagan extended that week to a month-long observance. The National Hispanic Heritage Month is a time for Americans to educate themselves about the influences Hispanic culture has had on society. The Navy has realized that the fastest-growing group in both the United States and the navy are Hispanics, and have joined the rest of the United States in the celebration of the contributions which Hispanics in the United States Navy have made to that military institution by celebrating National Hispanic Heritage Month from September 15 through October 15.

== See also ==
- Hispanic Admirals in the United States Navy
- Hispanics in the United States Naval Academy
- Hispanics in the United States Marine Corps
- Hispanics in the United States Coast Guard
- Hispanics in the United States Air Force
- Hispanic Americans in World War II
- Hispanics in the American Civil War
- United States Navy
