= Rafael Celestino Benítez =

United States Navy admiral

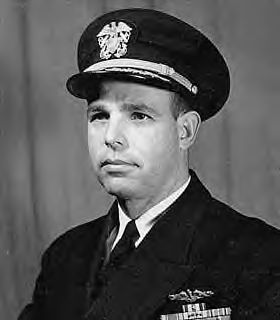
- Rear Admiral Rafael Celestino Benítez
- Born: March 9, 1917; Juncos, Puerto Rico
- Died: March 6, 1999 (aged 81); Easton, Maryland, U.S.
- Burial place: Oxford Cemetery in Oxford, Maryland
- Military career
- Allegiance: United States of America
- Branch: United States Navy
- Service years: 1939–1959
- Rank: Rear Admiral
- Commands: USS Cochino (SS-345)
- Conflicts: World War II
- Awards: Silver Star (2); Bronze Star
- Other work: Pan American Airways VP

Rear Admiral Rafael Celestino Benítez (March 9, 1917 – March 6, 1999) was a highly decorated American submarine commander who led the rescue effort of the crew members of the USS Cochino during the Cold War. After retiring from the navy, he was Pan American World Airways' vice president for Latin America. He taught international law for 16 years at the University of Miami School of Law, and served as associate dean, interim dean and director and founder of the foreign graduate law program. While there, he founded the comparative law LL.M. program, the inter-American law LL.M. program, and the Inter-American Law Review. After his death, the university established a scholarship in his memory to benefit a foreign attorney who is enrolled in one of the Law School's LL.M. programs.

== Early years ==
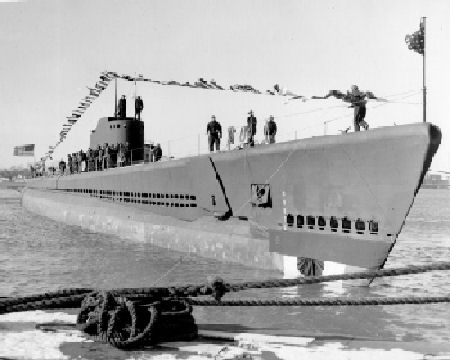
USS Halibut (SS-232)

Benítez was born in Juncos, Puerto Rico, He attended George Washington High School and Army-Navy Preparatory School, both in New York City. After he finished high school, he was accepted in the United States Naval Academy by appointment of the Honorable Santiago Iglesias, Puerto Rico's Resident Commissioner. He graduated from the academy in 1939 and was assigned to submarine duty.

== World War II ==
During World War II, Benítez saw action aboard the submarines USS Dace (SS-247) and USS Grenadier (SS-210) and on various occasions weathered depth charge attacks. For his actions, he was awarded the Silver Star twice and the Bronze Star Medal.

He served as commanding officer (with the rank of lieutenant commander) of the submarine USS Halibut (SS-232) from February 15, 1945, to May 19, 1945. The Halibut was the first ship of the United States Navy to be named for the halibut, a large species of flatfish. She was launched on December 3, 1941, and commissioned on April 10, 1942. The Halibut had an impressive war record, which included sinking 12 Japanese ships, but was damaged beyond reasonable repair on her tenth and final war patrol, which ended on December 1, 1944. Benítez's only mission as commander of the Halibut was to bring her from San Francisco to Portsmouth, New Hampshire, where she was decommissioned on July 18, 1945.

== Post war ==
On January 29, 1946, Lieutenant Commander Benítez was given command of the USS Trumpetfish. Benítez, inspired by his father who was a judge, attended Georgetown Law School and earned his law degree in June 1949.

== Cochino incident ==
During the latter part of 1949, early in the Cold War Era, Benítez was given the command of the submarine USS Cochino. On August 12, 1949, the Cochino, along with the USS Tusk, departed from the harbor of Portsmouth, England. Both diesel submarines were reported to be on a cold-water training mission. However, according to Blind Man's Bluff: The Untold Story of American Submarine Espionage, the submarines – equipped with snorkels that allowed them to spend long periods underwater, largely invisible to an enemy, and with electronic gear designed to detect far-off radio signals – were part of an American intelligence operation.

The mission of the Cochino and Tusk was to eavesdrop on communications that revealed the testing of submarine-launched Soviet missiles that might soon carry nuclear warheads. This was the first American undersea spy mission of the cold war.

On August 25, one of the Cochino's 4,000-pound batteries caught fire, emitting hydrogen gas and smoke. Unable to receive any help from the Tusk, Commander Benítez directed the firefighting. He ordered the Cochino to surface and had dozens of crew members lash themselves to the deck rails with ropes while others fought the blaze. Benítez tried to save his ship and at the same time save his men from the toxic gases. He realized that the winds were about to tear the ropes and ordered his men to form a pyramid on the ship's open bridge, which was designed to hold seven men.

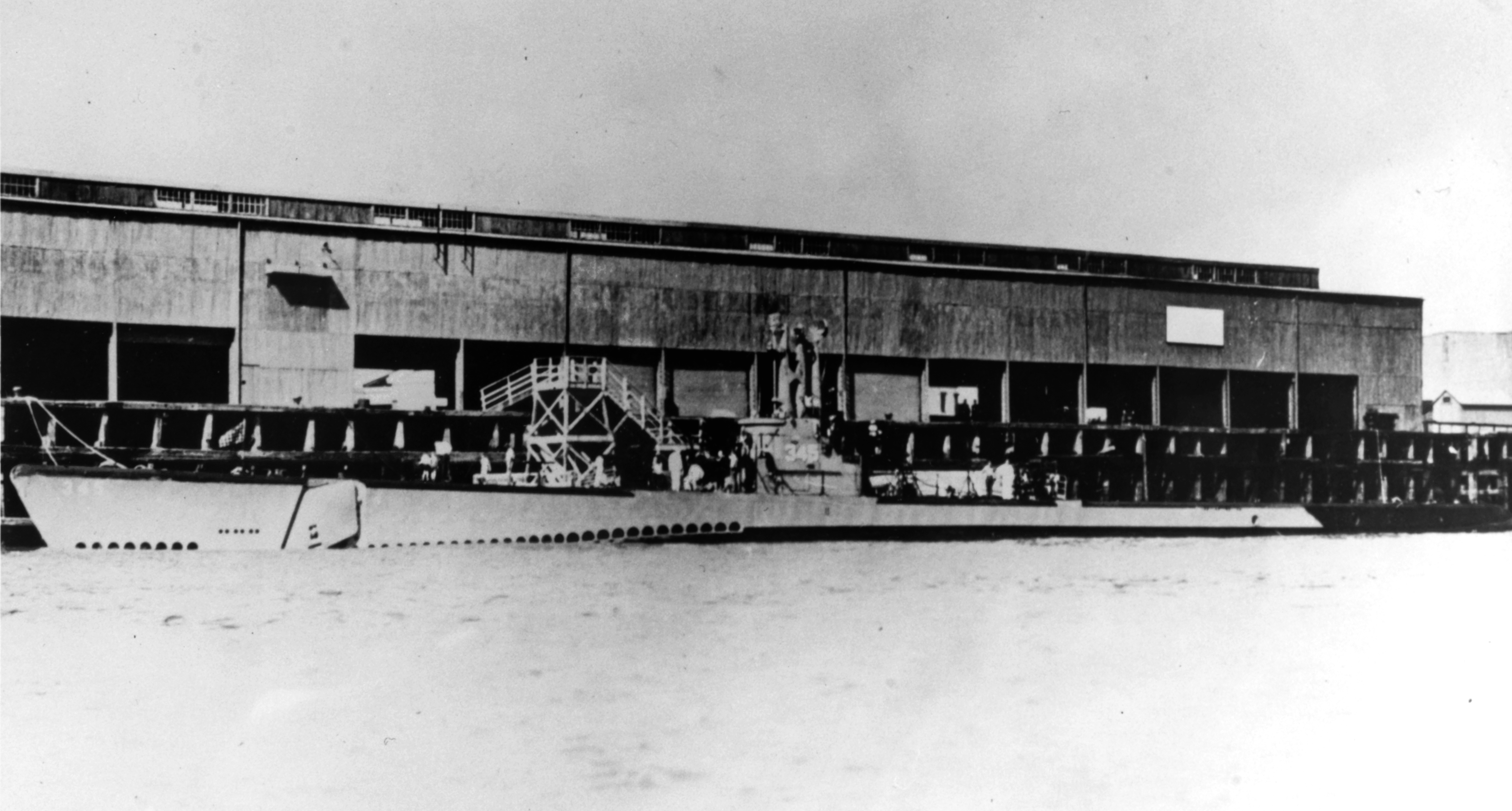
USS Cochino

The Cochino suffered two casualties, Lt. Cmdr. Richard M. Wright, who survived despite the fact that he was severely burned, and Robert Philo, a civilian sonar expert, who attempted to reach the Tusk on a raft to report on the conditions of the Cochino, but was knocked overboard along with 11 of the Tusk's crew members. As a result, Philo and six of the Tusk's crew perished.

The ocean waters became calmer during the night and the Tusk was able to approach the Cochino. All of the crew, with the exception of Commander Benítez, boarded the Tusk. Finally, the crew members of the Tusk convinced Benítez to board the Tusk, which he did two minutes before the Cochino sank off the coast of Norway.

== Aftermath of the Cochino incident ==
According to the New York Times of April 5, 1997, "On September 20, 1949, the Soviet publication Red Fleet said the Cochino had been "not far from Murmansk" and suggested that it had been seeking military information. On September 23, President Harry S. Truman, confirming fears that had led to Commander Benitez's mission, announced that the Soviet Union had detonated its first nuclear device".

== Late career ==
In 1952, Benítez was named chief of the United States naval mission to Cuba, a position which he held until 1954. In 1955, Benítez was given the command of the destroyer USS Waldron. The Waldron resumed normal operations along the East Coast and in the West Indies under his command after having completed a circumnavigation of the globe.

== Post-Navy career ==
Benítez retired from the United States Navy in 1959 and was promoted to the rank of rear admiral as he had been decorated for heroism in combat.

He became Pan American World Airways' vice president for Latin America. He taught international law and was associate dean at the University of Miami Law School and dean of the university's graduate school of international studies. During his years at University of Miami Law School, Benítez founded the Graduate Program for Foreign Lawyers, now known as the LL.M. Program in Comparative Law. He also inaugurated the "Lawyer of the Americas" (the predecessor of the Inter-American Law Review) and started the Masters Program in Inter-American Law for U.S. Lawyers.

In 1978, he served as a board member of the US Foundation of the University of the Valley of Guatemala, located in Delaware. Benítez was also the author of Anchors (ISBN 1-884878-05-9), a compilation of ethical and practical maxims, published in August 1996. On March 15, 2000, the University of Miami School of Law launched a Rafael C. Benítez Scholarship Fund to support the studies of foreign graduate students.

Benítez resided in Easton, Maryland, with his wife and three children, a son and two daughters. On March 6, 1999, he died at the Memorial Hospital located in Easton. He was buried with full military honors at Oxford Cemetery in Talbot County, Maryland.

In 2020 Rafael Celestino Benítez was posthumously inducted to the Puerto Rico Veterans Hall of Fame.

== Silver Star and Bronze Star citations ==
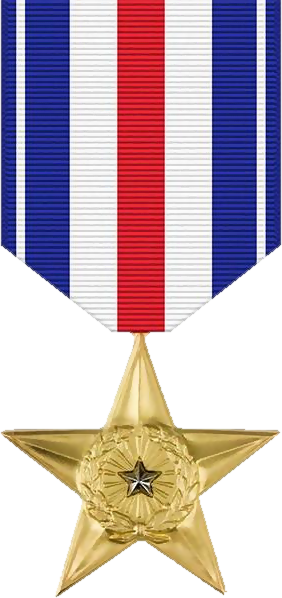

Rafael Celestino Benitez

UNITED STATES NAVY
Rank: Lieutenant Commander
Company: Assistant Approach Officer
Division: U.S.S. Dace (SS-247)

The President of the United States of America takes pleasure in presenting the Silver Star to Lieutenant Commander Rafael Celestino Benitez (NSN: 0-82557/1100), United States Navy, for conspicuous gallantry and intrepidity as Assistant Approach Officer of the U.S.S. DACE (SS-247), during the FIFTH War Patrol of that Submarine in enemy Japanese-controlled waters, from 1 September to 6 November 1944. Expertly utilizing attack data and fire control equipment, Lieutenant Commander Benitez rendered invaluable assistance to his Commanding Officer in delivering attacks to destroy one major enemy warship and two large merchantmen. His skill and devotion to duty were in keeping with the highest traditions of the United States Naval Service. General Orders: Commander 7th Fleet: Serial 01136 (April 3, 1945)

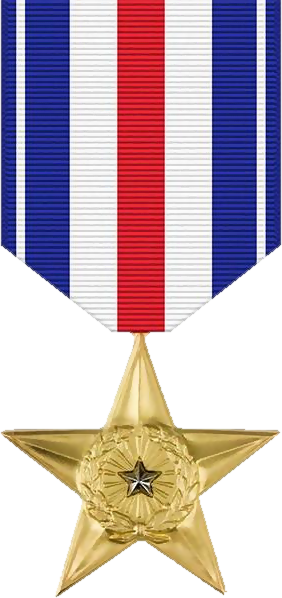

Rafael Celestino Benitez

UNITED STATES NAVY
Rank: Lieutenant Commander
Company: Engineer and Diving Officer
Division: U.S.S. Grenadier (SS-210)

The President of the United States of America takes pleasure in presenting a Gold Star in lieu of a Second Award of the Silver Star to Lieutenant Commander [then Lieutenant, Junior Grade] Rafael Celestino Benitez (NSN: 0-82557/1100), United States Navy, for conspicuous gallantry and intrepidity as Engineer and Diving Officer, attached to the U.S.S. GRENADIER (SS-210), in action against enemy Japanese forces during the SECOND War Patrol of that Submarine in the Pacific Area from 12 April to 10 June 1942. Precisely controlling depth, Lieutenant Commander Benitez rendered valuable assistance to his Commanding Officer during attacks which resulted in the sinking of two enemy ships totaling 24,400 tons and, in addition, contributed materially to the success of his ship in evading enemy countermeasures. His conduct throughout was an inspiration to the officers and men of his ship and was in keeping with the highest traditions of the United States Naval Service. General Orders: Commander Submarines Pacific: Serial 0410 (September 13, 1946)

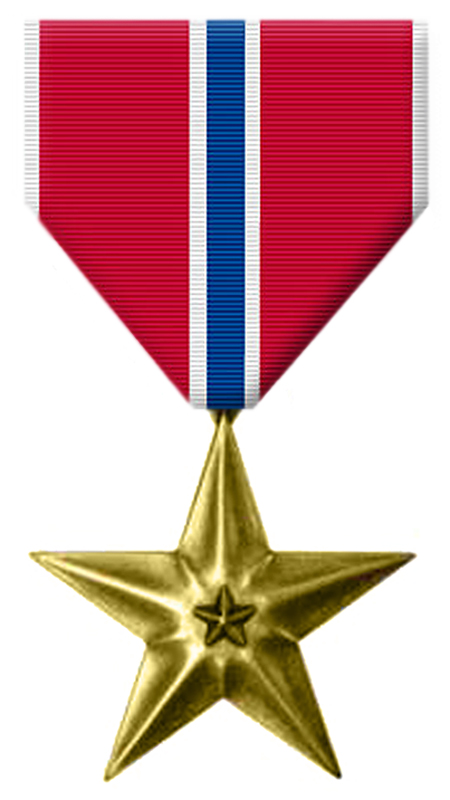

Rafael Celestino Benitez

UNITED STATES NAVY
Rank: Lieutenant Commander
Company: Assistant Approach Officer
Division: U.S.S. Dace (SS-247)

The President of the United States of America takes pleasure in presenting the Bronze Star Medal with Combat "V" to Lieutenant Commander Rafael Celestino Benitez (NSN: 0-82557/1100), United States Navy, for heroic service as Assistant Approach Officer of the U.S.S. DACE (SS-247), during the SIXTH War Patrol of that Submarine in action against enemy Japanese forces in the South China Sea Area from 2 December 1944 to 28 January 1945. Skilled and efficient in the performance of his duties, Lieutenant Commander Benitez assisted his Commanding Officer in accomplishing a special mine-laying mission in very shallow waters close to hostile shorelines and in conducting successful attacks which resulted in the sinking of one enemy freighter and the damaging of another. Through his coolness and initiative, he contributed directly to the success of his vessel in evading hostile countermeasures, and his devotion to duty was in keeping with the highest traditions of the United States Naval Service. (Lieutenant Commander Benitez is authorized to wear the Combat "V".)

Among Rear Admiral Benítez's decorations and medals were the following:

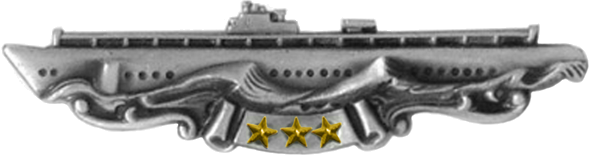

Submarine Officers Warfare insignia
Silver Star with gold star
Bronze Star with "V" device	Navy Unit Commendation	American Defense Service Medal
American Campaign Medal	Asiatic-Pacific Campaign Medal with four battle stars	World War II Victory Medal
Navy Occupation Service Medal	National Defense Service Medal	Philippine Liberation Medal
Submarine Combat Patrol insignia

== See also ==
- Hispanic Admirals in the United States Navy
- List of Puerto Ricans
- Puerto Ricans in World War II
- List of Puerto Rican military personnel
- Hispanics in the United States Navy
- Hispanics in the United States Naval Academy
