= Philip Bazaar =

US Navy seaman who received the Medal of Honor during the American Civil War

- Born: Chile
- Military career
- Allegiance: United States of America; Union
- Branch: United States Navy
- Rank: Ordinary Seaman
- Unit: USS Santiago de Cuba
- Conflicts: American Civil War: Battle of Fort Fisher
- Awards: Medal of Honor; Navy Civil War Campaign Medal

Philip Bazaar was a Chilean American United States Navy seaman who was awarded the Medal of Honor, the highest military decoration of the United States for valor in combat. According to the citation he distinguished himself during the battle for Fort Fisher of the American Civil War.

== Biography ==
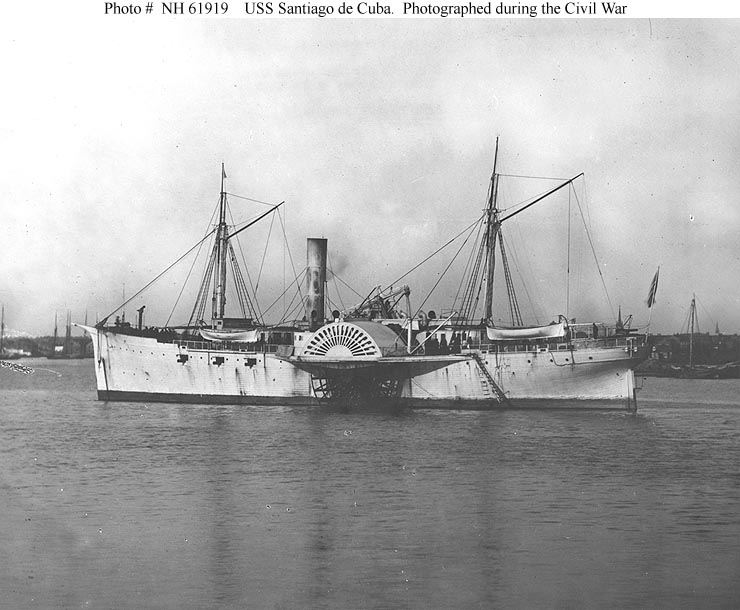
USS Santiago de Cuba

Bazaar, a resident of Massachusetts, was an immigrant from Chile who joined the Union Navy at New Bedford, Massachusetts. Bazaar was assigned to the USS Santiago de Cuba during the American Civil War. Santiago de Cuba was a wooden, brigantine-rigged, side-wheel steamship under the command of Rear Admiral David D. Porter.

In the later part of 1864, Union General Ulysses S. Grant ordered an assault on Fort Fisher, a stronghold of the Confederate States of America. It protected the vital trading routes of Wilmington's port, at North Carolina. Rear Admiral Porter was in charge of the naval assault and General Benjamin F. Butler was in charge of the land assault. After the failure of the first assault, Butler was replaced by Major General Alfred Terry. A second assault was ordered for January 1865. Bazaar was aboard the USS Santiago de Cuba and served in both assaults on the fort. On January 12, 1865, both ground and naval Union forces attempted the second assault. Bazaar and 5 other crew members, under the direct orders from Rear Admiral Porter, carried dispatches during the battle while under heavy fire from the Confederates to Major General Alfred Terry. Bazaar and his comrades were awarded the Medal of Honor for their actions.

== Medal of Honor citation ==
BAZAAR, PHILIP

Rank and organization: Ordinary Seaman, U.S. Navy Accredited to: Massachusetts Born: Chile, South America G.O. No.: 59, June 22, 1865 Citation: On board the U.S.S. Santiago de Cuba during the assault on Fort Fisher on 15 January 1865. As one of a boat crew detailed to one of the generals on shore, O.S. Bazaar bravely entered the fort in the assault and accompanied his party in carrying dispatches at the height of the battle. He was 1 of 6 men who entered the fort in the assault from the fleet.

== Awards and decorations ==
Bazaar's awards and decorations include the following:

Medal of Honor
(Navy version)

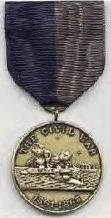
Navy Civil War Campaign Medal

== See also ==
- List of Hispanic Medal of Honor recipients
- List of American Civil War Medal of Honor recipients: A–F
- Hispanics in the American Civil War
- List of Medal of Honor recipients for the Second Battle of Fort Fisher
- Hispanics in the United States Navy
