= Kathlene Contres =

US Navy officer

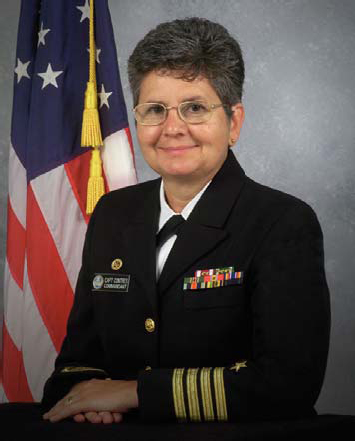
- Born: July 13, 1955 (age 71); Spangler, Pennsylvania, U.S.
- Military career
- Allegiance: United States of America
- Branch: United States Navy
- Service years: 1981–2010
- Rank: Captain
- Commands: Defense Equal Opportunity Management Institute
- Awards: Meritorious Service Medal with two gold stars Navy Commendation Medal with four gold stars Meritorious Unit Commendation with one gold star

Kathlene Contres (born July 13, 1955), is a former United States Navy captain who was the ranking female Hispanic American line officer on active duty. She was the Commandant of the Defense Equal Opportunity Management Institute (DEOMI), the first Latina woman and the thirteenth Commandant to lead the institute since it was established in 1971. Contres retired from the United States Navy on June 4, 2010, after 30 years of service. Contres also completed two terms as the president of the Association of Naval Services Officers (ANSO).

== Early life and education ==
Contres grew up in Spangler, Pennsylvania, where she received her primary and secondary education. Her grandfather Jesus Contreras, was a Mexican national who immigrated to the United States as a teenager. After migrating, he worked on the railroads, coal mines, and a paper mill. He eventually settled in York, Pennsylvania, and shortened his name to Jess Contres. She was born to Mr. and Mrs. John Contres who had six children, two daughters and four sons. Contres, at a young age, decided that she wanted to become a teacher. Upon her graduation from Ebensburg's Bishop Carroll High School in 1973, she enrolled in Slippery Rock University in Pennsylvania and in 1977 she earned her Bachelor of Science Degree in Health Education with an emphasis in Sports Medicine. Contres returned to her high school alma mater as a substitute teacher. She was teaching high school during the day and coaching the girls' basketball team during the evenings, as well as Athletic Training during other sports seasons. On one occasion she visited a friend at a United States Marine Corps base and was impressed with the institution's discipline. In 1980, she spoke to a Navy recruiter and became aware of the educational and travel opportunities which the Navy offered. Contres decided to enlist for four years of military service.

== Military career ==
Contres attended the Navy's Officer Candidate School in Newport, Rhode Island, where she underwent four months of officer training. Her training involved leadership and managerial courses as well as physical training. In February 1981, Contres was commissioned an ensign and assigned to the Naval Audiovisual Center in Washington, D.C. In 1983, Contres was promoted to lieutenant junior grade. During her Navy career she has held various assignments, among them the following:

In 1984, she was assigned to Naval Magazine in Guam, as the quality assurance and safety officer. She was responsible for both weapon and personnel safety. In 1985, she reported to the Commander in Chief, U.S. Pacific Fleet, Hawaii as the fleet retention officer. As fleet retention officer she tracked and reported retention trends for all Navy in the Pacific Fleet region. That same year she was promoted to lieutenant.

In 1986, Contres was reassigned to the Fleet Manpower Programming Office. There she was responsible for programming billets for all shore activities in the Pacific Fleet claimancy. In 1989, Captain Contres reported to Recruit Training Command in San Diego, California, where she served in various billets including Recruit Division Officer and Director of Apprenticeship Training Schools and in 1991 she was promoted to lieutenant commander. From 1992 to 1994, she was the officer in charge of Personnel Support Detachment, at the Naval Station Long Beach. During her service there, she led her group in earning a record number of customer service and personnel accountability awards. Contres then enrolled at San Diego State University and in 1995 earned her Master of Arts Degree in Educational Leadership. In 1994, Contres was assigned to the Chief of Naval Operations, Navy Training Directorate, in The Pentagon, leading the Shore Training Assessments Branch in providing the Navy's training needs analysis for preparation of the Navy Training Budget.

From 1997 to 2000, Contres, who was promoted to commander in 1996, became the commanding officer of the Navy Recruiting District in Buffalo, New York, overseeing Navy recruiting in New York and western Connecticut. Because of her recruiting successes she was selected for a follow-on tour at Navy Recruiting Headquarters in Millington, Tennessee, where she served as the Director of the Diversity Recruiting Programs and was responsible for reversing a declining trend in minority officer accessions and enlisted minority accessions to the highest attainment in four years.

In 2000, Contres was named director of the Service and Support Division (Pers-67)at the Navy Personnel Command, where they ensured consistent, comprehensive support for Navy personnel and their families. Among the programs she was responsible for were: Substance and Alcohol Abuse Prevention, Exceptional Family Member Program, Navy Voting Assistance Program, Suicide Prevention, Retiree Activities, Field Support Programs, and Equal Opportunity Programs. Contres holds subspecialties in Manpower, Personnel and Training, as well as Education and Training Management. In 2002, Contres was promoted to captain, becoming the highest-ranking female Hispanic line officer on active duty in the navy. The term line officer (or "officer of the line") is used in the United States Navy, Coast Guard and Marine Corps to describe a military officer who is trained to command a warship, ground combat unit or combat aviation unit.

== DEOMI ==
On March 18, 2005, Contres replaced CAPT Robert Watts as Commandant of the Defense Equal Opportunity Management Institute (DEOMI), located at Patrick Air Force Base near Coco Beach, Florida. Contres, became the first Hispanic woman and the thirteenth Commandant to lead the Institute since it was established. She oversees a joint-service school supporting all Department of Defense and U.S. Coast Guard equal opportunity and equal employment opportunity (EO/ EEO) program and research requirements.

The Department of Defense (DoD) established the Defense Equal Opportunity Management Institute, originally chartered as the Defense Race Relations Institute, in 1971 in response to recommendations from an inter-service task force examining the causes of racial turmoil on military installations and aboard ships. In its early years, the Institute trained military members and DoD civilians to lead mandatory seminars on race and human relations issues throughout the military departments to improve mission readiness.

She was responsible for maintaining the $24 million compound of the Institute and training more than 2,500 students annually from military bases around the world. Under Contres' leadership the Institute had a successful re-accreditation overseen by the Council on Occupational Education, a rigorous re-write of all curriculum using the Instructional System Design process and the roll-out of a new DEOMI on-line survey utilized by the Military Services to assess the organizational climate of their units.

On June 4, 2010, Contres retired from the United States Navy. She was honored for her service during a change of command and retirement ceremony presided by Rear Admiral Joseph R. Castillo, commander, Eleventh Coast Guard District, and held at DEOMI in the Major General Lucius Theus Auditorium. Captain Contres was succeeded by Mr. Ronald M. Joe.

== ANSO ==
Contres served two terms as president of the Association of Naval Service Officers (ANSO), an organization that fosters the advancement and recognition of Hispanic officers in the uniformed naval services. Her achievements as president include the creation of the group's first-ever strategic plan; revamping the membership program in ways that tripled annual memberships and doubled the life memberships; more than tripling the attendance at the annual Professional Development and Training Symposium; developing a Speakers Bureau; and quadrupling the number of local chapters.

== Hispanic recruitment advocate ==
Contres is an advocate of Hispanic recruitment for the navy. Whenever she addresses a group of Hispanics (Latinas) she always stresses the possibilities for advancement and self-improvement that the navy offers. She has been quoted as saying:

"The Navy is really big on education,” “We have scholarships that basically give college students a paycheck if they get good grades, and allow them to start accruing their years of service towards retirement."

In 2007, Contres, who currently resides in Melbourne, Florida, was the recipient of the prestigious HENAAC Santiago Rodriguez Diversity Award. HENAAC (Hispanic Engineer National Achievement Awards Conference), is a national non-profit educational organization promoting careers in science, technology, engineering and math, has been honoring and documenting the contributions of Hispanic Americans since 1989. The winners in each current category represent the nation's best and brightest. They were selected by an independent group of representatives from industry, government, military and academia.

She is a member, serving on two sub-committees, of the congressionally mandated Military Leadership and Diversity Commission. Since 2000, she has been a member of the Deputy Assistant Secretary of the Navy (Civilian Human Resources) Advisory Council on Hispanic Employment.

== Awards and recognitions ==
Her awards and recognitions include the following:

- 2003, The Society of Mexican American Engineers & Scientists Medalla de Oro
- 2203, The Society of Hispanic Professional Engineers President's Award
- The Association of Naval Services Officers (ANSO) Leadership Award.
- 2005, Las Primeras Award from MANA, A National Latina Organization
- 2005, Leadership Award from Latina Style magazine
- One of Hispanic Business Magazine's 20 Elite Women for 2006
- 2007, HENAAC Santiago Rodriguez Diversity Award
- 2007, Woman of the Year for the Mexican American Opportunity Foundation

== Military decorations ==
- Legion of Merit Medal
- Meritorious Service Medal with two gold stars (3 awards)
- Navy Commendation Medal with four gold stars (5 awards)
- Meritorious Unit Commendation with one gold star (2 awards)
- GWOT Service Medal
- National Defense Service Medal with one gold star (2 awards)
- Foreign Overseas Ribbon
- Navy Recruiting Ribbon with one gold star (2 awards)
- Navy pistol Expert

Badges

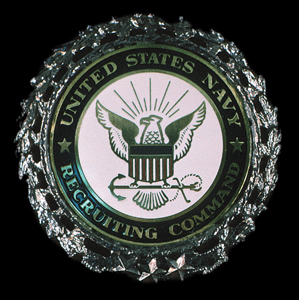
- Navy Recruiting Gold Wreath for Recruiting Excellence with 9 stars

== See also ==
- Hispanics in the United States Navy
