= George Farragut =

Spanish American naval officer (1755 – 1817)

- Jorge Farragut Mesquida
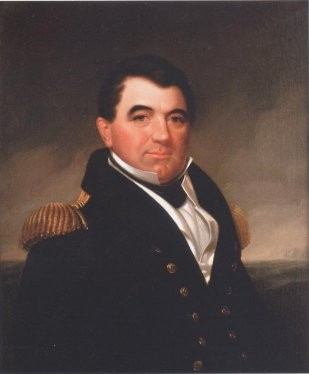
- Portrait of George Farragut attributed to William Swain, Smithsonian Institution, National Museum of American History
- Born: September 29 or 30, 1755; Ciutadella, Menorca, Kingdom of Great Britain (now Spain)
- Died: June 4, 1817 (aged 61); Pascagoula, Mississippi
- Children: Five, including David Farragut
- Military career
- Allegiance: Continental Army; South Carolina Navy
- Conflicts: Siege of Charleston (captured); Battle of Cowpens

Jordi Farragut Mesquida, anglicized as George Farragut (born September 29 or September 30, 1755 – June 4, 1817), was a Spanish American naval officer, born in Ciutadella de Menorca, then under British occupation. He fought during the American Revolutionary War and with the Continental Army in battles in the South. After commanding a Spanish trading ship in the Gulf of Mexico and Caribbean, he had joined the South Carolina Navy as a lieutenant when the war broke out. He anglicized his Catalan name when he joined the South Carolina Navy.

== Early life ==
Jordi Farragut Mesquida was born to Antoni Farragut and Joana Mesquida in Ciutadella on the island of Menorca (an overseas territory of the Kingdom of Great Britain between 1708 and 1782, now part of Spain). He first went to sea at the age of 10, and left Menorca as a young man to join the Spanish merchant marine after studies in the Barcelona School of nautical studies. He fought in the Russo-Turkish Wars with the Russian Navy against the Ottoman Navy at the battle of Chesma in 1770. He commanded a small vessel that traded goods between Veracruz (today Mexico) and New Orleans (Spanish Louisiana) which were both under Spanish rule as New Spain at the time, and ports in the Caribbean, namely Havana, Cuba.

== American War of Independence ==
He joined his new country at the beginning of the American Revolution, initially as a lieutenant in the South Carolina Navy, and anglicized his first name to George. Farragut fought the British at Savannah and was captured in the Siege of Charleston in 1780. Farragut's left arm was broken by a cannonball during the fighting in Charlestown. After being released in a prisoner exchange, he fought as a volunteer at the Battle of Cowpens and at Wilmington. He was described by his contemporary George W. Siever "as a short, chunky man; very brave and a funny genius."

North Carolina service record:

- NC State Regiment: 1782–1783, On May 1, 1782, he was selected as a major over the units of Light Horse within the North Carolina State Regiment. His unit was disbanded in January 1783.

== Marriage and family ==
After the war, Farragut married Scotch-Irish American Elizabeth Shine (1765–1808) from North Carolina. They moved west to Knox County, Tennessee, where their son David Farragut (born James Glasgow Farragut) was born in 1801. They had several children.

After President Thomas Jefferson bought the Louisiana territory, people were needed to staff the new U.S. port at New Orleans. Many residents of the former French and Spanish city distrusted anglos; Jefferson's policy favored staffing New Orleans with officials who spoke French or Spanish. East Tennessee native William C. C. Claiborne, a good friend of Farragut's, became the new territory's first U.S. governor. His recommendation of Farragut resulted in the offer of a new job. His son James, who would grow up to become Admiral David Farragut, was born in 1801. In 1805, Farragut moved to New Orleans, and his family followed, in a 1,700-mile flatboat adventure aided by hired rivermen, the young James Farragut's first voyage.

The family was still living in New Orleans in 1808. There Farragut met David Porter Sr., another navy officer who had served in the Revolution and was living with his son, also named David Porter, on active duty with the Navy as an officer. The senior Porter was brought to their house one day suffering from sunstroke, and, despite Elizabeth's care, he died. The same day, Elizabeth died of yellow fever. George, age 53, made plans to place his young children with friends and family who could better care for them.

He was visited by the younger Porter, who thanked him for his wife's care of his father and expressed sympathy for his loss. Porter offered to adopt James and introduce him to a career in the Navy. James and his father agreed. Soon after, George Farragut bought a large piece of property outside of town on the Pascagoula River in Mississippi, and spent his final years there.

== Death ==
Jordi Farragut Mesquida died in Pascagoula, Mississippi, on June 4, 1817, at age 62 of yellow fever.

== See also ==
- Hispanics in the United States Navy
