= John Ortega =

United States Navy Medal of Honor recipient (1840-?)

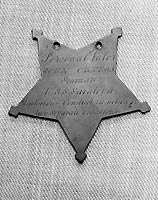
- Reverse of the "Medal of Honor" awarded to U.S. Navy Seaman John Ortega, who was the first Hispanic sailor to be awarded the United States' highest military decoration for valor in combat. He distinguished himself, during the South Atlantic Blockade, by the Union Naval forces, during the American Civil War.
- Born: Juan Ortega; 1840; Spain
- Died: Unknown
- Military career
- Allegiance: United States of America; Union
- Branch: Union Navy
- Service years: 1863 - 1865
- Rank: Master's Mate
- Unit: USS Saratoga
- Conflicts: American Civil War South Atlantic Blockade
- Awards: Medal of Honor; Civil War Campaign Medal

John (Juan) Ortega (born in 1840), was the first Spanish sailor to be awarded the United States' highest military decoration for valor in combat — the Medal of Honor. He distinguished himself, during the South Atlantic Blockade, by the Union Naval forces, during the American Civil War.

== Biography ==
Ortega (birth name Juan Ortega) was born in Spain and immigrated to the United States. He became a resident of Pennsylvania. In 1863, he joined the Union Navy stationed in Pennsylvania, his adopted home state.

Ortega was assigned to USS Saratoga during the American Civil War. The Saratoga, commissioned in 1843, was the third ship of the United States Navy christened with that name. It was a sloop-of-war under the command of Commander George Musalas Colvocoresses.

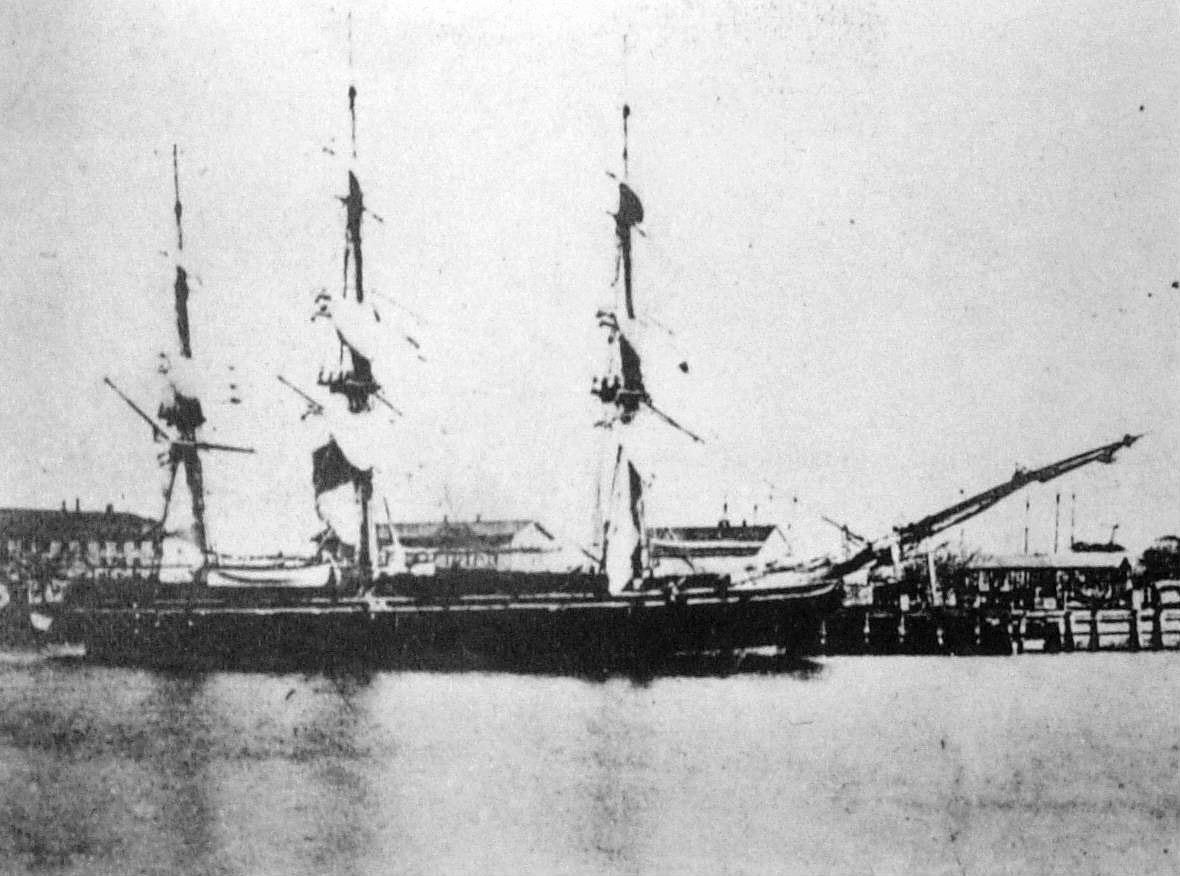
USS Saratoga

On January 13, 1864, Secretary of the United States Navy Gideon Welles, ordered Commander Colvocoresses and USS Saratoga to proceed to Charleston, South Carolina, and report to Rear Admiral Dahlgren for duty in the South Atlantic Blockading Squadron in what is known as the Union blockade. This was a massive effort by the Union Navy to prevent the passage of trade goods, supplies, and arms to and from the Confederate States.

Ortega was a member of the landing parties from the ship who made several raids in August and September which resulted in the capture of many prisoners and the taking or destruction of substantial quantities of ordnance, ammunition, and supplies. A number of buildings, bridges, and salt works were destroyed during the expedition.

For his actions Seaman John Ortega was awarded the Medal of Honor and promoted to acting master's mate in August 1864. He deserted from the Navy in June 1865.

== Medal of Honor citation ==
ORTEGA, JOHN
Rank and organization: Seaman, U.S. Navy
Accredited To: Pennsylvania
Born: 1840, Spain
G.O. No.: 45, December 31, 1864
Citation:

Served as seaman on board the U.S.S. Saratoga during actions of that vessel on 2 occasions. Carrying out his duties courageously during these actions, Ortega conducted himself gallantly through both periods. Promoted to acting master's mate.

== Awards and decorations ==
Ortega's awards and decorations include the following:

Medal of Honor
(Navy version)

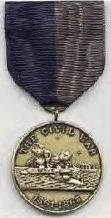
Navy Civil War Campaign Medal

== See also ==
- List of Hispanic Medal of Honor recipients
- List of Medal of Honor recipients
- List of American Civil War Medal of Honor recipients: M–P
- Hispanics in the American Civil War
- Hispanics in the United States Navy
