= Cipriano Andrade =

United States Navy admiral (1840–1911)

Cipriano Andrade Cipriano Andrade
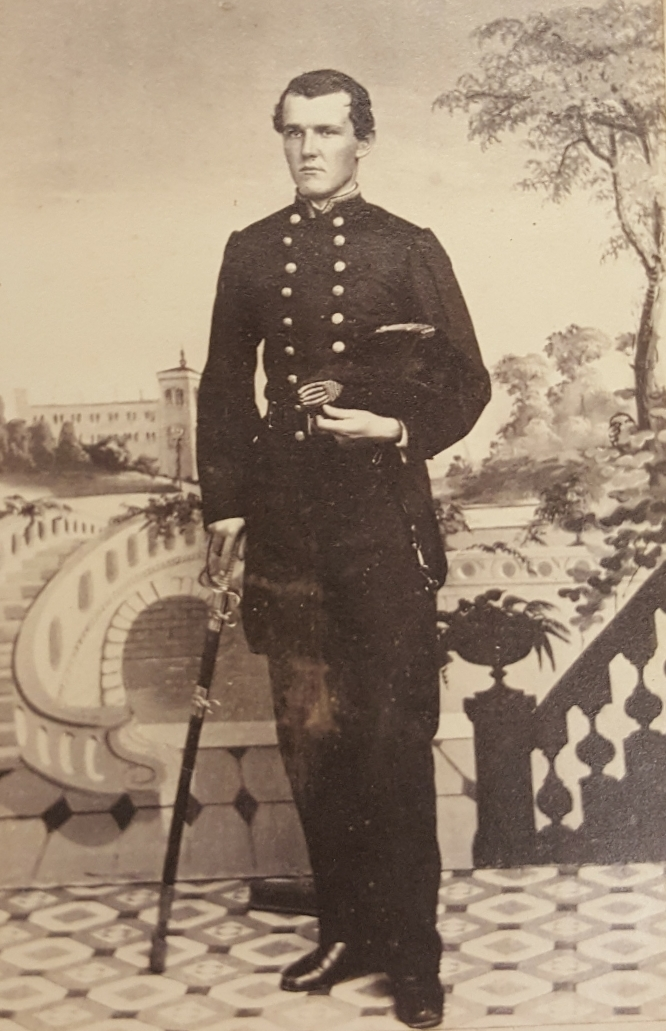
- Cipriano Andrade, Rear Admiral, U.S. Navy
- Born: September 1, 1840; Tampico, Tamaulipas, Mexico
- Died: June 18, 1911 (aged 70); South Norwalk, Connecticut
- Burial place: Arlington National Cemetery
- Military career
- Branch: United States Navy
- Rank: Rear admiral

Cipriano Andrade (September 1, 1840 – June 18, 1911) was born in Tampico, Tamaulipas, Mexico. He served in the United States Navy for forty years and attained the rank of rear admiral. He died in South Norwalk, Connecticut.

== Early life and education ==
Andrade was born in Tampico, Tamaulipas, Mexico, on September 1, 1840. He attended public and private schools in Philadelphia, Pennsylvania. He studied engineering at the Franklin Institute.

== Military career ==
He entered the naval service as a third assistant engineer July 1, 1861. During the Civil War, he served on board the USS Lancaster, August 1861 – October 1863. He was promoted to second assistant engineer on December 18, 1862. He served on board the USS Pontiac December 1863 to June 1865. He was promoted to first assistant engineer on January 30, 1865, serving on various station and on various vessels of the Navy.

He was promoted to chief engineer on September 1, 1881, serving on board the USS Ashuelot until November 1881. He served as inspector of coal at Philadelphia, Pennsylvania, from July 1882 to February 1884. He served on board the USS Yantic from February 1884 to October 1885. He served on board the USS Swatara from October 1885 to October 1886. He was then assigned special duty at Philadelphia, Pennsylvania, from August 1887 to April 1889.

He served on board the USS Yorktown from April 1889 to September 1891. He then was assigned Inspector of machinery for the USS Columbia from September 1891 to April 1894. He served on board the USS Columbia from April 1894 to January 1895. Andrade attained the relative rank of commander September 12, 1894. He served on board the USS New York, January 1895 to April 1897; board duty at Philadelphia, Pennsylvania, May 1897 to May 1898; attained the rank of captain February 7, 1898. During the Spanish–American War he served on duty with the Interior Coast Defense System from May 1898 to July 1898. Andrade was assigned to duty to examine vessels at Santiago, Cuba, in July 1898, and completed that duty in August, 1898. He was as a member of the board of inspection and survey for the Navy Department in Washington, D.C. October 1898 to July 1901, this being his last active duty.

His title was changed by law to captain March 3, 1899, and July 1, 1901, he was transferred to the retired list of the Navy with the rank of rear admiral, on his own application after the completion of 40 years of service.

== Personal life ==
Andrade married Annie A. Berry on June 1, 1870. He died at South Norwalk, Connecticut, on June 18, 1911 and was buried at Arlington National Cemetery, in Arlington, Virginia.
