= USS Waldron =

Allen M. Sumner-class destroyer

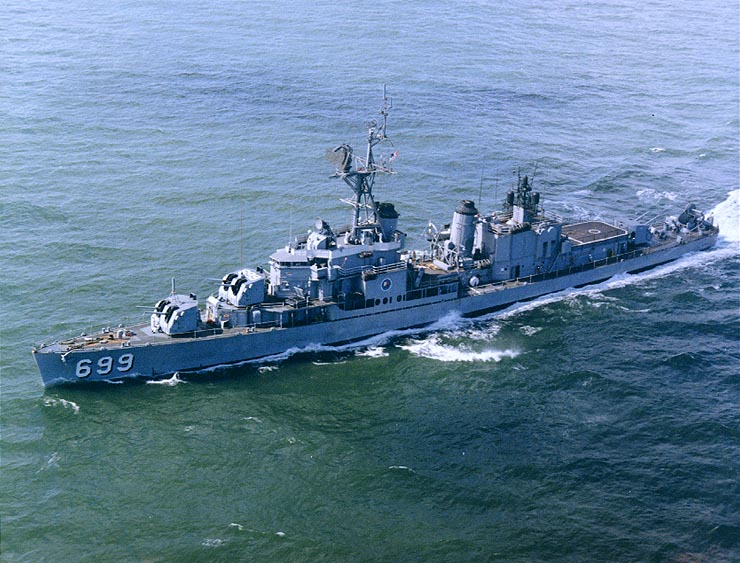
- Waldron in 1964 following her FRAM II modernization

History

United States
- Name: USS Waldron
- Namesake: John C. Waldron
- Builder: Federal Shipbuilding and Drydock Company
- Laid down: 16 November 1943
- Launched: 26 March 1944
- Sponsored by: Miss Nancy Waldron
- Commissioned: 7 June 1944
- Decommissioned: 30 October 1973
- Stricken: 31 October 1973
- Identification: DD-699
- Fate: Sold to Colombia 30 October 1973

Colombia
- Name: ARC Santander
- Acquired: 30 October 1973
- Stricken: Stricken in 1986
- Identification: DD-03
- Fate: Scrapped in 1986

General characteristics
- Class & type: Allen M. Sumner-class destroyer
- Displacement: 2,200 tons
- Length: 376 ft 6 in (114.76 m)
- Beam: 40 ft (12 m)
- Draft: 15 ft 8 in (4.78 m)
- Propulsion: 60,000 shp (45,000 kW); 2 propellers
- Speed: 34 knots (63 km/h; 39 mph)
- Range: 6,500 nautical miles (12,000 km; 7,500 mi) at 15 knots (28 km/h; 17 mph)
- Complement: 336
- Armament: 6 × 5 in (130 mm)/38 guns, 12 × 40 mm AA guns, 11 × 20 mm AA guns, 10 × 21 inch (533 mm) torpedo tubes, 6 × depth charge projectors, 2 × depth charge tracks

USS Waldron (DD-699), an Allen M. Sumner-class destroyer, was the only ship of the United States Navy to be named for John C. Waldron, a U.S. Naval aviator who led a squadron of torpedo bombers in World War II.

== Construction and commissioning ==
Waldron was laid down on 16 November 1943 at Kearny, New Jersey, by the Federal Shipbuilding & Drydock Co.; launched on 26 March 1944; sponsored by Miss Nancy Waldron; and commissioned at the New York Navy Yard on 7 June 1944.

== United States service history ==
=== World War II: 1944 ===
Waldron conducted shakedown in the vicinity of Bermuda during the early summer of 1944. She conducted post-shakedown availability at New York from 22 July until 6 August and then headed back to the Bermuda area for further training. The destroyer returned to New York in mid-September but got underway again on 26 September. Steaming via the Delaware capes, the warship arrived at the Panama Canal on 1 October. She transited the canal that same day and reported for duty with the Pacific Fleet. She departed Balboa on 4 October, stopped at San Pedro, California, from 12 to 14 October, and arrived at Pearl Harbor on 20 October. She remained in the Hawaiian Islands until 17 December, at which time she got underway for the western Pacific. She arrived at Ulithi lagoon on 28 December and reported for duty in the screen of the Fast Carrier Task Force (TF-38/58).

=== World War II: 1945 ===
Waldron spent her entire World War II service with the fast aircraft carriers. She departed Ulithi with TF 38 on 30 December and protected the carriers while they launched their planes against enemy installations on 3 and 4 January 1945. On 6–7 January, her charges' aircraft pummeled targets on the island of Luzon. Both raids were part of the preparations for the amphibious assault on Luzon carried out at Lingayen Gulf on 9 January. While the troops stormed ashore there, however, Waldron and the carriers had returned north to suppress enemy air power on Formosa during the actual assault. That same day, she steamed through Bashi Channel into the South China Sea with TF 38 to begin a series of raids on Japan's inner defenses. First on the agenda came Cam Ranh Bay in Indochina, where Admiral Halsey hoped to find battleships Ise and Hyūga. Unknown to the American fleet, however, was the fact that the two Japanese warships had moved south to safer waters at Singapore. The raids went forward anyhow on 12 January, and the naval aviators still managed to rack up a stupendous score: 44 ships sunk, 15 of which were Japanese combatants and the remainder being merchant ships. After fueling on 13 January, TF 38, with Waldron still in the screen, carried out air attacks on Hainan Island and on Hong Kong. The following day, the planes of TF 38 returned to Formosa for antishipping sweeps and attacks on the Formosa airfields.

On 16 January, the carriers launched their planes against Hainan and Hong Kong once more. Late on 20 January, Waldron the antimine and antisubmarine patrol—led TF 38 out of the South China Sea through Balintang Channel and into the Philippine Sea. The destroyer and her charges returned to their base at Ulithi on the 26th after conducting strikes on Formosa and on Okinawa.

Waldron remained at Ulithi until 10 February at which time she got underway again with TF 58, this time to support the assault on Iwo Jima scheduled for the 19th. As a part of that support, the carriers planned to carry out the first carrier-based air strikes on Japan since the Doolittle Raid of 1942. On 16 and 17 February, the carriers of TF 58 sent their aircraft aloft for raids on the Tokyo area of Honshū. The task force then began its retirement to Iwo Jima, there to provide air support for the following day's invasion.

On the night of 17 and 18 February, Waldron's task group encountered several small Japanese patrol craft. One of the craft attacked Dortch with her 3-inch guns, killing three of the destroyer's crewmen. Due to darkness and the proximity of Dortch and Charles S. Sperry, Waldron could not bring her battery to bear. Instead, she laid on a course for the enemy craft and charged her at 21 knots (39 km/h; 24 mph). At about 0509 on 18 February, Waldron rammed the Japanese picket boat amidships and cut her neatly in two. About four hours later, the destroyer received orders detaching her from TF 58 to head for Saipan and repairs to her bow.

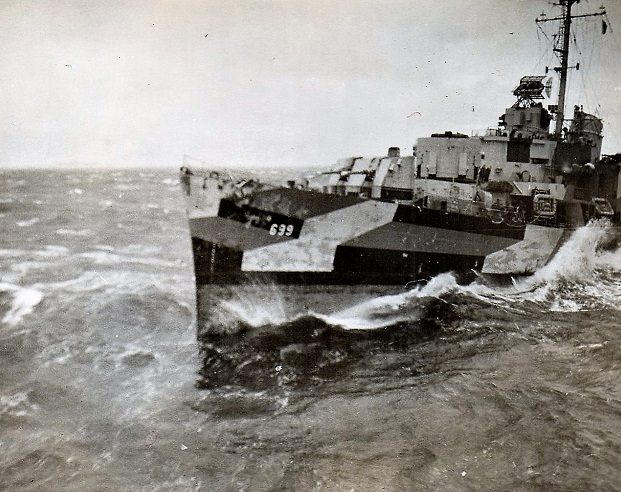
Waldron off Okinawa, in April–May 1945.

The warship arrived at Saipan on 20 February, completed repairs quickly, and departed Saipan in the afternoon of 23 February. Upon arrival off Iwo Jima on 25 February, Waldron reported to TF 51 for temporary duty with the transport screen. During that assignment, she also provided naval gunfire support for the troops operating ashore on 26 and 27 February. On 27 February, the destroyer rejoined the screen of TG 58.3. After an air strike on Okinawa on 1 March, she headed back to Ulithi with the carriers, arriving there on 4 March.

Ten days later, Waldron exited the lagoon once again on her way back to the Japanese home islands with the fast carriers. She arrived in Japanese home waters on 18 March, and the carriers began launching strikes on Kyushu airfields that same day. Later that day, the enemy counterattacked with kamikazes and succeeded in hitting the aircraft carrier Franklin. Waldron was one of the ships assigned to cover the severely damaged carrier during the initial stage of her retirement from action. Antiaircraft action continued throughout the three days Waldron provided escort for Franklin; and, on the night of 20 and 21 March, the destroyer scored a kill of her own when her radar-directed main battery brought down a Japanese Yokosuka D4Y "Judy." She took another intruder under fire briefly that night, but technical problems prevented a second kill. On 22 March, she rejoined the main carrier force and resumed her screening duties while the planes struck at Okinawa and Kyushu in preparation for the invasion of Okinawa.

For the next three months, Waldron continued to screen the carriers during their support missions for the Okinawa campaign. During that time, she was engaged in a number of antiaircraft actions and participated in two shore bombardments of air installations on Minami Daito Shima. The one antiaircraft action which resulted in a definite kill for the destroyer occurred on 14 May, although she claimed four sure assists in addition during that period. On 26 May, she cleared the Ryukyu Islands with her task group and, on 1 June, arrived at San Pedro Bay, Leyte, for a much-needed availability. The destroyer remained at San Pedro Bay until 1 July at which time she returned to sea with TF 38.

For the remainder of World War II, she steamed with the fast carriers during the final strikes on the Japanese home islands. The 15 August cessation of hostilities found her still off the Japanese coast in company with TF 38. She screened the carriers while their aircraft covered the initial occupation of Japan. That duty lasted until 10 September, at which time she finally entered Tokyo Bay.

=== Post-World War II ===
During the immediate postwar period, Waldron remained in the Far East in support of American occupation forces. In addition to Japan, she visited Saipan, Eniwetok, and Okinawa during the repatriation of Japanese—both military and civilian—back to Japan. On 4 November, she departed Okinawa, bound for home. After stops at Eniwetok and Pearl Harbor, the warship arrived at San Francisco on 20 January 1946. From there, she moved to Portland, Oregon, whence she departed on 4 February. The destroyer transited the Panama Canal on 14 February and arrived in Norfolk, Virginia on 19 February.

Waldron operated along the east coast of the United States for about three months. Early in May, she began an extended repair period at the Boston Naval Shipyard and did not return to active service until the end of the year. During the first few months of 1947, the destroyer operated out of Charleston, South Carolina; but, by June, she had been reassigned to New Orleans. For the next two years, she cruised the waters of the Gulf of Mexico and the West Indies as a training platform for reservists of the 8th Naval District. In August 1949, she made a visit to Norfolk, before getting underway for a deployment to European waters on 6 September. During the first part of that deployment, Waldron cruised northern European waters visiting British and western European ports. Midway through November, however, she transited the Straits of Gibraltar and entered the Mediterranean Sea. She cruised the length and breadth of the Mediterranean, making a number of port visits, until 28 January 1950 when she retransited the Straits of Gibraltar. She arrived back in Norfolk on 7 February but remained only until 16 February on which day she made the brief voyage to Charleston. Following pre-inactivation overhaul, Waldron was decommissioned on 17 May 1950 and was berthed with the Charleston Group, Atlantic Reserve Fleet.

=== Korean War ===
Less than six weeks later, however, events in the Far East transpired which brought her back into active service before the end of the year. On 25 June, the forces of communist North Korea invaded the Republic of Korea to the south. The compelling need to send most available active combat ships to the Far East to support the United States and United Nations commitment to help the South Koreans meant that many others in reserve had to be reactivated to take their places. Accordingly, the decision to reactivate Waldron came on 17 August, just three months after her decommissioning.

On 20 November 1950, Waldron was recommissioned at Charleston. She conducted shakedown training out of Guantanamo Bay, Cuba, from December 1950 to March 1951. After post-shakedown availability at Charleston, she moved to her new home port, Norfolk, in August. In September, she departed Norfolk for a 10-week cruise to northern European waters before entering the Mediterranean for duty with the 6th Fleet. Early in February 1952, the destroyer returned to Norfolk and resumed 2nd Fleet operations from that base.

During the summer of 1952, Waldron voyaged to Europe once more with Naval Academy midshipmen embarked for their summer training cruise. She completed that voyage in September and returned to Atlantic Fleet duty out of Norfolk. In March 1953, the warship began an overhaul at the Charleston Naval Shipyard. She completed repairs in June and conducted refresher training in the Guantanamo Bay operating area before resuming normal operations out of Norfolk at the end of the month.

On 2 November, the destroyer departed Norfolk for a tour of duty in the Far East. She transited the Panama Canal on the 9th and continued her voyage west. She stopped at Pearl Harbor along the way and arrived in Yokosuka, Japan, on 9 December. Her duty in the Orient took her to Japanese and Korean ports, and she served as a unit of the United Nations security forces on patrol in the wake of the cessation of hostilities in Korea the previous summer. That assignment lasted until 7 April 1954, at which time she departed Sasebo for home. Steaming via Hong Kong, Singapore, Ceylon, the Suez Canal, the Mediterranean Sea, and the Atlantic Ocean, Waldron completed a circumnavigation of the globe at Norfolk on 4 June.

=== 1954–1967 ===
In July, the ship resumed normal operations along the east coast and in the West Indies. That duty continued until the spring of 1956. On 1 April, she stood out of Chesapeake Bay on her way to the Mediterranean for her second tour of duty with the 6th Fleet.

Over the next decade, Waldron alternated operations out of Norfolk with a series of deployments to the 6th Fleet in the "middle sea." In June 1959, the ship entered the Great Lakes for Operation Inland Seas, a celebration honoring the opening of the St. Lawrence Seaway. In June 1962, the destroyer began a fleet rehabilitation and modernization (FRAM) overhaul at the Norfolk Naval Shipyard to update her antisubmarine capabilities. At the conclusion of those alterations, the warship returned to normal operations and completed her decade of deployments and duty in home waters.

=== Vietnam War ===
The summer of 1967, however, brought a different, though by no means new, type of assignment—duty in the Far East. On 5 July 1967, she stood out of Norfolk, bound for the Panama Canal. The destroyer transited the canal on 10 July. After stops at San Diego and Pearl Harbor, she arrived in Yokosuka on 10 August. She departed Yokosuka on 13 August and, after stops at Okinawa and Subic Bay, arrived in Vietnamese waters on 24 August. Patrolling near the 17th parallel, she provided gunfire support for the III Marine Amphibious Force (MAF) during operations ashore during the Vietnam War. That first line period lasted until 17 September when she got underway for a port visit to Kaohsiung, Taiwan. She stopped at Kaohsiung from 20 September to 1 October and then moved on to Hong Kong, which port she visited between 2 and 6 October.

On 9 October, she resumed naval gunfire support duties in Vietnamese waters, this time off the coast of the II Corps tactical zone. During her second tour on the gunline, Waldron's main battery supported troops of the Army's 1st Air Cavalry Division and of the South Vietnamese 40th Division. On 20 October, she concluded her assignments on the gunline and headed for Yankee Station to join the fast carriers of TF 77. Two days later, she rendezvoused with Task Group (TG) 77.8 for two weeks of planeguard duty with the carriers. She departed the war zone again on 3 November and, after a stop at Okinawa, arrived in Yokosuka on 8 November.

A week later, she headed back to Yankee Station with TG 77.8 but parted company with the group on the 18th for a stop at Subic Bay. Waldron returned to Vietnamese waters on 24 November and took up naval gunfire support duties once again off the coast of the II Corps zone. That assignment endured until 10 December when she cleared the war zone for the last time. She made a stop at Subic Bay and then arrived in Yokosuka on 22 December.

=== 1968–1973 ===
Four days later, the destroyer set out for the United States. After stops at Midway and Pearl Harbor, she arrived in San Francisco on 9 January 1968. From there, she headed via San Diego to the Panama Canal which she transited on 25 January. Waldron reentered Norfolk on 30 January. Over the next two years, the destroyer resumed her schedule of Atlantic coast operations alternated with two more deployments to the Mediterranean.

On 1 April 1970, Waldron was reassigned to Naval Reserve training under the control of the Commandant, 6th Naval District. Her new home port was Mayport, Florida. She arrived there on 7 May 1970 and began cruises along the Florida coast and in the West Indies training reservists. That duty lasted until the fall of 1973.

=== Decommissioning ===
On 30 October 1973, Waldron was decommissioned at Mayport. She was simultaneously transferred, by sale, to the Colombian Navy. Her name was struck from the Navy List on 31 October 1973.

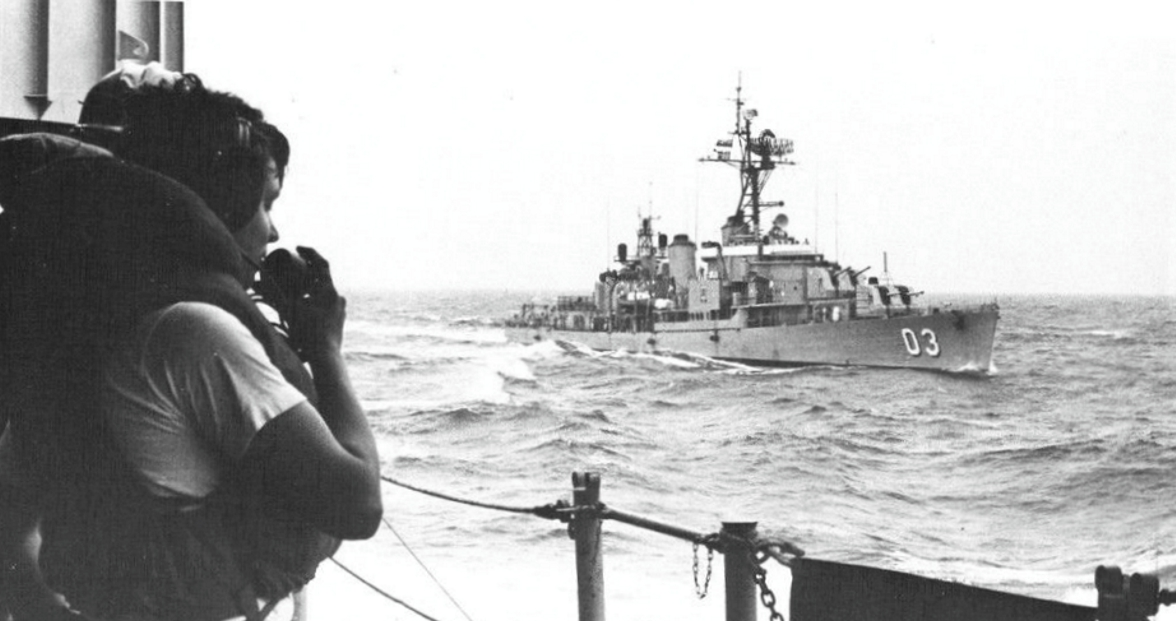
ARC Santander (DD-03), in 1974.

== Colombian Navy ==
In Colombia, she was commissioned as ARC Santander (DD-03). Santander was stricken and scrapped in 1986.

== Honors and awards ==
Waldron earned four battle stars during World War II and one battle star for service during the Vietnam War
