= Patrick H. Brady (Navy) =

United States Navy rear admiral

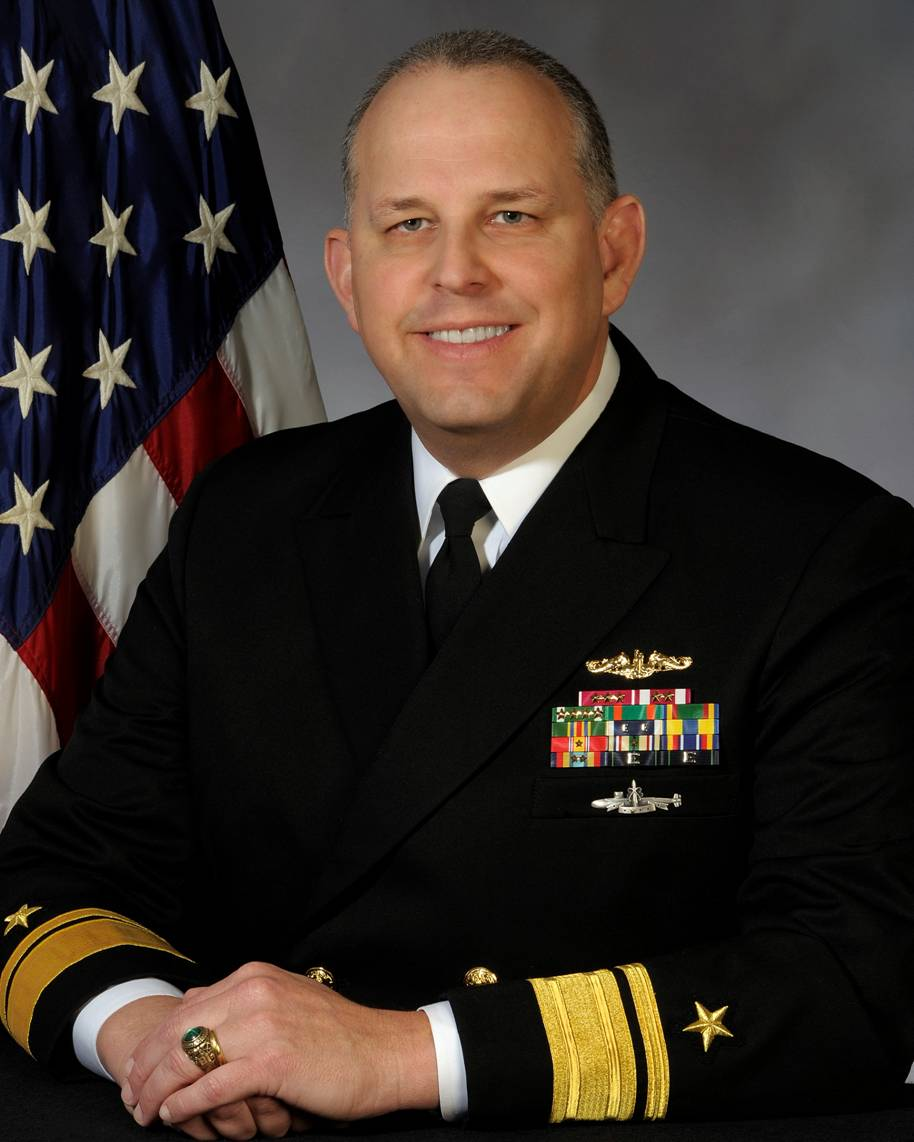
- Rear Admiral Patrick H. Brady
- Born: 1959 (age 66–67); San Antonio, Texas, U.S.
- Military career
- Allegiance: United States of America
- Branch: United States Navy
- Service years: 1981–2014
- Rank: Rear admiral
- Commands: Space and Naval Warfare Systems Command; Naval Undersea Warfare Center
- Awards: Legion of Merit (2 awards); Meritorious Service Medal (3 awards)

Patrick Hahler Brady (born 1959) is a retired United States Navy rear admiral who in July 2007 became the first person of Hispanic descent to be named commander of the Naval Undersea Warfare Center. At the time, he was one of four admirals of Hispanic descent who were serving in the United States Navy. He later served four years as head of the Space and Naval Warfare Systems Command.

== Early years ==
Brady was born in San Antonio, Texas. In 1966, Brady's father, a former United States Army soldier of Irish-American and Hispanic descent was offered a position at NASA Headquarters in Washington, D.C. in the procurement field and the family moved to Camp Springs, Maryland. There he received his primary and secondary education. In 1977, Brady received his appointment to the United States Naval Academy from U.S. Congresswoman Marjorie Sewell Holt upon his graduation from Crossland High School.

== Military career ==
During his four years at the academy, Brady belonged to the wrestling team, where he excelled as an athlete. In 1981, Brady earned a Bachelor of Science in ocean engineering degree and was commissioned an ensign. He underwent Navy Nuclear Power training in 1982. In 1983, Brady was promoted to lieutenant junior grade and served aboard the USS Lewis and Clark (SSBN-644), a Benjamin Franklin-class ballistic missile submarine, until 1985 the same year which he was promoted to lieutenant. He was reassigned in 1986 to the USS Omaha (SSN-692), a Los Angeles-class submarine, until 1989 when he was assigned to serve aboard the USS San Francisco (SSN-711), a Los Angeles-class nuclear attack submarine. In 1991, Brady was promoted to lieutenant commander and in 1992 earned his Master of Arts in national security affairs degree from the Naval Postgraduate School. From 1993 to 1995, he served on the USS Drum (SSN-677), a nuclear attack submarine.

In 1995, Brady was on the staff of Commander Submarine Force, of the U.S. Pacific Fleet as a member of the Tactical Readiness Evaluation Team. During this period he undertook courses from the Air Force Command and Staff College via correspondence.

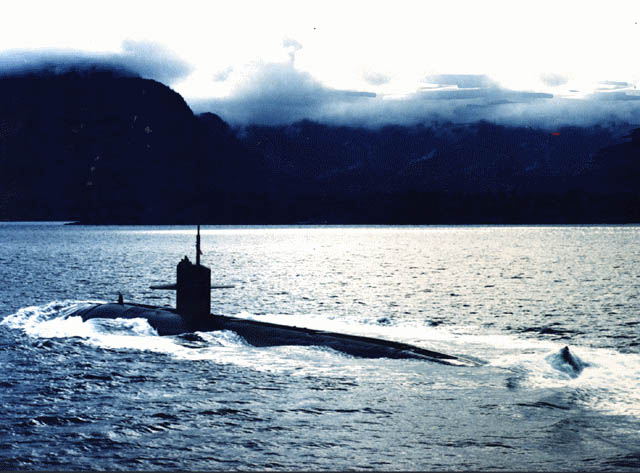
USS Portsmouth

In 1997, Brady was promoted to the rank of commander, and he served as the commanding officer of the USS Portsmouth (SSN-707), a Los Angeles-class nuclear attack submarine. Under his command, the Portsmouth under his leadership received various recognitions. Among the recognition's received after completing a Western Pacific Deployment were the COMSUBPAC (Commander, Submarine (forces), Pacific (Ocean)) Silver Anchor Award and the Squadron Battle Efficiency, Engineering, Navigation, Communications and Damage Control Awards. Brady served aboard the USS Postsmouth until August 2000 when he became a member of the Acquisition Professional Corps.

As a member of the Acquisition Professional Corps, he served in various positions, among them Deputy Design Manager and Warfare Requirements Manager; Program Manager for the Virginia Class Submarine Program Office; Major Program Manager for Submarine Combat and Weapons Control Program Office; Executive Assistant to the Commander, Naval Sea Systems Command; and the Major Program Manager for Advanced Undersea Systems. During this period of time Brady received Level Three acquisition training and in 2002 a promotion to captain.

On April 27, 2007, Secretary of Defense Robert M. Gates announced that President George W. Bush had nominated Brady for the rank of rear admiral. Upon his promotion to rear admiral (lower half), Brady joined rear admirals Albert Garcia, Will Rodriguez and George E. Mayer as one of the four admirals of Hispanic descent who are currently serving in the United States Navy. In July of that same year he became the 44th commander of the Naval Undersea Warfare Center. According to his official naval biography he is responsible for the Navy's full-spectrum research, development, test and evaluation, engineering and fleet support center for submarines, autonomous underwater systems, and offensive and defensive weapons systems associated with undersea warfare.

Brady assumed command of the Space and Naval Warfare Systems Command (SPAWAR) in August 2010. He served in this position until August 2014.

== Motivational speaker ==
Brady and Clarise, his wife, have two children, Ashley and Andrew. He has been the motivational keynote speaker in various Hispanic related conferences. According to Brady, one of his passions with his involvement with Hispanic organizations, such as HENAAC and MAES, is to ensure that other Hispanics know the great opportunities that are available through education; and to ensure that no one has to change who they are (like his father did) in order to fit in and achieve the "American Dream." In 2006, HENAAC (Hispanic Engineer National Achievement Awards Conference) convened an Executive Roundtable in Anaheim, California. Brady, who was a Roundtable Participant, emphasized in his speech the importance of recognizing and accepting ones Hispanic heritage. He recommended the following:

- "Become proficient in multiple languages as it will make you more marketable"
- "Speak multiple languages at home"
- "Education is the key to success in the U.S"

== Military awards and decorations ==
Among Brady's military awards are the following:

- Legion of Merit with one gold star (2 awards)
- Meritorious Service Medal with two gold stars (3 awards)
- Navy Commendation Medal with four gold stars (5 awards)
- Navy Achievement Medal
- Meritorious Unit Commendation
- Battle Efficiency "E" (two awards)
- Navy Expeditionary Medal
- National Defense Service Medal with one bronze service star
- Southwest Asia Service Medal with one bronze service star
- GWOT Service Medal
- Sea Service Ribbon with two bronze service stars
- Navy Rifle Expert
- Navy pistol Expert

Badges:

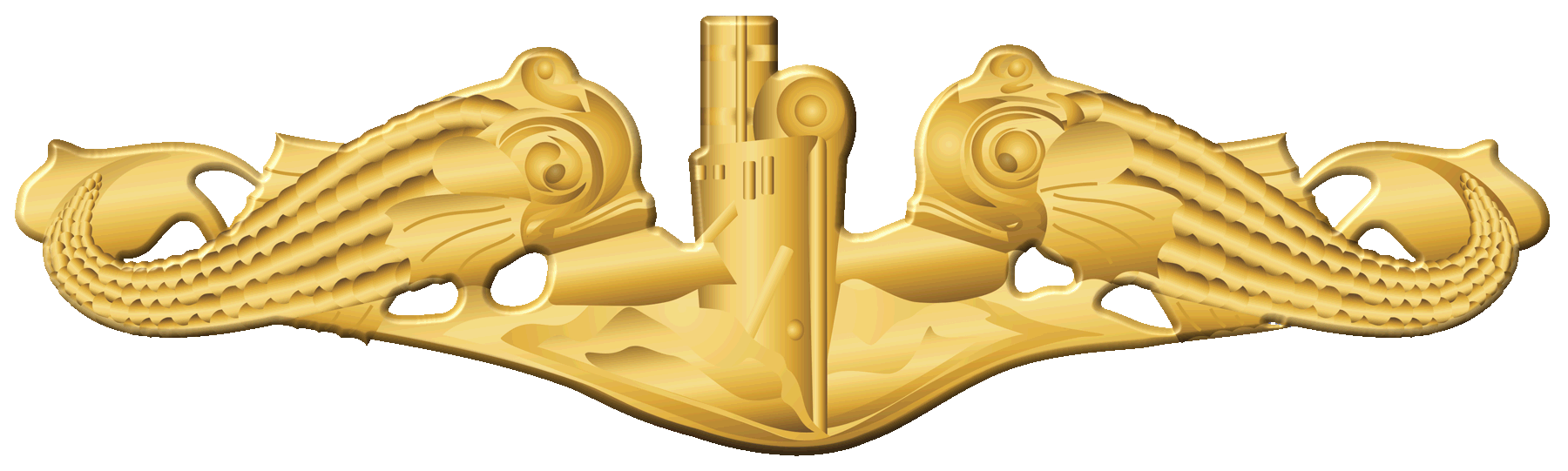
- Submarine Officers Warfare insignia
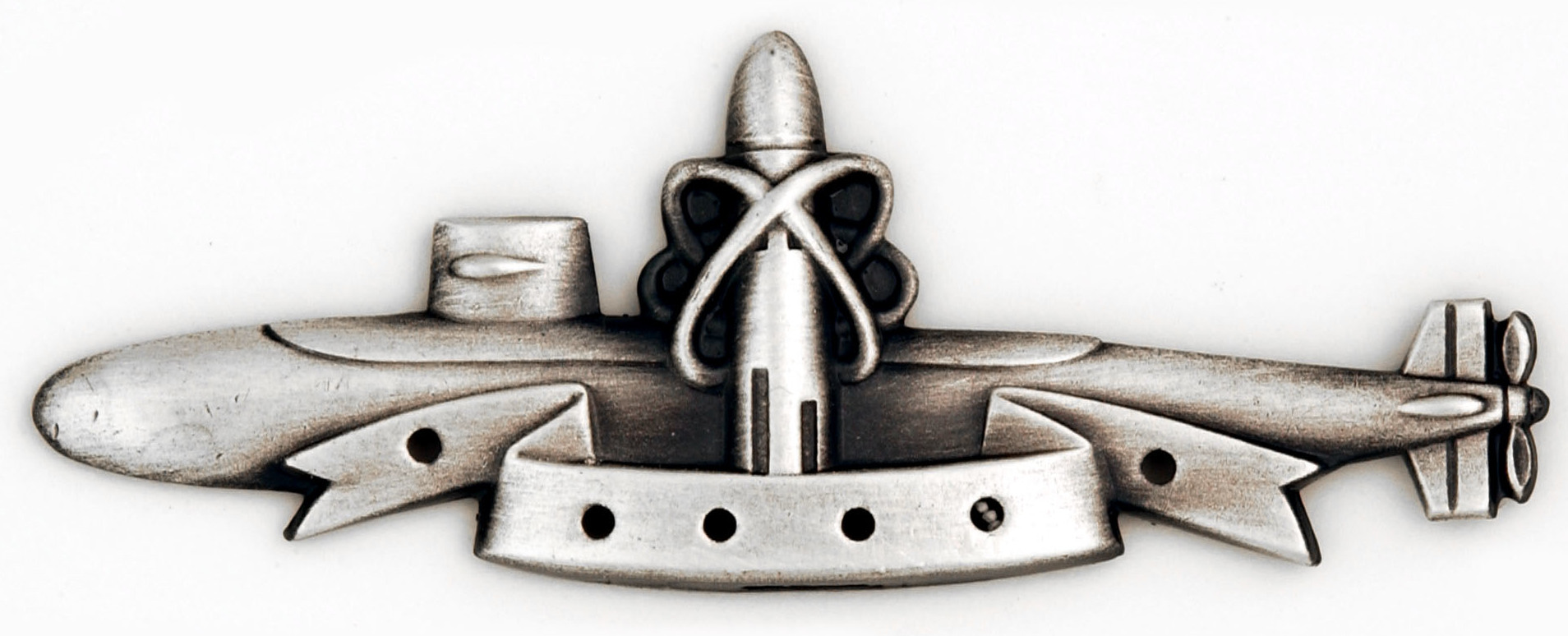
- SSBN Deterrent patrol pin

== See also ==
- Hispanic Admirals in the United States Navy
- Hispanics in the United States Navy
- Hispanics in the United States Naval Academy
