= Edwin Warren Moïse (born 1832) =

American lawyer

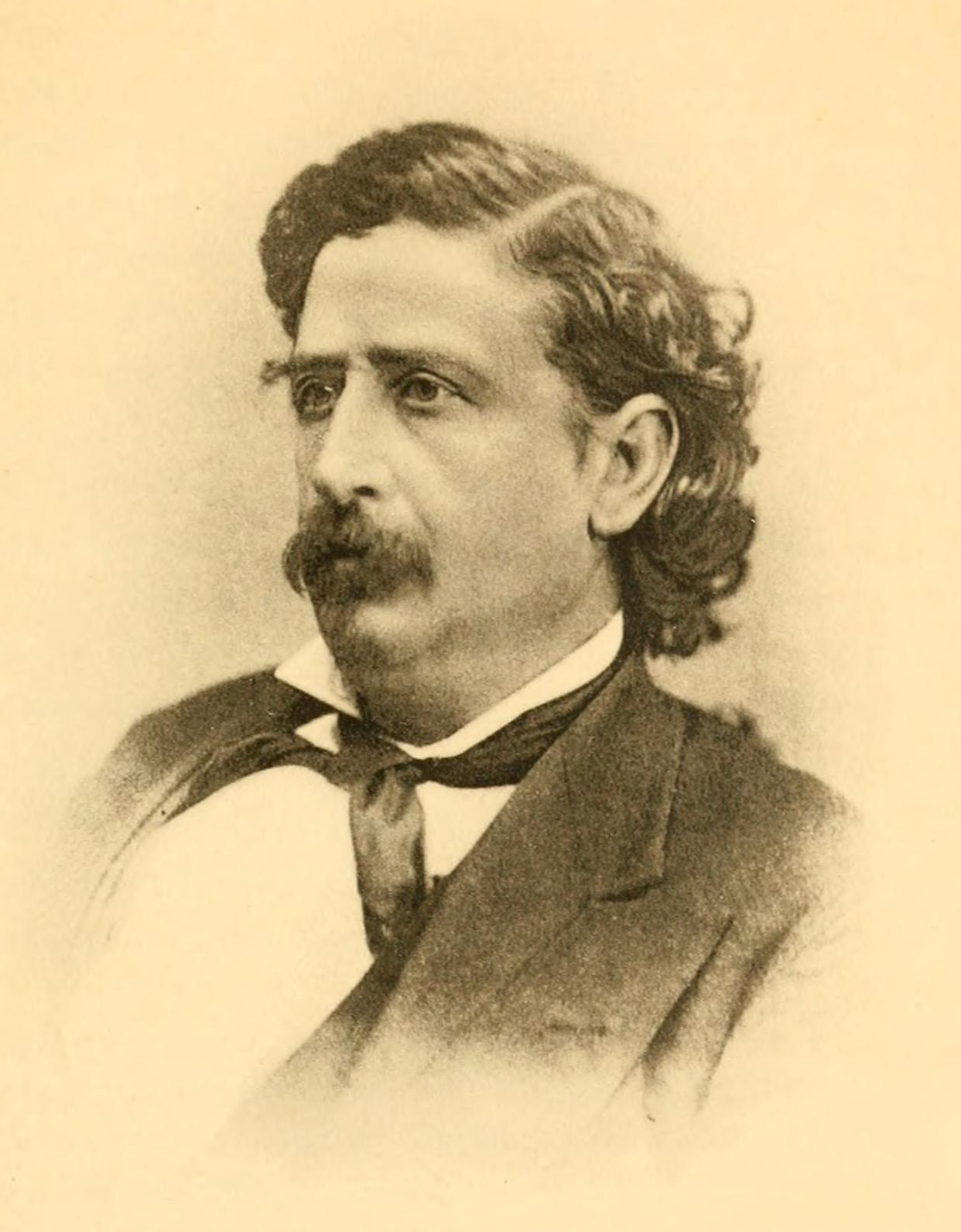
- Born: May 21, 1832; Charleston, South Carolina
- Died: December 8, 1902 (aged 70); Sumter, South Carolina
- Resting place: Jewish Cemetery, Sumter, Sumter County, South Carolina
- Occupation: Lawyer
- Spouse(s): Esther (Lyon) Moïse (1837–1917)
- Children: Marion Moïse; Rebecca Moïse-Davis; Agnes Moïse; Caroline Moïse-Cohen; Agne Moïse Bogin; Charles Moïse; Edwin Warren Moïse; Albert Luria Moïse; Penina Moïse-Phelps; Jessica Moïse-Merrimon; Lucius Clifton Moïse
- Parent(s): Abraham Moïse; Caroline Agnes (Moses) Moïse

Edwin Warren Moïse (May 21, 1832 – December 8, 1902) was a Jewish-American lawyer, Confederate officer, and Adjutant-General from South Carolina.

== Early life ==
Moïse was born on May 21, 1832, in Charleston, South Carolina. His aunt was poet Penina Moïse and his cousin was Louisiana physician, lawyer, politician, and Confederate judge Edwin Warren Moïse. His parents were Abraham Moïse and Caroline Moses. He was the descendant of Sephardic Jews who came from Alsace and the French Caribbean.

Moïse attended the common schools in the county and the Academy of John S. Cripps and Sachtleben & Miles in Charleston. Cripps later became Consul to Mexico. Moïse left school when he was fifteen due to his father's lack of means. He initially worked in a wholesale grocery in Charleston. He then spent two years in a registry office and studied law.

In 1854, when Charleston was hit with epidemics of yellow fever and smallpox, he worked as a volunteer nurse for the Howard Association until the diseases were under control. He began a small mercantile business in 1852 that lasted until 1855, when a great storm destroyed the business on Vendue Range and his cabin on Sullivan's Island. Afterwards, he accepted an invitation from his uncle Raphael J. Moses to move to his plantation in Columbus, Georgia, and run the flour mill, keep the books, and finish reading law. He was admitted to the bar shortly afterwards and began practicing in an established firm.

== Civil War ==
A Douglas Democrat, Moïse opposed secession and campaigned against it across Georgia. But when Georgia seceded and the American Civil War began, he joined the Confederacy. In January 1861, before he officially joined the Confederate military, he was a volunteer in the capture of Fort Pulaski in the mouth of the Savannah River. In June 1862, he raised a company of partisan rangers of 120 men, fifty of whom were mounted with his own $10,000 fortune. The company, named the Moise Company, later became Company A of the 7th Confederate Cavalry. When the company was formed, he was unanimously selected as its captain. He was promoted to major in 1863. He commanded the regiment near the end of the war, but was never promoted to colonel. He served with his unit in the Army of Northern Virginia and saw action in a number of important battles, including Gettysburg and Petersburg. He played an important role in the Battle of Bentonville, and was put in charge of burning a bridge in Smithfield, North Carolina, to cover the retreat of generals Wade Hampton and M. C. Butler.

Moïse also fought in the Battles of Yellow Tavern, Brandy Station, Five Forks, Averysboro, and the Mine. He helped build the dams in Hetch's Run near Petersburg with 200 men to protect General Lee's left flank from General Grant. He was wounded while fighting in Gettysburg. Three horses were killed under him while fighting in Petersburg. He was recommended for promotion to colonel following the Battle of Burgess Mill, and the recommendation was approved by General Lee, but he never received the promotion. He was also involved in foraging expeditions and the Beefsteak Raid. He surrendered with General Hampton in Greensboro, North Carolina. His original company, the Moise Rangers, was one of the few companies to be named for a Jewish Confederate.

== Legal career and politics ==
Moïse returned to Columbus after the war only to find nothing left for him. He then moved to Sumter, South Carolina, where he had a few relatives. He practiced law there, and for a few years had a partnership with Montgomery Moses and Zeligman P. Moses. In 1866, while still working as a lawyer, he began working as editor for the Sumter Watchman. In 1868, he began editing the Sumter News without compensation. He left the latter paper in 1869, when its proprietors wanted to publish some of the state's printings and he refused to water down his anti-government rhetoric. In 1880 he became an organizer and executive committee chairman of the Sumter County Park and Agricultural Association, which organized the first recorded Sumter County fair.

In 1876, Moïse left his law practice to campaign for Hampton's gubernatorial election. He was a supporter of the Red Shirts, a paramilitary organization that fought to keep Republicans from voting by terrorizing black voters with rifle clubs and playing with the emotions of white voters with speeches. Moïse was described as an effective stump speaker. He also ran for South Carolina Adjutant and Inspector General that election, and while elections in the state were disputed for five months he and the Democrats ultimately won the election and Reconstruction effectively ended in the state. He donated his entire first year's salary to public education. He was re-elected to the office in 1878, and came to be known as General Moïse for the rest of his life. A moderate on racial issues, he invited black South Carolinians to join the state militia. He served as Adjutant and Inspector General until 1880. He was a presidential elector in the 1880 presidential election, and repeatedly represented the Sumter district in state political conventions. In the 1892 United States House of Representatives election, he unsuccessfully ran as a Democratic candidate in South Carolina's 7th congressional district, losing to Republican George W. Murray, an African American. Moise appealed the loss before the State Board of Canvassers. He was an opponent of Benjamin Tillman, and as a majority of the Board were Tillmanites, they supported the black Republican Murray over the conservative anti-Tillman Moïse. He retired from his law practice in 1891, after which he served as judge of agricultural products in the 1893 Chicago World's Fair and as commissioner of the 1901 South Carolina Exposition.

== Family ==
In 1854, Moïse married Esther Lyon of Petersburg, Virginia. Their children were Major Marion, Charles, Edwin, Clifton, Albert, Mrs. Ansley Davis, Mrs. Andrew Davis, Mrs. A. D. Cohen, Mrs. Agnes Bogin, Mrs. Nina Solomons, and Jennie. Their son Marion Moise became a member of the South Carolina Senate, Intendant of Sumter, and father of South Carolina House of Representatives member David DeLeon Moise.

== Death ==
Moïse died at home on December 8, 1902. During the funeral service, his hearse was escorted by cadets from The Citadel and the Sumter Light Infantry as well as members of the Sons of Confederate Veterans. Several hundred people attended his funeral. He was buried in the local Jewish cemetery.
