= Hispanic Admirals in the United States Navy =

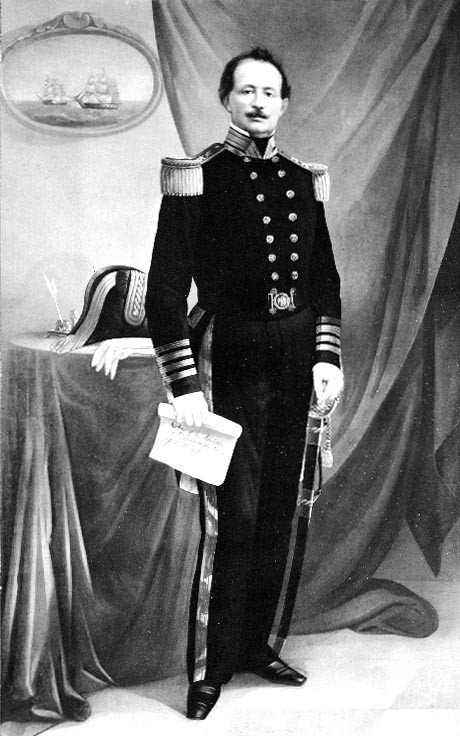
Uriah Phillips Levy

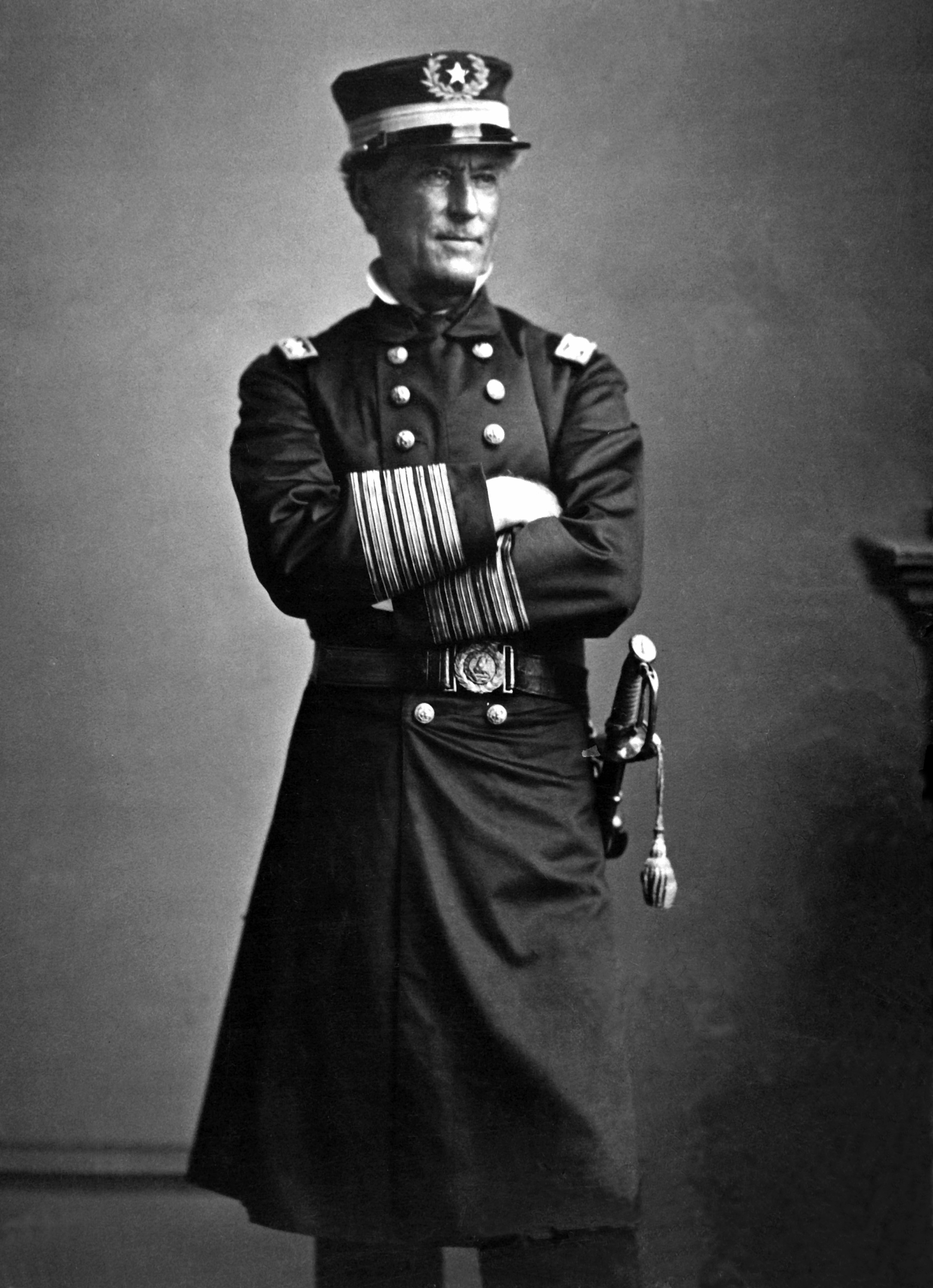
David Glasgow Farragut

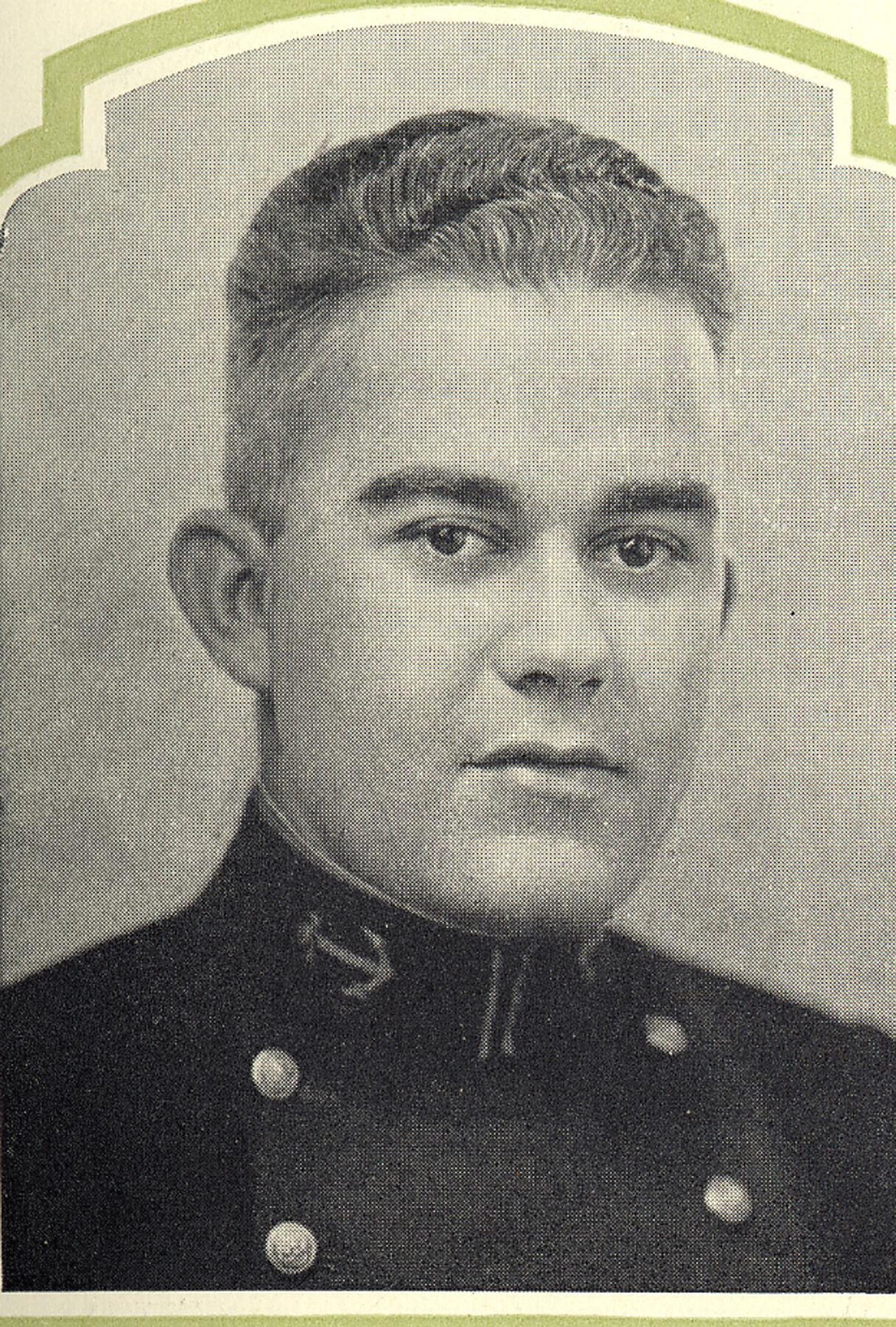
Edmund Ernest García

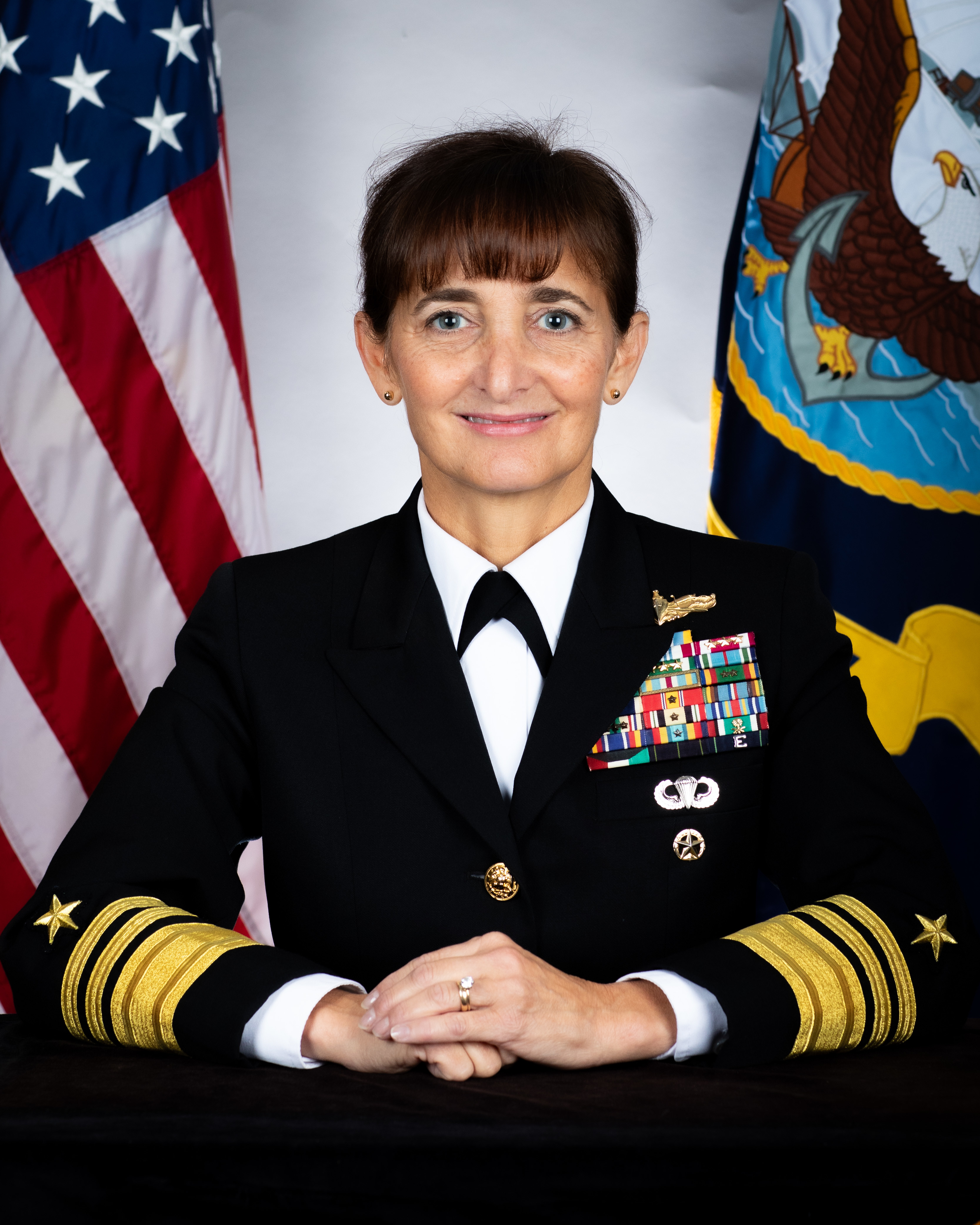
Yvette M. Davids

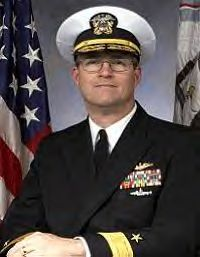
Jay A. DeLoach

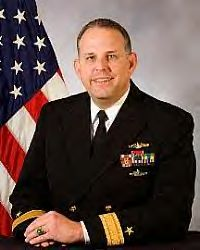
Patrick H. Brady

Hispanic and Latino Admirals in the United States Navy can trace their tradition of naval military service to the Latino sailors, who have served in the Navy in every war and conflict since the American Revolution. Prior to the Civil War, the highest rank reached by a Latino-American in the Navy was commodore. Such was the case of Commodore Uriah Phillips Levy (1792–1862), a Sephardic Jew of Latin American descent and great grandson of Dr. Samuel Nunez; Levy served in the War of 1812. During the American Civil War, the government of the United States recognized that the rapid expanding Navy was in need of admirals therefore, Congress proceeded to authorize the appointment of nine officers the rank of rear admiral. On July 16, 1862, Flag Officer David Glasgow Farragut became the first Hispanic-American to be appointed to the rank of rear admiral. Two years later (1864), Farragut became a vice admiral, and in 1866 the Navy's first full admiral. During World War I, Robert Lopez, the first Hispanic graduate of the United States Naval Academy, served with the rank of commodore in command of the Mare Island Naval Shipyard, and during World War II five Hispanics served with the ranks of rear admiral or above in either the European or Pacific Theaters of the war. As of April 2007, twenty-two Hispanic-Americans have reached the rank of admiral, and of this number thirteen were graduates of the USNA.

== Terminology ==
Admiral, a word that stems from Medieval Latin forms of the Arabic title emir ("commander"), is the rank of the highest naval officers. Admirals are now the highest-ranking "flag officers" in the U.S. Navy, although from the American Revolution until 1862, the U.S. Navy had no admiral rank.

Hispanic American is an ethnic term employed to categorize any citizen or resident of the United States, of any racial background, of any country, and of any religion, who has at least one ancestor from the people of Spain or is of non-Hispanic origin, but has an ancestor from Mexico, Puerto Rico, Cuba, Central or South America, or some other Hispanic origin. The three largest Hispanic groups in the United States are the Mexican-Americans, Puerto Ricans and Cubans.

== David Glasgow Farragut ==
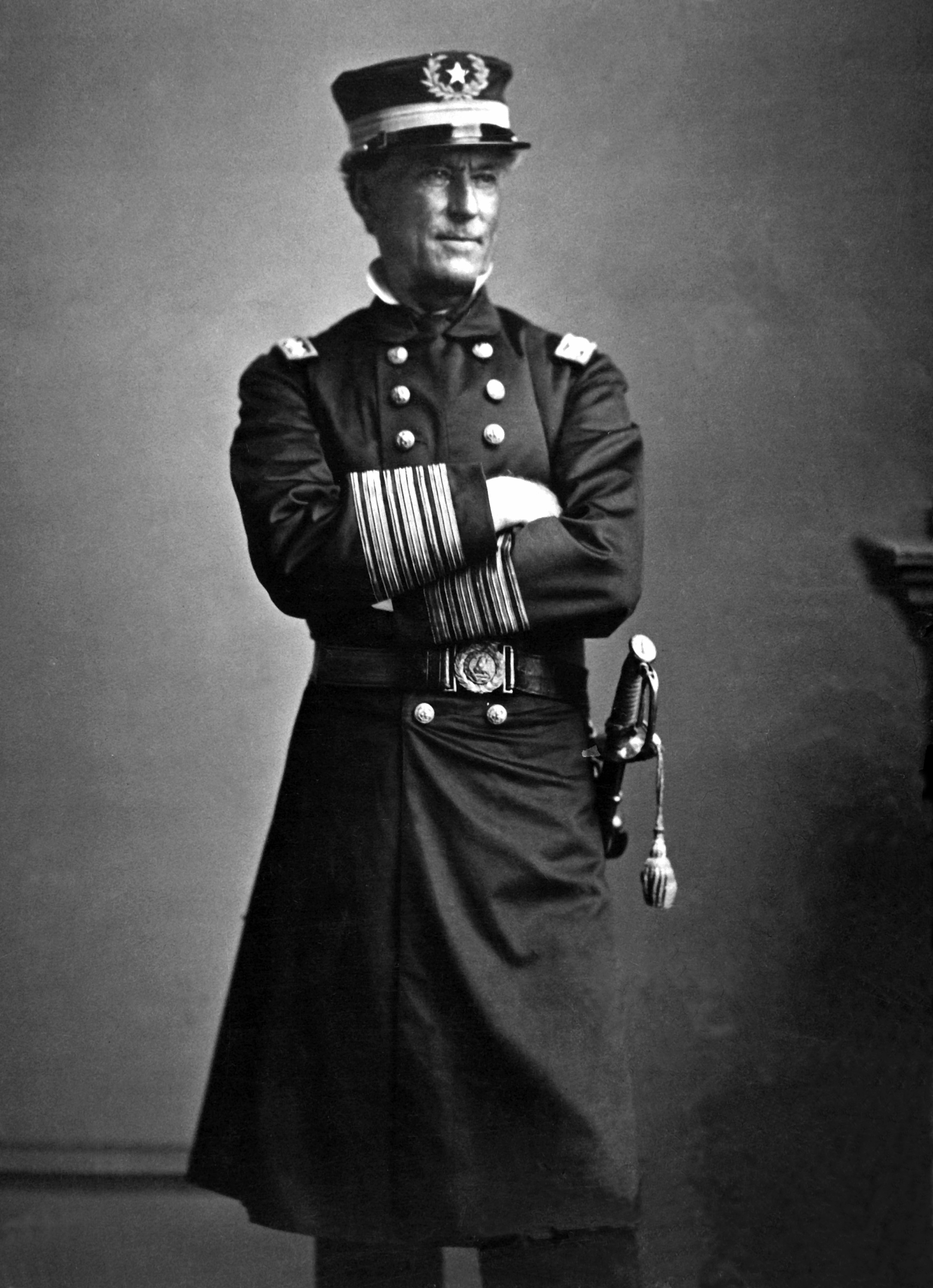
Admiral David Farragut.

Born on July 5, 1801, at Campbell's Station, near Knoxville, Tennessee, David Glasgow Farragut (born James Farragut) was the second son of Elizabeth Farragut and her husband Jorge Farragut Mesquida, a Spanish– by descent and a Minorquin by birth, who had emigrated to America in 1776. Jorge Farragut Mesquida served during the American Revolution. In 1808, Farragut's mother died from yellow fever and his father then gave him up for adoption. He was adopted by future-U.S. Navy Captain David Porter.

Farragut entered the Navy as a midshipman on December 17, 1810. His first naval combat experience came in the War of 1812, when the ship to which he was assigned, the Essex, captured an enemy vessel and, at the age of 12 he was given the assignment to bring the ship safely to port.

=== Civil War ===
In April 1862, Farragut was the "flag officer" in command of the West Gulf Blockading Squadron. With his flagship, the Hartford, he ran past Fort Jackson and Fort St. Philip and the Chalmette, Louisiana, batteries to take the city and port of New Orleans, Louisiana. This victory was an influential factor when in 1862, Congress created the rank of admiral and named Farragut and eight other naval officers (which also included his foster brother David Dixon Porter) as rear admirals. Thus, Farragut became the first Hispanic-American admiral in the United States Navy.

Farragut's greatest victory was the Battle of Mobile Bay on August 5, 1864. Mobile, Alabama, at the time was the Confederacy's last major port open on the Gulf of Mexico. The bay was heavily mined with tethered naval mines, also known as torpedoes. When the Tecumseh, one of the ships under his command, struck a mine and went down, Farragut shouted through a trumpet from his flagship to the Brooklyn, "What's the trouble?" "Torpedoes!" was the reply. Farragut then shouted his now famous words "Damn the torpedoes! Full speed ahead!" The fleet succeeded in entering the bay. Farragut then triumphed over the opposition of heavy batteries in Fort Morgan and Fort Gaines to defeat the squadron of Admiral Franklin Buchanan.

Farragut was promoted to vice admiral on December 21, 1864, and to full admiral (which at the time was three stars) on July 25, 1866, after the war, thereby becoming the first person to be named full admiral in the Navy's history.

== United States Naval Academy ==
The United States Naval Academy (USNA) is an institution for the undergraduate education of officers of the United States Navy and Marine Corps. The institution was founded as the Naval School in 1845 by Secretary of the Navy George Bancroft.

The first Hispanic-American to graduate from the academy to reach the rank of admiral was Robert F. Lopez, class of 1879. Lopez was a Commodore during World War I, which technically made him the first Hispanic alumnus to become an admiral. Commodore is an official flag rank when used during wartime and is equivalent to today's one-star admiral – rear admiral (lower half). Many rank systems only use this rank during wartime. The first Hispanic alumnus, born outside of the United States mainland, to graduate from the academy and to reach the rank of admiral was Rear Admiral Frederick Louis Riefkohl, a Puerto Rican who graduated in the class of 1911.

=== The academy's Hispanic alumni ===
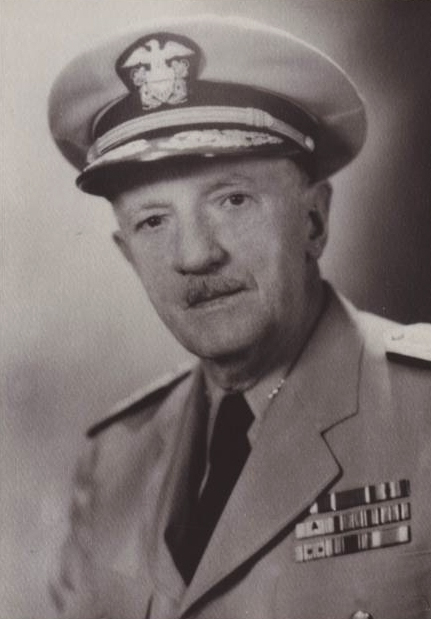
RADM Frederick Lois Riefkohl.

- Commodore Robert F. Lopez, USN – USNA Class of 1879. Born in Davenport, Iowa. Appointed from Tennessee, 9th Congressional District, Lopez was admitted to the USNA on September 29, 1874. Lopez retired from the Navy in 1911 as a captain. During World War I, he was recalled to active duty and given the rank of commodore (equivalent to a one-star admiral rank, typically used during wartime) to command the Mare Island Naval Shipyard.
- Rear Admiral Frederick Lois Riefkohl, USN – USNA Class of 1911. Born and raised in Maunabo, Puerto Rico, he is the first Puerto Rican to graduate from the Naval Academy. He was a World War I Navy Cross recipient who served as captain of the heavy cruiser Vincennes during World War II.
- Rear Admiral Jose M. Cabanillas, USN – USNA Class of 1924. Born in Mayagüez, Puerto Rico, was an executive officer of the battleship Texas, which participated in the invasions of North Africa and Normandy (D-Day) during World War II. In 1945, he became the first commanding officer of the attack transport Grundy.
- Rear Admiral Edmund Ernest García, USN – USNA Class of 1927. Born in San Juan, Puerto Rico, his father Enrique Garcia was a captain in the U.S. Army. He was originally a member of the Class of 1926 but requested to be turned back to the class of 1927 for academic deficiency in mathematics. During World War II was commander of the destroyer Sloat, and saw action in the invasions of Africa, Sicily, and France.
- Rear Admiral Henry G. Sanchez, USN – USNA Class of 1930. Born on December 29, 1907. During World War II, then-LCDR Sanchez commanded VF-72, an F4F squadron of 37 aircraft, on board the carrier Hornet from July to October 1942. His squadron was responsible for shooting down 38 Japanese airplanes during his command tour which included the Battle of the Santa Cruz Islands.
- Admiral Horacio Rivero, Jr., USN – USNA Class of 1931. Was the first four-star admiral from Puerto Rico and the second Hispanic-American full admiral, after Admiral David Farragut, in the Navy. Born in Ponce, Puerto Rico, and graduated third in his USNA class. During World War II, he served aboard the light cruiser San Juan and was involved in providing artillery cover for Marines landing on Guadalcanal, Marshall Islands, Iwo Jima, and Okinawa. In October 1962, Admiral Rivero found himself in the middle of the Cuban Missile Crisis. As Commander of amphibious forces, Atlantic Fleet, he was on the front line of the vessels sent to the Caribbean by President Kennedy to stop the Cold War from escalating into World War III.
- Rear Admiral Rafael Celestino Benítez, USN – USNA Class of 1939. Born in Juncos, Puerto Rico, was a Lieutenant Commander and saw action aboard submarines and on various occasions weathered depth charge attacks. For his actions, he was awarded the Silver and Bronze Stars. Benitez would later play an important role in the first American undersea spy mission of the Cold War as commander of the submarine Cochino in what became known as the "Cochino Incident".
- Vice Admiral Jesse J. Hernandez, USN – USNA Class of 1958. Hernandez was the commander of US Naval Forces Japan from 1990 to 1993.
- Rear Admiral Benjamin F. Montoya, USN – USNA Class of 1958 (Ret.). A native of Indio, California, Montoya served in various positions during his naval career. Montoya's academic accomplishments include a civil engineering degree from Rensselaer Polytechnic Institute, a master's degree in environmental engineering from Georgia Tech and a law degree from Georgetown University. He was the chief of the Navy Civil Engineer Corps and commander of the Naval Facilities Engineering Command.
- Rear Admiral Henry F. Herrera, USN – USNA Class of 1966.(Ret.) Herrera was born in Miami Springs, Florida, is the president of the Board of Inspection and Survey, the commander of Submarine Group NINE, and the director of C41 Systems (J-6), U.S. Strategic Command. He had previously, served as the commanding officer of two fleet ballistic missile submarines.
- Rear Admiral Marc Y.E. Pelaez, USN – USNA Class of 1968 (Ret.). Pelaez served in various positions in the Navy during his career, among them commanding officer of nuclear-powered attack submarine Sunfish. From 1990 to 1993 he served as the executive assistant to the Assistant Secretary of the Navy, and from 1993 to 1996 as director of submarine technology at the Defense Advanced Research Projects Agency (DARPA), and chief of the Office of Naval Research. As a civilian he serves as director of Technology / Scientific and Technical Instruments at II-VI Incorporated, Saxonburg, Pennsylvania.
- Rear Admiral George "Rico" Mayer, USN – USNA Class of 1975. Born and raised in Puerto Rico, became a naval aviator and assumed his current assignment as commander of the Naval Safety Center, in August 2005. Mayer earned a master's degree from the U.S. Naval War College.
- Rear Admiral Jay A. DeLoach, USN – USNA Class of 1978. Born in San Diego, California, His academic background includes a Bachelor of Science degree in marine engineering and two master's degrees; Master of Arts in Management & Supervision and Masters of Engineering in Nuclear Engineering. DeLoach is the assistant deputy chief of naval operations for resources, requirements and assessments. DeLoach played an instrumental role in implementing a visionary "Memorandum of Understanding" between the Submarine Force Active component and the Reserve component. He helped pioneer many key initiatives that have since been adopted Navy-wide.
- Rear Admiral Patrick H. Brady, USN – USNA Class of 1981. Born in Camp Springs, Maryland, is the deputy director of the Submarine Warfare Division (N87B). Brady, who is of Irish and Hispanic descent graduated from the United States Naval Academy in 1981 with a Bachelor of Science in Ocean Engineering. Brady's academic accomplishments also include a Master of Arts in National Security Affairs from the Naval Postgraduate School. He attended the Air Force Command and Staff College, and completed Navy Nuclear Power training and Level Three acquisition training. Prior to his current position, Brady was the commander of the Naval Undersea Warfare Center.
- Rear Admiral Yvette M. Davids, USN – USNA Class of 1989. From San Antonio, Texas, is senior military advisor to the Assistant Secretary of State for Political-Military Affairs. She became the first Hispanic woman to command a Navy warship when she assumed command of the frigate Curts in April 2007. During a later assignment she also commanded the cruiser Bunker Hill. She has earned master's degrees from the Naval War College and the Industrial College of the Armed Forces.

== Other Hispanic admirals ==
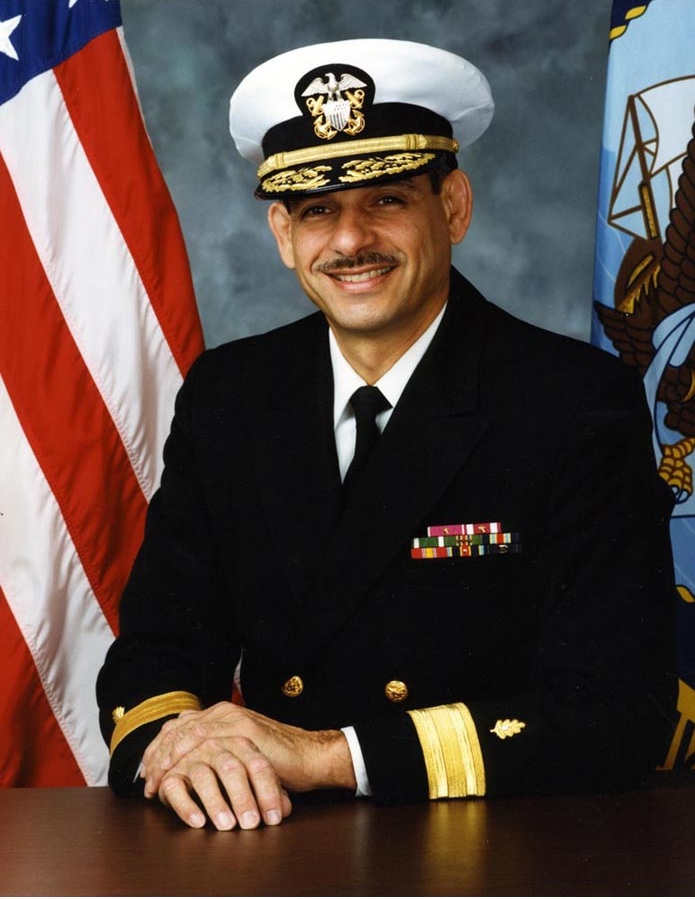
RADM Alberto Díaz, Jr.

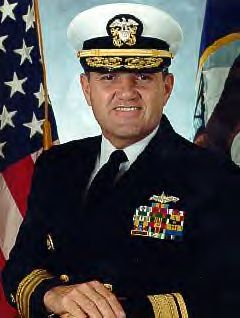
RADM Philip A. Dur.

There are also some members of the Navy who reached the rank of admiral and who were not graduates of the Naval Academy. These were men who had earned specialized degrees and then chose to serve in the Navy. The following are the Hispanic admirals who are not alumni of the Academy.

- Rear Admiral Jose Luis Betancourt, Jr. (Surface Warfare) (Ret.), was commander of the Mine Warfare Command, headquartered at Naval Air Station (NAS) Corpus Christi, Texas. Betancourt, who was born in Mexico, had previously served aboard the LST Frederick, destroyer John S. McCain, frigate William H. Standley, and as executive officer of the cruiser Fox. He served as commanding officer of the destroyer Merrill, during its deployment to the Persian Gulf during Operation Desert Storm, where during extensive mine clearance operations his ship served as flagship. Betancourt, served in various positions, among them commanding officer of the amphibious assault ship Peleliu, special assistant for Officer Accession Programs, Office of the Chief of Naval Personnel at Washington, D.C., and in the International Military Staff at NATO Headquarters in Brussels, Belgium before being named commander of the Mine Warfare Command. In this position he was responsible for the development of the Navy's mining strategy and the Navy's inventory of underwater mines among other tasks.
- Rear Admiral Alberto Díaz, Jr. (Medical Corps) (Ret.), born in San Juan, Puerto Rico, earned a Bachelor of Arts degree from George Washington University and a master's degree in psychology from Butler University. He earned his medical degree from the University of Barcelona Medical School in Barcelona, Spain. Diaz was the first Hispanic to become the director of the San Diego Naval District and Balboa Naval Hospital.
- Rear Admiral Philip A. Dur (Ret.), born in Bethesda, Maryland, earned a bachelor's degree in Government and International Studies and a master's degree in Soviet East European studies from the University of Notre Dame. He also earned a master's degree in Public Administration and a Ph.D. in Political Economy and Government from Harvard University. Dur served as Assistant Deputy Chief of Naval Operations; director of the Navy Strategy Division; commander of the Battle Force United States Sixth Fleet; commander of Cruiser Destroyer Group EIGHT; United States Defense Attaché accredited to the Government of France; commanding officer, Yorktown; and director of the Political Military Affairs on the staff of the National Security Council.
- Rear Admiral Alvaro R. Gomez (Ret.) born in Brooklyn, New York, earned a bachelor's degree in history from St. Johns University and a Master of Science degree in business administration from George Washington University.
- Vice Admiral Diego E. Hernández (Ret.), born in San Juan, was the first Hispanic to be named vice commander of the North American Aerospace Defense Command (NORAD). Hernandez as commander of the Third Fleet, coordinated RIMPAC '88, a massive naval exercise which included more than 40 ships, approximately 200 aircraft and more than 50,000 sailors, airmen and Marines from the United States, Japan, Australia and Canada. This exercise marked the first inclusion of a battleship, the Missouri, as a component in RIMPAC.
- Rear Admiral Rodrigo C. Melendez (Dental Corps) (Ret.), from Los Angeles, California, joined a Navy Dental Student Early Commissioning Program during his freshmen year in Dental School. He earned Bachelor of Science and Doctor of Dental Surgery degrees from the University of Southern California and a Master of Science degree from George Washington University. He served as Assistant Chief for Education, Training and Personnel, Bureau of Medicine and Surgery in Washington, D.C.
- Rear Adm. Moises DelToro III, grew up in South Bend, Indiana, and enlisted in the Navy in 1980. He was commissioned via the University of Utah Navy ROTC program in 1987 with a Bachelor of Science in Mechanical Engineering. He holds a Master of Science in Engineering Management from the Catholic University and a Master of Science in Resourcing National Security Strategy from the Industrial College of the Armed Forces.

His sea tours include command of the USS Rhode Island (SSBN 740 Blue) from March 2005 to March 2008. During this period, the ship was awarded two Battle Efficiency Awards for operational excellence and three Commander-in-Chief, Atlantic Fleet Retention Excellence Awards. DelToro also served as a division officer aboard USS Pittsburgh (SSN 720); engineer officer aboard USS Maine (SSBN 741 Blue), and executive officer aboard USS Salt Lake City (SSN 716), deploying to the Mediterranean, North Atlantic and Western Pacific, as well as conducting several strategic deterrent patrols.

Ashore he served as Nuclear Propulsion Officer Candidate Program Manager at Navy Recruiting Command, Action Officer on the Joint Staff (J-8), and Non-nuclear Enlisted Community Manager at the Bureau of Personnel. DelToro also served as executive assistant to the Director, Submarine Warfare (N-97) for one year before entering the Acquisition Professional Community in 2009, where he served in a number of assistant program manager positions. DelToro served as the program manager for Undersea Defensive Warfare Systems from December 2011 to April 2015. During this period the program was awarded a Secretary of the Navy Excellence in Acquisition Award and a Coalition for Government Procurement Excellence in Partnership Award. He was the recipient of the 2013 Naval Submarine League’s Vice Admiral J. Guy Reynolds Award for Excellence in Submarine Acquisition.

DelToro assumed command of the Naval Undersea Warfare Center (NUWC) in July 2015. In this position, he was responsible for leading more than 5,000 scientists, engineers, technicians and support personnel, both civilian and active duty, within two NUWC divisions. NUWC provides full spectrum research, development, test and evaluation, engineering, and fleet support for submarines, autonomous underwater systems, and offensive and defensive weapon systems associated with undersea warfare.

Personal awards include the Legion of Merit (two awards), Defense Meritorious Service Medal, Meritorious Service Medal (two awards), and various other personal, campaign, and unit awards.

== 2007 - present ==
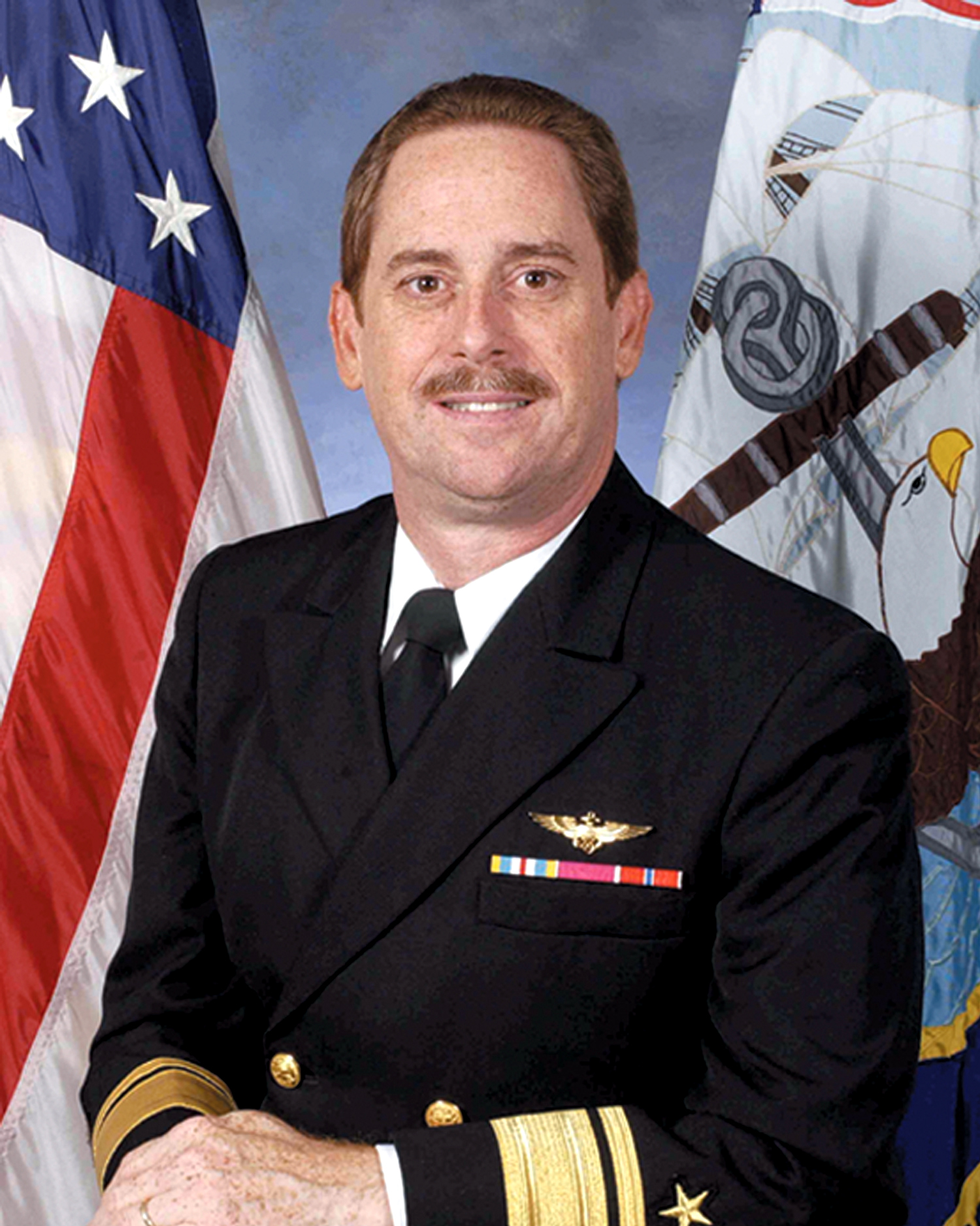
RADM George "Rico" Mayer.

As of April 2007, there are four admirals in the Navy of Hispanic descent. They are:

- Rear Admiral Albert Garcia, Civil Engineer Corps, from Round Rock, Texas. His academic background includes a Bachelor of Science, Master of Science, and Ph.D. in Environmental Engineering from Texas A&M University. Garcia has served as commanding officer of Officer in Charge of Construction, Atlantic; Commodore for the 9th Naval Construction Regiment; Assistant Chief of Staff for Reserve Affairs in the First Naval Construction Division; he commanded Task Force Charlie of the MEF Engineering Group and later was assigned as the Deputy Commander of the MEF Engineering Group in Iraq. In 2004 he assumed responsibility for consolidating several reserve augment units into a new command, NAVFAC Contingency OICC. He assumed the duties of Deputy Commander of the First Naval Construction Division in August 2005.
- Rear Admiral Will Rodriguez, Engineering Duty Officer. Born in Portsmouth, Virginia, His father was Captain William Primitivo Rodriguez, USN, a 1954 graduate of the U.S. Naval Academy. Rodriguez has been the Chief Engineer for the Space and Naval Warfare Systems Command (SPAWAR 05). Between November 2005 and February 2006, he was the Acting Commander for SPAWAR as well. Rodriguez's academic background includes a bachelor's degree in Mathematics and Computer Science and a Master of Science Degree in Systems Technology (Command, Control and Communications with emphasis in Computer Science and Communications Engineering).
- Rear Admiral George 'Rico' Mayer (See: The academy's Hispanic alumni above)
- Rear Admiral Patrick H. Brady (See: The academy's Hispanic alumni above)

== See also ==
- Hispanics and Latinos in the United States Naval Academy
- Hispanics and Latinos in the United States Navy
- Hispanics and Latinos in the United States Coast Guard
- Hispanics and Latinos in the United States Marine Corps
- Hispanics and Latinos in the United States Air Force
- Hispanic and Latino Americans in World War II
- Hispanics and Latinos in the American Civil War
- History of the United States Navy
- List of United States Navy people
- List of Hispanic and Latino Medal of Honor recipients
