= Marion Moise =

South Carolina lawyer and state senator

Marion Moise (June 14, 1855 – January 30, 1910) was a lawyer who served as a state senator for South Carolina from 1886 to 1890 and held various local offices in South Carolina.

He came from a prominent family. Edwin Warren Moïse (born 1832) was his father.

His son David DeLeon Moïse also held political office.

Moise committed suicide by firearm in early 1910.
