= Jay A. DeLoach =

American naval officer (born 1955)

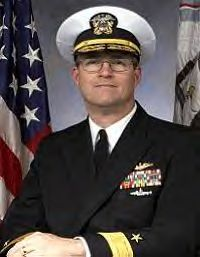
- Rear Admiral Jay A. DeLoach
- Born: December 9, 1955 (age 70); San Diego, California
- Military career
- Allegiance: United States of America
- Branch: United States Navy
- Service years: 1974–2007
- Rank: Rear admiral
- Commands: NR COMSEVENTHFLT Detachment 111; NR COMSUBRON SIX Detachment 504; NR OPNAV Detachment SITE-R 109
- Awards: Legion of Merit (2); Defense Meritorious Service Medal; Meritorious Service Medal (2); Joint Service Commendation Medal
- Other work: Excepted Service for the Defense Nuclear Facilities Safety Board

Rear Admiral Jay Allan DeLoach (born December 9, 1955) served as the Director of Naval History and Director of the Naval History and Heritage Command and the Curator of the Navy from 2008 to 2012. He was an American submarine officer who played a role in implementing a visionary "Memorandum of Understanding" between the Submarine Force Active component and the Reserve component. He helped pioneer many key initiatives that have since been adopted Navy-wide. DeLoach was the Assistant Deputy Chief of Naval Operations for Resources, Requirements and Assessments.

== Early years ==
DeLoach was born in San Diego, California, to Jesse Howell DeLoach and Berta Peña, a woman from Texas of Hispanic-American descent. DeLoach's father was a chief yeoman when he met Ms Peña, who at that time (early 1950s) worked building F-102 fighters at the Convair plant in San Diego. DeLoach's father received a commission in 1960 through the Limited Duty Officer program and as a result, the family was in a constant state of relocation, with DeLoach attending schools in various states.

DeLoach's family had a strong tradition of Naval Service. His grandfather was a chief machinist's mate in the Navy and served for 23 years from 1922 to 1945. DeLoach received his first taste of what Navy life when he was a teenager and his father took him out on his minesweeper for two weeks. This experience plus, the fact that it was his family's tradition to serve in the Navy were influential factors when in 1974 he choose to attend the United States Naval Academy upon his graduation from First Colonial High in Virginia Beach, Virginia.

Because of a permanent injury to his right shoulder from birth, DeLoach barely passed the entrance physical exam and medical screening to get into the Naval Academy. DeLoach passed the physical as a result of his parents' early intervention and persistent exercising of his arm. He was able to make good use of his right arm even though it only had one-third of the strength of his left arm.

== Military career ==
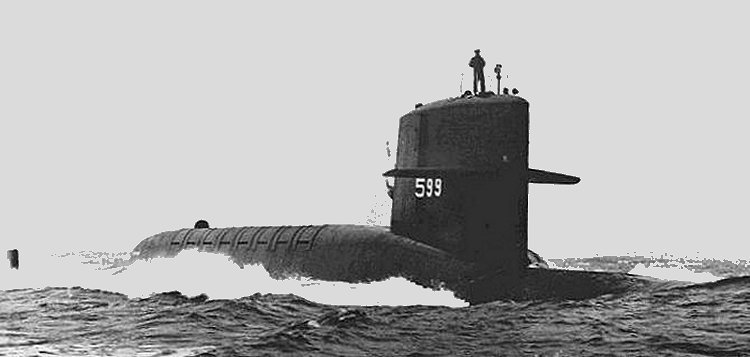
USS Patrick Henry (SSBN-599)

DeLoach graduated with a Bachelor of Science degree in marine engineering from the Naval Academy in 1978 and commissioned an ensign. He entered training and service in submarines and made ten deterrent patrols on the USS Kamehameha (SSBN-642) in the Mediterranean, USS Patrick Henry (SSBN-599) in the South China Sea, and USS Lewis and Clark (SSBN-644) in northern Atlantic. He served as an engineering officer in the latter two and was awarded three Battle Efficiency 'E' awards. In 1980, he was promoted to lieutenant junior grade and in 1983 to lieutenant. DeLoach, who received a spot promotion to lieutenant commander in 1984, was the sonar transducer branch chief at Naval Sea Systems Command from 1987 to 1989. During this period of time DeLoach earned a Masters of Arts in management and supervision degree from Central Michigan University in 1987 and in 1988 was permanently promoted to lieutenant commander.

== Navy Reserve ==
After his active duty tours, DeLoach continued his service with the Navy Reserve. Amongst his assignments were Naval Intelligence, OPNAV N87 Submarine Warfare staff, Navy Recruiting, Commander 7th Fleet staff, and Naval Sea Systems Command Inspector General. He served as the Reserve Force Director for 44 reserve units reporting to the Commander Submarine Force, U.S. Atlantic Fleet and as the commanding officer of NR COMSEVENTHFLT Detachment 111. He was also the commanding officer of the Submarine Squadron SIX reserve detachment, and the OPNAV Detachment Site-R. Among the various awards which his units received under his command are the Captain Leo V. Bilger Award for excellence in mission effectiveness and a CNO Letter of Commendation. He completed two extended active duty assignments with the Joint Staff J7 working on Joint Doctrine and Professional Military Education initiatives. In 1993, DeLoach earned a Master of Engineering in nuclear engineering from the University of Virginia and was promoted to commander.

DeLoach played an instrumental role in furthering the integration of the Submarine Force's Reserve Component with the Active component into a surge-ready force. Under DeLoach's direction, the Submarine Force's Reserve Component has continued to lead this transformation to the new model of warfighting wholeness. DeLoach's role in implementing a visionary Memorandum of Understanding between the Submarine Force Active component and the Reserve component is considered to have pioneered many key initiatives that have since been adopted Navy-wide.

On February 25, 2003, then Captain DeLoach was nominated for appointment to the rank of rear admiral (lower half) while serving as commanding officer, Naval Reserve, commander, Seventh Fleet Detachment 111, Fort Worth, Texas. That same year he earned a Masters of Arts in National Security and Strategic Studies form the Naval War College. On September 3, DeLoach was promoted to rear admiral in a ceremony held at the Navy Memorial in Washington, D.C.

== Search for the USS Alligator ==
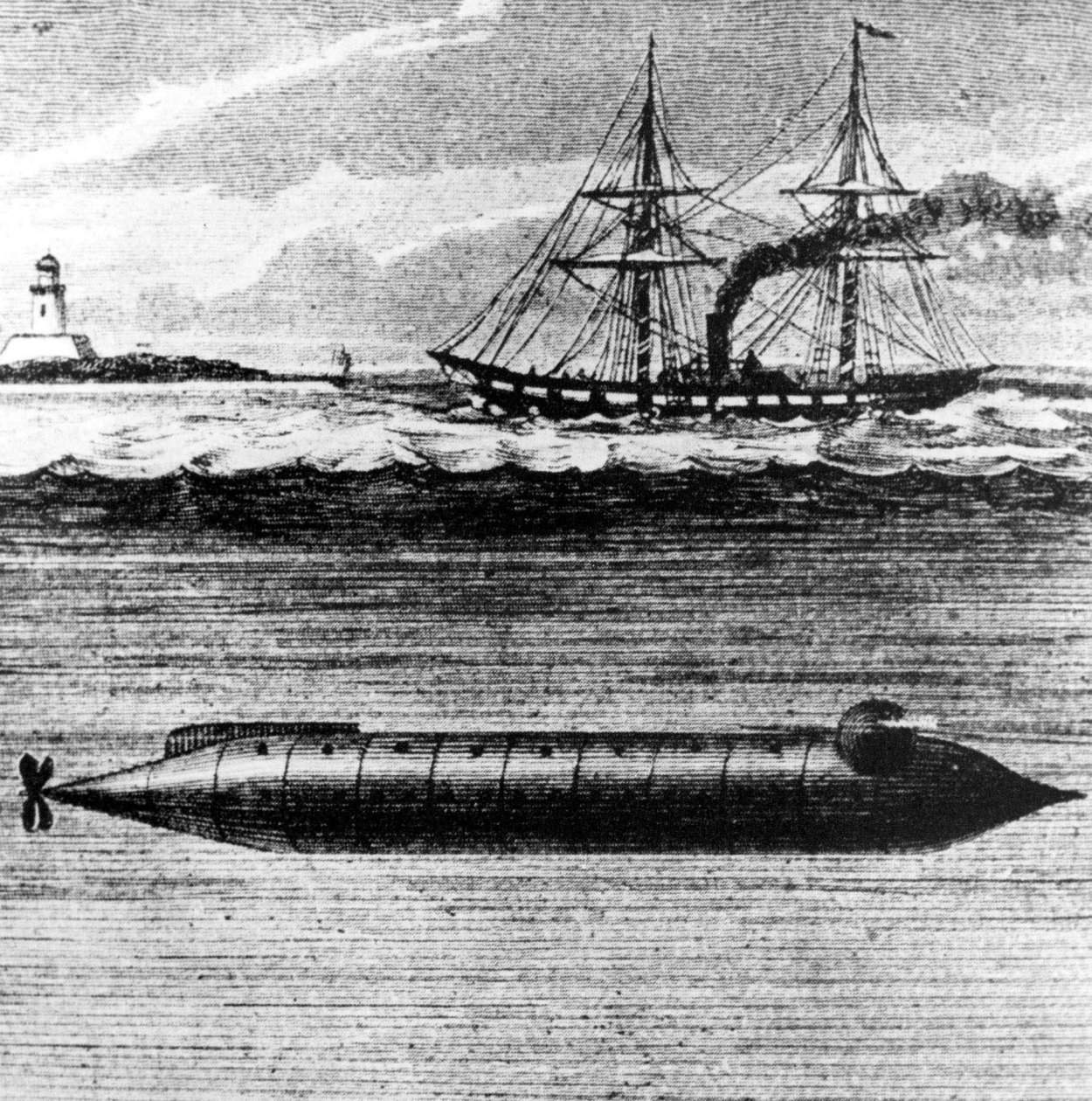
USS Alligator

DeLoach was contacted by the Director of Naval Research, RADM Jay Cohen, to help search for USS Alligator, the first US submarine, that sank in a storm off the coast of North Carolina in 1863, close to where USS Monitor went down. Using a variety of remote sensing instruments, researchers from NOAA, the Office of Naval Research, and East Carolina University conducted the first comprehensive hunt for the lost Civil War vessel. USS Alligator was the first submarine built during the Civil War by the Union Navy. The Navy wanted such a vessel to counter the threat posed to its wooden-hulled blockaders by the former screw frigate Merrimack which, according to intelligence reports, the Norfolk Navy Yard was rebuilding as an ironclad ram for the Confederacy (the CSS Virginia). The search's main objective in locating the vessel is to educate the Submarine Force and Navy in general that their undersea heritage actually started back in the Civil War era. Alligator had not been found as of 2023.

== Last assignment ==
DeLoach was the Assistant Deputy Chief of Naval Operations for Resources, Requirements and Assessments. Among his responsibilities was to support the development, management, and execution of the Navy's budget and shipbuilding/weapon system programs. DeLoach retired from the Navy on August 25, 2007, after 33 years of service.

== Director of Naval History ==
DeLoach served as the 12th Director of Naval History from 23 June 2008 to 14 May 2012.

The Director of Naval History (N09BH), under the direction of the Director, Navy Staff (N09B), is the primary official in the Navy Department responsible for protecting the Navy's material culture and for preserving, interpreting, and disseminating the intellectual legacy of the naval service. The Director carries out the following functions:

- Coordinates historical and archival activities throughout the Navy.
- Serves as chief historical advisor to fleet commanders and other operational Navy commanders.
- Deploys historical documentation teams to fleet units and Navy commands to record and document the history of current naval operations during wartime, declared national emergency, or as directed.
- Encourages naval historical research and provides historical information services.
- Serves as program sponsor and technical manager for Selected Reservists assigned to the Naval Historical Center and combat operations documentation teams.
- Sponsors the Secretary of the Navy's Advisory Subcommittee on Naval History.
- Serves as Curator for the Navy.
- Serves as immediate superior NHC Detachment Boston (USS Constitution Maintenance and Repair Facility).
- Publishes Naval Aviation News magazine.
- Provides overall policy regarding the ship model program to Commander, Naval Sea Systems Command; Commanding Officer, Naval Surface Warfare Command; and Curator of Ship Models acting as liaison between the Curator of Ship Models and the Chief of Naval Operations for budgetary and policy matters.
- Served as Coordinator for the U.S. Navy's museum program.
- Served as Director of the Naval History & Heritage Command.

== Personal ==
He was selected to Who's Who in Executives and Professionals for 2002, 2003, and 2004. He is a member of several professional societies, including the Association of Naval Service Officers, Reserve Officer Association, U.S. Naval Institute, and Naval Submarine League. A member of the Sons of the American Revolution, he was selected to receive the Minuteman Award in 2025.

DeLoach previously worked for the Defense Nuclear Facilities Safety Board in Washington, D.C.. He is also an adjunct professor teaching one night a week for the Naval War College.

He has been the motivational keynote speaker in various Hispanic related conferences. Among them the recently held Society of Mexican American Engineers and Scientists, Inc. 18th Annual National Leadership Conference held at the University of Texas in El Paso, Texas.

DeLoach has actively participated with UBPN (United Brachial Plexus Network) Camp 2007 in Auburn, Washington as an invited speaker and together with his wife as donors. He resides in Herndon, Virginia, with his wife Jodi whom he met in 1978 at a dance at the Naval Academy. They have two grown daughters, Jessica and Jaclyn.

== Awards and decorations ==
Among Rear Admiral Deloach's military decorations are the following:

- Legion of Merit (2)
- Defense Meritorious Service Medal
- Meritorious Service Medal (2)
- Joint Service Commendation Medal
- Navy Commendation Medal (3)
- Navy Achievement Medal (3)
- Joint Meritorious Unit Citation
- Meritorious Unit Commendation (3)
- Battle Efficiency "E" (3)
- National Defense Service Medal (3)
- Military Outstanding Volunteer Service Medal
- Sea Service Ribbon
- Foreign Overseas Ribbon
- Navy Recruiting Ribbon
- Armed Forces Reserve Medal

Badges:

- Submarine Warfare insignia (Officer)
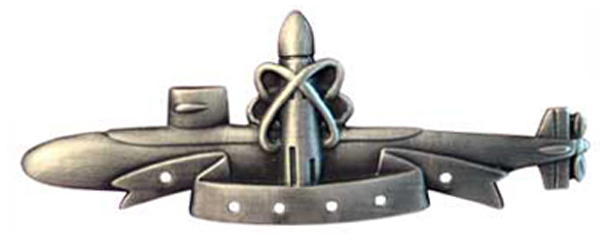
- Silver SSBN Deterrent Patrol insignia (11 awards)

== See also ==
- Hispanic Admirals in the United States Navy
- Hispanics in the United States Navy
- Hispanics in the United States Naval Academy
