= Samuel Nunez =

Portuguese physician

Samuel Nunez (1668–1744) was a Portuguese physician and among the earliest Jews to settle in North America.

A few months after their February 1733 arrival from England, an epidemic began claiming the lives of the first 114 colonists of the infant American colony of Georgia. The first to die in April was the colony's only doctor.

Unexpectedly, the William and Sarah, a second ship from London, landed in Savannah on July 11, carrying a middle-aged physician and 40 more Jewish passengers. Dr. Samuel Nunes (1668–1744) was allowed by the colony's founder, General James Edward Oglethorpe, to begin treating the ill. By the time the middle-aged Portuguese physician began his treatments and during the month of his arrival, around two dozen died. However, the death rate dwindled dramatically to only a few with the epidemic ending by the end of that year. Over the protests of the London Trustees who did not want Georgia to become "a Jewish colony," General Oglethorpe allowed the Jewish people to settle in Savannah.

They were the “largest group of Jews to land in North America in Colonial days.” As told by one of his seven children, daughter Zipra, to her great-grandson Mordecai Manuel Noah, Dr. Nunis and his family embarked on a dramatic escape from Lisbon to London in 1726 for religious freedom, fleeing the Portuguese Inquisition.

== Name ==
Nunez was born Diogo Nunes Ribeiro in 1668. Nunis is another common spelling for his surname. After his escape from Portugal allowed him and his family to practice Judaism openly, he changed his name to Samuel Nunez in 1727, the name he is known by today.

== In Portugal ==
Nunis was born Diogo Nunes Ribeiro in 1668 during the Portuguese Inquisition. He was born to a Marrano family, one that was publicly Catholic but practicing Judaism in secret. Has ancestors began practicing Judaism in secret during the Spanish Inquisition, and eventually fled Spain for Portugal. However, due to persecution of Jews in Portugal, the family continued to practice in secret.

Nunis learned the practice of medicine and grew to become one of the most successful doctors in Portugal at an unusually young age. He served as physician to both the King of Portugal and the Grand Inquisitor. In addition, the Portuguese nobility consider it an honor to receive treatment from Nunis.

While publicly Catholic, Nunis was a practicing Jew. His rivals reported their suspicion to the Inquisition, who placed an agent in the Nunis household, posing as a servant. This agent reported that the Nunis family was visiting a secret synagogue in an underground part of their mansion in Lisbon.

Dr. Nunez, his mother Zipporah, his wife Gracia (later known as Rebecca). Their three sons Joseph, Daniel and Moses; their three daughters Rachel, Esther and Zipra; and servant Shem Noah were apprehended by the "Familiars of the Inquisition" during a Passover Service, "while seeking the Lord according to their prohibited faith." They were imprisoned and repeatedly tortured, but saved by the personal intervention of the Grand Inquisitor. The Catholic Ecclesiastical Council agreed to release Dr Nunez so that he could treat the Grand Inquisitor's medical conditions. As a condition of his release, two members of the Inquisition were to live with the family to ensure that they didn't practice the Jewish faith. This led to the Nunez family plotting their escape.

== Escape to London ==
Nunez shortly after began plotting his escape from Portugal. Nunez sold parts of his estates and possessions and used couriers to secretly transfer the money to England, with the assistance of his servants and his relatives, the Mendez family. Publicly, Nunez established himself as a socialite, arranging banquets and balls for high-ranking officials.

Nunez has used his funds to hire an English captain to bring his brigantine to the Tagus River, near Nunez's home. In August 1726, the captain invited the Nunez family on board his ship, and the family's two Inquisition minders boarded the ship with the family. About an hour after boarding, the ship began sailing, and went directly to London with the two unknowing Inquisition officials on board.

Once in London, Samuel and his sons underwent circumcision to identify themselves as Jewish. Diogo and Gracia remarried in a Jewish ceremony and changed their names to Samuel and Rebecca. Early in 1727, Rebecca gave birth to their seventh and last child, a son who died as an infant.

== Georgia colony ==
A few years later in 1733, the Nunez family was among several mainly Sephardic Jewish families from Portugal who left London for the colony of Georgia. Also joining them on the William and Sarah was a small group of Ashkenazi Jews with German origins.

London Jews had been contributing liberally to James Oglethorpe's plan to settle Georgia, providing new homes for impoverished Christians in the new colony of Georgia. In 1732 there were 6,000 Sephardic Jews living in London having lived as Crypto-Jews, publicly practicing Roman Catholicism and secretly preserving their Jewish heritage, prior to their departure from Portugal. The Bevis Marks Synagogue, still a Sephardic Jewish congregation in London today, helped finance the trip of their congregants.

All but eight of the original 42 Jewish colonists to Georgia were among these Spanish/Portuguese Jews who had arrived in London seven years earlier. They chartered two boats and sent a total of 90 Jews to Savannah in one year. Sailing on the first of these boats was Dr. Nunez and some of his family. They arrived in Savannah on July 11, 1733 - five months after General James Oglethorpe and his first 114 colonists. The other boat arrived on November 12, 1733, according to the Sheftall Diaries, a primary source document with entries from Mordecai Sheftall, a German Jewish passenger on the William and Sarah.

These Jewish colonists were the largest group of Jews ever to sail on one vessel for North America in colonial times, wrote Jacob R. Marcus in his study of The Colonial American Jew. They brought with them "a sefer Torah, with two cloaks, and a circumcision box, which were given to them by Mr. Lindo, a merchant in London, for the use of the congregation they intended to establish." Their first order of business was to establish Congregation Mickve Israel in Savannah, the third oldest Jewish congregation in America. They also established a Jewish cemetery on Bull Street on the northern end of downtown Savannah.

When Dr. Samuel Nunez arrived in Savannah, Georgia, there was an outbreak of yellow fever and many people were dying. After this ship landed, Captain Thomas Corain, one of General Oglethorpe's aides, wrote, "Georgia will soon become a Jewish colony." Captain Corain feared that if this news leaked out, rich Christians would not support the colony and poor Christians would not settle there. The London Trustees urged Oglethorpe to remove them. They had no legal basis for this request as Georgia's charter permitted all persons “liberty of conscience in the worship of God” except Catholics.

General Oglethorpe almost did not allow the Jewish immigrants to land. Dr. Nunez assured Oglethorpe that he was a doctor of infectious diseases and could help the colony. The Georgia colony had lost their doctor in April of that year, William Cox, and were much in need of a physician. Oglethorpe realized here was an opportunity for good help during this epidemic in Savannah, and he let the Jewish families remain. He also knew some of these Jews had a knowledge of agriculture acquired in Mediterranean lands. He wanted to use them as tools to create in Georgia a "Mediterranean colony of wine, olive oil, silk and indigo."

Dr. Nunez's arrival was very timely as there was an uncontrolled epidemic of "bloody flux" and "malignant fever" raging. Of the original 114 settlers, three more had died in June after their doctor's passing in April followed by four more in early July before Dr. Nunez's arrival. Although ten more died during July, those numbers rapidly diminished to two in August, four in September and one each during the last three months of that year.

The formal remedies at his disposal were limited and soon exhausted, but Dr. Nunez's training in botany helped him make use of indigenous plants and with great success. He used laudanum (opium) to control the "bloody flux" and lemon extract to treat the scurvy which appeared in debilitated patients. He employed ipecacuanha (emetine) empirically without knowing that it had a specific action on the amoeba histolytica. With infusions of cinchona bark (quinine), Dr. Nunez treated the "malignant fevers" considered in the medical texts of the period to originate from the evil night miasmas of the marshes. When his supply of chinchona bark was exhausted, Dr. Nunez used as substitutes the bark of white oak, red oak and dogwood. He used tartar emetic to produce vomiting in patients with food poisoning, jimson weed smoked in a pipe for asthma and sassafras root tea as a "purifier of blood."

The epidemic subsided, the colonists returned to their work, and Dr. Nunez at 65 built his home and settled his family. General Oglethorpe sent to the Trustees of the Colony a report of the help rendered by the first active practitioner of medicine in Georgia who also formed Georgia's first pharmacy. The Trustees instructed him not to give the Jews land grants, but Oglethorpe ignored them.

== Later years and death ==
Two years later, Dr. Nunez met John Wesley who arrived in Savannah with a commission from the Trustees, appointing him to the office of "priest of the Church Of England" to the Savannah mission. Rev. Wesley courted the society of this Sephardic Jew but had no illusions about the ease with which he could be converted to Christianity. Pastor Bolzius, the leader of the Salzburg Germans, and George Whitefield, another pioneer Methodist, had offered the Jews conversionist literature, which had been vigorously rejected.

Rev. Wesley exhibited a great interest in Dr. Nunez's medical practice and discussed with him the conduct and care of his patients. John Wesley, who became the founder of Methodism, wrote in his journal on April 4, 1737, "I began learning Spanish in order to converse with my Jewish parishioners, some of whom seem nearer the mind that was in Christ than many of those who call him Lord."

The London Trustees eventually showed their appreciation for Dr. Nunez by sending him "casks of wine and packets of drugs" to be used in treating the colonists. With "two barrels containing twenty-three deer skins, weight of Bears oil" and several parcels of "sea pod, make root, sassafras, china root, sumac, and contra-yerba," Dr. Nunez opened the first pharmacy in Georgia to compound his medications from imported and native-grown herbs.

When Spanish forces moved up the Georgia coast from Florida in 1740, Dr. Nunez and other Jewish-Portuguese settlers fled Savannah, fearing the Spanish Catholics would burn them at the stake for apostasy. Some of the refugees moved inland to Georgia's wild interior, while others went to Charleston, South Carolina. Dr. Nunez and his daughter Zipra were among those who left for Charleston.

They soon moved to New York City where Zipra's husband, Rev. David Mendes Machado, was the religious leader of Shearith Israel Synagogue. Samuel Nunez died in New York City in 1744 at the age of 76.

== Legacy ==
Many of Dr. Nunez's descendants and other family members became prominent in Savannah. One of Dr. Nunez's sons-in-law, Abraham De Lyon who was married to his daughter Esther, was experienced in "cultivating vines and making wine." Also a farmer who grew peas, grain and rice, De Lyon used his training as a viniculturist to raise "beautiful, almost transparent grapes" in Savannah from choice cuttings he brought with him from Portugal. He and the other colonists helped develop a 10-acre (40,000 m^{2}) tract as a Botanical Garden (Trustees Garden) near the southern end of Broad at Bay Streets near the Savannah River. They introduced to the colonists foreign plants with valuable medicinal properties and developed herbs which were native to Georgia.

Most of the Jewish able-bodied young men, needed in the militia. Oglethorpe appointed one, Benjamin Sheftall, a lieutenant in the militia.

His son Moses became a man of wealth and distinction and a member of Oglethorpe's Masonic Lodge. Moses served as an Indian interpreter and an agent for the Georgia Revolutionary forces. In his will of October 14, 1785, Moses divided his property equally among his children born to his first wife Rebecca Abraham (a son Samuel) and to his second wife Mulatto Rose (sons James, Robert and Alexander and daughter Frances Galphin).

Through Zipra, Dr. Nunez's second great-grandson, Commodore Uriah Phillips Levy, was one of the highest ranking naval officers of the Civil War. He is credited with abolishing the practice of flogging in the U.S. Navy. Commodore Levy purchased Thomas Jefferson's home Monticello when it was a disgraceful eyesore, restored it and, through his heirs, transferred it to the U.S. Government. He is known to be the first private citizen to restore an historic American residence. The Jewish chapel at the U.S. Naval Academy in Annapolis is named in Commodore Levy's honor.

Other distinguished descendants of Dr. Nunez include two more great-grandsons through his daughter Zipra. Considered the best known Jewish man in America during the first half of the nineteenth century, Mordecai Manuel Noah was a jurist, journalist, public servant, playwright and one of the founders of New York University. Major Raphael J. Moses, a Confederate officer, later became chairman of the Georgia House Judiciary Committee. An attorney from Columbus, Georgia, he is credited with establishing Georgia's peach industry.
