= Alberto Díaz Jr. =

United States Navy admiral (born 1943)

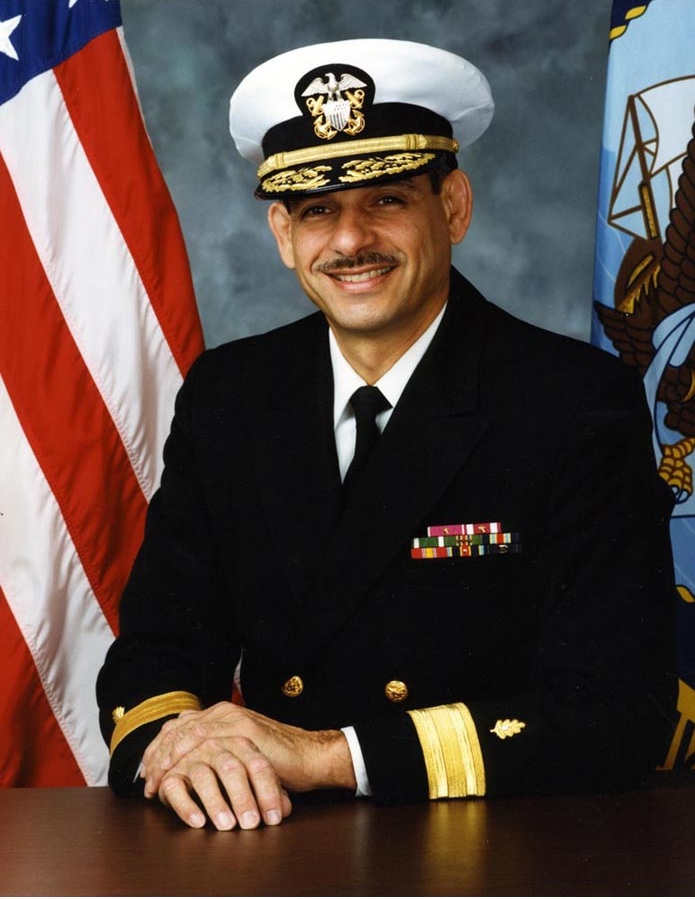
- Born: 1943 (age 82–83); San Juan, Puerto Rico
- Military career
- Branch: United States Navy
- Service years: 1976-2003
- Rank: Rear Admiral
- Commands: Director of the San Diego Naval District and Balboa Naval Hospital
- Conflicts: Gulf War
- Awards: Legion of Merit (2); Meritorious Service Medal (2)

Rear Admiral Alberto Díaz Jr. (born 1943) is the first Hispanic to become the Director of the San Diego Naval District and Balboa Naval Hospital.

== Early years ==
Díaz was born and raised in San Juan, the capital of Puerto Rico, where he received his primary education. He completed his secondary education at Cheshire Academy in Cheshire, Connecticut.

After he graduated from high school, he applied and was accepted at University of Rochester in upstate New York. Subsequently, he transferred to George Washington University in Washington, D.C., where he earned his Bachelor of Arts degree.

== Naval service ==
After earning his Bachelor of Arts degree, he enrolled at Butler University, in Indianapolis, Indiana, and earned a master's degree in psychology. Following that, he applied and was accepted to University of Barcelona Medical School in Barcelona, Spain.

After earning his medical degree, Díaz joined the United States Navy and in 1976 was commissioned an officer. While serving in the Navy, he continued his education, doing his internship and residency in psychiatry at Bethesda Naval Hospital in Washington, D.C.

His first post-graduate assignment in the Navy was Chief Resident at the Naval Center, Bethesda, Maryland. Then he was sent to the Naval Medical Regional Clinic, Marine Corps Development and Education Command, Quantico, Virginia, where he served as staff psychiatrist and Clinical Director of the Alcohol Rehabilitation Service.

Among other assignments which he has held are Chief, Department of Psychiatry as Fleet Liaison Officer and Chairman of the executive committee of the Medical Staff, Naval Hospital, Rota, Spain. Díaz established and served as Director of the Navy's only Alcohol Rehabilitation Service in Europe. During Operation Desert Storm, he was ordered to the 1st Medical Battalion, 1st FSSG, at Camp Pendleton, California.

== Naval Medical Center San Diego ==
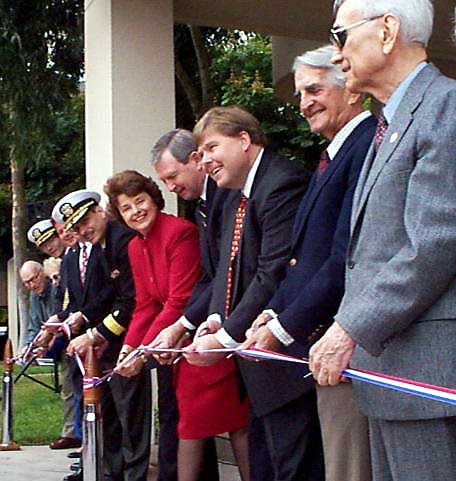
Admiral Al Díaz and Senator Dianne Feinstein helps "Get Underway" with TRICARE Senior Prime Pilot Program.

In 1998, Díaz was assigned as Commander of the Naval Medical Center, San Diego, becoming its first Hispanic Commander as well as Lead Agent TRICARE Region Nine. As Commander of the Naval Medical Center San Diego (NMCSD), he was in charge with providing leadership and management of the command, planning, directing and administering the operations of NMCSD.

He was also responsible for the professional care and services provided to the patients in the Medical Center.

As Lead Agent TRICARE Region Nine, his role was to advance the partnership and communication between the military health system leadership, military treatment facilities, the managed care support contractor and the civilian network to provide beneficiaries access to a high-quality integrated healthcare delivery system. In 1999 the appointment to Rear Admiral was confirmed by the senate.

Díaz held these positions until July 10, 2002, when he was transferred to Washington, D.C. and named Chief of Staff/Program Executive Officer Bureau of Medicine and Surgery. Díaz retired from the Navy on June 13, 2003, at a ceremony held at the National Naval Medical Center in Bethesda, Maryland.

== Later years ==
Rear Admiral Alberto Díaz Jr. retired from the United States Navy in 2003 and currently resides in Gaithersburg, Maryland with his family. He is a member of Annapolis Center Board of Directors and serves as a spokesman on the subject of health issues. In 2002, Hispanic Business magazine selected Díaz as one of the most influential Hispanics in the United States On February 12, 2004, SAIC's Enterprises (Science Applications Incorporated) and Health Solutions Business hired Díaz and five other retired senior military healthcare leaders to serve in its newly founded Military Health System.

== Awards and recognitions ==
Among the many awards and recognitions which Díaz has received are the following:

- Legion of Merit with Gold Star
- Meritorious Service Medal with Gold Star
- Navy and Marine Corps Commendation Medal
- Navy Meritorious Unit Commendation with 3 service stars
- Fleet Marine Force Ribbon
- National Defense Service Medal
- Navy and Marine Corps Overseas Service Ribbon
- Navy Expert Pistol Shot Medal (Pistol Marksmanship Ribbon with Expert Device)
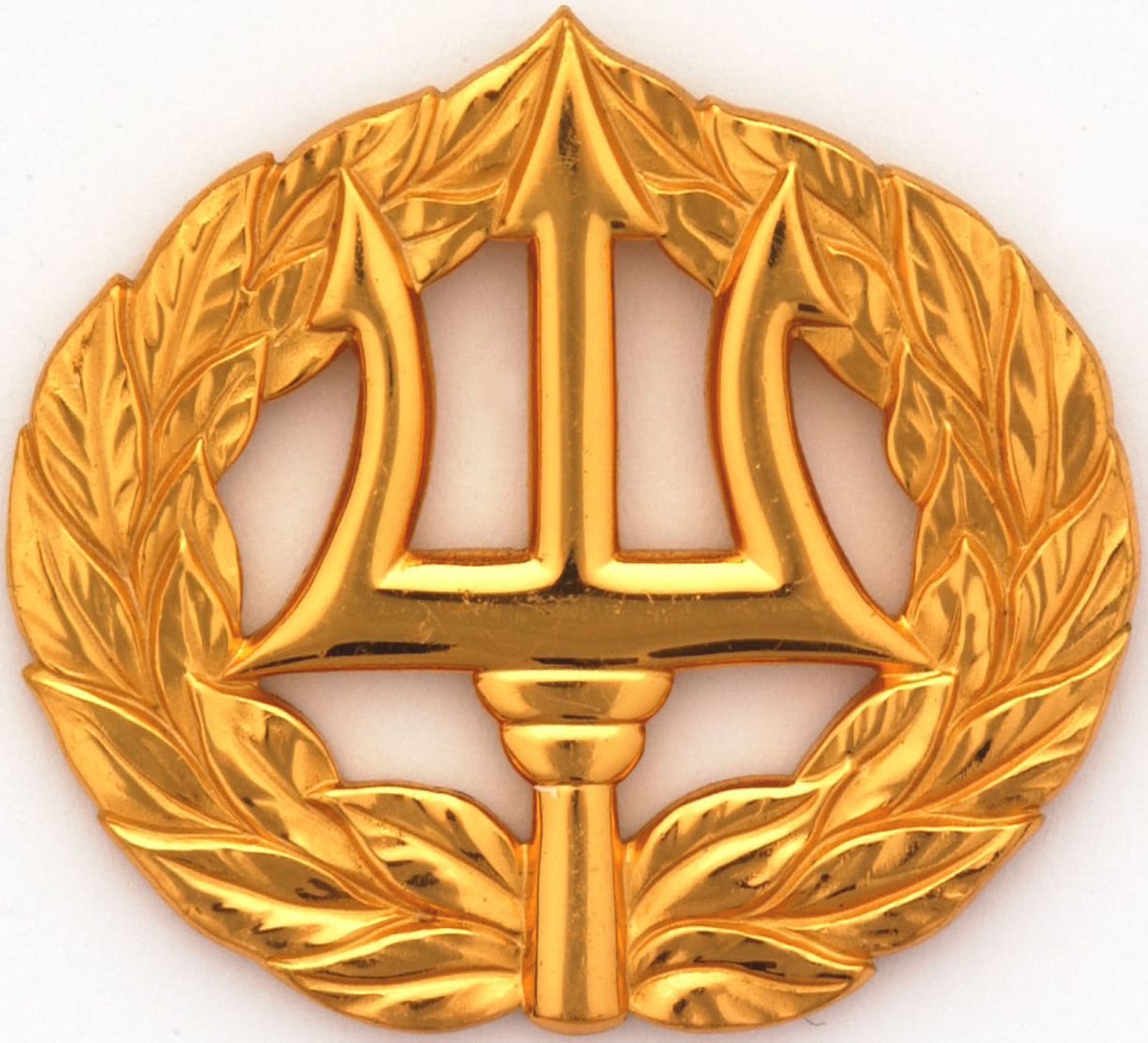
- Navy Command Ashore Insignia

== See also ==
- Hispanic Admirals in the United States Navy
- List of Puerto Ricans
- List of Puerto Rican military personnel
- Hispanics in the United States Navy
