= George E. Mayer =

United States admiral

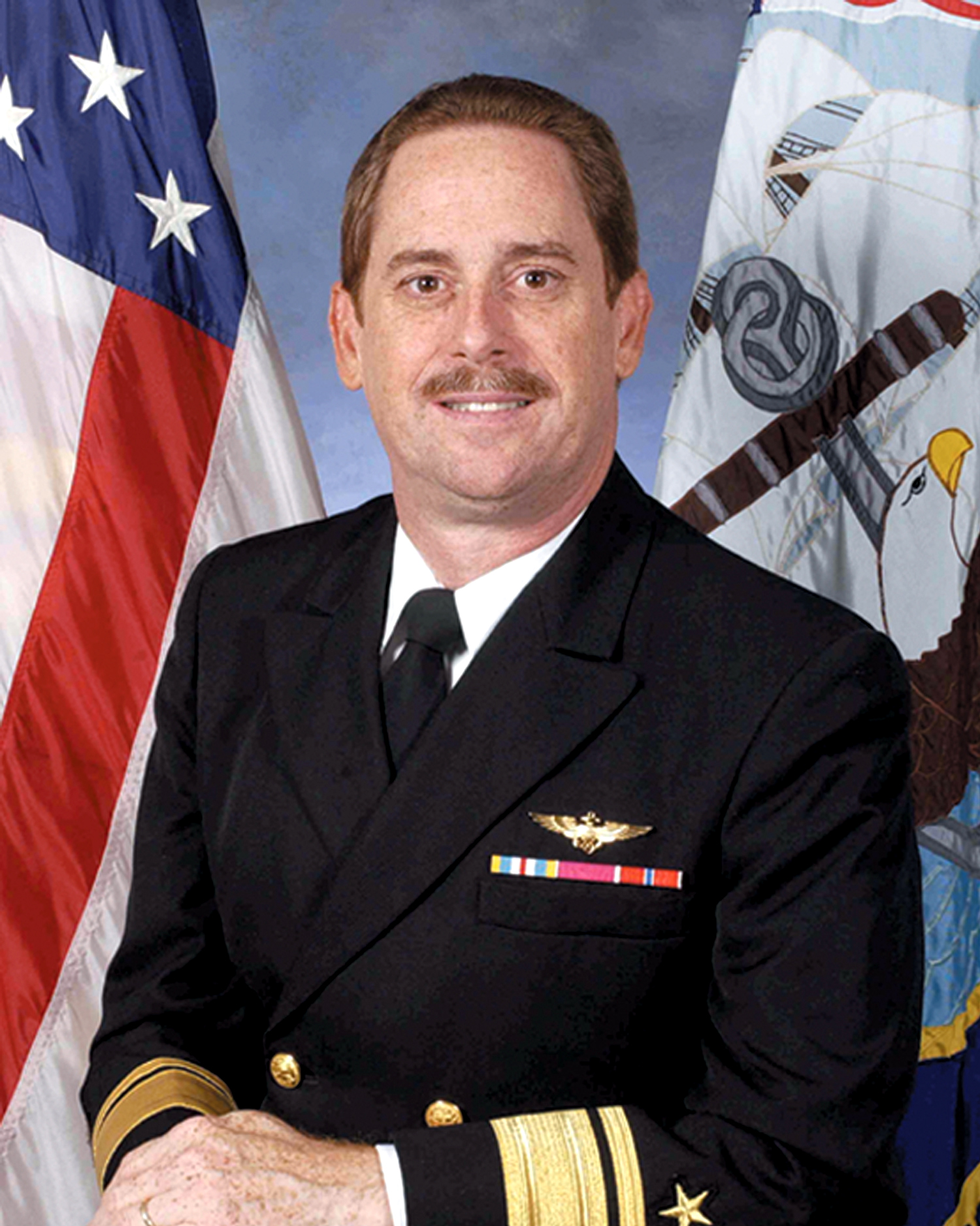
- Rear Admiral George E. Mayer
- Born: George Edward Mayer; August 26, 1952 (age 74); San Juan, Puerto Rico
- Military career
- Allegiance: United States of America
- Branch: United States Navy
- Service years: 1975-2007 (USNA 1971-1975)
- Rank: Rear Admiral
- Commands: Naval Safety Center; COMNAVREG SOUTH; CNATRA; COMCARGRU 8 CVW-7; VFA-106; VFA-83
- Conflicts: Operation Enduring Freedom
- Awards: Defense Superior Service Medal; Legion of Merit with two Gold Stars; Bronze Star; Meritorious Service Medal with Gold Star

Rear Admiral George E. "Rico" Mayer (born August 26, 1952) is a retired United States Naval officer and Naval Aviator. At the time of his retirement, he was the first Puerto Rican Commander of the Naval Safety Center.

== Early years ==
Mayer was born and raised in San Juan, Puerto Rico, the island's capital. There he received his primary and secondary education. In the 1960s, during his teenage years, he was unsure of what type of work he would like to do as an adult. This changed as he visited his father who worked at the local airport. Mayer became fascinated with aviation and decided that he would like to become an aviator. His father recommended that he join the Navy and become a Naval Aviator.

== United States Naval Academy ==
Mayer was accepted to the United States Naval Academy, graduating from the Naval Academy in 1975 with a Bachelor of Science degree in Political Science. Upon graduation, he was designated as a Student Naval Aviator and assigned to flight training. Selected for advanced flight training in the Strike training pipeline, he earned his pilot's wings as a Naval Aviator following graduation from Training Air Wing One at Naval Air Station Meridian, Mississippi in 1976.

As a Naval Aviator, he was initially qualified in the carrier-based A-7 Corsair II attack aircraft and later qualified in the F/A-18 Hornet strike fighter.

== Naval career ==
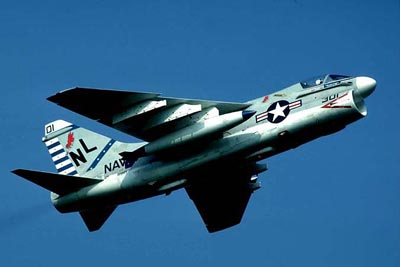
A-7E Corsair - First combat aircraft that RADM Mayer flew

Following transitional training with the Pacific Fleet A-7 Fleet Replacement Squadron, Attack Squadron 122 (VA-122), Mayer initially flew the A-7E Corsair II with the "Dambusters" of Attack Squadron 195 (VA-195) at Naval Air Station Lemoore, California, deploying with the Pacific Fleet. He would later fly with other NAS Lemoore-based squadrons, the "Fist of the Fleet" of Attack Squadron 25 (VA-25) and the "Flying Eagles" of VA-122, the latter as an A-7 instructor pilot. Subsequent flying assignments took him to Naval Air Station Cecil Field, Florida for recurrent training with the "Hellrazors" of Attack Squadron 174 (VA-174) followed by assignment to the "Gunslingers" of Attack Squadron 105 (VA-105), where he deployed with the Atlantic Fleet. He then transitioned to the F/A-18 Hornet for his command tour with the "Rampagers" of Strike Fighter Squadron 83 (VFA-83), also based at NAS Cecil Field. He has accumulated over 4,000 flight hours and logged more than 1,000 carrier-arrested landings.

Mayer served in the following shore duty assignments: Executive Assistant to the Chief of Legislative Affairs; Light Attack/Strike Fighter Junior Officer Detailer with the Navy's Bureau of Personnel (BUPERS) in Washington, D.C.; Spanish Command and Staff College in Madrid, Spain; the U.S. Naval War College in Newport, Rhode Island, where he obtained a master's degree in National Security and Strategic Studies. Promoted to rear admiral (lower half), his first flag officer assignment was as Deputy Director of Operations (DJ3) at Headquarters, United States Central Command, MacDill Air Force Base, Florida. On September 11, 2001, while serving as Deputy Director of Operations at U.S. Central Command, he was quickly thrust into a major leadership role during the planning and execution of Operation Enduring Freedom. On February 15, 2002, Secretary of Defense Donald H. Rumsfeld announced that President George W. Bush had promoted him to the grade of Rear Admiral (Upper Half).

Rear Admiral Mayer's other command tours included commanding officer of the Atlantic Fleet F/A-18 Fleet Replacement Squadron, the "Gladiators" of Strike Fighter Squadron 106 (VFA-106); Commander, Carrier Air Wing Seven (CVW-7); Commander, Carrier Group Eight (COMCARGRU 8); and a dual command assignment as both Commander, Navy Region South (COMNAVREG SOUTH), responsible for all naval shore installations in northwest Florida, Alabama, Mississippi, Tennessee, Louisiana, and Texas, and Chief of Naval Air Training (CNATRA), responsible for the entire Naval Air Training Command, to include all naval flight training schools, training air wings and training squadrons in Florida, Mississippi and Texas. He assumed command of the Naval Safety Center in August 2005 and relinquished command and retired from the U.S. Navy in October 2007.

== BALTOPS 2003 ==
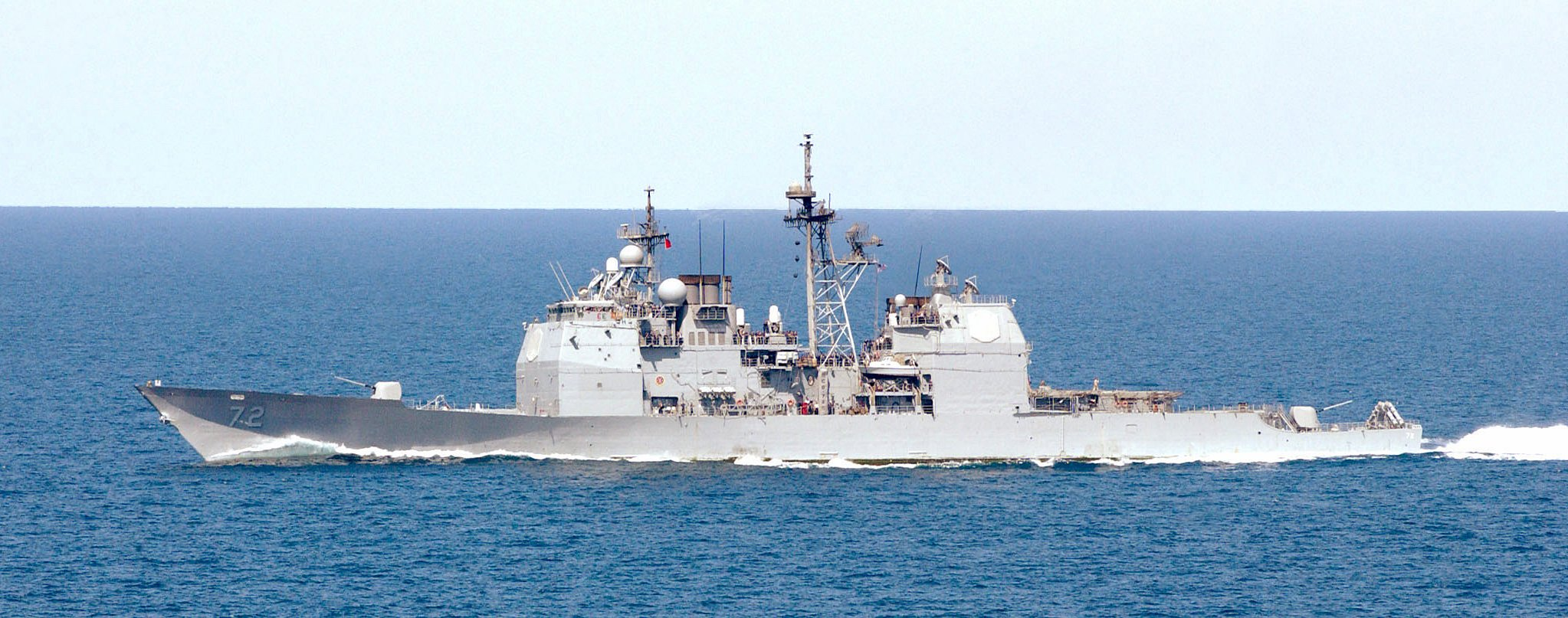
USS Vella Gulf (CG-72)

Mayer commanded Carrier Group Eight, later renamed Carrier Strike Group Eight, whose base of operations is located in Norfolk, Virginia. During this tour, he led an international naval exercise known as Baltic Operations (BALTOPS) 2003 from his flagship, the USS Vella Gulf (CG-72). Thirteen nations participated in the exercise, which included more than 3,600 personnel, 36 ships, 3 submarines, over 40 aircraft, and 6 different ground forces from Allied and Partnership for Peace (PfP) nations which included Denmark, Estonia, Finland, France, Germany, Latvia, Lithuania, Norway, Poland, Russia, Sweden, the United Kingdom and the United States. It was the first time in the 31-year history of BALTOPS that the exercise included combined ground troops from Russia, Poland, Denmark and the United States.

For the first time in the history of the exercise, BALTOPS 03 included ground force elements that trained in interoperability exercises, which included a combined Russian, Polish, Danish and American amphibious landings in Poland and an evacuation of role-playing non-combatants by both sea and air from Bornholm, Denmark.

== Final Command ==
In August 2005, Mayer was assigned as Commander, Naval Safety Center in Norfolk, Virginia. As commander, he was responsible for the center's mission of providing safety assistance and advice to the Chief of Naval Operations (CNO), the Commandant of the Marine Corps (CMC), and the Deputy Assistant Secretary of the Navy for Safety in order to enhance the war fighting capability of the United States Navy and United States Marine Corps, preserve resources and improve combat readiness by preventing mishaps and saving lives.

Mayer has been a strong advocate of Hispanic recruitment and active participation in the United States Armed Forces and has been quoted as saying:

One of the biggest strengths of the Hispanic community is its ability to produce leaders in all facets of society and industry.

== Recognition ==
On October 7, 2005, based on his service as former Chief of Naval Air Training and as Commander, Naval Safety Center, Rear Admiral Mayer was recognized as one of the nation's best and brightest engineers and scientists during the 17th Annual Hispanic Engineers National Achievement Awards Conference in Anaheim, California, where he received the program's military executive excellence award.

In 2022 George E. Mayer was inducted to the Puerto Rico Veterans Hall of Fame.

== Military decorations and awards ==
Among Rear Admiral Mayer's military decorations are the following:

Naval Aviator Badge
| 1st Row | Navy Distinguished Service Medal | Defense Superior Service Medal | Legion of Merit w/ two gold stars |
| 2nd Row | Bronze Star | Meritorious Service Medal w/ one gold star | Navy and Marine Corps Commendation Medal |
| 3rd Row | Navy Achievement Medal | Navy Unit Commendation | Navy E Ribbon ("Battle E") |
| 4th Row | Navy Fleet Marine Force Ribbon | Navy Expeditionary Medal | National Defense Service Medal w/ two bronze stars |
| 5th Row | Armed Forces Expeditionary Medal | Global War on Terrorism Service Medal | Armed Forces Service Medal |
| 6th Row | Humanitarian Service Medal | Navy Sea Service Deployment Ribbon w/ four bronze stars | Navy Overseas Service Ribbon |

== See also ==
- List of Puerto Ricans
- List of Puerto Rican military personnel
- German immigration to Puerto Rico
- Hispanic Admirals in the United States Navy
- Hispanics in the United States Naval Academy
- Hispanics in the United States Navy
