= Raphael J. Moses =

American businessman and politician

Raphael Jacob Moses
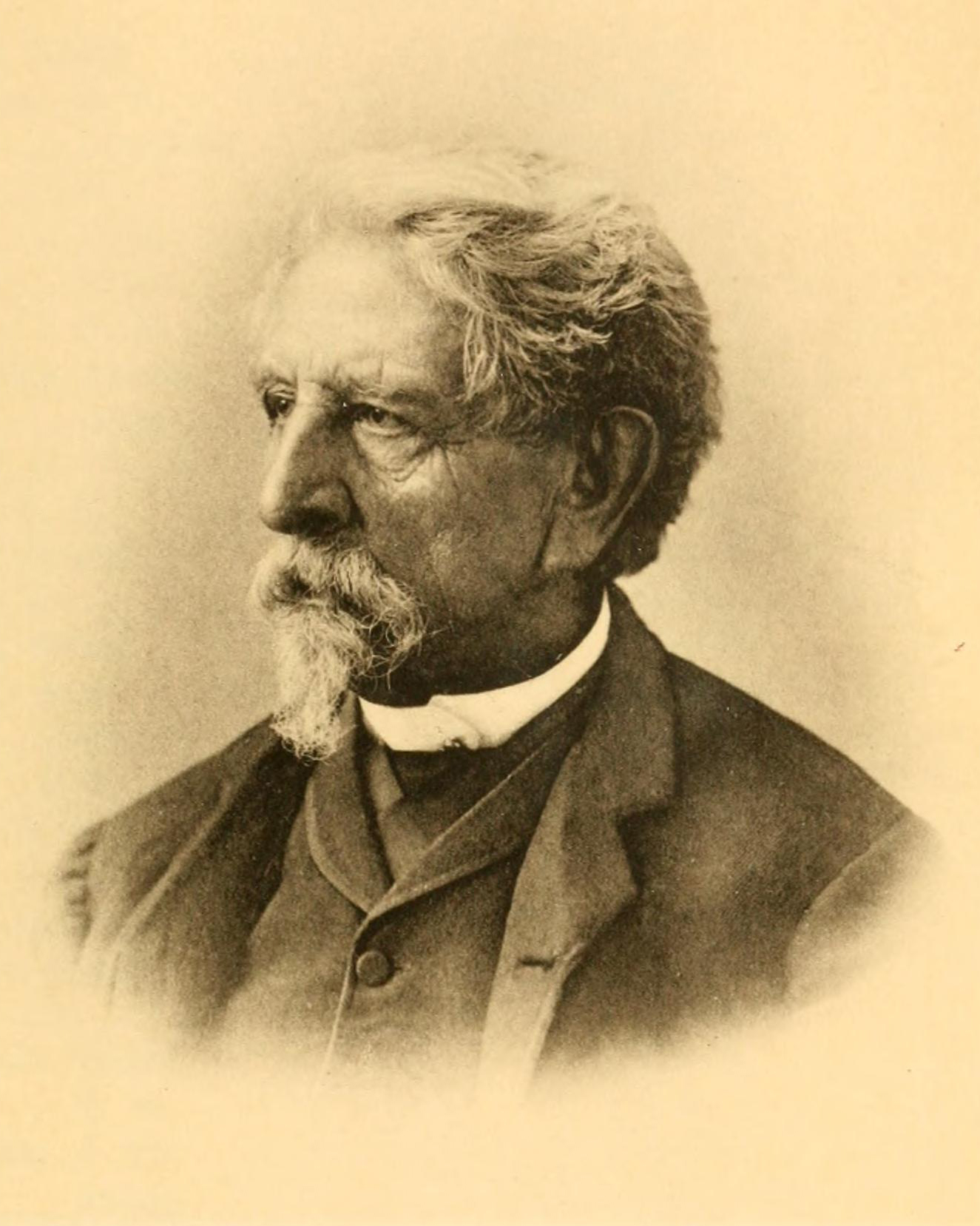
- Born: January 20, 1812; Charleston, South Carolina
- Died: October 13, 1893 (aged 81); Brussels, Belgium
- Burial place: Columbus, Georgia
- Spouse: Eliza Matilda Moses
- Relatives: Edwin Warren Moïse (nephew)
- Military career
- Allegiance: Confederate States of America
- Branch: Confederate States Army
- Service years: 1861–1865
- Rank: Major
- Unit: First Corps, Army of Northern Virginia
- Conflicts: American Civil War
- Other work: Lawyer, planter, politician

Major Raphael Jacob Moses (January 20, 1812 – 1893) was an American lawyer, planter, and politician who served in the Confederate States Army during the American Civil War.

== Biography ==
=== Early life ===
Moses was born in 1812 to a prominent Jewish-American family in Charleston, South Carolina. His family fought in the American Revolutionary War of 1775–1783, and he was a fifth-generation South Carolinian. His father was Israel Moses and his mother, Deborah Cohen. He grew up in Charleston.

=== Career ===
He practiced as a lawyer in St. Joseph, Florida, and Apalachicola, Florida, settling down in Columbus, Georgia, in 1848.

He purchased The Esquiline, a plantation named after Esquiline Hill in Rome, Italy and located in what is now known as the neighborhood of Benning Hills in Columbus, Georgia. He owned fifty slaves in 1850 and sixty slaves by 1860. He pioneered the commercial growing of peaches on his plantation, becoming one of the first merchants to ship them to the North (New York City) in 1851. He shipped his peaches in champagne baskets instead of shipping them in containers of pulverized charcoal, the standard method at that time. The result was a fresher peach, which proved very popular with consumers.

In the late 1850s, he became an outspoken proponent of secession. During the American Civil War of 1861–1865, he served as the chief commissary officer for Generals Robert Toombs and James Longstreet in the Confederate States Army (CSA). As such, he was responsible for providing food and supplies to 54,000 Confederate troops and personnel. He was also a confidant of Confederate General Robert E. Lee, especially during the Battle of Gettysburg as witness by Arthur Lyon Fremantle on July 1–3, 1863. On May 5, 1865, he attended the last meeting of the Confederate States of America government at the Bank of the State of Georgia (later the Heard House) and carried out its last order. It was then that Confederate Jefferson Davis instructed him to take US$40,000 in gold and silver bullions from the Confederate Treasury to feed and clothe the defeated Confederate soldiers. His three sons served in the CSA as well.

After the war, he returned to law practice in Columbus, Georgia. He was, however, greatly impoverished by the Confederate defeat, as his wealth plummeted from $55,000 in 1860 to $35,000 in 1870. Moreover, fifty-nine of his sixty slaves left his plantation. He had a dispute with William Hugh Young and lobbied against Eagle & Phenix, Young's business vehicle. Additionally, he became an outspoken critic of the Republican-led Reconstruction efforts in Georgia and the South.

He was later elected to the Georgia House of Representatives and was Chair of the Judiciary Committee. Shortly after he was elected, he declared, "I wanted to go to congress as a Jew and because I...would have liked in a public position to confront and do my part towards breaking down the prejudice." He added, "I feel it an honor to be of a race whom persecution can not crush, whom prejudice has in vain endeavored to subdue."

In 1892, he wrote his autobiography.

=== Personal life ===
He married Eliza Matilda Moses (1812–1892), the daughter of Isaac Clifton Moses (1781–1834) and Hannah Lazarus Moses (1783–1835). They had six children:

- Hannah Maria Moses (1840–1860).
- Albert Moses Luria (1842–1862) killed at the Battle of Seven Pines, aged 19.
- Raphael J. Moses Jr. (1844–1909).
- Penina Septima Moses Robison (1846–1921).
- Isabel Adeline Moses Levy (1850–1934).
- Israel Moses Nunez (1838–1905) died in Texas.

=== Death ===
He died on October 13, 1893, in Brussels, Belgium.
