= Pedro Cavadas =

Pedro Cavadas may refer to:

- Pedro Cavadas (surgeon) (born 1965), Spanish surgeon
- Pedro Cavadas (footballer) (born 1992), Portuguese footballer
