= Cavadas (surname) =

Cavadas is a surname. Notable people with the surname include:

- Pedro Cavadas (surgeon) (born 1965), Spanish surgeon
- Pedro Cavadas (footballer) (born 1992), Portuguese footballer

== See also ==
- Cavadas, locations
- Cavada
