= Libby Prison escape =

Richmond, Virginia Prison Escape

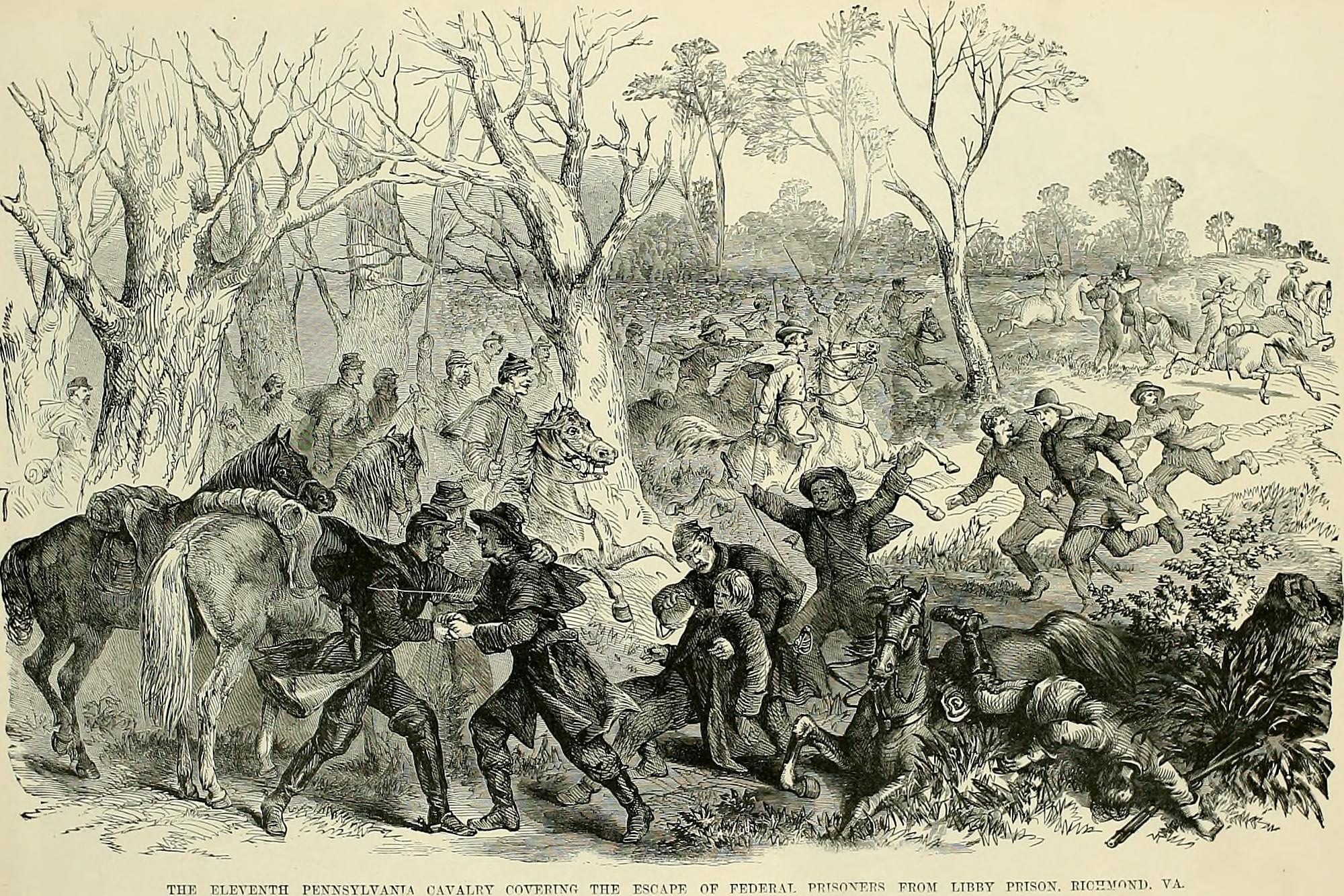
Illustration of the 11th Pennsylvania Cavalry covering the escape of Federal prisoners from Libby Prison, Richmond, Virginia (February 1864)

The Libby Prison escape was a prison escape from Libby Prison, a Confederate prison at Richmond, Virginia, in February 1864 that saw over 100 Union prisoners-of-war escape from captivity. It was one of the most successful prison breaks of the American Civil War.

Led by Colonel Thomas E. Rose of the 77th Pennsylvania Infantry, the prisoners started tunnelling in a rat-infested zone which the Confederate guards were reluctant to enter. The tunnel emerged in a vacant lot beside a warehouse, from where the escapees could walk out through the gate without arousing suspicion. Since the prison was believed to be escape-proof, there was less vigilance by the authorities than in other camps, and the alarm was not raised for nearly 12 hours. Over half the prisoners were able to reach Union lines, helped by their familiarity with the terrain after serving in McClellan's Peninsula Campaign of 1862.

== Background ==
At the outbreak of the Civil War, Luther Libby was running a ship supply shop from the corner of a large warehouse in Richmond, Virginia. In need of a new prison for captured Union officers, Confederate soldiers gave Libby 48 hours to evacuate his property. The sign over the north-west corner reading "L. Libby & Son, Ship Chandlers" was never removed, and consequently the building and prison bore his name. Since the Confederates believed the building inescapable, the staff considered their job relatively easy.

== Location and layout ==
Libby Prison encompassed an entire city block in Richmond. To the north lay Cary Street, connecting the prison area to the rest of the city. On the south side ran the James River. The prison itself stood three stories above ground with a basement exposed on the river side. Confederate soldiers whitewashed the outer walls to make lurking prisoners instantly recognizable.

The first floor of Libby Prison housed the various offices of the Confederate guard unit; the second and third floors were partitioned as inmate holding areas. The basement of the prison was divided into three sections. The western end was a storage cellar, the middle section was a carpenter's shop used by civilians, and the eastern end was an abandoned kitchen. This kitchen in the eastern section was once used by Union inmates, but an infestation of rats and constant flooding compelled the Confederates to close it off. The abandoned area became known as "Rat Hell."

=== Rat Hell ===
Though most of the prisoners (and guards alike) did what they could to avoid Rat Hell, a handful of Union officers schemed to break in. By removing a stove on the first floor and chipping their way into the adjoining chimney, the officers constructed a cramped but effective passage for access to the eastern basement. Once access between the two floors was established, the officers set about plans to tunnel their way out.

The floor of Rat Hell was covered in two feet of straw. This straw was a bane and a blessing for the officers. On one hand, it provided a perfect hiding place for the dirt excavated from the tunnel. Captain I. N. Johnston, who spent more time in Rat Hell than any other Union officer, commented, "I have been asked a thousand times how we contrived to hide such a quantity of earth as the digging of a tunnel of that size would dislodge. [On the floor] we made a wide and deep opening...in this the loose dirt was closely packed, and then nicely covered with straw." By such means, the Union officers were able to conceal all signs of the tunnel that might tip off civilians and wandering sentries. The straw in Rat Hell also provided a convenient hiding place for workers during the day.

One man was chosen to conceal all signs of the tunnel while the digging party scrambled up to the first floor. He would then remain buried in the straw for the remainder of the day until the next relief arrived at dusk. Johnston wrote, "...There was a large quantity [of straw] there, and but for which our undertaking must have been discovered nearly as soon as begun." As helpful as the straw might have been, it was nevertheless the main reason for the nickname, Rat Hell. Lt. Charles H. Moran, a recaptured officer from Libby, wrote, "No tongue can tell...how the poor fellow[s] passed among the squealing rats,—enduring the sickening air, the deathly chill, the horrible interminable darkness."

Major A. G. Hamilton, a leading founder of the escape party, pointed to the dilemma of the rats: "The only difficulties experienced [were lack of proper tools] and the unpleasant feature of having to hear hundreds of rats squeal all the time, while they ran over the diggers almost without a sign of fear." Colonel Thomas E. Rose, the leader of the escape, addressed the double-edged lack of light in Rat Hell: "The profound darkness caused some...to become bewildered when they attempted to move about. I sometimes had to feel all over the cellar to gather up the men that were lost." Despite the difficulties, the dark repugnant atmosphere of Rat Hell offered the most effective cover. "On rare occasions, guards entered the large basement rooms. 'This was, however, so uninviting a place, that the Confederates made this visit as brief as nominal compliance with their orders permitted...'"

== Element of surprise ==
The tunnelers organized into three relief teams with five members each. After 17 days of digging, they succeeded in breaking through to a 50-foot vacant lot on the eastern side of the prison, resurfacing beneath a tobacco shed inside the grounds of the nearby Kerr's Warehouse. When Col. Rose finally broke through to the other side, he told his men that the "Underground Railroad to God's Country was open!" The officers escaped the prison in groups of two and three on the night of February 9, 1864. Once within the tobacco shed, the men collected inside the walled warehouse yard and simply strolled out the front gate.

Union officers meandering through the streets of Richmond late at night might appear to doom the plan to failure, however, the guards simply did not expect that escape from Libby prison was possible. The fact that the Libby guards were not looking for signs of escape meant that they were in a position to be more easily deceived. Union Army Lieutenant Moran described how the sentries were not interested in stopping people outside the bounds of their jurisdiction, "provided, of course, that the retreating form...were not recognized as Yankees." The tunnel provided enough distance from the prison to stealthily subvert those jurisdictional lines and allow prisoners to slip into the dark streets unchallenged.

So effective was this buffer that 109 men escaped the prison without ever being stopped. At one point, Colonel Rose walked straight into the path of an oncoming sentinel. Unflinching, he "strode boldly past the guard unchallenged." Once news of the escape broke out among the prisoners, a panicked rush resulted, creating a thunderous stampede for the tunnel. Wholly unsuspecting of the reality of the situation, one Confederate guard yelled out to a fellow sentry, "Halloa, Bill—there's somebody's coffeepot upset, sure!"

Libby Prison close-up

=== Precious time ===
Another example of how unaware the Confederates were is evident in the reaction to the escape. From the Richmond Examiner, February 11, 1864: "At first it was suspicioned [sic] that the night sentinels had been bribed. They were placed under arrest, searched ... for evidences of their criminality, [and] confined in Castle Thunder (a civilian penitentiary near Libby Prison). Upon the testimony afforded by the revelation of the tunnel, the imprisoned guards were at once released and restored to duty."

Despite the stampeding of prisoners, strong senior officers such as Colonel Harrison C. Hobart had the presence of mind to tie off the flow of escapees before dawn's light. "The remaining prisoners replaced the bricks at the fireplace, and the guards began their morning routine, unaware that 109 escaped Union officers were making their way toward the Federal lines." Keeping the escape secret from the Confederate guards until the last possible moment gave the evading inmates what they needed most: time. After the morning roll call came up over a hundred short, the Confederates counted frantically several more times to ensure that the Yankees weren't pulling a trick. Such "tricks" had occurred on many occasions when men slipped in and out of the counting lines; this "repeating" was a mild prank often used to frustrate the Confederates at roll call, much to the glee of the Union prisoners.

On the morning of February 10, the Confederates realized that this was no trick. By this time, the first prisoners had been loose for nearly twelve hours. Frenzy broke out among the Confederates: "Messengers and dispatches were soon flying in all directions, and all the horse, foot, and dragoons of Richmond were in pursuit of the fugitives before noon." Despite the mobilization of Richmond, almost 17 hours passed before the Confederates could respond. This no doubt added greatly to the window of opportunity that helped 59 men reach Union lines. The Richmond Enquirer of February 11, 1864 expressed such a sentiment: "It is feared that [the fugitives] have gotten rather too much the start of the pursuers to admit anything like the recapture of them all." Of the 109 escapees, 48 were recaptured, and 2 drowned in the nearby James River.

=== Prior reconnaissance ===
Though Union Commander George B. McClellan received little more than defeat in the Peninsular Campaign of 1862, his men received something more. For those who would break out of Libby prison, the time spent studying maps and hoofing ground in Virginia familiarized them with the enemy terrain. Such intelligence was of great benefit to the prisoners forging their way back to the Federal lines two years later. The Richmond Enquirer reported, "It is supposed that the direction taken by them all – if, indeed all have left the city – was towards the Peninsula..." Lieutenant Moran, who escaped late in the night, wrote, "I had served with McClellan in the Peninsula campaign of 1862, I knew the country well from my frequent inspection of war maps, and the friendly north star gave me my bearings."

Just as slaves had been following the North Star to freedom, it also guided the escaped Union prisoners from Libby in 1864. Most of the prisoners made reference to following the North Star, such as Captain Johnston who wrote, "I ... started due north, taking the north star for my guide, changing my course only when [I] came near any of the [Rebel] camps."

=== Leaders ===
Colonel Rose and Major Hamilton led the escape efforts. Rose, wounded at the Battle of Chickamauga, arrived at the prison on October 1, 1863. From the moment he stepped in the door, he was bent on escape. While exploring the darker regions of Rat Hell, he happened upon Hamilton, who was also searching for a proper tunneling point. Soon fast friends, the two worked toward the successful escape in February. Libby prisoners showered Rose with admiration and credit for the escape's success.

Rose and Hamilton worked tirelessly together to bring about the escape. Rose thought of breaking into the basement from the chimney, while Hamilton engineered the passage. Rose toiled feverishly in the tunnel and organized digging teams while Hamilton worked out the logistics and invented contraptions for removing dirt and supplying oxygen to the tunnel. Various setbacks plagued the tunneling effort but as Lieutenant Moran recorded, "the undaunted Rose, aided by Hamilton, [always] persuaded the men to another effort, and soon the knives and toy saws were at work again with vigor." Lieutenant Colonel Federico Fernández Cavada, a prisoner at Libby, wrote, "To Colonel Rose is chiefly due the credit [for the escape]... Animated by an unflinching earnestness of purpose, unwearying perseverance, and no ordinary engineering abilities, he organized ... working parties [which] he conducted every night [in] the cellars of the prison." "[Rose] was the acknowledged leader of the tunnel party, the acknowledged projector of the tunnel," maintained Hamilton, "and it was through his good sense, energy, and management ... that the escape was a success."

Despite his work in planning the escape, Rose was captured before reaching Federal lines. Minutes from an advancing Union front at Williamsburg, he was ambushed by Confederate pickets and wrestled back to Libby Prison. Though placed in solitary confinement, the Confederates felt Rose's presence at Libby now presented a danger. Given the chance, they gladly traded the famed escapist for a Confederate colonel on April 30, 1864. Rose returned to his unit, the 77th Pennsylvania Infantry, and fought to the end of the war.

== Effect ==
To judge the success of the Libby Prison escape solely by the number of men who crossed Federal lines would be a mistake. Richmond was deeply affected by the break, and Libby Prison itself was thrown into chaos, much to the satisfaction and morale of the remaining prisoners. Lieutenant Colonel Cavada recorded some of the more humorous effects of the escape inside the prison. On one occasion, the entire camp was roused in the middle of the night for a roll call because a sentry thought he saw something down in a sewer. It turned out to be his own shadow. Even the Confederate warden, Major Thomas P. Turner, was visibly shaken. Cavada commented, "Really, when our distracted little Commandant now comes into our rooms, he keeps his knees well together, it is necessary to be very cautious, some of us might slip out between his legs!"

== In popular culture ==
A melodramatic play about the escape entitled A Fair Rebel, by Harry P. Mawson, premiered in New York City in December 1889 at the Star Theatre and was later staged on Broadway at the Fourteenth Street Theatre in August 1891. In 1914, a 3-reel silent film version was released starring Linda Arvidson, Charles Perley, and Dorothy Gish, and directed by Frank Powell.

Episode Number 25 of The Great Adventure (American TV series) (1964) presents a dramatisation of the Libby Prison escape.

The escape is in the television series History's Greatest Escapes with Morgan Freeman season 2 episode 7 (2024).
