= Cavada =

Cavada is a surname. Notable people with the surname include:

- Adolfo Fernández Cavada (1832–1871), Cuban-born American Civil War veteran and diplomat
- Carlos Oviedo Cavada (1927–1998), Chilean Roman Catholic cardinal
- Federico Fernández Cavada (1831–1871), American Civil War veteran and diplomat
- José Alfonso Cavada (1832–1909), Chilean politician

== See also ==
- Cavadas (surname)
