= Harry P. Mawson =

American dramatist (1853–1914)

Harry Phillips Mawson (August 27, 1853 – April 20, 1914) was an American dramatist and writer for magazines. A native of Philadelphia, he penned two plays which were staged on Broadway: A Fair Rebel and Little Nell and the Marchioness.

== Life and career ==
The son of Edward T. Mawson and Ellen Mawson, Harry Phillips Mawson was born in Philadelphia, Pennsylvania on August 27, 1853. In the 1870s he was a member of the Philadelphia chapter of the Young Men's Hebrew Association. He began his career writing for American magazines; including articles for Harper's Weekly. He authored the play A Fair Rebel; a military drama which was based on the Libby Prison escape during the American Civil War in which 109 imprisoned men from the Union Army escaped from the Confederate Libby Prison in 1864. It premiered in December 1889 at the Star Theatre in New York City (located at Broadway and 13th Street). The cast included his brother, the actor Edwin R. Mawson. The show subsequently toured nationally; including returning to New York for a Broadway run at the Fourteenth Street Theatre in 1891. It was later revived in New York in 1901.

In 1891 Mawson was a founding member of the American Dramatists Club (precursor to the Dramatists Guild of America). He served in the National Guard of the United States during a series of labor strikes in 1892. From this experience he concluded, "organized labor within the past six weeks has shown itself to be synonymous with organized lawlessness". With J. W. Buel he co-authored Leslie's Official History of the Spanish-American War which was published by the War Records Office of the United States in 1899. In 1900 he adapted Charles Dickens's fourth novel, The Old Curiosity Shop, for the stage. Titled Little Nell and the Marchioness, it premiered at the Tremont Theatre in Boston on 22 January 1900. It transferred to Broadway where it ran at the Herald Square Theatre in March and April 1900.

He wrote a short biography of dramatist Bronson Howard which was published in In MemoriamL Bronson Howard, 1842-1908; Founder and President of the American Dramatists Club (1910, Marion Press). He also penned campaign literature for William McKinley, and contributed work to The New York Tribune. His final play, Her Own Boss, was accepted by theatre manager Fred C. Whitney for production shortly before his death.

Mawson died at his home at 607 W. 136th St. in New York City on April 20, 1914. He was survived by his wife, Rachel B. Mawson.
