= 77th Pennsylvania Infantry Regiment =

Union Army infantry regiment

77th Pennsylvania Volunteer Infantry
- Active: October 15, 1861, to December 6, 1865
- Country: United States
- Allegiance: Union
- Branch: Infantry
- Engagements: Battle of Shiloh; Siege of Corinth; Battle of Stones River; Tullahoma Campaign; Battle of Chickamauga; Siege of Chattanooga; Atlanta campaign Battle of Resaca; Battle of Kennesaw Mountain; Siege of Atlanta; Battle of Jonesboro; Second Battle of Franklin; Battle of Nashville

The 77th Pennsylvania Volunteer Infantry was an infantry regiment that served in the Union Army during the American Civil War.

== Service ==
The 77th Pennsylvania Infantry was organized at Pittsburgh, Pennsylvania and mustered in for a three-year enlistment on October 15, 1861, under the command of Colonel Frederick S. Stumbaugh.

The regiment was attached to Negley's 4th Brigade, McCook's Command, at Nolin, Army of the Ohio, to November 1861. 5th Brigade, Army of the Ohio, to December 1861. 5th Brigade, 2nd Division, Army of the Ohio, to September 1862. 2nd Brigade, 2nd Division, Right Wing, Army of the Cumberland, to January 1863. 2nd Brigade, 2nd Division, XX Corps, Army of the Cumberland, to October 1863. 3rd Brigade, 1st Division, IV Corps, Army of the Cumberland, to June 1865. 1st Brigade, 1st Division, IV Corps, to August 1865. Department of Texas to December 1865.

The 77th Pennsylvania Infantry mustered out of service at Victoria, Texas, on December 6, 1865.

== Detailed service ==
Left Pennsylvania for Louisville, Ky., October 18. Camp at Nolin River until December 1861, and at Munfordsville, Ky., until February 1862. March to Bowling Green, Ky., thence to Nashville, Tenn., February 14 – March 3, and to Savannah, Tenn., March 16-April 6. Battle of Shiloh, Tenn., April 6–7. Duty at Pittsburg Landing until May 28. Siege of Corinth, Miss., May 28–30. Skirmish near Corinth May 9. Pursuit to Booneville May 31-June 1. Buell's Campaign in northern Alabama and middle Tennessee June to August. March to Louisville, Ky., in pursuit of Bragg August 21 – September 26. Pursuit of Bragg into Kentucky October 1–22. Floyd's Fork October 1. Near Clay Village October 4. Dog Walk October 9. March to Nashville, Tenn., October 22 – November 7. Reconnaissance toward Lavergne November 19 and November 26–27. Lavergne, Scrougesville November 27. Advance on Murfreesboro December 26–30. Triune, Tenn., December 27. Battle of Stones River December 30–31 and January 1–3, 1863. Duty near Murfreesboro until June. Tullahoma Campaign June 23-July 7. Liberty Gap June 24–27. Occupation of middle Tennessee until August 16. Passage of Cumberland Mountains and Tennessee River and Chickamauga Campaign August 16-September 22. Battle of Chickamauga September 19–20. Siege of Chattanooga September 24 – October 27. Reopening Tennessee River October 26–29. Duty at White sides, Tyner's Station and Blue Springs, Tenn., until April 1864. Atlanta Campaign May 1-September 8. Tunnel Hill May 6–7. Demonstration on Rocky Faced Ridge and Dalton May 8–13. Near Dalton May 13. Battle of Resaca May 14–15. Near Kingston May 18–19. Near Cassville May 19. Kingston May 21. Operations on line of Pumpkin Vine Creek and battles about Dallas, New Hope Church and Allatoona Hills May 25-June 5. Operations about Marietta and against Kennesaw Mountain June 10-July 2. Pine Hill June 11–14. Lost Mountain June 15–17. Assault on Kennesaw June 27. Ruff's Station, Smyrna Camp Ground, July 4. Chattahoochie River July 6–17. Peach Tree Creek July 19–20. Siege of Atlanta July 22 – August 25. Utoy Creek August 5–7. Flank movement on Jonesboro August 25–30. Battle of Jonesboro August 31-September 1. Lovejoy's Station September 2–6. Operations in northern Georgia and northern Alabama against Hood September 29-October 26. Nashville Campaign November–December. Columbia, Duck River, November 24–28. Battle of Franklin November 30. Battle of Nashville December 15–16. Pursuit of Hood to the Tennessee River December 17–28. At Huntsville, Ala., until March 1865. Expedition to Bull's Gap and operations in eastern Tennessee March 13 – April 25. Moved to Nashville, Tenn., April 25, and duty there until June. Moved to New Orleans, La., June 17–25, thence to Indianola, Texas, July 13–21. Duty at Indianola and Victoria, Texas, until December.

== Casualties ==
The regiment lost a total of 319 men during service; 5 officers and 60 enlisted men killed or mortally wounded, 254 enlisted men died of disease.

== Commanders ==
- Colonel Frederick S. Stumbaugh
- Lieutenant Colonel Peter B. Housum - commanded at the battle of Stones River; died January 1, 1863, of a mortal wound received in this battle
- Colonel Thomas E. Rose – commanded at the battle Stones River as captain; mastermind of the Libby Prison Escape
- Captain Joseph J. Lawson – commanded at the battle of Chickamauga

== See also ==
- List of Pennsylvania Civil War Units
- Pennsylvania in the Civil War
