= Adolfo Fernández Cavada =

Cuban-American soldier and diplomat

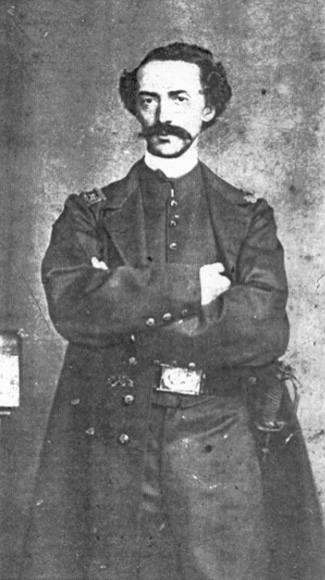
- Captain Adolfo Fernández Cavada
- Born: May 17, 1832; Cienfuegos, Cuba
- Died: December 18, 1871 (aged 39); Santiago de Cuba, Cuba
- Military career
- Allegiance: United States; Cuba
- Branch: (United States) Union Army (1861–1865) (Cuba) Cuban Liberation Army (1868-1871)
- Rank: Captain (U.S.); Commander-in-Chief of the Cinco Villas (Cuba)
- Unit: Philadelphia 23rd PA Infantry Regiment
- Conflicts: American Civil War: Battle of Fredericksburg; Battle of Gettysburg; Ten Years' War (Cuba)

Adolfo Fernández Cavada (Note: In this Spanish name, the first or paternal surname is Fernández and the second or maternal family name is Cavada.) (May 17, 1832 – December 18, 1871) was a soldier and diplomat, an officer in the Union Army during the American Civil War who served as captain in the Philadelphia 23rd Pennsylvania Infantry Regiment, a regiment of the Union Forces, with his brother, Colonel Federico Fernández Cavada. He served with distinction in the Army of the Potomac in the battles of Fredericksburg and Gettysburg and was a "special aide-de-camp" to General Andrew A. Humphreys. After the war, Fernández Cavada was appointed as consul in Cienfuegos, Cuba. He joined his brother, who had been in Trinidad, in the Cuban insurrection against Spanish rule and succeeded him as Commander-in-Chief of the Cinco Villas. He was killed in action.

== Early years ==
Fernández Cavada was one of three sons born in Cienfuegos, Cuba, to Isidoro Fernández Cavada and Emily Howard Gatier, an American citizen and native of Philadelphia. After his father's death in 1838, he moved with his mother and siblings to Philadelphia. Fernández Cavada's mother met and married Samuel Dutton and the family resided at 222 Spruce Street, Philadelphia. Fernández Cavada received his primary and secondary education at Philadelphia's Central High School.

== American Civil War ==
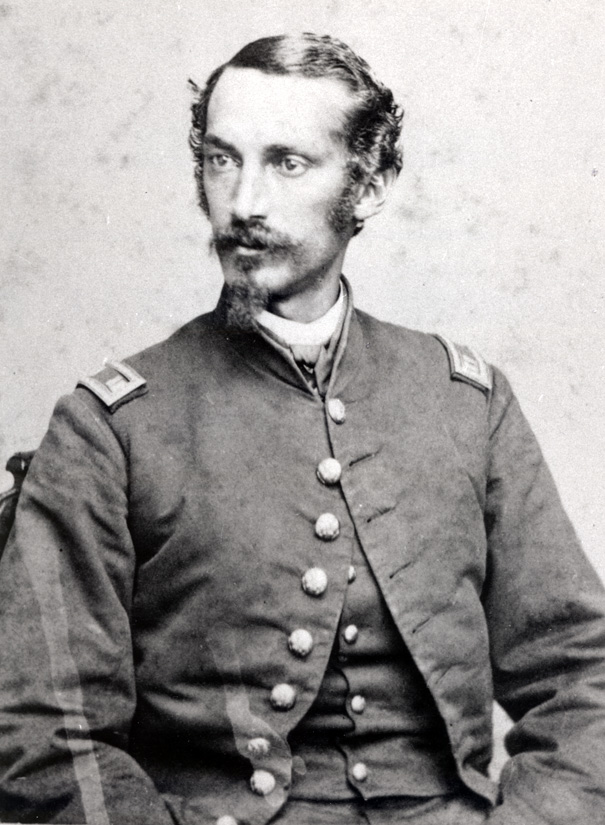
Adolfo's brother Col. Federico Fernández Cavada

Upon the outbreak of the American Civil War, both Adolfo and his brother Federico joined the Philadelphia 23rd Pennsylvania Infantry Regiment, a regiment of the Union Forces. The regiment was assigned to the Army of the Potomac. Federico was transferred to 114th Pennsylvania Infantry Regiment, while Adolfo remained with the regiment as an aide to General Andrew A. Humphreys. Adolfo participated in various battles including the Battle of Fredericksburg and the Battle of Gettysburg.

He was wounded during the Battle of Gettysburg when his horse was shot and killed from under him. Fernández Cavada kept a diary during the war which is considered to be one of the most vivid and articulate accounts of the Battle of Gettysburg. His eyewitness account of the famous conflict provided an expressively descriptive account of the battle. During one day of the July battle, he recorded how "The air was soon full of flying shot, shell and canister—and a groan here and there attested their affect. ...the roar of musketry and the crashing, pounding noise of guns and bursting shells was deafening..."

== Ten Years' War ==
After the war, Fernández Cavada was appointed as United States consul at Cienfuegos, Cuba. Fernández Cavada resigned his position upon the Cuban insurrection against Spanish rule, which became known as the Ten Years' War (1868–1878). Together with his brother Federico, who had also resigned from his appointment as consul to Trinidad, he joined the insurgents in their quest for Cuba's independence.

In February 1869, Fernández Cavada attacked the town of Palmira. He led his men in the battles of Altos de Potrerillo and Saltadero de Siguanea and in the attack against the Arimao armory. On November 5, 1869, the men under Fernández Cavada's command took the town of Cienfuegos and a month later Arroyo Blanco. On April 4, 1870, Fernández Cavada was named Commander-in-Chief of the Cinco Villas with the rank of Mayor General, succeeding his brother Federico, who was named Commander-in-Chief of all the Cuban forces.

== Death ==
Adolfo's brother Federico was captured by the Spanish authorities and sentenced to die by firing squad in July 1871. On December 18, 1871, Adolfo Fernández Cavada was killed in battle at the La Adelaida coffee estate near Santiago de Cuba.

== Awards and decorations ==
Fernández Cavada's awards and decorations include the following:

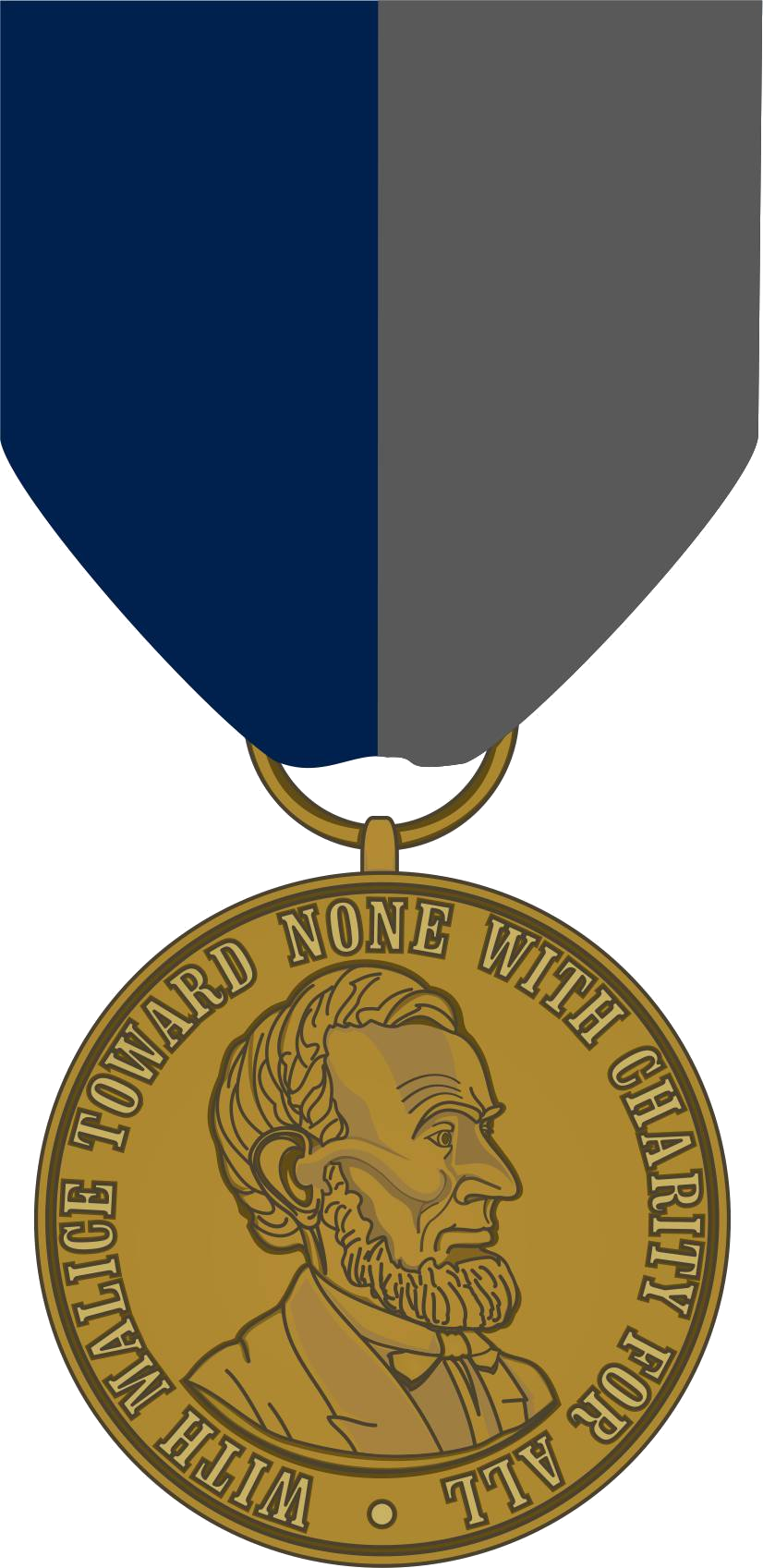
Army Civil War Campaign Medal

== See also ==
- Hispanics in the American Civil War
- Federico Fernández Cavada
