= Thomas E. Rose =

American general (1830–1907)

Thomas Ellwood Rose
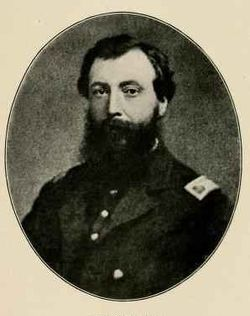
- Born: March 12, 1830; Solebury, Pennsylvania, U.S.
- Died: November 6, 1907 (aged 77); Washington, D.C., U.S.
- Burial place: Arlington National Cemetery, Arlington, Virginia, U.S.
- Spouse: Lydia C. Trumbower
- Military career
- Allegiance: United States (Union)
- Branch: United States Army (Union Army)
- Service years: 1861 – 1865; 1866 – 1894
- Rank: Major, USA; Bvt. Lieutenant Colonel, USA; Colonel, USV; Bvt. Brigadier General, USV
- Units: 11th Infantry Regiment; 16th Infantry Regiment; 18th Infantry Regiment
- Commands: 77th Pennsylvania Infantry Regiment
- Known for: Being the mastermind behind the Libby Prison escape
- Conflicts: American Civil War; Battle of Stones River; Tullahoma campaign; Battle of Liberty Gap; Chickamauga campaign; Battle of Chickamauga; Atlanta campaign; Battle of Ackworth; Battle of Kennesaw Mountain (WIA); Franklin–Nashville campaign; Battle of Franklin

Thomas Ellwood Rose (1830-1907) was an American Brevet Brigadier General during the American Civil War. He commanded the 77th Pennsylvania Infantry Regiment who participated through the Chickamauga campaign and the Atlanta campaign. After being captured at the Battle of Chickamauga, he was detained at Libby Prison but Rose managed to be the ultimate mastermind behind the Libby Prison escape using simple and meager tools to dig a tunnel through the prison.

== Early years ==
Rose was born at Bucks County, Pennsylvania on March 12, 1830, and spent his early years educating himself across several schools and academies with the help of his father. As a child, Rose took interest in military history and geography as he could recount many famous battles, the geography descriptions of the battlefields as well as the uniforms the soldiers wore.

== American Civil War ==
When the American Civil War broke out, Rose enlisted into the 12th Pennsylvania Infantry Regiment as a private at Company I on April 25, 1861. Rose was then offered a commission to command Company I as its captain and he agreed, becoming so on October 28, 1861. Rose first saw active combat at the Battle of Stones River where the previous commander, Peter B. Housum, was killed and Rose lead the 77th Pennsylvania throughout the rest of the battle. When Union command began to collapse during the battle, Rose and the 77th Pennsylvania held their positions and managed to hold the Confederates off. For his service in the battle, Rose was promoted to Colonel on February 1, 1863. Rose then participated in the Battle of Liberty Gap, the brigade commander was killed during the battle and Rose commanded the entire brigade and while the action was seen as stubborn, the Union troops eventually won the battle and Rose was praised for his service during the battle. During the Battle of Chickamauga, while commanding his regiment, with the 79th Illinois Infantry Regiment, the 77th Pennsylvania and the 79th Illinois were guarding an important position but isolated from the main line which resulted in a massive Confederate force attacking in overwhelming numbers. Despite the resistance of both regiments, Rose and other officers were captured and promptly sent to Libby Prison.

== Libby Prison ==
Rose was determined to not spend his final days of the war there and began devising ways to escape due to the extremely poor living conditions there such as no beds, sparse rations and the temperature constantly being cold there. The worst realization came when Rose and other Pennsylvanian officers learnt of the even worse conditions at Belle Isle. Rose formed a group of 15 men to begin digging a tunnel to the sewer line at the prison at an unused storage basement room that was infested with rats. Their tools consisted of meager supplies such as a table knifer, an auger, a chisel, a couple of spoons or even their bare hands as two men would take turns digging the tunnel each day. After Rose and the other men broke through the wooden pillings, they made it to the sewer but the smell caused one man to faint and most of the men didn't want to continue into the drainage system and had to fill the tunnel back up with dirt in order to not flood the basement. Rose then proposed another tunnel to head for a street and use the carriage house on where to dig the new tunnel at. Reportedly, Rose was so obsessed with freedom that he was digging 24/7 one day and would only take small breaks for air before going back down and covering the tunnel with a wooden plank.

On February 8, 1864, all the 109 men who participated in the escape were notified of the date of the escape and advising them to ration all of their food before Rose led all of them down the tunnel and despite the street being well lit with gas lamps and sentries in many places, all of the men managed to escape and hide within the darkness. The next day, the Confederates found out about the escapees and John H. Winder suspected that the guards that night were all bribed and called for their arrests as well as the searching of all of their money. Despite this however, none of the guards had any stacks of cash and they were all released. Of the 109 men that escaped, only 48 would make it within the Union ranks as the rest were either killed or captured. Rose himself nearly reached the Union lines, but he was recaptured and sent back to Libby Prison. However, he was eventually released due to an officer exchange and returned to his regiment.

== Later years ==
Rose then participated in the Atlanta campaign with his first returning battle and resumed command being at the Battle of Ackworth. During the Battle of Kennesaw Mountain, Rose was wounded before being placed under the IV Corps. Rose then participated at the Battle of Franklin but his horse was killed during the battle. On July 22, 1865, Rose was brevetted Brigadier General for "gallant and meritorious services". Despite being mustered out with the 77th Pennsylvania on December 5, 1865, Rose re-enlisted in the United States Army on July 28, 1866, as a captain of the 11th Infantry Regiment. Rose was brevetted Major and Lieutenant Colonel on March 2, 1867, and was promoted to Major on April 2, 1892, before retiring on April 23, 1894. He spent his final years at Washington, D.C. before dying on November 6, 1907, and being buried at Arlington National Cemetery along with his wife, Lydia C. Trumbower.

== See also ==
- List of American Civil War brevet generals (Union)
