= Libby Prison =

Military prison in Richmond, Virginia, during the US Civil War

Coordinates: 37°31′51.14″N 77°25′34.11″W

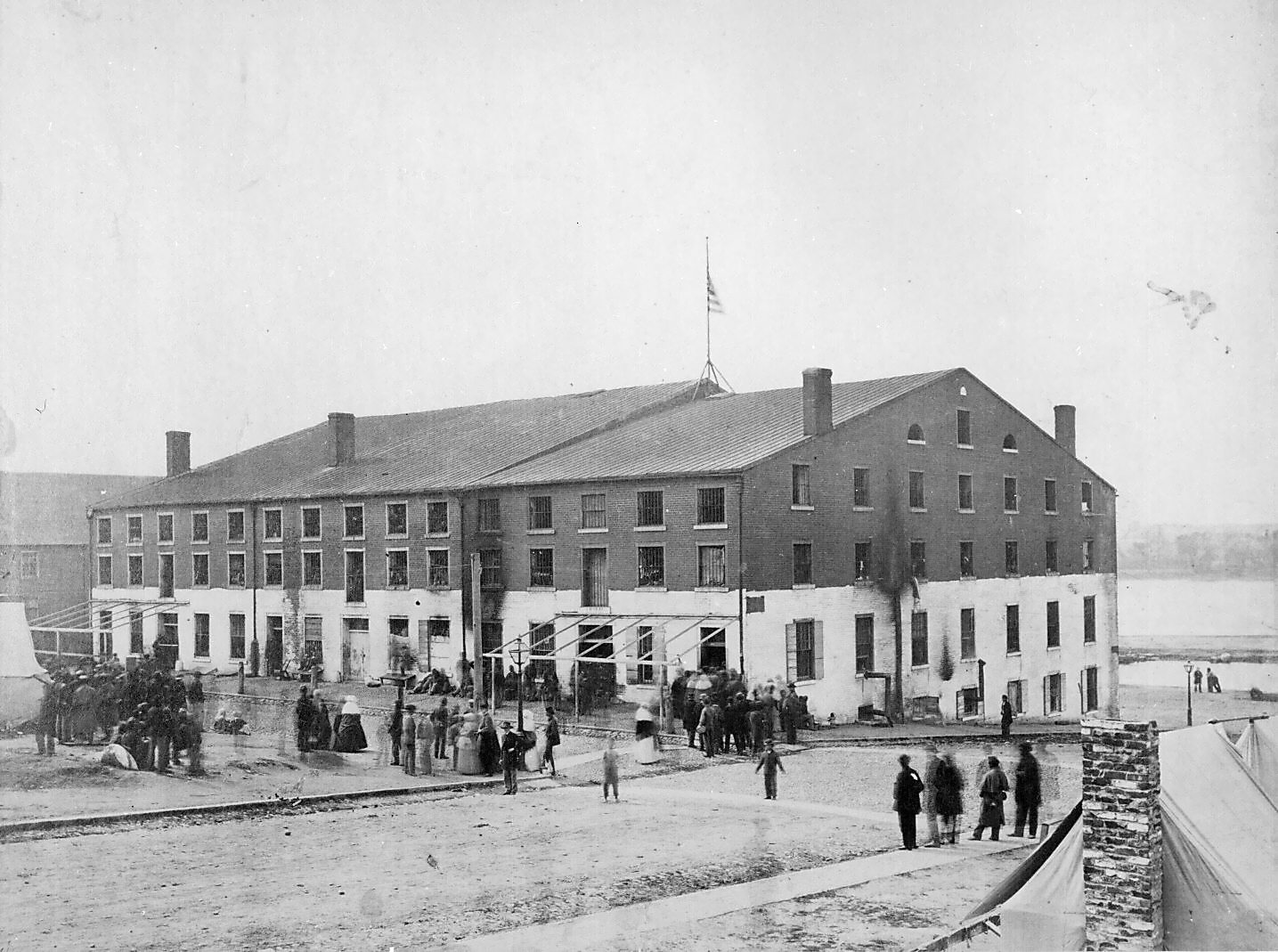
1865 photograph of Libby Prison

Libby Prison was a Confederate prison at Richmond, Virginia, during the American Civil War. In 1862 it was designated to hold officer prisoners from the Union Army, taking in numbers from the nearby Seven Days Battles (in which nearly 16,000 Union men and officers had been killed, wounded, or captured between June 25 and July 1 alone) and other conflicts of the Union's Peninsular campaign to take Richmond and end the war only a year after it had begun. As the conflict wore on the prison gained an infamous reputation for the overcrowded and harsh conditions. Prisoners suffered high mortality from disease and malnutrition. By 1863, one thousand prisoners were crowded into large open rooms on two floors, with open, barred windows leaving them exposed to weather and temperature extremes.

The building was built before the war as a tobacco warehouse and then used for food and groceries before being converted to a prison. In 1889, Charles F. Gunther moved the structure to Chicago and renovated it as a war museum. In 1899 the building was torn down and sold for scrap.

== History ==
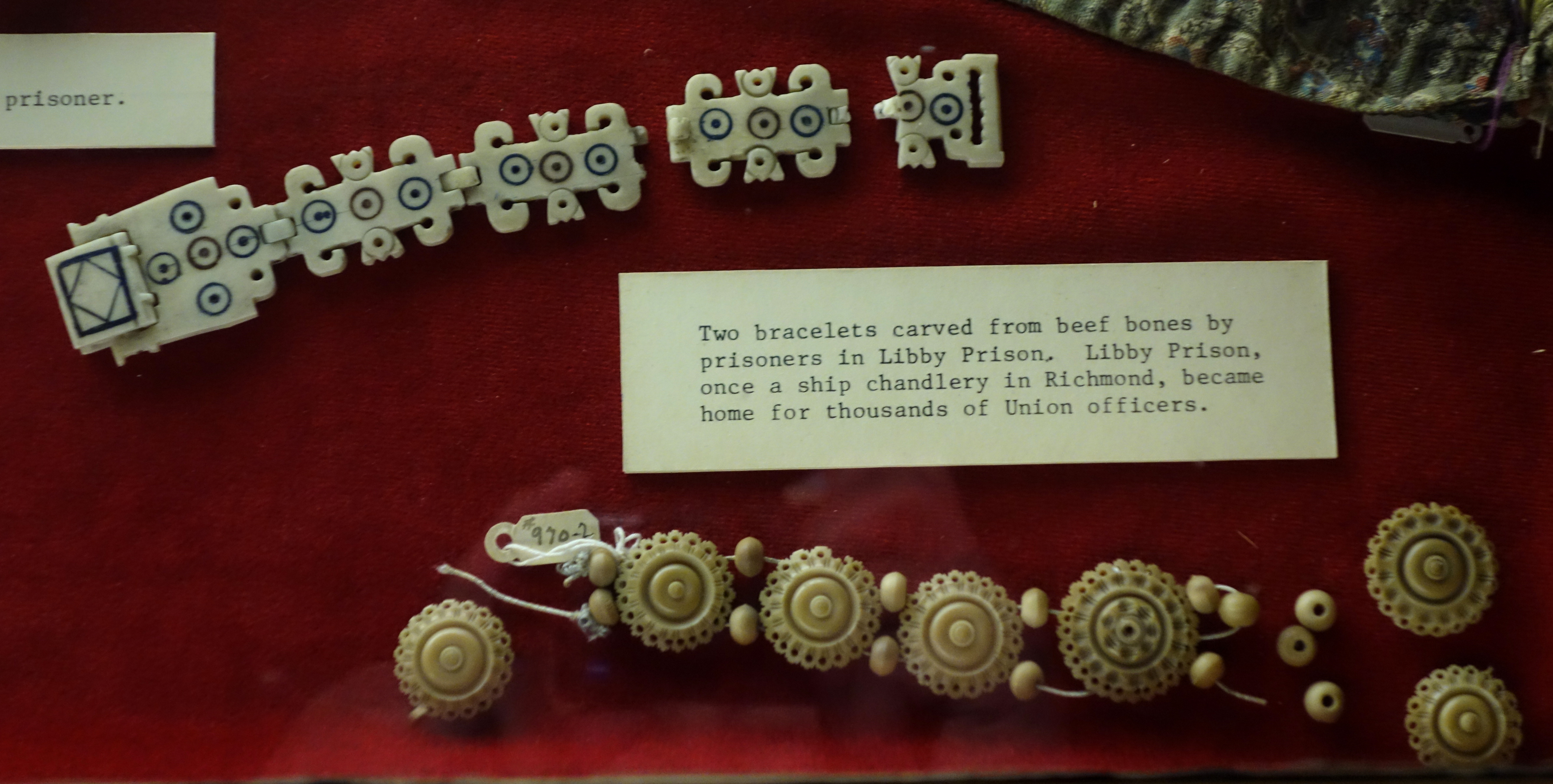
Bracelets carved from beef bones in Libby Prison

The prison was located in a three-story brick tobacco warehouse on two levels on Tobacco Row at the waterfront of the James River. In 1861 was leased by Capt. Luther Libby and his son George W. Libby. They operated a ship's chandlery and grocery business.

The Confederate government started to use the facility as a hospital and prison in late 1861. In 1862 they reserved it to hold Union officers because of the influx of prisoners. It contained eight low-ceilinged rooms, each 103 by 42 feet (31.4 by 12.5 metres). The second and third floors were used to house prisoners. Windows were barred and open to the elements, increasing the discomfort of occupants. Lack of sanitation and overcrowding caused diseases. From holding 700 prisoners in 1862, by 1863 the facility far exceeded the maximum capacity of 1,000. Mortality rates were high in 1863 and 1864, aggravated by Confederate shortages of food and supplies. Because of the high death toll, Libby Prison is generally regarded as second only in notoriety to Andersonville Prison in Georgia.

In 1863, The New York Times published a description of "the Libby" from a purported prisoner diary entry. The next year, Kentucky Volunteer Infantry Captain I.N. Johnston, who escaped from Libby Prison, attempted to corroborate the article. (He testified that "...an African slave...did all in his power to restore us to freedom and home."

He wrote

"...the building is of brick, with a front of near one hundred and forty feet, and one hundred feet deep. It is divided into nine rooms; the ceilings are low, and ventilation imperfect; the windows are barred, through which the windings of James River and the tents of Belle Isle may be seen. Its immediate surroundings are far from being agreeable; the sentinels pacing the streets constantly are unpleasant reminders that your stay is not a matter of choice; and were it so, few would choose it long as a boarding-house."

In March 1864, Union worries about the safety of Richmond and related security of the prisons, and the scarcity of resources peaked. The next month, Union officer Harland Richardson pleaded "once more" for a "Mr. Reilly," presumably on behalf of the U.S. War Department, to send provisions to Libby. Such requests were either delayed by Libby commandants or ignored, as the U.S. War Department funneled supplies into active Union lines.

Confederates permitted a one-time Union shipment as their own provisions dwindled. During the late spring and summer, they evacuated most prisoners-of-war from Richmond to Macon, Georgia. Enlisted men were transferred to Andersonville while the officers housed at Libby would transfer to a new prison in Macon. From April to August 1864, Libby continued to be used, mostly as a place for temporary confinement of Union officers and a small number of Confederate military criminals. On September 18, The New York Times reported that approximately 230 Union officers remained in Libby Prison.

Due to the Siege of Petersburg and the transfer of more prisoners-of-war, the number of inmates (officers and non-officers alike) surged. In autumn 1864, as the New York Times published President Lincoln's endorsement of the U.S. Sanitary Commission's "inquiry" into Confederate prison conditions and Union officer "martyrdom," Richmond dailies continued to report a resurgence of incarcerated numbers at Libby Prison. On October 10, 1864, the Richmond Sentinel reported on the arrival of "one thousand five hundred and fifty two Yankee prisoners" at Libby, 1114 of which "were sent to Salisbury, North Carolina, yesterday, in order to make room for other prisoners expected to arrive here" (438 of these prisoners remained in Libby).

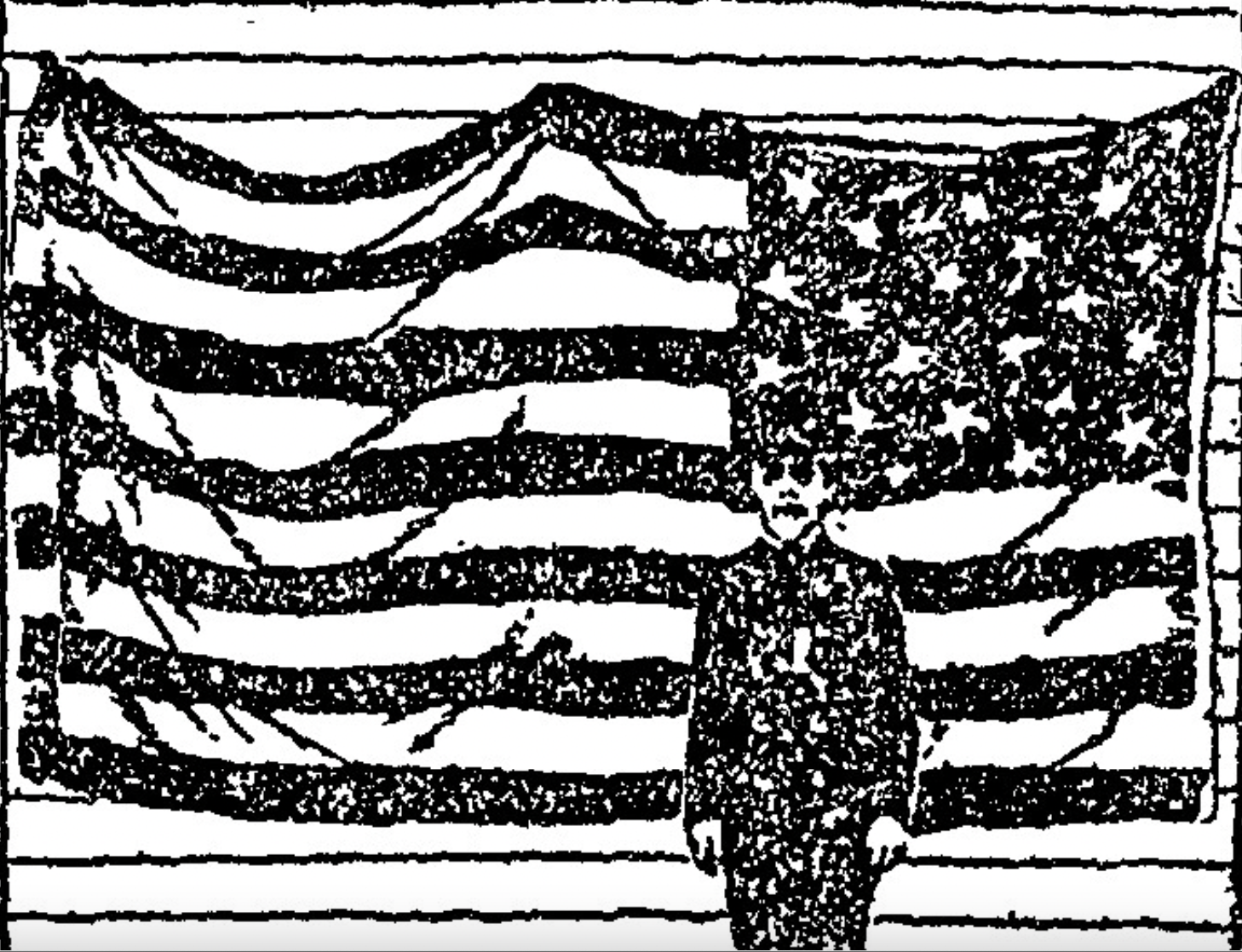
American flag made by the prisoner in secret

On October 14, according to Confederate prison records, officers corresponded on the fate of 82 out of 148 "Colored Troops" recently arrived at Libby Prison, bringing the total number of Union inmates to almost one thousand. Lieutenant-General Ewell ordered "all negroes on hand not employed about the prison" turned over to "Brigadier-General Barton for work on the fortifications." The commandant believed that the troops "seemed pleased at being released from prison to be put to work," joining an additional "sixty-eight negro soldiers [who] were sent to the works on the 2d instant. These negroes were captured at Petersburg July 30, 1864. Eleven of them are free; the rest are slaves." The remainder of the "U.S. Colored Troops," 66 in total, either had perished or could not physically depart from Libby Prison due to ailments and wounds. Any wages for black prisoners "employed about the prison" and additional wages for fortification construction, aside from "a day's rations," remain subjects of scholarly inquiry.

Union officer petitions for assistance, written in advance of prisoner exchanges or before the officers died, indicated mass suffering and deteriorating conditions within the already deplorable Libby. Newspapers on both sides of the war denounced atrocities ostensibly committed against prisoners by oppositional governments and prison commandants. Impulses and goals for these Richmond dailies' Union prisoner-of-war tallies remain subjects of scholarly inquiry. On March 30, 1865, The New York Times published a summation of Union captive numbers in Libby Prison, as well as the conditions of confinement, less than two weeks before the Battle of Appomattox Court House. The New York newspaper based its findings on the foregoing Richmond dailies and additional testimony.

After the occupation of Richmond in 1865, Union authorities used Libby Prison for detention of former Confederate officers. They reportedly improved conditions over those that had been common for Union officers, or prisoners of war on both sides generally during the war.

In April 1865, U.S. President Abraham Lincoln visited Richmond, Virginia and toured the city on foot. When he came across Libby Prison, a crowd of onlookers stated "We will tear it down", to which Lincoln replied, "No, leave it as a monument."

In 1880, the building was purchased by Southern Fertilizer Company. In 1889, it was bought by Charles F. Gunther, a candymaker. He had the building disassembled, and moved to downtown Chicago. There it was rebuilt to serve as a war museum. In 1899, after the museum failed to draw enough crowds, the building was dismantled and was sold in pieces as scrap.

== Prisoner conditions ==
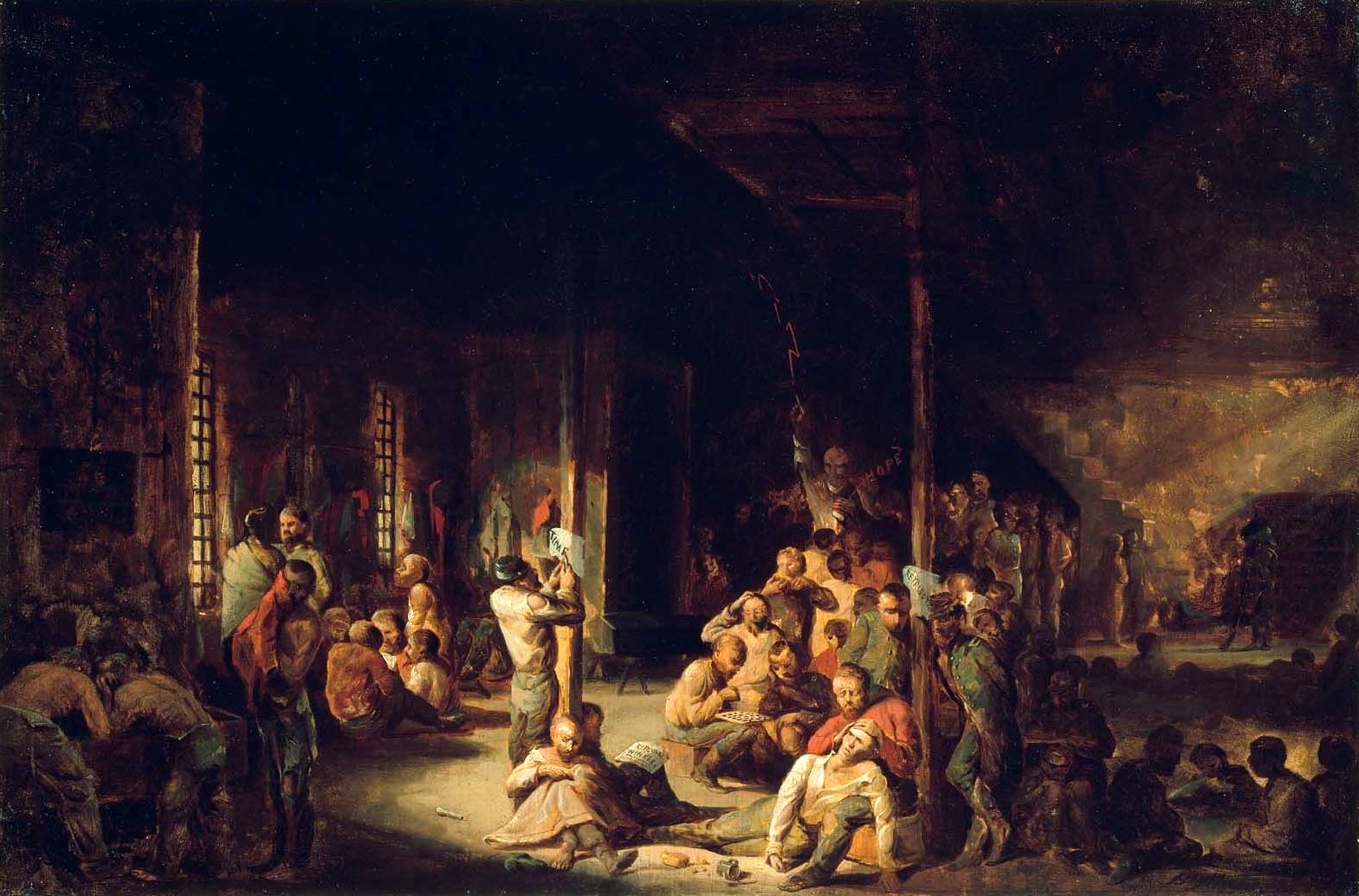
Depiction by David Gilmour Blythe, 1863

Upon their release from Libby a group of Union surgeons published an account in 1863 of their experiences treating Libby inmates in the attached hospital:

Thus we have over ten per cent of the whole number of prisoners held classed as sick men, who need the most assiduous and skilful attention; yet, in the essential matter of rations, they are receiving nothing but corn bread and sweet potatoes. Meat is no longer furnished to any class of our prisoners except to the few officers in Libby hospital, and all sick or well officers or privates are now furnished with a very poor article of corn bread in place of wheat bread, unsuitable diet for hospital patients prostrated with diarrhea, dysentery and fever, to say nothing of the balance of startling instances of individual suffering and horrid pictures of death from protracted sickness and semi-starvation we have had thrust upon our observation.

They said that prisoners were always asking for more food and that many were only half clad. Newly arriving prisoners who were already ill often died quickly, even in one night. Due to the "systematic abuse, neglect and semi-starvation," the surgeons believed that thousands of men would be left "permanently broken down in their [bodily] constitutions" if they survived. In one story they noted that 200 wounded prisoners brought in from the Battle of Chickamauga had been given only a few hard crackers during their three days' journey, but suffered two more days in the prison without medical attention or food.

An article in the Daily Richmond Enquirer vividly described prison conditions in 1864:

Libby takes in the captured Federals by scores, but lets none out; they are huddled up and jammed into every nook and corner; at the bathing troughs, around the cooking stoves, everywhere there is a wrangling, jostling crowd; at night the floor of every room they occupy in the building is covered, every square inch of it, by uneasy slumberers, lying side by side, and heel to head, as tightly packed as if the prison were a huge, improbable box of nocturnal sardines.

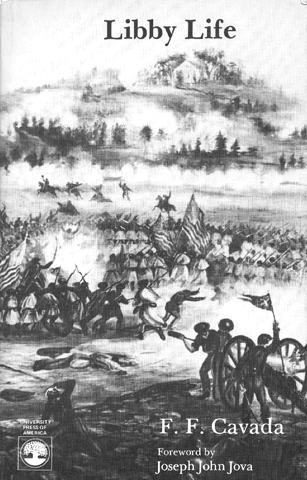
"LIBBY LIFE" by Lieut. Col. Federico Fernández Cavada

Lieut. Colonel Federico Fernández Cavada, who belonged to the Hot Air Balloon Unit of the Union Army, was captured during the Battle of Gettysburg and sent to Libby. Released in 1864, Fernandez Cavada later that year published a book titled LIBBY LIFE: Experiences of A Prisoner of War in Richmond, VA, 1863-64, in which he told of the cruel treatment in the Confederate prison.

In the introduction, Cavada wrote:

It was a beautiful country through which we had just passed, but it had presented no charms to weary eyes that were compelled to view it through a line of hostile bayonets; we felt but little sympathy for the beautiful; on our haggard countenances only this was written: "Give us rest, and food."

Cavada published his narrative before 1865. Former Union prisoners also published memoirs after the surrender at Appomattox in April 1865. According to a Southern source printed after the war:

Such [post-1865] memoirs should be read in context, however. After the war, former Union prisoners were not granted pensions unless they had also sustained injuries or suffered from disease during their service. To muster support for their plight, the veterans mounted a public-relations campaign that included wildly sensationalistic "recollections" owing much to the dime novels of the "Wild West." When the United States government granted universal pensions beginning in 1890, these memoirs virtually disappeared.

== The Libby Chronicle ==
(The Libby Chronicle, edited by Louis Beaudry, Albany, NY)

The Libby Chronicle was a newsletter written by the inmates of Libby during the summer of 1863; it was read aloud by the editor every Friday morning. Composed in the midst of hardship and brutality, the newsletter expressed irreverent humor.

Issue number two included a poem entitled "Castle Thunder," with a "dryly witty perspective" on prison life:

We have eighteen kinds of food, though 'twill stagger your belief,
Because we have bread, beef and soup, then bread, soup and beef;
Then we sep'rate around with'bout twenty in a group,
And thus we get beef, soup and bread, and beef, bread and soup;
For dessert we obtain, though it costs us nary red,
Soup, bread and beef, (count it well) and beef and soup and bread.

Such poems helped keep up morale among the prisoners. The following week's issue begins with a segment called "Encore," which reads, "Yielding to pressing demand from those who heard and from many who did not hear the poem entitled 'Castle Thunder,' we reproduce it this week. We are certain that the uproarious laughter caused by this facetious article . . . has done more good in Libby than cartloads of Confederate medicine."

Commonly expressed was hostility toward President Abraham Lincoln, whom they considered responsible for their being held so long in prison. The editors of The Chronicle rebuked such sentiments, saying, "these officers evince more the spirit of spoiled children than that of manly courage and intelligence which should characterize the actions of the American soldier."

Men made independent efforts to secure their release. For instance, one young surgeon wrote a letter to the editor of the Richmond Sentinel, promising that if he were released he would find the editor's "Rebel son" and look after him until he could be returned home. Chronicle editors reported that "this same officer was poltroon enough to offer to leave the Federal army if the Confederates would do something for him. But the Rebels didn't want the poor Judas, and he finds he has eaten dirt without advantage."

== Escape from Libby ==
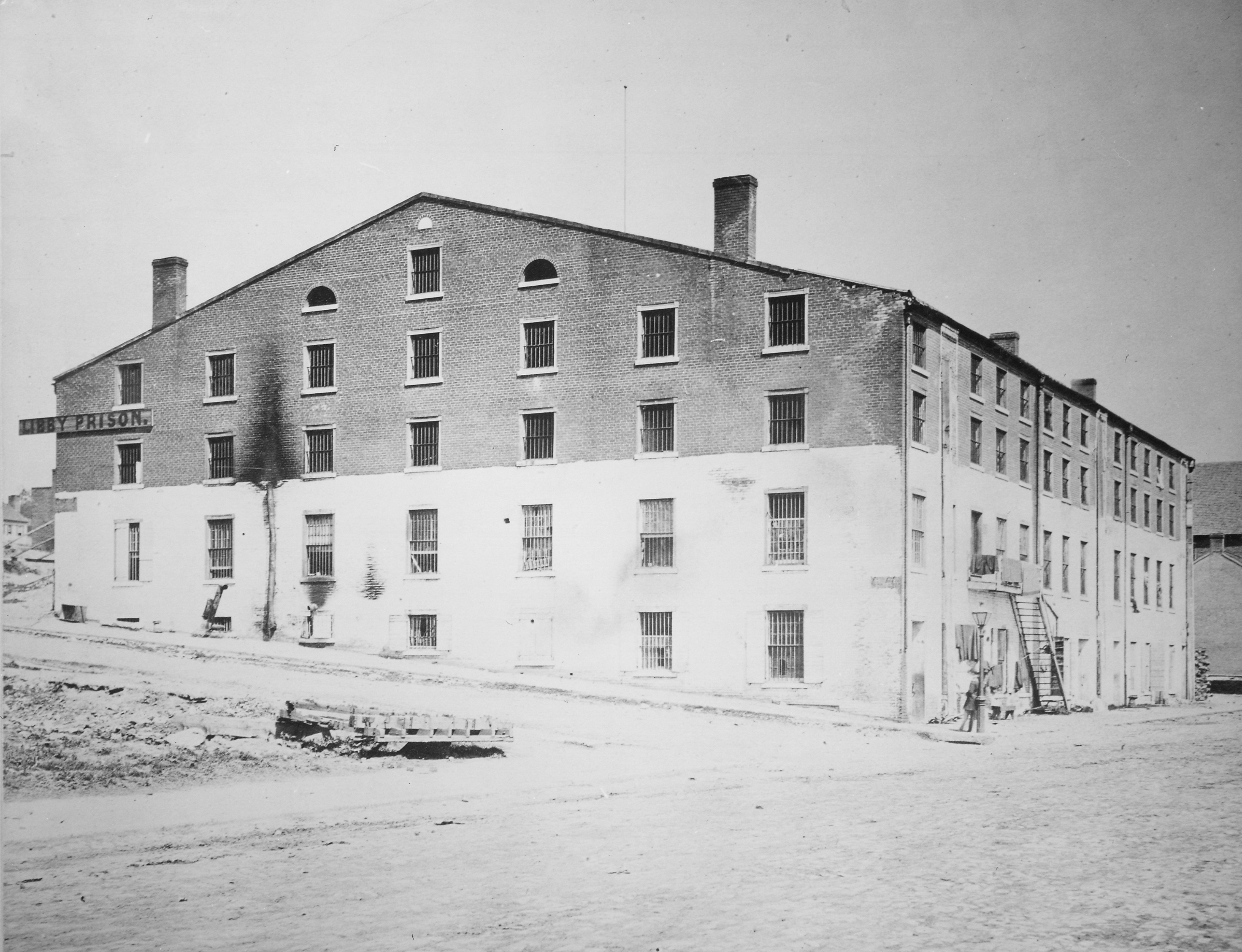
Libby Prison, 1865, from the collection of the National Archives and Records Administration.

During the second week of February 1864, 109 Union officers took part in what was later dubbed by the press as the Libby Prison escape. Captain Morton Tower of Company B, 13th Mass. Infantry, wrote in his published memoirs about his successful escape: "On the night of February 9th, as soon as it was sufficiently dark, the exodus from the prison commenced. Major Hamilton, Col. Thomas E. Rose, and some of the projectors were the first to pass through. Col. Davis of the 4th Maine and myself had passed through the tunnel to the yard just as the clocks of Richmond were striking twelve. Near daybreak we reached a thicket of woods where we stopped to rest." Capt. Tower and Col. Davis eluded recapture and soon joined 57 other escapees who also made it to the Union lines.("Army Experience of Morton Tower- his escape from Libby Prison", "Memoirs of Capt. Morton Tower", June 1870)

The Charleston Mercury carried the story:

At the base of the east wall, and about twenty feet from the Cary street front, was discovered a tunnel, the entrance to which was hidden by a large rock, which fitted the aperture exactly. This stone, rolled away from the mouth of the sepulcher, revealed an avenue, which it was at once conjectured led to the outer world beyond. A small negro boy was sent into the tunnel on a tour of exploration, and by the time Major Turner and Lieutenant LaTouche gained the outside of the building, a shout from the negro announced his arrival at the terminus of the subterranean route. Its passage lay directly beneath the tread of three sentinels, who walked the breadth of the east end of the prison, across a paved alley way, a distance of more than fifty feet, breaking up inside of the enclosure in the rear of Carr warehouse. So nicely was the distance gauged, that the inside of the enclosure was struck precisely, which hints strongly of outside measurement and assistance. Through connection once opened, the prisoners were enabled to worm themselves through the tunnel, one by one, and emerging at least sixty feet distant from any sentinel post, to retake themselves off, singly, through an arched gateway, to some appointed rendezvous. To reach the entrance of the tunnel it was necessary for the prisoners to cut through the hospital room and the closed stairway leading into the basement. All the labor must have been performed at night, and all traces of the work accomplished at night was closed up or cleared away before the morning light. The tunnel itself is a work of several months, being about three feet in diameter and at least sixty feet in length, with curvatures worked around rock.

("Particulars of the Escape of the Yankee Officers from the Libby Prison", The Charleston Mercury, February 16, 1864)

Three tunnels were built: the first ran into water and was abandoned. The second hit the building's log foundation. The third reached a small carriage shed 15 m (50 ft) away. Escapes were regular occurrences at both Federal and Confederate prisons.

== Letters from Libby ==
The Christian Recorder and other papers, from both Republican and divided states, sometimes included letters from prisoners prior to the fall of Richmond in early April 1865. The rules of Libby Prison limited men to six lines for their letters to family and friends. Here is an example:

"My Dear Wife. - Yours received - no hopes of exchange - send corn starch - want socks - no money - rheumatism in left shoulder - pickles very good - send sausages - God bless you - kiss the baby - Hail Columbia! - Your devoted husband."

== After the war ==
As of March 1888, an effort was underway by a Chicago syndicate to relocate Libby Prison to Chicago, said one period newspaper, "where it will be kept as a curiosity." In 1907, nails from Libby prison were melted down and used to cast the Pokahuntas Bell for the Jamestown Exposition. The front door of Libby Prison is displayed in the American Civil War Museum, located at the former Tredegar Iron Works in Richmond.

In the context of what historian Benjamin Wetzel referred to as "a growing body of scholarship that questions the reconciliationist narrative", scholars have explored how Union widows, sisters, and cousins, in both correspondence and verse, lamented the deaths and "changes" in survivor psychology and physiology that resulted from Libby Prison confinement. In addition, Theodore Roosevelt supported and convened the Republican and then Progressive (Bull Moose) Parties' national conventions at the Chicago Coliseum, the former Libby Prison museum site that continued to feature the prison façade.

== In popular culture ==
- A melodramatic Broadway play about the escape entitled A Fair Rebel, by Harry P. Mawson, premiered in New York City at the Star Theatre in December 1889. It later was staged on Broadway in 1891 at the Fourteenth Street Theatre. In 1914, a 3-reel silent film version was released starring Linda Arvidson, Charles Perley, and Dorothy Gish, and directed by Frank Powell.
- The western film Virginia City (1940), stars Errol Flynn, Alan Hale Sr., and Guinn "Big Boy" Williams as officers who escape from Libby Prison after causing an explosion.
- In Mysterious Island (1961), Union soldiers Cyrus Harding (Michael Craig), Herbert Brown (Michael Callan), and Neb (Dan Jackson), along with Union war correspondent Gideon Spillet (Gary Merrill) and Confederate sergeant Pencroft (Percy Herbert) escape from Libby Prison via an observation balloon.
- Episode 25 titled "Escape" of the anthology TV series The Great Adventure (1964) shows a dramatization of the planning and escaping from Libby Prison.
- In the television miniseries North and South (1986), General George Hazard (James Read) is taken prisoner and sent to Libby Prison, then under temporary command of Captain Turner (Wayne Newton). He is rescued by his best friend, General Orry Main (Patrick Swayze), and Main's cousin, Confederate officer Charles Main (Lewis Smith).
- The escape is in the television series History's Greatest Escapes with Morgan Freeman season 2 episode 7 (2024).

== See also ==
- List of Civil War POW prisons and camps
