= Cavadas =

Cavadas may refer to

== Localities in Portugal ==
- A locality in the parish of Arrentela, Seixal municipality
- A locality in the parish of Louriçal, Pombal municipality

== Surname ==
- Cavadas (surname)
