= Federico Fernández Cavada =

Union army officer (1831–1871)

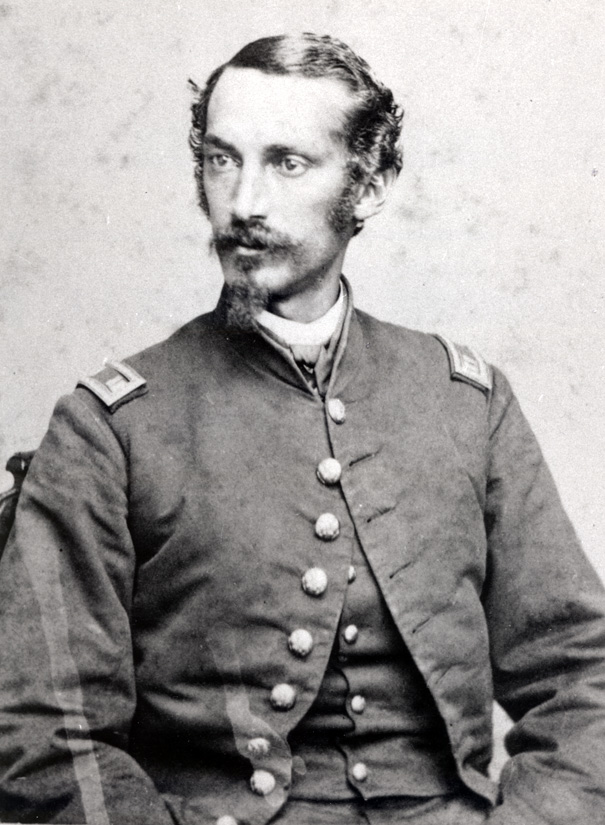
- Lt. Colonel Federico Fernández Cavada
- Born: July 8th, 1831; Cienfuegos, Cuba, Spanish Empire
- Died: July 1st, 1871 (aged 39); Puerto Príncipe, Cuba, Spanish Empire
- Military career
- Allegiance: United States; Cuba
- Branch: Union army (1861–1865); Cuban Liberation Army (1868-1871)
- Rank: Lieutenant Colonel (U.S.); Army General (Cuba)
- Nickname: General Candela (General Fire)
- Commands: 114th Pennsylvania Infantry Regiment
- Conflicts: American Civil War; Second Battle of Bull Run; Peninsula campaign; Battle of Fredericksburg; Battle of Gettysburg; Ten Years' War (executed)
- Other work: engineer, author

Federico Fernández Cavada (July 8, 1831 – July 1, 1871) was an officer in the Union army during the American Civil War and a diplomat, as well as commander-in-chief of all the Cuban forces during Cuba's Ten Years' War. Because of his artistic talents, he was assigned to the Hot Air Balloon Unit of the Union army. From the air he sketched what he observed of enemy positions and movements. On April 19, 1862, Fernández Cavada sketched enemy positions from Thaddeus Lowe's Constitution balloon during the Peninsular campaign in Virginia.

At the rank of lieutenant colonel, he was captured during the Battle of Gettysburg and sent to Libby Prison for Union officers in Richmond, Virginia. Released in 1864, that year he published a book that told of the cruel treatment that he had received in the Confederate prison. His brother Adolfo Fernández Cavada also served as an officer in the Union army.

After the war, Fernández Cavada was appointed by the United States government as consul to Cuba. When the insurrection began against Spanish rule, he resigned his commission and joined the insurgents. His brother was also serving there and resigned his commission, joining the war. Federico was commissioned as a general. Cuban authorities eventually commissioned him as the commander-in-chief of all the Cuban forces during what became the island's Ten Years' War for independence.

== Early life and education ==
Fernández Cavada was one of three sons born in Cienfuegos, Cuba, to Emily Howard Gatier and Isidoro Fernández Cavada. His mother was an American citizen and a native of Philadelphia. After his father's death in 1838, Emily Gatier returned to Philadelphia with her sons.

There, the young widow met and married Samuel Dutton. Together, the family resided at 222 Spruce Street. Fernández Cavada received his primary and secondary education at Philadelphia's Central High School. After being certified in a training program, he later worked as a civil engineer and as a topographer in the Panama Canal.

== American Civil War ==
Upon the outbreak of the American Civil War, both Federico and his brother Adolfo Fernández Cavada joined the 23rd Pennsylvania Infantry, a regiment of the Union army. Federico was transferred to the 114th Pennsylvania Infantry Regiment. The regiment was assigned to the Army of the Potomac, which participated in such battles as the Second Battle of Bull Run, the Battle of Fredericksburg and the Battle of Gettysburg.

=== Sketches ===
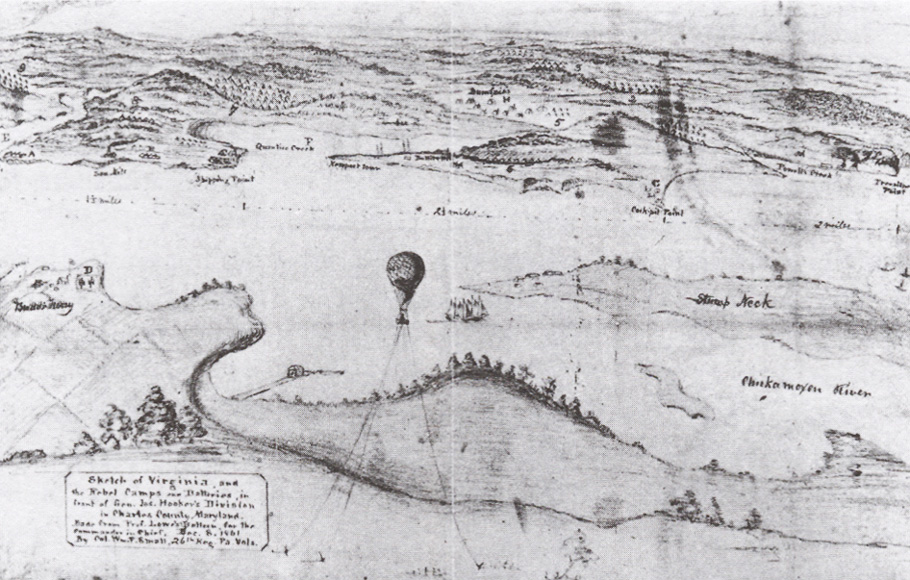
Sketch made by Col. Federico Fernandez Cavada from Thaddeus Lowe's Constitution balloon.

Fernández Cavada's artistic talents became evident because of his writings, sketches and paintings. Because of his artistic talents, he was assigned to the Hot Air Balloon unit of the Union army. From the air he sketched what he observed of the enemy movements. On April 19, 1862, Fernández Cavada sketched enemy positions from Thaddeus Lowe's Constitution balloon during the Peninsula campaign in Virginia. That year Fernández Cavada wrote a poem in which he said:

"I have pulled through many a march, I have been in many a battle, I have seen the bomb-shell burst, I have heard the grapeshot rattle! With the bravest, in the strife, I have nobly risked my life."

=== Battle of Gettysburg ===
On August 29, 1862, he was promoted to the rank of lieutenant colonel. During the Battle of Gettysburg, a number of the regiment fell into the enemy's hands, including Fernández Cavada; he was succeeded by Major Edward R. Bowen.

On July 2, 1863, the 114th Pennsylvania regiment was engaged in battle against General William Barksdale's Mississippi troops, known as Barksdale's Brigade, at Peach Orchard near the wheat field where the bloodiest part of the Battle of Gettysburg, occurred on the second day of the encounter. Although Barksdale's troops were defeated, Colonel Fernández Cavada was captured and sent to Libby Prison in Richmond, Virginia. He was released from prison in 1864, as part of a prisoner of war exchange between the Union and Confederate Forces. Returning to his unit, Fernández Cavada returned to his unit and continued to serve until April 1865.

== "LIBBY LIFE" ==
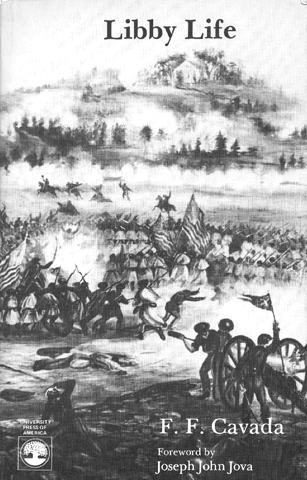
"LIBBY LIFE" by Col. Federico Fernández Cavada

Fernández Cavada published a book titled LIBBY LIFE: Experiences of A Prisoner of War in Richmond, Virginia, 1863-64 (1865), recounting the cruel treatment which he and other prisoners received in the Confederate prison. The work included his drawings of the prison and life there.

In the introduction to the book, he wrote, in pages 19 and 20, the following:

"It was a beautiful country through which we had just passed, but it had presented no charms to weary eyes that were compelled to view it through a line of hostile bayonets; we felt but little sympathy for the beautiful; on our haggard countenances only this was written: 'Give us rest, and food.'

"On the evening of the same day, our sorry column was marched through the streets of Richmond from the depot of the Virginia Central Railroad to the Libby Prison. The gloomy and forbidding exterior of the prison, and the pale, emaciated faces starring vacantly at us through the bars were repulsive enough, but it was at least a haven of the rest from the weary fast-march, and from the goad of the urging bayonet. Had we known that we were entering this loathsome prison-house not to leave it again for many, many weary days and months, more than one heart would have grown faint with a mournful presentiment, for there were among us some who were doomed never to recross its threshold as living men."

== Commander in Cuba's Ten Years' War ==
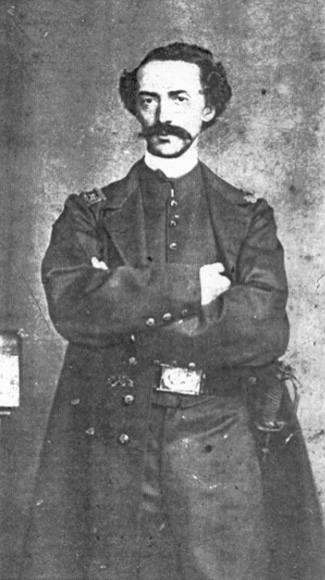
Federico's brother Capt. Adolfo Fernández Cavada

After the war, Fernández Cavada was appointed United States consul at Trinidad, Cuba. Fernández Cavada met and befriended General Thomas Jordan, who was chief of staff of the Cuban Liberation Army under the provincial government presided by Carlos Manuel de Céspedes. Jordan was a United States citizen who had served as a general in the Confederate army during the American Civil War.

The friendship inspired Fernández Cavada to resign his position as consul upon the Cuban insurrection against Spanish rule, a conflict that became known as Cuba's Ten Years' War (1868–78). Together with his brother Adolfo, who had resigned from his appointment as consul to Cienfuegos, Federico joined the insurgents. He was named General for the District of Trinidad, commander-in-chief of the Cinco Villas. On January 5, 1869, Fernández Cavada established the "Logia Luz del Sur" (Southern Light Lodge) in Trinidad, which was used as an active recruiting center for insurgents.

On April 4, 1870, Fernández Cavada was named commander-in-chief of all the Cuban forces. He became known as "General Candela" (General Fire) because of his battle tactic of burning and destroying Spanish property.

Fernández Cavada wrote an article about the beauty of the Caves of Bellamar, located near the town of Matanzas in the northern coast of Cuba. The article was published in Harper's New Monthly Magazine in November 1870. He describes the Caves of Bellamar in the following way:

"Although discovered but a few years since, already enjoys a world-wide reputation. At the present day no visitor to Cuba fails to repair to that wondrous subterranean palace, unrivalled, perhaps, in the grandeur of its stalactite masses and the exquisite detail of its starry decorations. Easy of access from Havana by railway, and commodiously and safely prepared for the reception of visitors, it fully repays one for a day's absence from the busy scenes of the capital."

== Death ==
Federico's eldest brother Emilio remained in Philadelphia, where he was an active fundraiser for the Cuban insurrection. He relayed the news which he received from his brothers to the exiled strategists and other Cuban exiles in Philadelphia and New York. The funds he raised were funneled together with arms and munitions to the insurgent forces in the island.

In 1871, Fernández Cavada took charge of the military division in Camagüey and, together with fellow rebel Bernabé Varona, planned an armed invasion on the western coast of Cuba. The Cuban Liberation Army approved a resolution to permit Fernández Cavada to travel to the United States. He intended to seek support among his military contacts for the cause of Cuban independence. He traveled to "Cayo Cruz" in the northern coast of Camagüey to wait for his transportation; but he was captured by the Spanish gunboat Neptuno in 1871 and taken to Puerto Principe. He was transferred to the town of Nuevitas from Puerto Principe. Tried by the Spanish authorities, he was sentenced to die by firing squad. Generals George Gordon Meade, Daniel Sickles and Ulysses S. Grant, his military compatriots in the United States, attempted in vain to obtain his release. Fernández Cavada was executed on July 1, 1871. His last words were "Adios Cuba, para siempre" (Goodbye Cuba, forever).

== Legacy ==
- On February 24, 1929, a monument honoring the memory of those who participated in the Ten Years' War and who were executed by Spanish firing squads was erected on Finley Avenue in the town of Nuevitas located in the Province of Camagüey. Among the men who were honored besides Fernández Cavada were Francisco Muñoz Rubalcaba, José Inclán Risco, Oscar de Céspedes and Antonio Luaces.
- The Province of Cienfuegos also honored his memory. A modern medical poli-clinic named "Policlínico-Facultad "Federico Fernández Cavada" located in the section of La Horquita in Cienfuegos, was named in his honor.
- The Museo Nacional de Bellas Artes de Cuba has oil paintings by Fernández Cavada on permanent exhibition.

== Awards and decorations ==
Fernández Cavada's awards and decorations include the following:

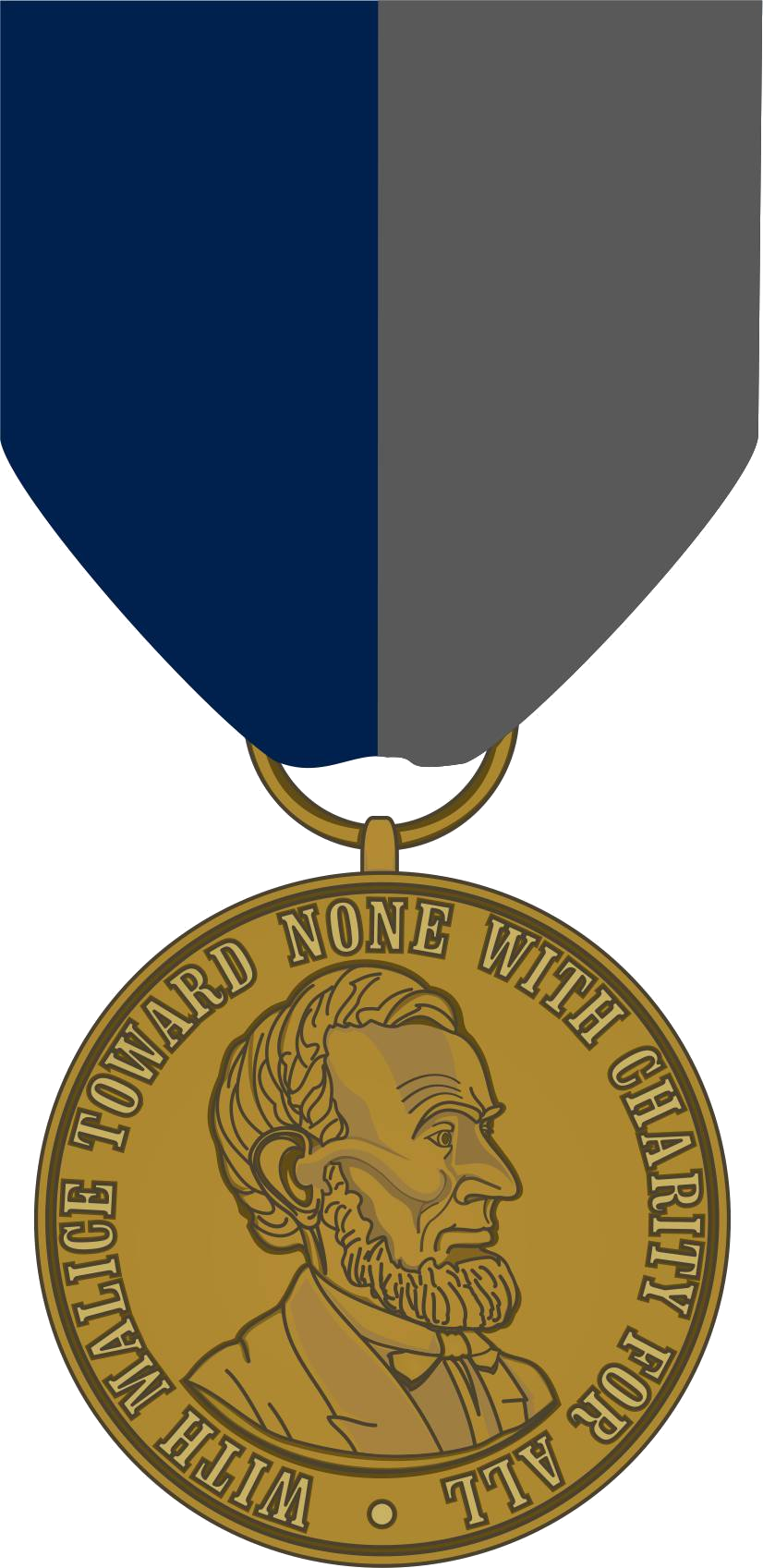
Army Civil War Campaign Medal

== See also ==
- Hispanics in the American Civil War
- Adolfo Fernández Cavada
