= Pedro Cavadas (footballer) =

Portuguese footballer (born 1992)

Personal information
- Full name: Pedro Manuel Cavadas Ferreira
- Date of birth: 6 March 1992 (age 34)
- Place of birth: Alfena, Portugal
- Height: 1.87 m (6 ft 1 1/2 in)
- Position: Goalkeeper

Team information
- Current team: Gondomar
- Number: 12

Youth career
- 2000–2003: Alfenense
- 2003–2004: Pasteleira
- 2004–2007: Boavista
- 2007–2008: Pasteleira
- 2008–2011: Boavista

Senior career*
| Years | Team | Apps | (Gls) |
| 2011–2012 | Boavista | 15 | (0) |
| 2012–2014 | Braga B | 10 | (0) |
| 2014–2015 | Belenenses | 0 | (0) |
| 2015–2016 | Pedras Rubras | 4 | (0) |
| 2016– | Gondomar | 26 | (0) |
- * Club domestic league appearances and goals as of 9 April 2017

Pedro Manuel Cavadas Ferreira (born 6 March 1992), known as Pedro Cavadas, is a Portuguese footballer who plays for Gondomar as a goalkeeper.

== Club career ==
He made his professional debut in the Segunda Liga for Braga B on 2 September 2012 in a game against Tondela.
