= Pedro Cavadas (surgeon) =

Spanish surgeon

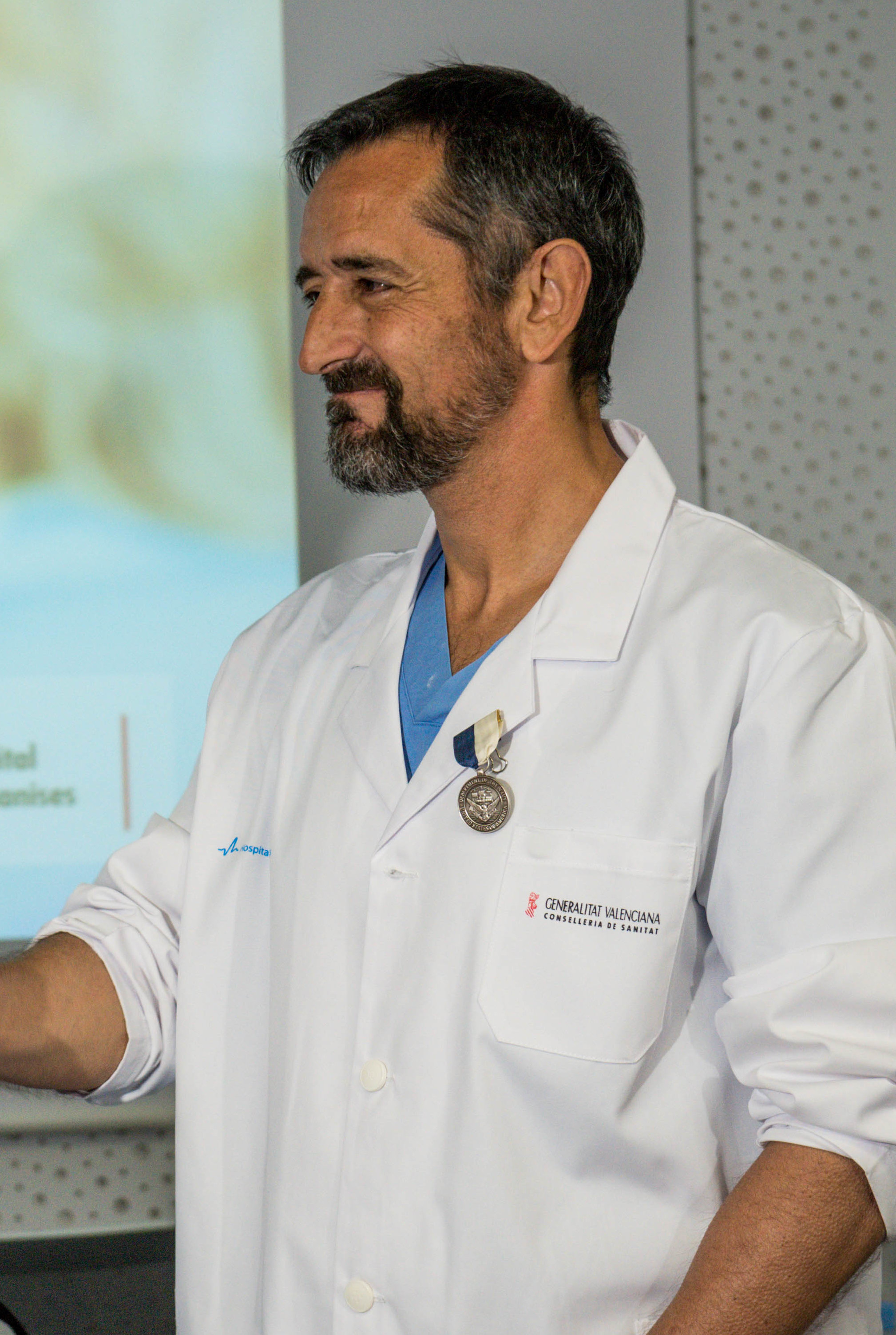
Image of Pedro Cavadas

Pedro Carlos Cavadas Rodríguez (born 4 November 1967, in Valencia) is a Spanish surgeon.

== Education ==
Cavadas graduated as a doctor from the University of Valencia in 1989 with honours, and served as an intern at Hospital La Fe de Valencia, where he specialised in plastic surgery.

== Notable Surgeries ==
In December 2006, he performed the first double hand transplant on a woman.

In July 2011, he performed a world-first double leg transplant on a 20-year-old male amputee. The double leg transplant took 10 hours to perform due to connecting nerves, blood vessels, muscles, tendons and bone structure. In June 2013, the unnamed patient encountered an unrelated illness which "forced the man to stop taking anti-rejection drugs". His legs were then required to be amputated once again.
