= List of stateside Puerto Ricans =

This is a list of Puerto Ricans in the continental United States and Hawaii, including people born in the United States proper of Puerto Rican descent and Puerto Ricans who live in the United States proper (thus, stateside). Since those born in Puerto Rico are US citizens, it is easier to migrate to the United States proper from Puerto Rico than from anywhere else in Latin America. Currently, more than 5.5 million Puerto Ricans and their descendants live in the United States proper, significantly more than the population of Puerto Rico itself. The following list contains notable members of the Puerto Rican community.

== Television show hosts ==
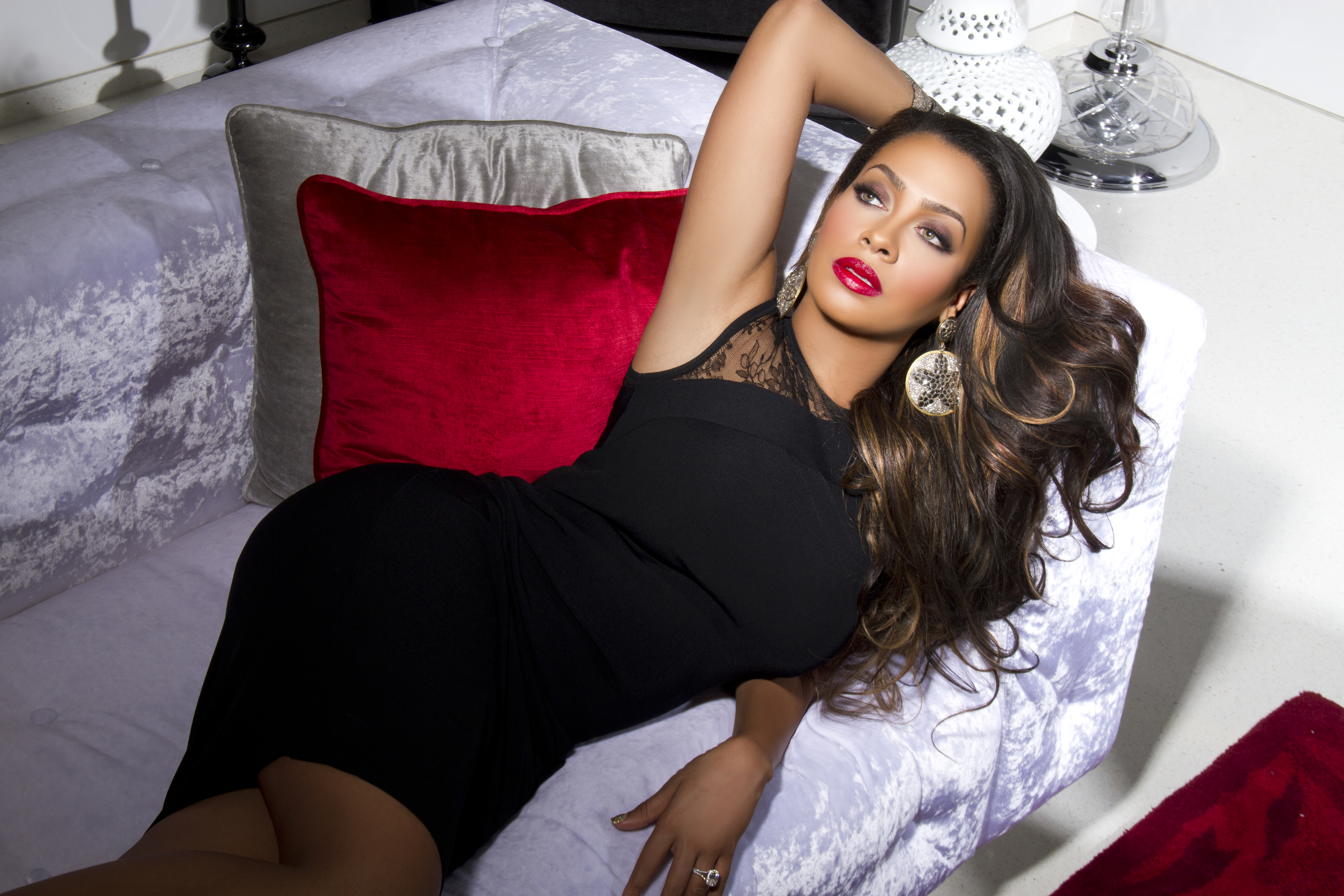
La La Anthony

- La La Anthony – television personality, video jockey and actress; host of MTV's TRL
- Daisy Martinez – actress, model, chef, television personality and author; host of PBS television series Daisy Cooks!
- John Melendez – television writer and former radio personality
- Rogelio Mills – television personality; Puerto Rican/Black Hispanic American
- Antonio Sánchez – radio and television personality, show host and producer
- Fernando Allende – (Mexican/Puerto Rican host)hosts Miss World international live telecast to 153 countries for the fourth time in a row. Also hosted Buscando Estrellas; Spanish speaking equivalent to star search. Also hosted all the promos for the soccer World Cup and starred in the successful show "Hot Hot Hot", produced by Dick Clark.
- Vanna White – co-host of Wheel of Fortune (American game show)

== Business ==
- Kimberly Casiano – President and Chief Operating Officer of Casiano Communications
- María Elena Holly – Puerto Rican widow of rock and roll pioneer Buddy Holly; lives in Texas and New York
- Ralph Mercado – promoter of Latin American music, including Latin jazz, Latin rock, merengue and salsa; established a network of businesses
- Lisette Nieves – founder of Atrevete Latino Youth, Inc., an organization which focuses on the educational and leadership training of young Latinos
- Samuel A. Ramirez, Sr. – first Hispanic to launch a successful investment banking firm
- Angel Ramos – founder of Telemundo, the second largest Spanish-language television network in the United States
- Xavier Romeu – Executive Director of Puerto Rico Industrial Development Company
- Herb Scannell – President of BBC Worldwide America
- Nina Tassler – television executive; President of CBS Entertainment since September 2004
- Richard Velazquez – first Puerto Rican automotive designer for Porsche; first Puerto Rican Xbox product planner; co-founder and President of NSHMBA Seattle
- Maria Vizcarrondo-De Soto – President and CEO of the United Way of Essex and West Hudson

== Actors and actresses ==
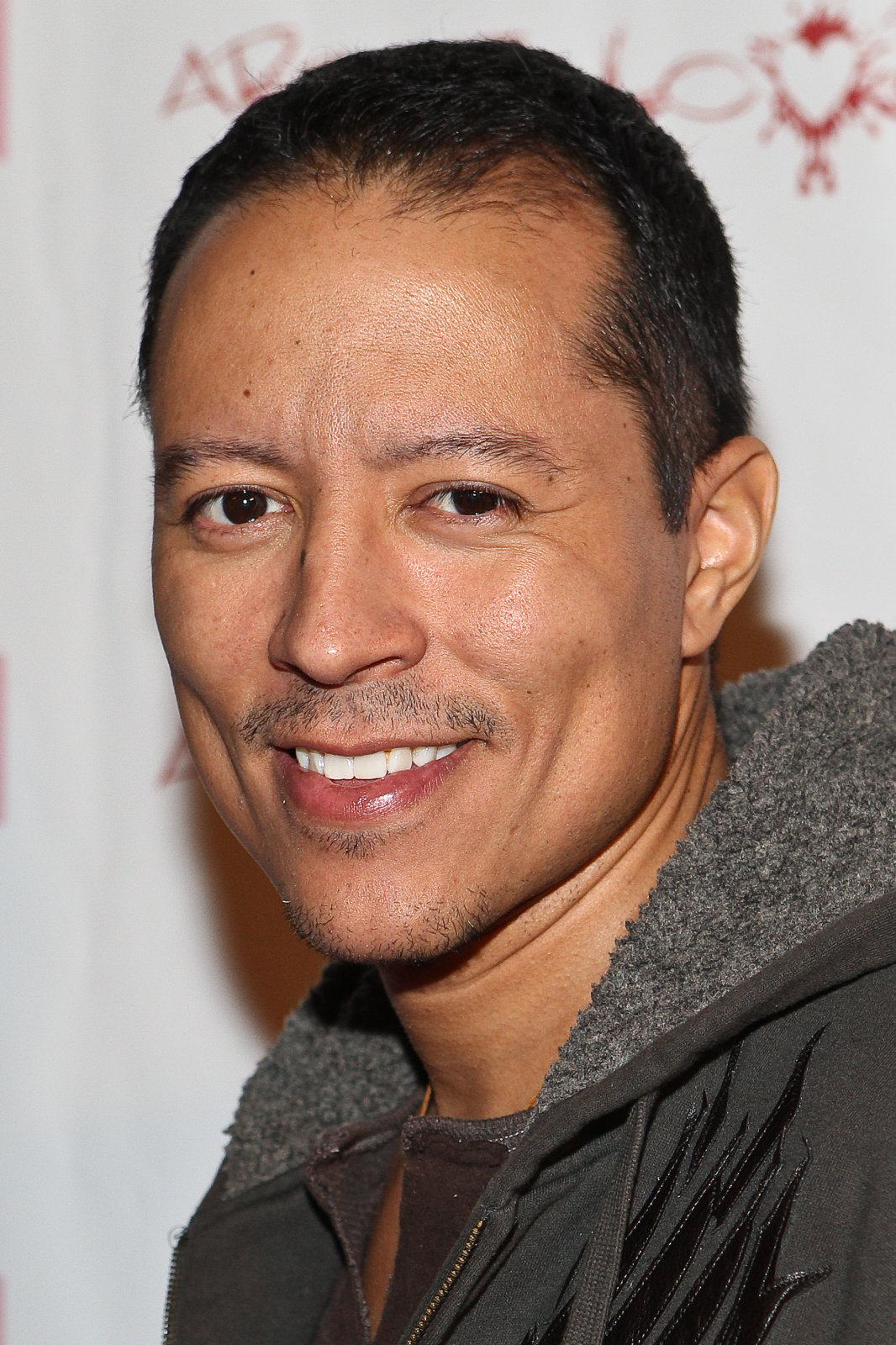
Yancey Arias

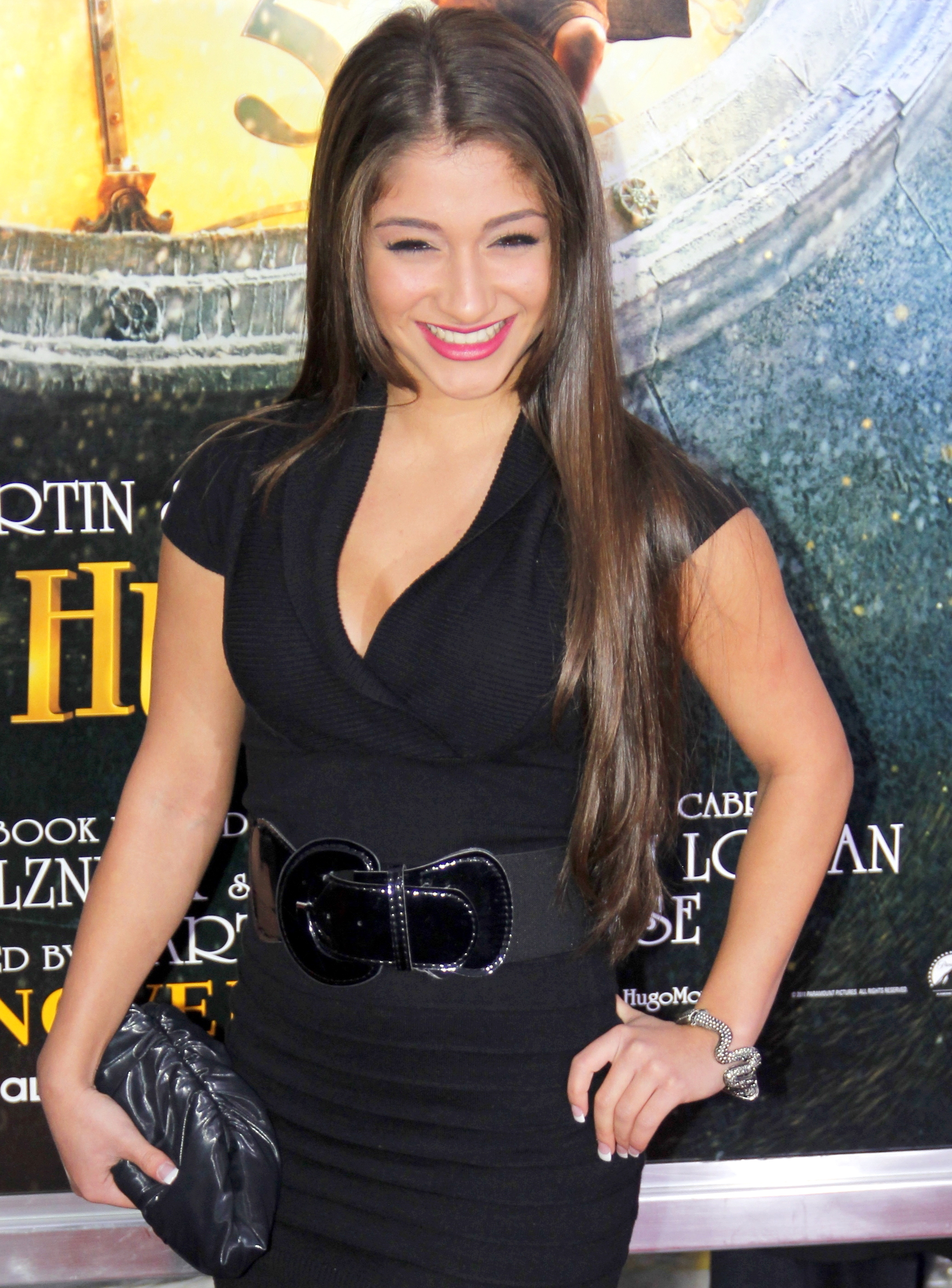
Raquel Castro

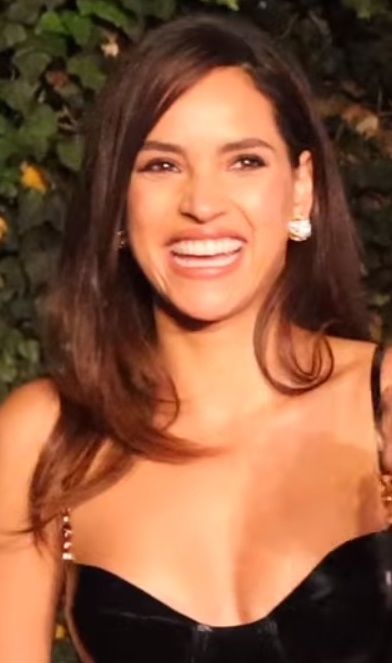
Adria Arjona

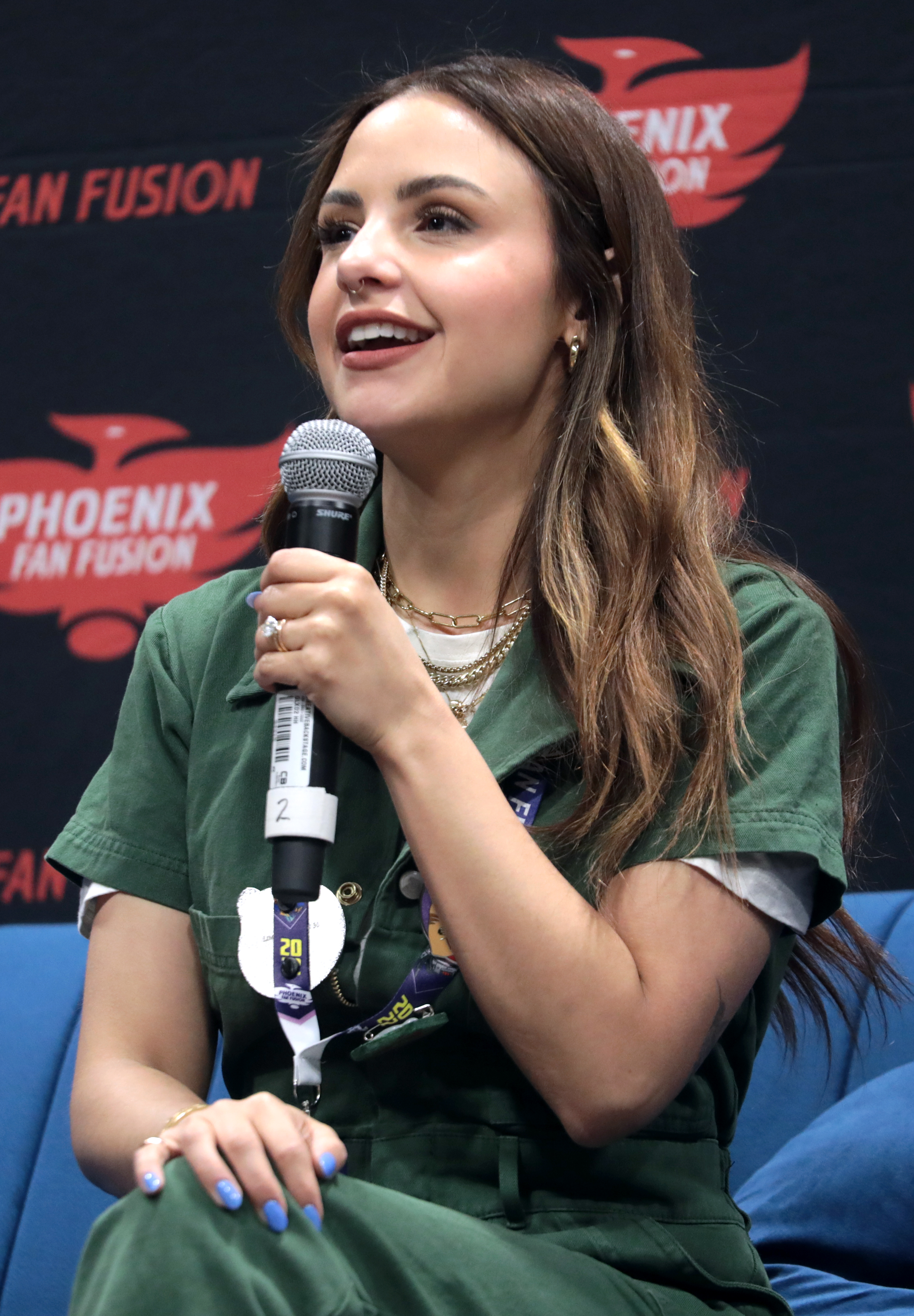
Aimee Carrero

- Kirk Acevedo – actor, HBO series Oz, Band of Brothers, Fringe
- Fernando Allende – actor (Mexican/Puerto Rican)
- Daniella Alonso – actress
- Trini Alvarado – actress, flamenco dancer, and flamenco Singer
- Tyler Alvarez – American actor of Puerto Rican and Cuban descent (Every Witch Way, American Vandal)
- Philip Anthony-Rodriguez – actor and singer
- Victor Argo – actor
- Adria Arjona – actress
- Yancey Arias – American actor of Colombian and Puerto Rican descent
- Rick Aviles – stand-up comedian and actor, Ghost
- Jake T. Austin – actor, Wizards of Waverly Place
- Charlotte Ayanna – actress and former Miss Teen USA
- Adrienne Bailon – singer and actress
- Rosa Blasi – actress
- Diego Boneta – American actor and singer; father is Mexican, mother was born in the US, to a Puerto Rican father and Spanish mother
- Aimee Carrero – actress
- Paul Calderón – actor
- Nydia Caro – actress and singer
- David Castro – actor
- Raquel Castro – teen actress and singer
- Míriam Colón – actress and founder and director of the Puerto Rican Traveling Theater in New York City
- Liza Colón-Zayas – actress and playwright
- Kevin Corrigan – actor
- Auliʻi Cravalho – actress
- Alexis Cruz – actor
- Wilson Cruz – actor

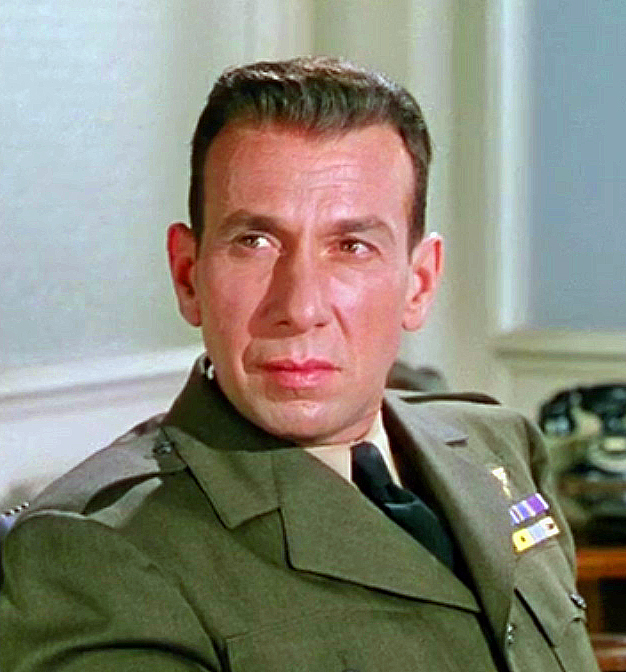
José Ferrer

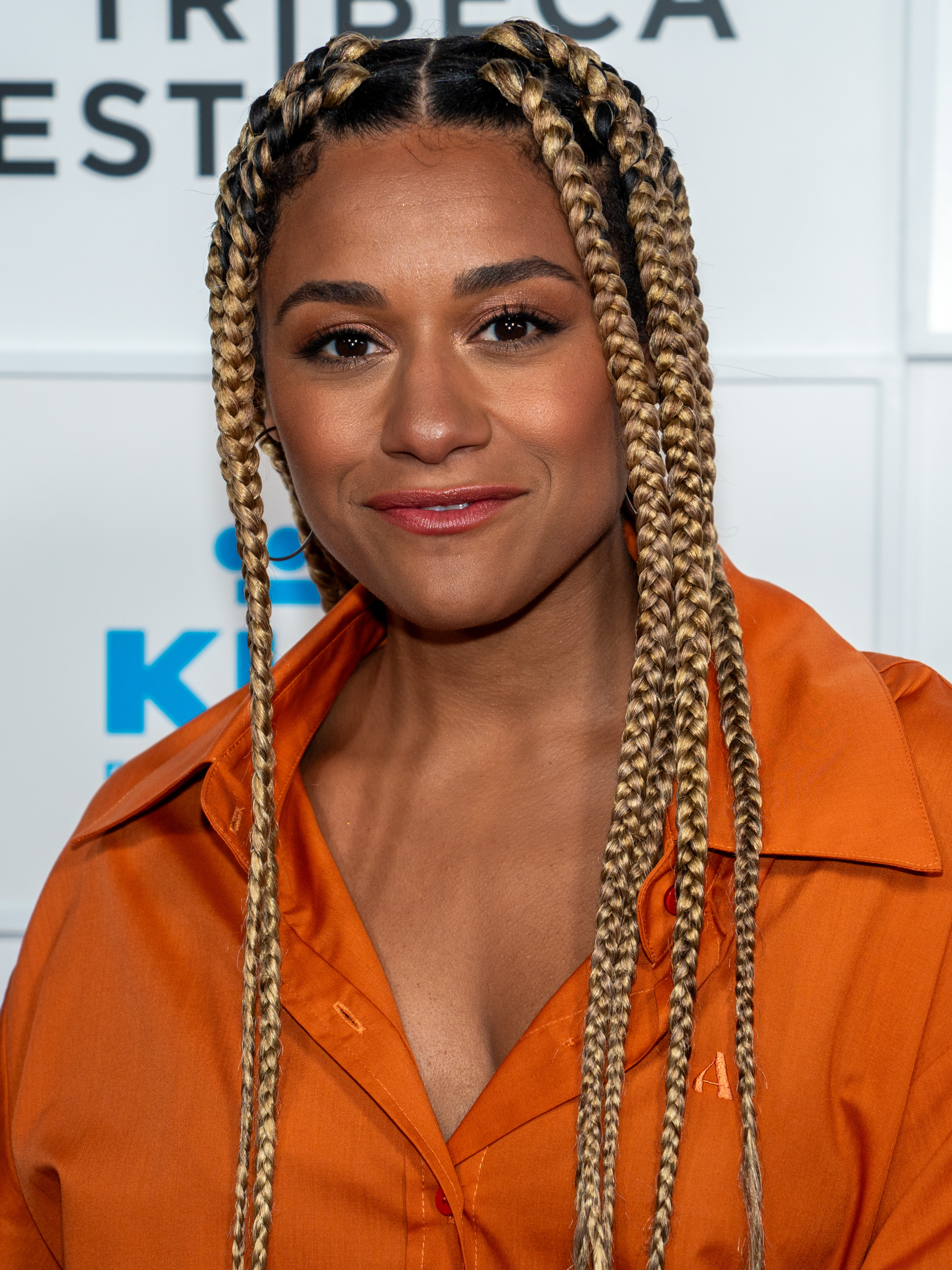
Ariana DeBose

- Henry Darrow – actor of stage and film
- Raúl Dávila – actor, All My Children
- Rosario Dawson – actress
- Roxann Dawson – actress, Star Trek: Voyager; producer and director
- Ariana DeBose - American actress. Her father is Puerto Rican.
- Idalis DeLeón – actress, singer, and television host
- Michael DeLorenzo – actor
- Melonie Diaz – actress
- Sully Diaz – actress and singer, Coralito
- Shabba Doo – actor, dancer, choreographer, and director
- Héctor Elizondo – actor
- Erik Estrada – actor
- Antonio Fargas – actor, 1970s blaxploitation films

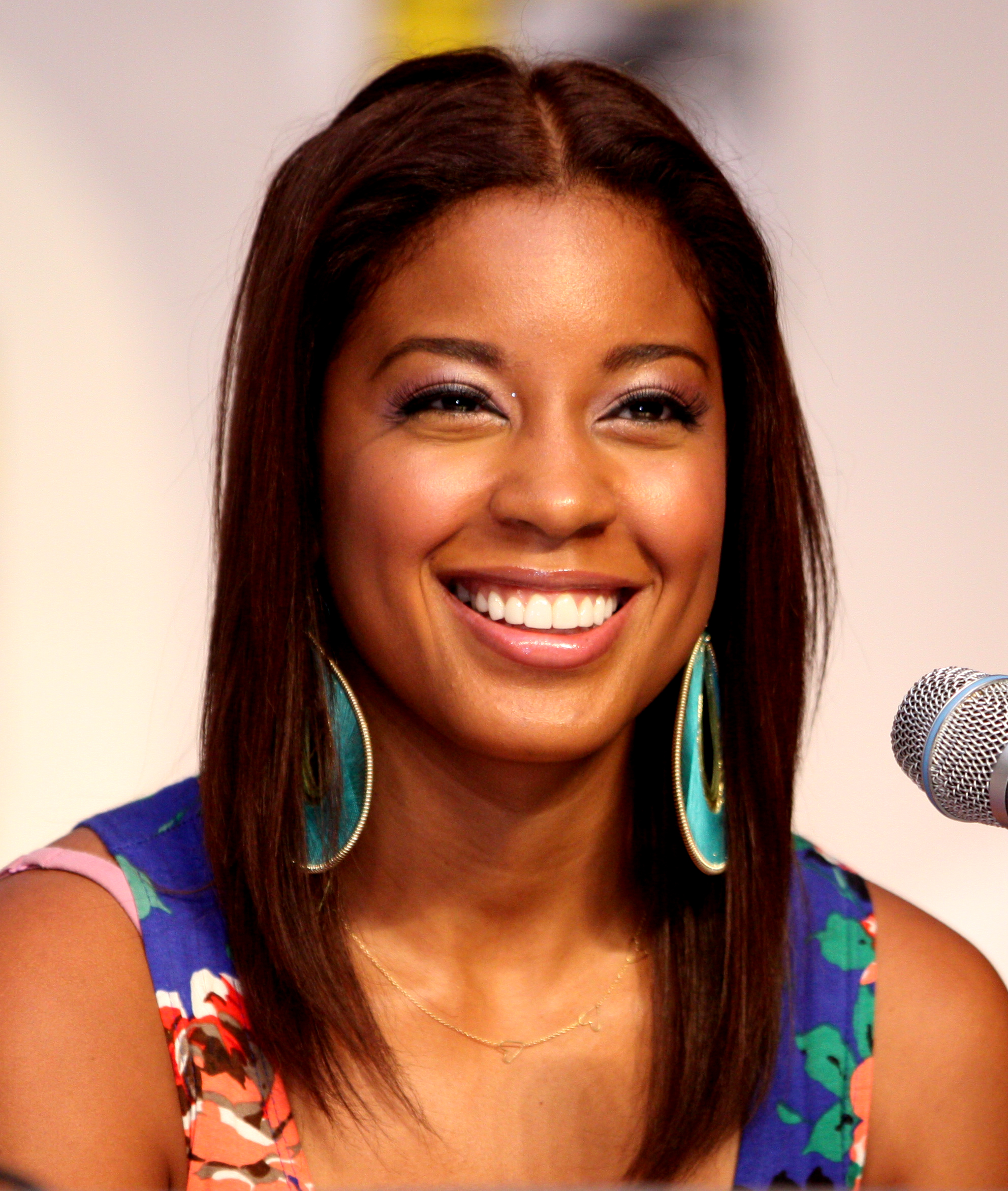
Reagan Gomez-Preston

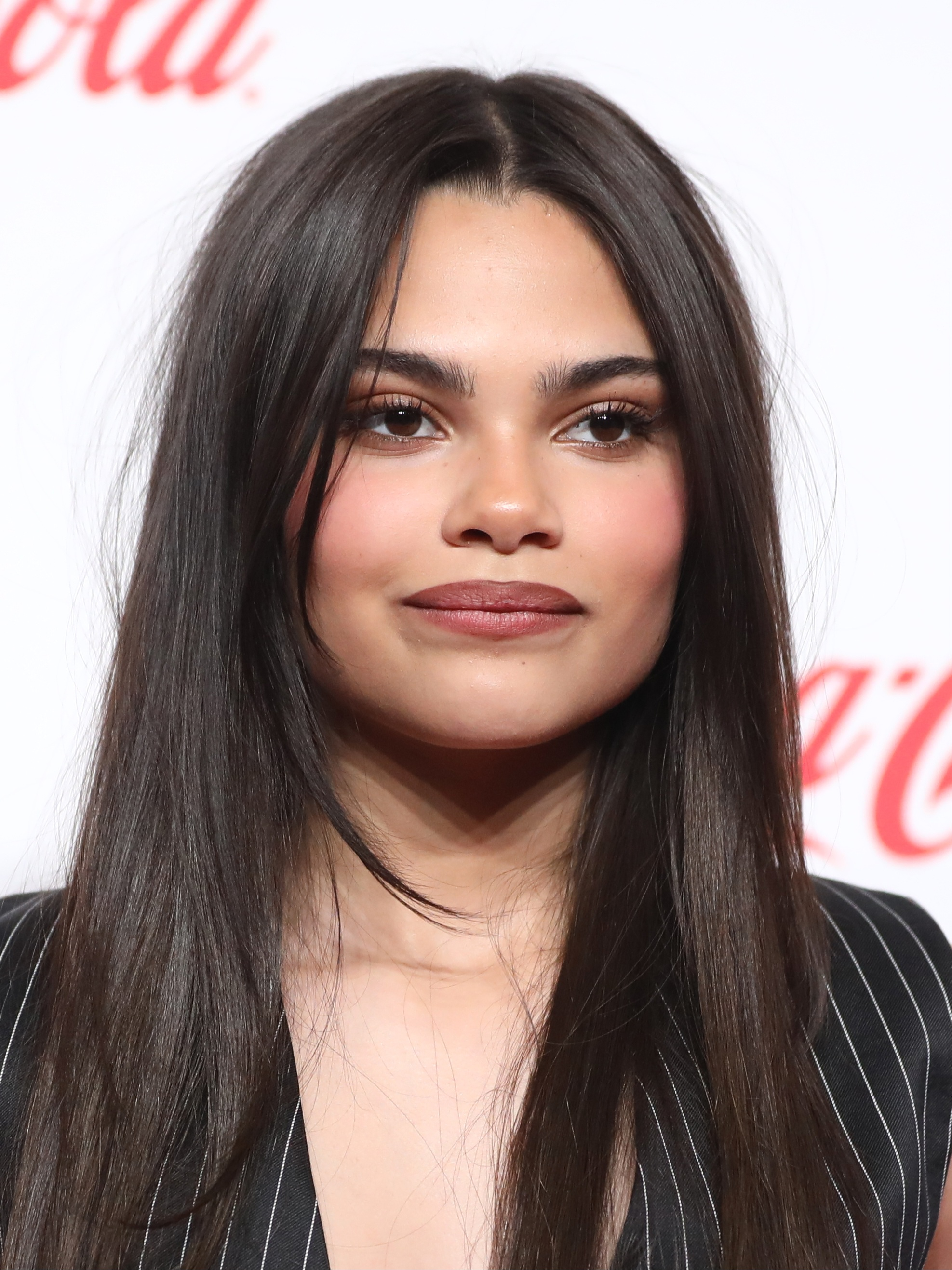
Ariana Greenblatt

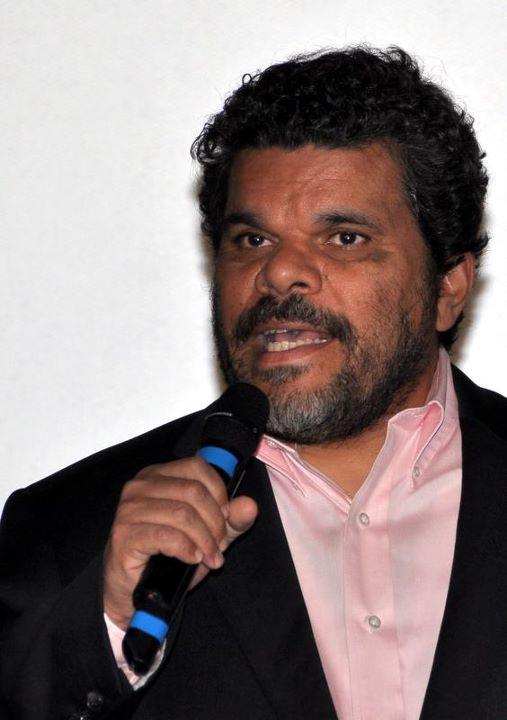
Luis Guzman

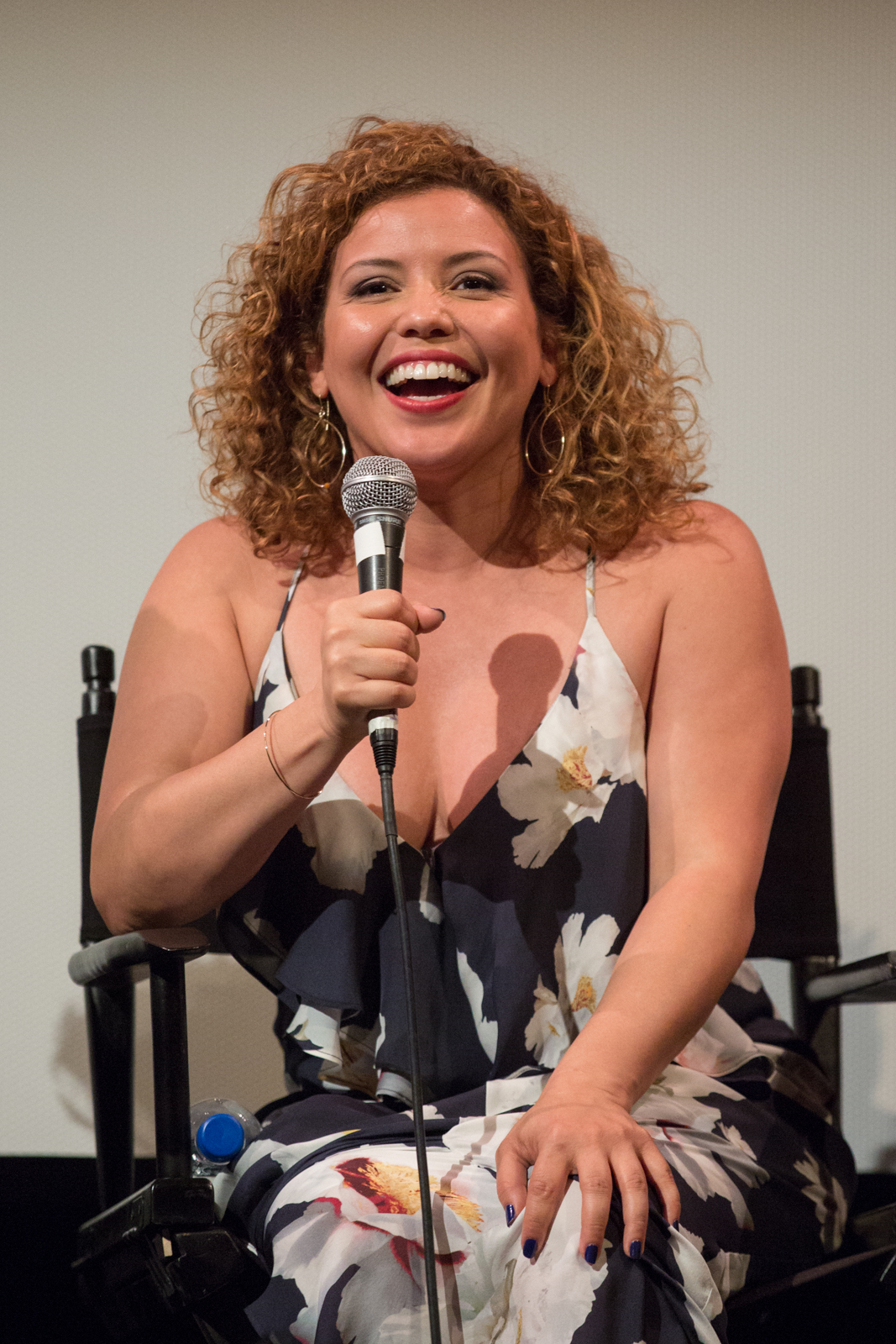
Justina Machado

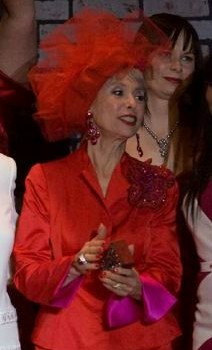
Rita Moreno

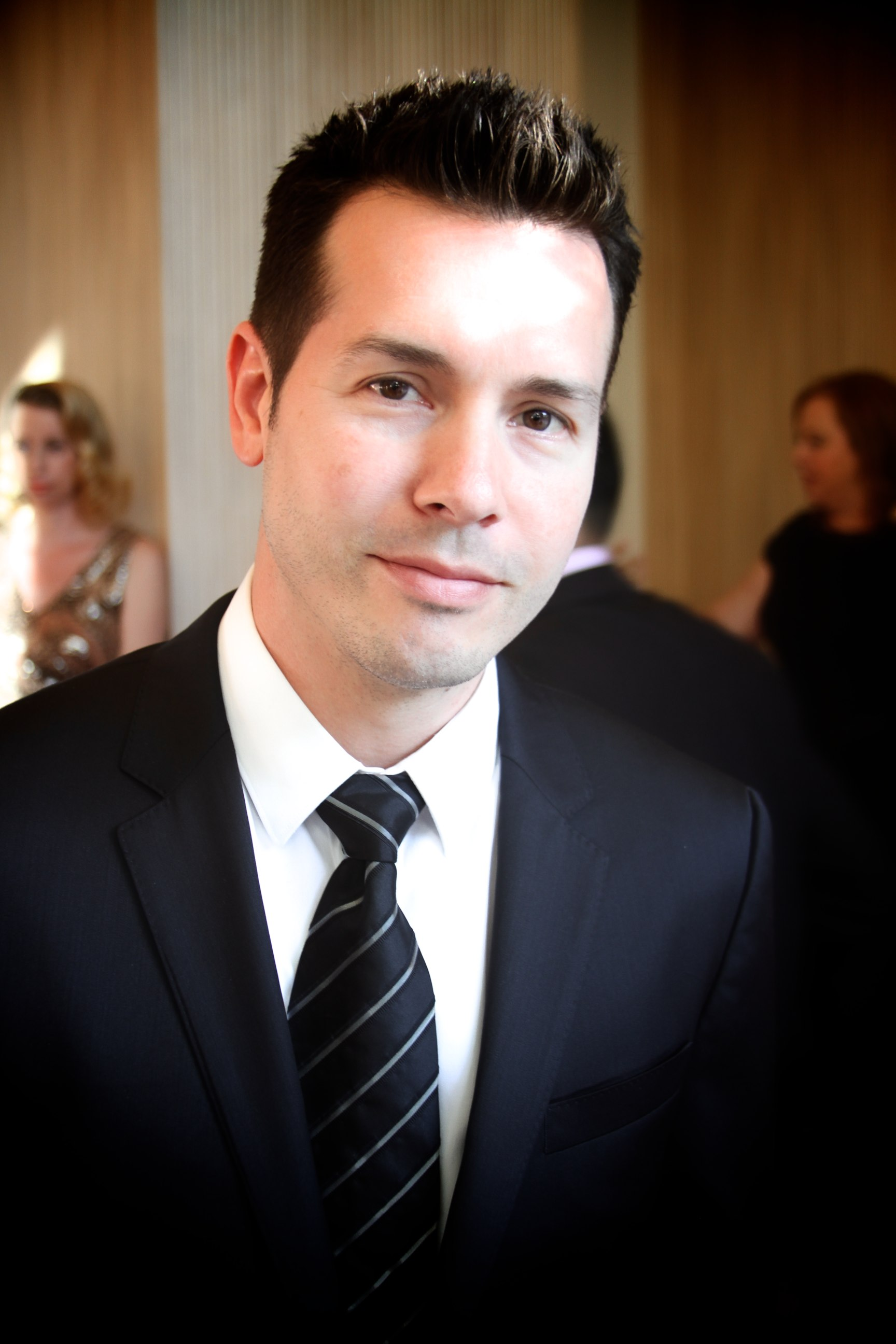
Jon Seda

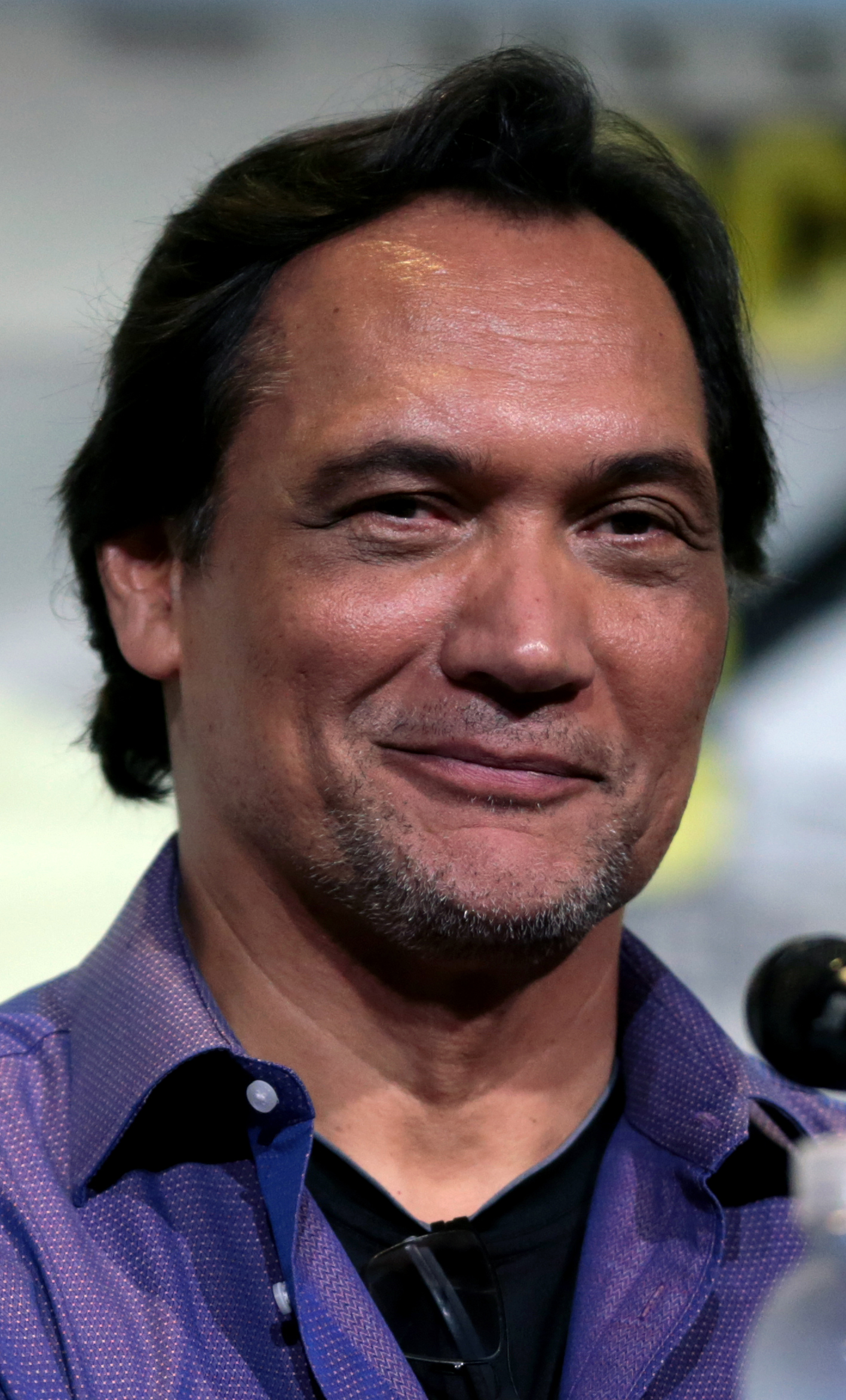
Jimmy Smits

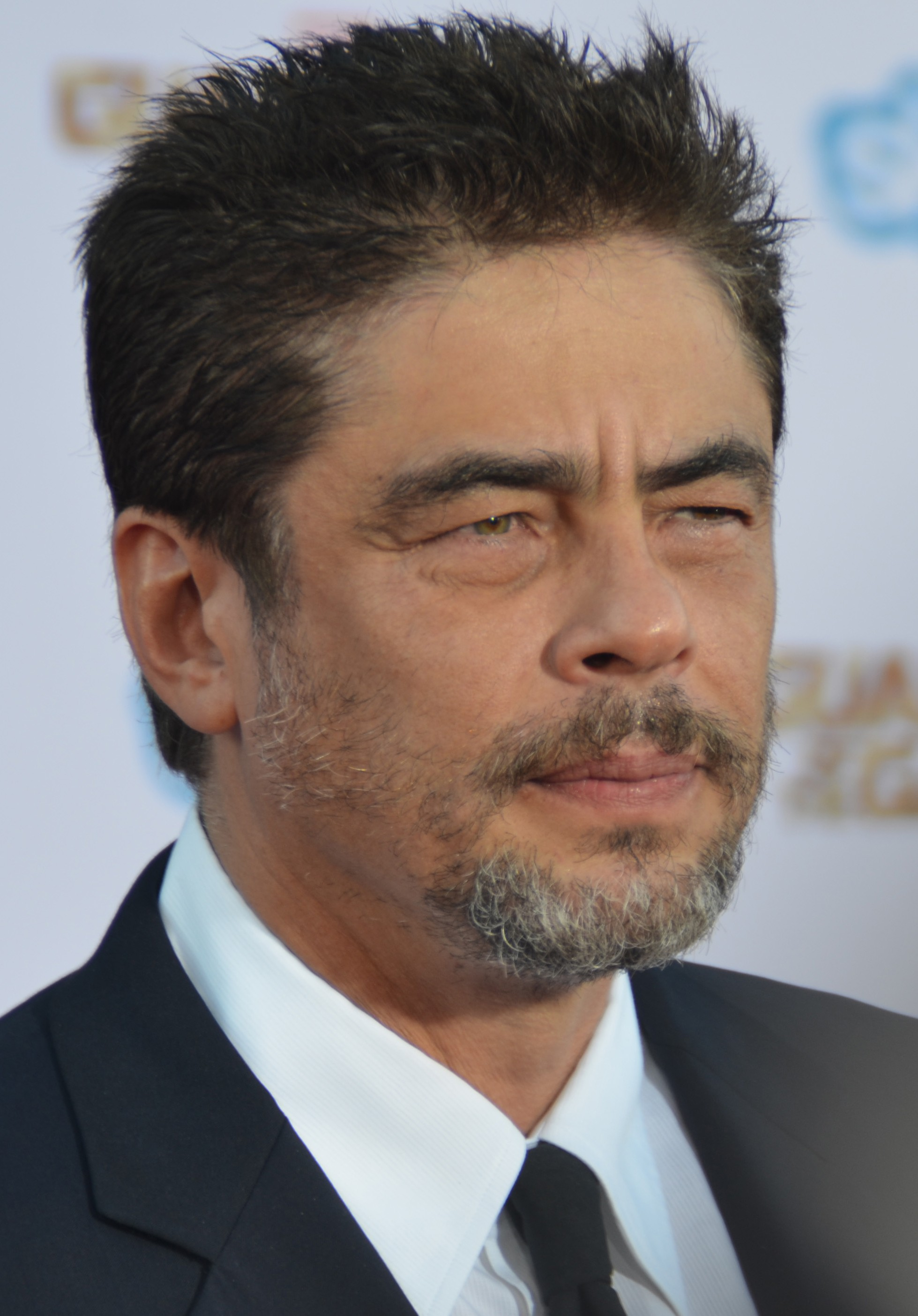
Benicio del Toro

- José Ferrer – actor
- Miguel Ferrer – actor, Crossing Jordan; son of José Ferrer
- Franky G – film and television actor
- Gloria Garayua – film and television actress
- Aimee Garcia – father is from San Juan
- Mayte García – American dancer, actress, singer, and choreographer
- Marilyn Ghigliotti – character actress, Clerks
- Ian Gomez – actor, known for his comedic TV work, Felicity, Cougar Town
- Marga Gomez – comedian, playwright, and humorist
- Reagan Gomez-Preston – American actress of Puerto Rican and African descent
- Rick Gonzalez – actor, film Coach Carter, television series Reaper
- La'Myia Good – actress
- Meagan Good – actress
- Ariana Greenblatt – American actress of Jewish and Puerto Rican descent
- Camille Guaty – actress
- Luis Guzmán – actor
- April Lee Hernández – actress
- Joseline Hernandez – Television Reality Personality, Singer Love and HipHop
- Kristin Herrera – actress, Zoey 101
- Jon Huertas – American actor, Castle; of Puerto Rican and African descent
- David Iacono – actor
- Mark Indelicato – actor and singer, Ugly Betty
- Vincent Irizarry – actor
- Shar Jackson – American actress; of African, Puerto Rican and Mexican descent
- Cherie Johnson – American actress, Punky Brewster, Family Matters; of African American and Puerto Rican descent
- Raúl Juliá (1940–1994) – Puerto Rican actor and playwright
- Victoria Justice – American actress, singer, and songwriter; mother is Puerto Rican
- Eva LaRue – American actress, CSI: Miami; of French, Puerto Rican, Dutch, and Scottish ancestries
- Steve Lemme – American actor, writer, and producer, Super Troopers; of Puerto Rican, Argentine, and French descent.
- Adrianne Leon – American actress, singer-songwriter, guitarist; of Puerto Rican, Italian and Canadian descent
- Sunshine Logroño – actor, radio announcer, television show host, singer, comedy writer, entrepreneur and comedian; American born and of Puerto Rican descent; raised in Puerto Rico
- Priscilla Lopez – American singer, dancer, and actress; of Puerto Rican descent
- Gina Lynn – Puerto Rican pornographic actress; raised in New Jersey
- Justina Machado – actress, Six Feet Under
- Kayla Maisonet (1999- ) American actress of Puerto Rican and Russian descent
- Sonia Manzano – American actress and writer, Sesame Street
- Eddie Marrero – American actor
- Tony Martinez (1920–2002) – Puerto Rican actor, singer, and bandleader; The Real McCoys TV series; US resident
- Ricardo Medina, Jr. – American actor, Power Rangers Wild Force; of Puerto Rican descent
- Jorge Merced – New York-based Puerto Rican actor, theater director, and gay activist
- Lin-Manuel Miranda (born 1980) – American actor, composer, lyricist, singer, rapper, actor, producer, and playwright, known by his roles in Broadway musicals. He is of mostly Puerto Rican descent, but he also is a quarter Mexican.
- Ruby Modine – American actress to a Puerto Rican mother.
- Esai Morales – American actor, La Bamba
- Rita Moreno – Puerto Rican singer, dancer and actress; US resident
- Frankie Muniz – American actor, Malcolm in the Middle; father is Puerto Rican, mother is of Italian and Irish descent
- Christian Navarro – American actor of Puerto Rican descent (13 Reasons Why)
- Taylor Negron – American writer, actor, and stand-up comedian; of Puerto Rican descent
- Micaela Nevárez – Puerto Rican actress; has appeared in independent and European films; family immigrated to the US when she was 10
- Amaury Nolasco – Puerto Rican actor, television series Prison Break, film Transformers
- Miguel A. Núñez Jr. – American actor of Puerto Rican and Dominican descent
- Tony Oliver – Puerto Rican born American voice actor (Robotech, Fate/stay night, Lupin the Third).
- Karen Olivo – American actress; of Dominican, Puerto Rican, Native American, and Chinese descent

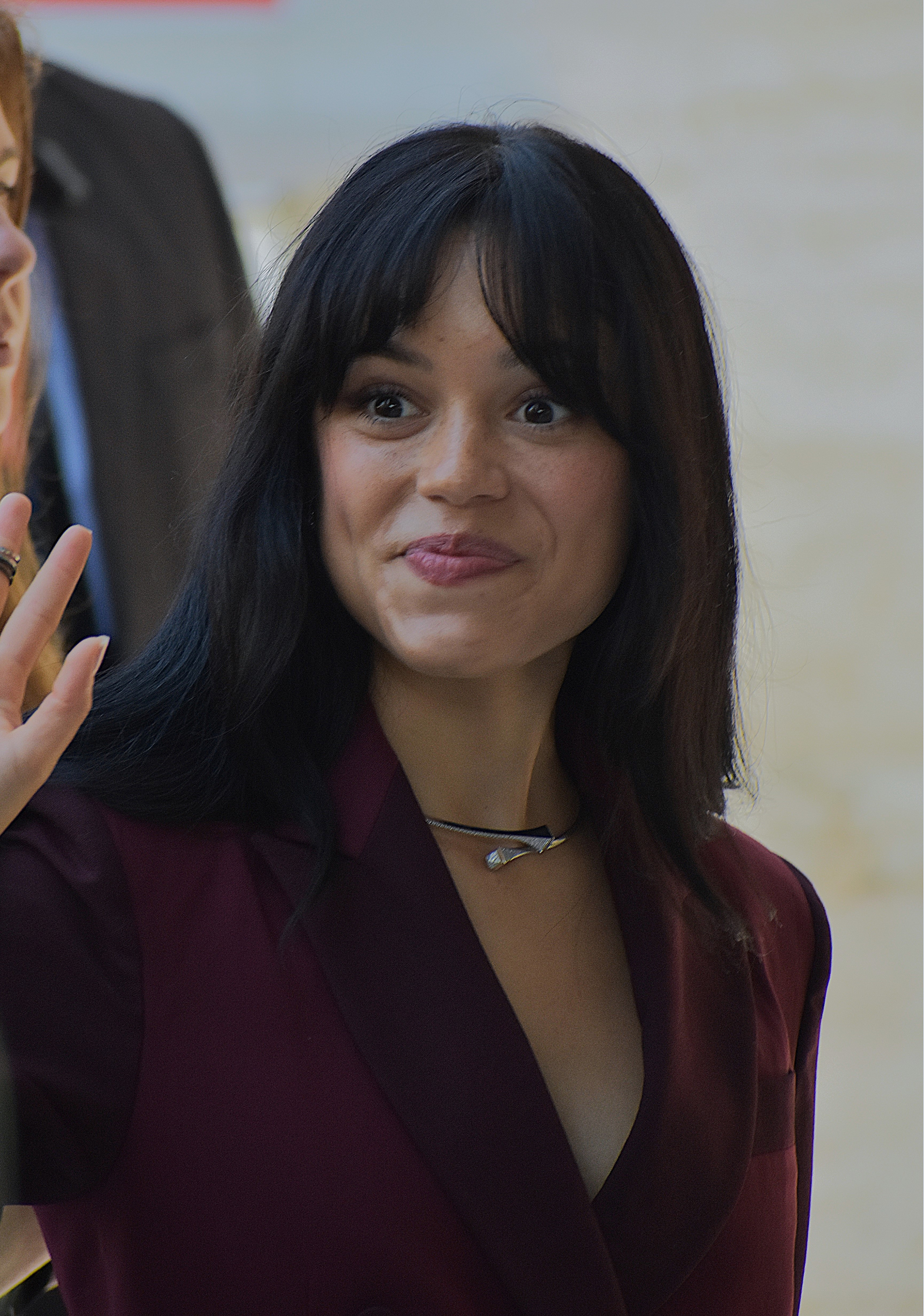
Jenna Ortega

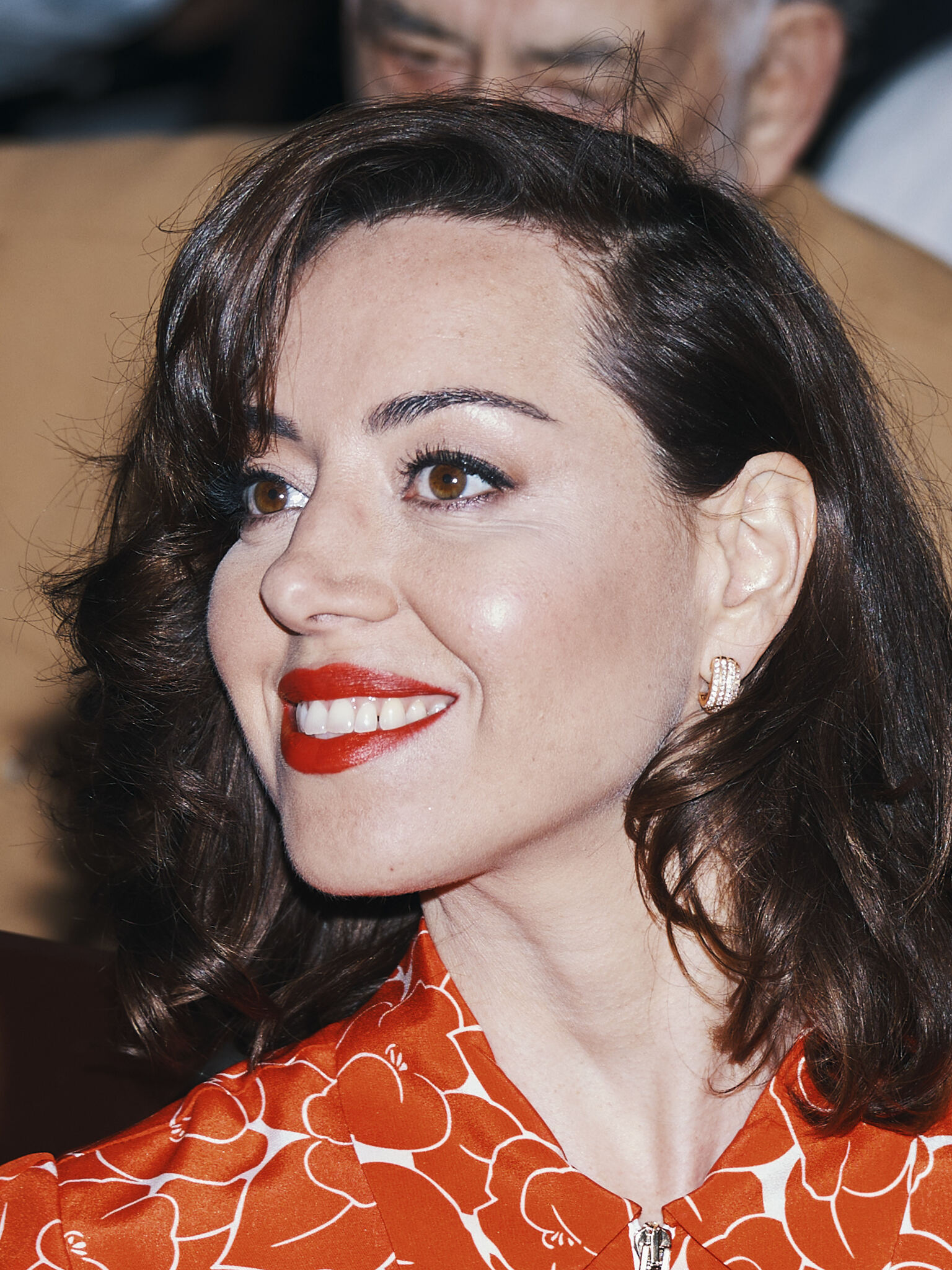
Aubrey Plaza

- Jenna Ortega – American actress; father of Mexican descent and mother of Mexican and Puerto Rican descent
- Ana Ortiz – American actress and singer; of Puerto Rican and Irish descent
- John Ortiz – American actor and artistic director/co-founder of LAByrinth Theater Company
- Ronnie Ortiz-Magro – American television personality and actor; Italian-American father and Puerto Rican mother
- Lana Parrilla – American actress; Sicilian mother and Puerto Rican father
- Rosie Perez – American actress; Puerto Rican parents
- Miguel Piñero (1946–1988) – Puerto Rican playwright, actor, and co-founder of the Nuyorican Poets Café; a leading member of the Nuyorican literary movement; died in New York
- Aubrey Plaza – American actress, comedian and producer of Puerto Rican and English-Irish descent.
- Carlos Ponce – Puerto Rican actor, singer, composer and television personality; lived in Miami, Florida
- Freddie Prinze (1954–1977) – American actor and comedian of Puerto Rican and German descent
- Freddie Prinze Jr. – American actor; son of Freddie Prinze

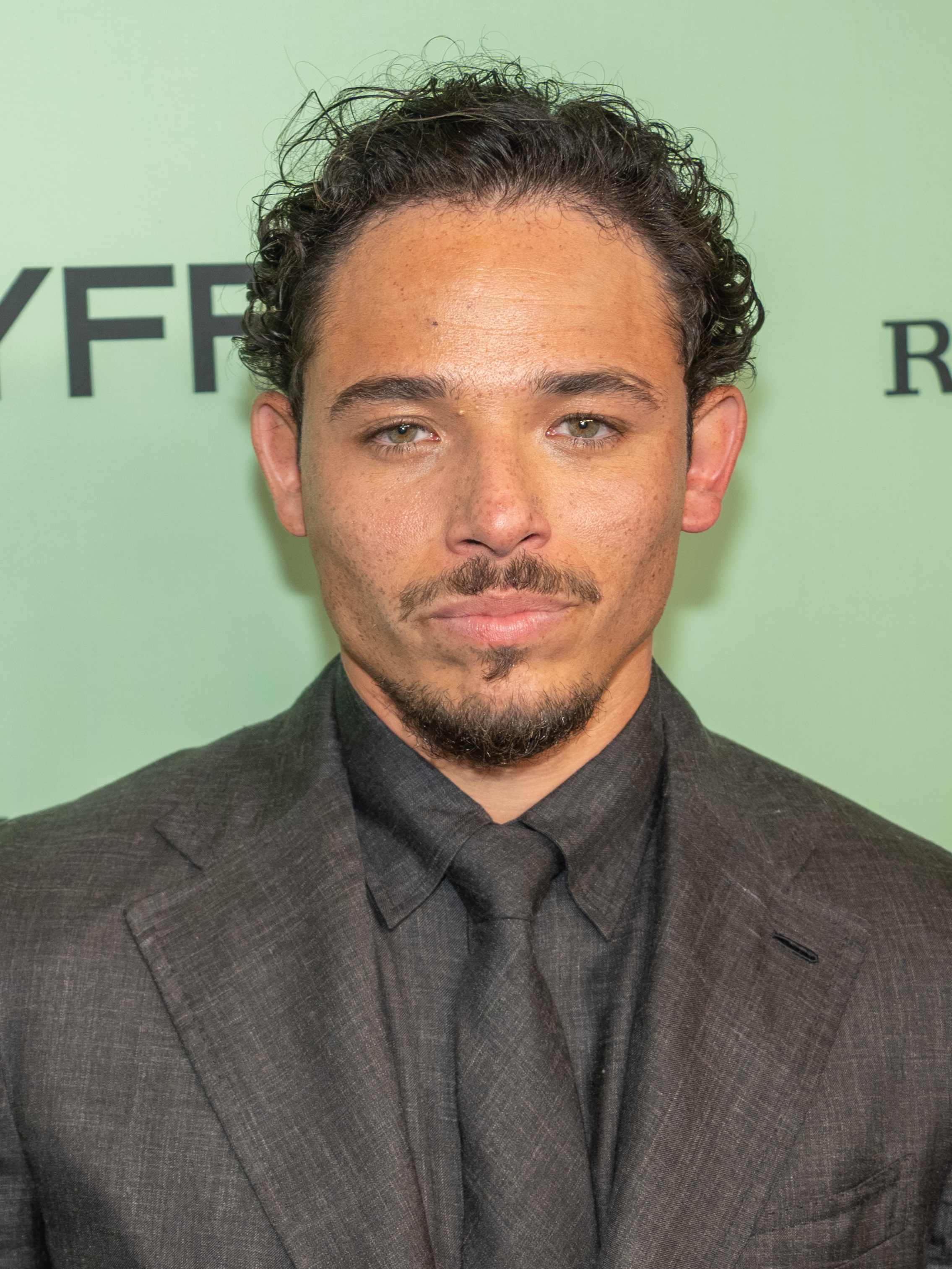
Anthony Ramos

- Anthony Ramos – American actor of Puerto Rican descent.
- Luis Antonio Ramos – Puerto Rican-born American actor, film and television
- Kamar de los Reyes – Puerto Rican born and American raised
- Armando Riesco – Puerto Rican film and television actor and voice artist
- Chita Rivera – American actress, dancer, and singer best known for her roles in musical theatre; her father was Puerto Rican
- Vanessa del Rio – retired American pornographic actress; of Cuban and Puerto Rican descent
- Chita Rivera – American actress, dancer, and singer; known for her roles in musical theater; of Puerto Rican and of Scottish and Italian descent
- José Rivera – Puerto Rican playwright living in Hollywood, California
- Marquita Rivera (1922–2002) – Puerto Rican actress, singer and dancer; dubbed the "Queen of La Conga," "Queen of Latin Rhythm," and "Latin Hurricane"
- Naya Rivera – American actress; of Puerto Rican, African American, and German descent
- Adam Rodriguez – American actor, CSI: Miami; of Puerto Rican and Cuban descent
- Elizabeth Rodriguez – American actress of Puerto Rican parents
- Freddy Rodriguez – American actor; of Puerto Rican descent
- Gina Rodriguez – American actress of Puerto Rican parents (Jane the Virgin)
- Jai Rodríguez – musician and actor, Queer Eye for the Straight Guy; of Puerto Rican and Italian descent
- Michaela Jaé Rodriguez – American actress and Singer. One of her grandparent was Puerto Rican.

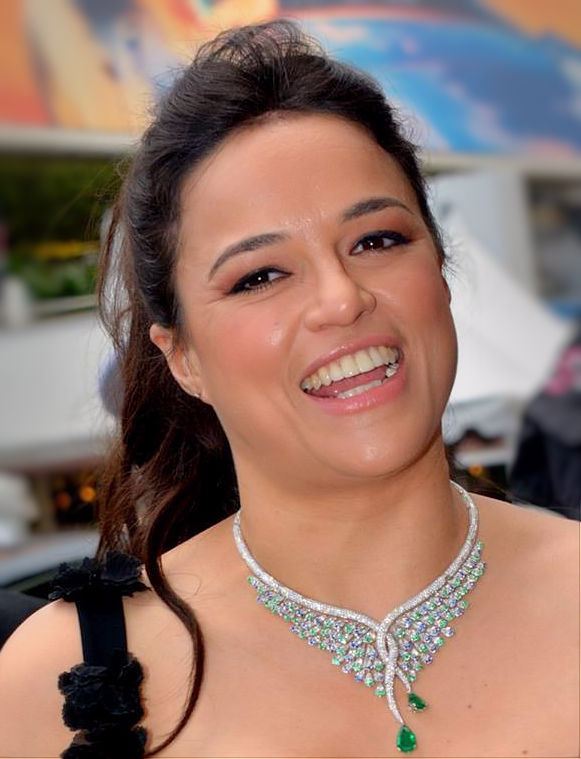
Michelle Rodriguez

- Michelle Rodríguez – American actress, Lost; father is Puerto Rican, mother is Dominican
- Ramón Rodríguez – American actor of Puerto Rican descent
- Zoe Saldaña – American actress; Dominican father and Puerto Rican mother
- Olga San Juan (1927–2009) – American actress; of Puerto Rican descent
- Kiele Sanchez – American actress; of Puerto Rican and French descent
- Marcelino Sánchez (1957–1986) – Puerto Rican film and television actor
- Saundra Santiago – American actress; 1980s television series Miami Vice; of Cuban and Puerto Rican descent
- Ray Santiago – American actor
- Renoly Santiago – Puerto Rican-born and raised in Union City, New Jersey
- Ruben Santiago-Hudson – actor and playwright
- Jon Seda – American actor; Puerto Rican parents
- Josh Segarra (1986- ) American actor of Puerto Rican descent (The Electric Company, Sirens, and Arrow)
- Liamani Segura (2008- ) American actress and singer of Puerto Rican and Salvadoran ancestry
- Gregory Sierra (1937–2021) – American actor of Puerto Rican descent
- Ebonie Smith – Puerto Rican-born American former child actress, The Jeffersons; of African American and Dominican descent
- Jimmy Smits – American actor; of Puerto Rican and Surinamese descent
- Talisa Soto – American actress; Canadian father of Puerto Rican descent, Italian mother
- Jeremy Suarez – American actor, film producer and director (The Bernie Mac Show)
- Rachel Ticotin – American film and television actress; of Jewish and Puerto Rican descent
- Benicio del Toro – Puerto Rican actor resident of Pennsylvania
- Liz Torres – actress, singer, and American comedian; of Puerto Rican descent
- Rose Troche (born 1964) – film and television director, television producer, and screenwriter; Go Fish; Six Feet Under, The L Word; of Puerto Rican descent
- Alanna Ubach – American actress; of Puerto Rican and Mexican descent
- Denise Vasi – American actress and model of Puerto Rican, Dominican and Greek descent.
- Nadine Velazquez – American actress; of Puerto Rican descent
- Desiree Marie Velez – American actress
- Eddie Velez (The A-Team)
- Lauren Vélez – American actress, Dexter; of Puerto Rican descent
- Loraine Vélez – American actress; Puerto Rican parents; sister of Lauren Vélez
- Christina Vidal – American actress; of Puerto Rican parents
- Lisa Vidal – American actress; of Puerto Rican descent
- Holly Woodlawn – Puerto Rican-born transgender actress and former Warhol superstar
- David Zayas – American theatrical, film, and television actor, Dexter; Puerto Rican born and American raised

== Directors, producer and screenwriters of films, theater and TV ==
- Miguel Arteta – Puerto Rican film and television director; film The Good Girl; television series Six Feet Under
- Giannina Braschi – author of experimental theater including United States of Banana
- Ivonne Belén – Puerto Rican documentary film director and producer
- Richard Peña – American film festival organizer, New York Film Festival; professor of film studies at Columbia University
- Tony Taccone – American theater director; of Italian and a Puerto Rican descent
- Joseph Vasquez (1962–1995) – American independent filmmaker
- Fernando Allende – singer, actor, painter, film producer, and film director

== Singers and musicians ==
=== Alphabetized by surname ===
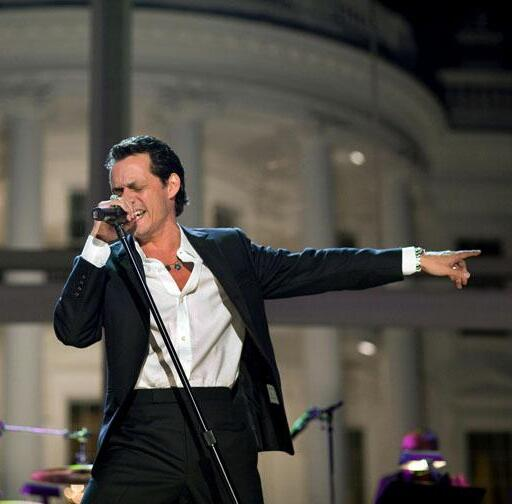
Marc Anthony, singer

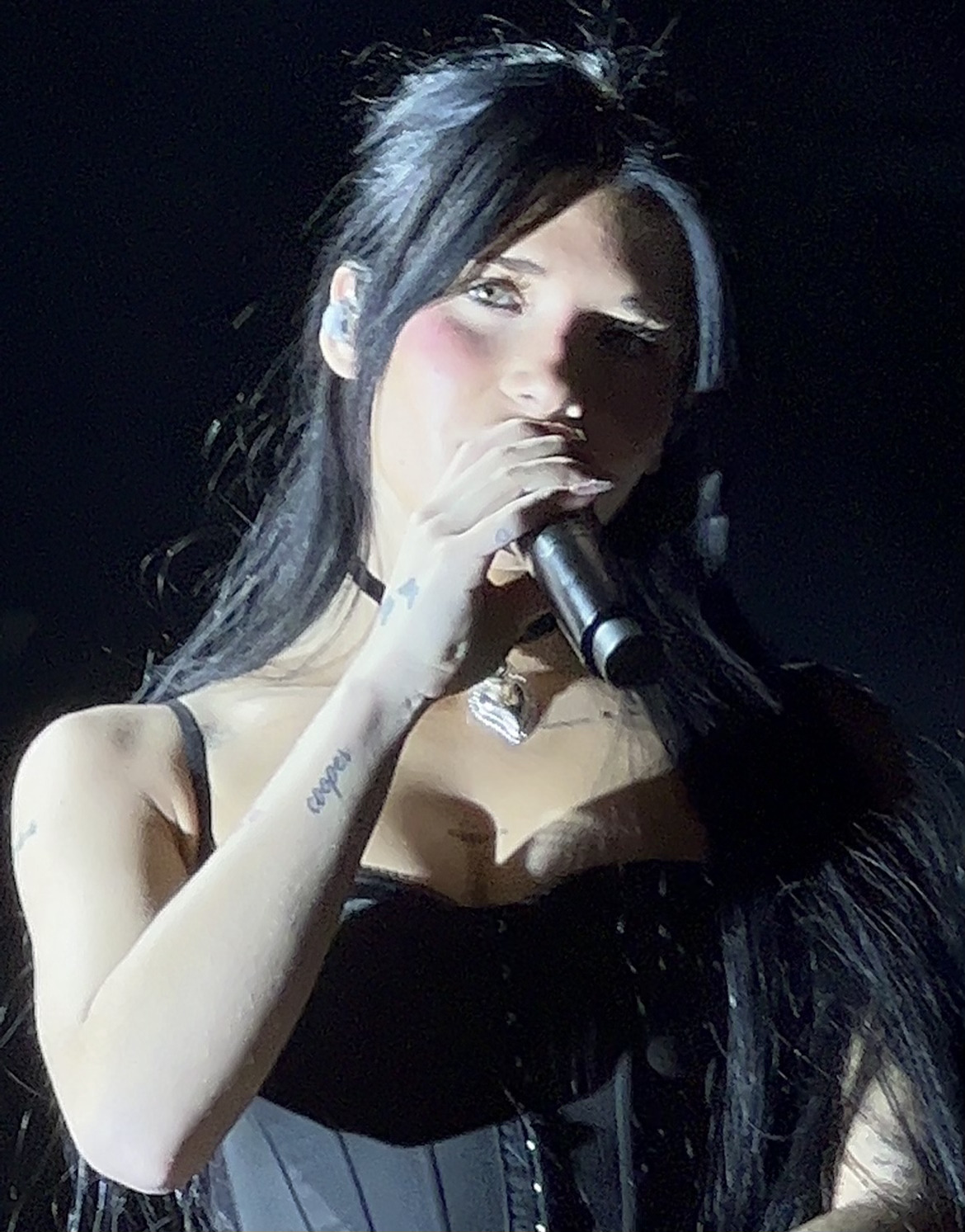
Nessa Barrett

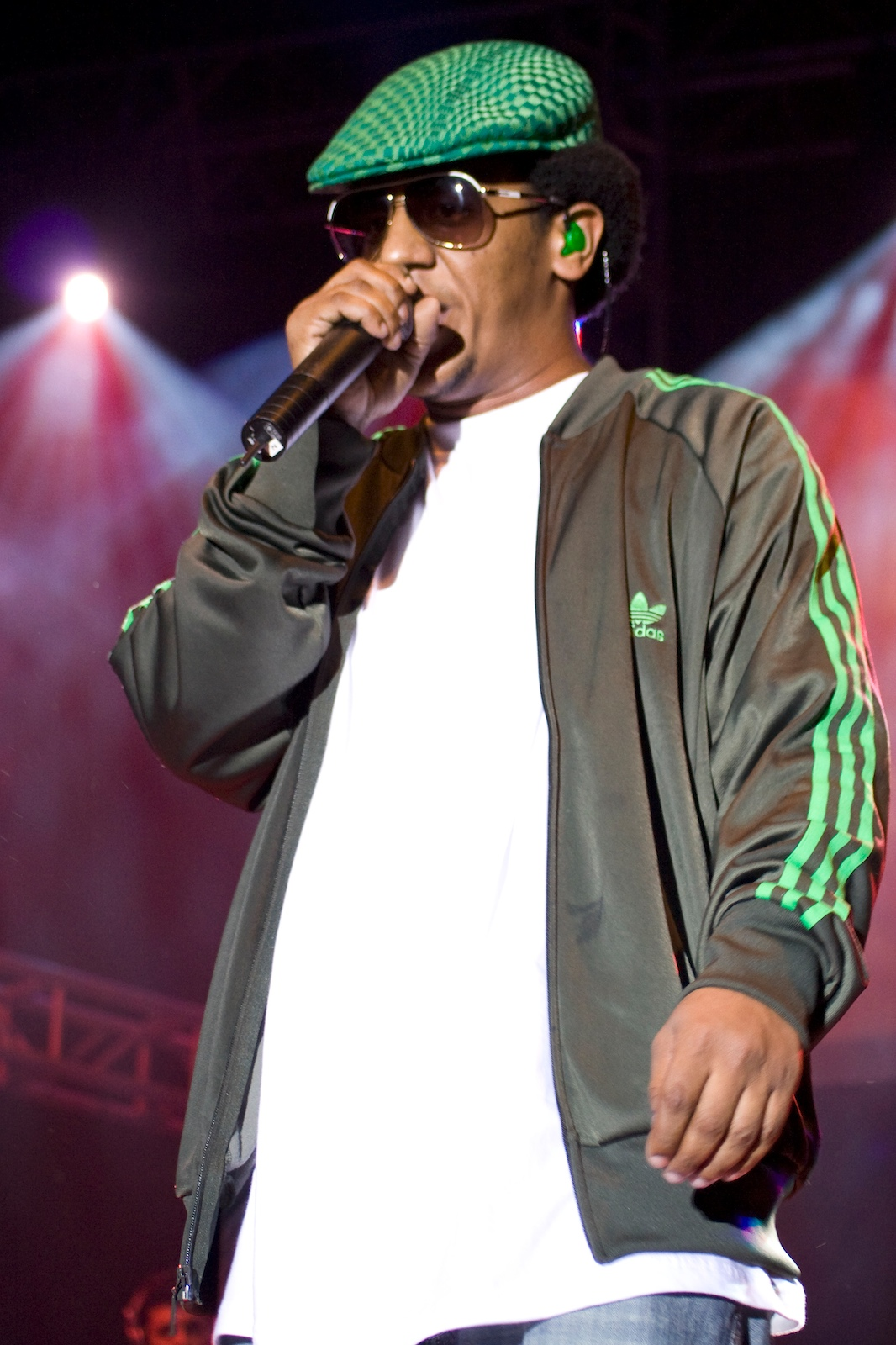
Tego Calderón

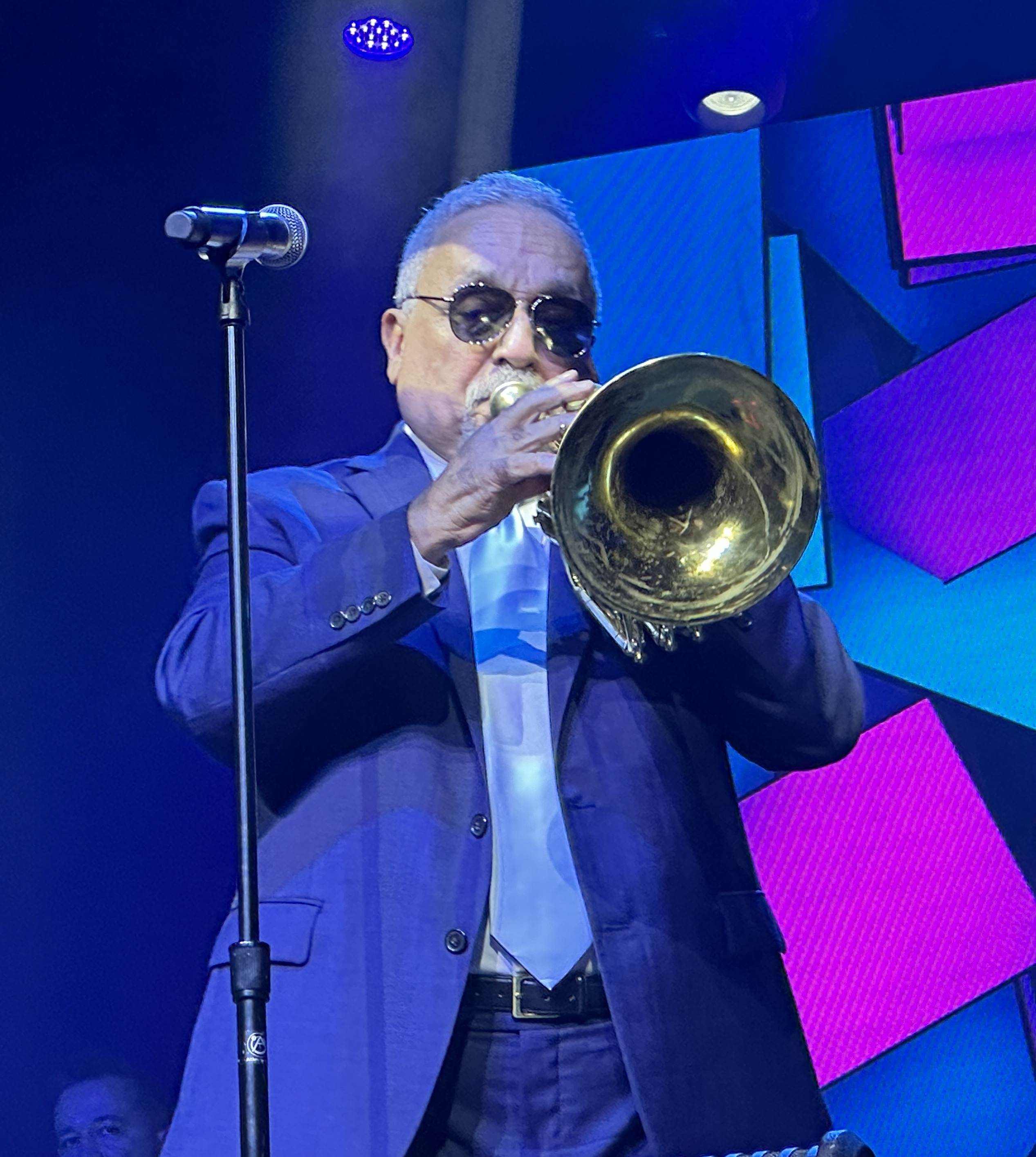
Willie Colón

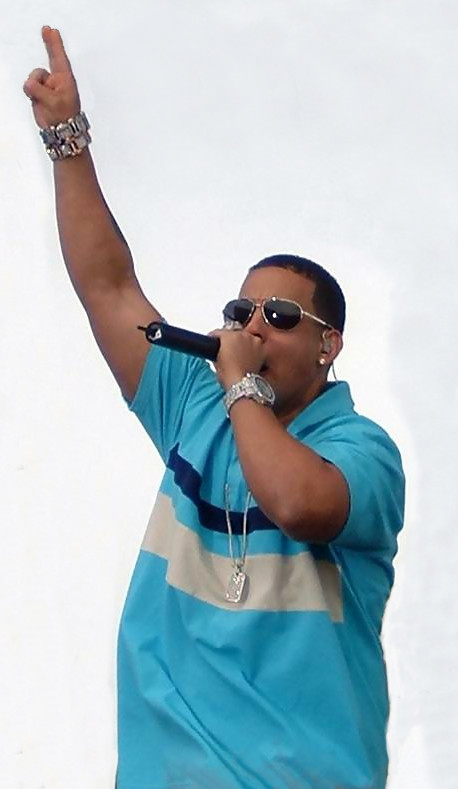
Daddy Yankee

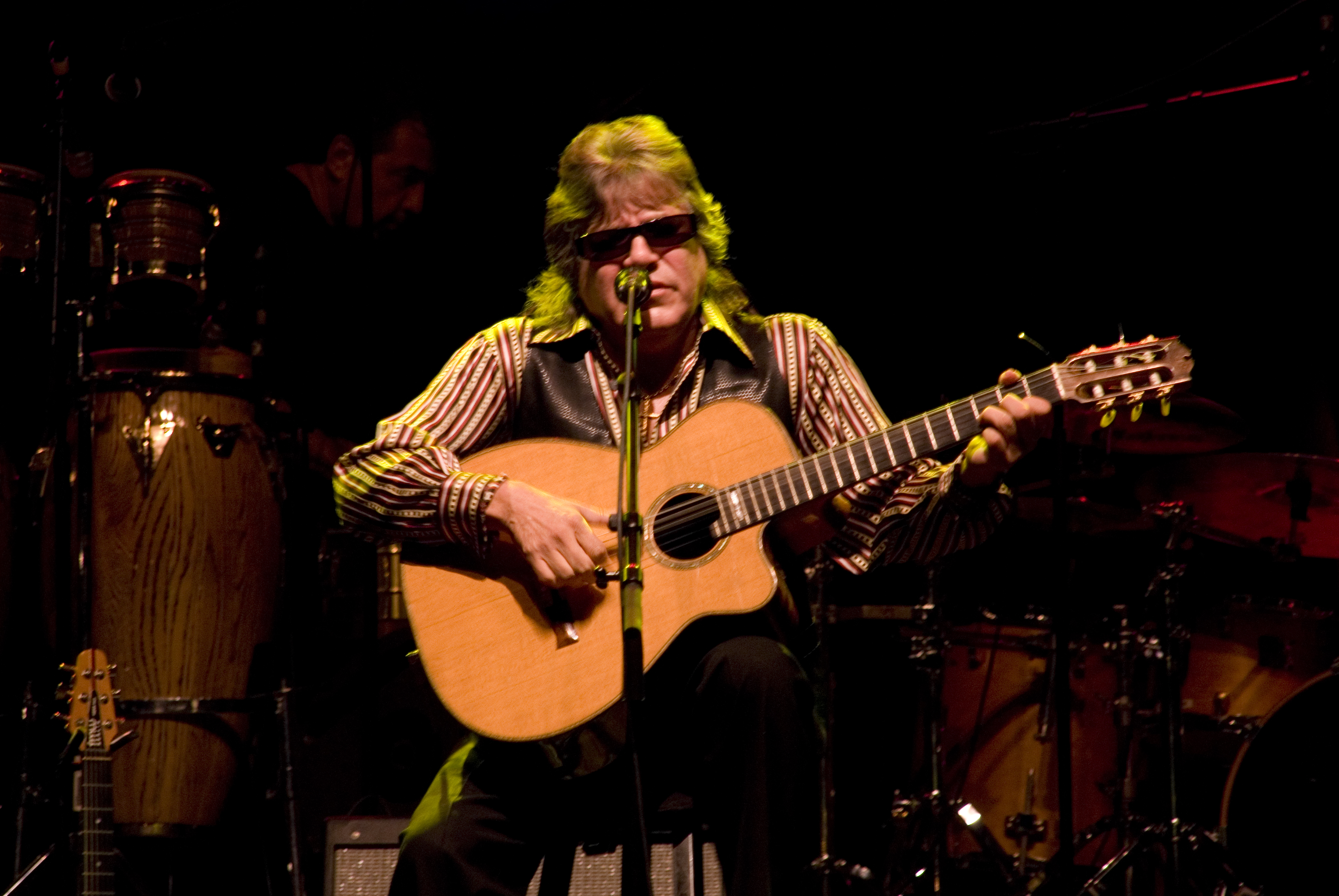
José Feliciano

- 6ix9ine – American rapper of Mexican and Puerto Rican descent
- Princess Nokia – American rapper of Puerto Rican descent
- Agallah, aka "8-Off the Assassin" or "Don Bishop" – Puerto Rican and Filipino-American rapper; former member of The Diplomats-affiliated group Purple City and the group Propain Campaign
- Johnny Albino (1919–2011) – Puerto Rican bolero singer
- Fernando Allende (Mexican/Puerto Rican) – With more than 100 songs recorded in 16 different projects in English and Spanish and having been the songwriter of many of these songs Fernando Allende is an icon named the ambassador to the mariachis for perpetuity in Mexico by its government.
- Tite Curet Alonso (1926–2003) – composer of over 2,000 salsa songs
- Melanie Amaro – American-born British Virgin Islands singer; won the first season of The X Factor USA in 2011
- Marc Anthony – American singer of Puerto Ricans parents
- Chucho Avellanet – Puerto Rican singer of ballads and pop music; son of Adolfo Avellanet
- Manolo Badrena – Puerto Rican percussionist, known for his work with Weather Report from 1976 to 1977
- Adrienne Bailon – American singer and actress; Puerto Rican mother, Ecuadorian father
- Lloyd Banks – American rapper, member of G-Unit; of Puerto Rican and African American descent
- Ray Barretto (1929–2006) – Puerto Rican jazz musician
- Nessa Barrett – American singer of Puerto Rican descent
- Samuel Beníquez – Puerto Rican writer, composer, music producer, businessman, publicist, activist, and philanthropist
- Eddie Benitez – Puerto Rican guitarist
- John Benitez, better known as "Jellybean Benitez" – American drummer, guitarist, songwriter, DJ, remixer and music producer; of Puerto Rican descent
- Obie Bermúdez – Puerto Rican-American R&B and salsa singer and composer
- BIA – American rapper
- Big Pun (1971–2000) – American rapper; of Puerto Rican descent
- Angela Bofill – American R&B vocalist and songwriter; Cuban father, Puerto Rican mother
- Kid Buu – American rapper of Puerto Rican and Sicilian descent
- Tego Calderón – Puerto Rican rapper and actor
- Michael Camacho – half of the short-lived 80s dance-pop duo Sly Fox; born in Los Angeles, of Puerto Rican descent
- Bobby Capó (1922–1989) – internationally known singer and songwriter from Puerto Rico; usually combined ballads with classical music
- Irene Cara – American singer and actress; of Puerto Rican and Cuban descent
- Kevin Ceballo – singer of salsa music of Puerto Rican descent
- Chayanne – Puerto Rican singer; resident of Miami
- Chelo – Puerto Rican hip-hop and pop singer, based in Miami Beach, Florida
- CJ – American rapper

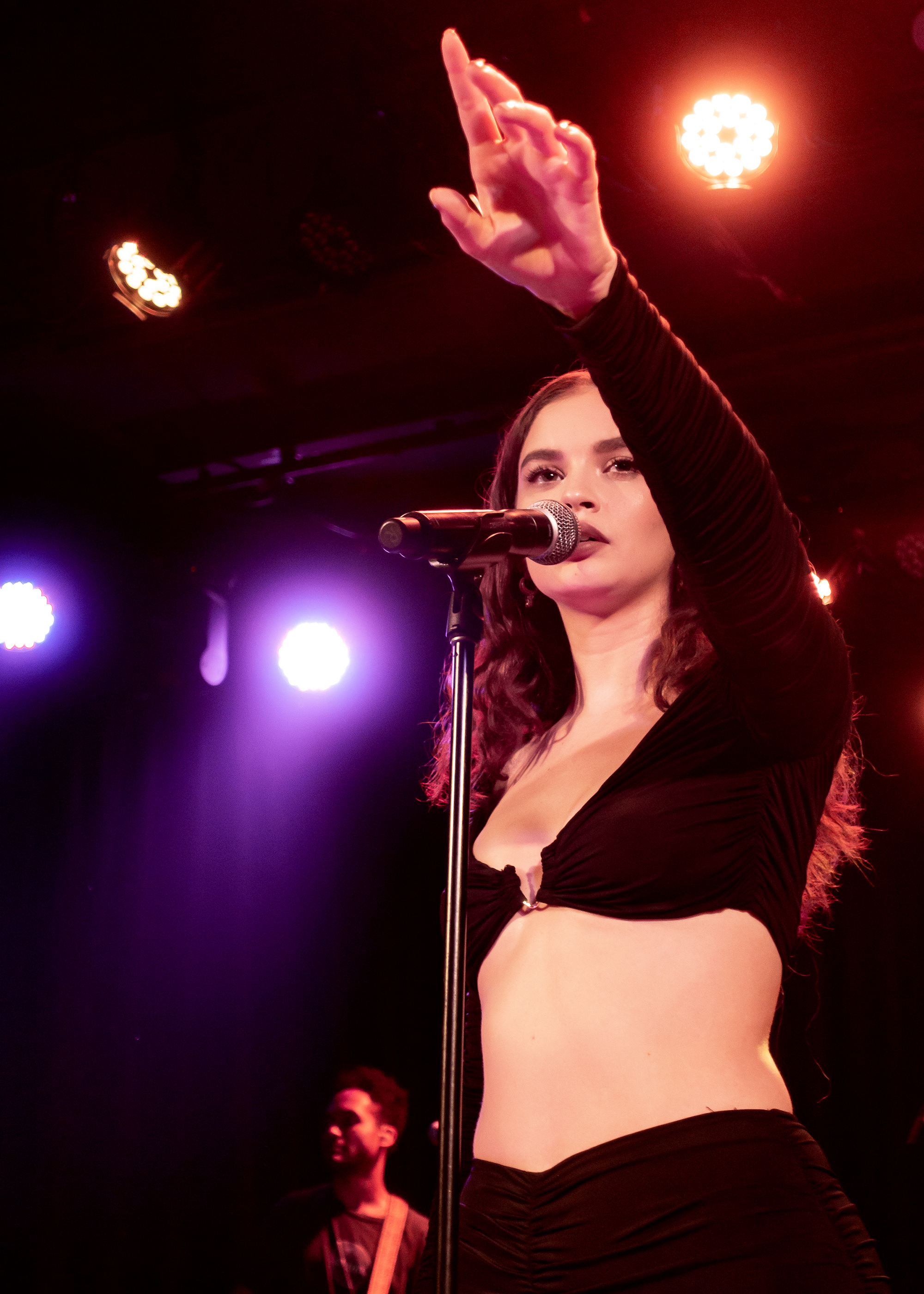
Sabrina Claudio

- Sabrina Claudio – singer
- Angel Clivillés – American singer founder and member of The Cover Girls
- Robert Clivillés – American singer, founder and member of C + C Music Factory
- Javier Colon – American singer and songwriter; of Dominican and Puerto Rican descent
- Willie Colón – Nuyorican salsa musician
- Federico A. Cordero – Puerto Rican guitarist of classical music
- Corina – American singer
- Eric "Bobo" Correa – of Cypress Hill, Cultura Londres Proyecto and Sol Invicto
- Elvis Crespo – Puerto Rican singer; born in New York City; Puerto Rican parents; raised in Puerto Rico
- Joe Cuba (1931–2009) – Nuyorican musician; considered the "father of Latin Boogaloo"
- Daddy Yankee – Puerto Rican singer of reggaeton
- Prince Markie Dee – American rapper, songwriter, producer, and radio personality; member of the Fat Boys; of Puerto Rican descent
- Carmen Delia Dipiní – Puerto Rican singer of boleros
- Iann Dior – American Rapper of Puerto Rican descent
- Diamond – American rapper of Puerto Rican and African-American descent from the rap group Crime Mob
- Howie Dorough – American musician; oldest member of the Backstreet Boys; Puerto Rican mother
- Huey Dunbar – American former singer of Dark Latin Groove; of Jamaican and Puerto Rican descent

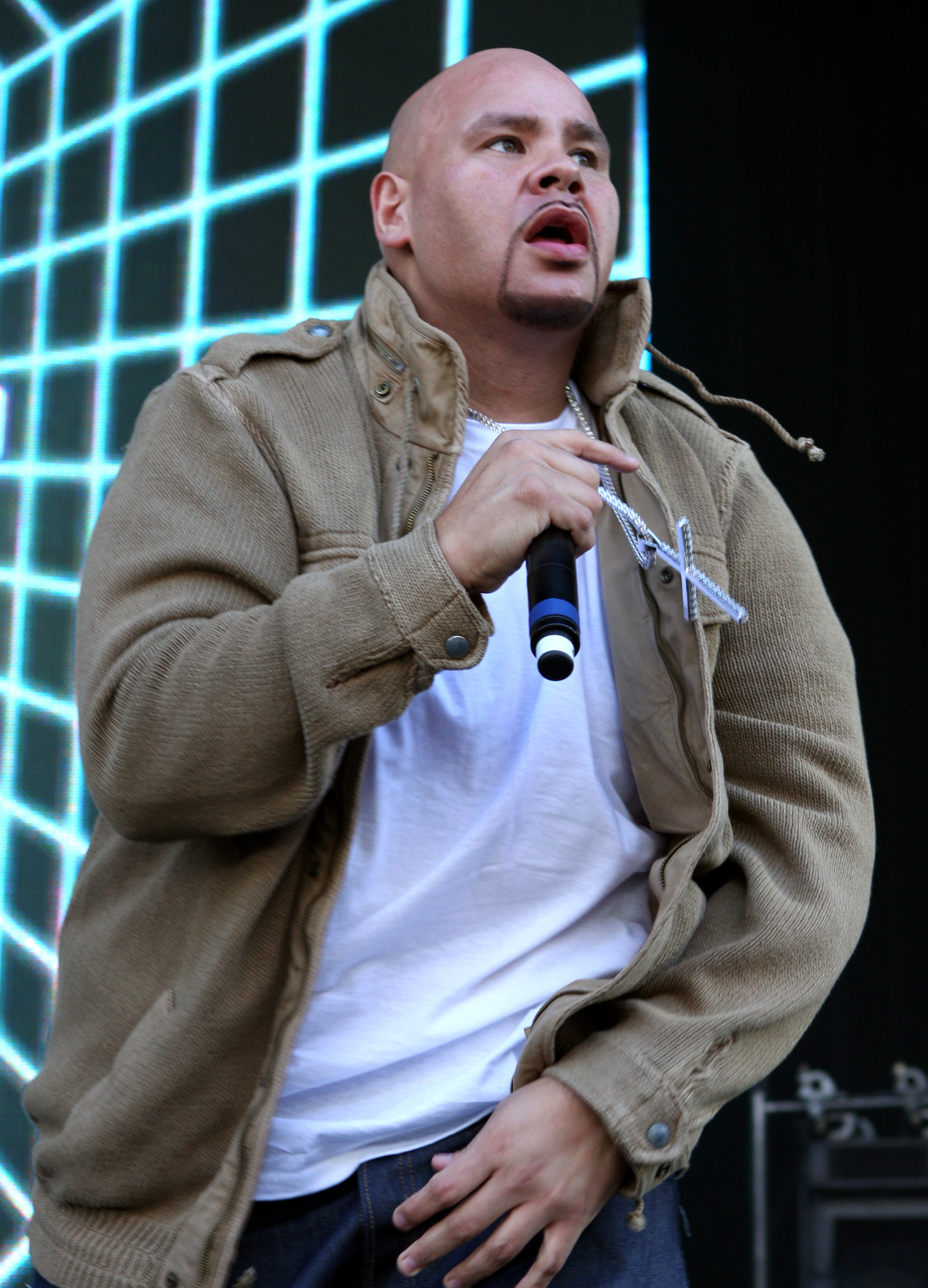
Fat Joe

- Fat Joe – American rapper; parents of Puerto Rican and Cuban descent
- Cheo Feliciano – Puerto Rican composer and singer of salsa and bolero music
- José Feliciano – Puerto Rican singer, virtuoso guitarist and composer known for many international hits; raised in New York
- Pedro Flores – Puerto Rican composer and bandleader
- Héctor Fonseca – house music DJ
- Luis Fonsi – Puerto Rican singer of pop-ballad and pop-rock; resident of Florida
- Angelo Garcia – member of Puerto Rican boy band Menudo from 1988 to 1990
- Mayte Garcia – dancer and American singer; of Puerto Rican ancestry
- Sergio George – pianist and American record producer, has worked with many famous performers of salsa music; parents are Puerto Rican
- Gisselle – American Merengue singer; Puerto Rican parents
- Jenilca Giusti – Puerto Rican singer-songwriter and actress; lived in Florida since age 8
- Kenny "Dope" Gonzalez – American dance musician
- Hex Hector – American dance remixer; of Puerto Rican and Cuban descent
- Joseline Hernandez – television personality and rapper from Love & Hip Hop
- Oscar Hernández – Puerto Rican musician
- Rafael Hernández – Puerto Rican composer, musician and bandleader; considered by many the greatest Puerto Rican composer of popular music
- Lee Holdridge – Haitian-born American composer and orchestrator; of Puerto Rican and American descent
- La India – Puerto Rican singer
- Nicky Jam – reggaeton singer; Dominican mother, Puerto Rican father
- Jim Jones – American rapper; of Puerto Rican and Aruban descent
- Alexis Jordan – American singer and actress; mother is of African American, American Indian, and European descent, father is Puerto Rican
- Big Daddy Kane – American rapper of Puerto Rican and African American descent
- Kako – -Puerto Rican musician
- Kelis – American musical artist; father is African-American, mother is of half Puerto Rican descent
- Tori Kelly – singer father is Puerto Rican and Jamaican descent
- Kurious – American hip hop artist; of Puerto Rican and Cuban descent
- George Lamond – American freestyle music singer, of Puerto Rican descent
- Héctor Lavoe (1946–1993) – Puerto Rican singer, resident of New York
- Manny Lehman – American house music DJ and producer
- Lil Suzy – half Italian, half Puerto Rican American Latin freestyle, pop- and dance-music singer
- Toby Love – Puerto Rican American singer-songwriter; Puerto Rican parents
- Lumidee – American singer-songwriter and rapper

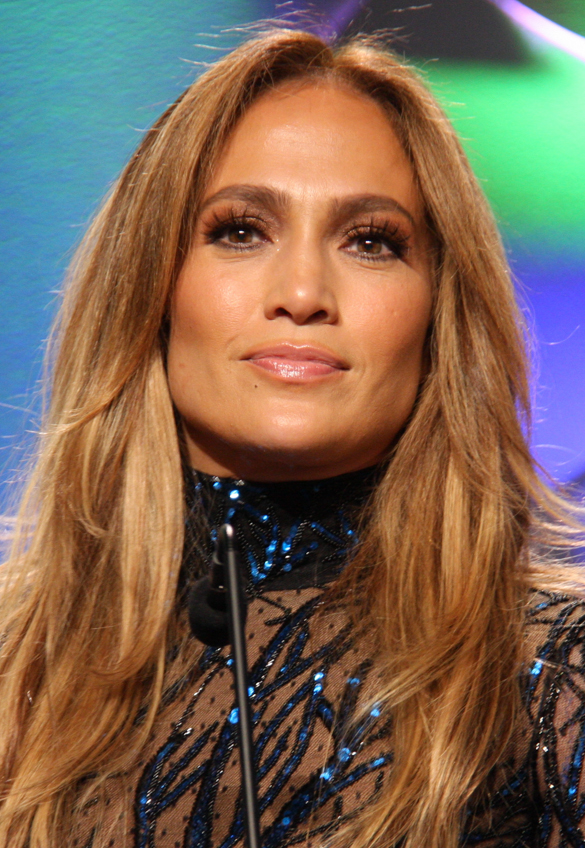
Jennifer Lopez

- Adrianne León – American singer-songwriter, chef, personal fitness trainer, model and actress; of Puerto Rican, Italian, and Canadian descent
- Lisa Lisa – part of the urban contemporary Cult Jam band
- Jennifer López – singer; Puerto Rican parents
- Víctor Manuelle – American salsa singer; of Puerto Rican descent

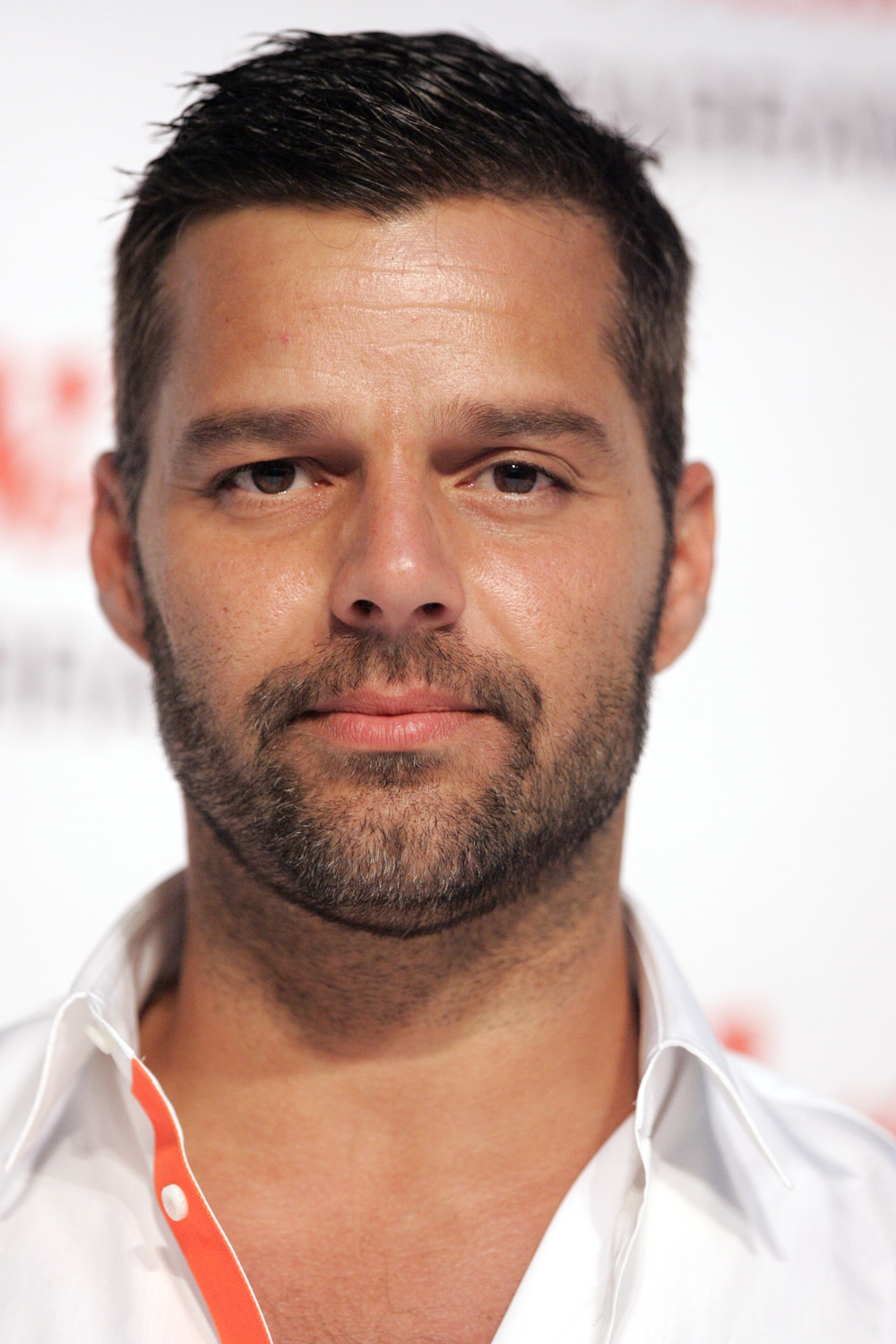
Ricky Martin, singer

- Bruno Mars – American singer-songwriter and record producer; parents of Puerto Rican and Filipino origin
- Ricky Martin – Puerto Rican resident of Los Angeles
- Angie Martínez – American radio personality, actress, and rapper
- Paul Masvidal – guitarist, singer, founding member of the progressive metal band Cynic; previously led the alternative rock band Æon Spoke
- Maxwell – American R&B, funk and neo soul musician; Puerto Rican father
- Scotty McCreery – American country singer; father is Puerto Rican of American and Puerto Rican descent
- Lisette Meléndez – American freestyle and Latin pop and dance-pop singer
- Syesha Mercado – American singer, songwriter, actress and model; of African-American and Puerto Rican descent
- Julia Migenes – American mezzo-soprano; of Greek, Irish and Puerto Rican descent
- Lin-Manuel Miranda – Puerto Rican-American composer and lyricist and actor
- David Morales – house music DJ and American producer
- Flor Morales Ramos – better known as Ramito, an important singer and composer of música jíbara
- Emcee N.I.C.E. – American rapper, songwriter and producer; lead vocalist and rapper of KansasCali & The Rocturnals; has appeared on 28 records since 2000, including Tupac's Thugz Mansion and soundtrack of the Oscar-winning film Crash; of Puerto Rican descent
- Rico Nasty – American rapper
- Chuck Negrón – American singer-songwriter; one of the three lead vocalists in the band Three Dog Night; Puerto Rican father, British mother
- Joe Negroni (1940–1978) – American rock and roll pioneer; founding member of the rock group Frankie Lymon and the Teenagers; a Nuyorican
- Tito Nieves – a leading salsa singer of the 1980s and early 1990s
- Asia Nitollano – American singer member of The Pussycat Dolls; She is half Mexican and Puerto Rican ancestry

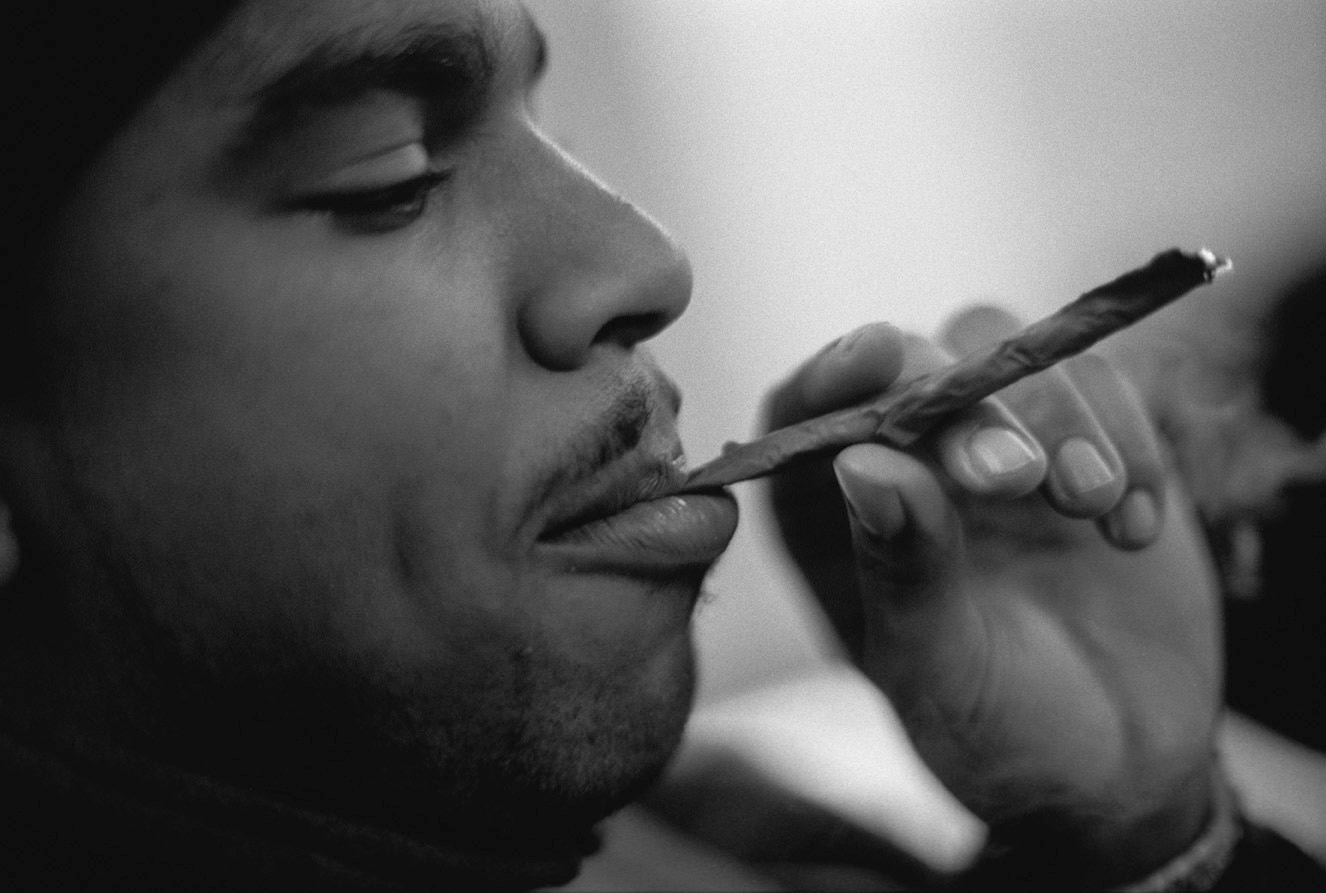
N.O.R.E.

- N.O.R.E – American hip hop recording artist; of Puerto Rican descent
- Colby O'Donis – American singer of Puerto Rican parent
- Don Omar – Puerto Rican reggaeton singer and rapper; resident of New Jersey
- Tony Orlando – American show business professional; lead singer of the group Tony Orlando and Dawn in the early 1970s; Greek father, Puerto Rican mother

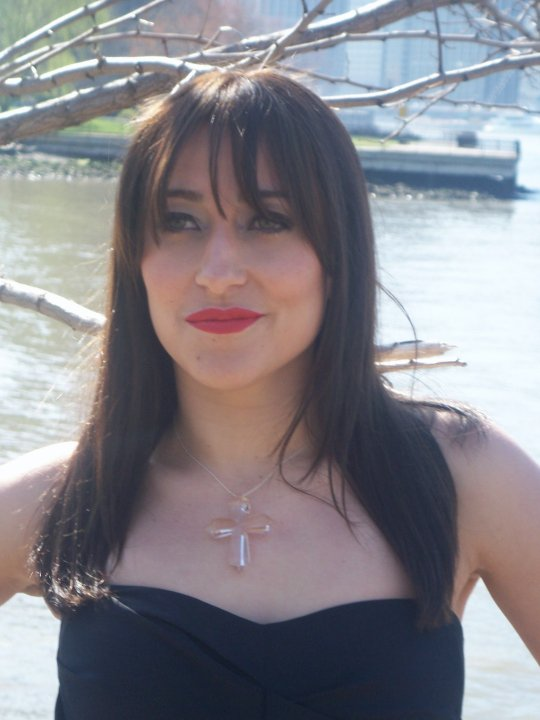
Jeannie Ortega

- Jeannie Ortega – American singer of Puerto Rican descent
- Claudette Ortiz – American singer and model, member of R&B group City High

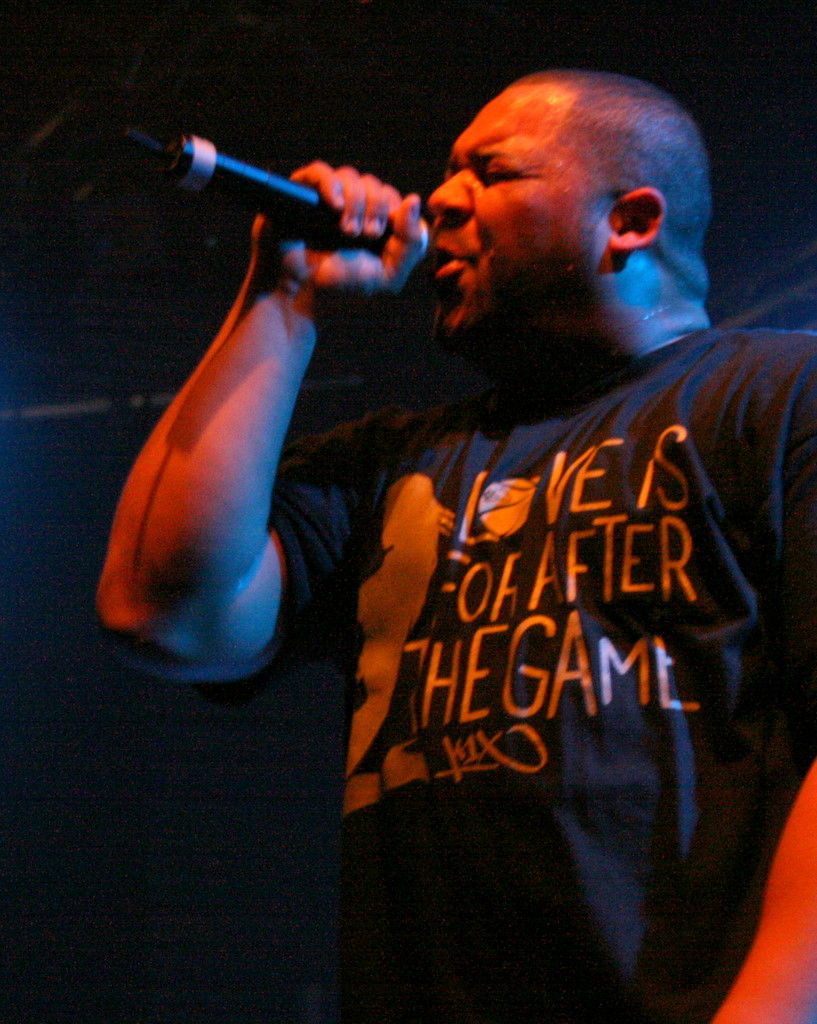
Joell Ortiz

- Joell Ortiz – American rapper
- Pedro Ortiz Dávila – better known as Davilita, Puerto Rican singer of boleros, danzas and patriotic songs
- Shalim Ortiz – Puerto Rican singer; resident of Miami
- Charlie Palmieri (1927–1988) – bandleader and musical director of salsa music
- Eddie Palmieri – American pianist, bandleader and musician; born in New York

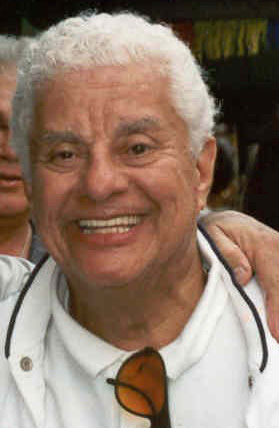
Tito Puente

- Carlos Ponce – Puerto Rican actor, singer, composer and television personality; lives in Miami
- Mikey Perfecto, American born reggaeton artist
- Miguel Poventud, aka "El Niño Prodigio de Guayama" and "Miguelito" (1942–1983) – Puerto Rican musician, singer, actor and composer of boleros; lived in New York
- Tito Puente (1923–2000) – Puerto Rican singer and musician
- Ivy Queen – Puerto Rican, reggaeton composer and singer
- Domingo Quiñones – American singer of salsa music
- Ismael Quintana – singer and American composer of salsa music
- Chamaco Ramírez (1941–1983) – Puerto Rican salsa singer and composer; died in New York
- Richie Ray – virtuoso pianist, singer, music arranger, composer and religious minister
- Ray Reyes – American born and Puerto Rican raised
- Ron Reyes – American musician; second singer for the group Black Flag; of Puerto Rican descent
- Gabriel Ríos – Puerto Rican pop singer
- Graciela Rivera (1921–2011) – first Puerto Rican to sing a lead role at the Metropolitan Opera in New York
- Maso Rivera – virtuoso cuatro player
- Mon Rivera – singer, composer and bandleader who specialized in plans; known as Mr. Trabalenguas
- Robb Rivera – drummer for heavy rock band Nonpoint; American born, father is Puerto Rican, lived on the island as a teenager. Father served in US Army in Korea and Vietnam
- Robbie Rivera – DJ producer
- Chino Rodríguez (born 1954) – music producer, band leader, musician, manager, booking agent, record company executive, business consultant, and American record label owner, specializing in Latin music, most notably salsa and Latin jazz; American-born, of Puerto Rican descent
- Daniel Rodríguez (tenor) – American operatic tenor from New York City
- Tito Rodríguez (1923–1973) – Puerto Rican singer and bandleader, known as "El inolvidable"
- Omar Rodríguez-López – Puerto Rican singer and musician lead guitar for At the Drive-In and Mars Volta

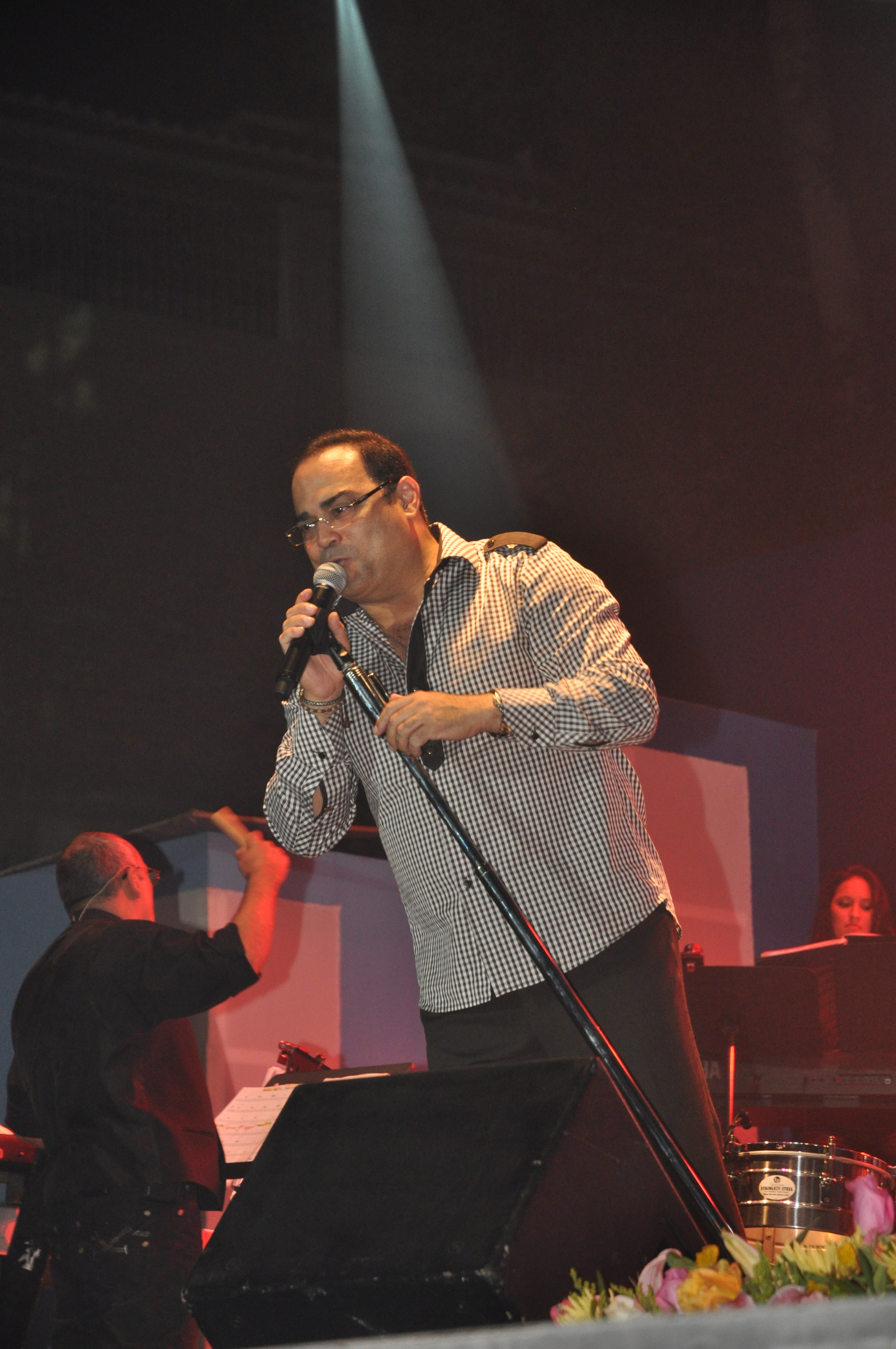
Gilberto Santa Rosa

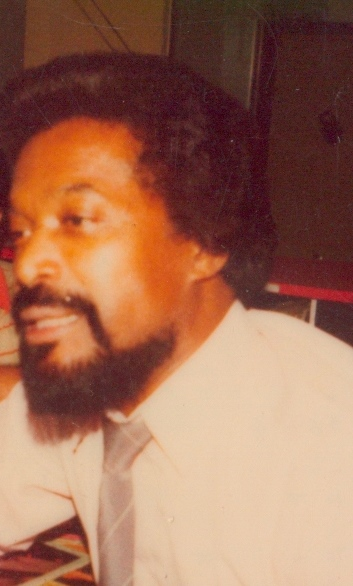
Pete "El Conde" Rodríguez

- Pete "El Conde" Rodríguez – Puerto Rican singer
- Draco Rosa – American musician, dancer, singer-songwriter, multi-instrumentalist, record producer and actor
- Willie Rosario – musician, composer and Puerto Rican bandleader of salsa music
- Felipe Rose (born 1954) – American founding member of disco group the Village People; mother is Puerto Rican, father is Native American
- Frankie Ruiz (1958–1998) – Puerto Rican salsa singer
- Hilton Ruiz (1952–2006) – Puerto Rican American jazz pianist in the Afro-Cuban jazz mold; resident of Teaneck, New Jersey
- Sa-Fire – American singer
- Jimmy Sabater, Sr. (1936–2012) – American Latin musician; parents were Puerto Rican
- Bobby Sanabria – American drummer, percussionist, composer, arranger, bandleader, educator, producer, and writer specializing in Latin jazz; of Puerto Rican descent
- Claudio Sánchez – American writer and musician
- Gilberto Santa Rosa – American salsa singer; of Puerto Rican descent
- Herman Santiago – rock and roll pioneer and songwriter; claimed to have written the iconic hit "Why Do Fools Fall In Love"; Puerto Rican born and Nuyorucan raised
- Daniel Santos (1916–1992) – Puerto Rican singer and composer of boleros and guarachas; died in Florida
- Ray Santos – American Latin Grammy award-winning musician
- Romeo Santos – American singer, featured composer and lead singer of the Bachata group Aventura; of Dominican and Puerto Rican descent
- Ray Sepúlveda – Puerto Rican American salsa singer
- Myrta Silva – Puerto Rican singer and composer of guarachas as well as television hostess and producer
- Brenda K. Starr – American singer-songwriter; Jewish American father, Puerto Rican mother
- Olga Tañon – Puerto Rican singer; resident of Orlando, Florida
- Juan Tizol (1900–1984) – Puerto Rican trombonist and composer
- Ray Toro – guitarist of My Chemical Romance
- Manoella Torres – "the woman who was born to sing"; American singer and actress; of Puerto Rican descent; resident of Mexico
- Tommy Torres – Puerto Rican producer, singer, and songwriter
- Tony Touch – American hip hop break dancer, rapper, DJ, producer and actor; of Puerto Rican descent
- Mario Vázquez – pop and R&B American singer; Puerto Rican parents
- Alan Vega – American vocalist
- Little Louie Vega – American musician; half of the Masters At Work musical production team
- Jamila Velazquez, American singer and actress of Dominican and Puerto Rican descent
- Veronica – American dance music singer and theatrical actress; parents were Puerto Rican
- Vico C – Puerto Rican rapper and reggaeton artist; considered one of the founding fathers of reggaeton; influential in the development of Latin American hip hop; American of Puerto Rican descent and raised in Puerto Rico
- Y-Love – American hip-hop artist; Ethiopian father, Puerto Rican mother
- Yomo – Puerto Rican reggaeton recording artist
- Kay Flock – American rapper of Puerto Rican and Dominican descent

=== Groups ===
- Hoax – alternative rock band, including Frantz N. Cesar of Haitian and Puerto Rican descent
- Kane & Abel – rap duo of twin brothers Daniel and David Garcia; of African American and Puerto Rican descent
- Nina Sky – twin sister singers; American of Puerto Rican parents
- Sweet Sensation – Puerto Rican female freestyle-dance music trio of New York
- TKA – Latin freestyle trio, prominent in the 1980s and early 1990s
- Wisin & Yandel – Puerto Rican group

== Models and dancers ==
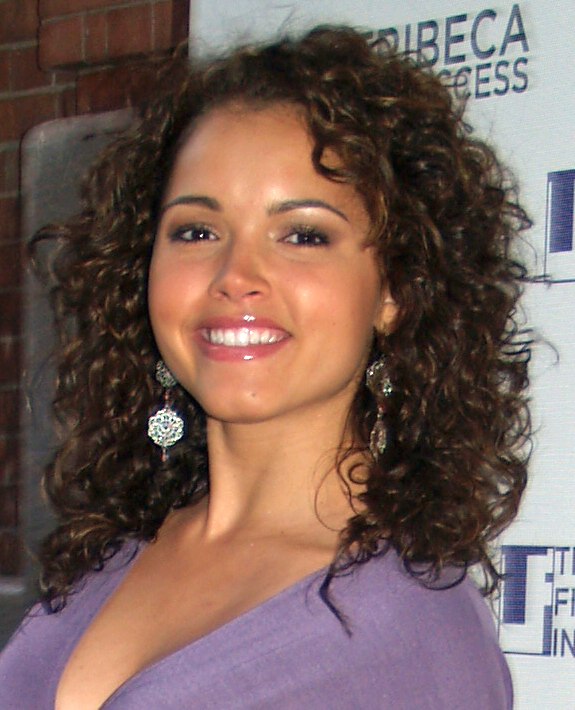
Susie Castillo

- Arthur Aviles – dancer and choreographer; of Puerto Rican descent
- Denise Bidot – plus-size model who is of Puerto Rican and Kuwaiti descent
- Crazy Legs – breakdancer, president of Rock Steady Crew
- Susie Castillo – former beauty queen; held the Miss USA title; competed in the Miss Teen USA and Miss Universe pageants; Dominican father, Puerto Rican mother
- Carmella DeCesare – American model; Playboy magazine's Miss April 2003 and Playmate of the Year 2004; of Italian and Puerto Rican descent
- Michelle Font – beauty queen; Miss Washington USA; competed in the 2008 Miss USA pageant; of Cuban and Puerto Rican descent
- Jaslene Gonzalez – Puerto Rican-American model, Puerto Rican born and American raised
- Melanie Iglesias – American model and actress; of Puerto Rican, Italian, and Filipino heritage
- Danielle Polanco – dancer and choreographer; Dominican-Puerto Rican American
- Pam Rodriguez – American glamour model; of Guatemalan and Puerto Rican descent
- Jock Soto – principal ballet dancer with the New York City Ballet
- Madison Anderson – born in the United States to an Anglo-American father and Puerto Rican mother. Model and Pageant Queen who placed First runner up at Miss Florida USA 2019 and later on represented Puerto Rico at Miss Universe 2019 and placed First runner up again

== Sports ==
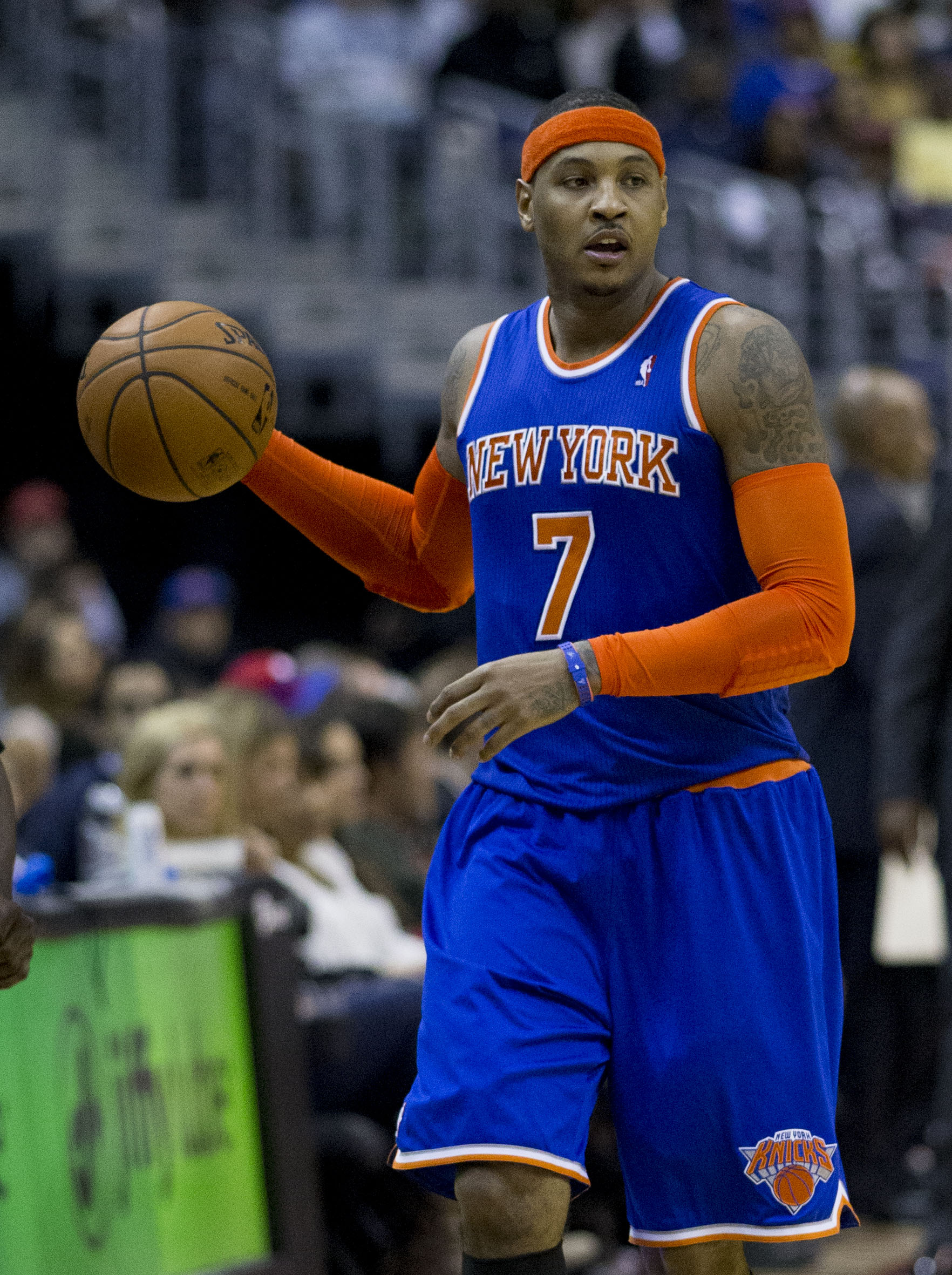
Carmelo Anthony

- AJ Lee – American professional wrestler
- Benjamin Agosto – American figure skater; Puerto Rican father, American mother of Romanian and Russian descent
- Eddie Alvarez – American mixed martial artist; of Puerto Rican and Irish descent
- Carmelo Anthony – NBA player of basketball; American of Puerto Rican and African American descent
- Nolan Arenado – American baseball player
- Carlos Arroyo – professional basketball point guard, last played for the Boston Celtics
- Harry Arroyo – American former boxer
- Mike Avilés – American baseball player
- J. J. Barea – NBA player; Puerto Rican resident of Miami
- Wilfred Benítez – American boxer
- Carlos Cortes – American baseball player
- Caitlin Cosme – Puerto Rican soccer player
- Héctor Camacho – Puerto Rican professional boxer
- Héctor Camacho, Jr. – Puerto Rican boxer and son of Héctor
- Eddie Casiano – basketball player; American born and Puerto Rican raised; of Puerto Rican descent
- Orlando Cepeda – Puerto Rican born, American raised
- Julie Chu – American Olympic ice hockey player; plays forward on the US women's ice hockey team; Chinese and Puerto Rican
- Roberto Clemente (1934–1972) – Puerto Rican Major League Baseball right fielder; Hall of Fame
- Alex Cora – former infielder in Major League Baseball, currently general manager of the Boston Red Sox
- Victor Cruz – wide receiver in the NFL
- Gloria Douglas – Puerto Rican soccer player
- Nickolette Driesse – Puerto Rican soccer player
- Guillermo Diaz – Puerto Rican professional basketball player; NBA

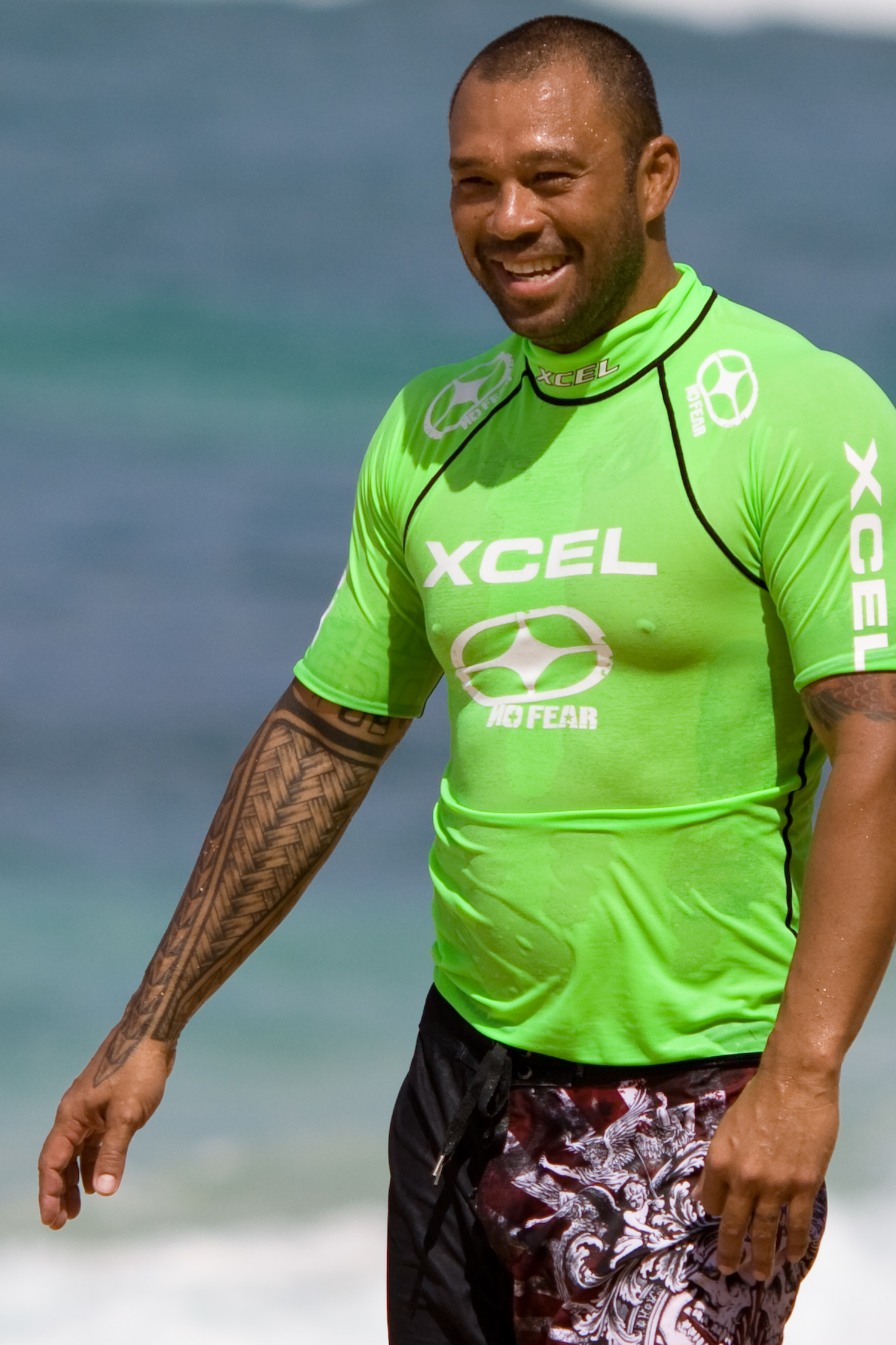
Sunny Garcia

- Nelson Erazo – American professional wrestler, better known by his ring name "Homicide"; of Puerto Rican descent
- Justin Fargas – American football running back; free agent in the NFL; son of Antonio Fargas
- Nelson Figueroa – American baseball plater
- Rey Fuentes – American baseball player
- Rico Garcia – American baseball player
- Sunny Garcia – American professional surfer
- Ernie Gonzalez – American professional golfer of Puerto Rican and Mexican descent.
- Dom Hamel – American baseball player
- Herbert Lewis Hardwick, aka "Cocoa Kid" (1914–1966) – boxer, inducted into the International Boxing Hall of Fame in 2012; born in Puerto Rico; Puerto Rican mother, African American father
- James "Chico" Hernandez – American Sambo athlete; a seven-time member of the USA National Team
- Oscar Hernandez – musician, musical arranger and American producer; of Puerto Rican descent
- Shawn Hernandez – American professional wrestler, better known by his ring names "Hotstuff Hernandez" and "Hernandez"; of Mexican and Puerto Rican descent
- Tyler Herron – American baseball player
- Reggie Jackson – nicknamed "Mr. October" for his clutch hitting in the postseason with the New York Yankees; former American Major League Baseball right fielder; father was Martinez Jackson, half Puerto Rican
- Kevin Kesar – American professional wrestler better known by his ring names "Killer Kross" and "Karrion Kross"; of Central American and Puerto Rican descent
- Butch Lee – NBA player; born in Puerto Rico, raised in New York
- Francisco Lindor – Puerto Rican baseball player
- Sabrina Lozada-Cabbage – Olympic basketball player for Puerto Rico
- Michael Lowell – Puerto Rican Major League Baseball third baseman for the Boston Red Sox; Puerto Rican born, American raised
- Seth Lugo – American baseball player
- Anthony Maldonado – American baseball player
- Edgar Martínez – nicknamed "Gar" and "Papi"; former Major League Baseball third baseman and designated hitter

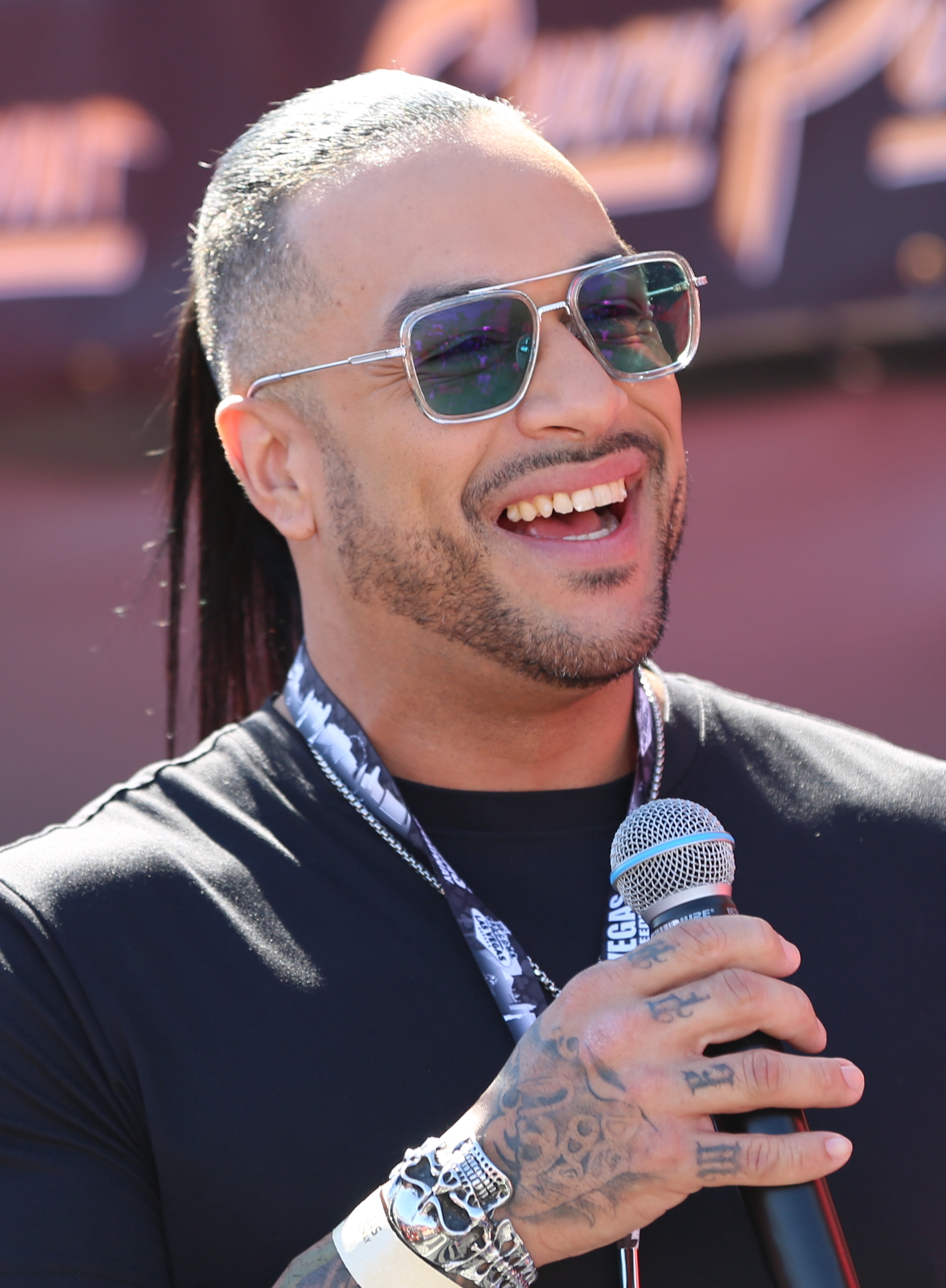
Damian Priest

- Damian Priest – American professional wrestler, born in the Puerto Rican Diaspora of New York, raised in Dorado, Puerto Rico
- Vanessa Martínez – Puerto Rican swimmer, represented Puerto Rico at the 2003 Pan American Games
- Denise Masino – American professional female bodybuilder from the U.S.
- MJ Melendez – American baseball player

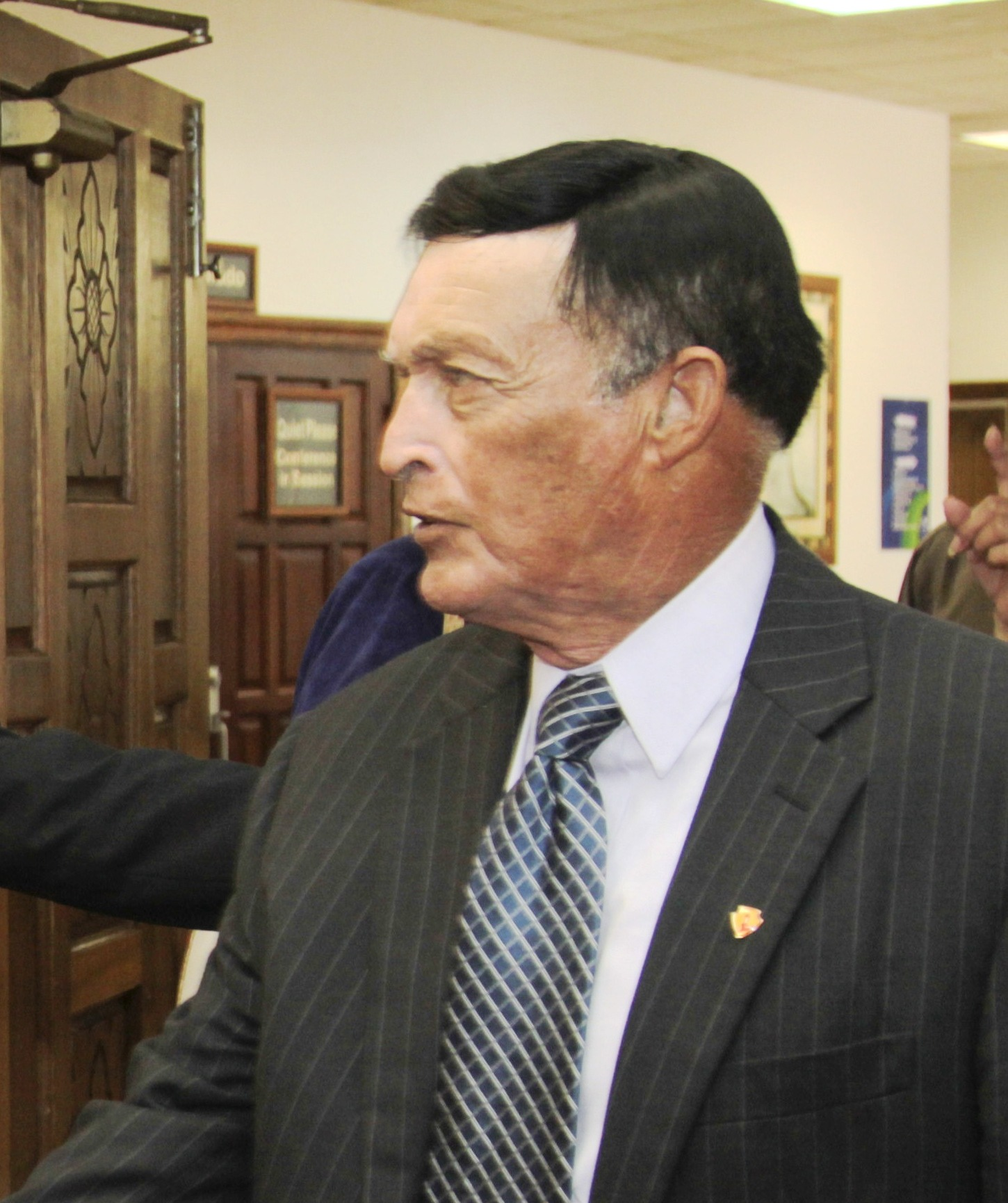
Chi Chi Rodriguez

- Ortiz – American professional wrestler known by his ring names "Angel Ortiz" and "Ortiz"; a Nuyorican; tag team partner of fellow Nuyorican professional wrestler Santana
- Carlos Ortiz – Puerto Rican three-time world boxing champion, twice in the lightweight division and once in the junior welterweights
- Nicholas Padilla – American baseball player
- Emilio Pagán – American baseball player
- Joshua Palacios – American baseball player
- Richie Palacios – American baseball player
- Sam Parrilla (1943–1994) – left fielder and pinch-hitter for the Philadelphia Phillies in 1970; played in the minor leagues 1963–1972; father of actress Lana Parrilla
- Travis Pastrana – American motorsports competitor and stunt performer
- Orlando Perez – American footballer of C.D. Chivas USA
- Roxanne Perez – American professional wrestler of Mexican and Puerto Rican descent
- Rico Ramos – American super bantamweight boxer and current WBA world super bantamweight champion
- Alex Ríos – American baseball player
- Edwin Rios – Puerto Rican baseball player for the Los Angeles Dodgers, World Series Champions of 2020.
- Ramón Rivas – Puerto Rican professional basketball player; born in New York, of Puerto Rican descent
- T.J. Rivera – American baseball player
- Jorge Rivera – American mixed martial artist; featured on The Ultimate Fighter 4; of Puerto Rican descent; born in Massachusetts; lived in Puerto Rico for a short time as a child
- Ron Rivera – American football player and head coach
- Chi Chi Rodriguez – Puerto Rican professional golfer
- Dereck Rodríguez – American baseball player
- Cristina Roque – Puerto Rican soccer player
- John Ruiz – former American professional boxer
- Mike Santana – American professional wrestler known by his ringnames "Mike Draztik" and "Santana"; a Nuyorican; tag team partner of fellow Nuyorican professional wrestler Ortiz
- Daniel Santiago – professional American basketball player; of Puerto Rican descent
- Hector Santiago – American baseball player
- Manny Santiago – Puerto Rican skateboarder
- Shakur Stevenson – American professional boxer of half-Puerto Rican descent
- Marcus Stroman – American baseball player
- JLo Varada – soccer player
- Thea Trinidad – American professional wrestler known by her ring names "Rosita" and "Zelina Vega"; of Puerto Rican descent; wife of Dutch professional wrestler Aleister Black
- Duane Underwood Jr. – American baseball player
- Idelys Vázquez – Puerto Rican soccer player
- Lisa Marie Varon – American professional wrestler, bodybuilder and fitness competitor; of Puerto Rican and Turkish descent

== Criminals ==
- Salvador Agrón, aka "The Capeman" (1943–1986) – Puerto Rican gang member who murdered two teenagers in a Hell's Kitchen park in 1959
- Ariel Castro – former school bus driver who kidnapped, raped, and tortured three women in Cleveland, Ohio and held them captive for a decade
- Raymond Márquez, aka "Spanish Raymond" – reputed American gangster; parents are from Puerto Rico
- José Padilla, aka Abdullah al-Muhajir or Muhajir Abdullah – American convicted of aiding terrorists

== Diplomats ==
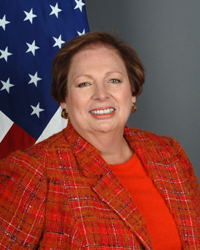
Mari Carmen Aponte

- Mari Carmen Aponte – US Ambassador to El Salvador
- Adrian A. Basora – American diplomat, and former US Ambassador to the Czech Republic
- César Benito Cabrera – former US Ambassador to Mauritius and the Seychelles
- Gabriel Guerra-Mondragón – US Ambassador to Chile 1994–1998
- Luis Guinot – former US Ambassador to Costa Rica
- Hans Hertell – former US Ambassador to the Dominican Republic
- Victor Marrero – former US Ambassador to the OAS
- Carmen Maria Martinez – former US Ambassador to Zambia
- Spencer Matthews King – former US Ambassador to Guyana
- Edward G. Miller, Jr. (1911–1968) – lawyer; Assistant Secretary of State for Inter-American Affairs 1949–1952
- Teodoro Moscoso – former US Ambassador to Venezuela and head of Alliance for Progress
- Horacio Rivero – Admiral (Ret.), former US Ambassador to Spain

== Educators ==
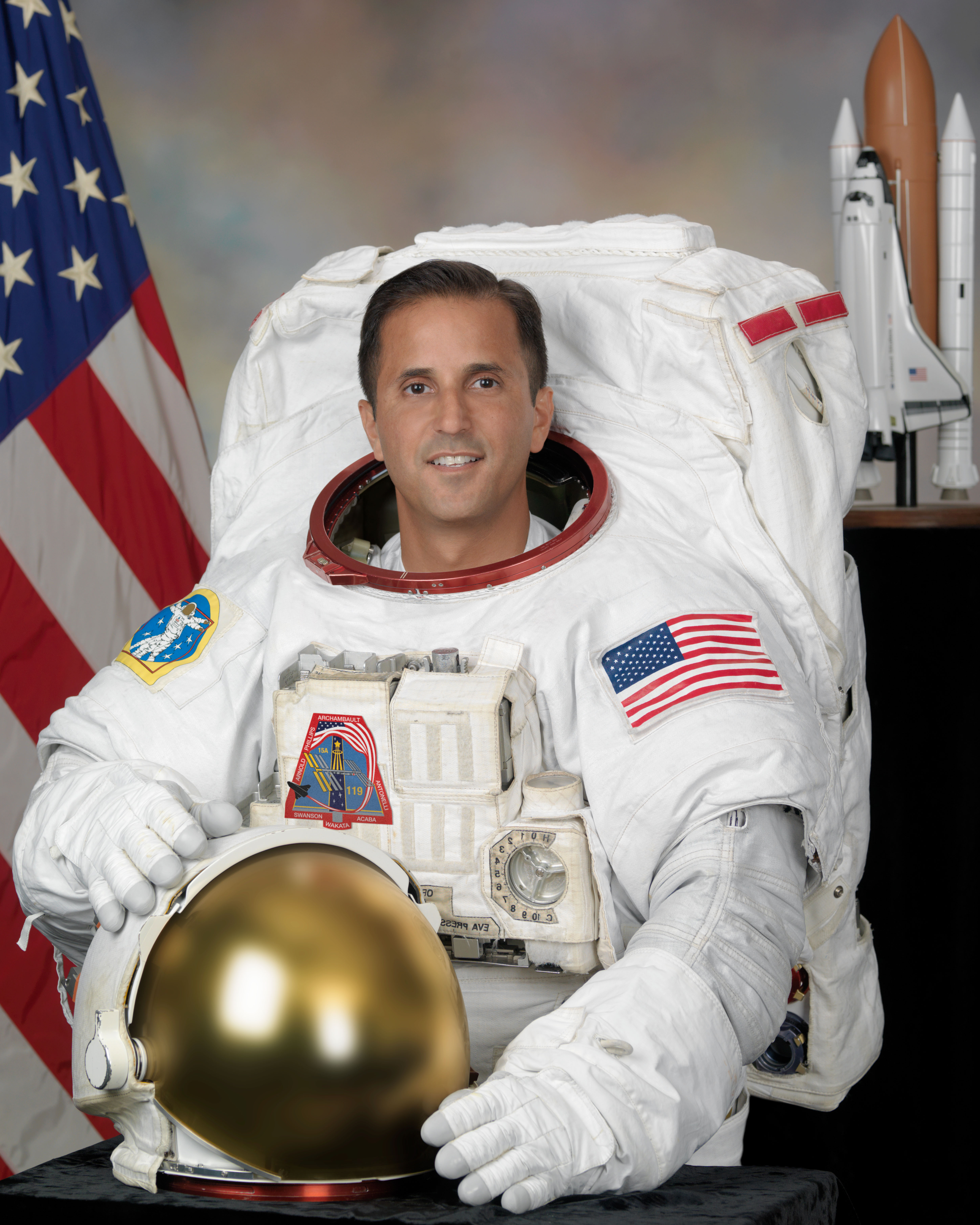
Joseph M. Acaba

- Joseph M. Acabá – educator, hydrogeologist, and NASA astronaut; American of Puerto Rican parent
- Edwin David Aponte – educator, author, religious leader, scholar of Latino religions and cultures; born in Connecticut to Puerto Rican parents
- Frank Bonilla (1925–2010) – American academic of Puerto Rican descent who became a leading figure in Puerto Rican Studies.
- Ramón E. López – American space physicist and author; played an instrumental role in the implementation of a hands-on science program in elementary and middle grades Montgomery County Public Schools in Maryland
- Andres Ramos Mattei (1940–1987) – Puerto Rican sugar industry historian; died in New Brunswick, New Jersey
- Carlos Albizu Miranda (1920–1984) – first Hispanic educator to have a North American University renamed in his honor; one of the first Hispanics to earn a Ph.D. in psychology in the US; Puerto Rican born and American raised
- Antonia Pantoja (1922–2002) – educator, social worker, feminist, civil rights leader; founder of ASPIRA, the Puerto Rican Forum, Boricua College and Producir
- Ángel Ramos – founder of the National Hispanic Council of the Deaf and Hard of Hearing; Superintendent of the Idaho School for the Deaf and the Blind; one of the few deaf people of Hispanic descent to earn a doctorate from Gallaudet University
- Carlos E. Santiago – Puerto Rican American labor economist; 7th chancellor of University of Wisconsin–Milwaukee
- Ninfa Segarra – last President of the New York City Board of Education

== Journalists ==
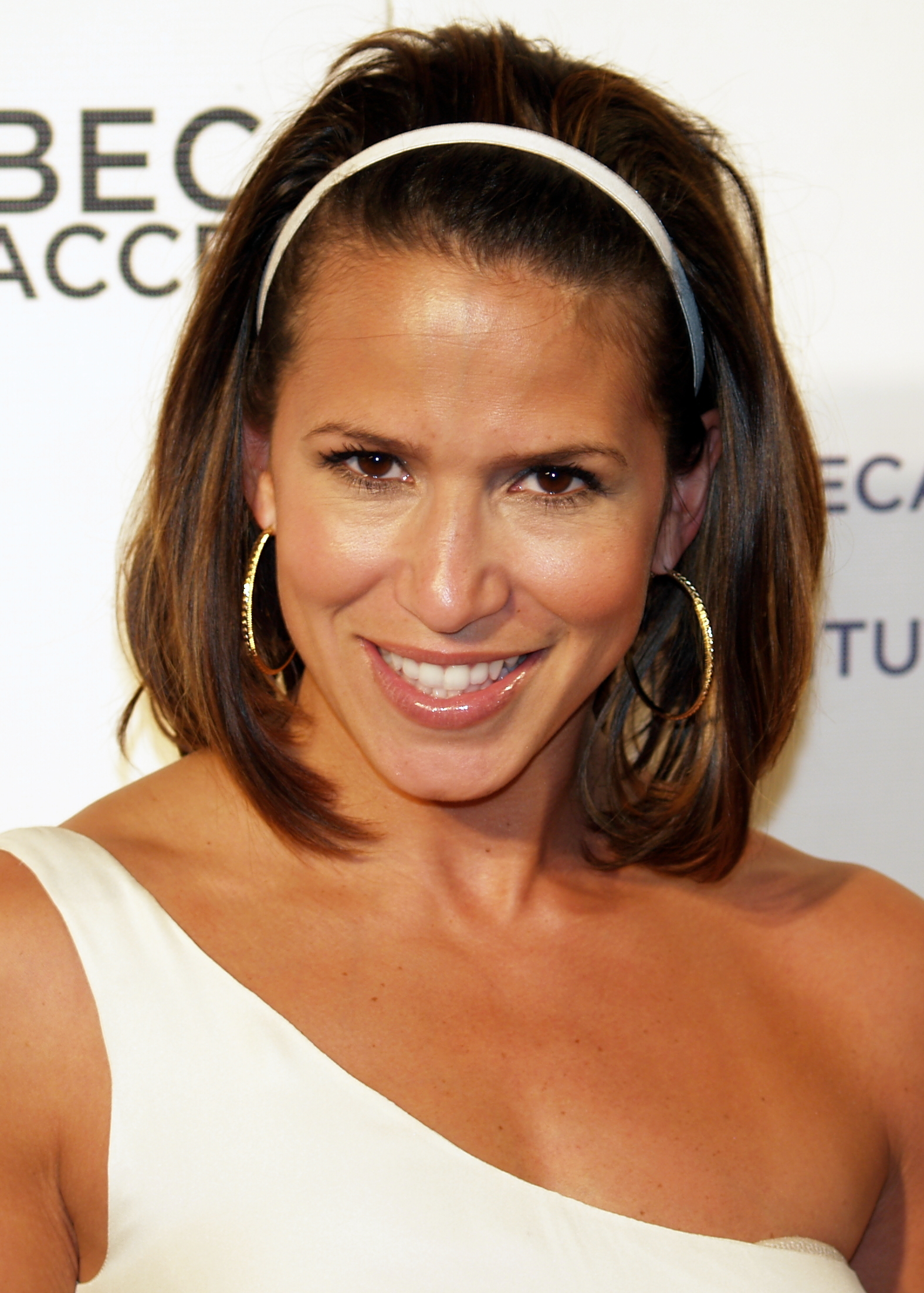
Marysol Castro

- María Celeste Arrarás – journalist and TV news presenter
- Lynda Baquero – American correspondent for WNBC news in New York City; of Puerto Rican ancestry
- Marysol Castro – American television journalist and weather anchor for The Early Show on CBS
- Carmen Dominicci – television journalist
- Jackie Guerrido – Puerto Rican television weather forecaster and journalist
- Juan Gonzalez – Puerto Rican born investigative journalist
- Kimberly Guilfoyle – American cable news personality; one of the rotating co-hosts on The Five on Fox News Channel; host of an Internet-only crime-related program for Fox News; Puerto Rican mother, Irish father
- Alycia Lane – American television journalist; of Puerto Rican and Welsh descent
- Lynda López – Emmy Award-winning Puerto Rican American journalist; youngest sister of actress and singer Jennifer Lopez
- Natalie Morales – television journalist
- Denisse Oller – Puerto Rican broadcaster, journalist, newspaper columnist; former cooking show host and news anchor at WXTV in New York City
- Audrey Puente – American meteorologist for WWOR-TV in New York City; daughter of Tito Puente
- Carlos D. Ramirez (1946–1999) – American publisher; purchased El Diario La Prensa, the oldest Spanish-language newspaper in the US

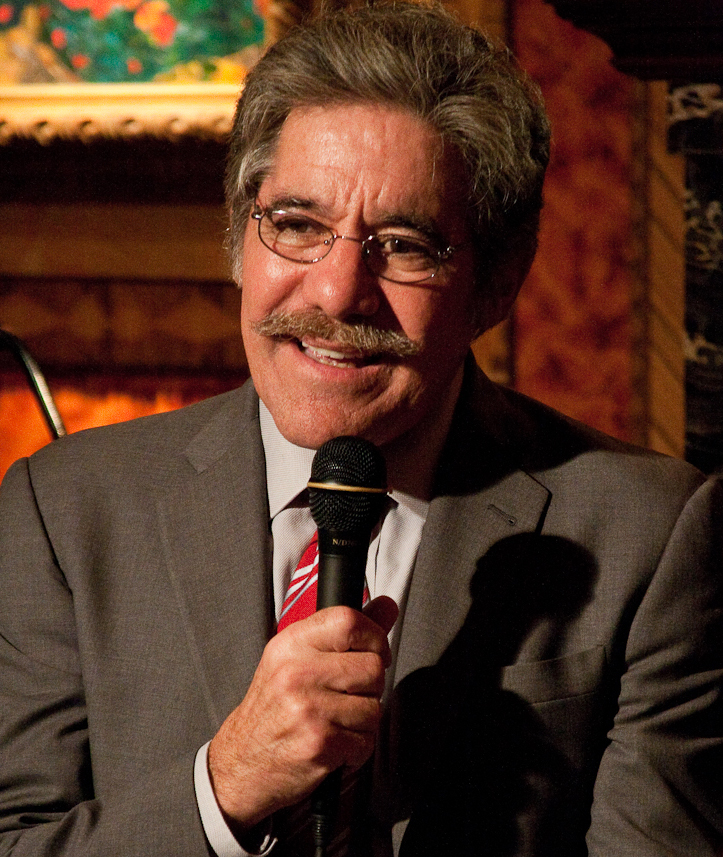
Geraldo Rivera

- Jorge L. Ramos – Puerto Rican announcer of Telemundo's New York City affiliate; moved to New York City in 1976
- Craig Rivera – American television journalist, producer, and correspondent for Fox News Channel; father was a Puerto Rican of Sephardic Jew descent
- Geraldo Rivera – American talk-show host, journalist; brother of Craig Rivera
- Darlene Rodriguez – American co-anchor of Today in New York; of Puerto Rican ancestry
- Edna Schmidt – American journalist; former news anchor for Noticiero Univision Edicion Nocturna
- Ray Suarez – television and radio journalist
- Elizabeth Vargas – television journalist; American of Puerto Rican descent
- Jane Velez-Mitchell – American award-winning television journalist and bestselling author; mother is Puerto Rican, father is Irish American

== Judges and law enforcement ==
- Jose Báez – criminal defense attorney; notable for his defense of accused child murderer Casey Anthony
- José A. Cabranes – judge on the U.S. Court of Appeals for the Second Circuit; formerly a practicing lawyer, government official, and law teacher; first Puerto Rican appointed to a federal judgeship in the continental US
- Albert Díaz – American judge on the U.S. Court of Appeals for the Fourth Circuit; parents are Puerto Rican

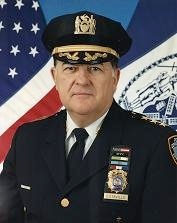
Nicholas Estavillo

- Nicholas Estavillo – first Puerto Rican and first Hispanic in the history of the NYPD to reach the three-star rank of Chief of Patrol
- Faith Evans – Hawaiian-Puerto Rican; first woman to be named U.S. Marshal
- Julio M. Fuentes – Circuit Judge on the U.S. Court of Appeals for the Third Circuit; first Hispanic judge to serve the Third Circuit; Puerto Rican born, American raised
- Juan Manuel García Passalacqua (1937–2010) – political commentator, lawyer; Puerto Rican, died in Ohio

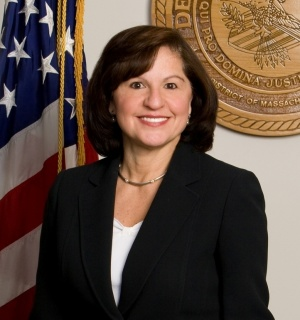
Carmen Ortiz

- Dora Irizarry – Puerto Rican federal judge in New York
- Irma Lozada – first female police officer to die in action in New York
- José Meléndez-Pérez – Puerto Rican-born U.S. Customs and Border Protection Inspector at Orlando International Airport who became a key figure for the 9/11 Commission when he refused entry to an alleged terrorist prior to the September 11, 2001 attacks
- Carmen Ortiz – prosecutor attorney, Boston, Massachusetts; American born
- Juan Pérez-Giménez – Puerto Rican born, U.S. federal judge in senior status
- Jaime Rios (judge) – judge on the New York Supreme Court.
- Roberto A. Rivera-Soto – Associate Justice of the New Jersey Supreme Court; American born, Puerto Rican raised
- Vanessa Ruiz – Puerto Rican associate Judge of the District of Columbia Court of Appeals, the highest court for the District of Columbia
- Benito Romano – first American of Puerto Rican heritage to hold the US Attorney's post in New York on an interim basis
- Joe Sánchez – American highly decorated former New York City police officer; author whose books give an insight as to the corruption within the department; parents are Puerto Rican
- Sonia Maria Sotomayor – Associate Justice of the Supreme Court of the U.S. since August 2009; the Court's 111th justice, its first Hispanic justice, and its third female justice
- Edgardo Ramos – United States District Judge of the United States District Court for the Southern District of New York since 2011.
- Edwin Torres – New York state supreme court judge and author; parents are Puerto Rican
- Juan R. Torruella – Puerto Rican jurist; currently a judge on the U.S. Court of Appeals for the First Circuit; first and to date only Hispanic to serve in that court

== Military ==
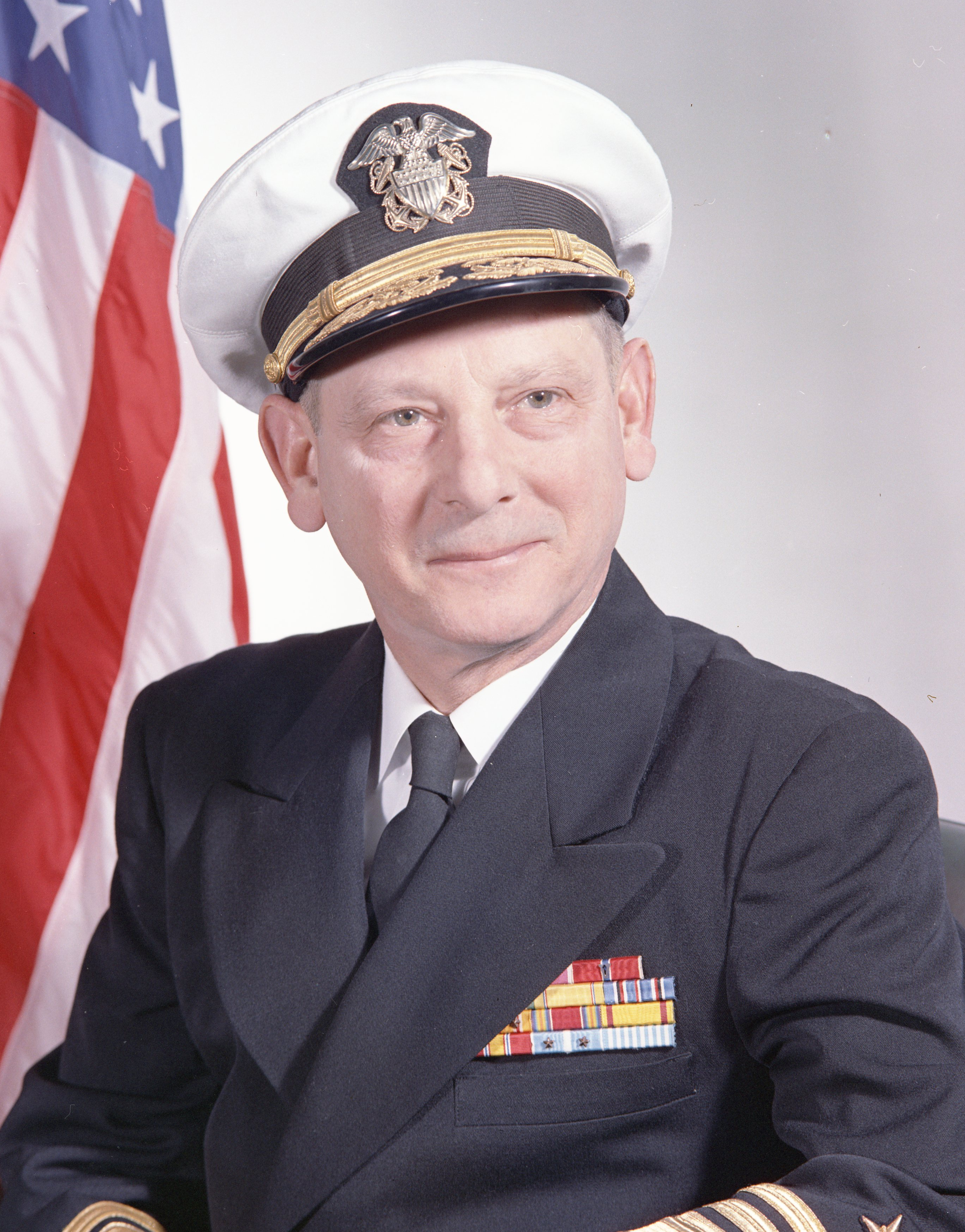
Horacio Rivero, Jr.

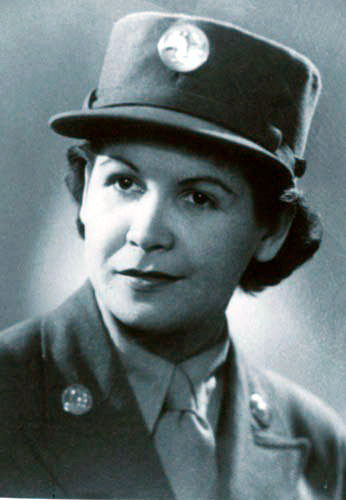
Carmen Contreras-Bozak

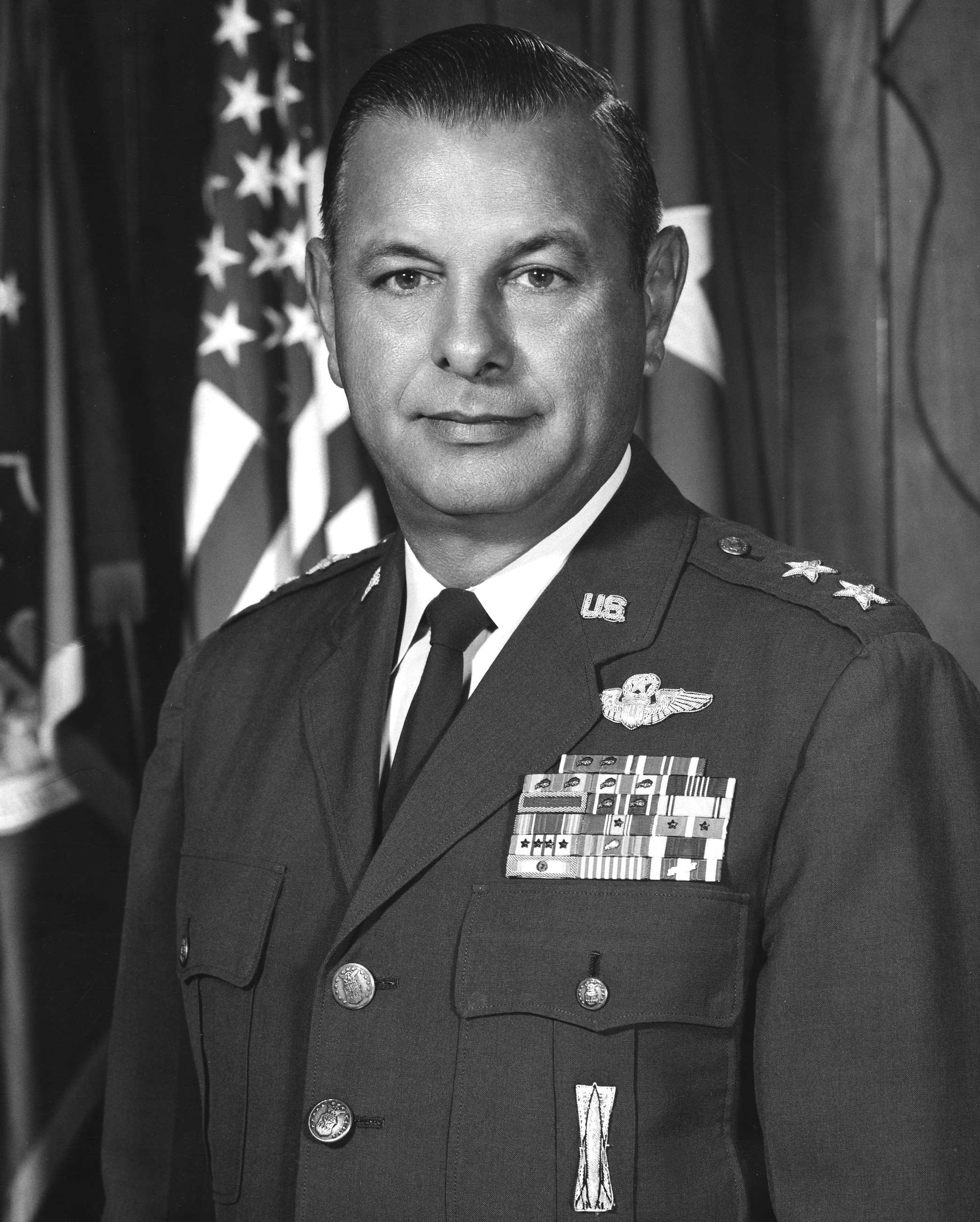
Salvador E. Felices

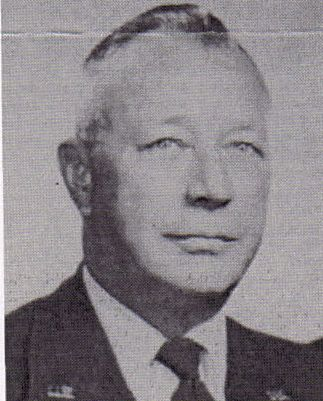
Virgil R. Miller

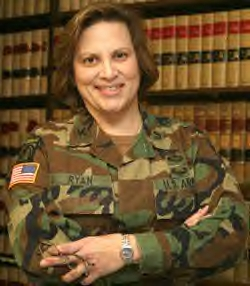
Maritza Sáenz Ryan

- Joseph B. Avilés (1897–1990) – served in the U.S. Navy and later in the Coast Guard; in 1925, became the first Hispanic Chief Petty Officer in the U.S. Coast Guard; Puerto Rican, lived in Maryland
- Rafael Celestino Benítez (1917–1999) – highly decorated submarine commander who led the rescue effort of the crew members of the USS Cochino during the Cold War
- José M. Cabanillas (1901–1979) – Puerto Rican executive Officer of the USS Texas, which participated in the invasions of North Africa and the Battle of Normandy (D-Day) during World War II; died in Virginia
- Iván Castro – U.S. Army officer who has continued serving on active duty in the Special Forces despite losing his eyesight; parents are Puerto Rican
- Richard Carmona – American physician and public health administrator
- Carmen Contreras-Bozak (born 1919) – first Hispanic to serve in the U.S. Women's Army Corps, where she served as an interpreter and in numerous administrative positions; Puerto Rican; lives in Tampa, Florida
- Linda García Cubero – former U.S. Air Force officer; of Mexican-American-Puerto Rican descent
- Rubén A. Cubero – highly decorated member of the U.S. Air Force; first Hispanic graduate of the US Air Force Academy to be named Dean of the Faculty of the academy; parents were Puerto Rican
- Alberto Díaz, Jr. – first Hispanic Director of the San Diego Naval District and Balboa Naval Hospital; Puerto Rican born and raised
- Rafael O'Ferrall – United States Army officer; first Hispanic of Puerto Rican descent to become the Deputy Commanding General for the Joint Task Force at Guantanamo Bay, Cuba
- Salvador E. Felices (1923–1987) – first Puerto Rican to reach the rank of major general (two-star) in the U.S. Air Force; died in Florida
- Diego E. Hernández – retired U.S. Navy officer; first Hispanic to be named Vice Commander, North American Aerospace Defense Command; Puerto Rican resident of Miami
- Lester Martínez López, MD, MPH (born 1955) – first Hispanic to head the Army Medical and Research Command at Fort Detrick, Maryland
- Carlos Lozada (1946–1967) – member of the U.S. Army; one of five Puerto Ricans who posthumously received the Medal of Honor for their actions in combat; Puerto Rican born, raised in New York City
- Ángel Méndez (1946–1967) – U.S. Marine, posthumously awarded the Navy Cross
- Virgil Rasmuss Miller (1900–1968) – U.S. Army officer who served as Regimental Commander of the 442d Regimental Combat Team, a unit composed of "Nisei" (second generation Americans of Japanese descent), during World War II
- Héctor Andrés Negroni – Puerto Rican historian, senior aerospace defense executive, author; first Puerto Rican graduate of the U.S. Air Force Academy; lives in Vienna, Virginia
- Antonia Novello – Puerto Rican physician and public health administrator; US Surgeon General
- María Inés Ortiz (1967–2007) – first American nurse to die in combat during Operation Iraqi Freedom; first Army nurse to die in combat since the Vietnam War; parents were Puerto Rican

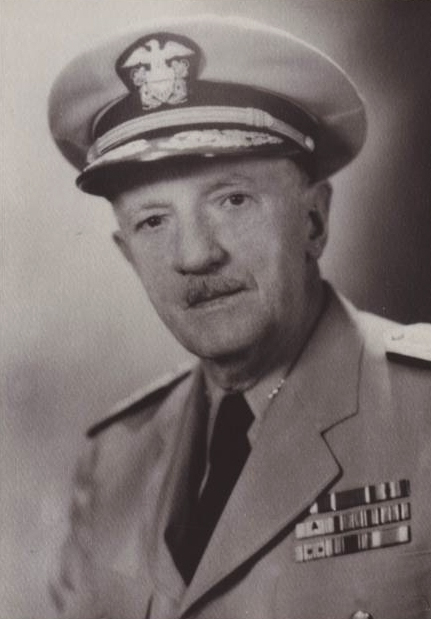
Rudolph W. Riefkohl

- Héctor E. Pagán – U.S. Army officer; first Hispanic of Puerto Rican descent to become Deputy Commanding General of the US Army John F. Kennedy Special Warfare Center and School at Fort Bragg, North Carolina
- José M. Portela – retired officer of the U.S. Air Force; served in the position of Assistant Adjutant General for Air while also serving as commander of the Puerto Rico Air National Guard
- Marion Frederic Ramírez de Arellano (1913–1980) – submarine commander in the US Navy; first Hispanic submarine commanding officer
- Frederick Lois Riefkohl (1889–1969) – Puerto Rican officer in the U.S. Navy; first Puerto Rican to graduate from the U.S. Naval Academy and to be awarded the Navy Cross; lived and died in Florida
- Rudolph W. Riefkohl (1885–1950) – U.S. Army officer; instrumental in helping the people of Poland overcome the 1919 typhus epidemic
- Pedro N. Rivera – retired Puerto Rican US Air Force officer; in 1994 became the first Hispanic medical commander in the Air Force; lives in Alexandria, Virginia
- Elmelindo Rodrigues Smith (1935–1967) – U.S. Army soldier posthumously awarded the Medal of Honor for his actions in the Vietnam War; of Puerto Rican descent
- Augusto Rodríguez – Puerto Rican officer in the Union Army during the American Civil War; immigrated to the US in the 1850s
- Pedro Rodríguez (1912–1999) – earned two Silver Stars within a seven-day period during the Korean War; Puerto Rican; died in Washington, D.C.
- Fernando E. Rodríguez Vargas (1888–1932) – Puerto Rican odontologist (dentist), scientist and a major in the US Army; discovered the bacteria which causes cavities; died in Washington, D.C.
- Maritza Sáenz Ryan – U.S. Army officer; head of the Department of Law at the US Military Academy; first woman and first Hispanic West Point graduate to serve as an academic department head; Puerto Rican father, Spanish mother
- Héctor Santiago-Colón (1942–1968) – one of five Puerto Ricans posthumously presented with the Medal of Honor, the highest military decoration awarded by the U.S.; Puerto Rican from New York
- Frances M. Vega (1983–2003) – first female soldier of Puerto Rican descent to die in a combat zone, in Operation Iraqi Freedom
- Pedro del Valle (1893–1978) – U.S. Marine Corps officer; first Hispanic to reach the rank of lieutenant general; in 1900 his family emigrated to the US and became US citizens
- Carmen Vazquez Rivera (born 1922) – First Lieutenant, U.S. Air Force. Vazquez was an early Puerto Rican female officer of the United States Army and Air Force who served in both World War II and the Korean War. Wife of Leopoldo Figueroa. Awarded the American Theater Campaign Medal, WWII Victory Medal, Overseas Service Bars (3), and National Defense Service Medal. Following her 100th birthday, Vazquez was awarded the League of United Latin American Citizens Presidential Medal of Freedom and honored by the United States Congress.
- Humbert Roque Versace (1937–1965) – American U.S. Army officer of Puerto Rican-Italian descent; awarded the US' highest military decoration, the Medal of Honor, for his heroic actions while a prisoner of war during the Vietnam War
- Ramón Colón-López (born 1971) – Fourth Senior Enlisted Advisor to the Chairman, the most senior enlisted airman in the United States Military, from Ponce, Puerto Rico. On June 13, 2007, Colón-López became the first Hispanic, and one of the first six airmen, to be awarded the newly created Air Force Combat Action Medal.

== Political ==
- Herman Badillo – Puerto Rican-born US Representative; first Puerto Rican elected to the US Congress
- Roberto Rexach Benítez – Puerto Rican politician; former Senator and Representative
- Mia Bonta – member of the California State Assembly from the 18th district
- Adolfo Carrión Jr. – Democratic politician; of Puerto Rican descent, from City Island, New York
- Ruth Noemí Colón – Puerto Rican; 66th Secretary of State of New York
- Pedro Cortés – Puerto Rican former Secretary of the Commonwealth of Pennsylvania

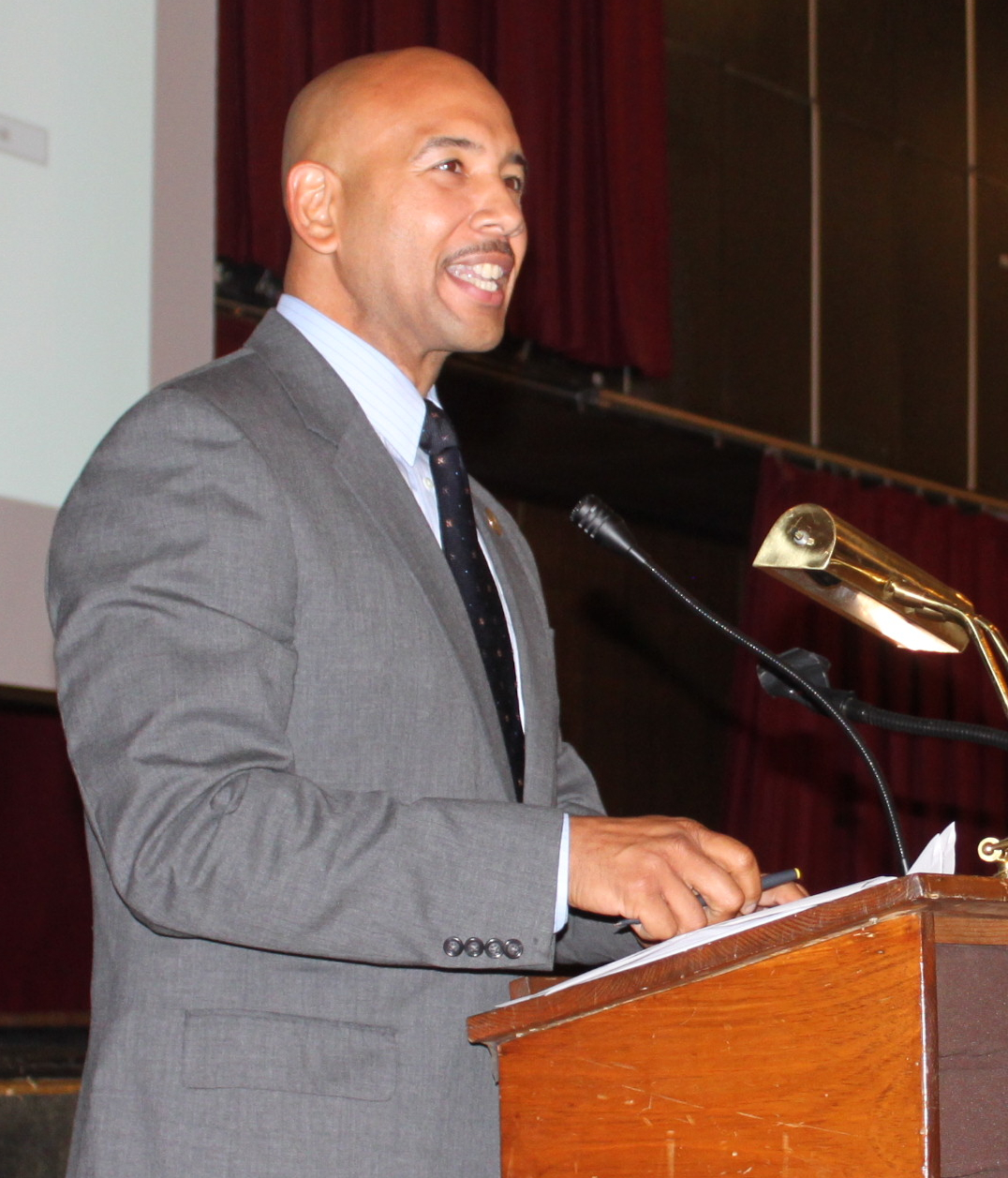
Rubén Díaz Jr.

- Lorraine Cortés-Vázquez – 65th Secretary of State of New York, serving in the Cabinet of Governor David Paterson; of Puerto Rican and Dominican descent
- Nelson Antonio Denis – American former New York politician who represented East Harlem in the New York State Assembly; of Puerto Rican descent
- Anthony D'Esposito – former member of the U.S. representative for New York's 4th congressional district and member of the Hempstead Town Council; of partial Italian descent
- Rubén Díaz Sr. – Puerto Rican born US politician; Democrat; represents the 32nd District in the New York State Senate
- Rubén Díaz Jr. – Democratic Party politician from the Bronx in New York City; son of New York State Senator Rubén Díaz Sr.
- Wilda Díaz – Mayor of Perth Amboy, New Jersey from 2008 to 2020
- Martín Malavé Dilán – member of the New York State Senate representing the 17th Senatorial District
- Pedro Espada Jr. – Democratic member of the New York Senate for the 33rd Senate District; Puerto Rican born, American raised

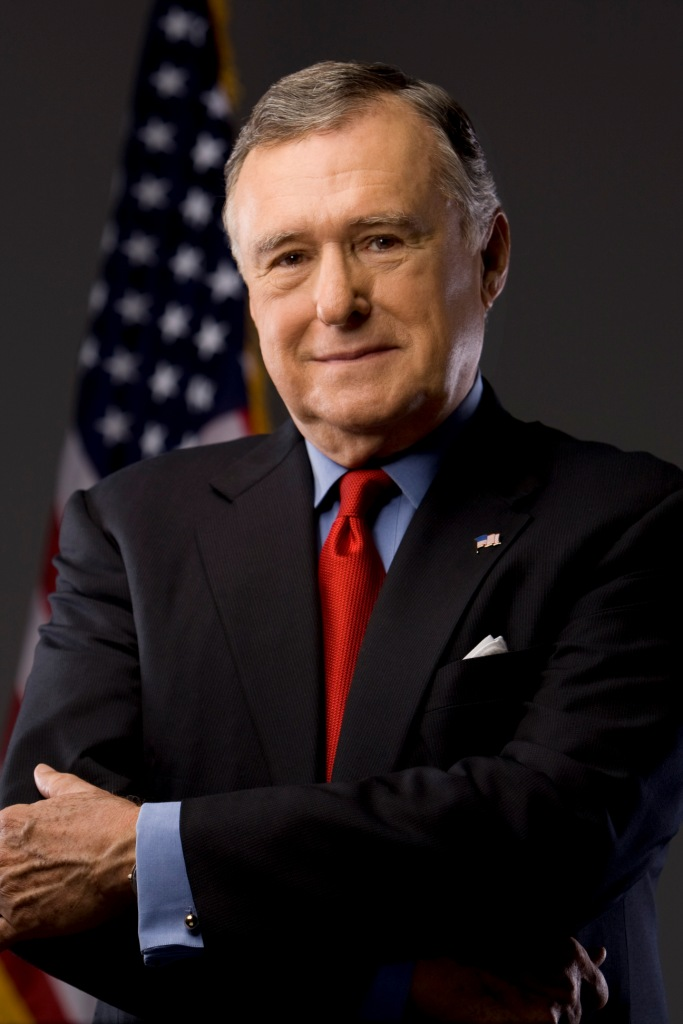
Maurice Ferre

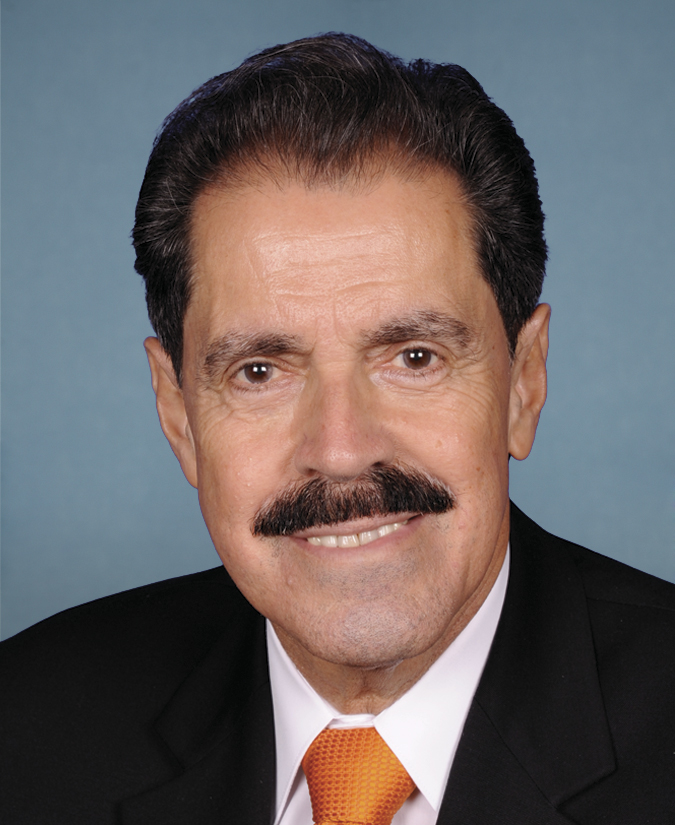
José E. Serrano

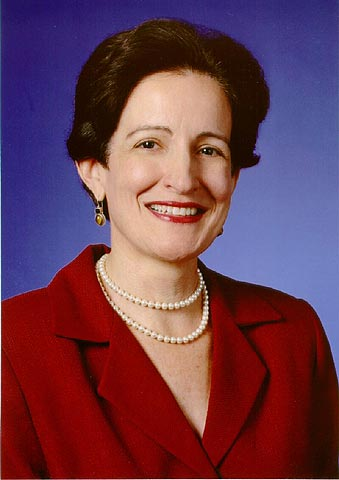
Gloria Tristani

- Maurice Ferré – Puerto Rican former six-term Mayor of Miami
- Melisa López Franzen – Puerto Rican-born minority leader of the Minnesota Senate
- Bonnie García – former representative of California's 80th Assembly District, serving eastern Riverside County and all of Imperial County
- Robert García – former Democratic US Representative who represented New York's 21st district, 1978–1990
- Luis Gutiérrez – US Representative; American of Puerto Rican descent
- Raúl Labrador – Puerto Rican born US Representative for Idaho's 1st congressional district
- Margarita López – openly lesbian former New York City Council Member who represented New York City Council's 2nd district from 1998 to 2005
- Evelyn Mantilla – American politician from Connecticut who served from 1997 to 2007 as a member of the Connecticut House of Representatives
- Melissa Mark-Viverito – elected Speaker of the New York City Council in January 2014
- Olga A. Méndez (1925–2009) – first Puerto Rican woman elected to a state legislature in the US mainland
- Rosie Méndez – American Democratic Party politician in New York
- Tony Méndez – first native-born Puerto Rican to become a district leader of a major political party in New York City
- Hiram Monserrate – former member of the New York State Senate
- Alexandria Ocasio-Cortez – American politician, currently (2019) representing New York's 14th congressional district
- Félix Ortiz – American politician, currently representing New York's 51st Assembly District
- George Pabey – former mayor of East Chicago, Indiana
- César A. Perales – American Secretary of State of New York; of Puerto Rican and Dominican descent
- Eddie Pérez – politician; born in Puerto Rico and raised in the US
- Adam Clayton Powell IV – member of the New York State Assembly
- Nellie Pou – U.S. representative for New Jersey's 9th congressional district, former member of the New Jersey Senate and New Jersey General Assembly
- Luis A. Quintana – Puerto Rican-born who served as Mayor of Newark, New Jersey, from 2013 to 2014
- John Quiñones – first Republican of Puerto Rican ancestry elected to the Florida House of Representatives
- Charles B. Rangel – US Representative for New York's 15th congressional district from 1971 to 2017; son of Puerto Rican father and African American mother
- Samuel Rivera – Democratic mayor of the U.S. city of Passaic, New Jersey (2001–2008)
- Pedro Segarra – politician and Mayor of Hartford, Connecticut; Puerto Rican born and American raised
- José Enrique Serrano – former US Representative; Puerto Rican born, American raised
- José M. Serrano – American New York State Senator; son of José Enrique Serrano
- Darren Soto – Orlando-based attorney and Democratic politician who represents Florida's 9th U.S. congressional district; senator from Florida's 14th Senate District and representative from Florida's 49th House of Representatives District
- Joey Torres – elected mayor of Paterson, New Jersey in 2014, where he had served two prior terms as mayor
- Ritchie Torres – U.S. representative for New York's 15th congressional district, former member of the New York City Council
- Gloria Tristani – served from 1997 to 2001 as the first Hispanic woman member of the Federal Communications Commission
- Miguel del Valle – American politician; former City Clerk of Chicago; Puerto Rican born, American raised
- Nydia Velázquez – Puerto Rican and US Representative
- Raúl G. Villaronga – retired Puerto Rican US Army officer; first Puerto Rican mayor of a Texas city; elected Mayor of Killeen, Texas in 1992

== Visual arts ==
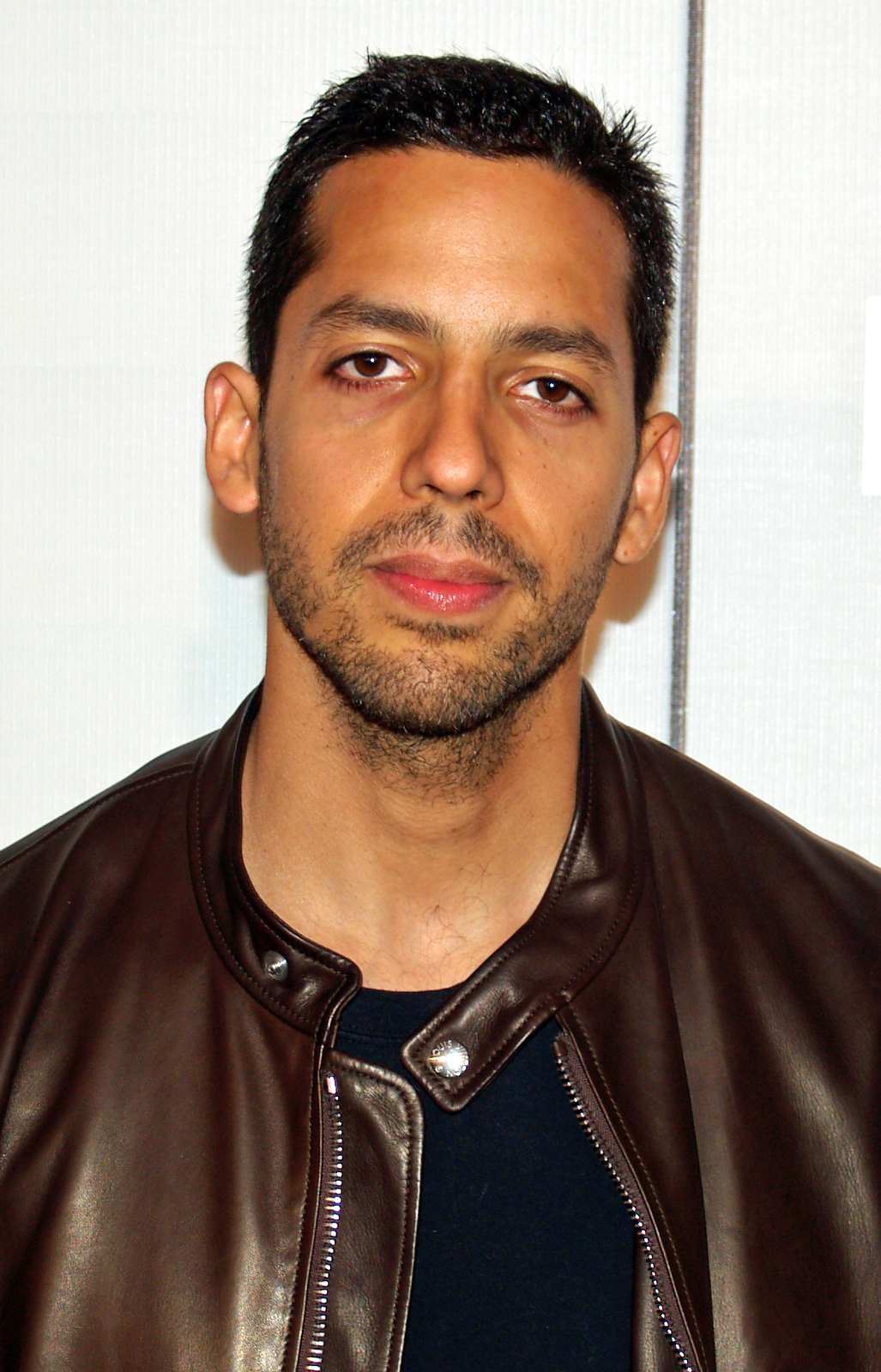
David Blaine

- Olga Albizu (1924–2005) – Puerto Rican abstract expressionist painter; emigrated to New York in 1948
- Fernando Allende (Mexican/Puerto Rican) – with major and successful art exhibits and the inclusion of his art in museums and private collections, Fernando Allende is considered a pioneer on dynamic art represented with the line in motion and connecting in harmony. Participating in the Florence biennial and summer at La Academia, confirms Allende's influence in contemporary abstract art.
- Jean-Michel Basquiat (1960–1988) – visual artist; African-American of Haitian and Puerto Rican descent
- David Blaine – American illusionist, magician, and endurance artist; of Puerto Rican-Russian Jewish descent
- Rafael Ferrer – Puerto Rican artist; 1993 recipient of a Pew Fellowship in the Arts; 2011 recipient of an Annalee and Barnett Newman Foundation Grant
- Elizabeth Marrero – Puerto Rican performance artist, comedian, known as Macha, the "papi chulo drag king", a character she created in 1999; lives in the US
- Soraida Martínez – contemporary abstract expressionist artist who creates hard-edge paintings; American of Puerto Rican descent
- Ralph Ortiz – American artist, educator, and founder of El Museo del Barrio
- Manuel Rivera-Ortiz – Puerto Rican documentary photographer; lives in the US
- Joe Shannon – prolific artist with permanent exhibits in multiple museums in the United States
- Filipo Tirado, aka "Pepe Locuaz" – Puerto Rican puppeteer

== Civil rights and activists ==
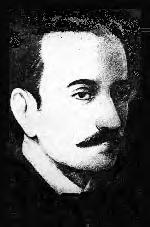
Mathias Brugman

- Mathias Brugman (1811–1868) – leader in Puerto Rico's independence revolution against Spain known as El Grito de Lares (The Cry of Lares); father was Pierre Brugman from Curaçao of Dutch-Jewish ancestry, mother was from Puerto Rico
- Oscar Collazo (1914–1994) – one of two Puerto Ricans who attempted to assassinate US President Harry S. Truman
- Victoria Cruz (1946–2026) – Puerto Rican-born American LGBTQ rights, anti-violence activist, and domestic violence counselor.
- Angelo Falcón – political scientist; President and founder of National Institute for Latino Policy; Puerto Rican born and American raised
- Inéz García – cause celebre of the feminist movement; of Puerto Rican and Cuban descent
- Olga Viscal Garriga (1929–1995) – public orator, political activist; descendant of a former governor of Puerto Rico; advocate for Puerto Rican independence
- Isabel González (1882–1971) – Puerto Rican activist who helped pave the way for Puerto Ricans to be given US citizenship; lived in New York and New Jersey
- Sonia Gutierrez – Puerto Rican-born American educator and Hispanic rights activist.
- Marie Haydée Beltrán Torres – nationalist
- Óscar López Rivera – nationalist pardoned by President Barack Obama
- Eliana Martínez – young AIDS activist in notable Florida court case regarding the rights of HIV+ children in public schools* Sylvia Méndez – American civil rights activist; of Mexican-Puerto Rican heritage
- Eugene Nelson – American labor leader

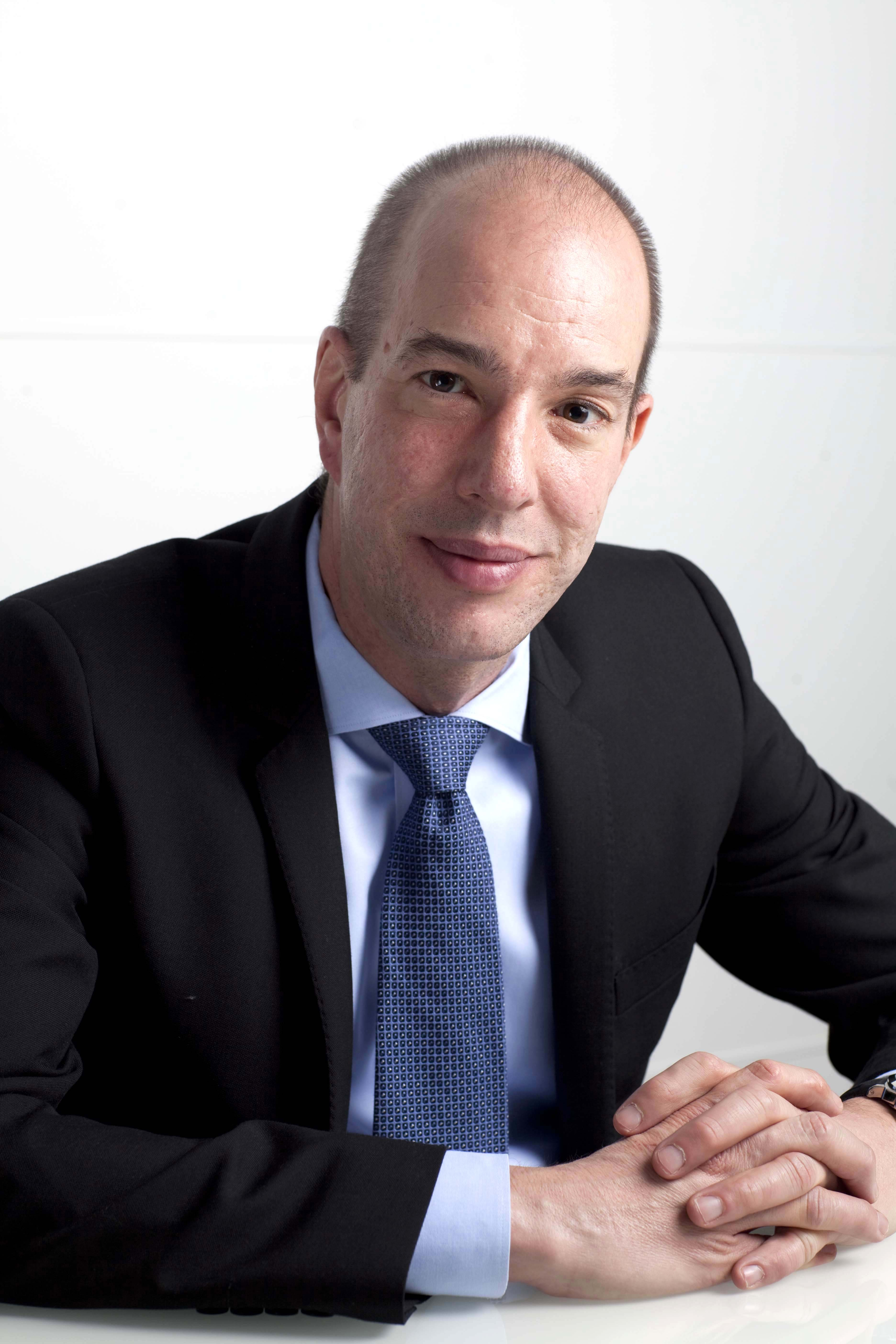
Anthony Romero

- Manuel Olivieri Sánchez (born 1888) – Puerto Rican court interpreter and civil rights activist; led the legal battle which recognized US citizenship for Puerto Ricans living in Hawaii
- Carmen Pola – Puerto Rican long-time politician and community activist in Boston, Massachusetts; first Latina to run for statewide office; first Director of the Office of Constituent Services
- Ronald Rivera (1948–2008) – American activist best known for developing an inexpensive ceramic water filter used to treat gray water in impoverished communities, and for establishing community-based factories to produce the filters around the world
- Sylvia Rae Rivera (1951–2002) – American transgender activist; founding member of the Gay Liberation Front and the Gay Activists Alliance; helped found STAR (Street Transvestite Action Revolutionaries); of Puerto Rican and Venezuelan descent
- Helen Rodríguez-Trías (1929–2001) – American pediatrician, educator and women's rights activist
- Anthony Romero – American executive director of the American Civil Liberties Union
- Arturo Alfonso Schomburg (1874–1938) – Puerto Rican historian, writer, and activist in the US who raised awareness of the social contributions made by Afro-Latin Americans and Afro-Americans; died in New York
- Yolanda Serrano (-1993) – Puerto Rican-born New Yorker HIV/AIDS activist and a Ms. magazine woman of the year
- Alejandrina Torres – nationalist
- Griselio Torresola (1925–1950) – one of two Puerto Rican Nationalists who attempted to assassinate US President Harry Truman; Puerto Rico born

== Physicians and scientists ==
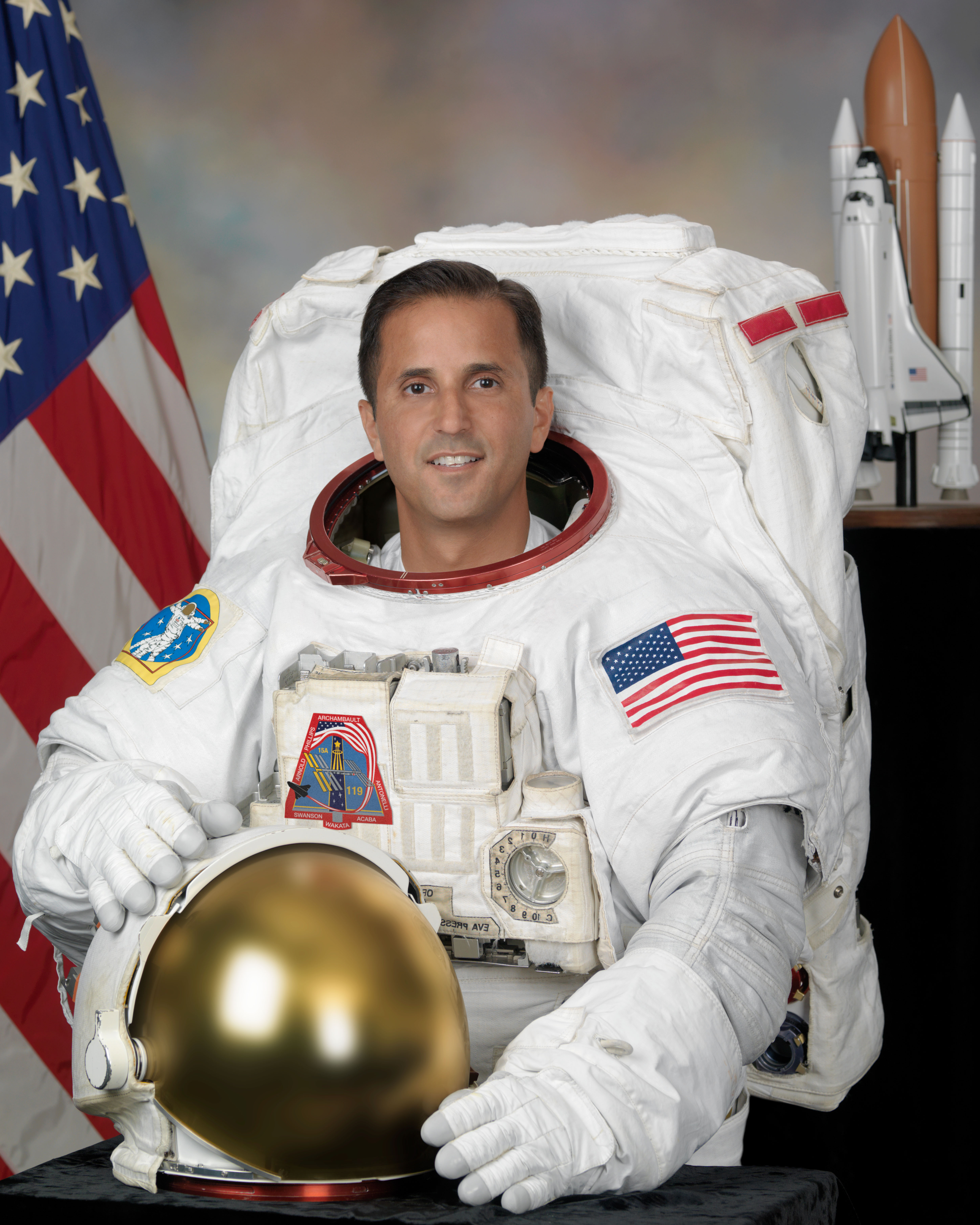
Joseph M. Acaba

- Joseph M. Acabá – American educator, hydrogeologist, and NASA astronaut; parents are Puerto Rican
- Oxiris Barbot, Commissioner of Health of the City of New York
- Víctor Manuel Blanco, PhD (1918–2011) – Puerto Rican astronomer; in 1959 discovered "Blanco 1," a galactic cluster; died in Florida
- Rafael L. Brás – American civil engineer; Provost to the Georgia Institute of Technology; Puerto Rican-born
- Neil deGrasse Tyson – American astrophysicist, author, and science communicator. His mother is of Puerto Rican ancestry.
- Enectalí Figueroa-Feliciano, PhD, aka "Tali" – astrophysicist and researcher with NASA Goddard Space Flight Center; pioneered the development of position-sensitive detectors
- Estevan Antonio Fuertes (1838-1903) – civil engineer and professor of astronomy at Cornell University
- James Hillhouse Fuertes (1863-1932) – civil and sanitary engineer
- Louis Agassiz Fuertes (1874-1927) – ornithologist, naturalist, and prolific illustrator of birds
- Ramón E. López – space physicist and author
- Lissette Martínez – lead electrical engineer for the Space Experiment Module program at the Wallops Flight Facility
- Joseph O. Prewitt Díaz, PhD – retired psychologist; specialized in psychosocial theory; first Puerto Rican recipient of the American Psychological Association; 2008 International Humanitarian Award
- Pedro Rodríguez, PhD – Director of a test laboratory at NASA; inventor of a portable, battery-operated lift seat for people suffering from knee arthritis
- Fernando E. Rodríguez Vargas, DDS (1888–1932) – odontologist (dentist), scientist and a major in the US Army who discovered the bacteria which causes cavities
- Gualberto Ruaño, MD, PhD – pioneer in the field of personalized medicine; inventor of molecular diagnostic systems used worldwide for the management of viral diseases

== Religious ==
- Nicky Cruz (born 1938) – Christian evangelist; founder of Nicky Cruz Outreach, an evangelistic Christian ministry
- Alberto Cutié – Puerto Rican Episcopal cleric better known as Padre Alberto; ordained a Roman Catholic priest in 1995; became an internationally recognizable name by hosting television and radio programs
- José Luis de Jesús – founder and leader of Creciendo en Gracia's Christian ministry (Growing In Grace International Ministry, Inc.), based in Miami, Florida
- Bavi Edna Rivera, aka "Nedi" – American suffragan bishop and Episcopal priest; daughter of the late bishop Victor Manuel Rivera and an Anglo mother
- Víctor Manuel Rivera (1916–2005) – Puerto Rican born American Episcopalian priest and bishop

== Writers ==
- Jack Agüeros – community activist, poet, writer, and translator
- Quiara Alegría Hudes – American playwright and author, known for writing the book for the Tony Award-winning musical In the Heights; of Jewish and Puerto Rican descent
- Miguel Algarín – Puerto Rican poet, writer, co-founder of the Nuyorican Poets Café
- Rane Arroyo (1954–2010) – American poet, playwright, and scholar; of Puerto Rican descent
- Pura Belpré (1899 or 1903–1982) – author; first Puerto Rican librarian in New York City
- Giannina Braschi – Puerto Rican poet and novelist; lives in New York
- Julia de Burgos (1914–1953) – considered by many as the greatest Puerto Rican poet and one of the greatest female poets of Latin America; died in New York
- Judith Ortiz Cofer (born 1952) – author; Puerto Rican-born and American raised
- Jesús Colón (1901–1974) – Puerto Rican writer, known as the "father of the Nuyorican movement"
- Víctor Hernández Cruz – Puerto Rican poet; New York resident
- Nicholas Dante (1941–1991) – American dancer and writer; Puerto Rican parents
- Nelson Denis (born 1954) – Author of War Against All Puerto Ricans, film director, and former New York State Assemblyman
- Sandra María Esteves – American poet, playwright, and graphic artist; of Puerto Rican, Dominican and African American descent
- Lawrence La Fountain-Stokes – Puerto Rican author, scholar, and performer; lives in Michigan
- Pedro J. Labarthe (1905–1966) – Puerto Rican poet, journalist, essayist, and novelist
- Tato Laviera – Nuyorican poet; born in Puerto Rico; moved to New York City with his family in 1960
- Muna Lee (1895–1965) – American author and poet; known for her writings that promoted Pan-Americanism and feminism
- Érika López – American cartoonist, novelist, and performance artist; of Puerto Rican and German American descent
- Caridad de la Luz, aka "La Bruja" (The "Good" Witch) – poet, actress and activist; parents are Puerto Rican
- Nemir Matos-Cintrón – Puerto Rican author; lives in Florida

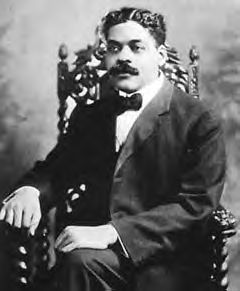
Arturo Alfonso Schomburg

- John Meléndez, aka "Stuttering John" – American television writer and former radio personality
- Nicholasa Mohr – one of the best known Nuyorican writers
- Micol Ostow – American author, editor and educator; Jewish-American father, Puerto Rican mother
- George Pérez – Puerto Rican-American writer and illustrator of comic books; his family moved from Caguas to the New York area in the 1940s
- Pedro Pietri (1944–2004) – Nuyorican poet and playwright; co-founded the Nuyorican Poets Cafe; Puerto Rican born and American raised
- Carmen M. Pursifull – former New York City Latin dance and Latin American music figure of the 1950s, and since 1970 in Illinois; English-language free verse poet; of Puerto Rican and Spanish descent
- Marie Teresa Ríos (1917–1999) – American author of a book which was the basis for the 1960s television sitcom The Flying Nun; of Puerto Rican and Irish descent
- Ángel Rivero Méndez – wrote Crónica de la guerra hispano-americana en Puerto Rico, which is considered one of the most complete works written in regard to that military action
- Esmeralda Santiago – Puerto Rican author and former actress known for her novels and memoirs
- Tony Santiago – Puerto Rican military historian
- Arturo Alfonso Schomburg, aka Arthur Schomburg (1874–1938) – Puerto Rican historian, writer, and activist in the US who raised awareness of the social contributions made by Afro-Latin Americans and Afro-Americans; died in New York; immigrated to New York in 1891
- Piri Thomas (1928–2011) – writer and American poet; memoir Down These Mean Streets became a best-seller; Puerto Rican mother, Cuban father
- Edwin Torres – Nuyorican poet
- Ed Vega (1936–2008) – Puerto Rican novelist and short story writer
- Irene Vilar – editor, literary agent, author of books dealing with national and generational trauma and women's reproductive rights
- William Carlos Williams (1883–1963) – American poet, closely associated with modernism and Imagism; of English and Puerto Rican descent

== Others ==
- Aída Álvarez – first Hispanic woman and Puerto Rican to hold a US Cabinet-level position; grew up in New York
- Nixzmary Brown (1998–2006) – seven-year-old abused child and murder victim from the Bedford-Stuyvesant, Brooklyn section of New York City; of Puerto Rican and Pakistani descent
- Marta Casals Istomin – former president of the Manhattan School of Music; Puerto Rican born
- Carmen Carrera – American reality television personality
- Desiree Casado (born 1985) – former actress
- Chris Kubecka – (full name Christina Kubecka de Medina, Computer Science, Cyberwar) established international business operations for Saudi Aramco after the world's most devastating Shamoon cyberwarfare attacks. Kubecka helped halt the second wave of July 2009 cyberattacks cyberwar attacks against South Korea.
- Angie Martínez – American radio personality
- Samuel A. Ramírez, Sr. – first Hispanic to launch a successful investment banking firm; parents are Puerto Ricans
- Gabriela Rose Reagan (born 1988) – former actress, and daughter of Sonia Manzano
- Félix Rigau Carrera (1894–1954) – first Puerto Rican pilot
- José Rodríguez (intelligence) – head of CIA division (2004–2008)
- Cara Santa Maria (born 1983) – American science communicator

== See also ==
- List of Hispanic and Latino Americans
- List of Puerto Ricans
- List of Spanish Americans
- Puerto Rican migration to New York
- Puerto Rican citizenship
- Outline of Puerto Rico
- Cultural diversity in Puerto Rico
  - Corsican immigration to Puerto Rico
  - Chinese immigration to Puerto Rico
  - French immigration to Puerto Rico
  - Crypto-Judaism
  - German immigration to Puerto Rico
  - Irish immigration to Puerto Rico
  - Royal Decree of Graces of 1815
- History of women in Puerto Rico
- Military history of Puerto Rico
- National Register of Historic Places listings in Puerto Rico
- Piragua (food)
- 51-star flag
