= Puerto Ricans in New York City =

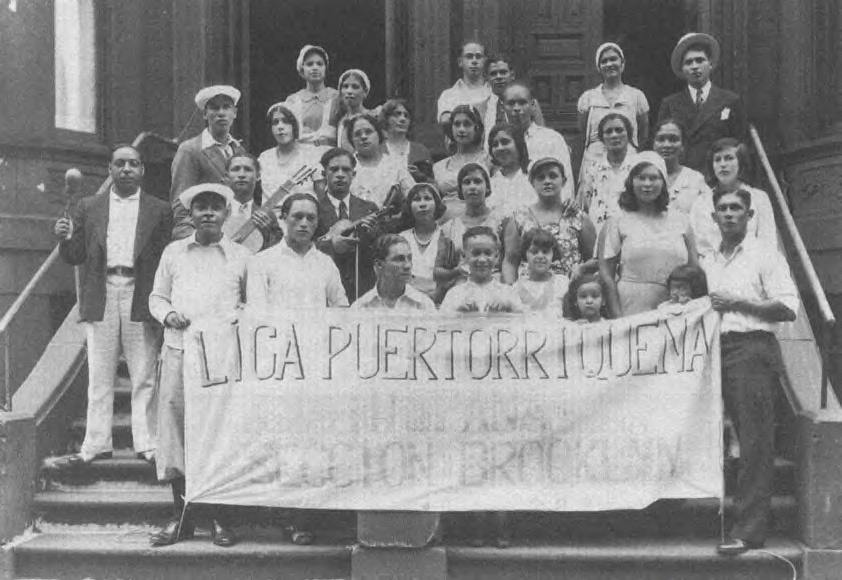
Early Puerto Rican immigrants in New York City

The first Puerto Ricans known to have migrated to New York City did so in the mid-1800s when Spain ruled Puerto Rico. Another wave of Puerto Ricans migrated to New York City after the Spanish–American War in 1898. Though no longer subjects of Spain, they were now citizens of an American possession and needed passports to travel to the contiguous United States.

That was until 1917, when the United States Congress approved Jones–Shafroth Act which gave Puerto Ricans in Puerto Rico U.S. citizenship with certain limitations. Puerto Ricans living in the Mainland United States, however, were given full American citizenship and were allowed to seek political office in the states in which they resided. Two months later, when Congress passed the Selective Service Act, conscription was extended to the Puerto Ricans both on the island and on the mainland. It was expected that Puerto Rican men 18 years and older serve in the U.S. military during World War I. The Jones–Shafroth Act also allowed Puerto Ricans to travel between Puerto Rico and the U.S. mainland without a passport. The advent of air travel was one of the principal factors that led to the largest wave of migration of Puerto Ricans to New York City in the 1950s, known as "The Great Migration."

In New York City and other northeastern cities such as Philadelphia and Boston, Puerto Ricans were the first Hispanics to come in large numbers as early as the 1940s, being seen as the "Pioneer" group among the Hispanic community in those cities. From 1970 to about 1990, the city's Puerto Rican population was at its height. They represented up to 80% of the city's Hispanic community and 12% of the city's total population. At that time, nearly 70% of Puerto Ricans in the Mainland United States lived in New York City. It was only in the 1990s that the proportion of Puerto Ricans that made up the city's Hispanic community and the population as a whole started to decrease, largely because of a declining Puerto Rican population, an increasingly diverse Hispanic community, and economic changes associated with New York's declining industrialism. The 2020 Census showed that New York's Puerto Rican population continued to decline over the preceding decade despite estimates that fostered contrary expectations.

According to the 2010 Census, Puerto Ricans represented 8.9% of the population of New York City (32% of the city's Hispanic community) and 5.5% of that of New York State. The Puerto Rican share of New York City decreased to 6.7% by 2020 as Puerto Ricans left the city and new arrivals from the island increasingly went to other destinations. Of over a million Puerto Ricans in the state, about 70% live in New York City, with the remaining portion scattered in the city's suburbs and other major cities in New York State. Although Florida has received some dispersal of the population, the late 2000s and the early 2010s saw a resurgence in Puerto Rican migration to New York and New Jersey, primarily for economic and cultural considerations, topped by another surge of arrivals after Hurricane Maria devastated Puerto Rico in September 2017. Consequently, the New York City Metropolitan Area witnessed a significant increase in its Nuyorican population, New Yorkers of Puerto Rican descent, from 1,177,430 in 2010 to a Census-estimated 1,494,670 in 2016, followed by a decline to 1,072,950 in 2022. Despite those changes, New York remains the most important cultural and demographic center for Puerto Ricans outside San Juan.

== Early 19th century ==
During the 19th century, commerce existed between the ports of the East Coast of the United States and the Spanish colony of Puerto Rico. Ship records show that many Puerto Ricans traveled on ships that sailed from and to the U.S. and Puerto Rico. Many of them settled in places such as New York, Connecticut, and Massachusetts. Upon the outbreak of the American Civil War, many Puerto Ricans, such as Lieutenant Augusto Rodriguez, joined the ranks of the armed forces, however since Puerto Ricans were Spanish subjects they were inscribed as Spaniards. The earliest Puerto Rican enclave in New York City was in Manhattan. Most of the Puerto Ricans who moved there came from well-to-do families or were people whose economic situation could permit them the luxury of traveling from the island to New York City by way of steamship, an expensive and long trip. Amongst the first Puerto Ricans to immigrate to New York City were men and women who were exiled by the Spanish Crown for their political beliefs and struggles for the cause of Puerto Rican independence. By 1850, Puerto Rico and Cuba were the only two remaining Spanish colonies in the New World. The Spanish Crown would either imprison or banish any person who promoted the independence of both nations. Two of those exiles were Ramón Emeterio Betances and Segundo Ruiz Belvis who together founded "The Revolutionary Committee of Puerto Rico" in New York. They were the planners of the short and failed 1868 revolt against Spain in Puerto Rico known as El Grito de Lares. Another prominent Puerto Rican who in 1871 immigrated to New York was Arturo Alfonso Schomburg, considered by many as the "Father of Black History". He became a member of the "Revolutionary Committee of Puerto Rico" and was an outspoken promoter of the independence of Puerto Rico but also of Cuba.

== Origins of the Puerto Rican Flag ==
Four other Puerto Ricans who moved to New York because of political reasons were Manuel Besosa, Antonio Vélez Alvarado, Juan Ríus Rivera, and Francisco Gonzalo Marín. These four Puerto Ricans joined the Cuban Liberation Army whose headquarters was in New York City.

Some sources document Francisco Gonzalo Marín with presenting a Puerto Rican flag prototype in 1895 for adoption by the Puerto Rican Revolutionary Committee in New York City. Marín has since been credited by some with the flag's design. There is a letter written by Juan de Mata Terreforte which gives credit to Marin. The original contents of the letter in Spanish are the following:

"La adopción de la bandera cubana con los colores invertidos me fue sugerida por el insigne patriota Francisco Gonzalo Marín en una carta que me escribió desde Jamaica. Yo hice la proposición a los patriotas puertorriqueños que asistieron al mitin de Chimney Hall y fue aprobada unánimemente."

Which translated in English states the following:

The adaptation of the Cuban flag with the colors inverted was suggested by the patriot Francisco Gonzalo Marín in a letter which he wrote from Jamaica. I made the proposition to various Puerto Rican patriots during a meeting at Chimney Hall and it was approved unanimously.

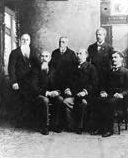
Puerto Rican Revolutionary Committee (standing L-R) Manuel Besosa, Aurelio Méndez Martínez, and Sotero Figueroa (seated L-R) Juan de M. Terreforte, D. Jose Julio Henna and Roberto H. Todd

It is also believed that on June 12, 1892, Antonio Vélez Alvarado was at his apartment at 219 Twenty-Third Street in Manhattan, when he stared at a Cuban flag for a few minutes, and then took a look at the blank wall in which it was being displayed. Vélez suddenly perceived an optical illusion, in which he perceived the image of the Cuban flag with the colors in the flag's triangle and stripes inverted. Almost immediately he visited a nearby merchant, Domingo Peraza, from whom he bought some crepe paper to build a crude prototype. He later displayed his prototype in a dinner meeting at his neighbor's house, where the owner, Micaela Dalmau vda. de Carreras, had invited José Martí as a guest.

In a letter written by Maria Manuela (Mima) Besosa, the daughter of the Puerto Rican Revolutionary Committee member Manuel Besosa, she stated that she sewed the flag. That message created a belief that her father could have been its designer.

Even though Marín presented the Puerto Rican Flag in New York's "Chimney Corner Hotel", it may never be known who designed the current flag. What is known, however, is that on December 22, 1895, the Puerto Rican Revolutionary Committee officially adopted a design which is today the official flag of Puerto Rico.

In 1897, Antonio Mattei Lluberas, a wealthy coffee plantation owner from Yauco, visited the Puerto Rican Revolutionary Committee in New York City. There he met with Ramón Emeterio Betances, Juan de Mata Terreforte and Aurelio Méndez Martinez and together they proceeded to plan a major coup. The uprising, which became known as the Intentona de Yauco was to be directed by Betances, organized by Aurelio Mendez Mercado and the armed forces were to be commanded by General Juan Ríus Rivera from Cuba. The political immigration to New York practically came to a halt in 1898 after the Spanish–American War when Puerto Rico became a possession of the United States. It is estimated that 1,800 Puerto Rican citizens, who were not American citizens until 1917, had immigrated to New York during this period.

== Early 20th century ==
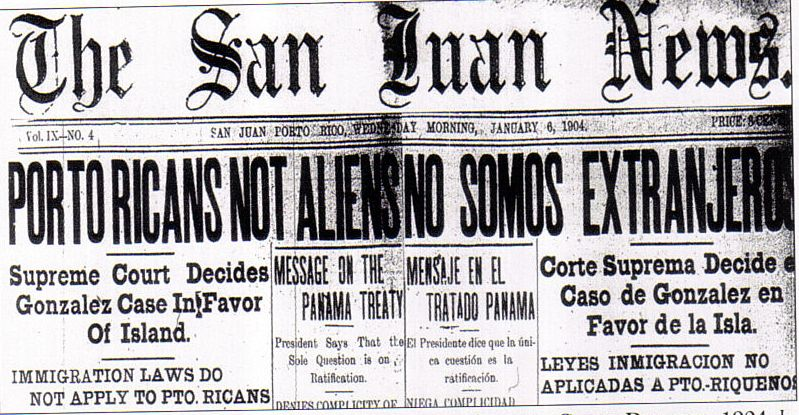
Cover of The San Juan News announcing the Supreme Court decision in the Isabel Gonzalez case of 1904

In 1902, the United States Treasury Department issued new immigration guidelines that changed the status of all Puerto Ricans to "foreigners". Isabel González was a young single mother who was expecting her second child. Her fiancé, who was in New York, sent for her with the intention of getting married. When Gonzalez arrived in New York, she and all the Puerto Ricans who were with her, were detained in Ellis Island and denied entry. She was accused of being an alien and as an unwed parent she was deemed as a burden to the welfare system of the country. González challenged the Government of the United States in the groundbreaking case "GONZALES v. WILLIAMS' (her surname was misspelled by immigration officials). The Supreme Court ruled that under the immigration laws González was not an alien, and therefore could not be denied entry into New York. It also stated that Puerto Ricans were not U.S. citizens, they were "noncitizen nationals". González, who became an activist on behalf of all Puerto Ricans, paved the way for the Jones–Shafroth Act, which conferred United States citizenship on all citizens of Puerto Rico.

In 1917, the United States entered World War I and that same year the United States Congress approved the Jones–Shafroth Act which gave Puerto Ricans U.S. citizenship. Puerto Ricans no longer needed a passport to travel to the U.S. and were allowed to seek public office in the U.S. mainland. The economic situation in the island was bad and continued to worsen as a result of the many hurricanes which destroyed most of its crops. Many Puerto Rican families migrated to the United States, the bulk of whom went to New York, in search of a better way of life. In New York, they faced the same hardships and discrimination that earlier groups of immigrants, such as the Irish, the Italians, and the Jews, had faced earlier. It was difficult for them to find well-paying jobs because of the language barrier and their lack of technical working skills. The few men who found jobs worked for low salaries in factories. The women usually stayed home as housewives and tended to their children. Those who did not find jobs had the option of joining the United States Military. Prior to the Jones–Shafroth Act, Puerto Ricans in the Mainland United States as all other non-citizens, who were permanent residents were required to register with the Selective Service System by law and could be drafted, however one of the effects of the Act was that all Puerto Ricans were now eligible for the military "draft" (conscription). One of the military units at that time was New York's U.S. 369th Infantry Regiment. Rafael Hernández was a Puerto Rican who served in the almost all Afro-American unit. The unit fought against the Germans in France and became known as the "Harlem Hellfighters". Hernández, his brother Jesus and 16 other Puerto Ricans were assigned to the United States Army's Harlem Hellfighters musical band, the Orchestra Europe.

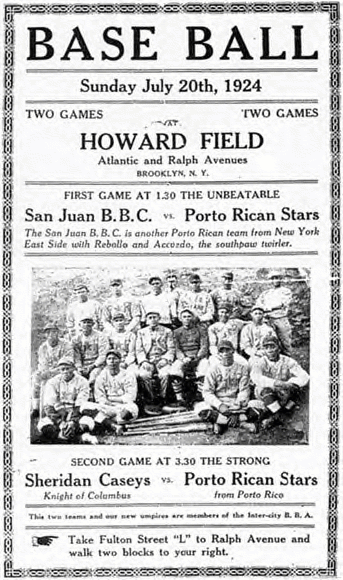
1924 Baseball Game between the San Juan BBC and Porto Rico Stars in New York

Nero Chen was one of the many Puerto Ricans who settled in East Harlem. He became the first Puerto Rican boxer to gain acclaim when in 1917 he fought against "Panama Joe Gans" at Harlem's Palace Casino which was located at 28 East 135th St., between Fifth and Madison Avenues, in Manhattan. As evidenced by an early 1924 poster, migrants in New York organized baseball teams which played against each other. The poster announces a game which was held at Howard Field in Brooklyn between two teams, the San Juan B.B.C. and the Porto Rican Stars, made of Puerto Ricans from the East Side section of Manhattan.

As the economic situation in the United States worsened in a prelude to the Great Depression, many Puerto Ricans in the mainland found themselves competing with other groups for the positions of unskilled labor such as dishwashers, maintenance and laundry workers. That led to the "Harlem Riots" of July 1926 between unemployed Jews and Puerto Ricans. Various Puerto Rican organizations in East Harlem organized a media campaign to ease the tensions between the groups involved and called upon the mayor, governor of the state to restore order and provide protection to the area.

In 1937, Oscar Garcia Rivera, Sr. (1900–1969), a native of Mayagüez and resident of East Harlem, became the first Puerto Rican to be elected to public office in the continental United States as a member of the New York State Assembly. A witness of the discrimination which Puerto Ricans were subject to, he created the "Unemployment Insurance Bill" which paved the way for the passage of bills which established minimum hours and wages for working people, the creation of a Wage Board within the Labor Department, and the right of employees to organize and negotiate grievances. In 1956, he also became the first Puerto Rican to be nominated as the Republican candidate for Justice of the City Court.

== Tabaqueros ==
Tabaqueros in Yauco, Puerto Rico rolling cigars by hand

Tabaqueros are tobacco workers. The tobacco industry was extremely popular but increased in popularity and manufacturing during the first decade of the United States domination of exportation. By 1901, Puerto Rico shifted from importing to exporting, and cigar making began to increase. By the 1920s, the Puerto Rican tobacco-processing industry exports grew thirty times from when it began in 1901. That provided thousands of migrants with job opportunities to move to the United States in search of better economic opportunities.

During this time of industrial prosperity, the Puerto Rican community grew in cities like New York City. Bernardo Vega explained in his memoir, Memoirs of Bernardo Vega the lifestyle of the working Puerto Rican community in New York City more importantly the tabaquero culture. Tabaqueros were very politically and socially involved in their communities, and were successfully organized collectively as a group. Politically tabaqueros were suspected of socialist orientation, and were influenced by the Jewish Workmen Circle, that were mutual aid societies of the working-class socialists. Those mutual aid groups and tobacco worker's associations were no mimic to those existing for other working class of other ethnic groups and recreated organizations that were known to the workers back on the island. The life of a tabaquero was then very simple, but it was a very progressive working community, which understood how cultural form/discrimination could reflect political will towards the community. The Tabaqueros held a sense of pride in their work as well as their eloquent knowledge of politics and culture, which they would learn during working hours and events of associations like Circulo de Tabaqueros. Hand rolling cigars gave pride to the workers as they found this job to be more on the artistic side rather than domestic. They thought of themselves more like an "artist rather than a worker."

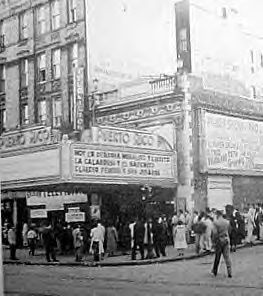
Teatro Puerto Rico

Cigarmakers would sit in front of tables for hours and hand roll each cigar. Since that was a very tedious process, workers would pay 15–20 cents each week for someone to read them the newspaper or books while they worked. That was more of a custom in the Puerto Rican cigar making factories. Many newspapers and magazines that would advocate social and political doctrines were published in Spanish in New York City: Cultura Proletria an anarchist read; more general-topics El Heraldo; La Prensa, was a daily that began to be published in 1913. Mainly at this time, the readers were women, who would read but they were only reading at factories but also rolling the cigars themselves. By the 1920s, the economic depression hit industry hard. Many cigar workers and tabaqueros were going on strike because of pay. Tabaqueros traditionally were known in the community for being the highest-paid workers in the Puerto Rican community. However now with the crisis, factories began to move and seek workers like women to take over the tabaquero skill for cheap labor. By 1920, there were 8,766 women working in those factories. Women that worked in tobacco factories mainly did leaf stripping and were considered to be equal in the structural exploitation of labor. For the unions of the tabaqueros the difference in sex/gender of the worker did not matter in the fight against exploitation.

== World War II and The Great Migration ==
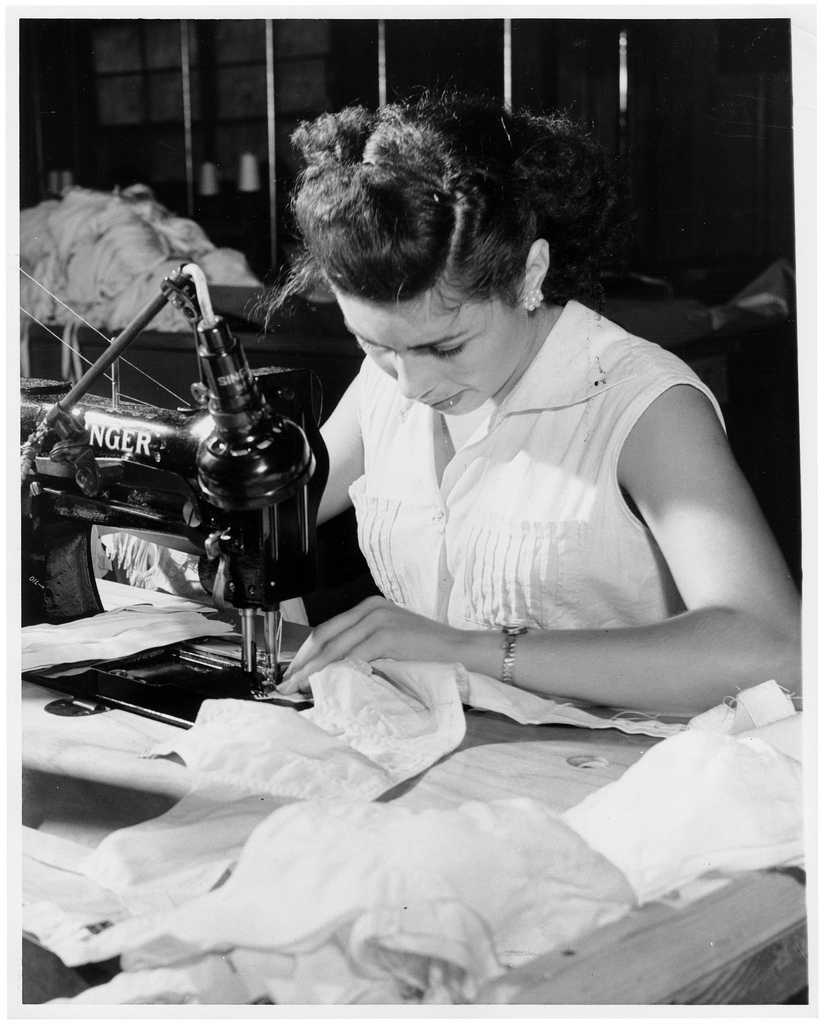
A Puerto Rican woman working in a garment factory

Several factors contributed and led to what came to be known as "The Great Migration" of Puerto Ricans to New York such as the Great Depression, World War II, and the advent of air travel.

The Great Depression spread throughout the world and was also felt in Puerto Rico. Since the island's economy was and still is dependent to that of the mainland, it was to be expected that when the American banks and industries began to fail the effect would be felt in the island. Unemployment was on the rise as a consequence and so many families fled to the Mainland United States in search of jobs.

The outbreak of World War II opened the doors to many of the migrants who were searching for jobs. Since a large portion of the male population of the U.S. was sent to war, there was a sudden need of manpower to fulfill the jobs left behind. Puerto Ricans, both male and female, found themselves employed in factories and ship docks, producing both domestic and warfare goods. The new migrants gained the knowledge and working skills, which would later serve them well. The military also provided a steady source of income, in 1944, the Puerto Rican WAC unit, Company 6, 2nd Battalion, 21st Regiment of the Women's Army Auxiliary Corps, a segregated Hispanic unit, was assigned to the New York Port of Embarkation, after their basic training at Fort Oglethorpe, Georgia. They were assigned to work in military offices, which planned the shipment of troops around the world.

The advent of air travel provided Puerto Ricans with an affordable and faster way of travel to New York. The one thing that most migrants had in common was that they wanted a better way of life than was available in Puerto Rico. Although they had their own personal reasons for migrating, their decision generally was rooted in the island's impoverished conditions, as well as the public policies that sanctioned migration.

In 1948, the Migration Division of the Department of Labor of Puerto Rico opened its office in New York City. Its mission was to mediate between the island and the New York/Puerto Rican community, assuage the adjustment experience of new arrivals, and generally inform them about jobs, housing and other critical concerns. It wasn't long before the Puerto Rican "Barrios" in the Williamsburg, Bushwick, South Bronx, Spanish Harlem, and Manhattan's Lower East Side began to resemble "Little Puerto Ricos" with their "Bodegas" (small grocery stores) and "Piragueros" (Puerto Rican shaved ice venders) in every corner. It is estimated that from 1946 to 1950 there were 31,000 Puerto Rican migrants each year to New York.

=== Puerto Rican culture in New York ===
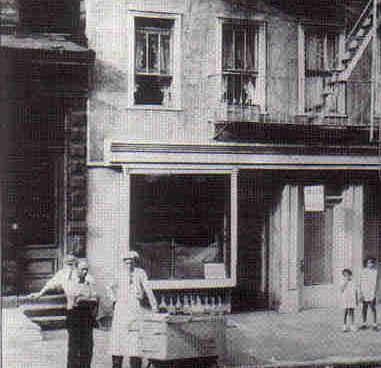
A piragüero in NYC posing with his Piragua pushcart in the 1920s

Puerto Ricans began to form their own small "barrios", in The Bronx, Brooklyn, and in East Harlem (which would become known as Spanish Harlem). It was in East Harlem where the Puerto Rican migrants established a cultural life of great vitality and sociality. They also participated in some of the sports, such as boxing and baseball which were first introduced in the island by the U.S. Army after the Spanish–American War.

Puerto Ricans who moved to New York took with them their customs and traditions such as their piraguas, a Puerto Rican frozen treat, shaped like a pyramid, made of shaved ice and covered with fruit flavored syrup. According to Holding Aloft the Banner of Ethiopia: by Winston James, piraguas were introduced in New York by Puerto Ricans as early as 1926.

=== Puerto Rican music in New York ===
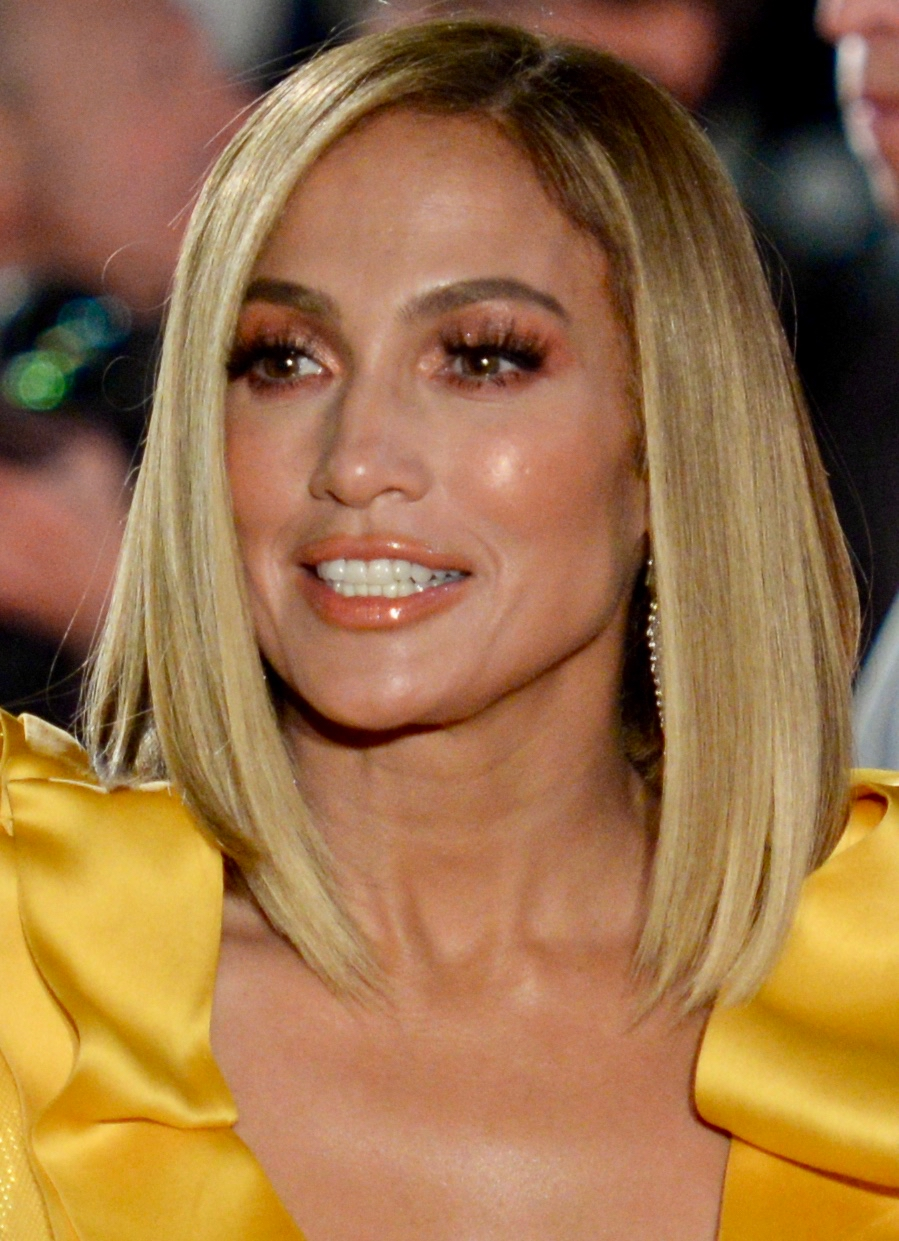
Jennifer Lopez, one of the highest-grossing and most multi-faceted triple threat entertainers in global history, is a Nuyorican.

Puerto Rican music flourished with the likes of Rafael Hernández and Pedro Flores who formed the "Trio Borincano" and gained recognition in the city. Myrta Silva who later joined Hernandez's "Cuarteto Victoria" also gained fame as a singer after the group traveled and played throughout the United States.

Puerto Ricans played an important role in the New York's Latin dance and jazz scenes between the World Wars, with singer and band leader Manuel Jimenez ("El Canario") popularizing the traditional Puerto Rican plena through his big band arrangements. Nuyorican band leaders Tito Puente and Tito Rodriguez popularized the mambo style in the 1950s and early 1960s, which was followed by the emergence of salsa in the late 1960s with a younger generation of Nuyorican musicians led by Willie Colon, Ray Barretto, and the Fania Allstars. Joe Cuba and other Nuyoricans fused mambo and Cuban dance rhythms with African American rhythm and blues to create the popular New York boogaloo sound in the 1960s. In the 1980s, Nuyorican Break dancers Rock Steady Crew and DJ Charlie Chase helped shape the early South Bronx hip hop scene.

Following the in migration of large numbers of Puerto Ricans to New York in the 1950s, folk style jibaro, bomba, and plena music became part of the cultural fabric of East Harlem (El Barrio) and the South Bronx. The Afro Puerto Rican styles of bomba and plena enjoyed a renaissance in New York in the 1980s and 1990s through the efforts of the drum and dance ensemble Los Pleneros de la 21, led by Santurce native Juan "Junago" Guiterrez.

The South Bronx became a hub for Puerto Rican music. Theaters that had served to previous groups of immigrants, such as the Irish and the Italians, for their dramatic works or vaudeville style shows, now served the growing Puerto Rican and Latino population with musical performances from musicians from Puerto Rico and Latin America. Plus, the local Bronx's burgeoning Latino musicians. Among those theaters were the historical Teatro Puerto Rico at E. 138th St. and Hunts Point Palace in Southern Blvd. During the Teatro Puerto Rico's "golden era", which lasted from 1947 to 1956, musician José Feliciano made his stateside debut

New York City also became the mecca for freestyle music in the 1980s of which Puerto Rican singer-songwriters represented an integral component. Puerto Rican influence in popular music continues in the 21st century, encompassing major artists such as Jennifer Lopez.

== 1950s ==
The third great wave of domestic migration from Puerto Rico came after World War II. Nearly 40,000 Puerto Ricans settled in New York City in 1946, and 58,500 in 1952–53. Many soldiers who returned after World War II made use of the GI Bill and went to college. Puerto Rican women confronted economic exploitation, discrimination, racism, and the insecurities inherent in the migration process on a daily basis, however they fared better than did men in the job market. The women left their homes for the factories in record numbers. By 1953, Puerto Rican migration to New York reached its peak when 75,000 people left the island.

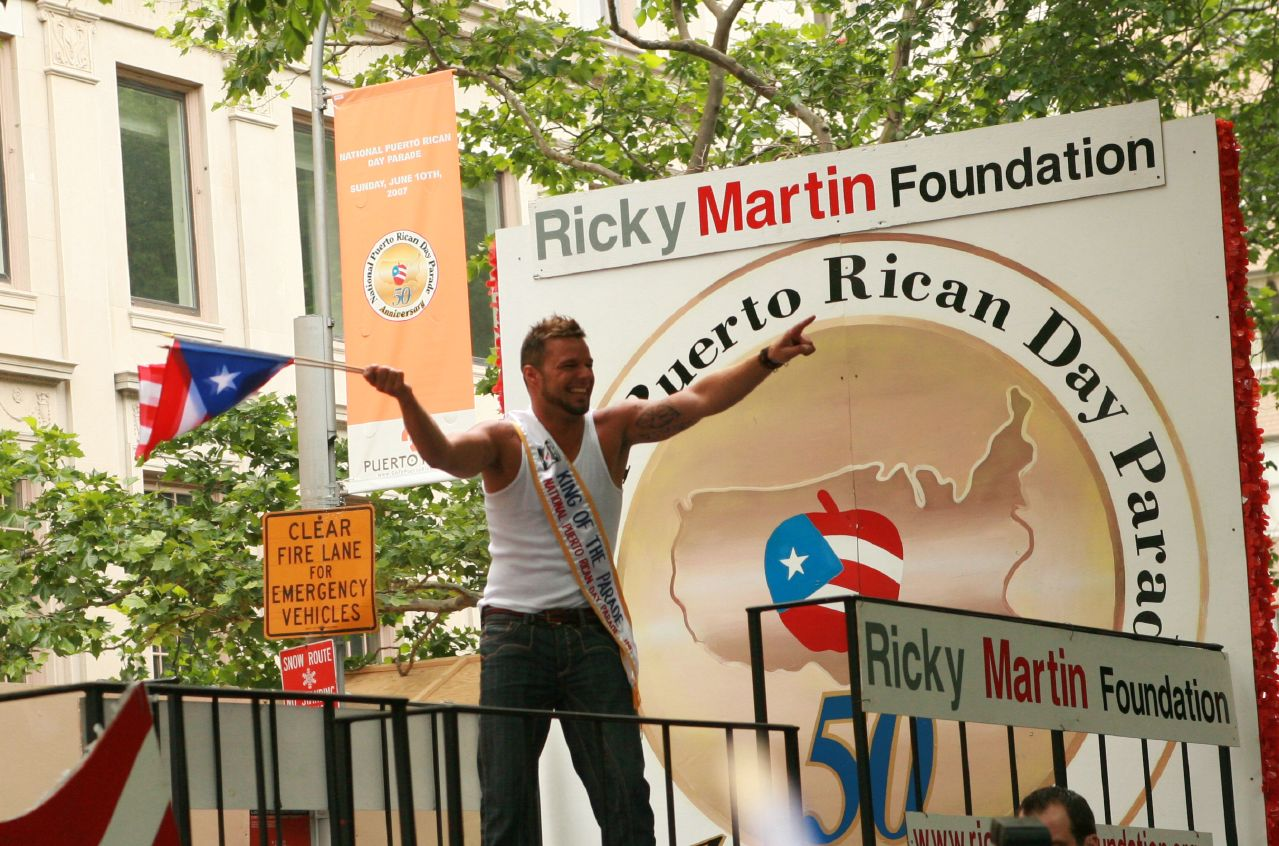
Ricky Martin at the annual Puerto Rican parade in New York City

Operation Bootstrap ("Operación Manos a la Obra") is the name given to the ambitious projects that industrialized Puerto Rico in the mid-20th century that were engineered by Teodoro Moscoso. The attracted industry did not provide sufficient job opportunities. With increased population growth and displacement from traditional labor pursuits, the growing population could not be accommodated. Much of the surplus labor migrated to the United States. In 1948, Puerto Ricans elected their first governor Luis Muñoz Marín, who together with his government initiated a series of social and economic reforms with the introduction of new programs in the island. Some of those programs met some resistance from the American government and so the local government had some trouble implementing them. New York Mayor Robert F. Wagner, Jr. began a campaign to recruit Puerto Rican laborers in the island to work in the city's factories. Mayor Wagner figured that the city would benefit greatly by the luring of what was considered to be "cheap labor".

Discrimination was rampant in the United States, and it was no different in New York. As stated by Lolita Lebrón, there were signs in restaurants that read "No dogs or Puerto Ricans allowed." The Puerto Rican Nationalist Party established an office in New York in the 1950s and attracted many migrants. Leaders of the party conceived a plan that would involve an attack on the Blair House with the intention of assassinating United States President Harry S. Truman and an attack on the House of Representatives. Those events had a negative impact on the Puerto Rican migrants. Americans viewed Puerto Ricans as anti-Americans and the discrimination against them became even more widespread.

Many Puerto Ricans overcame those obstacles and became respected members of their communities. Many such as Antonia Pantoja, established organizations such as "ASPIRA," which helped their fellow countrymen to reach their goals.

In 1954, a group of politicians close to Carmine Gerard DeSapio, the leader of Tammany Hall, chose Tony Méndez to lead the eastern section of the district, known as the 14th Assembly District. He was chosen by the group, which was also known as the Democratic County Committee, because in those days there was no direct election of district leaders. Also, the influx of Puerto Ricans moving to the 14th Assembly District, in which East Harlem is located, replaced the members of the Italian Community who preceded them and eventually moved out. Méndez became the first native-born Puerto Rican to become a district leader of a major political party in New York City.

The first New York Puerto Rican Day Parade, founded by Tony Méndez was held on Sunday, April 13, 1958, in the "Barrio" in Manhattan. Its first President was Victor López and it was coordinated by José Caballero. The grand marshals were Oscar González Suarez and Tony Méndez Esq. Prominent personalities from Puerto Rico headed by then Governor Luis Muñoz Marín, attended the initial parade. The parade was organized as a show of Puerto Rican pride and is a tradition that continues today in New York City and has also extended to other cities such as Chicago, Illinois, and Orlando, Florida]. By 1960, the United States census showed that there were well over 600,000 New Yorkers of Puerto Rican birth or parentage. Estimates were that more than one million Puerto Ricans had migrated during that period.

== Nuyorican Movement ==
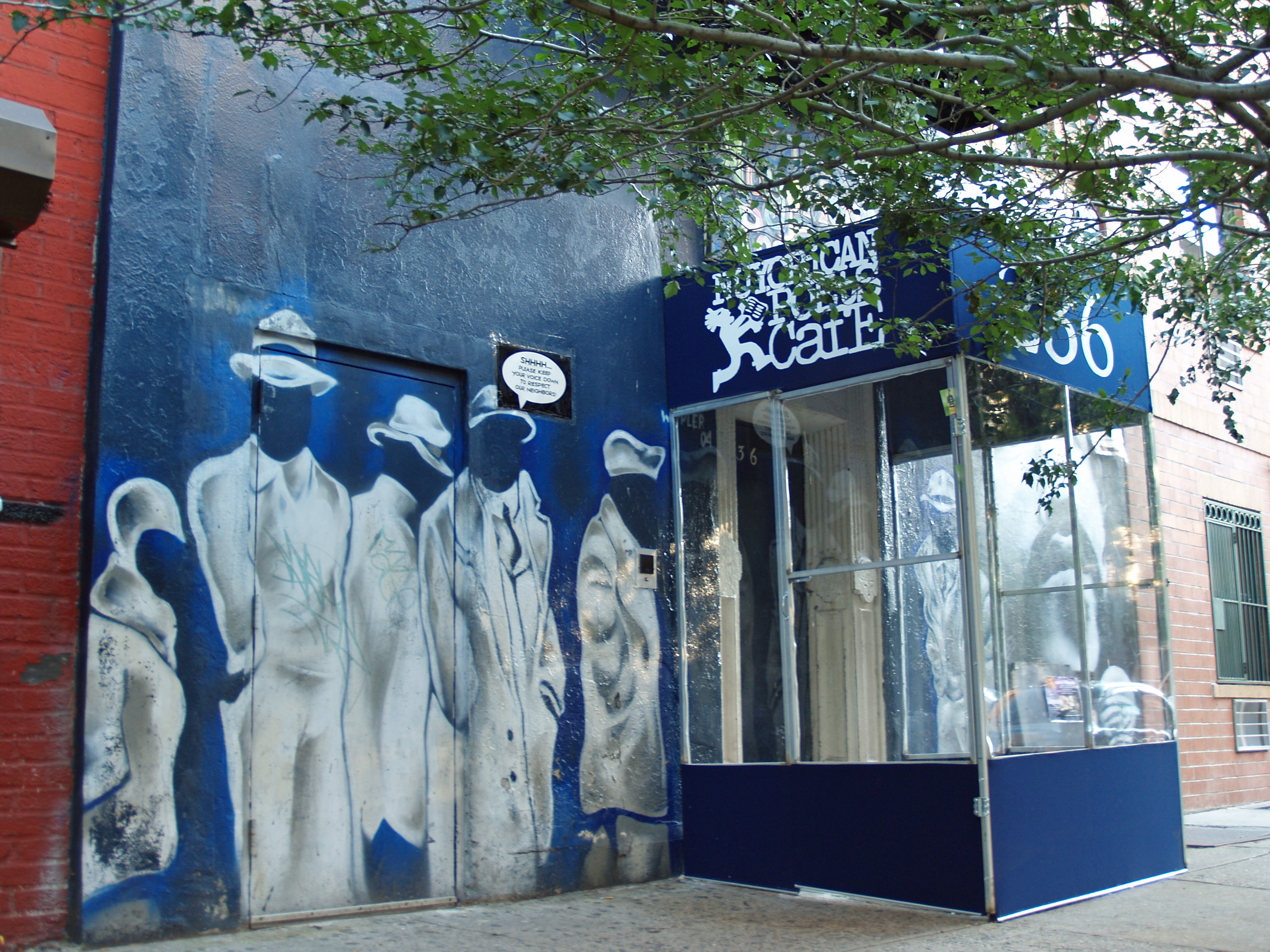
The Nuyorican Poets Café

Puerto Rican writer Jesús Colón founded an intellectual movement involving poets, writers, musicians, and artists who are Puerto Rican or of Puerto Rican descent and live in or near New York City; it became known as the Nuyorican Movement. The phenomenon of the "Nuyoricans" came about while many Puerto Ricans who migrated to New York City faced difficult situations and hardships, such as racial discrimination. Leading voices included Giannina Braschi, Sandra Maria Esteves, and Tato Laviera. A "Nuyorican" subculture developed. In 1980, Puerto Rican poets Miguel Algarín, Miguel Piñero and Pedro Pietri established the "Nuyorican Poets Café" on Manhattan's Lower East Side (236 E 3rd Street, between Avenues B and C), which is now considered a New York landmark.

== Late 20th century and early 21st century ==
Historical Puerto Rican population in New York City
Year	Pop.	±%
1910	554	—
1920	7,364	+1229.2%
1930	44,908	+509.8%
1940	61,463	+36.9%
1950	187,420	+204.9%
1960	612,574	+226.8%
1970	917,712	+49.8%
1980	860,552	−6.2%
1990	896,763	+4.2%
2000	789,172	−12.0%
2010	723,621	−8.3%
2020	595,535	−17.7%

By 1964, the Puerto Rican community made up 9.3 percent of the total New York City's population. The Puerto Rican migrants who gained economic success began to move away from the "Barrios" and settled in Westchester County, Staten Island, and Long Island or moved to other cities in other states like New Jersey (especially North Jersey, which is still a part of the New York city metropolitan area), Pennsylvania, Connecticut, and Florida, among others. New immigrants from the Dominican Republic, Mexico and South America moved into the barrios, which were once mainly occupied by the Puerto Ricans. The 1970s saw what became known as reverse-migration. Many Puerto Ricans returned to the island to buy homes and to invest in local businesses. Puerto Ricans have made many important contributions to the cultural and political spheres of New York and the society of the United States in general. They have contributed in the fields of entertainment, the arts, music, industry, science, politics, and military. Other Puerto Ricans have moved from New York to settle in smaller cities throughout the northeastern United States. For example, in 2009 Puerto Ricans alone made up 29.1% of Reading, Pennsylvania's population, which was over 53% Hispanic, and 25.0% of Lawrence, Massachusetts' population, which was over 70% Hispanic.

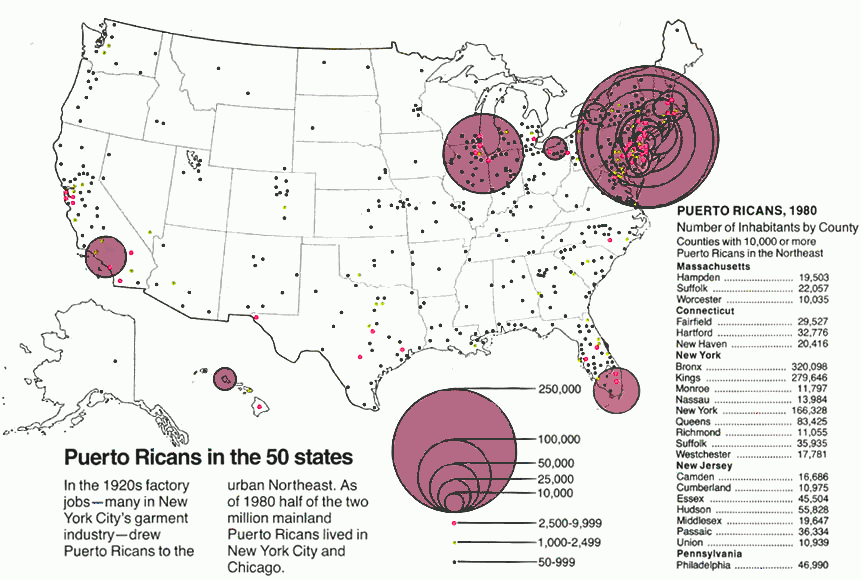
Chart reflecting Puerto Rican migration in the United States circa 1980s

However, starting in 2006 and extending into the early 2010s, there was a resurgence in migration from Puerto Rico to New York City and New Jersey, with an apparently multifactorial allure to Puerto Ricans, primarily for economic and cultural considerations. The Census estimate for the New York City, the city proper with the largest Puerto Rican population by a significant margin, has increased from 723,621 in 2010, to 730,848 in 2012; while New York State's Puerto Rican population was estimated to have increased from 1,070,558 in 2010, to 1,103,067 in 2013. Subsequent declines have been registered in Census results at the local and state levels.

New York State overall also resumed its net in-migration of Puerto Rican Americans for a brief period beginning in 2006, a dramatic reversal from being the only state to register a decrease in its Puerto Rican population between 1990 and 2000. While the Puerto Rican population of New York State remains the largest in the United States, U.S. Census Bureau results show that it decreased from 1,070,558 in 2010 to 1,000,674 in 2020. Growth and decline within this period was uneven: New York State is estimated to have gained more Puerto Rican migrants from Puerto Rico as well as from elsewhere on the mainland between 2006 and 2012 than any other state in absolute numbers, though gains appear to have been erased in the latter half of the decade. Also, unlike the initial pattern of migration several decades ago, the second Puerto Rican migration into New York and surrounding states increasingly involved the surrounding suburbs. The New York City Metropolitan Area was estimated to have gained the highest number of additional Puerto Rican Americans of any metropolitan area between 2010 and 2016, growing to 1,494,670 in 2016; however, that number declined to 1,072,950 in 2022, suggesting that many of those migrants did not permanently settle in the region.

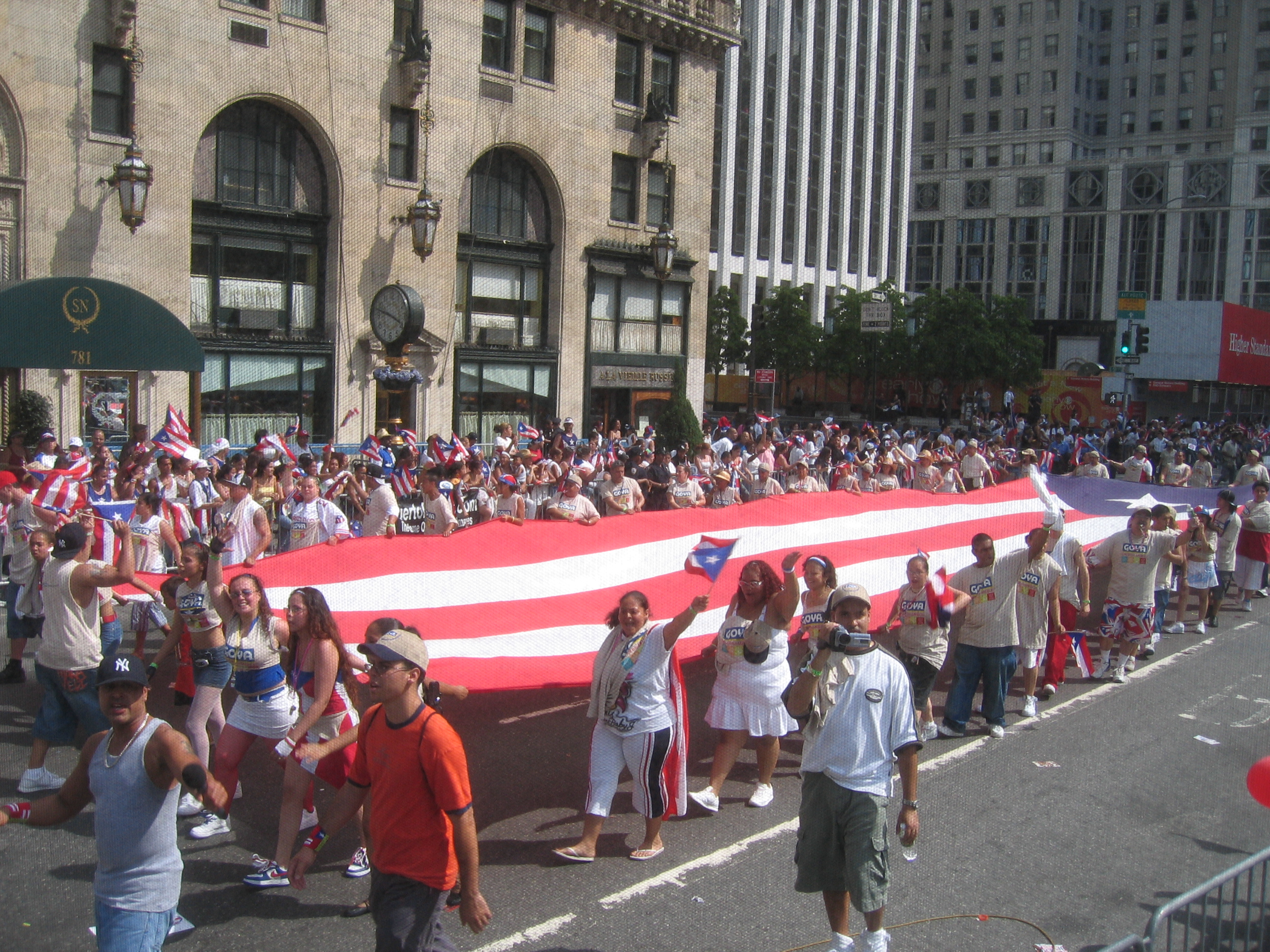
National Puerto Rican Parade in New York City, 2005

Northern New Jersey has also received a robust influx of Puerto Rican migration in the 21st century, given its proximity to both New York City's and Philadelphia's Puerto Rican establishments. Within the metropolitan area surrounding New York City, Paterson and Newark in New Jersey are important homes for Puerto Rican Americans. Jose "Joey" Torres was elected mayor of Paterson in 2014, where he had served two prior terms as mayor as well; while Luis A. Quintana, born in Añasco, Puerto Rico, was sworn in as Newark's first Latino mayor in November 2013, assuming the unexpired term of Cory Booker, who vacated the position to become a U.S. Senator from New Jersey. However, as Puerto Ricans continue to climb the socioeconomic ladder and to enter professional occupations in greater numbers, they are also purchasing homes in New Jersey's more affluent suburban towns. After Hurricane Maria struck Puerto Rico in September 2017, devastating the infrastructure of the island, New York State was expected to be the likeliest destination for Puerto Rican migrants to the mainland when premised upon family ties, with New Jersey being the third likeliest destination. The 5.6 million Puerto Ricans living stateside in 2017, were largely concentrated in Florida, NY and NJ; 20% in Florida, 20% in New York, and 8% in New Jersey.

2019 was the first time in 15 years when New York was not in the top ten destinations for people leaving Puerto Rico. In 2019, New York was ranked 11th, with Florida by far registering the largest share - more than 7 times as many Puerto Ricans arrived in Florida compared with New York that year.

Year	Puerto Rican ancestry population in New York City	% of NYC total population	% of NYC Hispanic population	% of total stateside Puerto Rican population
1940	61,463	0.9%	56%	87%
1950	187,420	2.3%	-	82%
1960	612,574	7.8%	-	68%
1970	917,712	11.6%	76%	65%
1980	860,552	12.1%	61%	42%
1990	896,763	12.2%	51%	32%
2000	789,172	9.8%	36%	23%
2010	723,621	8.9%	31%	15%
2020	595,535	6.7%	23%	10%

== Enclaves ==
Puerto Ricans are scattered throughout the city (though, other boroughs not to the degree as the Bronx), there are various neighborhoods with large Puerto Rican communities. Brooklyn has several neighborhoods with a Puerto Rican presence, and many of the ethnic Puerto Rican neighborhoods in Brooklyn formed before the Puerto Rican neighborhoods in the South Bronx because of the work demand in the Brooklyn Navy Yard in the 1940s and 50s. Bushwick has the highest concentration of Puerto Ricans in Brooklyn. Other neighborhoods with significant populations include Williamsburg, East New York, Brownsville, Coney Island, Red Hook, and Sunset Park. In Williamsburg; Graham Avenue is nicknamed "Avenue of Puerto Rico" because of the high density and strong ethnic enclave of Puerto Ricans who have been living in the neighborhood since the 1950s. The Puerto Rican Day Parade is also hosted on the avenue.

Ridgewood, Queens, also has a significant Puerto Rican population, as does the neighboring community of Bushwick, Brooklyn. The majority of Puerto Ricans in Queens are in Ridgewood.

Puerto Rican neighborhoods in Manhattan include Spanish Harlem and Loisaida. Spanish Harlem was "Italian Harlem" from the 1880s until the 1940s. By 1940, however, the name "Spanish Harlem" was becoming widespread, and by 1950, the area was predominately Puerto Rican and African American. Loisaida is an enclave east of Avenue A that originally comprised German, Jewish, Irish, and Italian working class residents who lived in tenements without running water; the German presence, already in decline, virtually ended after the General Slocum disaster in 1904. Since then, the community has become Puerto Rican and Latino in character, despite the "gentrification" that has affected the East Village and the Lower East Side since the late 20th century.

Staten Island has a fairly large Puerto Rican population along the North Shore, especially in the Mariners' Harbor, Arlington, Elm Park neighborhoods, where the population is in the 20% range.

Puerto Ricans are present in large numbers throughout the Bronx, which has the highest percentage of Puerto Ricans of any borough. In some places in the South Bronx, Spanish is the primary language. Throughout the 1970s, the South Bronx became known as the epitome of urban decay, but has since made a recovery. Although, Puerto Rican presence is widespread throughout the Bronx, the south central portions of the borough have the highest concentrations. Neighborhoods like Castle Hill, Clason Point, Soundview, Longwood, Hunts Point, and West Farms have some of the highest concentrations of Puerto Ricans in the New York metropolitan area. The Bronx currently has more Puerto Ricans than any other American county. In 2010, there were 298,921 Puerto Ricans in the Bronx, representing 21.6% of the borough and 41% of the New York City's Puerto Ricans, and between 1970-1990 the percentage Puerto Ricans made up of the Bronx was around 25-30%.

In New York and many other cities, Puerto Ricans usually live in close proximity with Dominicans and African Americans. High concentrations of Puerto Ricans are also present in numerous public housing developments throughout the city.

=== Puerto Rican population in New York ===
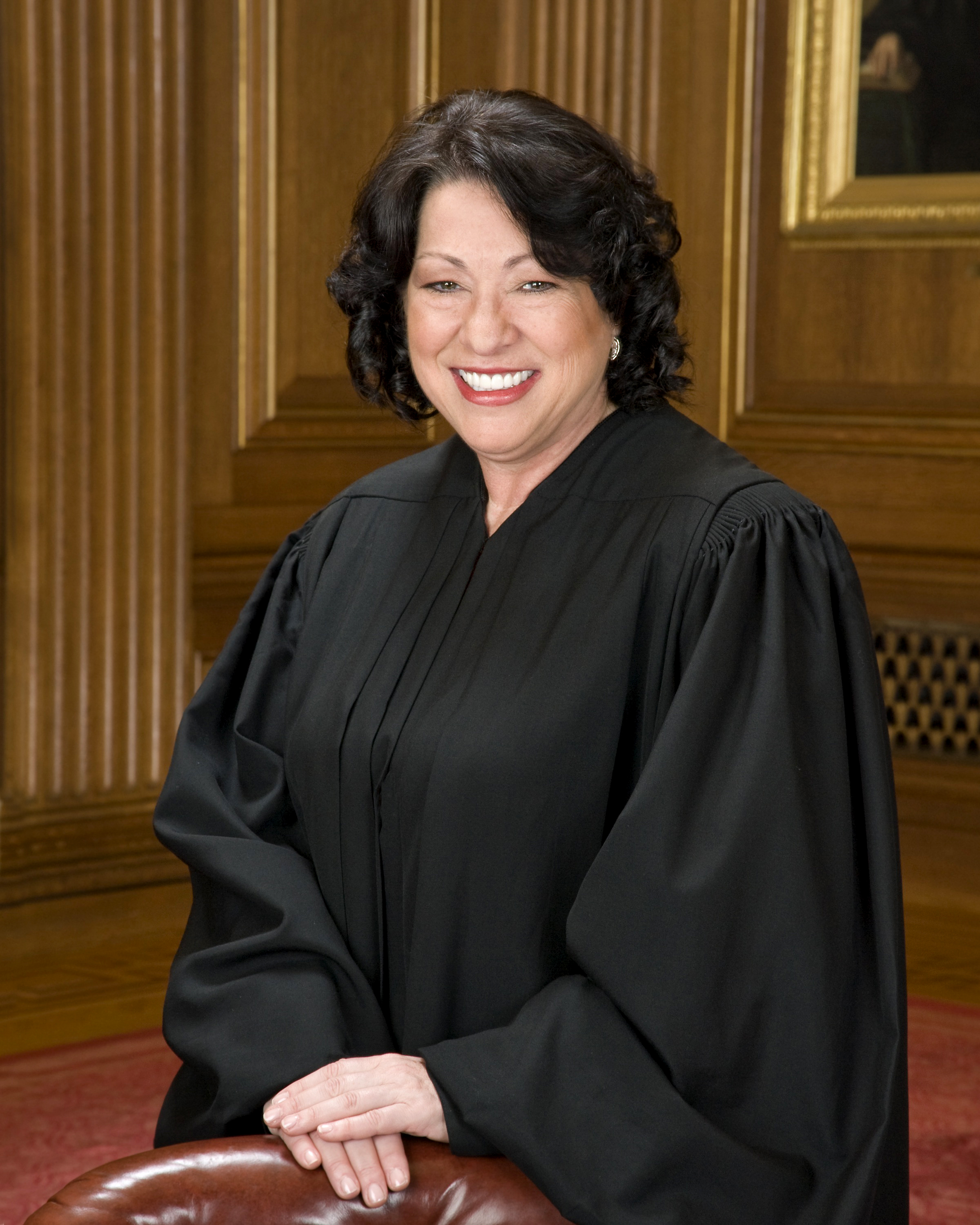
Sonia Sotomayor, born in the Bronx, Associate Justice of the United States Supreme Court

As of 1990, New Yorkers of Puerto Rican descent (Nuyoricans), numbered 143,974. Nearly 41,800 state residents (Nuyoricans) in 1990 had lived in Puerto Rico in 1985. According to the Census taken in the year 2000, Puerto Rican migrants made up 1.2% of the total population of the United States, with a population of well over 3 million Puerto Ricans (including those of Puerto Rican descent). If taken into account together with the almost 4 million Puerto Ricans who are U.S. citizens (nevertheless, excluded by the U.S. Census statistics of U.S. population), Puerto Ricans make up about 2.5% of the total population of U.S. citizens around the world (within and outside the U.S. mainland).

=== 2020 Puerto Rican population by borough ===
New York City's total Puerto Rican population was 595,535 and they represented 6.7% of the population. The Puerto Rican population and the percentage Puerto Ricans make up of each borough, as of the 2020 census, is:

- Bronx – 237,047 (16.1%)
- Brooklyn – 140,029 (5.1%)
- Manhattan – 91,274 (5.3%)
- Queens – 89,115 (3.7%)
- Staten Island – 38,070 (7.6%)

== Puerto Rican influence ==
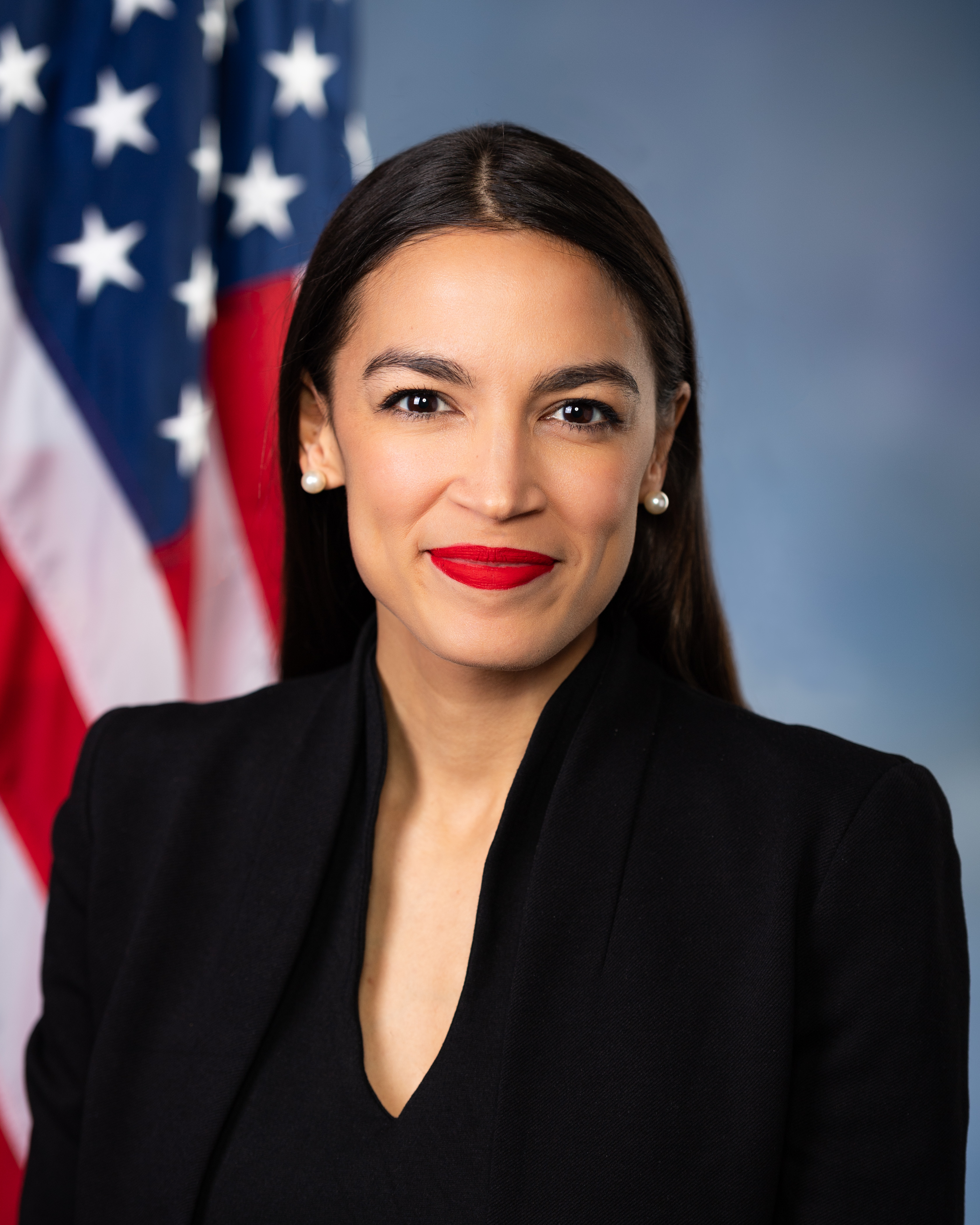
Alexandria Ocasio-Cortez, a Nuyorican representing parts of The Bronx and Queens in New York's 14th congressional district, is the youngest woman ever to be elected to Congress in November 2018.

In July 1930, Puerto Rico's Department of Labor established an employment service in New York City. The Migration Division (known as the "Commonwealth Office"), also part of Puerto Rico's Department of Labor, was created in 1948, and by the end of the 1950s, was operating in 115 cities and towns stateside. The Department of Puerto Rican Affairs in the United States was established in 1989 as a cabinet-level department in Puerto Rico. Currently, the Commonwealth operates the Puerto Rico Federal Affairs Administration, which is headquartered in Washington, D.C. and has 12 regional offices throughout the United States.

Puerto Ricans in New York have preserved their cultural heritage by being involved actively in the different political and social rights movements in the United States. They founded "Aspira", a leader in the field of education, in 1961. The ASPIRA Association is now one of the largest national Latino nonprofit organizations in the United States. Other educational and social organizations founded by Puerto Ricans in New York and elsewhere are the National Puerto Rican Coalition in Washington, DC, the National Puerto Rican Forum, the Puerto Rican Family Institute, Boricua College, the Center for Puerto Rican Studies of the City University of New York at Hunter College, the Puerto Rican Legal Defense and Education Fund, the National Conference of Puerto Rican Women, and the New York League of Puerto Rican Women, Inc., among others.

Hostos Community College in the Bronx, was named after a Puerto Rican Eugenio Maria de Hostos, and was founded as an all-Puerto Rican college. The college now accepts students of all races, however it largely caters to Hispanics with up to 80% of its students being of Hispanic descent. Boricua College is another originally all-Puerto Rican college with campuses in East Williamsburg and Manhattan.

Cultural ties between New York and Puerto Rico are strong. In September 2017, following the immense destruction wrought upon Puerto Rico by Hurricane Maria, New York Governor Andrew Cuomo led an aid delegation to San Juan, including engineers form the New York Power Authority to help restore Puerto Rico's electrical grid. Subsequently, on the one-year anniversary of the storm, in September 2018, Governor Cuomo announced plans for the official New York State memorial to honor the victims of Hurricane Maria, to be built in Battery Park City, Manhattan, citing the deep cultural connections shared between New Yorkers and Puerto Rican Americans. The Hurricane Maria Memorial was unveiled by Governor Cuomo on March 26, 2021 in lower Manhattan.

== Notable people who migrated to New York from Puerto Rico ==
The following is a short list of notable Puerto Ricans who migrated to New York:

- Aída Álvarez – former Small Business Administrator
- Juanita Arocho – political activist, journalist
- Ivonne Belen – movie director
- Herman Badillo – first Puerto Rican to serve in Congress
- Giannina Braschi – novelist and essayist
- Judge José A. Cabranes – U.S. circuit judge
- Hector Camacho – boxer
- Marta Casals Istomin – musician
- Oscar Collazo – Puerto Rican nationalist
- Jesús Colón – writer
- Míriam Colón – actress
- Rev. Nicky Cruz – minister
- Julia de Burgos – poet
- Nicholas Estavillo – the first Hispanic to become a three-star Chief in NYPD
- Angelo Falcón – political scientist
- José Ferrer – actor
- Oscar Garcia Rivera, Sr. – first Puerto Rican to hold public office in the mainland
- Isabel Gonzalez – paved the way for the Jones–Shafroth Act, which conferred United States citizenship on Puerto Rican citizens
- Maria Elena Holly – widow of "rock n roll" pioneer Buddy Holly
- Pedro J. Labarthe – poet, journalist, essayist, and novelist
- Héctor Lavoe – singer
- Lolita Lebrón – Puerto Rican nationalist
- Melissa Mark-Viverito – elected speaker of the New York City Council in January 2014
- Olga A. Méndez – New York state senator
- Tony Méndez – The first native-born Puerto Rican to become a district leader of a major political party in New York City
- Rita Moreno – actress
- Carlos Ortiz – boxer
- Adam Clayton Powell IV – N.Y. State Assembly member
- Herman Santiago – composer of "Why do Fools Fall in Love"
- Yolanda Serrano – HIV/AIDS activist
- Arturo Alfonso Schomburg – considered by many as the "Father of Black History"
- José Torres – boxer
- Nydia Velázquez – congresswoman
- Damian Priest – WWE superstar

== See also ==
- List of Puerto Ricans
- List of Stateside Puerto Ricans
- Puerto Ricans in the United States (Stateside Puerto Ricans)
- Nuyorican
- Nuyorican movement
- Nuyorican Poets Café
- Music of Puerto Rico
- Hispanics and Latinos in New Jersey
- Puerto Ricans in Philadelphia
