= Activist Women's Voices =

US oral history project

Coordinates: 40.74852°N 73.98361°W

- Housed at: Mina Rees Library, CUNY Graduate Center
- Website: Activist Women's Voices

The Activist Women's Voices collection is an oral history project of 35 women activists who worked in community-based organizations in the New York City area. The project covers the period from 1995 to 2000 and was a project of The City University of New York (CUNY) Graduate Center's Women's Studies Program and Center for the Study of Women. The digitized collection is made up of women from a diverse cross-section of cultural and ethnic social service organizations including activists from Arab-American, Haitian, Hispanic, African-American, and Asian-American communities. It is held at the Mina Rees Library, within the Graduate Center's B. Altman and Company Building.

== History ==
The project began in 1995 under the aegis of the City University of New York (CUNY) Graduate Center's Women's Studies Program and Center for the Study of Women and Society, initially as part of a graduate class "Women, Community, and Public Voice", in which Women's Studies Director Joyce Gelb and Deputy Director Patricia Laurence curated a list of oral history subjects: New York City-based women who were leaders in their communities. The specific focus was on unheralded women from a diverse cross-section of the five boroughs of New York. Although the project was based in the Women's Studies Program, the subjects were not specifically working in organizations that supported women. The focus was on the women leaders themselves. The last interviews were completed in 1998.

The scope of the project included compiling a list of oral history projects as well as a now-defunct searchable database of oral history collections.

=== Methods ===
Graduate students from different concentrations within CUNY Graduate Center completed weekly internships as part of their degree programs, working at the organization that was the focus of the oral history project. Through this process they identified and interviewed leaders in the organization in a fieldwork environment within the metropolitan area of New York City. After receiving training on conducting oral history interviews, the graduate students went into the field and interviewed their subjects.

The main focus of the interviews was on biographical experiences that shaped their community-based work, and on challenges, achievements, motivations, and methodologies used to effect changes within their communities. The project was categorized into a subject map.

=== Processing ===
In 2011, a finding aid was completed. In 2013, digitization of the 77 audio cassettes and 2,300 pages of interview transcripts was completed, with clips of some of the oral histories made available online in 2014. There were an additional 80+ press articles on subjects as well as various ephemera included in the collection. Under the guidance of the Chief Librarian, a Reference Librarian, and a Digital Services Librarian, two Special Collections Interns and a Special Collections Volunteer worked on the digitization team portion of the project.

=== Funding ===
The Activist Women's Voices oral history project was funded by the following organizations:

- American Association of University Women
- AT&T
- Ford Foundation
- Ms. Foundation for Education and Communication
- New York Council for the Humanities
- Rockefeller Foundation

== Collection ==
The project included 26 separate activists and three organizations, who each had individual interview subjects. The total number of interviews digitized was 35. The timeframe of the project was 1995–2000. Subject areas are listed below in parentheses. The collection is unique in the diversity of subjects of the oral history interviews and the wide range of subjects covered.

=== Activists ===
- Marilyn B: Community Education Coordinator, Family Violence Project at the Urban Justice Center (domestic violence)
- Carole Byard: Board Member, Coast to Coast Women of Color (arts)
- Alice Cardona: 100 Puerto Rican Women and Puerto Rican Association for Community Affairs (education, bilingualism, women’s leadership)
- Alisa Del Tufo: Director, Family Violence Project at the Urban Justice Center (domestic violence) - clip
- Bhairavi Desai: Executive Director, New York Taxi Worker Alliance (labor organizing)
- Barbara Dobkin: Founder and Chair, May’an, Jewish Women’s Project (Jewish women’s community project) - clip
- Essie Duggan: Core Member, Wayside Baptist Church (religious outreach and training for girls)
- Annie Ellman: Director and Founder, The Center for Anti-Violence Education (support and self-defense training for women) - clip
- Miriam Gittleson: Director of Cultural Activities, Greater New York CIO (labor organizing)
- Emira Habiby Browne: Director, Arab-American Family Support Center (immigration, education, domestic violence)
- Ann Henderson: Director of Cooperative Development, Urban Homesteading Assistance Board (housing, tenant education and management)
- Maria Hernandez: Founding Member, Park Slope Women’s Center, AIDS Counseling and Education (women in and returning from prison)
- Nancy Kyriacou: Organizer and Administrator, Housing Conservation Coordinators (neighborhood development and prevention of homelessness)
- Joan Maynard: Executive Director, Weeksville Society (historic museum for the preservation of African-American culture and heritage)
- Maria Peralta: Associate Director, Bread and Roses (cultural project of Local 1199, Health Care Workers’ Union)
- Lola Poisson: Director, Haitian Community Health and Referral Center (mental health and community service center)
- Rachel Fruchter: Physician and Women’s Health Activist, Haitian Community Health and Referral Center (mental health and community service center) - clip
- Lillian Roberts: Associate Director, New York State Commissioner of Labor DC 37 (public employee organizing)
- Rosalba Rolon: Founder and Artistic Director, Pregones Theater (arts and culture, theater)
- Marie Runyon: Director, Harlem Restoration Project (housing, jobs, and assistance to women returning from prison)
- Iesha Sekou: Education Coordinator, BEGIN Project of Literacy Partners (education for employment)
- Peggy Shepard: Director, West Harlem Environmental Action Committee (environmental justice and racism) – clip
- Norma Stanton: President and Founder, HACER (job training, concerns of Hispanic women)
- Evelyn Sumpter: Director, Family Services Network (health and human services)
- Sandy Warshaw: Founder, Older Women’s League (concerns of aging women) - clip
- Debra Zimmerman: Executive Director, Women Make Movies (arts and culture, media, film) – clip

=== Organizations ===
- Community Voices Heard (welfare reform)
  - Gail Aska, Core Member
  - Bessie Moore: Core Member - clip
  - Kim Statuto: Core Member
  - Sheila Stowell: Organizer
- Hunger Action Network of New York State, affiliate of Community Voices Heard (welfare reform)
  - Paul Getsos: Director
- Lesbian Herstory Archives (collection of lesbian-related materials)
  - Deborah Edel: Co-Founder - clip
  - Polly Thistlewaite: Coordinator - clip
- Maura Clarke-Ita Ford Center (community-based education)
  - Sr. Mary Burns: Founder and Co-Director
  - Alberta Williams
