= Antonia Pantoja =

Puerto Rican educator

- Pantoja in 1996
- Born: September 13, 1922; Puerta de Tierra, San Juan, Puerto Rico
- Died: May 24, 2002 (aged 79); Manhattan, New York
- Education: Hunter College Columbia School of Social Work Union Graduate School
- Occupations: Social worker, educator, civil rights activist
- Organization: ASPIRA
- Partner: Wilhemina Perry
- Awards: Presidential Medal of Freedom

Antonia Pantoja (September 13, 1922 – May 24, 2002), was a Puerto Rican educator, social worker, feminist, civil rights leader and the founder of ASPIRA, the Puerto Rican Forum, Boricua College and Producir. In 1996, she was the first Puerto Rican woman to receive the American Presidential Medal of Freedom.

== Early life and education ==
Pantoja was born in Puerta de Tierra, in San Juan, Puerto Rico on September 13, 1922 into a poor family of laundry and tobacco workers. She was raised by her mother, Alejandrina Pantoja Acosta, and her grandparents, Conrado Pantoja Santos and Luisa Acosta Rivera; her later activism was influenced by her grandfather, who was a labor organizer at a factory of the American Tobacco Company. At a young age, Pantoja developed asthma, which would affect her for the rest of her life; she also contracted tuberculosis during her first year of high school and spent three months recovering in a sanatorium. Her family was also affected by the 1928 Ockeechobee hurricane.

She graduated from Central High School in Santurce in 1940, and was able to study at the University of Puerto Rico at Río Pedras through financial assistance from wealthy neighbors. She received a teaching certificate in 1942 and taught for two years at rural schools in Cuchilla and Toa Alta, where she developed a passion for education and supporting disadvantaged students.

In 1944, Pantoja moved to New York City as a part of a major wave of Puerto Rican migration during World War II, and to relieve herself of the burden of providing for her mother and siblings. She found work as a wartime welder in a radio factory, then in factory making lamps, where she helped unionize the workers in her factory. While working at the factory, Pantoja met Reba Josephs, who helped introduce her to a wide range of New York artists, writers, and intellectuals; she became enmeshed in this community while living in a communal house in Greenwich Village.

Pantoja attended Hunter College on a scholarship, and graduated with a bachelor's degree in sociology in 1952. She then attended the Columbia School of Social Work on scholarships from the Mary Antoinette Cannon Foundation and the John Hay Whitney Foundation, graduating with her master's degree in social work in 1954.

In 1973, she earned her Ph.D. from Union Graduate School (now Union Institute & University) in Cincinnati, Ohio.

== Social work and early activism ==
In the early 1950s, while living on the Lower East Side with her then-partner, Helen Lehew, Pantoja began a job as a youth worker at a community center on 110th Street, where she was able to engage with the local Puerto Rican community. At Hunter College, she was able to further connect with like-minded Puerto Ricans, and met frequently with other students as well as employees of the Migration Division of the Department of Labor of Puerto Rico to discuss the problems facing their community, like the lack of access to education, health care, and stable employment.

In 1953, Pantoja helped formalize this group into the Hispanic Youth Adult Association, which would later be renamed the Puerto Rican Association for Community Affairs. The organization focused on community-oriented projects, such as refurbishing churches, helping register voters, and planning the first Puerto Rican Youth Conference. Community figures like Josephine Nieves, Yolanda Sánchez, Luis Nuñez, and Alice Cardona were early members of the group.

After graduating from Columbia, Pantoja worked briefly as a social worker at the Union Settlement House, but she felt more drawn to the development of social policies that could enact greater change. Though she was offered a Fulbright scholarship to study at the London School of Economics, she declined and instead took a job with the newly established Commission on Intergroup Relations, led by Frank Smith Horne.

Through her work on the Commission, Pantoja founded the Puerto Rican Forum, which served as an incubator for organizations and programs promoting economic self-sufficiency. This organization is now known as the National Puerto Rican Forum and its headquarters are in The Bronx.

== ASPIRA ==
In 1961, Pantoja also founded ASPIRA (Spanish for "aspire"), a non-profit organization that promoted a positive self-image, commitment to community, and education as a value as part of the ASPIRA Process to Puerto Rican and other Latino youth in New York City. ASPIRA now has offices in six states, Puerto Rico and has its headquarters, the ASPIRA Association, in Washington, D.C.. It has provided approximately 50,000 Latino students with career and college counseling, financial aid and other assistance, and is today one of the largest nonprofit agencies in the Latino community. In 1963, Pantoja directed a project of the Puerto Rican Forum that resulted in the establishment of the Puerto Rican Community Development Project (PRCDP), funded by the federal War on Poverty.

== Reformation of New York's educational system ==
In 1964, Pantoja shifted her emphasis from self-help programs to the reformation of the educational system and in 1967 she served on a mayoral committee, convened by the then-Mayor of New York City, John Lindsay, that recommended the decentralization of the school system.

In 1970, she established the Universidad Boricua, which is now known as Boricua College (with three campuses in NYC) and the Puerto Rican Research and Resources Center in Washington, D.C. In 1973, she earned her Ph.D. from Union Graduate School in Ohio. She joined the faculty of the San Diego State University's School of Social Work in 1978, where she became the Director of the Undergraduate Program in Social Work. Later, she would become the co-founder of the Graduate School for Community Development, a private free-standing educational institution. This school taught community development, economic development and leadership skills to people in communities around the United States and Puerto Rico.

In 1972, ASPIRA of New York, under the direction of Dr. Mario Anglada and with the support of Pantoja, filed a civil rights lawsuit in the Federal court demanding that New York City provide classroom instruction in transitional Spanish for struggling Latino students. ASPIRA signed a consent decree with the NYC Board of Education in 1974, which is considered a major landmark in the history of bilingual education in the United States. Although Pantoja is credited with bringing this landmark lawsuit, she was actually no longer with ASPIRA at the time and was not directly involved.

== Awards and recognitions ==
Awarded the Presidential Medal of Freedom in 1996

Among Pantoja's numerous awards and recognitions are the following:

- Inducted into the Hunter College Hall of Fame
- The Hispanic Heritage Award
- The Julia de Burgos Award of la Casa Cultural of Yale University
- A Doctor of Letters Honorary degree from the University of Connecticut
- A Doctor Honoris Causa from the University of Massachusetts Amherst
- A Doctor Honoris Causa from the University of Puerto Rico
- The Hunter College Professional Achievement Award
- The Lifetime Achievement Award from the New York State Board of Regents

In 1996, President Bill Clinton presented her with the Presidential Medal of Freedom, the first Puerto Rican woman to receive such this honor.

In 2012, she was inducted into the Legacy Walk, an outdoor public display which celebrates LGBT history and people.

In 2015, she was named by Equality Forum as one of their 31 Icons of the 2015 LGBT History Month.

== Later years ==
After 1984, Pantoja moved to Puerto Rico for health reasons, where she established Producir, an organization which provides economic assistance to small businesses, and Provivienda, which works to develop housing for the needy. In 1998 she returned to New York, concluding that she was clearly now a Nuyorican, given her negative personal experiences in Puerto Rico.

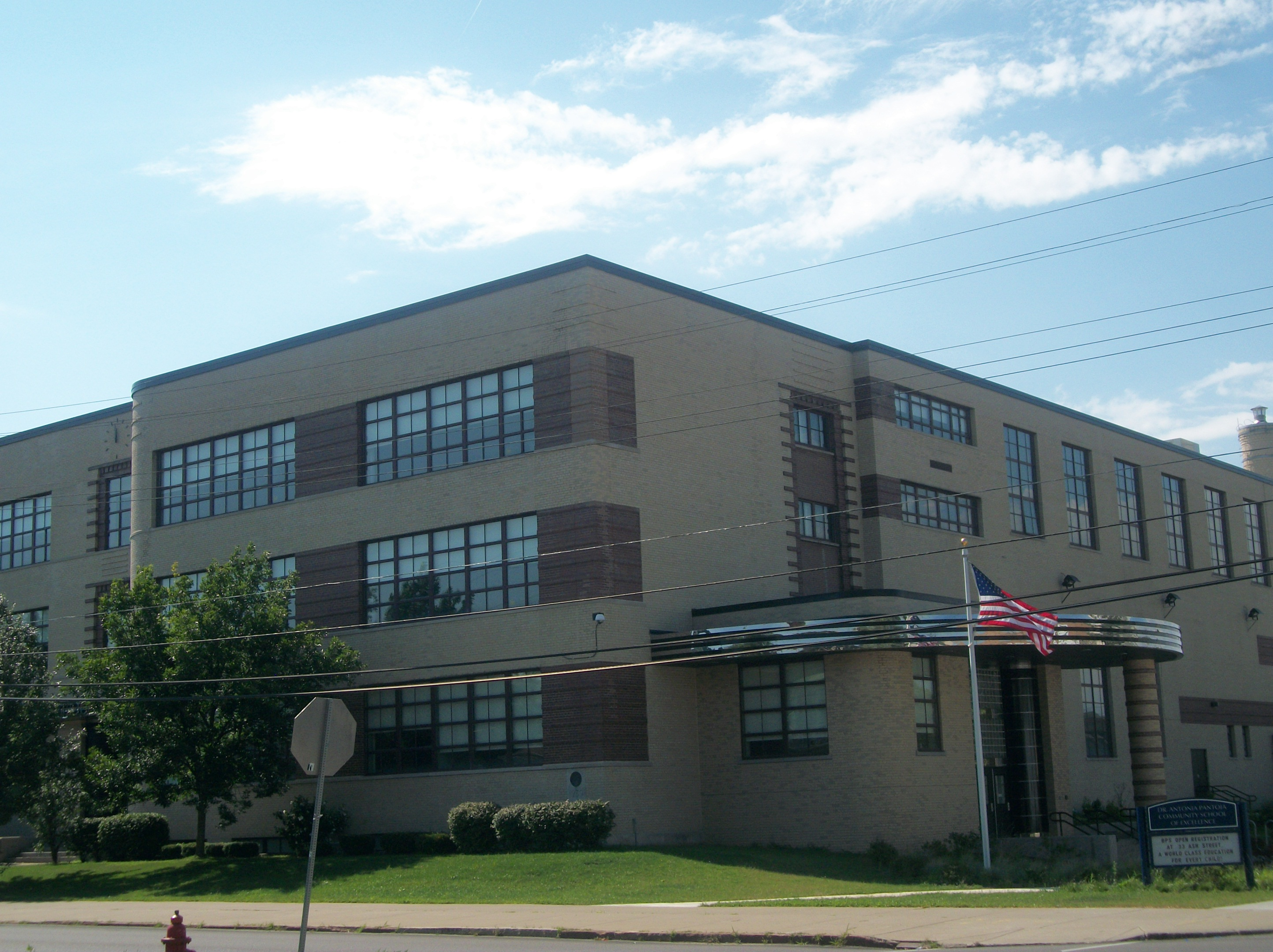
PS 18 in Buffalo, New York, named in honor of Antonia Pantoja.

In 2002, Pantoja published her autobiography, Memoir of a Visionary: Antonia Pantoja. In her memoirs she alluded to being a lesbian and discussed her decision not to go public before then with her sexual orientation.

Dr. Antonia Pantoja died of cancer in Manhattan, New York on May 24, 2002. She was survived by her longtime partner, Dr. Wilhelmina Perry. Filmmaker Lillian Jimenez of the Latino Educational Media Center in New York City worked on a documentary on the life of Pantoja.

Sometime around 2003-2004, a branch of the Buffalo Public Schools, PS 18, was renamed after Pantoja.

== Written works ==
- "Memoir of a Visionary: Antonia Pantoja", Houston: Arte Publico Press, 2002
- "Puerto Ricans in New York: A Historical and Community Development Perspective", Centro: Journal, Vol. 2, No. 5, Spring 1989, pp. 21–31
- "A Guide for Action in Intergroup Relations", Social Group Work: Selected Papers from the National Conference on Social Welfare, 1961
- "A Third World Perspective: A New Paradigm for Social Science Research", Research: A Third World Perspective, Western Interstate Commission for Higher Education, 1967, pp. 1–17
- "Community Development and Restoration: A Perspective and Case Study", Community Organizing in a Diverse Society. Edited by John L. Erlich and Felix G. Rivera. Boston: Allyn and Bacon, 1998., pp. 220–242
- "Cultural Pluralism, A Goal to be Realized", Voices from the Battlefront: Achieving Cultural Equity. Edited by Marta Moreno Vega and Cheryll Greene. New Jersey: Africa World Press Inc., 1993, pp. 135–48
- "Social Work in a Culturally Pluralistic Society: An Alternative Paradigm", Cross-Cultural Perspectives in Social Work Practice. Houston: University of Houston, 1976, pp. 79–95
- "The University: An Institution for Community Development", Coming Home: Community-based Education and the Development of Communities. Washington, D.C.: Clearing House for Community-based, Free-standing Educational Institutions, 1979, pp. 28–33
- "Toward the Development of Theory: Cultural Pluralism Redefined", Journal of Sociology and Social Welfare IV, 1976, pp. 125–46

== Notable ASPIRA alumni ==
Among the ASPIRA of New York's prominent graduates (known as "Aspirantes") are:

- Fernando Ferrer, former Bronx president, who ran for NYC Mayor in 2001 and 2005 unsuccessfully;
- Angelo Falcón, prominent political scientist and President of the National Institute for Latino Policy (formerly the Institute for Puerto Rican Policy);
- Anthony Romero, executive director of the American Civil Liberties Union;
- Ninfa Segarra, former President of the Board of Education of New York, former Deputy Mayor under Mayor Rudolph Giuliani, and she is currently a lobbyist with Toñio Burgos & Associates and is President of the National Puerto Rican Coalition in Washington, D.C.;
- Aída Álvarez, former director of the Small Business Administration under President Bill Clinton;
- Nelson Diaz, first Puerto Rican Solicitor General in Philadelphia;
- Jimmy Smits, Puerto Rican actor.
- Luis Guzmán, character actor
- Dr. Isaura Santiago Santiago (Ph.D., Fordham University), first tenured Puerto Rican woman at Columbia University and first Puerto Rican woman president of Hostos Community College of the City University of New York
- Digna Sanchez, who led such organizations as the Puerto Rican Socialist Party (PSP), MADRE and Learning Leaders in New York City; she also worked at the Puerto Rican Legal Defense Fund, the United Way of New York City, and the Children's Television Workshop.

== See also ==
- List of Puerto Ricans
- List of Puerto Rican Presidential Medal of Freedom recipients
- History of women in Puerto Rico
