= National Hispanic Media Coalition =

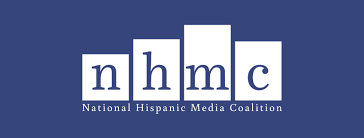
- Founded: 1986
- Founder: Armando Durón, Esther Renteria, and Alex Nogales
- Type: Media Advocacy & Civil Rights Organization
- Purpose: Eliminate hate, discrimination, and racism towards the Latino community.
- Headquarters: Los Angeles, California, U.S.
- Locations: Los Angeles, California; Washington, D.C.
- Region served: United States
- President and CEO: Brenda Victoria Castillo
- Website: https://www.nhmc.org/

The National Hispanic Media Coalition (NHMC) is a nonprofit 501(c)(3) civil rights organization active in the United States that was founded to eliminate hate, discrimination, and racism towards the Latino community.

NHMC collaborates with other social justice organizations to eliminate online hate and hold online platforms accountable for their content. They advocate for the Lifeline Program, net neutrality protections, and also work in closing the digital divide for Latinos and other marginalized communities. NHMC works in partnership with other civil rights organizations to safeguard democracy in the United States.

== Ongoing advocacy goals ==
NHMC is a media advocacy and civil-rights organization for the advancement of Latinos, advocating for inclusiveness, balanced media portrayals, and universal, affordable, and open access to communications.

== Partner Coalitions ==
It serves as the Secretariat of the National Latino Media Council which encompasses the 10 largest Latino civil rights and advocacy organizations in the country including:

- Hispanic Association of Colleges and Universities (HACU)
- LatinoJustice PRLDEF
- League of United Latin American Citizens (LULAC)
- Latino Theater Company @ The Los Angeles Theatre Center
- Mexican American Legal Defense and Educational Fund (MALDEF)
- Mexican American Opportunity Foundation (MAOF)
- National Association of Latino Arts and Culture (NALAC)
- National Institute for Latino Policy (NiLP)

Created in 1999, NLMC is dedicated to increasing Latino employment in the media industry, at all levels both in front and behind the camera, do away with negative stereotypes, and advocate for media policy that benefits the Latino community. NLMC is also the organization that signed "Memoranda of Understanding" with ABC, CBS, NBC, and Fox therefore increasing the employment ranks of Latinos and other people of color at all four networks.

== NHMC Impact Awards Gala ==
The National Hispanic Media Coalition's annual Impact Awards Gala, held in Beverly Hills, California, has recognized those contributing to the positive portrayal of Latinos in Hollywood. Honorees include: Jaime Camil, Rey Mysterio, Karla Souza, Jorge R. Gutierrez, Demian Bichir, Diego Luna, Edward James Olmos, Aubrey Plaza, Zoe Saldaña, Eva Longoria, Robert Rodriguez, Jorge Ramos, Alejandro Gonzalez-Iñárritu, James Cameron, Benjamin Bratt, Danny Trejo, Gina Rodriguez, George Lopez, and Francia Raisa.
