= Cornelius v. NAACP Legal Defense Fund =

- Supreme Court of the United States

Argued 19 February, 1985 Decided 12 July, 1985
- Full case name: Cornelius v. NAACP Legal Defense and Educational Fund, Inc.
- Citations: 473 U.S. 788 (more)

Holding
- Excluding 'activist' organizations from those eligible to receive donations through the CFC system is not a violation of the First Amendment

Court membership
- Chief Justice Warren E. Burger Associate Justices William J. Brennan Jr. · Byron White; Thurgood Marshall · Harry Blackmun; Lewis F. Powell Jr. · William Rehnquist; John P. Stevens · Sandra Day O'Connor

Case opinions
- Majority: O'Connor, joined by Burger, White, Rehnquist
- Dissent: Blackmun, joined by Brennan
- Dissent: Stevens
- Marshall, Powell took no part in the consideration or decision of the case.

Cornelius v. NAACP Legal Defense Fund, 473 U.S. 788 (1985), was a United States Supreme Court case on the First Amendment and the Combined Federal Campaign (CFC). The court ruled that excluding 'activist' organizations from those eligible to receive donations through the CFC system is not a violation of the First Amendment.

== Background ==
=== Combined Federal Campaign ===
The Combined Federal Campaign (CFC) system, created by then President Dwight D. Eisenhower in 1957, allows employees of the federal government to donate money annually to a general fund which would be distributed to local organizations or to one organization in the program.

In 1982, then U.S. President Ronald Reagan amended the program to only include organization that “provide or support direct health and welfare services” and explicitly barred the inclusion of organizations that engage in “political activity or advocacy, lobbying, or litigation”. This excluded numerous legal defense funds from the program.

=== NAACP LDF and PRLDEF ===
In 1980, the NAACP Legal Defense and Educational Fund (NAACP LDF), which is wholly separate from the NAACP, and the Puerto Rican Legal Defense and Education Fund (PRLDEF), both civil rights organizations operating legal defense funds, attempted to participate in the CFC. They were denied by the Office of Personnel Management (OPM), resulting in three lawsuits, the third becoming Cornelius v. NAACP Legal Defense Fund.

Alongside the NAACP LDF and PRLDEF, the Sierra Club Legal Defense Fund, the Federally Employed Women Legal Defense and Education Fund, the Indian Law Resource Center, the Lawyers' Committee for Civil Rights under Law, and the Natural Resources Defense Council were respondents in the case.

== Lower courts ==
In NAACP Legal Defense & Education Fund, Inc. v. Campbell (1981), the first of the suits, the legal defense funds challenged the requirement of "direct services" on the basis that it violated the First Amendment and equal protection component of the Fifth Amendment. The U.S. District Court for D.C. ruled that the "direct services" requirement was too vague to meet the specificity requirement of the First amendment, but not ruling on the equal protection question. As a result of the ruling, the NAACP LDF and other legal defense funds were able to participate in the 1982 and 1983 CFC program and receive funds.
