= NILP =

NILP may refer to:

- National Institute for Latino Policy, USA
- Northern Ireland Labour Party, 1924–1987
- Labour Party of Northern Ireland, two parties, formed 1985 and 1998
