= Robert Garcia (New York politician) =

American politician (1933-2017)

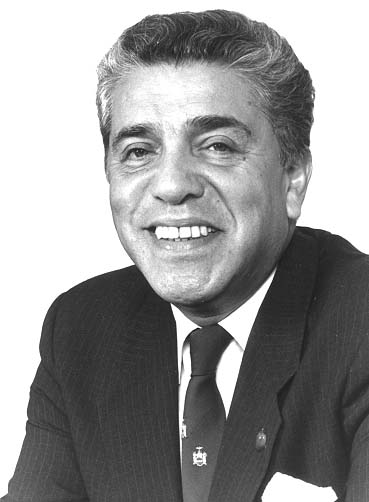

Member of the U.S. House of Representatives from New York
- In office February 21, 1978 – January 7, 1990
- Preceded by: Herman Badillo
- Succeeded by: José E. Serrano
- Constituency: 21st district (1978–83); 18th district (1983–90)

Member of the New York Senate
- In office April 17, 1967 – February 21, 1978
- Preceded by: Eugene Rodriguez
- Succeeded by: Olga A. Méndez
- Constituency: 29th district (1967–1972); 30th district (1973–1978)

Member of the New York Assembly
- In office January 1, 1966 – April 17, 1967
- Preceded by: Constituency established
- Succeeded by: Joseph Zaretzki
- Constituency: 83rd district (1966); 77th district (1967)

Personal details
- Born: January 9, 1933 New York City, New York, U.S.
- Died: January 25, 2017 (aged 84) San Juan, Puerto Rico
- Party: Democratic
- Education: City University of New York, City College (attended); RCA Institute (attended)

Military service
- Branch/service: United States Army
- Years of service: 1950–1953
- Rank: Corporal
- Battles/wars: Korean War

Robert Garcia (January 9, 1933 – January 25, 2017) was a United States representative from 1978 to 1990. He was elected to the New York State Assembly in 1965 and the New York State Senate in 1967, and then served in Congress from 1978 to 1990. From 1978 to 1982, he represented New York's 21st congressional district when that district was located in the Upper Manhattan and the South Bronx. From 1983 to 1990, he represented New York's 18th congressional district when that district was located in the Bronx.

== Early life ==
Garcia was born in The Bronx, New York, to parents who had migrated from Puerto Rico. His father was born in Spain, later immigrated to Puerto Rico, and worked at the Central Aguirre sugar mill on the island's southern coast. His mother was born and raised in Ponce.

As Spanish subjects residing in Puerto Rico in December 1898, his parents became U.S. nationals under the Treaty of Paris, which ended the Spanish–American War. Their continued residence on the island later made them U.S. citizens under the Jones Act of 1917. As a result, when they migrated from Puerto Rico to New York City in the 1920s, their ship bypassed Ellis Island and docked directly in Brooklyn.

=== Education and war service ===
Garcia attended New York City public schools and graduated from Haaren High School in Manhattan in 1950. He served in the United States Army from 1950 to 1953 during the Korean War, working as a radio operator with the Third Infantry Division. He received two Bronze Stars for his military service.

After leaving the Army, he continued his education between 1953 and 1957 at the City College of New York. He also attended the Community College of New York and the RCA Institute.

After graduation, Garcia worked as a computer engineer with IBM Control Data from 1957 to 1965.

== Public service career ==
Garcia's first experience in politics was circulating nominating petitions for John F. Kennedy's 1960 presidential bid, and he quickly became active in local politics along with Herman Badillo under the tutelage of Felipe Torres. Garcia was elected a Democratic member of the New York State Assembly in 1966 and 1967.

On March 28, 1967, he was elected to the New York State Senate, to fill the vacancy caused by the resignation of Eugene Rodriguez. He retained his seat in the Assembly until the end of the session of 1967. He took his seat in the State Senate at the beginning of the 1968 session and remained in the State Senate until 1978, serving in the 177th, 178th, 179th, 180th, 181st and 182nd New York State Legislature. In the Senate he was Deputy Minority Leader from 1975 to 1978. He was a delegate to the 1976 Democratic National Convention.

He took a keen interest in prison conditions at New York's correctional facilities. As a result, at the outbreak of the Attica Prison riot in early September 1971, he was asked by Republican Governor Nelson Rockefeller to serve on the Mediation Committee sent into the burning prison along with Badillo and others. 39 hostages and inmates were killed, and 89 others were wounded, when state troops stormed the prison.

=== Congress ===
A Democrat, Garcia nevertheless was first elected to Congress (95th United States Congress) from the Bronx on the Republican and Liberal tickets on February 14, 1978, to fill the vacancy caused by the resignation of Herman Badillo; He took his seat on February 21, 1978, as a Democrat, however, after being admitted to the Democratic Caucus in the House. He was re-elected to the 96th, 97th, 98th, 99th, 100th and 101st United States Congresses.

- Garcia was the official representative of the United States Congress to NATO, and was instrumental in developing better relations between Spain and Latin America and both the Carter and Reagan Administrations.
- He was instrumental in the release of DEA Agents being held by Cuba, meeting repeatedly over several days with then-president Fidel Castro.
- Garcia also had a prominent role in designation of the Martin Luther King National Holiday.
- He joined with Republican Congressman Jack Kemp to draft and pass the Kemp-Garcia Enterprise Zone law designed to create jobs in inner-city neighborhoods.
- As a member of the U.S. delegation celebrating the establishment of diplomatic relations with the People's Republic of China in 1979 he met with Chairman Deng Xiaoping and other Chinese leaders.
- Garcia was a pioneer in helping American Hispanics achieve political representation and benefits to which they were entitled due to their growing population. He convinced President Carter to include "Hispanic" as an option for the first time in the history of the U.S. Census in 1980.
- As the only Representative of Puerto Rican descent with a vote on the floor of Congress (Puerto Rico's Resident Commissioner could vote in committee, but not on the floor), Garcia was the de facto congressman representing 3.6 million U.S. citizens on the island-territory, and was often called upon to represent their interests in legislation before the House.

=== Legal investigation and resignation ===
Garcia remained in Congress until January 7, 1990, when he decided to resign following his trial on charges by U.S. Attorney Rudy Giuliani that he was linked to the Wedtech scandal.

== Wedtech conviction and exoneration ==
The overarching case that came to be known as the Wedtech Scandal stemmed from Bronx defense contractor Wedtech Corporation loans obtained from the Small Business Administration (SBA), a federal agency that was giving loans to minority-owned businesses in the 1980s. Wedtech had been founded by a Bronx native of Puerto Rican descent, John Mariotta, but one of his partners, Fred Neuberger, quietly acquired more than 50% ownership, which suddenly made the company ineligible for special SBA treatment and millions of dollars in government contracts. Wedtech continued to claim it was minority-owned anyway.

Federal investigations mushroomed into something much larger that would end up implicating more than twenty people, both in government and in business. Garcia was convicted of extortion, but his conviction was reversed by the Appellate Court.

== Later life and death ==
Following the reversal of his conviction, Garcia joined Charles Colson's "Prison Fellowship" program, which he developed to minister to those in prison. Both Garcia's father and sister, Aimee, had become pastors in the Pentecostal Church, and Garcia worked with Colson for a time. He continued to consult for public and private-sector clients in the mainland United States and Puerto Rico and continued to do so with Garcia Associates.

Garcia died from an infection due to his emphysema on January 25, 2017, in San Juan, Puerto Rico, sixteen days after his 84th birthday. He was buried at the Arlington National Cemetery.

== Honors and recognitions ==
In addition to the many awards bestowed on him while in elected public service, former Congressman Garcia is increasingly being recognized for his pioneering role in black and Hispanic politics, with organizations such as the Congressional Hispanic Caucus Institute, the New York State Assembly and Senate and the National Association of Latino Elected Officials (NALEO) honoring him at gala events in 2015 and 2016.

== See also ==
- List of American federal politicians convicted of crimes
- List of federal political scandals in the United States
- List of Hispanic and Latino Americans in the United States Congress
- Nuyorican
- Puerto Ricans in New York City

U.S. House of Representatives
Preceded by Herman Badillo	Member of the U.S. House of Representatives from New York's 21st congressional district 1978–1983	Succeeded by Hamilton Fish IV
Preceded by Edward R. Roybal	Chair of the Congressional Hispanic Caucus; 1981–1984	Succeeded by Bill Richardson
Preceded by S. William Green	Member of the U.S. House of Representatives from New York's 18th congressional district 1983–1990	Succeeded by José E. Serrano
