= Hurricane Maria Memorial =

Memorial in New York City to honor the victims of Hurricane Maria

Coordinates: 40°43′06″N 74°00′54″W

The Hurricane Maria Memorial is a memorial in Battery Park City, Manhattan, New York City, to honor the victims of Hurricane Maria, which struck Puerto Rico on September 20, 2017.

== Background ==
Hurricane Maria was a Category 4 hurricane that went over the island of Puerto Rico on September 20, 2017. The actual number of victims has not been completely determined, though estimates are acknowledged to be over 3,000 people.

As New York City has a high number of people of Puerto Rican descent, it was decided a memorial should be dedicated in remembrance of those who died in the hurricane.

The Hurricane Maria Memorial was dedicated on March 26, 2021, by New York State Governor Andrew Cuomo.
