= Hispanic American Center for Economic Research =

American nonprofit organization

- Abbreviation: HACER
- Formation: 1996
- Type: Economic policy think tank
- Headquarters: Washington, DC, United States
- Chairman: Alejandro Chafuen
- Revenue: $59,250 (2015)
- Expenses: $54,209 (2015)
- Website: www.hacer.org

The Hispanic American Center for Economic Research (HACER) is a non-profit organization based in Washington, D.C., with a tax exemption status under section 501(c)(3) of the tax laws of the United States. HACER's mission is to promote the study of issues pertinent to the countries of Hispanic America as well as Hispanic Americans living in the United States, especially as they relate to the values of personal and economic liberty, limited government under the rule of law, and individual responsibility.

HACER does not accept government funding and is supported entirely through gifts from individuals, philanthropic foundations, and corporations.
