= Social media policy =

A social media policy is a policy which advises representatives of an organization on their use of social media.

In evaluating job candidates, social media content is a solid indicator of the person's interest, but not a measure of the person's performance or character. However, many employers have used this to determine candidate suitability.
