= Olga A. Méndez =

Puerto Rican politician

Olga Aran Méndez

Member of the New York State Senate from the 28th district
- In office January 1, 1993 – December 31, 2004
- Preceded by: Robert Garcia
- Succeeded by: José M. Serrano
- Constituency: 30th district (1978-1992); 28th district (1993-2004)

Personal details
- Born: Olga Aran; February 5, 1925 Mayagüez, Puerto Rico
- Died: July 29, 2009 (aged 84) East Harlem, New York City, New York
- Party: Democratic (1978 - 2002); Republican (December 2002 -2009)
- Education: University of Puerto Rico (BS); Teacher's College at Columbia University (M.Psych.); Doctoral Dissertation in Educational Psychology: Yeshiva University (Ph.D)
- Mendez's father-in-law, Antonio "Tony" Méndez was the first Puerto Rican district leader in Manhattan

Olga Aran Méndez (February 5, 1925 – July 29, 2009) was the first Puerto Rican woman elected to a state legislature in the United States mainland, when, in 1978, she became a member of the New York State Senate.

== Early years ==
Olga Aran Méndez was born in Mayagüez, Puerto Rico. One of eight children, she was raised on the island in a middle class and highly educated family. Her mother, Ursula Garcia Fernández (b. 1894), was heir to a substantial family fortune along with her three sisters; she died when Olga was nine years old. Olga's father, Gonzalo Aran Soler (d. 1948), was a Clerk of the Court. His family, the Arans, were among the first French families to immigrate to Puerto Rico in the 19th century.

In 1950, Méndez received a Bachelor of Science degree from the University of Puerto Rico, afterwards teaching high school chemistry on the island. In 1960, she earned her Master's Degree in Psychology from the Teacher's College at Columbia University. In 1975, she defended her Doctoral Dissertation in Educational Psychology and received her Ph.D. from Yeshiva University.

Méndez married into a respected East Harlem political family. Her father-in-law, Antonio "Tony" Méndez was the first Puerto Rican district leader in Manhattan. She became involved in the fight for better government through her family members and became an active leader in the area of voter registration drives throughout the nation.

== Political career ==
In 1972, Méndez was elected as a New York Delegate, committed to Senator George McGovern at the Democratic National Convention. In 1974, she was elected to the "National Conference of Women" in Houston, Texas.

On April 11, 1978, she was elected to the New York State Senate, to fill the vacancy caused by the election of Robert García to the U.S. Congress. She was re-elected several times, and remained in the State Senate until 2004, sitting in the 182nd, 183rd, 184th, 185th, 186th, 187th, 188th, 189th, 190th, 191st, 192nd, 193rd, 194th and 195th New York State Legislatures. Méndez was a delegate to the 1980, 1984 and 1988 Democratic National Conventions.. Méndez was a delegate to the 1980, 1984 and 1988 Democratic National Conventions. In 1984, she was chosen as Secretary of the Senate Minority Conference. In 1993, Méndez became the first Puerto Rican woman to be chosen Chairperson of the Senate Minority Conference. At times, Méndez offered her political support to Republicans when doing so would have been beneficial to her district. She was often criticized by her peers for this bi-partisanship.

In December 2002, Méndez left the Democratic Party and joined the Republican Party, as she felt that "she and the voters had been taken for granted by the Democrats." Switching parties made re-election very tenuous in her heavily Democratic and majority-Hispanic district. On November 4, 2004, Méndez was heavily defeated by José M. Serrano, son of U.S. Congressman José E. Serrano, taking only 18 percent of the vote. During her final six months in office she served as the Chairwoman of the Senate Labor Committee.

== Death and legacy ==
Méndez was diagnosed with breast cancer in 1993 and underwent surgery. She said that she shared her story in order to educate others. She died after a 16-year battle at her East Harlem apartment on July 29, 2009, aged 84.

New York City's Mayor, Michael Bloomberg, an Independent, who was both a former Democrat and a former Republican, credited Méndez with impressing upon him the "importance of reaching across partisan lines to do what's right for your constituents." Bloomberg stated the following:

That's a lesson I carry with me every day, and one that's informed our administration's approach to everything we do, including the issues Olga focused on most acutely: educating our children, creating jobs, supporting small businesses, and developing affordable housing ... [D]iagnosed with cancer in the early 1990s, Olga didn't recoil from public life or attempt to hide her condition. Instead, she shared her story and her struggle with others. But Olga's legacy will live on with all New Yorkers who benefited from this incomparable woman, who courageously broke barriers and overcame obstacles in her way.

She was also named to the Civil Liberties Honor Roll. A public housing building which bears her name was constructed in Spanish Harlem in Manhattan.

== Legacy ==
Among the many awards and recognitions which Méndez was awarded were the following:

- the Operation Push National Citizenship Award,
- Effective Leadership Golden Age Award
- Hunter College Presidential Medal of Honor

She was also named to the Civil Liberties Honor Roll. A public housing building which bears her name was constructed in Spanish Harlem in Manhattan.

== See also ==
- List of Puerto Ricans
- History of women in Puerto Rico

New York State Senate
Preceded by Robert García	Member of the New York State Senate from the 30th district 1978–1992	Succeeded by Franz S. Leichter
Preceded by Franz S. Leichter	Member of the New York State Senate from the 28th district 1993–2004	Succeeded by José M. Serrano
Preceded by Guy J. Velella	Chairwoman of the New York State Senate Labor Committee; 2004	Succeeded by George D. Maziarz
