= Housing Conservation Coordinators =

Housing Conservation Coordinators (HCC) is a not-for-profit organization located at 777 Tenth Avenue in Hell's Kitchen, Manhattan, USA, that provides legal representation, engages in tenant and community organizing, installs energy efficient systems through their Weatherization Program and offers technical training.

== History ==
HCC was founded in 1972 at the time of New York City's financial crisis and assisted tenants of buildings abandoned by their landlords to buy their buildings — if the city had seized them for back taxes — under the Tenant Interim Lease Program. Such tenant-owned buildings were organized as low-income cooperatives called Housing Development Fund Corporations. When the city attempted to raise the purchase price they led the "$250 for Clinton and Chelsea Too" campaign There are more than seventy low-income cooperatives in Hell's Kitchen, purchased from the city after tax foreclosure or directly from the landlords with HCC loans.

HCC has had contact with tenants in roughly 90% of the buildings in Hell's Kitchen.

== Technical training ==
HCC training programs taught tenants how to operate and repair a boiler, enabling tenants of abandoned buildings to provide themselves their basic needs.

== Income limits ==
HCC can only represent tenant households with total combined incomes below specific amounts.

Size	Income limit
1	$38,000
2	$41,500
3	$44,000
4	$47,500
5	$51,000
