= Juanita Arocho =

Puerto Rican activist and journalist

- Born: 1910; Lares, Puerto Rico
- Died: August 22, 1998 (aged 87–88); Brooklyn, New York
- Occupations: Activist, journalist
- Known for: Puerto Rico independence activism
- Spouse: Homero Rosado

Juanita Arocho (1910–1998) was a Puerto Rico-born immigrant known for her community activism and journalism in East Harlem, also known as Spanish Harlem, in New York City.

== Life ==
Arocho was born in 1910 in Lares, Puerto Rico. She took the opportunity to migrate to the United States in 1933 aboard the U.S.S. San Jacinto with many others from the island who were seeking new opportunities in New York City. After arriving, she settled with her mother on 112th Street and 7th Avenue and quickly became politically active, both in her own community and in her homeland promoting the push for Puerto Rican independence.

Building on experience she gained from pursuing women’s right to vote in Puerto Rico, Arocho helped found the Casa Borinquen, La Asociación Cívica Lareña and the Comité de Manhattan del Partido Independentista Puertorriqueño, which she served as president. Starting in 1936, she worked as a political assistant for three terms to Congressman Vito Marcantonio, who represented her community in East Harlem. She was also an integral member of the Orden de la Estrella de Oriente, a local Puerto Rican Masonic Order, that became important in her personal life as well as her political activities.

As a journalist, Arocho wrote weekly newspaper columns that were published in a variety of Spanish-language periodicals. Her writings included comments on subjects ranging from the status of women in Puerto Rican communities to reporting on community events and writing editorials.

While she was engaged in political and community work, Arocho was influenced by other Puerto Rican activists including the poet Julia de Burgos, political leaders Pedro Albizu Campos and Gilberto Concepción de Gracia, political prisoner and nationalist Lolita Lebrón (who was also born in Lares), and political activists Erasmo and Emily Vando. Arocho's work with the activist Albizu Campos, who was president and spokesperson of the Puerto Rican Nationalist Party, was particularly notable because he was imprisoned several times, during which he relied on Arocho to "heighten the awareness of women’s issues in the independence movement."

In 1948, Arocho married fellow activist Homero Rosado who was also a force in independence efforts. The pair worked together to promote the empowerment of Puerto Ricans both on the island and in New York City. In 1959 they moved from Harlem to Brooklyn where they remained until their deaths. Rosado passed away there in 1994. Arocho died on August 22, 1998, in Brooklyn.

== CUNY collection ==
Archives from Arocho's life and work, covering the years 1940 to 1994, are held at the Puerto Rican Diaspora Centro de Estudios Puertorriqueños, Hunter College, CUNY. The Juanita Arocho Papers, the bulk of which are in Spanish, offer a glimpse into the community organizing efforts of Puerto Rican community members in Spanish Harlem with regard to the Puerto Rican independence movements both on the island and in the U.S. mainland. It also includes documents that concern Puerto Ricans, like Arocho, who participated in the Masonic Order.

The archived materials consist of "a small array of personal documents, correspondence, publications, clippings, Masons related materials, and organizational ephemera. In addition, the Papers contain a strong collection of photographs, particularly of Masonic activities."
