= Alice Cardona =

Puerto Rican activist and community organizer

Alice Cardona (March 17, 1930 – November 1, 2011) was an activist and community organizer.

The daughter of Puerto Rican parents, she was born in New York City and grew up in the Spanish Harlem neighborhood there. After completing high school, she worked in a store and volunteered with the Legión de Maria. In 1961, she joined a religious order based in Texas, the Sisters of St. John. However, she decided that the religious life was not for her and she left the order. She returned to New York City, where she worked for a financial institution and as a program coordinator for United Bronx Parents. In 1964, she became involved with the Head Start program. Between 1970 and 1978, Cardona worked for ASPIRA of New York, an educational service group, first as a counsellor and later as director for a counselling program. She returned to school and received a bachelor's degree from Goddard College in Plainfield, Vermont through an independent study program. She also was involved with the National Conference of Puerto Rican Women, serving on its national board, and co-founded HACER (Hispanic Advocacy and Community Empowerment through Research)/Hispanic Women's Center. She served on New York State Association for Bilingual Education (NYSABE)'s executive board from 1983 to 1984 and was representative to NYSABE from New York City from 1983 to 1986. From 1983 to 1995, she was assistant director of the New York State Division for Women.

Cardona formed the Hispanic AIDS forum in 1986; she also formed the Women and AIDS Research Network and the Women and AIDS project of the New York State Division for Women.

After retiring in 1995, she served as director for the Puerto Rican Association for Community Affairs and served on the boards of the National Women's Political Caucus, the National Association for Bilingual Education and the Puerto Rican Educators Association.

She was the author of Puerto Rican Women Achievers in New York City. In 1983, she received the Susan B. Anthony Prize from the National Organization for Women.

She died from cancer at the age of 81.
