= Tony Méndez =

District leader of the 14th Assembly District in New York City

District leader of the 14th Assembly District in New York City
- In office 1954–1974

Personal details
- Born: Antonio Méndez; February 5, 1902 Puerto Rico
- Died: January 8, 1982 (aged 79) Puerto Rico
- Party: Democratic
- Mendez's daughter-in-law, Olga Aran Méndez was the first Puerto Rican woman elected to a state legislature.

Tony Méndez (February 5, 1902 – January 8, 1982) was the first native-born Puerto Rican to become a district leader of a major political party in New York City.

== Early years ==
Méndez (birth name: Antonio Méndez) was born in Puerto Rico. In 1927, he moved to East Harlem in New York City where he established a jewelry store. Méndez married Isabel Negroni, native of Yabucoa, Puerto Rico, and with her had a son, Anthony.

== Political career ==
A wave of domestic migration from Puerto Rico to New York City came after World War II. Nearly 40,000 Puerto Ricans settled in New York City in 1946, and 58,500 in 1952–53. Many soldiers who returned after World War II made use of the GI Bill and went to college. Puerto Rican women confronted economic exploitation, discrimination, racism, and the insecurities inherent in the migration process on a daily basis, however they fared better than did men in the job market. The women left their homes for the factories in record numbers. By 1953, Puerto Rican migration to New York City reached its peak when 75,000 people left the island (Puerto Rico).

In 1954, a group of politicians close to Carmine Gerard DeSapio, then the leader of Tammany Hall, chose Méndez to lead the eastern section of the district, known as the 14th Assembly District. He was chosen by the group, which was also known as the Democratic County Committee, because in those days there was no direct election of district leaders. Plus, the influx of Puerto Ricans moving to the 14th Assembly District, in which East Harlem is located, replaced the members of the Italian-American Community who preceded them and eventually moved out.

Thus, Méndez became the first native-born Puerto Rican to become a district leader of a major political party in New York City. He played an instrumental role in convincing Puerto Ricans to become registered voters. Under the leadership of Méndez, the members of Tammany Hall's Democratic Party increased their political power in the district. He also consolidated his political influence and as such was able to hold the control of his office for many years.

== Personal ==
His son, Anthony, was a lawyer who was also active in politics. Anthony's wife Olga Aran Méndez (1925 – 2009) was the first Puerto Rican woman elected to a state legislature in the United States mainland when in 1978 she became a member of the New York State Senate. She served in said position until 2004. Anthony died in 1970.

His wife, Isabel, was also active in his political activities. She actively participated and played an instrumental role, along with her husband, in the founding of the first Catholic Church "La Milagrosa Church" in East Harlem. She was also the founder of the Puerto Rican Association of women voters. On January 21, 1997, Congressman Jose E. Serrano paid tribute to Isabel, who by then was the widow of Méndez, before the United States House of Representatives.

== Legacy ==
Among the contributions made by Méndez to the Puerto Rican community in New York was the founding of annual Puerto Rican Day Parade. He served as the gran marshal of the first parade which was held on April 13, 1958, in East Harlem in Manhattan.

Méndez retired from politics in 1974. In 1982, he was on vacation in Puerto Rico, when he suddenly died. His funeral was held in the Roman Catholic Church of the Holy Agony, located in Third Avenue and 101st Street in New York City.

An apartment complex located in New York's 13th Congressional District was named the "Tony Mendez Apartments" in his honor. The apartments are located in 75 East 116th Street.

== See also ==
- List of Puerto Ricans
