= LatinoJustice PRLDEF =

New York-based civil rights organization

- Founded: 1972
- Founder: Jorge Batista, Victor Marrero, Cesar A. Perales
- Purpose: Using law, advocacy and education to protect opportunities for all Latinos to succeed
- Location: Manhattan, New York
- Origins: Puerto Rican Legal Defense and Education Fund
- Key people: Juan Cartagena, President & General Counsel (2011–2021); Lourdes Rosado (2021–present)
- Website: http://www.latinojustice.org/

LatinoJustice PRLDEF, formerly the Puerto Rican Legal Defense and Education Fund, is a New York–based national civil rights organization with the goal of changing discriminatory practices via advocacy and litigation. Privately funded, nonprofit and nonpartisan, it is part of the umbrella Leadership Conference on Civil and Human Rights.

The Puerto Rican Legal Defense and Education Fund was founded in 1972 by three lawyers, one of whom, Cesar A. Perales, became the president of the group for much of its history. PRLDEF played a key role in the installation of bilingual education in New York City schools, and soon became the most important legal advocacy group for Puerto Ricans in the U.S. mainland. The group became known for the part it played in redistricting battles, for its opposition to civil service exams it thought discriminatory, and for its attempts to combat anti-Latino sentiment especially as arising from the debate over immigration to the U.S. It changed its name to the current one in 2008 in order to reflect demographic shifts in the Latino population in New York and elsewhere.

== Origins and the 1970s ==
The Puerto Rican Legal Defense and Education Fund was founded in 1972 as a non-profit organization by three lawyers, Jorge Batista, Victor Marrero, and Cesar A. Perales, with Perales the fund's first president. It was created as a privately funded, nonprofit and nonpartisan organization with the goal of changing discriminatory practices via advocacy and litigation. It was inspired in form and purpose by the high-profile NAACP Legal Defense and Educational Fund, which Thurgood Marshall had established in 1957. PRLDEF (pronounced "pearl-deaf") had $300,000 of initial funding from foundations, government sources, and private corporations. U.S. House of Representatives member Herman Badillo was on its first Board of Directors, and at the fund's initial press conference he said, "There is plenty of room for change in our society, and much can be done through the medium of class actions." The organization soon grew to have a Litigation Division, a Pro Bono Cooperating Counsel Division, and an Education Division. A typical staffer was a young, idealistic attorney from a premier law school.

The fund's first lawsuit was filed on behalf of the Hispanic educational improvement organization, ASPIRA of New York in an action against the New York City Board of Education. It led to the August 1974 ASPIRA Consent Decree, which established the right of city public school students with limited English proficiency to receive bilingual education. The decree was a key factor in bilingual education spreading throughout the city school system. It also brought about the publication of some federal and state forms in Spanish as well as English. By the late 1970s, PRLDEF had become the nation's most important legal advocacy group for Puerto Ricans in the mainland.

== 1980s and 1990s ==
In 1981, PRLDEF achieved its most visible early triumph when a federal court intervened to block a city Democratic Party primary election on the grounds that New York City Council boundaries diminished the power of minority voters. The council district lines were redrawn in consequence of the ruling. (A similar action was taken in 1991 to forestall a planned redrawing, and subsequent negotiations with the U.S. Justice Department resulted in changes to the redistricting.) Also in 1981, the fund began activity in opposition to reinstatement of the death penalty in New York State, with its board saying that "capital punishment is associated with evident racism in our society." The fund was also active in highlighting cases of police brutality.

During the 1980s, PRLDEF changed its focus somewhat, moving beyond traditional civil rights cases to address more economically focused issues such as wage disparities. A major target became civil service exams, which the fund believed were unfair to Latinos and other minority groups. In 1984, the fund sued the New York City Police Department, saying that its promotion exams discriminated against Latinos and African-Americans. The case was settled when the department agreed to promote an additional 100 black officers and 60 Latino officers to sergeant rank. The fund also filed separate suits against the New York City Fire Department and the New York City Department of Sanitation.

The fund actively opposed the 1987 Robert Bork Supreme Court nomination, "because of the threat he poses to the civil rights of the Latino community," and worked on joining anti-Bork coalitions. The same year, the fund teamed with community organizers ACORN on behalf of affordable housing for low-income Puerto Rican families in East New York. It also met with editors of the New York Daily News to complain about "negative images of Puerto Ricans presented by the News' staff," especially those coming from popular columnist Jimmy Breslin.

Future federal judge and U.S. Supreme Court nominee Sonia Sotomayor was an active member of the board of directors of PRLDEF from 1980 to 1992. Board members were often chosen for their wealth or their political connections and have included U.S. Attorney General Nicholas Katzenbach, Senator Jacob Javits, Ambassador William vanden Heuvel, Manhattan District Attorney Robert Morgenthau, New York State Attorney General Robert Abrams, and federal judge José A. Cabranes. Co-founder Victor Marrero became a federal judge and returned to serve on the board as well. The extent to which the board's Litigation Committee had control over which lawsuits went forward varied over time and was a subject of intermittent discussion.

The group endured financial strain several times, and in 1984, private contributions suffered due to a dispute between management and staff over control of the fund. Under president and general counsel Juan Figueroa, who joined the group in 1993, PRLDEF forged a strategic plan that led to an alliance with the Institute for Puerto Rican Policy in 1998. The Institute functioned as the Fund’s policy research arm. As a result, PRLDEF had an expanded role in the public policy community, a higher national profile, and an integrated program that effectively united grassroots advocacy, public policy and precedent-setting litigation. PRLDEF cases included language rights, education, voting rights and environmental justice.

== 2000s and a new name ==
The group's logo as of 2002

By 2003, the group was in severe financial crisis. Perales, who had since gone on to become a high-ranking official at the city, state, and federal levels, was brought back to serve as president. In 2005, the former Institute for Puerto Rican Policy split back off, renaming itself the National Institute for Latino Policy. PRLDEF itself was a member organization of the umbrella Leadership Conference on Civil and Human Rights.

In the 2000s, PRLDEF collaborated with the New York Legal Assistance Group, suing the United States Government for delays in the processing of immigration applications. PRLDEF was also known to collaborate with the Hispanic National Bar Association. After the town of Hazleton, Pennsylvania passed an ordinance to punish landlords who rented to illegal immigrants and businesses who hired illegal immigrants, the American Civil Liberties Union and the PRLDEF sued Hazleton, saying the law was unconstitutional. Perales said, "What [the ordinance] is about is an anti-Latino sentiment that has been growing in this country." On July 26, 2007, a federal court agreed and struck down the Hazleton ordinance; Hazleton's mayor promised to appeal the decision. The Hazleton challenge became PRLDEF's most visible work of that period. In July 2010, the group co-authored an amicus curiae brief filed by several Latino organizations that sought to block the highly controversial Arizona SB 1070 anti-illegal immigration law. The following month, PRLDEF said that was ready to sue the state of Virginia if its governor allowed the Virginia State Police to ask about the immigration status of individuals they stop or arrest, stating that such a policy would result in racial profiling.

In addition to its other efforts, the Education Division of PRLDEF encourages Latinos to become lawyers by offering LSAT prep courses, internships, and mentoring relationships. Those endeavors have assisted as many as 300 Latino and African-Americans students a year and helped create a generation of minority lawyers.

In October 2008, the group changed its name to LatinoJustice PRLDEF. Perales said that "there is a coming together of identification in a common struggle," especially in regards to immigration issues. But the change was also motivated by broad demographic shifts; when the organization had first been formed, Puerto Ricans comprised about 63 percent of the overall New York Latino population. This figure had now fallen to about 34 percent, and the group's clients were coming from Bolivia, Colombia, the Dominican Republic, Ecuador, Mexico, Peru, and the like. The move opened up additional fundraising opportunities, but also caused some Puerto Ricans to criticize the group for forsaking its heritage.

The organization received new national attention in mid-2009 with the Sonia Sotomayor Supreme Court nomination, with Republicans saying Sotomayor had been involved in a radical organization while Democrats defended it as a mainstream civil rights operation. Perales said, "You have a reputable group that has stood up for the civil rights of Latinos for 37 years. To suddenly be accused of being something bad, and that anyone associated with it should not be allowed to serve on the Supreme Court, to me is shocking." Mayor of New York Michael Bloomberg came to PRLDEF's defense, saying "While we have not always agreed on every issue, the group has made countless important contributions to New York City."

In December 2008, LatinoJustice PRLDEF filed an unusual international petition with the Inter-American Commission on Human Rights of the Organization of American States, charging that the United States was failing to protect Latinos living within its borders and was thus falling short of several human rights manifestos. In March 2010, the group urged Governor of Puerto Rico Luis Fortuño to delay by at least six months the effective date of a new birth certificate law, which as of July 2010 would invalidate all previously issued birth certificates. PRLDEF was concerned that the new law, whose objective was to stop identity theft and fraud, would harm Stateside Puerto Ricans applying for a driver's license or a job. (The governor delayed the law by three months.)

In 2011, Perales stepped down as president of the organization and was replaced by civil rights lawyer Juan Cartagena. Perales was subsequently named Secretary of State of New York.

In 2021, Cartagena stepped down and Lourdes Rosado became President and General Counsel of LatinoJustice PRLDEF.
