= Angelo Falcón =

Puerto Rican political scientist

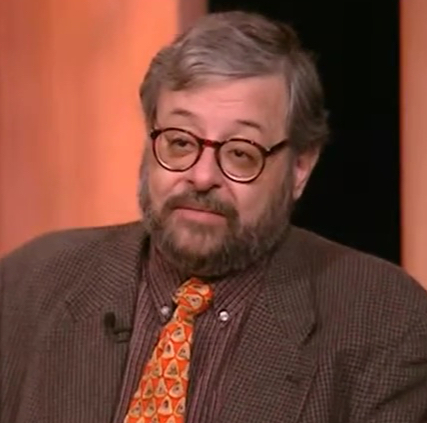
- Falcón on CUNY TV's The Urban Agenda, 2005
- Born: Angel Manuel Falcón, hijo June 23, 1951; San Juan, Puerto Rico
- Died: May 24, 2018 (aged 66); Brooklyn, New York
- Occupation: Political scientist
- Known for: Founder, Institute for Puerto Rican Policy (IPR), now the National Institute for Latino Policy (NiLP)

Angelo Falcón (June 23, 1951 – May 24, 2018) was a Puerto Rican political scientist best known for starting the Institute for Puerto Rican Policy (IPR) in New York City in the early 1980s, a nonprofit and nonpartisan policy center that focuses on Latino issues in the United States. It is now known as the National Institute for Latino Policy and Falcón served as its president until his death. He was also an Adjunct Assistant Professor at the Columbia University School of Public and International Affairs (S.I.P.A.).

Falcón was able to combine academic and policy research with an aggressive advocacy style based on broad coalition-building and community organizing. Noted for his caustic sense of humor and his progressive politics, he became one of the longest-serving chief executives of a Latino nonprofit in the country.

== Early years ==
Falcón's parents

Falcón (birth name: Angel Manuel Falcón) was born in San Juan, Puerto Rico, on June 23, 1951, the only son of Dominga "Minga" Cordero and Angel Manuel "Mel" Falcón. He lived in New York City since the age of six months and grew up in the Los Sures (Southside) section of Williamsburg, Brooklyn.

Falcón attended Public School 17 in Williamsburg, where his first grade teacher unilaterally changed his name to "Angelo" from "Angel," thinking it was a typo. He went on to attend the citywide specialized Brooklyn Technical High School (1965–1969) in Ft. Greene, Brooklyn, where he graduated with a specialization in architecture. In high school, he joined with other Puerto Rican and Latino students to organize the El Nuevo Mundo Aspira Club, which began his involvement in community affairs. He went on to attend Columbia College of Columbia University (Class of 1973) where he continued his activism as Chair of the Latin American Student Organization (LASO) and helping to establish the first HEOP, or Higher Education Opportunity Program, at the college. In 1976, he attended the State University of New York at Albany, where he did his graduate work in political science. He completed a Master of Science degree and most requirements for his doctorate, returning to New York City as an ABD (all but dissertation) in 1980 to write his dissertation. He was awarded the Nelson A. Rockefeller Distinguished Alumni Award from the SUNY-Albany in 1983.

In the early 1970s he worked with ASPIRA of New York, first as a Club Organizer and rising to the position of the Director of their Manhattan Center. This was during the period when Aspira of New York sued the NYC Board of Education, resulting the historic Aspira Consent Decree (1974) mandating transitional bilingual education programs for eligible Puerto Rican and other Latino students.

During his graduate studies in Albany in the late 1970s, he worked as a teaching assistant and as a technical researcher with the Capitol District Regional Planning Commission. He helped organize a graduate student organization as a result of a fight he led to overturn unfair plagiarism rules adopted by the faculty. During this period, he often visited his high school friend and collaborator, Jose Ramon Sanchez, who attended the University of Michigan as a graduate student in the Political Science Department. They engaged in long discussions about what they were learning and what it meant for the Puerto Rican and Latino community. It was during this 1975 to 1977 period that they agreed that their academic studies had given them new and useful skills that had to be put to use to lift the economic, political, and cultural plight for their community. They decided that they had to find a way to take their research "off the shelf" and put to practical use once they were both back in New York City.

== Institute for Puerto Rican Policy ==
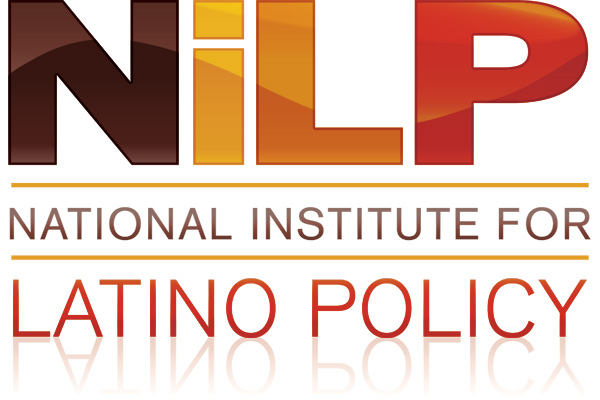

Upon his return to New York City in 1980, he began teaching part-time to start work on his doctoral dissertation. He taught at Queens College and the John Jay College of Criminal Justice. In 1981, while at John Jay, he began organizing, along with Jose Ramon Sanchez, what became the Institute for Puerto Rican Policy (IPR), as a volunteer organization. Angelo and Jose were both working at John Jay College. Angelo worked as an adjunct professor in the Puerto Rican Studies program. Jose worked at the Center for Puerto Rican Studies - El Centro. Angelo and Jose decided to realize their dreams of taking research "off the shelves."

Angelo and Jose put together a proposal to create an institute that would identify how public policy decisions and programs had a distinct impact on the Puerto Rican community. They also wanted to shape how public policy could be better shaped to provide the Puerto Rican community with more benefits and development. They submitted the proposal to El Centro, then being directed by the eminent scholar Frank Bonilla. He rejected the idea and the proposal. Angelo and Jose took the proposal to other organizations. But they all rejected the idea that there could ever be a way to separate a Puerto Rican centered public policy. Undaunted, they decided to go at it on their own. They created an iPR advisory board and began making plans to begin their work. At one point, Josie Nieves, an iPR Advisory Board member, granted iPR a small grant of about $3000. Angelo and Jose decided to use that money to buy a computer to begin parsing through available data and identify a Puerto Rican focus to public policy research. That computer was a Radio Shack TRS 80 model with a cassette data drive. June 1982, the Institute became a 501(c)(3) nonprofit corporation and received its first foundation grant from the New World Foundation. The distinguished scholar and policy activist Marilyn Aquirre became the first chair of the iPR Board. Jose served on the board as well. Angelo became executive director.

Since that point, Falcón headed the Institute continuously for close to 30 years. During this period, despite its small size, the Institute developed a national reputation as one of the most innovative policy centers addressing Latino issues in the country. The first major impact of iPR's policy research activism was in 1982 when they published a report that revealed that the newly elected governor of New York State, Mario Cuomo, had lied and failed to deliver on his promise to address the extremely low employment of Puerto Ricans and Latinos in State government.

During 1986-1990 he also served as one of the Co-Principal Researchers (along with Rodolfo O. de la Garza of the University of Texas at Austin, F. Chris Garcia of the University of New Mexico, and John Garcia of the University of Arizona) of the Latino National Political Survey (LNPS), one of the largest privately funded social surveys of Latino political attitudes and behavior ever conducted in the United States. In the mid-1990s he was one of the key organizers of the Boricua First! march on Washington, DC and in the early 2000s of the Encuentro Boricua Conference in New York City, among other national initiatives.

In 1999, the Institute for Puerto Rican Policy joined in a strategic alliance with the Puerto Rican Legal Defense and Education Fund (PRLDEF) at the Fund's invitation, where the institute was renamed the PRLDEF Institute for Puerto Rican Policy and functioned as PRLDEF's Policy Division. During this period he served as PRLDEF's Senior Policy Executive and Director of the PRLDEF Institute for Puerto Rican Policy. On November 18, 2005, the Institute became independent once again and in 2006 changed its name to the National Institute for Latino Policy (NiLP), with Falcón as its president.

Since 2000, Falcón also co-chaired the New York Chapter of the National Hispanic Media Coalition. In 2001, he was profiled in a "Public Lives" column in the New York Times ("A 20-Year Battler for Puerto Rican Political Pull" by John Kifner, June 20, 2001, Section B, page 2). In 2004, he wrote the Atlas of Stateside Puerto Ricans for the government of Puerto Rico and also co-edited the book, Boricuas in Gotham: Puerto Ricans in the Making of Modern New York. He was named as one of the top 25 "New York Latino movers and shakers" in 2006 by the New York Post (November 28, 2006), and was the recipient of the "Little Flower" Award for Outstanding Community Service from LaGuardia Community College (CUNY) in 2007. Also in 2007, he was elected to the National Steering Committee of the Census Information Centers (CIC) program of the Census Bureau. In 2008, he was appointed by the U.S. Commerce Secretary to the 9-member Advisory Committee on the Hispanic Population of the Census Bureau's Race and Ethnic Advisory Committees (REAC) program. In 2009 he was elected chair of both the Census Advisory Committee on the Hispanic Population and of the Steering Committee of the Census Information Centers Program.

In 2006, Falcón created the Latino Policy Network (currently called The NiLP Network) to diffuse policy and political information of importance to the Latino community online. The NiLP Network, with more than 8,000 members, has become possibly the most influential online community of Latino political civic and academic leaders in the United States. Through this network, NiLP has also created the Latino Census Network and the Latino Voting Rights Network. Besides timely information dissemination, the network members have also been polled from time to time on critical Latino policy issues through its National Latino Opinion Leaders Survey (NLOLS).

Falcón lived in his childhood neighborhood of "the Sures" in the Williamsburg section of Brooklyn. A diabetic, Falcón suffered a fatal heart attack in front of his home on May 24, 2018.

== Contributions ==
Angelo Falcón's research on Puerto Rican and Latino politics and policy issues has made a number of important contributions to these fields. These include:

- In his 1978 study, "The Puerto Rican Activist Stratum in New York City," Falcón, using elite sample survey methods, provided one of the earliest most in-depth analyses of the nature and attitudes ever conducted of Puerto Rican political and community leaders in New York City.

- His founding and work with the Institute for Puerto Rican Policy (1981-2005) has resulted in a number of critical developments in the area of Latino politics and policy. This includes: the first consistent nonpartisan studies of the Puerto Rican and Latino vote at the local and national levels; groundbreaking studies on public sector employment and other access issues for Latinos with government and the private sectors; and the development of the "guerrilla research" approach of aggressive action-research from the perspective of the poor and that held the Puerto Rican/Latino political leadership accountable as well as non-Latinos. During the 1980s and 1990s, the Institute was credited with bringing back the advocacy role of Latino community-based organizations and the value of policy analysis as part of their ongoing missions. The Institute’s projects on promoting greater Latino participation in the 2000 Census and in the political redistricting process have introduced new participatory approaches to these civic participation issues that are new in the Latino community.

- His 1983 paper, "Puerto Rican Political Participation: New York City and Puerto Rico," was the first systematic examination of the contrast in voting levels between Puerto Ricans in Puerto Rico, which have been high, and New York City which have been extremely low. He demonstrated the role that social and political structure plays in affecting levels of political participation.

- His 1985 discussion paper, "Black and Puerto Rican Politics in New York City: Race and Ethnicity in a Changing Urban Context," was the first systematic examination of the implications of New York becoming a "majority minority" city and one of the first analyses of the relationship between Black and Latino politics.

- As one of the principal investigators with the 1989-90 Latino National Political Survey (LNPS), Falcón was part of a team of political scientists that conducted this landmark $2 million household survey of Latino political attitudes and behavior in the United States. This was the largest privately funded survey of its kind ever conducted and generated important baseline data on the Latino political experience still in use today.

- His publication of the monthly "Crítica: A Journal of Puerto Rican Policy & Politics" in 1994-1997 created a unique forum for the discussion of Puerto Rican community issues. This controversial monthly became an important vehicle for holding public official, Latino and non-Latino alike, accountable to community interests. There are plans to bring this publication back as a journal focusing on Latino policy and political issues in 2007.

- His 2000 report, Opening the Courthouse Doors: The Need for More Hispanic Judges, had the impact of raising consciousness of this issue in the United States Congress and resulting in the appointment of more Latinos to the federal judiciary. In addition, this report was also helpful in derailing the nomination of conservative Miguel Estrada by President Bush to the federal bench.

- The 2004 report by Falcón for the government of Puerto Rico, the Atlas of Stateside Puerto Ricans, was the first documentation of the growth of the stateside Puerto Rican population to the point of exceeding for the first time the Puerto Rican population in Puerto Rico. The report also examined the growing economic power of the stateside Puerto Rican community and estimated that they sent close to $1 billion a year to Puerto Rico in what the equivalent of remittances. This report presented a different and more positive image of stateside Puerto Ricans and promoted discussion of the need for a new relationship between Puerto Rico and its diaspora.

- Boricuas in Gotham: Puerto Ricans in the Making of Modern New York, a book published in 2004 that he co-edited, is an important contribution to the historiography of the city’s Puerto Rican community. One of his chapters in the book, "De’tras Pa’lante: Explorations on the Future History of Puerto Ricans in New York City," is considered one of the major statements on the status of the Puerto Rican community of New York City today.

- In 2006, Falcón created what has come to be known as The NiLP Network, the national online community of Latino opinion leaders and advocates hosted by the National Institute for Latino Policy (NiLP). This has become one of the most influential online information networks on policy and political issues in the Latino community today. The NiLP Network built on the powerful legacy of the ipr-forum, one of the first listservs on Puerto Rican issues that was hosted by the Institute for Puerto Rican Policy (IPR) in the 1990s.

- In 2007, Falcón created the Latino Census Network, an informational network on Latino Census issues comprising the leading Latino advocacy organizations at the national, state and local levels. This is the first systematic effort to coordinate the work of Latino communities throughout the United States and its territories in preparation for the 2010 Census.

- In 2008, he was appointed by the US Commerce Secretary to the Census Advisory Committee on the Hispanic population, to which he was elected Chair in 2009. In 2009, he was also elected Chair of the Steering Committee of the Census Information Centers (CIC) Program of the Census Bureau. In these roles, Falcón has become a major advisor to the Census Bureau on issues affecting Latinos and other communities of color.

- In 2008, Falcón was one of the founders of the New York City Collaborative for Fairness and Equity in Philanthropy (CFEP), becoming its founding Chair. This is a unique coalition of nonprofits of color and foundations working to give greater voice to communities of color in discussions and policies regarding increasing diversity in the foundation sector.

- In 2010, his work with the Latino Census Network and role as a volunteer Census Bureau advisor contributed to one of the best counts of the Latino population in the 2010 Census. Falcón serves as Chair of the Census Advisory Committee on the Hispanic Population, and Chair of the Census Information Centers (CIC) Program of the US Census Bureau. His February 2010 report, Data Dissemination in Communities of Color: The Role of the Census Information Centers (New York, National Institute for Latino Policy, 2010), outlines issues in increasing access to Census data by Latinos and other communities of color.

- In 2011, he coordinated a major Northeast Latino Regional Redistricting Meeting in New York City that brought together more than 100 Latino voting rights advocates from throughout the region. This was the major kick-off activity for redistricting work on behalf of Latino communities in New Jersey, New York, Philadelphia, Massachusetts and other Northeastern states. His coordination of The NiLP Network on Latino Issues continued to make this the most influential online community of Latino opinion leaders in the United States.

- In 2012, Falcón generated much debate with the publication fa series of NiLP i Reports, which included: The Vanishing Puerto Rican Student at the City University of New York (CUNY), NiLP Latino Policy iReport (August 14, 2012); A Boricua Game of Thrones? A Critical Review of the Rise of Puerto Rican Political Families in New York City, NiLP Latino Policy iReport (July 29, 2012); Latinos and NYC Council Districting, 2012: An Introduction (New York: National Institute for Latino Policy, March 2012); and NYC Council Discretionary Funding of Latino Organizations, Fiscal Year 2013, NiLP Latino Datanote (July 8, 2012). As part of NiLP's media advocacy efforts, he also compiled the NYC Latino Experts Media Directory (New York: National Institute for Latino Policy, June 2012).

- During the period 2012 to 2016 Falcón’s research continued to promote widespread discussion on the Latino community nationally on key issues. The Latino Policy Network was renamed The NiLP Report on Latino Policy & Politics and became the principal vehicle for promoting Falcón research and analyses. During the 2016 Presidential election, Falcón conducted the National Latino Opinion Leaders Survey more frequently as the only polling of Latino elites conducted on this important election. He also wrote a number of commentaries prompting a debate on new directions for the discussion of the future of comprehensive immigration reform. He also wrote extensively on the Puerto Rico debt crisis and the role of the Puerto Rican Diaspora in addressing this problem. Falcón also served as technical advisor to the Campaign for Fair Latino Representation, a citywide coalition formed in 2014, Its purpose is to promote the greater participation of Latinos in NYC government and the administration of Mayor Bill de Blasio, based on research conducted by Falcón on the underrepresentation of Latinos in city government appointments. He also wrote a series of analyses on the state of Latino politics in New York City from a citywide perspective. Falcón collaborated with political scientist Sherrie Baver and historian Gabriel Haslip-Viera in co-editing and contributing to the second edition of the popular reader, Latinos in New York: Communities in Transition, to be published by the University of Notre Dame Press in 2017.

== Directorships ==
- National Hispanic Leadership Agenda (NHLA) (Washington, DC)
- Census Information Centers Steering Committee (Suitland, MD)
- Latino Policy Coalition (Los Angeles)
- National Hispanic Media Coalition (NHMC) (Los Angeles)
- National Latino Media Council (Los Angeles)
- La Fuente Worker-Community Collaborative (New York City)
- Vamos4PR Steering Committee (New York City)
- Coalition Against Hate

== Selected published works ==
=== As author ===
- Data Dissemination in Communities of Color: The Role of the Census Information Centers (New York: National Institute for Latino Policy, 2010)
- Atlas of Stateside Puerto Ricans (Washington, DC: Puerto Rico Federal Affairs Administration, 2004)
- Opening the Courthouse Doors: The Need for More Hispanic Judges (New York: Puerto Rican Legal Defense and Education Fund, 2002)
- Still on the Outside Looking In: Latino Employment in New York Broadcast Television (New York: National Hispanic Media Coalition, 2001)
- "A History of Puerto Rican Politics in New York City: 1860s to 1945" and "An Introduction to the Literature of Puerto Rican politics in Urban America" in Puerto Rican Politics in Urban America, edited by James Jennings and Monte Rivera (Westport, CT: Greenwood Press, 1983)

=== As co-editor ===
- Latinos in New York: Communities in Transition (Notre Dame: University of Notre Dame, forthcoming 2017)
- Boricuas in Gotham: Puerto Ricans in the Making of Modern New York City (Princeton: Markus Wiener Publishers, 2004)
- Latino Voices: Mexican, Puerto Rican & Cuban Perspectives on American Politics. Westview Press. 1992. Archived from the original on 2006-01-10 – via Questia.
- Latinos and Politics: A Select Research Bibliography (Austin: University of Texas Press, 1991)

=== Other contributions ===
- The Nation
- El Diario-La Prensa
- Hispanic Link
- Critíca: The Journal of Puerto Rican Policy & Politics
- NACLA Report on the Americas
- Comedy Central's The Colbert Report

== See also ==
- List of Puerto Ricans
