= ASPIRA Association =

Nonprofitable organization

ASPIRA Association Inc.
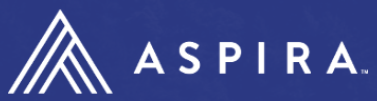
- Founded: 1961; 65 years ago
- Founder: Antonia Pantoja
- Type: Nonprofit organization
- Tax ID no.: 13-2627568
- Legal status: 501(c)(3)
- Purpose: To cultivate a connected world through shared experiences.
- Headquarters: 1220 L St., NW Suite 701
- Location: Washington, D.C., United States
- Coordinates: 38.90353°N 77.02905°W
- Chair: Alfonso Davila
- President: Ronald Blackburn-Moreno
- Revenue: $291,677 (2020)
- Expenses: $652,968 (2020)
- Endowment: $1,428,246 _{(2020)}
- Employees: 3 (2019)
- Volunteers: 9 (2019)
- Website: www.aspira.org

The ASPIRA Association is an American nonprofit organization whose mission is to "empower the Latino community through advocacy and the education and leadership development of its youth". ASPIRA's national office is in Washington, D.C., and it has affiliates in Connecticut, Delaware, Florida, Illinois, Massachusetts, New Jersey, New York, Pennsylvania, and Puerto Rico. It is one of the largest national Latino nonprofit organizations in the United States.

Former ASPIRA club members, or ASPIRANTES, as they are known, include ACLU's Anthony Romero, former Bronx Borough President and New York City democratic mayoral nominee Fernando Ferrer, Illinois politician Billy Ocasio and actor Jimmy Smits.

== History ==
ASPIRA was founded in New York City in 1961 by Dr. Antonia Pantoja to combat the exorbitant dropout rate among Puerto Rican high school youth. It expanded nationally in 1968 as ASPIRA of America—today known as the ASPIRA Association.

== ASPIRA of New York ==
Aspira of New York operates youth development clubs, dropout prevention initiatives and after school programs which serve more than 8,000 young people each year in the five boroughs of New York City and Nassau and Suffolk counties.

ASPIRA of New York, with the support of ASPIRA of America and the representation of the Puerto Rican Legal Defense and Education Fund, filed a suit against the New York City Board of Education in 1972 that led to the ASPIRA Consent Decree. The decree, signed August 29, 1974, established the right of New York City public school students with limited English proficiency to receive bilingual education.

== ASPIRA of Pennsylvania ==
ASPIRA's Pennsylvania affiliate was founded in 1969 and operates several community-based programs and five charter schools - Antonia Pantoja, Eugenio Maria De Hostos, Stetson Charter School, Aspira Bilingual Cyber Charter School and Olney Charter High School. Stetson and Olney are both Renaissance turnarounds - district schools for which the School District of Philadelphia contracts the operations to ASPIRA. ASPIRA of Pennsylvania also controls a property management company, Aspira Community Enterprises, which in turn controls ACE/Dougherty LLC.

The schools pay ASPIRA as the charter operator set management fees and rent. In addition, the schools also loan ASPIRA money. According to an independent audit, ASPIRA owes the publicly funded schools a total of $3.3 million as of June 30, 2012. Despite this fact, the School Reform Commission (the group that controls the School District of Philadelphia) voted in May 2013 to renew the charters for Pantoja and De Hostos.

During the course of their anti-union campaign at Olney, Aspira of Pennsylvania has been accused of violating the National Labor Relations Act. Specific allegations include holding unlawful interrogations of teachers, the circulation of anti-union literature, and the singling out of union supporters for pre-textual discipline. A complaint filed before the National Labor Relations Board also alleges that ASPIRA of Pennsylvania has threatened to lay off teachers "as a direct result of union organizing." A third complaint alleges that a discipline policy introduced in December 2013 would restrict employees abilities to communicate with one another. A fourth complaint filed in January 2014 concerns a social media policy that bars workers from disparaging Aspira of Pennsylvania on social media.

In August 2013, the National Labor Relations Board (NLRB) ruled in favor of the teachers and found that Olney's principal and assistant principals had interrogated and threatened teachers. Olney High School and John Stetson both returned to the School District of Philadelphia and their faculties were absorbed into the Philadelphia Federation of Teachers.

== ASPIRA of Illinois ==
ASPIRA of Illinois operates three charter high schools and one charter middle school. The board of directors voted 5-4 to fire its CEO in March 2012 due to low test scores - Aspira of Illinois student test scores were lower than averages for the Chicago Public Schools for at least six years in a row.

== Bibliography ==
- DeSipio, Louis, and Adrian D. Pantoja (2004). "Puerto Rican Exceptionalism? A Comparative Analysis of Puerto Rican, Mexican, Salvadoran and Dominican Transnational Civic and Political Ties" (Paper delivered at The Project for Equity Representation and Governance Conference entitled "Latino Politics: The State of the Discipline," Bush Presidential Conference Center, Texas A&M University in College Station, TX, April 30 – May 1, 2004)
