= List of Hispanic and Latino Americans =

This is a list of notable Hispanic and Latino Americans: citizens or residents of the United States with origins in Latin America or Spain. The following groups are officially designated as "Hispanic and Latino Americans": Mexican American, (Stateside) Puerto Rican, Cuban American, Dominican American, Costa Rican American, Guatemalan American, Honduran American, Nicaraguan American, Panamanian American, Salvadoran American, Argentine American, Bolivian American, Brazilian American, Chilean American, Colombian American, Ecuadorian American, Paraguayan American, Peruvian American, Spanish American, Uruguayan American, and Venezuelan American. However, Hispanic or Latino people can have any ancestry.

== Arts ==
=== Dance ===
- Alec Lazo, ballroom dancer and instructor; Cuban American
- José Limón, modern dancer and choreographer; Mexican American
- Augie & Margo Rodriguez, celebrity performers starting with the Mambo days of the 1950s

=== Actors ===
- Dolores del Río
- Rita Hayworth (Spanish father)
- Jay Hernandez
- Lalo Ríos
- Jennifer Lopez
- Cameron Díaz (Cuban father)
- Jorge García
- Joshua Gomez
- Michelle Rodriguez
- George Lopez
- Gina Rodriguez
- Isabela Moner
- Jason Genao
- Michael Trevino
- Bella Thorne
- Sofia Vergara
- Michael Peña
- Edward James Olmos
- Desi Arnaz
- Richard Esteras

=== Cartoonists and animators ===
- Sergio Aragonés, Spanish born-American cartoonist and writer known for his contributions to Mad Magazine and creator of the comic book Groo the Wanderer."
- José Argüelles (1939–2011), American New Age author and artist. His father was Spanish.
- Antonio Prohías, Cuban American creator of Mad Magazine's Spy vs Spy series
- Michael Peraza, Cuban American animator, art director, conceptual artist and historian of animation, who has worked for The Walt Disney Company, Fox Features, and Warner Brothers.
- Emma Ríos, is a comics artist, writer, and editor with an international presence in the comics industry. She has worked for some of the largest American comics publishers, including Marvel, Image, and Boom! Studios.
- Joe Quesada, Cuban American comic book editor, writer producer and artist
- Al Williamson, artist of Flash Gordon, Star Wars, Secret Agent Corrigan, and EC science fiction comic books. His father was Colombian.

=== Directors, screenwriters and producers ===
- Félix Enríquez Alcalá (born 1951) – American television and film director of Mexican descent
- Kevin Alejandro (born 1976) – American actor and film director of Mexican descent
- Natalia Almada (born 1974) – Mexican-born American documentary filmmaker
- Cristela Alonzo (born 1979) – American comedian, actor, writer and producer of Mexican descent
- John A. Alonzo (1934–2001) – American cinematographer of Mexican descent, Academy Award nominee and Emmy Award winner
- Elisa Marina Alvarado – American director of Mexican and Cuban descent
- Rafael Alvarez (born May 24, 1958) – American screenwriter. He is of Spanish partial descent
- Robert Alvarez (born 1948) – American animator, television director, and writer of Mexican descent
- Michael Arias (born 1968) – American anime filmmaker based in Japan. He is of Mexican descent
- Eva Aridjis (born 1974) – American film director, screenwriter, TV writer of Mexican descent
- Miguel Arteta (born 1965) – Puerto Rican director of film and television, known for his independent film Chuck & Buck (2000), for which he received the Independent Spirit John Cassavetes Award, and Cedar Rapids. He is son of a Peruvian father and a Spanish mother
- Ozzie Alfonso – Cuban American TV director, writer, producer; directed Sesame Street in the 1970s; senior producer, writer, and director of 3-2-1 Contact in the 1980s; freelanced for many clients; adjunct college professor at St. John's University
- Elizabeth Avellán (born 1960) – Venezuelan-born American film producer
- Ivonne Belén – Puerto Rican documentary film director and producer
- Roberto Benabib (born 1959) – Mexican-born American television writer, producer, and film director, Emmy Award nominee
- J. Robert Bren (1903–1981) – Mexican-born American screenwriter and producers, wrote 30 films between the '30s and '50s
- Edward Carrere (1906–1984) – Mexican-born America art director, Academy Award winner and two-time nominee
- Rafael Casal (born 1985) – American writer, actor, producer, and showrunner. He is of Irish, Spanish, and Cuban descent.
- Natalie Chaidez (born 1950) – American writer and producer of Mexican and Irish descent, Emmy Award nominee
- Migdia Chinea – Cuban American film director, writer, producer (When it rains..., The Incredible Hulk)
- Fernanda Coppel – Mexican-born American screenwriter and playwright
- Julio Hernández Cordón (born 1975) – American director and screenwriter of Mexican descent
- Manny Coto – American of Cuban origin. He is executive producer (24), writer (24, Star Trek: Enterprise)
- Terri Doty (born 1984) – American animation voice actress, voice director, and writer of Mexican descent
- René Echevarria – American of Cuban origin. He is a writer (Star Trek: The Next Generation, Star Trek: Deep Space Nine, Medium), co-creator of The 4400
- Mike Elizalde (born 1960) – Mexican-born American special makeup effects artist, Academy Award nominee
- Moctezuma Esparza (born 1949) – American producer of Mexican descent, Academy Award and Emmy Award nominee
- Carlos López Estrada (born 1988) – Mexican-born American music video, commercial, and film director
- Hampton Fancher (born 1938) – American producer and screenwriter of Mexican and Danish descent
- America Ferrera (born 1984) – American actress, producer, and director of Honduran descent
- William A. Fraker (1923–2010) – American cinematographer, director, and producer of Mexican descent, six-time Academy Award nominee
- Andy García – Cuban-born American director (Lost City)
- Dany Garcia – Cuban American film producer
- Nick Gomez (born 1963) – American film director to a Chilean father
- Alfonso Gomez-Rejon (born 1972) – American film and television director of Mexican descent, two-time Emmy Award nominee
- Heather Hemmens – American actress, film director and producer; born to a Costa Rican mother
- Silvio Horta – Cuban American. He is a creator and writer (Ugly Betty), writer (Urban Legends, Jake 2.0)
- Leon Ichaso – Cuban American. He is a director/screenwriter (El Super), director (Ali: An American Hero, Crossover Dreams, Piñero, El Cantante)
- Valentina L. Garza – writer and producer for The Simpsons (Cuban American)
- Neal Jimenez (born 1960) – American screenwriter and film director of Mexican descent
- Emile Kuri (1907–2000) – Mexican-born American set decorator, won two Academy Awards and was nominated for six more in the category Best Art Direction
- William Douglas Lansford (1922–2013) – American screenwriter, film producer, and author of English and Mexican descent
- Paul Lerpae (1900–1989) – Mexican-born American special effects artist, Academy Award nominee
- Lisa Loomer – playwright and screenwriter of Spanish and Romanian ancestry
- Jenée LaMarque (born 1980) – American writer and director of Mexican descent
- Bill Melendez (1916–2008) – Mexican-born American animator, director, and producer, eight-time Emmy Award winner and Academy Award nominee
- Steven C. Melendez (born 1945) – American animator, director, and producer of Mexican descent, Emmy Award winner (son of Bill Melendez)
- Linda Mendoza (born 1950) – American television and film director of Mexican descent
- Joe Menendez – Cuban American; TV and film director (Ladrón que roba a ladrón, From Dusk till Dawn: The Series, 12 Monkeys, Queen of the South)
- Adrian Molina (born 1985) – American screenwriter, storyboard artist, and animation director of Mexican descent, Emmy Award nominee
- Sylvia Morales (born 1943) – American director, writer, and producer of Mexican descent, Emmy Award nominee
- S. J. Main Muñoz (born 1978) – American filmmaker to a Costa Rican mother
- Gregory Nava (born 1949) – American director, producer and screenwriter of Mexican descent, Academy Award and Emmy Award nominee
- Edward James Olmos (born 1947) – American director and actor of Mexican descent, Emmy and Golden Globe winner
- Roberto Orci (born 1973) – Mexican-born American screenwriter and producer (Star Trek, The Proposal) and writer (Transformers, Eagle Eye, Star Trek)
- Manuel Perez (animator) (1914–1981) – American animator and animation director of Mexican descent
- Richard Peña – American film festival organizer, New York Film Festival; professor of film studies at Columbia University
- Tony Plana (born 1952) – Cuban-born American actor and director (Ugly Betty)
- Polish brothers – American screenwriters and producers to a mother of Mexican descent
- Lourdes Portillo (born 1944) – Mexican-born American filmmaker
- Gabby Revilla – Nicaraguan-born American film director and producer and writer
- Georgina Garcia Riedel – American filmmaker and scriptwriter of Mexican descent
- Jonas Rivera (born 1971) – American producer with Pixar films of Mexican descent, Academy Award winner
- Robert Rodríguez (born 1968) – American director, producer and screenwriter of Mexican descent
- Phil Roman (born 1930) – American animation director of Mexican descent, founder of Film Roman animation studio, six-time Emmy Award winner
- George A. Romero – American film director, screenwriter and editor (Night of the Living Dead, Dawn of the Dead), creator of the Living Dead film series; son of a Spanish-born Cuban father of Galician heritage and a Lithuanian American mother.
- Bernardo Ruiz – documentary filmmaker of Mexican origin
- Craig Saavedra (born 1963) – American producer and director of Mexican descent, two-time Tony Award nominee
- Victor Salva (born 1958) – American filmmaker of Mexican descent
- Jesús Salvador Treviño (born 1946) – American television director of Mexican descent, three-time Emmy Award nominee
- Eduardo Sánchez – Cuban-born American director (The Blair Witch Project)
- Johnny Sanchez (born 1958) – American actor, writer, and film producer
- Amy Serrano – director, cinematographer, and writer (The Sugar Babies), producer of documentary films, poet (Cuban American)
- Jaume Collet-Serra (born March 23, 1974) – Spanish-born American film director and producer
- Tony Taccone – American theater director; of Italian and a Puerto Rican descent
- Jessy Terrero – Dominican-born American film and music video director
- Carles Torrens (born 1984) – Spanish-born film and television director, screenwriter, editor, and producer
- Gabriel Traversari (born 1963) – American actor and director of Nicaraguan descent
- Rose Troche (born 1964) – American film and television director, television producer, and screenwriter of Puerto Rican descent
- Jose Luis Valenzuela – American theater and film director of Mexican origin
- Jeff Valdez (born 1956) – American producer, writer, and studio executive of Mexican origin
- Luis Valdez (born 1940) – American playwright and director of Mexican descent
- Joseph Vasquez (1962–1995) – American independent filmmaker
- Chris Weitz (born 1969) – American writer, producer, director; grandmother was Mexican actress Lupita Tovar
- Paul Weitz (born 1965) – writer, producer, director; grandmother was Mexican actress Lupita Tovar
- Hype Williams (born 1970) – American music video director, film director, film producer, and screenwriter. He is of African-American and Honduran descent
- Rafael Yglesias (born May 12, 1954, New York) – American novelist and screenwriter. His parents were the novelists Jose Yglesias and Helen Yglesias.
- Rudy Zamora (1910–1989) – Mexican-born American animator and animation director, Emmy Award nominee

=== Visual arts ===
- Laura Aguilar, artist, photographer; Mexican American
- Celia Alvarez Muñoz, artist; Mexican American
- Judy Baca, artist; Mexican American
- Jean-Michel Basquiat, artist; Puerto Rican-Haitian American
- José Bernal, artist
- Rosa Maria Calles, artist and playwright
- Harry Gamboa Jr., artist; Mexican American
- Soraida Martinez, artist, creator of Verdadism; Puerto Rican (American)
- Franck de Las Mercedes, painter; Nicaraguan American
- Antonio Roybal, painter and sculptor; Mexican American
- Richard Serra, sculptor
- John August Swanson, painter; Mexican American
- Jhonen Vasquez, cartoonist, comic book artist; Mexican American

=== Music ===
See Latin music in the United States

==== Alphabetized by surname ====
- Miguel del Aguila, composer; Uruguayan American
- Christina Aguilera, singer; Ecuadorian American
- Luis Miguel, singer; Mexican American
- Julia Alvarez, author; Dominican American
- Tatyana Ali, singer; Panamanian American
- Anacani, singer; Mexican American
- Tom Araya, bassist and vocalist of thrash metal band Slayer; Chilean American
- David Archuleta, American Idol finalist, singer and actor; Honduran American
- AZ, rapper from Brooklyn, New York; Dominican American
- Big Pun, Christopher Rios first solo Hispanic rapper to go platinum, Puerto Rican (American)
- B-Real, rapper from Cypress Hill; Cuban-Mexican American
- Baby Bash, R&B singer; Mexican American
- Joan Baez, folk singer; Mexican American
- Devendra Banhart, freak folk singer, half-Venezuelan American
- Lloyd Banks, rapper, member of G-Unit; Puerto Rican (American)
- Sergio Andrade, musician (bassist founder of LIFEHOUSE); Guatemalan American
- Cedric Bixler-Zavala, lead singer for At the Drive-In and Mars Volta; Mexican American
- Rubén Blades, singer and actor; Panamanian American
- Ryan Cabrera, singer; Colombian American
- Irene Cara, Grammy-nominated singer; Cuban American
- Mariah Carey, singer; Venezuelan American
- Vikki Carr, singer; Mexican American
- Ingrid Chavez, vocalist and songwriter; Mexican American
- Chayanne, Puerto Rican (American)
- Chingo Bling, rapper; Mexican American
- Willy Chirino, singer; Cuban American
- Lisa Coleman, musician/composer, member of Prince and The Revolution and Wendy & Lisa
- Nichole Cordova, singer; Spanish American
- Manny Marroquin, Grammy Award-winning mixer/engineer; Guatemalan American
- Celia Cruz, multiple Grammy-winning singer; Cuban American
- Cuban Link, rapper; Cuban American
- Daddy Yankee, Reggaeton rapper; Puerto Rican (American)
- DJ Kane, singer; Mexican American
- Paula DeAnda, R&B, pop singer; Mexican American
- Kat DeLuna, pop singer; Dominican American
- Howie Dorough, singer, Backstreet Boys; Puerto Rican (American)
- Fabolous, rapper; Dominican American
- Fat Joe, Puerto Rican-Cuban American
- Fergie, singer, Black Eyed Peas; Mexican American
- Aundrea Fimbres, singer, Danity Kane; Mexican American
- DJ Flex/Nigga, singer; Panamanian American
- Luis Fonsi, singer; Puerto Rican (American)
- Frankie J, singer; Mexican American
- Mike Fuentes, drummer, percussionist, vocalist in the group Pierce the Veil; Mexican American
- Vic Fuentes, singer-songwriter; Pierce the Veil; Mexican American
- 2Slimey, rapper; Mexican American
- Lalo Guerrero, musician; Mexican American
- Albert Hammond Jr., singer for The Strokes; Peruvian-Argentine American
- Marques Houston, singer; Mexican American
- Vanessa Hudgens, singer and actress; Spanish-Filipino American
- Ivy Queen, Reggaeton rapper; Puerto Rican (American)
- Jim Jones, rapper; Puerto Rican (American)
- Juanes, pop-rock singer; Colombian American
- La India, singer; Puerto Rican (American)
- La Lupe, singer and gay icon; Cuban American
- Héctor Lavoe, Puerto Rican (American)
- Adrianne Leon, actress, singer-songwriter, guitarist; Puerto Rican-Ecuadorian American
- Lil Rob, rapper; Mexican American
- Dave Lombardo, drummer of thrash metal band Slayer; Cuban American
- Olivia Longott, rapper; Cuban American
- Jennifer Lopez, singer; Puerto Rican (American), Nuyorican
- Demi Lovato, singer and actress; Mexican American
- Lumidee, singer; Puerto Rican (American)
- Víctor Manuelle, Salsa singer; Puerto Rican (American)
- Marc Anthony, singer, actor; Puerto Rican (American), Nuyorican
- Martika, Grammy-nominated singer; Cuban American
- MC Magic, R&B singer; Mexican American
- Angie Martinez, radio personality; Puerto Rican (American)
- Cruz Martínez, producer, songwriter and keyboardist from group Los Super Reyes; Mexican American
- S. A. Martinez, lead singer of 311; Mexican American
- Ricky Martin, singer; Puerto Rican (American)
- Natalie Mejia, singer, Girlicious; Cuban-Mexican American
- Christina Milian, singer and actress; Cuban American
- Chino Moreno, lead singer of Deftones; Mexican American
- Chris Montez, Mexican American
- Dave Navarro, lead guitar Jane's Addiction; Mexican American
- Asia Nitollano, member of The Pussycat Dolls; Mexican-Puerto Rican American
- N.O.R.E, hip hop recording artist; Puerto Rican (American)
- Colby O'Donis, singer; Puerto Rican (American)
- Don Omar, Reggaeton rapper; Puerto Rican (American)
- Jeannie Ortega singer; Puerto Rican (American)
- Karina Pasian, singer; Dominican-Armenian American
- Pee Wee, singer and actor; Mexican American
- Jennifer Peña, singer; Mexican American
- Chris Pérez, guitarist from group Kumbia All Starz; Mexican American
- Rudy Pérez, composer and producer; Cuban American
- Pitbull, rapper; Cuban American
- Carlos Ponce, singer; Puerto Rican-Cuban American
- Tito Puente; Puerto Rican (American)
- A. B. Quintanilla III, producer, songwriter and bass guitarist from group Kumbia All Starz; Mexican American
- Gabriel Ríos, pop singer; Puerto Rican (American)
- Jenni Rivera, American singer, songwriter, actress, television producer, spokesperson, philanthropist and entrepreneur
- Zack de la Rocha vocalist, Rage Against the Machine; Mexican American
- Albita Rodríguez, Grammy-winning singer; Cuban American
- Omar Rodríguez-López, lead guitar for At the Drive-In and Mars Volta; Puerto Rican (American)
- Linda Ronstadt, rock singer; Mexican American
- Paulina Rubio, singer; Mexican American
- Michele Ruiz, broadcaster and CEO SaberHacer.com; Panamanian American
- Hope Sandoval, singer, Mazzy Star; Mexican American
- Sonny Sandoval lead singer of P.O.D.; Mexican American
- Carlos Santana, musician; Mexican American
- Juelz Santana, rapper and member of The Diplomats; Dominican American
- Kike Santander, composer and producer; Colombian
- Gustavo Santaolalla, composer, winner of two Oscars for Brokeback Mountain and Babel; Argentine American
- Gilberto Santa Rosa, Salsa singer; Puerto Rican (American)
- Gabe Saporta, lead singer of Cobra Starship; Uruguayan American
- Jon Secada, two-time Grammy-winning singer; Cuban American
- Selena, singer; Mexican American
- Shakira, singer; Colombian American
- Sheila E., percussionist; Mexican American
- South Park Mexican, rapper; Mexican American
- T-Bone (rapper), rapper; Nicaraguan-Salvadoran American
- Taboo, rapper, Black Eyed Peas; Mexican American
- Abel Talamantez, singer and dancer from group Los Super Reyes; Mexican American
- Olga Tañon, merengue singer; Puerto Rican (American)
- Thalía, singer and actress; Mexican American
- Melody Thornton, singer, Pussycat Dolls; Mexican American
- Tony Touch, DJ; Puerto Rican (American)
- Robert Trujillo, bassist of thrash metal band Metallica; Mexican American
- Jose Valdes, jazz pianist; Mexican American
- Ritchie Valens, singer; Mexican American
- Jaci Velasquez, singer and actress; Mexican American
- Julieta Venegas, singer; Mexican American
- Carlos Vives, singer; Colombian American
- Hype Williams, music video and film director; Honduran American
- JR Writer rapper and member of The Diplomats; Dominican American
- Selena Gomez, singer, fashion designer, actress, and record producer; Mexican American
- Ricardo Arjona, Grammy-winning singer; Guatemalan

==== Groups ====
- Aventura, Bachata; Dominican-Puerto Rican American
- Cypress Hill, Rap group; Mexican-Cuban-Puerto Rican American
- El Gran Combo, Puerto Rican (American)
- Intocable, Tejano group; Mexican American
- Kumbia All Starz, Cumbia group; Mexican American
- Kumbia Kings, Cumbia group; Mexican American
- La Mafia, Tejano group; Mexican American
- Los Illegals, punk rock band; Mexican American
- Los Lobos, R&B, rock band; Mexican American
- Los Lonely Boys R&B, rock band; Mexican American
- Los Super Reyes, Cumbia group; Mexican American
- Luny Tunes, production duo; Dominican American
- Nina Sky, twin sister singers; Puerto Rican (American)
- Prima J, Pop/Hip-Hop duo; Mexican American
- Question Mark & the Mysterians, punk rock band; Mexican American
- Thee Midniters, rock and soul group; Mexican American
- Voices of Theory, R&B boy group
- Wisin & Yandel, Puerto Rican (American)

=== Reality show stars ===
- (Honduras) David Archuleta – American Idol contestant; Honduran American
- (Mexico) Amanda Avila – American Idol contestant; Mexican American
- (Uruguay) Christopher Badano – Uruguayan American, American Idol contestant
- (Costa Rica) John Paul (J. P.) Calderon – Survivor: Cook Islands contestant; Costa Rican American
- (Puerto Rico) Jessie Camacho – Survivor: Africa contestant; Puerto Rican American
- (Colombia) Jason Castro, Colombian American, American Idol contestant
- (Venezuela) Rodolfo (Rudy) Cárdenas – Venezuelan American, Top 24 contestant, American Idol
- (Cuba) Jose "Pepi" Diaz – Cuban American, The Apprentice contestant
- (Puerto Rico) Sandra Diaz-Twine – Puerto Rican American, Survivor: Pearl Islands Winner
- (Cuba) Jennifer Fuentes – Cuban American, American Idol contestant
- (Cuba) Nathan Gonzalez – Cuban American, Survivor: Cook Islands contestant
- (Puerto Rico) Jaslene Gonzalez – Puerto Rican American, America's Next Top Model Winner
- (Mexico) David Hernandez – Mexican American, American Idol contestant
- (Mexico) Adriel Herrera – Mexican American, American Idol contestant
- (El Salvador) Allison Iraheta – American Idol contestant; Salvadoran American
- (Cuba) Danny Jimenez – Cuban American, The Amazing Race 2 and The Amazing Race 11 contestant
- (Mexico) Oscar (Ozzy) Lusth – Mexican American, runner-up, Survivor: Cook Islands runner-up, Survivor: Micronesia contestant
- (Cuba) Ashley Massaro – Cuban American, Survivor: China contestant, WWE Diva, Playboy Cover Girl
- (Cuba) Oswald Mendez – Cuban American, The Amazing Race 2 and The Amazing Race 11 contestant
- (Mexico) Naima Mora – Mexican American, America's Next Top Model Winner
- (Puerto Rico) Lydia Morales – Puerto Rican American, Survivor: Guatemala contestant
- (Mexico) Cesar Millan – Mexican American, Star of Dog Whisperer
- (Mexico) Danny Noriega – Mexican American, American Idol contestant
- (Puerto Rico) Jorge Nuñez – Puerto Rican American, American Idol contestant
- (Mexico) Tito Ortiz – Mexican American, contestant on The Celebrity Apprentice, mixed martial arts fighter
- (Cuba) Janu Tornell – Cuban American, Survivor: Palau contestant
- (Puerto Rico) Mario Vazquez – Puerto Rican American, American Idol contestant, semi-finalist
- (Venezuela) Nick Verreos – Venezuelan American, Project Runaway contestant
- (Venezuela) Rita Verreos – Venezuelan American, Survivor: Fiji contestant

=== Fashion ===
- Christy Turlington, fashion model; Salvadoran American
- Marisol Deluna, fashion designer; Spanish American
- Carolina Herrera, fashion designer; Venezuelan American
- Yoanna House, fashion model; Mexican American
- Jaslene Gonzalez, fashion model; Puerto Rican
- Naima Mora, fashion model; Mexican American
- Oscar de la Renta, fashion designer; Dominican American

== Business ==
- (Mexico) Rosa Rios, businesswoman, executive, entrepreneur and an American academic. She served as the 43rd Treasurer of the United States of America.
- (Mexico) Hector Ruiz, chairman and CEO of AMD Advanced Micro Devices
- (Cuba) Ralph Alvarez, President and CEO of McDonald's Corporation.
- Michael Cordúa, restaurateur, entrepreneur, businessman, award-winning self-taught chef; Nicaraguan American*
- (Cuba) Roberto Goizueta, former CEO of Coca-Cola.
- Raul J. Fernandez, entrepreneur, CEO and Chairman of ObjectVideo, and Co-Owner of the Washington Capitals, Washington Wizards, and Washington Mystics; Cuban-Ecuadorian American
- Maria Elena Lagomasino, former CEO of JP Morgan Private Bank
- (Mexico) David Martinez, managing partner of Fintech Advisory
- (Mexico) Arte Moreno, first Hispanic owner of a Major League Baseball club.
- George Muñoz, President of Muñoz Investment Banking Group, LLC.
- Michele Ruiz, founder, President and CEO of SaberHacer.com
- (Spain) Joseph A. Unanue, founder and former president of Goya Foods.
- (Puerto Rico) Richard Velazquez, first Puerto Rican automotive designer for Porsche, first Puerto Rican Xbox Product Planner, co-founder and President of NSHMBA Seattle.
- (Puerto Rico) Maria Vizcarrondo-De Soto, President and CEO of the United Way of Essex and West Hudson
- Luis von Ahn, computer scientist known as one of the pioneers of the idea of crowdsourcing. Founder of the company reCAPTCHA, which was sold to Google in 2009; Guatemalan American

== Civil activists ==
- Carlos Cadena, activist; Mexican American
- Sal Castro, activist
- César Chávez, labor leader; Mexican American
- Linda Chavez-Thompson, labor leader; Mexican American
- Angelo Falcón, political scientist; President and Founder, National Institute for Latino Policy
- Hector P. Garcia, activist; Mexican American
- Gustavo C. Garcia, activist; Mexican American
- Rodolfo Gonzales, activist; Mexican American
- John J. Herrera, activist; Mexican American
- Dolores Huerta, labor leader; Mexican American
- Nativo Lopez, activist; Mexican American
- Angel G. Luévano, labor leader; Mexican American
- Camilo Mejía, former Staff Sergeant of the Florida National Guard and anti-war activist; Nicaraguan American
- Lloyd Monserratt, California political and community leader
- Eugene Nelson, labor leader
- Baldemar Velasquez, activist; Mexican American

== Education ==
- Jaime Escalante, teacher; Bolivian American
- Nicki Gonzales, Colorado State Historian; Regis University professor and vice provost; Mexican-American
- Alberto Ríos, American academic, author and poet
- Richard A. Tapia, member of the National Science Board, the governing board of the National Science Foundation

== Religion ==
- Miguel D'Escoto, Roman Catholic priest and former foreign minister; Nicaraguan American
- (Mexico) Patrick Flores, former Roman Catholic Archbishop of San Antonio, Texas; first Hispanic archbishop in the United States
- (Mexico) Elias Gabriel Galvan, Bishop of the United Methodist Church
- Miguel A. De La Torre, professor of social ethics and author of numerous books on Hispanic religiosity; Cuban American

== Architects ==
- Monica Ponce de Leon, first Hispanic architect to receive the National Design Award in Architecture from the Smithsonian; h

== Sports ==
=== Baseball ===
- (Brazil) Bo Bichette – MLB infielder
- (Cuba) J. D. Martinez – MLB designated hitter
- (Dominican Republic) Manny Machado – MLB third baseman
- (Dominican Republic) David Ortiz – Hall of Fame designated hitter; naturalized U.S. citizen
- (Dominican Republic) Albert Pujols – MLB first baseman and LIDOM manager; naturalized U.S. citizen
- (Dominican Republic) Manny Ramirez – MLB outfielder; naturalized U.S. citizen
- (Dominican Republic) Jose Reyes – MLB shortstop
- (Dominican Republic) Alex Rodriguez – MLB infielder
- (Dominican Republic) Alfonso Soriano – MLB and NPB second baseman
- (Dominican Republic) Austin Wells – MLB catcher
- (Mexico) Frank Arellanes – MLB pitcher
- (Mexico) Jorge Cantú – MLB infielder
- (Mexico) Eric Chavez – MLB third baseman
- (Mexico) Chad Cordero – MLB relief pitcher
- (Mexico) Pat Corrales – MLB catcher and manager
- (Mexico) Jarren Duran – MLB outfielder
- (Mexico) Johnny Estrada – MLB catcher
- (Mexico) Andre Ethier – MLB outfielder
- (Mexico) Brian Fuentes – MLB relief pitcher, 3 time All-Star
- (Mexico) Mike Garcia – MLB pitcher; partially of Gabrieleño descent
- (Mexico) Nomar Garciaparra – MLB infielder
- (Mexico) Adrian Gonzalez – MLB infielder
- (Mexico) Eddie Guardado – MLB relief pitcher
- (Mexico) Adam LaRoche – MLB first baseman
- (Mexico) Andy LaRoche – MLB infielder
- (Mexico) Evan Longoria – MLB infielder
- (Mexico) Sid Monge – MLB relief pitcher, All Star
- (Mexico) Carlos Muñiz – MLB relief pitcher
- (Mexico) Sandy Nava – first Mexican American player in the Major Leagues, infielder
- (Mexico) Jesse Orosco – MLB relief pitcher
- (Mexico) Jorge Orta – MLB second baseman
- (Mexico) Manny Parra – MLB pitcher
- (Mexico) Óliver Pérez – New York Mets Pitcher
- (Mexico) Rich Rodriguez – MLB pitcher
- (Mexico) Carlos Quentin – MLB outfielder
- (Mexico) Omar Quintanilla – MLB shortstop
- (Mexico) Horacio Ramírez – MLB pitcher
- (Mexico) Rudy Regalado – MLB infielder
- (Mexico) Anthony Reyes – MLB pitcher
- (Mexico) Freddy Sanchez – MLB infielder
- (Mexico) Rowdy Tellez – MLB first baseman
- (Mexico) Alek Thomas – MLB outfielder
- (Mexico) Mike Torrez – MLB pitcher
- (Mexico) Fernando Viña – MLB second baseman
- (Mexico) Ted Williams – Hall of Fame outfielder and manager
- (Mexico) Michael Young – MLB infielder
- (Nicaragua) Marvin Benard – MLB player; Nicaraguan American
- (Nicaragua) Dennis Martínez – MLB pitcher; pitched a perfect game in 1991
- (Nicaragua) Mark Vientos – MLB infielder
- (Panama) Logan Allen – MLB pitcher
- (Puerto Rico) Nolan Arenado – MLB third baseman
- (Puerto Rico) Carlos Beltrán – Hall of Fame outfielder
- (Puerto Rico) Hiram Bithorn – first Puerto Rican MLB player; pitcher
- (Puerto Rico) Orlando Cepeda – Hall of Fame first baseman
- (Puerto Rico) Roberto Clemente – Hall of Fame outfielder
- (Puerto Rico) Carlos Delgado – MLB first baseman
- (Puerto Rico) Edwin Díaz – MLB relief pitcher
- (Puerto Rico) Juan González – MLB outfielder
- (Puerto Rico) Seth Lugo – MLB pitcher
- (Puerto Rico) Yadier Molina – MLB catcher and LVBP manager
- (Puerto Rico) Iván Rodríguez – Hall of Fame catcher
- (Spain) Lefty Gomez – Hall of Fame pitcher
- (Spain) Keith Hernandez – MLB first baseman
- (Spain) Buck Martinez – MLB catcher, manager, and commentator

=== Basketball ===
- (Argentina) Manu Ginobili, NBA player
- (Argentina) Luis Scola, NBA player
- (Argentina) Fabricio Oberto, NBA player
- (Argentina) Carlos Delfino, NBA player
- (Argentina) Wálter Herrmann, NBA player
- (Argentina) Andres Nocioni, NBA player
- (Cuba) Al Cueto, NBA player
- (Cuba) Andres Guibert, NBA player
- (Cuba) Gilbert Arenas, NBA player
- (Cuba) Lazaro Borrell, NBA player
- (Cuba) Rebecca Lobo, WNBA player
- (Cuba) Brook Lopez, NBA player
- (Cuba) Robin Lopez, NBA player
- (Dominican Republic) Francisco García, NBA player
- (Dominican Republic) Al Horford, NBA player
- (Dominican Republic) Tito Horford, NBA player
- (Dominican Republic) Charlie Villanueva, NBA player
- (Dominican Republic) Luis Flores, NBA player
- (Dominican Republic) Felipe López, NBA player
- (Dominican Republic) Karl-Anthony Towns, NBA player
- (Mexico) Eduardo Najera, NBA player
- (Mexico) Earl Watson, NBA player
- (Mexico) Mark Aguirre, NBA player
- (Mexico) Horacio Llamas, NBA player
- (Panama) Rolando Blackman, NBA player; Panamanian American
- (Panama) Ruben Garces, NBA player; Panamanian American
- (Panama) Stuart Gray, NBA player; Panamanian American
- (Puerto Rico) Carmelo Anthony, NBA player
- (Puerto Rico) Carlos Arroyo, NBA player
- (Puerto Rico) J. J. Barea, NBA player
- (Puerto Rico) Guillermo Diaz, NBA player
- (Puerto Rico) Butch Lee, NBA player
- (Puerto Rico) Jose "Piculin" Ortiz, NBA player
- (Puerto Rico) Peter John Ramos, NBA player
- (Puerto Rico) Ramon Rivas, NBA player
- (Puerto Rico) Daniel Santiago, NBA player
- (Uruguay) Esteban Batista, NBA player
- (Venezuela) Trevor Ariza, NBA player
- (Venezuela) Óscar Torres, NBA player
- (Venezuela) Carl Herrera, NBA player

=== Boxing ===
- (Mexico) Paulie Ayala – world champion boxer
- (Mexico) Gaby Canizales – bantamweight world champion boxer
- (Mexico) Orlando Canizales – bantamweight world champion boxer
- (Mexico) Michael Carbajal
- (Mexico) Bobby Chacon – boxer
- (Mexico) Rocky Juarez
- Diego Corrales – super featherweight and lightweight champion; Mexican-Colombian American
- (Mexico) Juan Díaz – WBA and WBO and IBF world lightweight champion
- (Mexico) Robert Guerrero – boxer, current IBF featherweight champion
- (Mexico) Genaro Hernandez – boxer, super featherweight champion
- (Mexico) Robert Garcia – boxer, IBF featherweight title
- (Mexico) Delia Gonzalez – boxer
- (Mexico) Paul Gonzales – boxer
- (Mexico) Genaro Hernandez – boxer, super featherweight champion
- (Mexico) Oscar De La Hoya – boxer, promoter
- David Obregon – professional boxer; Nicaraguan American
- (Mexico) Manuel Ortiz (boxer) – professional boxer
- (Mexico) Sergio Mora – boxer
- (Puerto Rico) John Ruiz – boxer
- (Mexico) Mia St. John – boxer
- (Mexico) Johnny Tapia – boxer
- (Mexico) Fernando Vargas – boxer
- (Puerto Rico) Miguel Cotto – boxer
- (Puerto Rico) Wilfredo Gómez – boxer
- (Puerto Rico) Wilfred Benítez – boxer
- (Puerto Rico) Héctor Camacho – boxer
- (Puerto Rico) Edwin Rosario – boxer
- (Puerto Rico) Juan Manuel Lopez – boxer
- (Puerto Rico) Iván Calderón – boxer
- (Puerto Rico) Félix Trinidad – boxer
- (Cuba) Yuriorkis Gamboa – boxer
- (Cuba) Yan Bartelemí – boxer
- (Cuba) Kid Chocolate – boxer
- (Cuba) José Nápoles – boxer
- (Cuba) Kid Gavilan – boxer
- (Cuba) Joel Casamayor – boxer
- (Cuba) Guillermo Rigondeaux – boxer
- (Mexico) Canelo Álvarez – Mexican professional boxer

=== American Football ===
- Raul Allegre – NFL placekicker
- Tony Casillas – retired NFL defensive lineman
- Tom Fears – NFL wide receiver; Mexican American
- Tom Flores – NFL coach
- Jeff Garcia – football quarterback
- Joe Kapp – retired NFL quarterback; Mexican American
- J. P. Losman – NFL quarterback; Mexican American
- Max Montoya – retired NFL guard
- Knowshon Moreno – NFL running back (Denver Broncos); Mexican American
- Zeke Moreno – former NFL linebacker
- Anthony Muñoz – retired NFL offensive guard, member of Pro Football Hall of Fame; Mexican American
- Jim Plunkett – quarterback; Mexican American
- Tony Romo – quarterback (Dallas Cowboys); Mexican American
- Mark Sanchez – quarterback (New York Jets); Mexican American
- Jose Cortez – football placekicker
- Roberto Garza – offensive line left guard (Chicago Bears); Mexican American

=== Golf ===
- Nancy Lopez – Mexican American
- Tony Lema
- Chi Chi Rodriguez – Puerto Rican (American)
- Lee Trevino – Mexican American
- Camilo Villegas – Colombian American
- Lorena Ochoa – Mexican American

=== Gymnastics ===
- Jordan Chiles – artistic gymnast, Olympic gold and silver medalist
- Laurie Hernandez – artistic gymnast, Olympic silver medalist; Puerto Rican
- Hezly Rivera – artistic gymnast, Olympic gold medalist; Dominican American

=== Mixed martial artists ===
- (Mexico) Paul Buentello – UFC, Mixed martial arts
- (Mexico) Carlos Condit – UFC / Mixed martial arts fighter
- (Mexico) Nathan Diaz – Mixed martial artist
- (Mexico) Nick Diaz – UFC / mixed martial arts
- (Mexico) Efraín Escudero – UFC / Mixed martial arts fighter
- (Mexico) Leonard Garcia – WEC, Mixed martial arts
- Roger Huerta – mixed martial arts fighter; Mexican-Salvadoran American
- (Mexico) Juanito Ibarra – Mixed martial arts fighter/boxing trainer
- Diana López – Taekwondo
- Mark López – Taekwondo
- Ruby Lopez – Taekwondo
- Steven López – Taekwondo, 2 time gold medalist, the most decorated Taekwondo athlete in the history of the sport
- (Mexico) Gilbert Melendez – UFC / Mixed martial arts fighter
- (Mexico) Tito Ortiz – UFC / Mixed martial arts
- (Mexico) Damacio Page – UFC / Mixed martial arts fighter
- (Mexico) Manny Rodriguez – Mixed martial arts fighter/heavyweight champion
- (Mexico) Diego Sanchez – UFC / Mixed martial arts
- (Mexico) Eddie Sanchez – Mixed martial arts fighter
- (Mexico) Frank Shamrock – UFC / Mixed martial arts fighter
- (Mexico) Mia St. John – Taekwondo champion and boxer
- (Mexico) Miguel Torres – WEC / Mixed martial arts fighter
- (Mexico) Charlie Valencia – Mixed martial arts fighter
- Javier Vazquez – WEC / Mixed martial arts fighter
- (Mexico) Cain Velasquez – UFC / Mixed martial arts fighter
- (Mexico) Joey Villasenor – Mixed martial arts fighter

=== Soccer ===
- Esteban Arias – defender C.D. Chivas USA; Mexican American
- Chris Armas – soccer player; Puerto Rican
- Ivan Becerra – soccer forward for Columbus Crew; Mexican American
- Carlos Bocanegra – MLS soccer; Mexican American
- Cuauhtemoc Blanco – defender Chicago Fire; Mexican American
- Jonathan Bornstein – defender and midfielder C.D. Chivas USA; Mexican American
- Jose Burciaga Jr. – Major League Soccer; Mexican American
- Edgar Eduardo Castillo – defender Santos Laguna; Mexican American
- Ramiro Corrales – San Jose Earthquakes; Mexican American
- Jorge Flores – C.D. Chivas USA; Mexican American
- José Francisco Torres – midfielder Pachuca; Mexican American
- Francisco Gomez – USL Premier Development League; Mexican American
- Herculez Gomez – Colorado Rapids Major League Soccer; Mexican American
- Miguel Gonzalez – New England Revolution Major League Soccer; Mexican American
- Sonny Guadarrama – midfielder for Atlético Morelia; Mexican American
- Diego Gutierrez – midfielder Major League Soccer; Colombian American
- Brad Guzan – goalkeeper MLS Chivas USA
- Daniel Hernandez – Major League Soccer; Mexican American
- Christian Jimenez – MLS player; Mexican American
- Freddy Juarez – defender Carolina RailHawks; Mexican American
- Rodrigo López – midfielder C.D. Chivas USA; Mexican American
- Antonio Martínez – midfielder C.D. Chivas USA; Mexican American
- Pablo Mastroeni – defensive midfielder Colorado Rapids
- Mike Muñoz – midfielder USL First Division; Mexican American
- Michael Orozco Fiscal – defender for San Luis F.C.; Mexican American
- Jesús Padilla – forward C.D. Guadalajara; Mexican American
- Shea Salinas – forward San Jose Earthquakes; Mexican American
- Orlando Perez – C.D. Chivas USA; Puerto Rican
- Antonio de la Torre – defender for the Atlanta Silverbacks USL First Division; Mexican American
- Arturo Torres – soccer player; Mexican American
- Tab Ramos – soccer player; Uruguayan American
- José Francisco Torres – midfielder Primera Division de Mexico; Mexican American
- Martin Vasquez – retired midfielder, assistant coach C.D. Chivas USA; Mexican American

=== Wrestlers ===
- Aaron Aguilera – professional wrestler; Mexican American
- The Bella Twins – professional wrestlers; Mexican American
- Chavo Guerrero Jr. – professional wrestler, WCW, ECW and WWE; Mexican American
- Eddie Guerrero – professional wrestler, WWE; Mexican American
- Hector Guerrero – professional wrestler; Mexican American
- Mando Guerrero – professional wrestler; Mexican American
- Gino Hernandez – professional wrestler
- Candice Michelle – professional wrestler; Costa Rican American
- Rey Mysterio Jr. – professional wrestler, WWE; Mexican American
- Melina Perez – professional wrestler; Mexican American
- Cody Rhodes – professional wrestler; Cuban American
- Milena Roucka – professional wrestler; Costa Rican American
- Tito Santana – professional wrestler, WWF; Mexican American
- José Luis Jair Soria – professional wrestler; Mexican American
- Enrique Torres – professional wrestler; Mexican American
- Eve Torres – professional wrestler, WWE; Nicaraguan American
- Alicia Fox – professional wrestler, WWE; Dominican–Panamanian American

=== Other sports ===
- Benjamin Agosto – figure skater
- Tony Alva – legendary skateboarder; Mexican American
- Rudy Galindo – figure skater
- Scott Gomez – hockey player
- Pancho Gonzalez – tennis player; Mexican American
- Roberto Guerrero – racing driver
- George Hincapie – road bicyclist; Colombian American
- Juan Pablo Montoya – car racer (Formula One and NASCAR)
- Derek Parra – speed skater, Olympic gold medalist; Mexican American
- Stacy Peralta – skateboarder; Mexican American
- Paul Rodriguez Jr. – professional skateboarder; Mexican American
- Alberto Salazar – long-distance runner
- Naya Tapper – rugby, Olympic bronze medalist; Puerto Rican
- Ismael Valenzuela – jockey, Kentucky Derby winner
- Patrick Valenzuela – jockey, Kentucky Derby and Preakness winner

== Politics ==
=== Federal ===
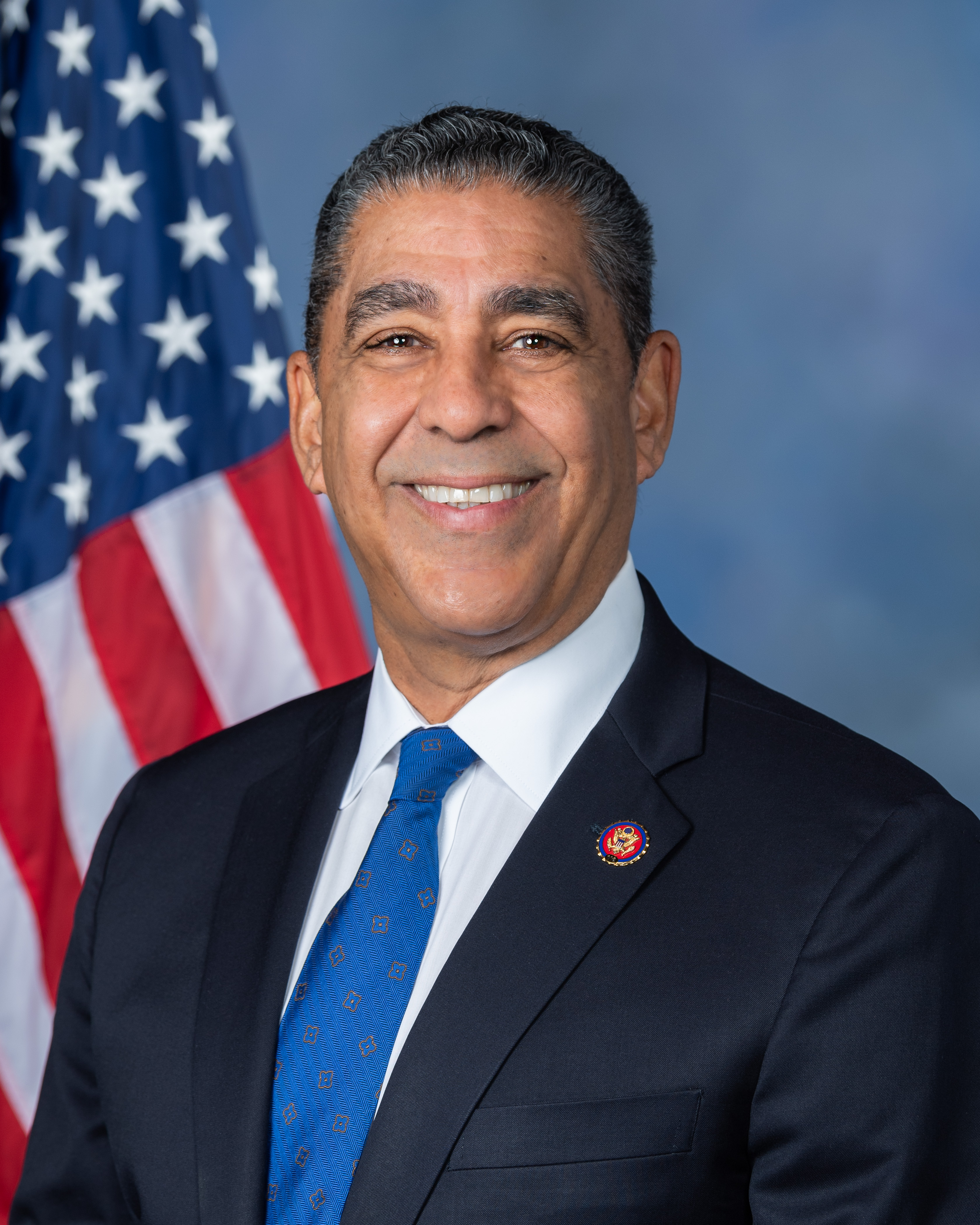
Adriano Espaillat

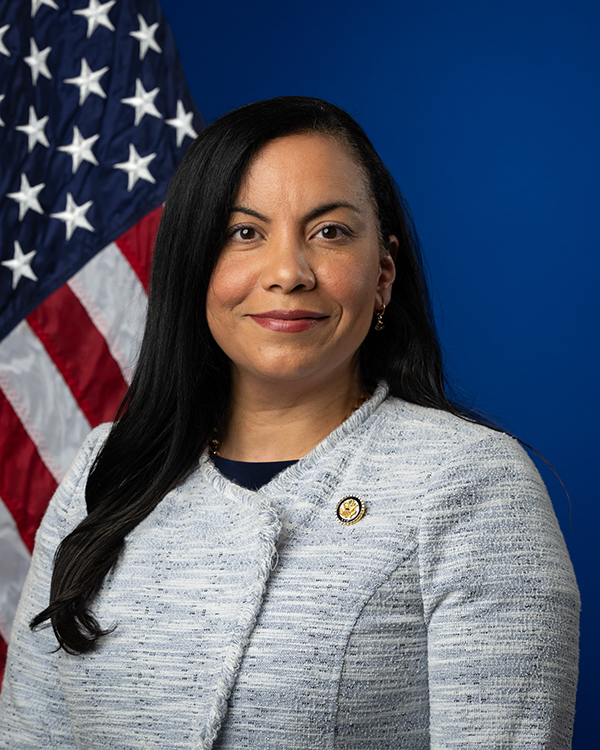
Analilia Mejia

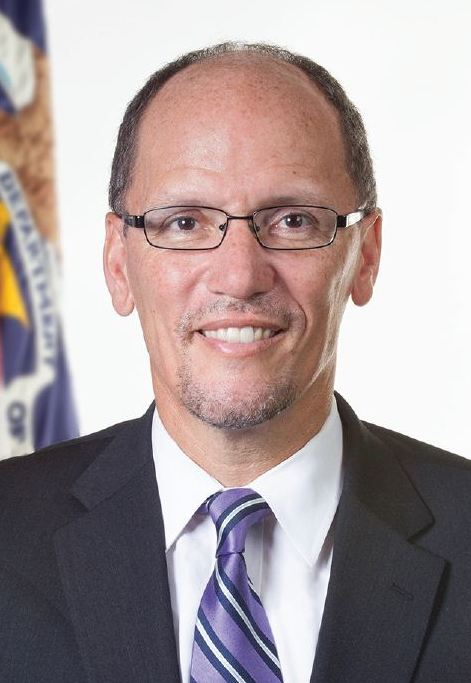
Thomas Perez

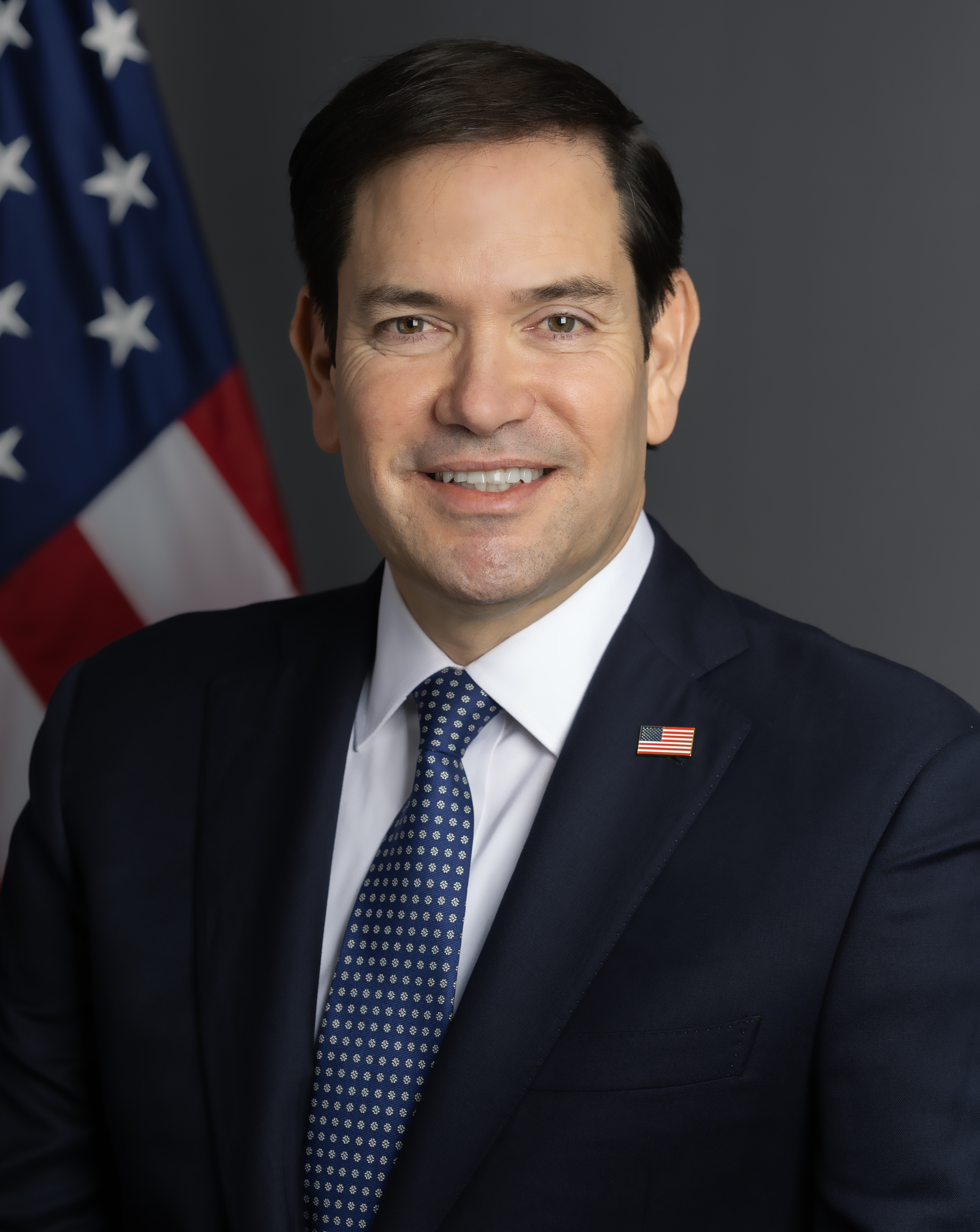
Marco Rubio

- (Colombia) (Mexico) Ruben Gallego – U.S. Senator from Arizona
- (Colombia) (Dominican Republic) Analilia Mejia – U.S. Representative from New Jersey
- (Colombia) Bernie Moreno – U.S. Senator from Ohio
- (Colombia) Scott Perry – U.S. Representative from Pennsylvania
- (Cuba) Ted Cruz – U.S. Senator from Texas
- (Cuba) Mario Díaz-Balart – U.S. Representative from Florida
- (Cuba) Maxwell Frost – U.S. Representative from Florida
- (Cuba) Carlos A. Giménez – U.S. Representative from Florida
- (Cuba) Nicole Malliotakis – U.S. Representative from New York
- (Cuba) Mel Martínez – U.S. Senator from Florida
- (Cuba) Bob Menendez – U.S. Senator from New Jersey
- (Cuba) Rob Menendez – U.S. Representative from New Jersey
- (Cuba) Alex Mooney – U.S. Representative from West Virginia
- (Cuba) Marco Rubio – 72nd U.S. Secretary of State, U.S. Senator from Florida
- (Cuba) María Elvira Salazar – U.S. Representative from Florida
- (Dominican Republic) Adriano Espaillat – U.S. Representative from New York
- (Dominican Republic) Tom Perez – 26th U.S. Secretary of Labor, chair of the Democratic National Committee
- (Guatemala) Delia Ramirez – U.S. Representative from Illinois
- (Guatemala) Norma Torres – U.S. Representative from California
- (Mexico) Pete Aguilar – U.S. Representative from California
- (Mexico) Nanette Barragán – U.S. Representative from California
- (Mexico) Salud Carbajal – U.S. Representative from California
- (Mexico) Tony Cárdenas – U.S. Representative from California
- (Mexico) Greg Casar – U.S. Representative from Texas
- (Mexico) Joaquin Castro – U.S. Representative from Texas
- (Mexico) Julian Castro – 16th U.S. Secretary of Housing and Urban Development
- (Mexico) Lori Chavez-DeRemer – 30th U.S. Secretary of Labor, U.S. Representative from Oregon
- (Mexico) Juan Ciscomani – U.S. Representative from Arizona
- (Mexico) Gil Cisneros – U.S. Representative from California
- (Mexico) Lou Correa – U.S. Representative from California
- (Mexico) Catherine Cortez Masto – U.S. Senator from Nevada
- (Mexico) Henry Cuellar – U.S. Representative from Texas
- (Mexico) Monica De La Cruz – U.S. Representative from Texas
- (Mexico) Veronica Escobar – U.S. Representative from Texas
- (Mexico) Gabe Evans – U.S. Representative from Colorado
- (Mexico) Chuy García – U.S. Representative from Illinois
- (Mexico) Mike Garcia – U.S. Representative from California
- (Mexico) Sylvia Garcia – U.S. Representative from Texas
- (Mexico) Marie Gluesenkamp Perez – U.S. Representative from Washington
- (Mexico) Jimmy Gomez – U.S. Representative from California
- (Mexico) Vicente Gonzalez – U.S. Representative from Texas
- (Mexico) Adelita Grijalva – U.S. Representative from Arizona
- Teresa Leger Fernandez – U.S. Representative from New Mexico
- (Mexico) Mike Levin – U.S. Representative from California
- (Mexico) Sam Liccardo – U.S. Representative from California
- Ben Ray Luján – U.S. Senator from New Mexico
- (Mexico) Anna Paulina Luna – U.S. Representative from Florida
- (Mexico) Brian Mast – U.S. Representative from Florida
- (Mexico) Alex Padilla – U.S. Senator from California
- (Mexico) Ken Salazar – 50th U.S. Secretary of the Interior, U.S. Senator from Colorado
- (Mexico) Emily Randall – U.S. Representative from Washington
- (Mexico) Rosa Gumataotao Rios – 23rd Treasurer of the United States
- (Mexico) Luz Rivas – U.S. Representative from California
- (Mexico) Raul Ruiz – U.S. Representative from California
- (Mexico) Andrea Salinas – U.S. Representative from Oregon
- (Mexico) Linda Sánchez – U.S. Representative from California
- (Mexico) Juan Vargas – U.S. Representative from California
- Gabe Vasquez – U.S. Representative from New Mexico
- (Peru) Robert Garcia – U.S. Representative from California
- (Puerto Rico) Anthony D'Esposito – U.S. Representative from New York
- (Puerto Rico) Alexandria Ocasio-Cortez – U.S. Representative from New York
- (Puerto Rico) Nellie Pou – U.S. Representative from New Jersey
- (Puerto Rico) Darren Soto – U.S. Representative from Florida
- (Puerto Rico) Ritchie Torres – U.S. Representative from New York
- (Puerto Rico) Nydia Velázquez – U.S. Representative from New York
- (El Salvador) John E. Sununu – U.S. Senator from New Hampshire

=== State ===
- (Colombia) (Mexico) (Venezuela) Antonio Delgado – Lieutenant Governor of New York
- (Cuba) Ernesto Gonzalez – member of the New Hampshire House of Representatives
- (Cuba) Wes Moore – 63rd Governor of Maryland
- (Cuba) Jeanette Nuñez – 20th Lieutenant Governor of Florida
- (Dominican Republic) Nelson Castro – member of the New York State Assembly
- (Dominican Republic) Lorraine Cortés-Vázquez – 63rd Secretary of State of New York
- (Dominican Republic) Marcos Devers – member of the Massachusetts House of Representatives
- (Dominican Republic) Grace Diaz – member of the Rhode Island House of Representatives
- (Dominican Republic) Rafael Espinal – member of the New York State Assembly
- (Dominican Republic) Guillermo Linares – member of the New York State Assembly
- (Dominican Republic) Sabina Matos – 70th Lieutenant Governor of Rhode Island
- (Dominican Republic) Joseline Peña-Melnyk – member of the Maryland House of Delegates
- (Dominican Republic) (Puerto Rico) Cesar A. Perales – 65th Secretary of State of New York
- Michelle Lujan Grisham – 32nd Governor of New Mexico
- Susana Martinez – 31st Governor of New Mexico
- Howie Morales – 30th Lieutenant Governor of New Mexico
- (Mexico) Anthony Rendon – Speaker of the California State Assembly
- Bill Richardson – 30th Governor of New Mexico
- (Mexico) Robert A. Rivas – Speaker of the California State Assembly
- (Mexico) Brian Sandoval – 29th Governor of Nevada
- (Uruguay) Joe Vogel – member of the Maryland House of Delegates

=== Local ===
- (Cuba) Francis Suarez – mayor of Miami
- (Dominican Republic) Alex Blanco – mayor of Passaic, New Jersey
- (Dominican Republic) (Puerto Rico) Fernando Cabrera – New York City Council member
- (Dominican Republic) Julissa Ferreras – New York City Council member
- (Dominican Republic) William Lantigua – mayor of Lawrence, Massachusetts
- (Dominican Republic) Miguel Martinez – New York City Council member
- (Dominican Republic) Ydanis Rodríguez – New York City Council member
- (Dominican Republic) Angel Taveras – mayor of Providence, Rhode Island
- (Mexico) Blanca Alvarado – member of the Santa Clara County Board of Supervisors
- (Mexico) Frances Garcia – mayor of Hutchinson, Kansas
- (Mexico) Norma García – mayor of Mercedes, Texas
- (Mexico) Oscar Leeser – mayor of El Paso, Texas
- (Mexico) Regina Romero – mayor of Tucson, Arizona
- (Mexico) Antonio Villaraigosa – mayor of Los Angeles
- (Puerto Rico) Todd Gloria – mayor of San Diego

=== Others ===
- (Dominican Republic) Geovanny Vicente – political strategist
- (Mexico) Nick Fuentes – white nationalist and political commentator

== Models ==
- (Puerto Rico) Melanie Iglesias

== Scientists ==
- Joseph M. Acabá, American astronaut of Puerto Rican descent
- Luis Walter Alvarez (1911–1988), American experimental physicist, inventor, and professor who was awarded the Nobel Prize in Physics in 1968 for development of the hydrogen bubble chamber
- Walter Clement Alvarez medicine doctor, author of books on medicine
- Walter Alvarez, geologist, postulator of the asteroid-impact theory for the Cretaceous-Tertiary extinction event
- Serena M. Auñón, astronaut
- Albert Baez, physicist
- John C. Baez, mathematical physicist
- Elsa Salazar Cade, Mexican American entomologist and educator
- Fernando Caldeiro, Argentine American astronaut
- Franklin Chang-Diaz, Costa Rican American astronaut
- France A. Córdova, former NASA chief scientist (Mexican American)
- Frank J. Duarte, laser physicist and author
- Gerard Roland Vela, microbiologist
- Martha E. Bernal (1931–2001), Mexican-American clinical psychologist, first Latina to receive a psychology PhD in the United States
- Antonia Novello (b. 1944), Puerto Rican physician, 14th Surgeon General of the United States, first woman and first Hispanic to hold the position
- Sarah Stewart (1905–1976), Mexican-American microbiologist; discovered the Polyomavirus
- Helen Rodríguez Trías (1929–2001), Puerto Rican American pediatrician, advocate for women's reproductive rights
- Melba J. T. Vasquez (b. 1951), counseling psychologist and first Latina president of the American Psychological Association
- Lydia Villa-Komaroff (b. 1947), Mexican-American cellular biologist; third Mexican American woman in the United States to receive a PhD in the sciences
- Rodolfo Llinas (b. 1934), Colombian American neuroscientist
- John Garcia, psychologist
- Sidney M. Gutierrez, Mexican American astronaut
- Jose Hernández, Mexican American astronaut
- Scarlin Hernandez (b. 1991), Dominican-American astronautical engineer
- Christopher Loria, astronaut
- Todd Martinez, Theoretical chemist and MacArthur Fellow
- Mario Molina, Nobel Prize-winning chemist (Mexican American)
- Carlos I. Noriega, Peruvian American astronaut
- Ellen Ochoa, Mexican American astronaut
- John D. Olivas, Mexican American astronaut
- George D. Zamka, Colombian American astronaut

== Journalism ==
- (Catalonia) Jacqueline Alemany, journalist
- (Ecuador) Cecilia Alvear, television journalist; Ecuadorian American
- (Puerto Rico) María Celeste Arrarás, journalist and TV news presenter
- (Colombia) Julie Banderas, TV news presenter
- (Puerto Rico) (Cuba) Bárbara Bermudo, journalist and TV news presenter
- (Colombia) Ilia Calderón, television journalist; Colombian American
- (Mexico) Rachel Campos-Duffy, television news host
- (Mexico) María Antonieta Collins, journalist and TV news presenter
- (Cuba) Jose Diaz-Balart, journalist and TV news presenter
- (Puerto Rico) Carmen Dominicci, television journalist
- (Ecuador) Patricio G. Espinoza, freelance journalist; Ecuadorian American
- (Mexico) Giselle Fernández, television journalist
- (Mexico) Luis de la Garza, TV and radio host
- (Puerto Rico) Juan Gonzalez, investigative journalist
- (Ecuador) Cork Graham, imprisoned in Vietnam for illegally entering the country while looking for treasure buried by Captain Kidd; Ecuadorian American
- (Puerto Rico) Kimberly Guilfoyle, TV news presenter
- (Mexico) Maria Hinojosa, journalist
- Bryan Llenas, television news reporter
- (Puerto Rico) Lynda Lopez, journalist and TV news presenter
- (Nicaragua) Maria Molina, television meteorologist and journalist
- (Puerto Rico) Natalie Morales, television journalist
- (Cuba) Soledad O'Brien, newscaster (Cuban from her maternal side)
- (Mexico) Raul Peimbert, television journalist
- (Honduras) Satcha Pretto, journalist and television news presenter; Honduran American
- (Mexico) John Quiñones, television journalist
- (Mexico) Jorge Ramos, journalist and TV news presenter
- (Dominican Republic) Birmania Ríos, television journalist; Dominican American
- (Puerto Rico) Geraldo Rivera, talk-show host, journalist
- (Cuba) Maggie Rodriguez television journalist
- (Panama) Michele Ruiz newscaster; Panamanian American journalist and TV news presenter
- (Mexico) María Elena Salinas, journalist and TV news presenter
- (Cuba) Maria Elvira Salazar, journalist and TV news presenter
- (Mexico) Rubén Salazar, legendary slain journalist
- (Mexico) Lauren Sánchez, newscaster
- (Cuba) Rick Sanchez, newscaster
- (Cuba) Cristina Saralegui, journalist and TV show host
- (Uruguay) Pedro Sevcec, journalist and TV news presenter
- (Puerto Rico) Carley Shimkus, TV news presenter
- (Puerto Rico) Ray Suarez, television and radio journalist
- (Guatemala) Hector Tobar, Pulitzer Prize-winning journalist; Guatemalan American
- (Puerto Rico) Elizabeth Vargas, television journalist

== Literature ==
- Mercedes de Acosta (1893–1968) – poet and playwright, also known for her lesbian affairs with Greta Garbo and Marlene Dietrich.
- Felipe Alfau (1902–1999) – Catalan novelist and poet.
- Rudolfo Anaya (1937–2020) – Mexican-American author of Bless Me, Ultima
- Jaime de Angulo (1887–1950) – linguist, novelist, and ethnomusicologist in the western United States. He was born in Paris of Spanish parents.
- Estelle Anna Lewis (1824–1880) – United States poet and dramatist. She was of English and Spanish descent.
- Ivan Argüelles – American poet and brother of Jose Argüelles.
- Alexander Argüelles – American linguist and son of Ivan Argüelles.
- Miguel Algarín (1941–2020) – Puerto Rican author and co-founder of the Nuyorican Poets Café
- Julia Alvarez – writer; Dominican American
- Jimmy Santiago Baca – poet; Mexican American
- Hilario Barrero – Spanish poet and teacher.
- Stephen Vincent Benét (July 22, 1898 – March 13, 1943) – American author, poet, short story writer, and novelist.
- Giannina Braschi (b. 1953) – Puerto Rican author of Spanglish classic novel Yo-Yo Boing!
- Fray Angelico Chavez – poet, historian, painter
- Sandra Cisneros (b. 1954) – Mexican-American author of The House on Mango Street
- Judith Ortiz Cofer (1952–2016) – Puerto Rican author of Silent Dancing: A Partial Remembrance of a Puerto Rican Childhood
- Angie Cruz (b. 1972) – Dominican-American author of Let It Rain Coffee
- Nelson Denis (b. 1954) – Puerto Rican author of War Against All Puerto Ricans and former New York State Assemblyman
- Junot Díaz – writer; Dominican American
- Francisco Goldman – writer; Guatemalan American
- Manuel Gonzales (1913–1993) – Spanish born-American Disney comics artist.
- Jessica Hagedorn – Filipino-American playwright, writer, poet, storyteller, musician, and multimedia performance artist, to a Scots-Irish-French-Filipino mother and a Filipino-Spanish father.
- Oscar Hijuelos – Cuban-American writer
- Amber L. Hollibaugh – American writer, film-maker and political activist. She is the daughter of a Romany father of Spanish descent and an Irish mother.
- Christianne Meneses Jacobs – publisher of the only U.S. Spanish-language children's magazine; Nicaraguan American
- Andrew Jolivétte – American author and lecturer of Spanish partially descent.
- Lynda Lopez – author and journalist based in New York City
- Patricia Santos Marcantonio – Mexican-American novelist and short story writer
- Odón Betanzos Palacios (1925–2007) – poet, novelist and Spanish literary critic.
- Carmen M. Pursifull – English-language free verse poet and former New York City Latin dance and Latin American music figure in the 1950s. She is of Puerto Rican and Spanish descent.
- Anaïs Nin – born Angela Anaïs Juana Antolina Rosa Edelmira Nin y Culmell, was an American author born to Spanish-Cuban parents in France, where she was also raised.
- Horacio Peña – professor, writer, and poet; Nicaraguan American
- George Rabasa – American writer and author
- Matthew Randazzo V – American true crime writer and historian. He is of Sicilian-American, Isleño, and Cajun descent.
- Alberto Rios (b. 1952) – Mexican-American poet, Arizona's first poet first state poet laureate
- Benjamin Alire Sáenz (b. 1954) – Mexican-American author of Everything Begins and Ends at the Kentucky Club
- George Santayana (1863–1952) – Spanish born, philosopher, essayist, poet, and novelist.
- Luis Senarens (1865–1939) – Cuban-American science fiction author of The Frank Reade Library, the most popular sci-fi Dime Novel series of the 19th century.
- Sergio Troncoso (b. 1961) – Mexican-American author of The Last Tortilla and Other Stories and Crossing Borders: Personal Essays
- Geovanny Vicente – political strategist, international consultant and columnist who writes for CNN.
- Jose Yglesias (November 29, 1919 – November 7, 1995) – American novelist and journalist. Yglesias was born in the Ybor City section of Tampa, Florida, and was of Cuban and Spanish descent. His father was from Galicia.
- Rafael Yglesias (born May 12, 1954, New York) – American novelist and screenwriter. His parents were the novelists Jose Yglesias and Helen Yglesias.

== United States Armed Forces ==
- Joseph B. Avilés (1897–1990), served in the U.S. Navy and later in the Coast Guard; in 1925, became the first Hispanic Chief Petty Officer in the US Coast Guard; Puerto Rican, lived in Maryland
- Rafael Celestino Benítez (1917–1999), highly decorated submarine commander who led the rescue effort of the crew members of the USS Cochino during the Cold War
- Jo-Ann Feigofsky Burdian - First female Hispanic flag officer in the United States Coast Guard. Currently Vice Admiral (2026)
- José M. Cabanillas (1901–1979), Puerto Rican executive Officer of the USS Texas, which participated in the invasions of North Africa and the Battle of Normandy (D-Day) during World War II; died in Virginia
- Iván Castro, U.S. Army officer who has continued serving on active duty in the Special Forces despite losing his eyesight; parents are Puerto Rican
- Joseph H. De Castro (1844–1892), first Hispanic American to be awarded the Medal of Honor
- Richard Carmona, American physician and public health administrator
- Adolfo Fernández Cavada, captain in the Union Army during the American Civil War who later served as Commander-in-Chief of the Cinco Villas during Cuba's Ten Year War
- Federico Fernández Cavada, colonel in the Union Army during the American Civil War and later Commander-in-Chief of all the Cuban forces during Cuba's Ten Year War
- Mercedes O. Cubria, lieutenant colonel in the U.S. Army; first Cuban-born female officer in the US Army
- Julius Peter Garesché, lieutenant colonel in the Union Army who served as Chief of Staff, with the rank of Lieutenant Colonel to Maj. Gen. William S. Rosecrans
- Ambrosio José Gonzales, colonel in the Confederate Army during the American Civil War
- José Manuel Hernández, popular Venezuelan caudillo, army general, congressman, presidential candidate and cabinet member who was also involved in numerous insurrections. Lived in exile in US from 1911 to his death in 1921
- Narciso López, Venezuelan soldier and adventurer, known for four filibuster expeditions aimed at liberating Cuba from Spain in the 1850s
- Carmen Contreras-Bozak (1919–2017), first Hispanic to serve in the U.S. Women's Army Corps, where she served as an interpreter and in numerous administrative positions; Puerto Rican; lives in Tampa, Florida
- Linda García Cubero, former U.S. Air Force officer; of Mexican-American-Puerto Rican descent
- Rubén A. Cubero, highly decorated member of the U.S. Air Force; first Hispanic graduate of the US Air Force Academy to be named Dean of the Faculty of the academy; parents were Puerto Rican
- Alberto Díaz Jr., first Hispanic Director of the San Diego Naval District and Balboa Naval Hospital; Puerto Rican born and raised
- Rafael O'Ferrall, United States Army officer; first Hispanic of Puerto Rican descent to become the Deputy Commanding General for the Joint Task Force at Guantanamo Bay, Cuba
- Salvador E. Felices (1923–1987), first Puerto Rican to reach the rank of major general (two-star) in the U.S. Air Force; died in Florida
- Diego E. Hernández, retired US Navy officer; first Hispanic to be named Vice Commander, North American Aerospace Defense Command; Puerto Rican resident of Miami
- Lester Martínez López, MD, MPH (born 1955), first Hispanic to head the Army Medical and Research Command at Fort Detrick, Maryland
- Carlos Lozada (1946–1967) member of the U.S. Army; one of five Puerto Ricans who posthumously received the Medal of Honor for their actions in combat; Puerto Rican born, raised in New York City
- Ángel Méndez (1946–1967) U.S. Marine, posthumously awarded the Navy Cross
- Virgil Rasmuss Miller (1900–1968), U.S. Army officer who served as Regimental Commander of the 442d Regimental Combat Team, a unit composed of "Nisei" (second generation Americans of Japanese descent), during World War II
- Héctor Andrés Negroni, Puerto Rican historian, senior aerospace defense executive, author; first Puerto Rican graduate of the U.S. Air Force Academy; lives in Vienna, Virginia
- Antonia Novello, Puerto Rican physician and public health administrator; US Surgeon General
- María Inés Ortiz (1967–2007), first American nurse to die in combat during Operation Iraqi Freedom; first Army nurse to die in combat since the Vietnam War; parents were Puerto Rican

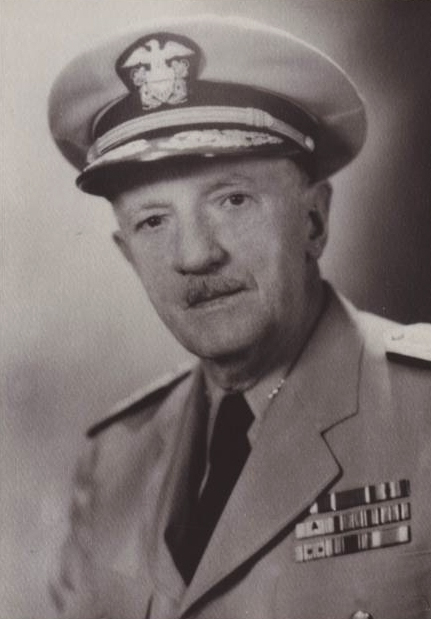
Rudolph W. Riefkohl

- José Antonio Páez, Venezuelan leader who fought the War of Independence. President of Venezuela once it was independent of the Gran Colombia (1830–1835; 1839–1843; 1861–1863). He lived in New York City during his years in exile and died there in 1873
- Patricia Spanic, captain in the US Army. She is sister of soap opera actress Gabriela Spanic.
- Erneido Oliva, major general; former deputy commander of the D.C. National Guard
- Marion Frederic Ramírez de Arellano (1913–1980), submarine commander in the US Navy; first Hispanic submarine commanding officer
- Frederick Lois Riefkohl (1889–1969), Puerto Rican officer in the U.S. Navy; first Puerto Rican to graduate from the U.S. Naval Academy and to be awarded the Navy Cross; lived and died in Florida
- Rudolph W. Riefkohl (1885–1950), U.S. Army officer; instrumental in helping the people of Poland overcome the 1919 typhus epidemic
- Pedro N. Rivera, retired Puerto Rican US Air Force officer; in 1994 became the first Hispanic medical commander in the Air Force; lives in Alexandria, Virginia
- Elmelindo Rodrigues Smith (1935–1967), U.S. Army soldier posthumously awarded the Medal of Honor for his actions in the Vietnam War; of Puerto Rican descent
- Augusto Rodríguez, Puerto Rican officer in the Union Army during the American Civil War; immigrated to the US in the 1850s
- Pedro Rodríguez (1912–1999), earned two Silver Stars within a seven-day period during the Korean War; Puerto Rican; died in Washington, D.C.
- Fernando E. Rodríguez Vargas (1888–1932), Puerto Rican odontologist (dentist), scientist and a major in the US Army; discovered the bacteria which causes cavities; died in Washington, D.C.
- Félix Rodríguez, U.S. Army helicopter pilot, former CIA officer known for his involvement in the Bay of Pigs Invasion and his involvement in the capture and interrogation of Che Guevara
- Lola Sánchez, Confederate spy during the American Civil War; played an instrumental role in the Confederate victory in the Battle of Horse Landing
- José Agustín Quintero, Cuban born Confederate diplomat to Mexico, based in Monterrey
- Loreta Janeta Velazquez (1842 – c. 1902), aka Lieutenant Harry Buford, Cuban-born woman who claimed that she masqueraded as a male Confederate soldier during the American Civil War
- Héctor E. Pagán, U.S. Army officer; first Hispanic of Puerto Rican descent to become Deputy Commanding General of the US Army John F. Kennedy Special Warfare Center and School at Fort Bragg, North Carolina
- José M. Portela, retired officer of the U.S. Air Force; served in the position of Assistant Adjutant General for Air while also serving as commander of the Puerto Rico Air National Guard
- Maritza Sáenz Ryan, U.S. Army officer; head of the Department of Law at the US Military Academy; first woman and first Hispanic West Point graduate to serve as an academic department head; Puerto Rican father, Spanish mother
- Héctor Santiago-Colón (1942–1968), one of five Puerto Ricans posthumously presented with the Medal of Honor, the highest military decoration awarded by the U.S.; Puerto Rican from New York
- Pedro del Valle (1893–1978), U.S. Marine Corps officer; first Hispanic to reach the rank of lieutenant general; in 1900 his family emigrated to the US and became US citizens
- Humbert Roque Versace (1937–1965), American U.S. Army officer of Puerto Rican-Italian descent; awarded the US' highest military decoration, the Medal of Honor, for his heroic actions while a prisoner of war during the Vietnam War

== Aviation ==
- (Argentina) Linda Pauwels – First Latina Captain and First Latina Check Airman at American Airlines

== See also ==
- List of Argentine Americans
- List of Bolivian Americans
- List of Brazilian Americans
- List of Colombian Americans
- List of Cuban Americans
- List of Dominican Americans
- List of Mexican Americans
- List of Nicaraguan Americans
- List of Salvadoran Americans
- List of Venezuelan Americans
- List of Spanish Americans
- List of Stateside Puerto Ricans
- History of Mexican Americans
- List of Hispanic and Latino Medal of Honor recipients
- Hispanic and Latino Admirals in the United States Navy
- Hispanics and Latinos in the United States Air Force
- Hispanics and Latinos in the United States Coast Guard
- Hispanics and Latinos in the United States Marine Corps
- Hispanics and Latinos in the United States Navy
- Hispanics and Latinos in the American Civil War
- Hispanic and Latino American writers
- List of Hispanic and Latin American Britons
