= James DeAnda =

American judge (1925–2006)

Chief Judge of the United States District Court for the Southern District of Texas
- In office 1988–1992
- Preceded by: John Virgil Singleton Jr.
- Succeeded by: Norman William Black

Judge of the United States District Court for the Southern District of Texas
- In office May 11, 1979 – October 1, 1992
- Appointed by: Jimmy Carter
- Preceded by: Seat established by 92 Stat. 1629
- Succeeded by: Nancy Atlas

Personal details
- Born: James DeAnda; August 21, 1925 Houston, Texas, U.S.
- Died: September 7, 2006 (aged 81) Traverse City, Michigan, U.S.
- Education: Texas A&M University (BA); University of Texas School of Law (LLB)

James DeAnda (August 21, 1925 – September 7, 2006) was a Mexican American attorney and United States district judge of the United States District Court for the Southern District of Texas, noted for his activities in defense of Hispanic civil rights, particularly as a plaintiff's attorney in Hernandez v. Texas.

== Early life and education ==
Born in Houston to Mexican immigrants, DeAnda's attendance at Texas A&M University was interrupted by World War II service in the United States Marine Corps in the Pacific. Graduating from Texas A&M with a Bachelor of Arts degree in 1948, he then received a Bachelor of Laws from the University of Texas School of Law in 1950. He was in private practice in Houston from 1951 to 1955 and in Corpus Christi from 1955 to 1979. In the early 1950s, he was on the plaintiff's team in Hernandez v. Texas, writing most of the briefs. In the late 1960s, he was among those who organized the Texas Rural Legal Assistance Organization and the Mexican American Legal Defense and Education Fund.

== Federal judicial service ==
On February 13, 1979, DeAnda was nominated by President Jimmy Carter to a new seat on the United States District Court for the Southern District of Texas created by 92 Stat. 1629. He was confirmed by the United States Senate on May 10, 1979, and received his commission on May 11, 1979. He served as chief judge from 1988 until retiring from the bench on October 1, 1992. After retirement, he returned to private practice in Houston until 2005.

== Discrimination ==
DeAnda reported later in life that he had not faced much discrimination during his schooling, possibly due to his more Mediterranean-sounding surname and light complexion. However, upon graduation from the University of Texas, he discovered that initially promising interviews with elite law firms led to no follow-up once the potential employers learned that his parents were from Mexico. As a result, he ended up practicing law alongside other Mexican-American lawyers in Houston like John J. Herrera, working to provide counsel to Hispanics up and down the Gulf Coast who could not find equitable representation elsewhere. It was in this capacity that he came face to face with the discrimination Mexican-Americans faced daily in the 1950s.

== Death ==
DeAnda died in Traverse City, Michigan, on September 7, 2006, aged 81.

== See also ==
- List of Hispanic and Latino American jurists
- List of first minority male lawyers and judges in Texas

== Sources ==
- Austin American-Statesman, "Retired judge fought to defend Hispanics civil rights in Texas", 10 September 2006
- Houston Chronicle, "James deAnda" (editorial), 8 September 2006
- Ruiz, Rosanna, Houston Chronicle, "Houston judge had a major role in a landmark ruling on Hispanic rights", 8 September 2006

Legal offices
Preceded by Seat established by 92 Stat. 1629	Judge of the United States District Court for the Southern District of Texas; 1979–1992	Succeeded by Nancy Atlas
Preceded by John Virgil Singleton Jr.	Chief Judge of the United States District Court for the Southern District of Texas; 1988–1992	Succeeded by Norman William Black
