= John Herrera =

John Herrera may refer to:

- John J. Herrera, American attorney, activist, and leader in the Chicano Movement
- John Herrera (gridiron football), American football executive with the NFL's Oakland Raiders
