= George C. Hanks Jr. =

American judge (born 1964)

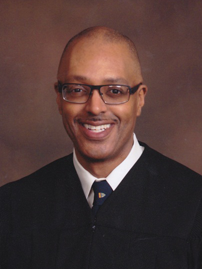

Judge of the United States District Court for the Southern District of Texas
- Incumbent
- Assumed office April 22, 2015
- Appointed by: Barack Obama
- Preceded by: Nancy Atlas

Magistrate Judge of the United States District Court for the Southern District of Texas
- In office September 13, 2010 – April 22, 2015

Personal details
- Born: George Carol Hanks Jr. September 25, 1964 (age 61) Breaux Bridge, Louisiana, U.S.
- Education: Louisiana State University (BA); Harvard University (JD); Duke University (LLM)

George Carol Hanks Jr. (born September 25, 1964) is a United States district judge of the United States District Court for the Southern District of Texas.

== Biography ==
Hanks was born in 1964, in Breaux Bridge, Louisiana. He graduated first in his class from Louisiana State University in 1986, receiving a Bachelor of Arts, summa cum laude. He received a Juris Doctor in 1989 from Harvard Law School. He received a Master of Laws degree in 2014 from Duke University Law School. He began his legal career by serving as a law clerk for Judge Sim Lake of the United States District Court for the Southern District of Texas, from 1989 to 1991. He served as an associate at the law firm of Fulbright & Jaworski, from 1991 to 1996, and as a shareholder at the law firm of Wickliff & Hall, PC, from 1996 to 2000. In 2001, he was appointed by Governor Rick Perry to be a District Judge for the 157th Civil District Court of Texas. He was subsequently elected to the position in 2002. In 2003, he was again appointed by Governor Perry to serve as a justice of the First Court of Appeals of Texas. He was elected to the position in 2004 and reelected in 2006, running as a Republican. From September 13, 2010 to April 22, 2015, he served as a United States magistrate judge of the Southern District of Texas.

=== Federal judicial service ===
On September 18, 2014, President Barack Obama nominated Hanks to serve as a United States district judge of the United States District Court for the Southern District of Texas, to the seat vacated by Judge Nancy Atlas, who assumed senior status on June 20, 2014. His nomination was part of a bipartisan package of nominees which included Rolando Olvera and Alfred H. Bennett His nomination was praised by both Senators John Cornyn and Ted Cruz. On December 16, 2014 his nomination was returned to the President due to the sine die adjournment of the 113th Congress. On January 7, 2015, President Obama renominated him to the same position. He received a hearing before the Judiciary Committee on January 21, 2015. On February 26, 2015 his nomination was reported out of committee by voice vote. On April 20, 2015 the United States Senate confirmed him by a 91–0 vote. He received his judicial commission on April 22, 2015, and was assigned to the Galveston Division of the Southern District of Texas. He is the first African-American federal judge to preside over the Galveston court. Hanks has been mentioned as a possible nominee to the U.S. Court of Appeals for the Fifth Circuit.

== See also ==
- List of African-American federal judges
- List of African-American jurists

Legal offices
| Preceded by Nancy Atlas | Judge of the United States District Court for the Southern District of Texas; 2015–present | Incumbent |
