= Hernandez v. Texas =

- Supreme Court of the United States

Argued January 11, 1954 Decided May 3, 1954
- Full case name: Pete Hernandez v. State of Texas
- Citations: 347 U.S. 475 (more) 74 S. Ct. 667; 98 L. Ed. 866; 1954 U.S. LEXIS 2128

Case history
- Prior: Hernandez v. State, 160 Tex. Crim. 72, 251 S.W.2d 531 (1952); cert.granted, 346 U.S. 811 (1953).

Holding
- Mexican Americans and other nationality groups in the United States have equal protection under the 14th Amendment to the U.S. Constitution.

Court membership
- Chief Justice Earl Warren Associate Justices Hugo Black · Stanley F. Reed; Felix Frankfurter · William O. Douglas; Robert H. Jackson · Harold H. Burton; Tom C. Clark · Sherman Minton

Case opinion
- Majority: Warren, joined by unanimous

Laws applied
- U.S. Const. amend. XIV

Hernandez v. Texas, 347 U.S. 475 (1954), was a United States Supreme Court case, "the first and only Mexican-American civil-rights case heard and decided... during the post-World War II period." In a unanimous ruling, the court held that Mexican Americans and all other nationality groups in the United States have equal protection under the 14th Amendment of the U.S. Constitution. The ruling was written by Chief Justice Earl Warren. This was the first case in which Mexican-American lawyers had appeared before the Supreme Court.

== Background of the case ==
Peter Hernandez, a Mexican-American agricultural worker, was convicted for the 1951 murder of Cayetano "Joe" Espinosa, whom he shot in cold blood at a bar in Edna, Texas. Hernandez's pro bono legal team, including Gustavo C. García, appealed the ruling, arguing that he was being discriminated against because there were no Mexicans in the jury that convicted him. They hoped to challenge what they described as "the systematic exclusion of persons of Mexican origin from all types of jury duty in at least seventy counties in Texas." They argued that Hernandez had the right to be tried by a jury of his peers under the 14th Amendment, but at the time, the 14th Amendment was a special civil rights protection intended for black citizens. The State of Texas denied their claim, on the grounds that Mexicans were white and the 14th Amendment did not protect white nationality groups.

Hernandez's legal team appealed, claiming that Mexican Americans, although white, were treated as a class apart and subject to social discrimination in Jackson County, where the case had been tried, and therefore were deserving of 14th Amendment protection. Their task was then to prove that Mexicans were being discriminated against and that they had been excluded from the grand jury and jury. The State of Texas never officially barred Mexicans from jury service, but Hernandez's defense lawyers demonstrated that, although numerous Mexican Americans were citizens and had otherwise qualified for jury duty in Jackson County, during the previous 25 years no Mexican Americans (or, more precisely, no one with a Hispanic surname) were among the 6,000 persons chosen to serve on juries. This resulted in Hernandez having been deprived of equal protection of the law under the Fourteenth Amendment, as juries were restricted by ethnicity.

They appealed to the United States Supreme Court through a writ of certiorari. The legal team included García, Carlos Cadena and John J. Herrera of the League of United Latin American Citizens, and James DeAnda and Cris Alderete of the G. I. Forum, both activist groups for civil rights for Mexican Americans. These were the first Mexican-American lawyers to represent a defendant before the US Supreme Court, which heard their arguments on January 11, 1954.

== Ruling ==
Chief Justice Earl Warren and the rest of the Supreme Court unanimously ruled in favor of Hernandez, and required he be retried by a jury composed without discrimination against Mexican Americans. Hernandez received a new trial with a jury that included Mexican Americans and was subsequently found guilty of murder once again.

The court omitted the focus of race by declaring that other factors influence whether or not a group may need constitutional protection. To determine if discriminatory factors were present in Jackson County, the court investigated the treatment of Mexican Americans. They discovered a county-wide distinction between "white" and "Mexican" persons. At least one restaurant prominently displayed a sign that declared, "No Mexicans Served." Additionally, until a few years earlier, some Mexican American children attended segregated schools and were forced to drop out by fifth or sixth grade. These factors led the Supreme Court to their ultimate ruling that the Fourteenth Amendment protects persons beyond the racial classes of white or black, and extends protection to nationality groups of white race as well.

== Influence ==
The ruling was an extension of protection in the Civil Rights Movement to nationality groups within the country and an acknowledgement that, in certain times and places, groups other than blacks (African Americans) could be discriminated against. The ultimate effect of this ruling was that the protection of the 14th Amendment was ruled to cover any national or ethnic groups of the United States for which discrimination could be proved.

The oral arguments of this case have been lost. However, the United States Supreme Court docket sheet and letter from Justice Clark to Chief Justice regarding joining opinion are available online.

== See also ==
- List of United States Supreme Court cases, volume 347
- Jury trial
