= List of mayors of Hutchinson, Kansas =

Hutchinson, Kansas mayors

The following is a list of mayors of the city of Hutchinson, Kansas, United States of America.

== List of mayors ==
- Samuel H. Sidlinger
- John P. Harsha, c.1897, 1903-1906
- Frank L. Martin, c.1902-1903
- E. A. Williams
- Frank Vincent, c.1911
- Fred W. Cook, c.1914-1915
- George Gano, 1921-1922
- Walter F. Jones, c.1924
- A. Lewis Oswald, c.1931
- William C. Shaw Jr., c.1952
- J. W. Vandaveer, c.1953
- Charles N. Brown, c.1954
- Robert G. King, c.1955
- John B. Olson, c.1956
- Larry Knipe, c.1973
- Frances Garcia, c.1985-1986, 1989–1990
- Jeffrey A. Roberts, c.2000
- Patrick McCreary
- Robert ‘Bob’ Bernard Bush, 2009, 2013
- Ron Sellers, c.2011
- Jade Piros de Carvalho, c.2022-2023
- Jon Richardson, c.2023-2024
- Greg Fast
- Stacy Goss c. 2025-26
- Scott Meggers

== See also ==
- Hutchinson history
