= Carlos Cadena =

American judge

- Born: 1917
- Died: 2001 (aged 83–84)
- Occupation: Lawyer

Carlos C. Cadena (1917–2001) was an American lawyer, civil rights activist and judge based in San Antonio, Texas.

== Early life and education ==
Carlos Cristian Cadena, who was the son of Mexican immigrants, was born in San Antonio, Texas, in 1917 and attended Catholic school. He earned his LL.B. degree from the University of Texas Law School in 1940, serving as editor of the Texas Law Review and graduating summa cum laude.

== Career ==
Cadena's long legal career was interrupted only by a term as a radio operator in the US Army Air Forces during World War II. In his early years he worked as assistant city attorney (and later city attorney) for San Antonio, was partner in a law firm, and also taught constitutional law at St. Mary's University in San Antonio. Cadena, a father of one, married Gloria Villa Galvan, a young war widow with eight children. Together they raised their nine children.

Cadena worked with fellow attorney Gus Garcia in the landmark case Hernández v. Texas (1954), arguing before the US Supreme Court for the end of a practice of systematic exclusion of Hispanics from jury service in Jackson County, Texas. Even though Mexican-Americans composed more than 10% of the county's population, no person of Mexican ancestry had served on a jury there in over 25 years. The high court, led by Chief Justice Earl Warren, ruled that United States citizens could not be excluded from jury duty based on national origin, because such exclusion denied the accused a jury of his peers. Cadena and Garcia were the first Mexican Americans to argue and win a case in front of the Supreme Court.

Cadena returned to the law faculty, teaching constitutional law at St. Mary's from 1961 until 1965, when Texas governor John Connolly appointed him an associate justice of the 4th Court of Appeals, the first Mexican American to hold such a high ranking judgeship. He was named the Court's chief justice in 1977 by then-governor Dolph Briscoe and held that position until his retirement in 1990 after 25 years on the bench. He continued to serve part-time as a senior appellate justice, as well as acting of counsel to the San Antonio law firm of Charles A. Nicholson, until his death from lung cancer in 2001. Cadena was survived by his wife and nine children.

Cadena received many state and national awards during his more than fifty years of legal practice. The premiere student society of St. Mary's Law School is the Carlos Cadena Law Student Dining Society, and one of the University of Texas Law School's societies is named in his honor. In February 2009, the Public Broadcasting System showed a program A Class Apart, centering on the Hernandez case and its social implications for Mexican Americans.
