= Nancy Atlas =

American judge (born 1949)

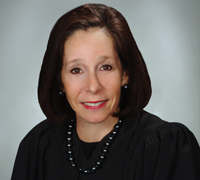

Senior Judge of the United States District Court for the Southern District of Texas
- In office June 20, 2014 – July 31, 2022

Judge of the United States District Court for the Southern District of Texas
- In office June 30, 1995 – June 20, 2014
- Appointed by: Bill Clinton
- Preceded by: James DeAnda
- Succeeded by: George C. Hanks Jr.

Personal details
- Born: Nancy Ellen Friedman; May 20, 1949 (age 76) New York City, New York, U.S.
- Education: Tufts University (BS); New York University (JD)

Nancy Ellen Friedman Atlas (born May 20, 1949) is a former United States district judge of the United States District Court for the Southern District of Texas.

== Early life and education ==
Born in New York City, Atlas received a Bachelor of Science degree from Tufts University in 1971 and a Juris Doctor from New York University School of Law in 1974. She was a law clerk to Judge Dudley Baldwin Bonsal of the United States District Court for the Southern District of New York from 1974 to 1976.

== Career ==
After working in private practice in New York City from 1976 to 1978 as an associate at the law firm Webster & Sheffield, Atlas was an Assistant United States Attorney for the Southern District of New York from 1979 to 1982. She was thereafter in private practice in Houston, Texas, until 1995.

== Federal judicial service ==
On April 4, 1995, Atlas was nominated by President Bill Clinton to a seat on the United States District Court for the Southern District of Texas vacated by James DeAnda. She was confirmed by the United States Senate on June 30, 1995, and received her commission the same day. She assumed senior status on June 20, 2014. She retired from the court on July 31, 2022.

== See also ==
- List of Jewish American jurists

Legal offices
Preceded by James DeAnda	Judge of the United States District Court for the Southern District of Texas; 1995–2014	Succeeded by George C. Hanks Jr.
