= Frances Garcia =

Politician

Frances Garcia (born June 4, 1938) is a former American politician. She served as mayor of Hutchinson, Kansas, from 1985 to 1986 and again from 1989 to 1990, becoming the first Hispanic woman mayor in the Midwestern United States.

== Background ==
The daughter of Joe G. Calvilo and Micaela Chavez, both Mexican immigrants, she was born Frances Calvillo in Hutchinson and was educated at Hutchinson High School. She received a business certificate from Salt City Business College and an associate bachelor's degree in liberal arts from Hutchinson Community College. In 1960, she married John T. Garcia; the couple had two sons. In 1966, she began work as a credit officer for the Wells Department Store. By 1968, she was working as clerk typist at the Reno County Clerk's office. In 1972, Garcia became a savings consultant and loan secretary. She left this job after encountering back problems. From 1983 to 1990, she was a volunteer outreach worker and interpreter for the Hutchinson Methodist Ministry.

Garcia ran for a seat on Hutchinson city council and won the position of mayor, taking office in April 1985 and serving until April 1986. She served as city commissioner for three more years. She ran unsuccessfully for a seat in the Kansas Senate in 1988. She served another term as Hutchinson mayor from April 1989 to April 1990. She went on to serve as a country commissioner for Reno County.

She was recognized by the League of United Latin American Citizens (LULAC) in 1985 and again at LULAC's women's symposium the following year. In 2010, she received the Hank Lacayo Lifetime Achievement Award from the United States Hispanic Leadership Institute.

== See also ==
- List of mayors of Hutchinson, Kansas
