= The Sugar Babies =

2007 documentary film

The Sugar Babies is a 2007 feature-length documentary film about exploitation in the sugar plantations of the Dominican Republic. The film, narrated by Edwidge Danticat, explores how the descendants of African slaves, are trafficked from Haiti to live and work in inhumane conditions akin to modern day slavery.

== Production ==
The Sugar Babies was shot on location in the Dominican Republic, Haiti, England, and the United States. The 99-minute film is originally in Spanish, French and Creole and sub-titled in English, and produced by the Hope, Courage and Justice Project of New Orleans, the Human Rights Foundation of New York, and the former Siren Studios of Miami.

The film was written, shot, produced, and directed by Amy Serrano. Its executive producer is Claudia Chiesi, its producer is Thor Halvorssen, Constance Haqq is co-producer and Salvador Longoria and Tico Pujals are associate producers. The film was edited by Jason Ocasio and scored by Bill Cruz.

== Release ==
The film officially premiered at the Montreal International Haitian Film Festival, but preview screenings in Paris and Miami led to heated controversy.

The Miami screening of the film, which included many members of the Hispanic media of South Florida and from the Dominican Republic, was the subject of a cease and desist order one hour before the time of screening, as well as a bribery scandal when several radio producers came forward to state that Dominican diplomats had offered them bribes to disrupt the screening and give the film a bad review. The Paris screening of the film was also the subject of a sabotage attempt.

The film was an "Official Selection" at Unifem's Through Women's Eyes Film Festival, the New Orleans International Human Rights Film Festival, and the Buffalo Niagara Film Festival. It was also an "Official Selection" at both the Miami International Film Festival and the Women's International Film Festival, but was withdrawn from both South Florida festivals, ostensibly due to pressure from the sugar industry.

The Sugar Babies won the Jury Prize for Best Documentary at the Delray Beach Film Festival, was screened in film festivals and educational venues, and toured with Amnesty International in France.
