= Eugene Nelson =

American labor leader

- Born: 1929; Modesto, California, U.S.
- Died: 1999 (aged 69–70); Haleʻiwa, Hawaii, U.S.
- Occupations: Writer; labor leader
- Children: 2

Eugene Nelson (1929–1999) was a radical American writer and labor leader.

He was born in Modesto, California. Growing up on farms, he twice saw his family's home and his garden taken over by bankers. He then lived in towns all over California, where his mother worked as a waitress. At age twelve, Nelson read the Boy Scout manual with its message of kindness to others. That motivated him to think seriously about the desirability of economic and political improvement. He also learned of the need for social change by reading Citizen Tom Paine by Howard Fast, and the poems and essays of Percy Shelley. While in high school, he made friends with Mexican-American and Chinese-American boys who lived in the slums.

Nelson won first place in a Lions Club speaking contest with a speech on world peace, and in the high-school poetry contest with a poem on Thomas Paine. At age sixteen, he read the poems of Walt Whitman and began writing poetry. He decided to spend his life as a wandering poet, but discovered that it is too cold in the U.S. much of the year to be able to sleep outdoors.

After high school, Nelson worked for a while with Mexican immigrants thinning sugar beets near Stockton, California with a short-handled hoe. It was hard low-paid work, and made him sharply aware of the falsity of the myth that Mexicans are lazy. "They were the warmest, friendliest and highest-spirited people I have ever known," he observed, "and fueled my interest in things Mexican." Later he worked at forty or fifty different jobs, trying to get different and new perspectives on the world. He learned to speak Spanish fluently.

Eugene married a Mexican-American nurse, who gave birth to two daughters. "We planned to raise an international family," he wrote wistfully, "to show that different peoples can live together in harmony. Alas, we didn't have sufficient dedication or wherewithal to carry through on this... We had a successful marriage for several years, partly because we each made the decisions on alternate days."

In 1966 Nelson became Texas director of the first grape boycott by César Chávez's farmworker union. Later, in south Texas, he founded a union called the Independent Workers Association, which later affiliated with Chávez's United Farm Workers. A long strike and march to Austin resulted in improved pay and conditions for workers in south Texas. The police arrested Eugene on various spurious charges, including inciting a riot and threatening the lives of Texas Rangers. As a roving farmworkers' advocate and organizer, he also joined the Industrial Workers of the World (Wobblies).

In his later years, Nelson continued to write and research on topics of social and political controversy. "I think the chief priorities today," he wrote in 1993, "are preventing nuclear explosions; feeding the starving; lessening pollution and the exhaustion of the earth's resources; achieving a much lower birth rate; homes for all; and cooperative and participatory democracy (with compassion) in all aspects of life."

In 1999, Eugene Nelson died of a massive stroke in his retirement home in Haleiwa, Hawaii.

== Works ==
- Huelga! The First One Hundred Days of the Delano Grape Strike
- Bracero - novel, Culver City, Calif. : Peace Press Pub., 1975
- Pablo Cruz and the American Dream, 1975
- Poems, Sane and Insane, 1992
- Fantasia of a Revolutionary
- Tales of Crapitalism
- Break Their Haughty Power: Joe Murphy in the Heyday of the Wobblies, biographical novel. San Francisco: ism press, 1993
