= Maria Vizcarrondo-De Soto =

- Born: 1951 (age 74–75); New York City
- Education: Kean University
- Occupations: President and CEO of the United Way of Essex and West Hudson.

Notes
- She was instrumental in the creation of chapters of "ASPIRA" in different parts of New Jersey.

Maria Vizcarrondo-De Soto (born c. 1951) is the first woman and Latina to become the president and CEO of the United Way of Essex and West Hudson.

== Early years ==
Vizcarrondo-De Soto's family moved from Puerto Rico to New York City in the 1940s in search of better jobs. She received her primary education in the "Barrio" before her family moved to Newark, New Jersey. There she received her secondary education and graduated from high school with honors.

Vizcarrondo-De Soto earned her bachelor's degree from Kean University and went on to earn her master's degree in Public Policy and Administration at Columbia University. She continued her education by attending the Harvard Kennedy School, where she received executive training. She then attended the Business School at Harvard University.

In 1989, Vizcarrondo-De Soto was an alumna at the National Hispana Leadership Institute. She later became a fellow in the National Hispana Leadership Program and also in the International YMCA Leadership in Geneva, Switzerland.

== ASPIRA ==
In 1980, Vizcarrondo-De Soto became the executive Director of ASPIRA, Inc of New Jersey. She was instrumental in the creation of chapters in different parts of New Jersey serving over 10,000 Latino youth. In 1990 she founded and directed until 1993 the Center for Hispanic, Research and Development at the New Jersey Department of Community Affairs in Trenton, New Jersey. On November 4, 1993, Vizcarrondo-De Soto was elected to the Board of the New Jersey Council of Grant Makers, thus becoming the first Hispanic to be elected to a countywide post in the history of the Essex County Government.

== United Way of Essex and West Hudson ==
Vizcarrondo-De Soto renounced from her position in ASPIRA and joined United Way. On April 1, 1996, she became the first woman to be named president and CEO of the United Way of Essex and West Hudson. As president she established two programs which have received national recognition, "Project Leadership" and "Success".

== Honors and recognition ==
Some of the honors and recognitions which she has received are:

- 1999 - Featured on the October issue of Hispanic Magazine.
- 2000 - Named one of the most influential persons in New Jersey.
- 2003 - One of three people to be honored with the Maria DeCastro Blake Community Service Award by the New Jersey Hispanic and Research Center.
- 2005 - Recipient of the Newark Now Spirit of Newark Awards - The Broker Award.
- 2005 - Honored by El Diario/La Prensa as one of the most distinguished Latinas in 2005.

== Later years ==
Vizcarrondo-De Soto is also an active member of various organizations. She serves on the Board of Trustees of Bloomfield College where she is chair of the Academic Affairs Committee. She is also involved in the following: member of the Education Committee of the New Jersey Performing Arts Center, board member of the New Newark Police Foundation, New Jersey's Institute for Social Justice and chair in the Essex County Human Service Advisory Council.

Vizcarrondo-De Soto is pursuing her postgraduate work in the area of public policy and during her free time enjoys diving, golfing and cooking Puerto Rican meals.

== See also ==
- List of Puerto Ricans
