= Amy Serrano =

American author and film director

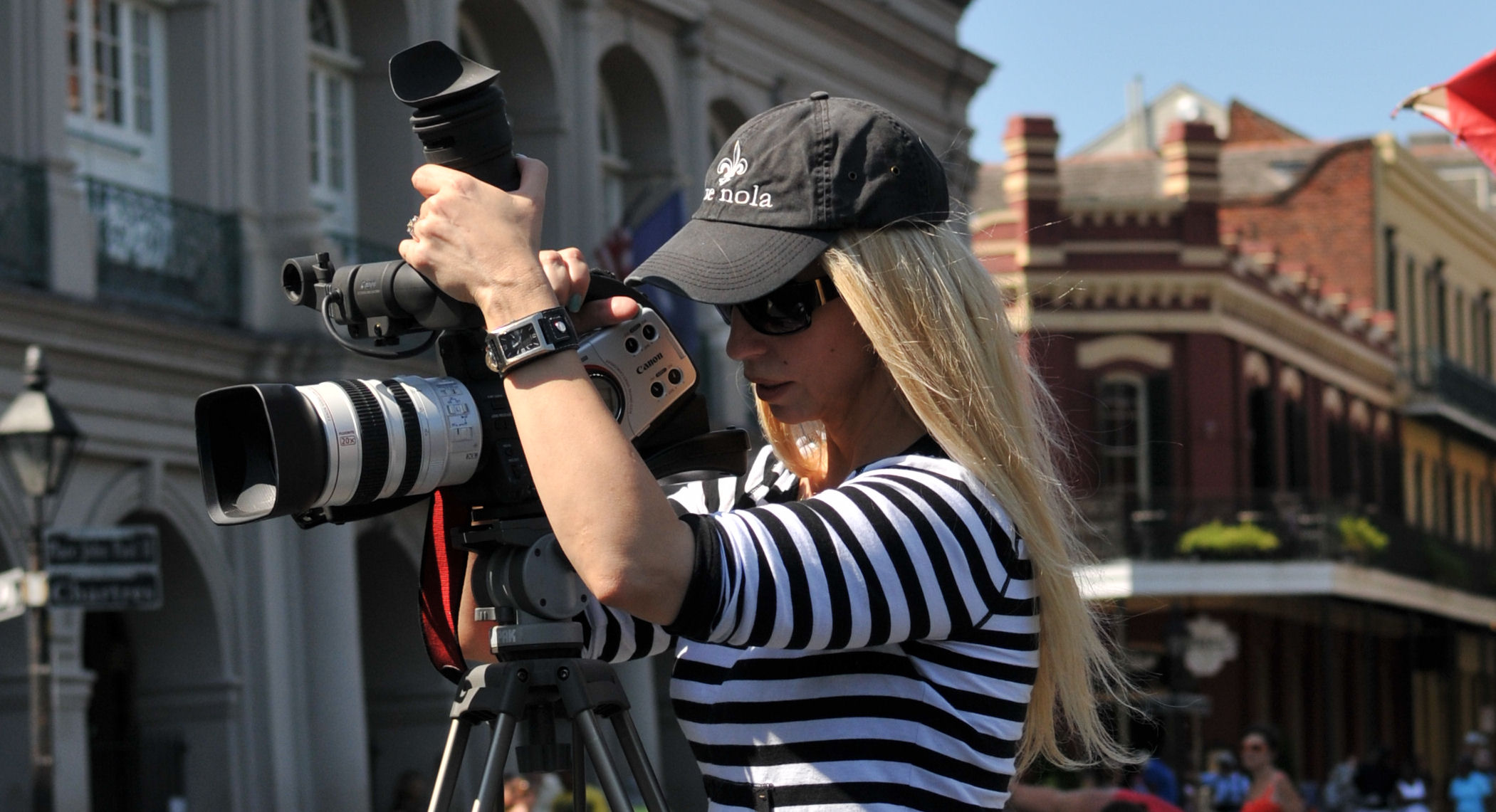
- Amy Serrano, New Orleans, 2012
- Born: November 8, 1966 (age 59); Havana, Cuba
- Citizenship: United States
- Education: Bachelor of Arts, Sociology and Anthropology
- Occupations: Author, filmmaker, human rights activist
- Known for: Documentaries, Books, Human Rights

Amy Serrano (born November 8, 1966) is an American filmmaker, author and human rights activist. She is most well known for her documentary, The Sugar Babies: The Plight of the Children of Agricultural Workers on the Sugar Industry of the Dominican Republic.

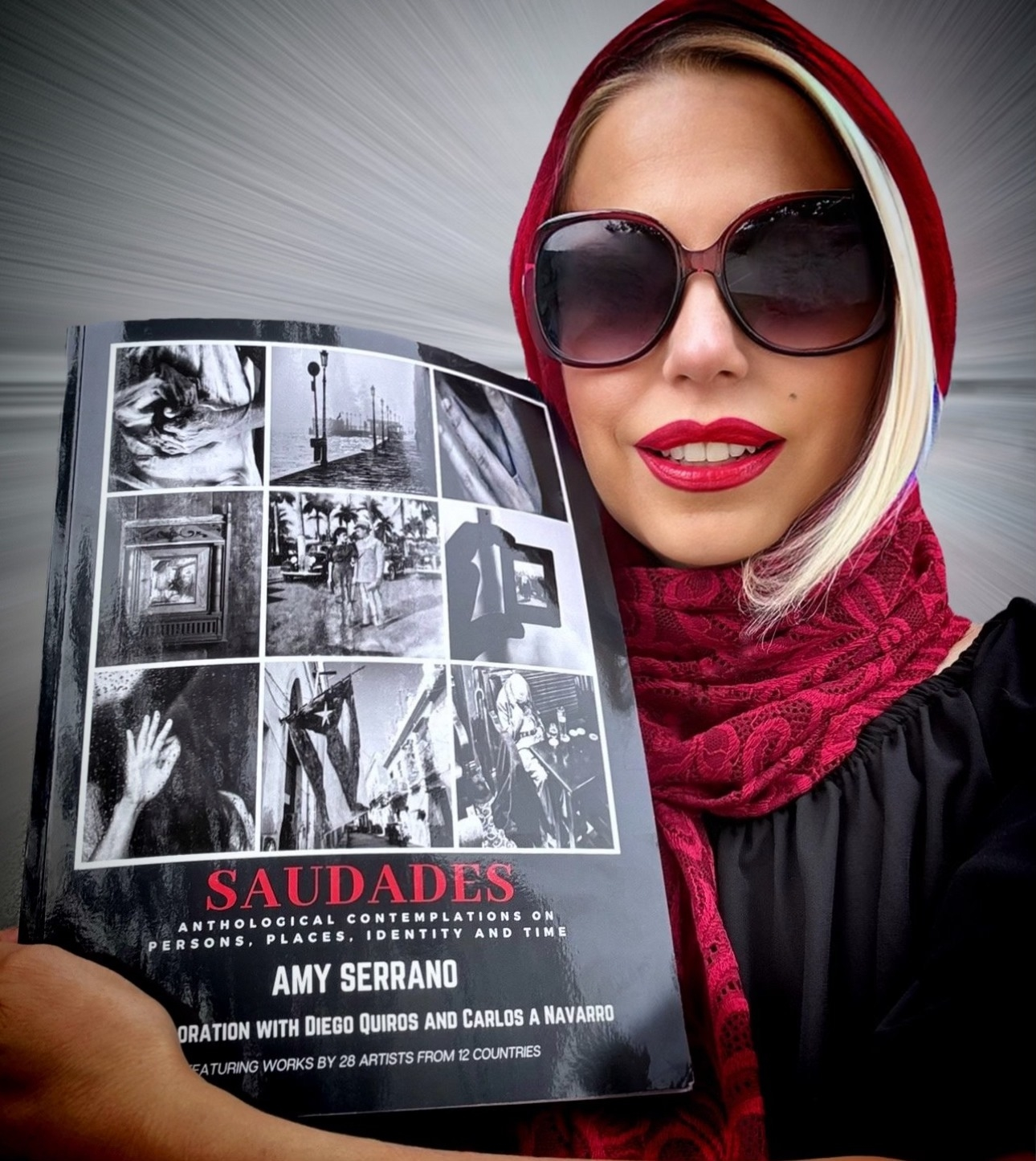

== Early life and education ==
Serrano was born in a post-revolutionary Cuba, and after having to separate from her family and homeland just before the age of 2, Serrano was relocated to Miami as a political refugee.

Serrano attended Florida International University and graduated with a degree in Sociology and Anthropology with a focus on Latin-American and Caribbean Studies, Race and Ethnicity.

In 2007, Serrano relocated from her hometown of Miami, Florida to New Orleans, Louisiana to work on her writing.

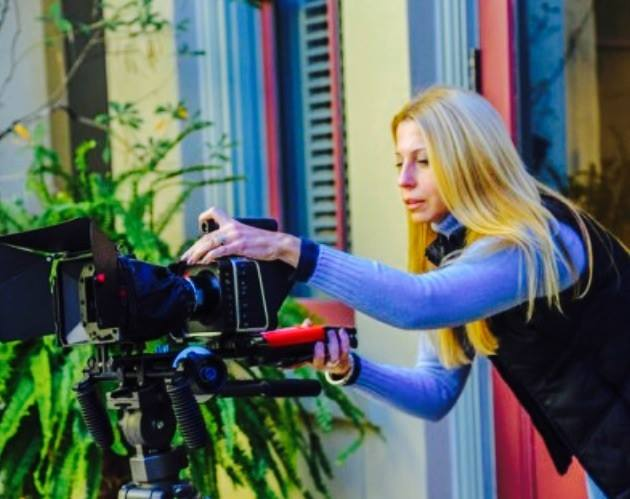
Amy Serrano, Documentary Film Director

== Filmmaking ==
Serrano's first work was as a producer for the PBS documentary Adios Patria? The Cuban Exodus. The film recalls the stories of Cubans fleeing their homeland, unfolding onto the shores of South Florida. It features interviews, from liberals to the conservative. The film is narrated by Academy Award nominee Andy Garcia.

Serrano executive produced the PBS broadcast Cafe con Leche: Voices of Exiles' Children. The film is an introspective look at the first wave of Cuban exiles who came to the United States, who are now young adults.

Serrano directed and produced the PBS broadcast A Woman's Place: Voices of Contemporary Hispanic-American Women featuring Hispanic-American Women.

Serrano wrote, produced and directed the U.S. co-production for the feature-length film Move! Produced in Rome, Italy and distributed through film festivals and television in Europe, Move! is composed of short films by 11 filmmakers exploring the dispassionate state of humanity through varied emotions.

Serrano went up against Big Sugar to investigate child labor and human trafficking when she filmed, produced, wrote and directed the feature-length documentary The Sugar Babies: The Plight of the Children of Agricultural Workers on the Sugar Industry of the Dominican Republic. Narrated by Haitian-American author Edwidge Danticat and composed of field recordings coupled with outside testimony, the film explores the lives of the descendants of the first Africans delivered to the island of Hispaniola for the bittersweet commodity that once ruled the world." The film's release resulted in multiple death threats against Serrano and persecution by Big Sugar and the Government of the Dominican Republic.

Serrano's body of work includes directing and producing the short film Of Hope, Courage and Justice: A Global Mosaic of Women in Human Rights, and associate producing the Emmy-Award nominated Havana: Portrait of Yesteryear, narrated by Gloria Estefan, for PBS.

== Other work ==
In 2009, Serrano was commissioned by the Louisiana Division of the Arts to produce a photographic essay on a new population. After spending considerable time with the Garifuna people, Serrano wrote and produced From Punta to Chumba: Garifuna Music and Dance in New Orleans, which explores the role of females in the Garifuna community as cultural tradition bearers. From Punta to Chumba was first published by Louisiana's Living Traditions.

In late 2013, Serrano released her first book of poems, Of Fiery Places and Sacred Spaces, which deals with the poetics of place and space. Her poems have been published in Latino Stuff Review, Ella Magazine, MiPo Gallery, Into the Woods, The Peauxdunque Writers' Alliance Annual Anthology, and Poets and Artists Magazine.

In 2016, she was invited to write the foreword to photographer Diego Quiros' fine art photography book, Alchimie Photographique. In 2017, she edited the Into the Woods Anthology and wrote the foreword.

In 2024, the book, Saudades:Anthological Contemplations of Persons, Places, Identity and Time. was published. Through poetry, short stories, song lyrics, art, and fine art photography, 28 artists from 12 countries join Amy to undertake the exploration of the beautiful complexity of this word that may be for an ardent desire, a deep seated longing, a bittersweet nostalgia, a haunting melancholy, a mysterious incompleteness, a desperate yearning, a poignant sadness, an elusive wish, an irreplaceable loss, a pervasive sense of missingness, and other nuances unraveled in the book. Though the word saudade is untranslatable into English, the experience of this emotion is universal.

Saudades delves into the different forms of the emotion of saudade as it pertains to persons, places, identity and time.

Serrano has been a Senior Fellow of the Human Rights Foundation in New York; a Fellow of the National Hispana Leadership Institute in Washington D.C.; a board member of Voz de Mujer, a women’s empowerment and leadership organization based in Texas; an Advisory Council member of the Faulkner Society’ in New Orleans; a member of the Spanish Embassy's Young Hispanic Leader’s Association in Washington D.C.; and an appointed founding Board member of Ambassador Armando Valladares' non-governmental organization, Human Rights for All.

Presently, Serrano is at work on the film, AIRMAN: The Extraordinary Life of Calvin G. Moret [USA], on the inspiring life and legacy of New Orleans’ last known Tuskegee Airman, this is the story of one man’s love of country and humanity, even during unconscionable times. She is also writing the book, "Mr. Moret and I: The Story and Legacy of My Unexpected Friendship with Louisiana's Last Tuskegee Airman." Both are targeted for release in the Fall of 2026.

== Awards and recognition ==
Serrano's leadership has been honored by the City of Miami with a proclamation making October 27 "Amy Serrano Day".

Serrano was one of eight women selected and profiled in "Evolution of Woman", a women's empowerment installation commissioned by Clinique Cosmetics. This national exhibit involved women selected by Clinique Cosmetics and photographed by Sandi Fellman, and was first unveiled at New York City's Metropolitan Pavilion before traveling the country with Clinique.

Serrano has been featured in Glamour Magazine [Spanish Edition] three times including Woman of the Year.

Serrano is a recipient of the Tesoro Award in Art and Culture. She was awarded a Fellowship with the National Hispana Leadership Institute. Serrano was selected and profiled in a book on Hispanic-American leaders in the United States published by the Spain-U.S. Council.

Serrano has been profiled in the Florida Hispanic Yearbook, and MEGA TV named her "one of the most influential and recognized Hispanics in the United States." She was photographed and written about as a "Mujer Vanidades" in Vanidades Magazine.
