= Jo-Ann Burdian =

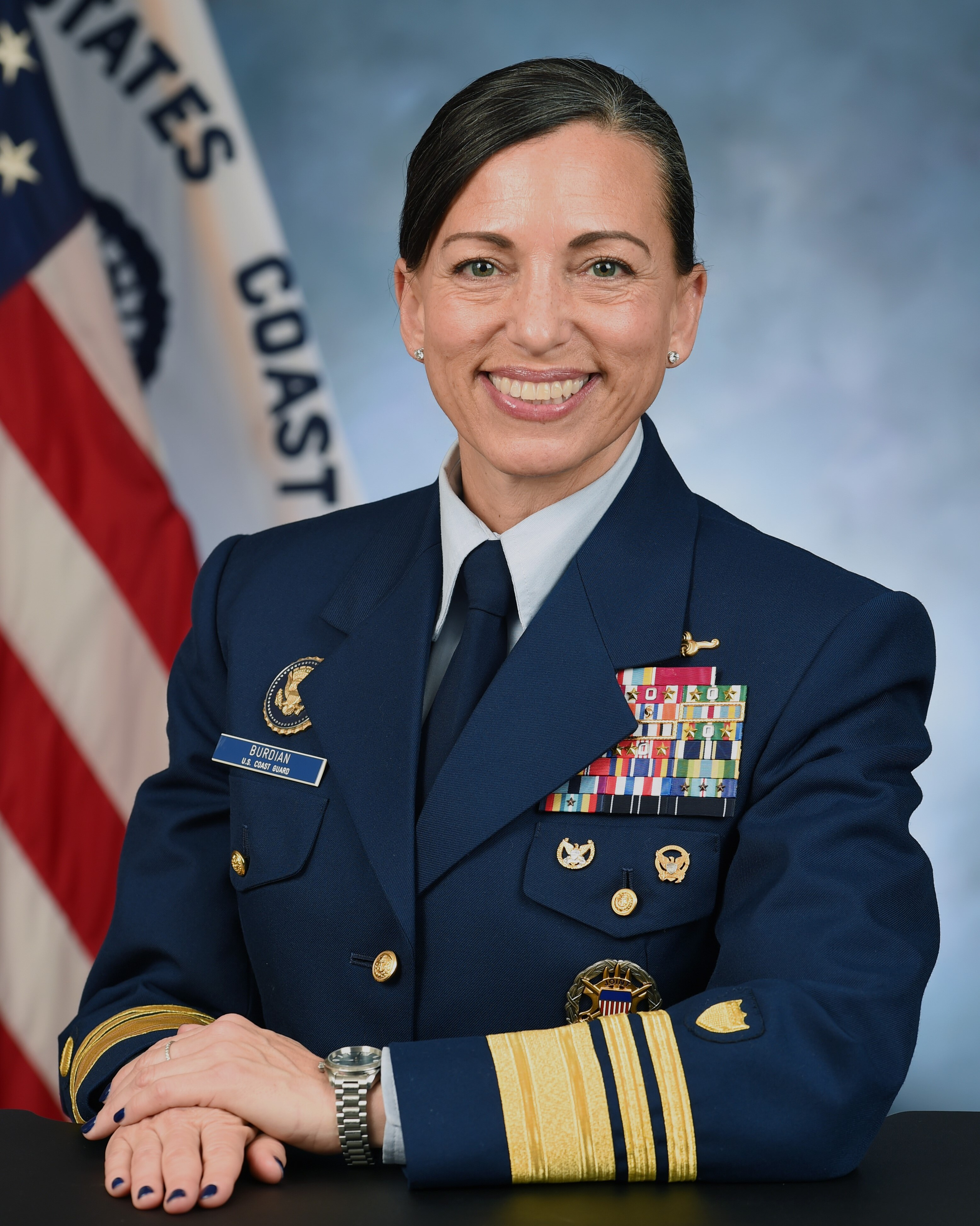
- Education: U.S. Coast Guard Academy 1997; Florida State University M.A. 2013
- Spouse: Captain Stephen Burdian (Ret.)
- Children: 3
- Military career
- Branch: United States Coast Guard
- Service years: 1997-present
- Rank: Vice Admiral

Jo-Ann Feigofsky Burdian is a United States Coast Guard admiral who was the first female Hispanic American flag officer in the USCG.

== Early life ==
Born in Queens, New York.

== Military career ==
Vice Admiral Burdian is the Commander, Atlantic Area of the U.S. Coast Guard (2026). She was previously the Senior Advisor to the Commandant; Director, Joint Interagency Task Force South (2024), in Key West, Florida; and Assistant Commandant for Response Policy (2022).

As a junior officer, she was the First Lieutenant of the USCGC Courageous. As a lieutenant she was the USCG liaison to the U.S. House of Representative. She was the commander of the USCGC Key Biscayne and the executive officer of the USCGC Attu.

Burdian is a 1997 graduate of the U.S. Coast Guard Academy and a 2013 graduate of Florida State University where she earned a master's of public administration.

== Military awards and decorations ==
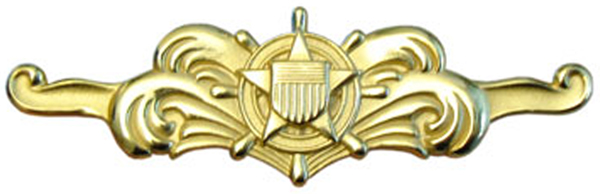
Cutterman Insignia - Officer
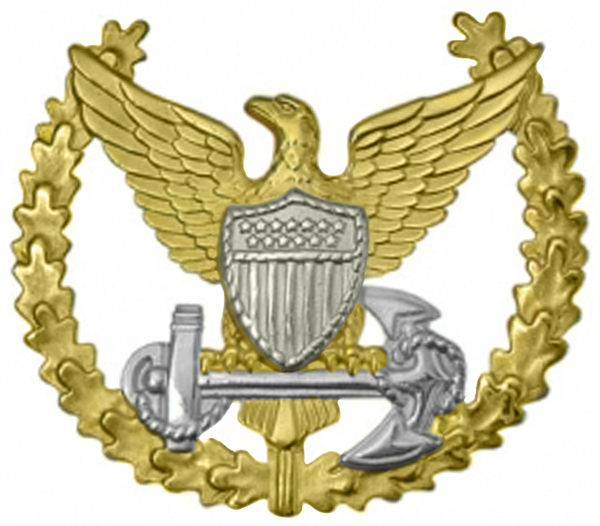
Command Ashore Pin
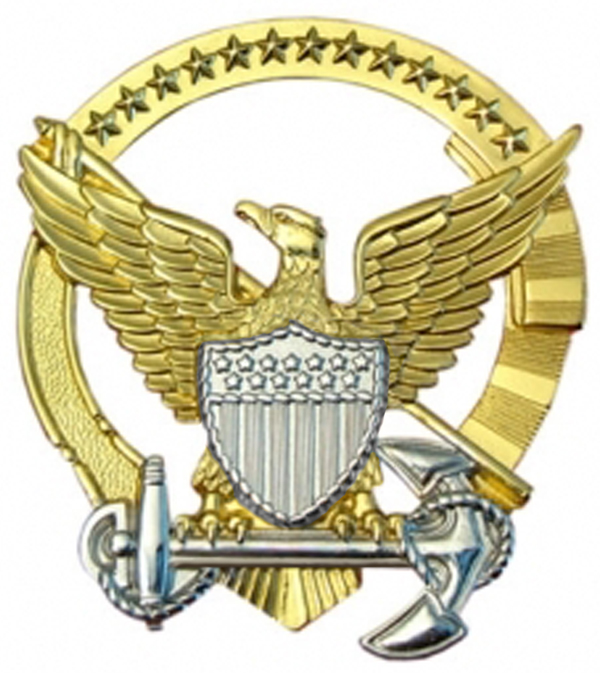
Command Afloat Pin

Office of the Joint Chiefs of Staff Identification Badge

Presidential Service Badge

Defense Superior Service Medal
Legion of Merit
Meritorious Service Medal with two service stars and an operational device
Coast Guard Commendation Medal with two service stars and an operational device
Presidential Unit Citation (Coast Guard) with hurricane device
Joint Meritorious Unit Award
DHS Outstanding Unit Award
Coast Guard Unit Commendation with two service stars and an operational device
Coast Guard Meritorious Unit Commendation
Coast Guard Meritorious Team Commendation with three service stars and an operational device
Coast Guard "E" Ribbon
National Defense Service Medal
Global War on Terrorism Service Medal
Armed Forces Service Medal
Humanitarian Service Medal
Transportation 9–11 Ribbon
Coast Guard Special Operations Service Ribbon with three service stars
Coast Guard Sea Service Ribbon with one service star
Coast Guard Rifle Marksmanship Ribbon
Coast Guard Pistol Marksmanship Ribbon

== Awards ==
LatinaStyle Trailblazer Award (2024)

== Personal life ==
Burdian is married to Capt. Stephen Burdian, USCG (Ret.) has three sons Jack, Sean, and James.
