= Norma García =

American politician

Norma G. García (born October 5, 1950) is an American politician of Hispanic descent. She was mayor of Mercedes, Texas from 1986 to 1993.

The daughter of Zacarias H. Garza and Olivia Cavazos, she was born Norma Linda Garza in Donna, Texas, attended high school there and studied stenography at a San Antonio community college. She worked as an interviewer for the Texas Employment Commission in Donna and, then moved to Mercedes in 1978 after she married Jorge Antonio García. The couple had three children. She took a real estate course at Texas Southmost College in Brownsville, earning her real estate sales agent license in 1984.

García ran unsuccessfully for a seat on Mercedes city council in 1984. In 1986, she became a legislative assistant for Juan Hinojosa. She was named chair of the Hidalgo County Urban County Association. Also in 1986, she was elected mayor for Mercedes, the first woman to serve in that post, and went on to serve three terms, the maximum permitted by the city's charter. She was elected treasurer for Hidalgo County in 1994 and was reelected five times, most recently in 2015.

In 1992, she was named Mayor of the Year by the Association of Hispanic Municipal Officials; García was a founding member of that organization. She has served on the board of directors of the Lower Rio Grande Valley Development Council and served four terms as the Council's president. She was named Outstanding County Treasurer of Texas in 2007.
