= Nicki Gonzales =

Educator and first Latina Colorado State Historian

- Born: Denver, Colorado
- Education: Yale University, University of Colorado Boulder
- Occupations: Educator and historian
- Children: Danny and Teddy

Nicki Gonzales is an educator and historian and currently serves as the Colorado State Historian. She is the vice provost and a tenured professor of history at Regis University. When Dr. Gonzales was appointed in 2021-2022 to serve as the Colorado State Historian, she was the first Latino ever named to the position. She made history again when she was appointed to a second term in 2026, remaining the only Latino to have ever served in the role.

== Biography ==
Dr. Nicki Gonzales was born and raised in Denver. Her family comes from southern Colorado and northern New Mexico. Her family was part of the coal mining and agricultural communities in southern Colorado, until her grandparents moved to Denver for economic opportunity during World War II. Her grandfather was an active union member in the meat packing industry. She identifies as Mexican-American and Chicana.

Gonzales graduated from Yale University with a BA in English literature in 1992. While at Yale, she was a member of the cycling team, volunteered at Dwight Hall, and ran one of the college's film societies. She placed 2nd in the Eastern Conference Cycling Road Race category in 1991. She earned her PhD in American History from University of Colorado Boulder in 1997. While at CU Boulder, she was one of the researchers who built the case for the Sangre de Cristo Land Grant lawsuits. Additionally, she developed a research interest in Mexican-American and Chicano Vietnam War veterans, partly because her father was a Marine during the war.

She is a member of the State Historian's Council. She served as an advisor for several History Colorado exhibits, including El Movimiento: The Chicano Movement in Colorado and Zoom In: The Centennial State in 100 Objects. She was appointed in 2020 by Governor Jared Polis as vice chair of the Colorado Geographic Naming Advisory Board. She also served on Mayor Michael Hancock's advisory panel for renaming public landmarks.

In 2021, she was named Colorado State Historian by the State Historian's Council. One of her goals was to create "a more inclusive, broader history of our state.". She was the first and only Latino to serve in the role. She was named again as the Colorado State Historian in 2026.. During her second term, she is focused "on lessons learned from the history of Coloradans building successful coalitions. She is currently working on a book tracing the history of the Land Rights Movement in Colorado’s southwestern town of San Luis – a movement that highlights the power of coalitions in the pursuit of justice."

Gonzales was a major contributor to Denver's first Latino/Chicano Historic Context study. Dr. Gonzales played a critical role in helping Regis obtain its designation as a Hispanic Serving Institute in 2023, making it the only private university in Colorado and only the second Jesuit Catholic university in the United States to earn the HSI designation.

Her research expertise is in Chicano history and Southwest social and political movements, including the experiences of Chicano/Latino Vietnam veterans.. She is a board member for the Museum of Denver currently in development, and has also played a key role in Denver’s restoration plans for La Alma-Lincoln Park.

=== Personal life ===
Gonzales has two sons, Danny and Teddy.

== Published works ==
- Gonzales, Nicki. “‘Yo Soy Loco Por Esa Sierra’: The History of Land Rights Activism in San Luis Colorado, 1863-2002.” Ph.D. dissertation, University of Colorado at Boulder, 2007.

== Recognition ==
- 2021, Trailblazer Award from Latinas First Foundation
