= Linda Pauwels =

Argentinian-American pilot

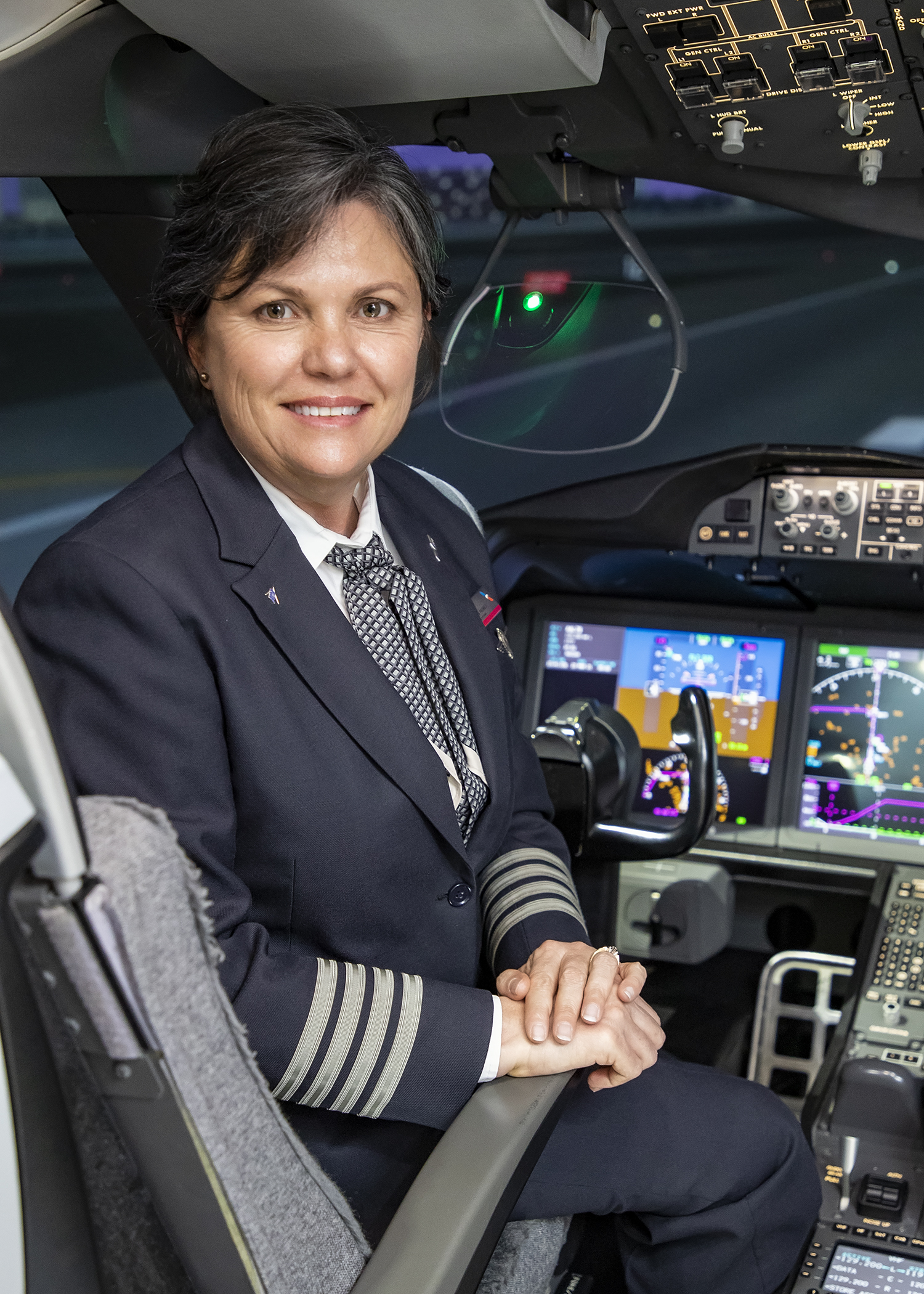
- Born: 1963 (age 62–63); San Pedro, Buenos Aires, Argentina
- Known for: First Latina Captain and First Latina Check Airman at American Airlines

Linda Pauwels (born 1963) is the first Latina Captain at American Airlines. She was also the youngest female jet captain (cargo) at age 25 on a Boeing 707, in 1988.

== Life ==
Pauwels was born Linda Pfeiffer in San Pedro, Buenos Aires. Her grandfather is Polish General Franciszek “Radwan” Pfeiffer, commander of longest fighting unit during Warsaw Uprising. She has been married to Frederick Pauwels, a fellow airline pilot, since 1981. They have two children. She graduated from Miami Dade College’s North Campus at age 22 in 1985 and was inducted into the MDC Hall of Fame in 2005.

== Career ==
She has been with American Airlines since 1988. She has served as Check Airman and designated examiner on behalf of FAA (instructor/evaluator) on A-320 aircraft, and presently on B-787 passenger jets. In 2000, she became American Airlines' first Hispanic woman captain on a McDonnell Douglas MD-80 and, in 2015, the company's first Hispanic woman to be a Check Airman.

Before American Airlines, she was a pilot for Southern Air Transport. They were a military and civilian contractor, known for having been owned by the CIA before Congress required them to divest ownership.

She was a columnist for the Orange County Register and has published two books, Beyond Haiku: Pilots Write Poetry, and Beyond Haiku: Women Pilots Write Poetry, which features never-before published poems by Amelia Earhart.

In celebration of International Women’s Day of 2021, American Airlines operated a flight with an all-female crew both on the plane and the ground from Miami to Dallas-Fort Worth. Linda Pauwels led the flight crew.

== Awards and Recognition ==
- 2002 - Recognized on the floor of the U.S. House of Representatives by Representative Loretta Sanchez for her achievements in aviation and her role as a pioneering female pilot.
