= Gustavo C. Garcia =

American civil rights attorney

Gustavo "Gus" C. Garcia (July 27, 1915 – June 3, 1964) was an American civil rights attorney. Garcia worked with fellow attorney Carlos Cadena in the landmark case Hernández v. Texas (1954), arguing before the US Supreme Court for the end of a practice of systematic exclusion of Hispanics from jury service in Jackson County, Texas. Even though Mexican Americans composed more than 10% of the county's population, no person of Mexican ancestry had served on a jury there and in 70 other Texas counties in over 25 years. The high court, led by Chief Justice Earl Warren, ruled that United States citizens could not be excluded from jury duty based on national origin, because such exclusion denied the accused a jury of his peers.

== Early life ==
Garcia was born in Laredo, Texas, to Alfredo and Maria Teresa (Arguindegui) Garcia and was raised in San Antonio. He attended public and Catholic schools, and was the first valedictorian of Thomas Jefferson High School, when he graduated in 1932. He received a scholarship to study at the University of Texas, where he earned a B.A. in 1936 and a LL.B. in 1938.

== Career ==
He was admitted to the Texas Bar in 1938, and worked as an assistant for the district attorney of Bexar County, Texas, John Schook, in 1938, and city attorney Victor Keller in 1941. In 1941 he was drafted into the United States Army. He became a first lieutenant in the United States Army, and was stationed in Japan with the judge advocate corps. Garcia participated in the founding of the UN in San Francisco in 1945. On February 1, 1947, he joined the office of the Mexican Consulate General in San Antonio, Texas. In April 1947, Garcia filed suit against Cuero, Texas school authorities to force closure of the segregated schools for Mexicans there. After the Mendez v. Westminster ISD case ended de jure segregation of Mexican-descent children in California, Garcia filed a similar suit in Texas, aided by R. C. Eckhardt of Austin and A. L. Wirin of the American Civil Liberties Union of Southern California. Delgado v. Bastrop ISD (1948) made the segregation of children of Mexican descent in Texas illegal.

Garcia served as legal advisor to the League of United Latin American Citizens from 1939 to 1940. He was elected to the San Antonio Independent School District Board of Education in April 1948, but later resigned. He helped revise the LULAC Constitution to permit non-Mexican Americans to become members in 1949. In that year, he also served as lawyer to the family of Felix Longoria, and helped contract negotiations for the rights of workers in the United States-Mexico Bracero Program. On May 8, 1950, Garcia and George I. Sanchez appeared before the State Board of Education to seek desegregation enforcement. Garcia was legal advisor to the American G.I. Forum from 1951 to 1952. He helped pass an anti-discrimination bill in Texas. Garcia served on the first board of directors of the American Council of Spanish Speaking People, and the Texas Council on Human Relations, and helped the School Improvement League, the League of Loyal Americans, the Mexican Chamber of Commerce, and the Pan American Optimist Club. In 1952, the University of Texas Alba Club named him "Latin of the Year."

Garcia became legal counsel for the League of United Latin American Citizens, and the American GI Forum. He assisted in Hernandez v. Texas (1954), the first case by Mexican Americans to be heard by the U.S. Supreme Court. On January 19, 1953, he and attorney Carlos Cadena of San Antonio filed a writ of certiorari with the United States Supreme Court requesting review of the Hernandez case, because the trial was decided by an all-white jury in Edna, Texas. The legal expenses made it necessary for Carlos Cadena to make appeals on Mexican radio stations asking the community for donations. Due to this appeal, Chico Vasquez and Bill Aken (adopted son of Mexican actress Lupe Mayorga) formed the Mexican rock and roll band 'Los Nomadas' in East Los Angeles, California and played at dances, shows, and concerts to help raise money for the cause. When Garcia appeared before the Supreme Court on January 11, 1954, Chief Justice Earl Warren gave him sixteen extra minutes to present his argument. The Supreme Court ruled that exclusion of eligible jurors due to their ancestry of national origin violated the Equal Protection Clause of the 14th Amendment. Ultimately, Hernandez was found guilty of murdering his employer, who was also Mexican American, in a fit of rage.

In 1955, Garcia stayed in a hospital several times, probably due to alcohol abuse. Invitations to LULAC and G.I. Forum meetings and conventions declined by 1956. Garcia passed several bad checks in 1960 and 1961, leading James Tafolla, Jr., and other San Antonio lawyers to seek his disbarment. His law license was suspended from August 1961 to August 1963.

== Personal life ==
Garcia married three times and had two children with his second wife. After the Hernandez case had been won Garcia began to drink heavily and suffer from mental illness. During this time he was in and out of mental institutions until he eventually died of liver failure at age 48. Garcia was penniless and nearly friendless. He was buried in Fort Sam Houston National Cemetery.

== Legacy ==
In 1964, the League of United Latin American Citizens established the Gus C. Garcia Memorial Fund. A middle school in San Antonio is named after him. In 1983, the Gus Garcia Memorial Foundation was established in San Antonio to sponsor programs and media events to recognize his contribution.
