= John J. Herrera =

LULAC president and Chicano Movement activist

- Herrera in 1973

21st President of the League of United Latin American Citizens
- In office 1952–1953
- Preceded by: George J. Garza
- Succeeded by: Albert Armendariz

Personal details
- Born: April 12, 1910 Vernon Parish, Louisiana, U.S.
- Died: October 12, 1986 (aged 76) Houston, Texas, U.S.
- Party: Democratic
- Spouse: Olivia Cisneros (m. 1943) Carmen Luisa García (m. 1972)
- Children: 7
- Education: South Texas College of Law Houston (LLB)
- Occupation: Attorney, activist

John James Herrera (April 12, 1910 – October 12, 1986) was an American attorney, activist, and leader in the Chicano Movement.

== Early life and education ==
Herrera was born in Cravens, Louisiana, an unincorporated community in Vernon Parish. His great-great-grandfather was José Francisco Ruiz, a politician and soldier. Herrera was raised in Houston and graduated from Sam Houston High School, where Lyndon B. Johnson was one of his teachers. He earned a Bachelor of Laws degree from the South Texas College of Law Houston. While attending law school, Herrera supported himself by working as a laborer and taxi driver.

== Career ==
He joined the League of United Latin American Citizens (LULAC) in 1933 and began practicing law in Houston, Texas in 1943. During World War II, he was involved in the movement to end employment discrimination against Mexican-Americans in Houston shipyards. In 1948 he joined the legal team that brought the school-discrimination case of Minerva Delgado against the Bastrop Independent School District to the Texas Supreme Court. The ruling declared educational segregation of Mexican American students illegal in Texas. In 1954, he authored the briefs for the case of Hernandez v. Texas that argued that the exclusion of Mexican American jurors was unconstitutional. The case reached the Supreme Court of the United States, which decided in Hernandez's favor.

Herrera was also a lifelong member of the Democratic Party. He served as president of LULAC from 1952 to 1953, and continued to serve the organization throughout the 1970s and 1980s. He introduced President John F. Kennedy at a speaking engagement before a LULAC assembly on November 21, 1963, the day before his assassination.

== Personal life ==
Herrera died in Houston in 1986. His papers are archived at the Houston Public Library.

== Trivia ==
- John J. Herrera Elementary School in Houston, Texas (of Houston ISD) is named after Herrera.
